= Sports teams named Redskins =

Part of the larger Native American mascot controversy

Sports teams named Redskins are part of the larger controversy regarding the use of Native American names, images and symbols by non-native sports teams. Teams of this name have received particular public attention because the term redskin is now generally regarded as disparaging and offensive.

The most prominent team of this name was the Washington Redskins of the National Football League (NFL), which had been at the center of several campaigns to change the name. After decades of defending the name, amid the removal of many names and images associated with systemic racism as part of the George Floyd protests, Washington yielded to pressure from investors and sponsors and retired the branding in 2020. The team temporarily played as the Washington Football Team before rebranding as the Commanders in 2022.

The college sports teams using the name changed voluntarily prior to the NCAA Native American mascot decision in 2005; the University of Utah became Utah Utes in 1972, Miami University of Ohio became the RedHawks in 1997 and the Southern Nazarene University became the Crimson Storm in 1998.

The South Eastern Manitoba Hockey League team that was formerly the Morden Redskins was renamed Morden Bombers in 2020.

Several high schools have followed the example of the Washington NFL team and agreed to change their names. Other high school and youth teams continue to use the name, though the number has been steadily declining. Defenders of the Redskins name, both nationally and locally, cite their tradition, and the pride they feel in their team, while calls for change are often dismissed as political correctness. The National Congress of American Indians (NCAI) database tracks 89 K-12 schools in 40 school districts with the Redskins mascot.

== Meaning of redskin ==
Redskin is one of the color terms for race that emerged in the colonial period as Native Americans encountered people who called themselves "white" and their slaves "black". The use of "red" as an identifier by Native Americans for themselves emerged in the context of Indian-European diplomacy in the southeastern region of North America, before later being adopted by Europeans. The choice of red rather than other colors may have been due to cultural associations rather than skin color; the red/white dichotomy having symbolic meaning for Native Americans in the southeast. Usage in the northeast region by Europeans may have been largely limited to descriptions of tribes such as the Beothuk of Newfoundland, whose practice of painting their bodies and possessions with red ochre led Europeans to refer to them as "Red Indians". The origin of the term "redskin" is debated. It may have first been used by Native Americans to refer to themselves, or by colonial settlers in the context of violence against Native Americans, in particular the paying of bounties for Indian scalps. The oldest known use dates to 1769, in a translation from the French peau rouge. This and other early quotations are from Native American speakers. By 1862, the term was being used disparagingly.

== Mascot controversy ==
In the early 20th century, sports teams began adopting Native American-themed names, including "Redskins". Miami University in Ohio and Huntley High School in Huntley, Illinois started using the "Redskins" name in 1928. In 1933, the Boston Braves of the National Football League changed their name to the Boston Redskins; the team states that this was done in honor of Native Americans on the team, although owner George Preston Marshall said at the time it was done to avoid confusion with the Boston Braves baseball team. This team became the Washington Redskins by relocating to Washington, D.C. in 1937.

Native American mascots are often discussed in the media in terms of offensiveness, which reduces it to feelings and opinions, and prevents full understanding of the history and context of the use of Native American names and images and why their use by sports teams should be eliminated. Social science research says that sports mascots and images, rather than being mere entertainment, are important symbols with deeper psychological and social effects. Stereotyping may directly affect the academic performance and self-esteem of Native American youth, whose people face high rates of suicide, unemployment, and poverty. Euro-Americans exposed to mascots may be more likely to believe not only that such stereotypes are true, but that Native Americans have no identity beyond these stereotypes. Research demonstrates the harm of stereotyping, with studies showing that exposure to any stereotypes increased the likelihood of stereotypical thinking with regard to other groups.

In 2005, the American Psychological Association issued a resolution "Recommending the Immediate Retirement of American Indian Mascots, Symbols, Images, and Personalities by Schools, Colleges, Universities, Athletic Teams, and Organizations" due to the harm done by creating a hostile environment, the negative impact on the self-esteem of American Indian children, and discrimination that may violate civil rights. It also impacts non-natives by reinforcing mainstream stereotypes, preventing learning about Native American culture. The APA states that stereotyping is disrespectful of the beliefs, traditions and values of Native Americans. Similar resolutions have been adopted by the North American Society for the Sociology of Sport, the American Sociological Association, the American Counseling Association, and the American Anthropological Association. In a 2005 report on the status of Native American students, the National Education Association included the elimination of Indian mascots and sports team names as one of its recommendations.

=== Washington Redskins ===
Native American individuals, tribes and organizations have been questioning the use of the name and image for decades. In the 1940s the National Congress of American Indians (NCAI) created a campaign to eliminate negative stereotyping of Native American people in the media. Over time, the campaign began to focus on Indian names and mascots in sports. The NCAI maintains that teams with Indian mascots defame Native American people, perpetuate negative stereotypes and demeaning their native traditions and rituals. The NCAI issued a new report in 2013 summarizing opposition to Indian mascots and team names generally, and the Washington Redskins in particular.

In response to the controversy, the team owner Dan Snyder sent an open letter to fans that was published in The Washington Post in October 2013. In the letter Snyder states that the most important meaning of the name Redskins is the association that fans have to memories of their personal history with the team. Snyder also states that the name was chosen in 1933 to honor Native Americans in general and the coach and four players at that time who were Native American; and that in 1971 the then coach George Allen consulted with the Red Cloud Athletic Fund on the Pine Ridge reservation when designing the logo.

In July 2020, amidst the removal of many names and images as part of the George Floyd protests, a group of investors worth $620 billion wrote letters to major sponsors Nike, PepsiCo, and FedEx encouraging pressure on the Redskins to change their name. Due to the pressure, the team announced they would be retiring the Redskins name and logo. They temporarily played as the Washington Football Team for two seasons before rebranding as the Commanders in 2022.

=== High schools ===
The number of high schools using the Redskins name has been in steady decline, 40% having had local efforts to change the name. Between 1988 and April 2013, 28 high schools in 18 states had done so. By December 2017, the number of high school "Redskins" had continued to decline from 62 to 49, including four affected by a 2015 California law. In July 2019 the number became 48 with retirement of the nickname at Teton High School. Paw Paw High School, in Paw Paw, Michigan, voted to change the name in March 2020, and selected Red Wolves as their new name in July. In July 2020 the school board voted to accept Red Wolves as the new name.

Two schools, in immediate response to the Washington Redskins name change, also made that decision: Anderson High School in Ohio and Clinton Community Schools in Michigan. Union High School in Tulsa, Oklahoma and Wichita North High School followed.

On its official website in early 2013, the Washington Redskins posted articles referring to high school teams using the same name (and often the same logo). The athletic director of Coshocton High School in Coshocton, Ohio, is quoted as saying, "We are very proud of our athletic teams and very proud to be called Redskins!" The principal of McLoud High School in McLoud, Oklahoma, says that not only students, but the local Native American population, take pride in the name. The coach at Lamar High School in Houston, Texas, says, "Our school is 75 years old and there's a lot of pride in it," he explained. "I think it's a great mascot, as all of the traits of a Redskins warrior are something to be admired."

Advocates for the Washington team often refer to the three majority Native American schools, concluding that because some Native Americans use the name to refer to themselves, it is not insulting. However, the principal of one of these, Red Mesa High School in Teec Nos Pos, Arizona, said that use of the word outside American Indian communities should be avoided because it could perpetuate "the legacy of negativity that the term has created". Wellpinit High School on the Spokane Indian Reservation in Washington wants nothing to do with the national controversy, seeing Redskins as the traditional name they have used for their team. However, they do not accept their usage as a justification for anyone else using the name.

==== Recent changes ====
The Cooperstown Central School Board of Education in Cooperstown, New York, voted 6–1 on March 6, 2013, to remove the Redskins mascot from its interscholastic athletic, extracurricular and academic programs. The move was prompted by a vote by the student body, asking that the mascot be changed. The Oneida Indian Nation was so moved by the actions of the Cooperstown students, that a letter by Oneida Nation Representative Ray Halbritter was written to the students, commending their decision and offering to make a contribution to help offset the cost of changing mascots.

On June 24, 2013, school board members of Port Townsend High School in Port Townsend, Washington, voted to replace its "Redskins" nickname, logo, and mascot (used since 1926) due to its divisive nature. In April 2014 the students selected Red Hawks as their new team name. The next step will be to select new graphics to replace the old.

Ledgemont High School in Thompson Township, Geauga County, Ohio, which had used the name, closed in 2014.

Lamar High School in Houston, Texas, was one of the four schools required to change their mascots as a result of a vote by the Houston Independent School District to remove culturally insensitive names. Lamar became the Texans in April, 2014.

On December 8, 2014, the Oklahoma City School Board voted unanimously to remove Redskins as the nickname for Capitol Hill High School. The vote came in response to pleas from students and teachers who found the term offensive. The following day some students of the high school upset by the change protested the school board decision. On January 6, 2015, the school board held an information forum at which a panel of Native American community leaders presented the reasons for the decision, including the derogatory nature of the term. Some members of the audience walked out during the presentation, and one alumnus called the presentation "propaganda" and asserted his opposition to changing the name. Another alumnus stated that if any Native Americans did not like the name Redskins they should go to a native school. A committee selected four possible replacements (Red Hawks, Red Wolves, War Eagles and Nations), with the final decision to be made by a vote of Capitol Hill students. Names such as Chieftains and Warriors, although favored by alumni on the committee, were not selected as continuing the linkage to Native Americans. In a vote by students in May, 2015, Red Wolves was selected as the new mascot.

The name of the Lancaster, New York High School team was discussed at a school board meeting in January 2015. "Of all the words that could be used to describe us, 'Redskin' is the worst, said John Kane, talk show host for the First Voices Indigenous Radio Network". The school has de-emphasized the Redskins name in recent years, eliminating the name and logo from the scoreboard and uniforms. However, two former school board members defend the name, citing it as "a source of community identity, pride and spirit". Kane characterized the defense of the name as having an "Archie Bunker" mentality. "In this day and age, it's not a celebratory term," said Hilary N. Weaver, associate dean for academic affairs at the University at Buffalo and co-director of the Immigrant and Refugee Research Institute. "You're a school district, and it's important to look at what you're teaching. … I don't think racism has a place in an educational institution." The name was again debated at the Lancaster school on March 3, 2015, and was defended by many, but not all current and former students. The President of the Seneca Nation of New York, Maurice John Sr., wrote a letter stating: "Let's be clear — the term "redskin" is a racial slur ... I strongly disagree with those who argue that it is a term of honor and respect. It has no place in today's society." The letter was also addressed to President Barack Obama, Governor Andrew Cuomo and NFL Commissioner Roger Goodell with reference to the Washington NFL team. Two high schools, in Akron and Lake Shore, have cancelled Lacrosse games with Lancaster in support of the Native American opposition to the Redskins name. The student population in the Lake Shore school district is 15% Native American, and 11% in Akron, while there are only a dozen Native Americans out of 6,000 students at Lancaster. On March 16, the Lancaster school board voted unanimously to retire the Redskin mascot. Two days after the decision, about 300 students in favor of keeping the mascot protested, out of 2,000 total in the school district. The Lancaster School Board has been given a service award by the Western New York Educational Service Council for the courage and wisdom it displayed in determining that the current mascot was harmful to the Native American population. In June, 2015 a student vote selected Legends as the new name with a knight in armor as the new logo.

Fort Wayne Community Schools officials began discussions in July 2015 to change the Redskins name used by North Side High School for its athletic teams, marching band and school nickname. The nickname was changed to Legends in December, 2015.

In Goshen, Indiana, the majority of the school board was in favor of changing the mascot of Goshen High School while others, including athletic staff, favor maintaining what they view as part of a tradition of leadership and sportsmanship. The board decided in a 5–2 vote to retire the name, proponents citing the reevaluation spurred by the Washington NFL controversy. The Pokagon Band of Potawatomi Indians is among those advocating the change, saying in a written statement, "The R-word crosses a line for us. It's offensive, derogatory, and demeaning. ... Using the R-word perpetuates harmful stereotypes of Native Americans, and continues the damaging practice of relegating Native Americans to the past and portraying us as a caricature." The Goshen school board voted November 16, 2015 to adopt RedHawks as the new mascot, effective January 1, 2016.

The Conrad Schools of Science in Wilmington, Delaware, formed a "Retire the Mascot" committee to begin the process of changing the mascot that has been used for 80 years, but which many students and staff now agree is offensive to Native Americans. However, the president of the alumni association states that "He and other Conrad alumni wear their Redskins pins and clothing with pride." In May, 2016, the committee voted 9 to 4 to recommend that the Red Clay Consolidated School District that the name be changed. The chiefs of two local tribes, the Nanticoke and the Lenape are in favor of the change, but many alumni appeared at the meeting to oppose it. In June, 2016, the Red Clay board voted 4-2 to drop the name, and begin the process of selecting another. The "Red Wolves" was selected by a student vote in February, 2017.

Citing the trend towards elimination of the Redskins mascot by other schools, Belding High School in Michigan began tending towards the use of an Old English "B" logo in September 2016. The Belding Area Schools Board of Education unanimously voted December 19, 2016, to drop the Redskins and begin the process of selecting a new name. With the start of the school year in 2019, Belding completed its rebranding as the Black Knights, made financially possible by a grant from the Native American Heritage Fund.

In June 2013 the school superintendent in Driggs, Idaho, announced that Teton High School would drop its longtime "Redskins" nickname, logo and mascot to show respect for Native Americans. However, the decision was not immediately implemented due to the costs, and the school board had not taken any further action. A discussion of the mascot was placed on the agenda for the July, 2019 school board meeting at the request of a local resident. The school board for the Teton School District voted 4-1 to retire the nickname at Teton High School in Driggs, Idaho with the stipulation no taxpayer money goes toward the removal process; after two of Idaho’s largest Native American tribes, the Shoshone-Bannock and the Nez Perce urged the change, citing the word’s offensive definition by major dictionaries and its use as a racial slur. Teton High School announced their new mascot as the Timberwolves on June 16, 2020.

The team name of Anderson High School in a suburb of Cincinnati, Ohio, has been a topic of controversy since the nearby Miami University changed from the Redskins to the Redhawks in 1997. A May 2018 meeting of the Forest Hills Local School District's "Branding and Mascot" committee ended in a shouting match between opponents and advocates of change, the latter including the Greater Cincinnati Native American Coalition. In June 2018, after four months of passionate public input and very uncomfortable meetings, the committee decided that no consensus could be reached and made no recommendation to change the team name. The greater awareness of systemic racism in response to the murder of George Floyd resulted in a reconsideration of the issue, and on July 2, 2020 the school board voted to retire the mascot.

As part of a school merger in 2021, Emmerich Manual High School will become the Eagles.

Cuyahoga Heights High School, Cuyahoga Heights, Ohio dropped the name in August 2021. Until a news mascot is selected, the school will be known as "Heights". Imagery associated with the old name on uniforms and surfaces will be removed by normal replacement. The school board for Saranac High School, Saranac, Michigan voted to drop the name after a replacement is selected.

==== California law ====
Upon introducing a bill to ban, as of January 2017, the Redskins name used by high schools in the state of California, Assemblyman Luis Alejo stated that there is "no reason why we can't ... phase out that particular derogatory term from our public high schools". The four affected high schools are Tulare Union High School, Gustine High School, Calaveras High School, and Chowchilla Union High School. The governor signed the bill into law on October 11, 2015.

Gustine High became the first to implement a change in February, 2016; becoming the "Reds", the name used by the school from 1913 to 1936.

After a vote between four alternatives in 2016, Calaveras High School removed the Redskins name, but did not replace it. Calaveras began calling itself "the Mighty Reds" on its website in 2017 while retaining its prior Native American logo. For the 2022-23 school year Calaveras became the Red Hawks with a new logo.

The Tulare school board began the process by surveying the public. The local Tule River Indian tribe was also consulted. The committee selected "The Tribe" as its top choice in April, 2016. The school principal stated their intention to retain Native American imagery as much as possible. The Tulare Joint Union High School District board of trustees voted 3-2 for "Tribe" as the new mascot in June, 2016. Prior Native American imagery has been retained.

Chowchilla Union High School put off its decision until November 2016, after the celebration of the 100th anniversary of the school in October. The Chowchilla team name will be "Tribe", retaining their logo and Native American imagery.

As of the January 2017 deadline, three of the four schools have complied with the letter of the law but not the spirit, retaining their Native American imagery and behavior, including a female student portraying an Indian princess in a floor-length war bonnet and fans whopping and tomahawk chopping at games. With the agreement of the local government, Chowchilla has added "Redskins Way" signs to the streets leading to the school and insist they are maintaining a proud tradition that honors Native Americans, even as tribal members state that these practices trivialize and misrepresent the factual history of Native Americans in California.

==== Opposition to change ====
===== Neshaminy High School, Pennsylvania =====
In 2013, after failing in her appeals directly to Neshaminy High School, a parent, Donna Fann-Boyle (Cherokee-Choctaw) filed a complaint with the Pennsylvania Human Relations Commission (PHRC) alleging the "Redskins" name is a form of harassment offensive to Native Americans and her then 13-year-old son who attended the school. The school board unanimously voted to ask the commission to dismiss the complaint.

In 2015 the PHRC made a preliminary finding that the name Redskins is "racially derogatory" and creates a "hostile educational environment." On November 25, 2019, the PHRC issued a final order "that the school cease and desist from the use of any and all logos and imagery in the Neshaminy High School that negatively stereotype Native Americans; and that, at this time, the use of the term Redskins shall be permitted so long as the requisite educational information is provided to District students to ensure that students do not form the idea that it is acceptable to stereotype any group; the District shall also develop an appropriate educational experience consistent with the points outlined in the opinion; within 30 days of the effective date of this order the, that the District shall report to the PHRC on the manner of its compliance with the terms of the order; additionally as long as the District continues to use the name Redskins the district shall report on the actions it has taken to comply with the educational requirements of this order." The board of the Neshaminy School District voted unanimously in 2019 to appeal the entire PHRC decision, their attorney saying that the claims of racism are untrue and that Neshaminy is being singled out for unfair treatment compared to the other Pennsylvania schools that also use Native American names or imagery. In the six years of litigation (2013-2019), the school district spent about $435,000 to defend the team name and images. In 2021 the Commonwealth Court of Pennsylvania reversed the PHRC's final order on the basis of failure to establish discrimination against Native Americans.

====== School newspaper ======
After hearing Fann-Boyle's and other Native Americans, editors of the student newspaper, the Playwickian, voted 14–7 to stop using the name. An editorial by the majority stated "The word 'Redskin' is racist, and very much so. It is not a term of honor, but a term of hate" and quoted Chief Bob Red Hawk member of the Lenape Nation as saying "Our children look at us when they hear this term with questions on why people would use this hateful word". An editorial by the minority cited the schools traditions, their intent to honor Native Americans, and public opinion polls in support of keeping and printing the name.

The principal and the school board president decided that the student newspaper's editorial board did not have the right to refuse to use the name. The school board reached a compromise policy in which the name would not be entirely banned, but allowed in editorials and letters to the editor; however the editors of the paper and their attorney maintain that this policy is contrary to state law and the US Constitution.

The Playwickian refusal to print the name came to a head when a student in favor of remaining Redskins submitted an editorial, which the paper printed with the name redacted. The principal eventually suspended the paper's faculty adviser, Tara Huber, for two days, and suspended editor-in-chief from her duties. The paper's funding was also cut by the approximate cost of the redacted issue. The faculty adviser, Tara Huber was named Journalism Teacher of the Year in 2014 by the Pennsylvania School Press Association. The Playwickian journalists were honored by the ACLU on October 8, 2014, receiving one of four Civil Libertarian Awards, and in December, 2014 by the Philadelphia City Council with a resolution commending their actions. The editors of the school newspaper continue to oppose the use of the name, but have been reprimanded for doing so by the school administration.

The law firm representing the Student Press Law Center has sent a letter to the solicitor of the Neshaminy School District citing the federal and state laws and school policy that have been violated by the school administration in failing to respect the independence decision of the Playwickian editorial board to redact the Redskins name in all articles submitted.

==== Other schools with controversies ====
The school board voted unanimously in February 2021 to retain the mascot at Algood Middle School in Putnam County, Tennessee, citing more community support than opposition.

Union High School in Tulsa, Oklahoma, a high-profile high school athletic program, consistently opposed protests and proposed legislation intended to change its "Redskins" nickname. In July 2020, the Union school board announced it would reevaluate the district’s mascot.; in November 2020 the name was retired.

The school board of McLoud Public Schools in McLoud, Oklahoma, met in December 2015 and, after hearing testimony on both sides, voted to keep Redskins as the name of its high school's athletic teams.

The Canisteo-Greenwood School Board in New York voted in 2013 to remove the mascot but reversed the decision due to public opposition. In December 2022 a committee that included students, staff and alumni recommended changing the mascot after two months of study that included a survey in which 80% supported the change.

The mascot of Paw Paw Public Schools in Paw Paw, Michigan, had been the subject of discussion for more than 20 years. While votes to retain the name have been passed, protests continue making the issue recur. Change was narrowly defeated in a school board vote in 2017. In protest, a Native American rights group erected a billboard in 2018 near I-94 in Paw Paw pointing to the dictionary definition of the term as disparaging and offensive. The school board decided to end the continuing controversy in March 2020 by retiring the name at the end of the school year. On July 13, 2020, Paw Paw Public Schools adopted the "Red Wolves" team name.

Although two former students who are Native American began a protest to change the mascot of Clinton Community Schools in Michigan, community support at a special meeting to discuss the issue resulted in a decision to keep the name.

The mascot of Hurricane High School in West Virginia, is the Redskins. David Cremeans, principal chief of the Native American Indian Foundation of West Virginia, views the name Redskins as having a hurtful history. Chief Cremeans does not seek to change the name of the mascot, and instead he considers it way to help non-natives to learn about Native American culture.

While aware of the controversy over the Washington team, there is no local discussion regarding Loudon High School in Tennessee changing its name.

===== Remaining high schools =====
- Algood Middle School, Algood, Tennessee
- Arcadia High School, Arcadia, Ohio
- Bryan County High School, Pembroke, Georgia
- Caldwell High School, Caldwell, Ohio
- Coshocton High School, Coshocton, Ohio
- Donna High School, Donna, Texas
- Fort Loramie High School, Fort Loramie, Ohio - At a school board meeting in July 2020 only one resident spoke in favor of changing the name, while 14 favored keeping it.
- Hurricane High School, Hurricane, West Virginia
- Indian Creek High School, Wintersville, Ohio
- Kingston High School, Kingston, Oklahoma - The town population is about 15% Native American
- Knox Community High School, Knox, Indiana
- Liberal High School, Liberal, Kansas
- Little River High School, Little River, Kansas
- Loudon High School, Loudon, Tennessee
- Manteo High School, Manteo, North Carolina
- McLoud High School, McLoud, Oklahoma
- Momence High School, Momence, Illinois
- Neshaminy High School, Langhorne, Pennsylvania
- Nokomis High School, Nokomis, Illinois
- Oneonta High School, Oneonta, Alabama
- Pocahontas High School, Pocahontas, Arkansas
- Port Clinton High School, Port Clinton, Ohio
- Red Mesa High School, Teec Nos Pos, Arizona (Majority of students Native American)
- Ringgold High School, Ringgold, Louisiana
- Rush Springs High School, Rush Springs, Oklahoma
- St. Henry High School, St. Henry, Ohio
- St. Johns High School, St. Johns, Arizona
- Sayre High School, Sayre, Pennsylvania
- Shawnee High School, Wolf Lake, Illinois
- Social Circle High School, Social Circle, Georgia - Having received comments both pro and con on changing the mascot, the superintendent stated that there will be no change in 2020 due to the cost.
- Sullivan High School, Sullivan, Illinois
- Utica High School, Utica, Ohio
- Wapakoneta High School, Wapakoneta, Ohio
- Wellpinit High School, Wellpinit, Washington - The majority of students are members of the Spokane Tribe, and voted to retain the name in 2014 and again in 2023.

=== Other teams ===
Throughout the country, some of the other teams with the Redskins name must deal with the controversy. Others say there have been no complaints, including a youth league in Sarasota, Florida, the "Ringling Redskins" in which the teams are the "Braves", "Indians", and "Warriors".

==== Baseball ====
- Midland Skins (formerly known as the Redskins), Batavia, Ohio

==== Basketball ====
- Sheboygan Red Skins (defunct since 1950)

==== American football ====
===== Pop Warner =====
- Oak Cliff Redskins, Dallas, Texas
- Far West Redskins, Phoenix, Arizona
- Reynolds Corner Redskins, Toledo, Ohio
- Willamette Redskins, Eugene, Oregon

===== Youth/Little league =====
- Antioch Redskins, Plant City, Florida
- Dearborn Heights Redskins Jr. Football, Dearborn Heights, Michigan
- Donaldsonville Redskins, Donaldsonville, Louisiana
- Fauquier Youth Football, Fauquier County, Virginia
- Grayling Redskins Youth Football, Grayling, MI
- Jackson Redskins Sports Club, Jackson, Mississippi
- Kanawha Youth Football Redskins, Richmond, Virginia
- Lancaster Junior Redskins, Lancaster, New York
- Loudon Redskins Youth Football, Loudon, Tennessee
- New Rock Redskins, Conyers, GA (Ages 6–12) Uses the DC team logo
- Ohio Redskins Youth Sports Association, Columbus, Ohio
- Rochester Redskins, Rochester, Michigan
- Patterson Redskins Football (youth) Patterson, CA
- Sarasota Redskins, Sarasota, Florida
- South Cherokee Redskins Association, Woodstock, Georgia
- Southwest Redskins, Houston, Texas
- Sterling Heights Redskins, Sterling Heights, Michigan (youth) Uses the DC team logo
- Stonybrook Redskins, Indianapolis, Indiana
- Washington Redskins Midget Football, Washington, New Jersey
- Wayland Redskins, Wayland, NY (Youth Football ages 6–12)
- Whittier Redskins, Whittier, California
- Woonsocket Redskins, Woonsocket, Rhode Island – Youth Football (K-9th grade) Uses the DC team logo

==== Wrestling ====
- Morris, Illinois – Little Redskins IKWF sanctioned wrestling club (K-8th grade) Uses a version of the DC team logo

==== Teams outside the Americas ====
Native American names and images are used by teams in other countries, generally those playing American-style sports and copying the imagery of American teams. Several are in Austria and Germany, which have a tradition of Native American hobbyists. The controversy is also international, with the ice hockey team in Streatham, England dropping its Redskins nickname in 2016 to become the Streatham Redhawks.

- Bürstadt Redskins, an American Football club in Bürstadt, Germany
- Dornbirn Indians, Redskins, and "Little Indians", a youth baseball club in Austria.
- Raynes Park Little League, Kensington, England - Redskins
- Redskins Imola, a Baseball club in Imola, Italy

== See also ==
- Redskin
- Native American mascot laws and regulations
