= Oklahoma State Highway 102 =

State highway in Oklahoma, United States

State Highway 102
- SH 102 highlighted in red

Route information
- Maintained by ODOT
- Length: 52.9 mi (85.1 km)
- Existed: May 2, 1955–present

Major junctions
- South end: SH-39 in Wanette
- SH-9 near Pink; I-40 near McLoud; US 62 in Midway
- North end: SH-66 west of Wellston

Location
- Country: United States
- State: Oklahoma

Highway system
- Oklahoma State Highway System; Interstate; US; State; Turnpikes
| ← SH-101 | → SH-104 |

State Highway 102 (abbreviated SH-102 or OK-102) is a north–south state highway in central Oklahoma. It runs for 52.9 miles (85.1 km) from Wanette, Oklahoma to Wellston, Oklahoma. It has no lettered spur routes.

SH-102 traces its origins to a spur route from SH-39 to Wanette that was added to the highway system in 1955. This highway was gradually extended bit by bit before reaching its present extent in 1977.

== Route description ==
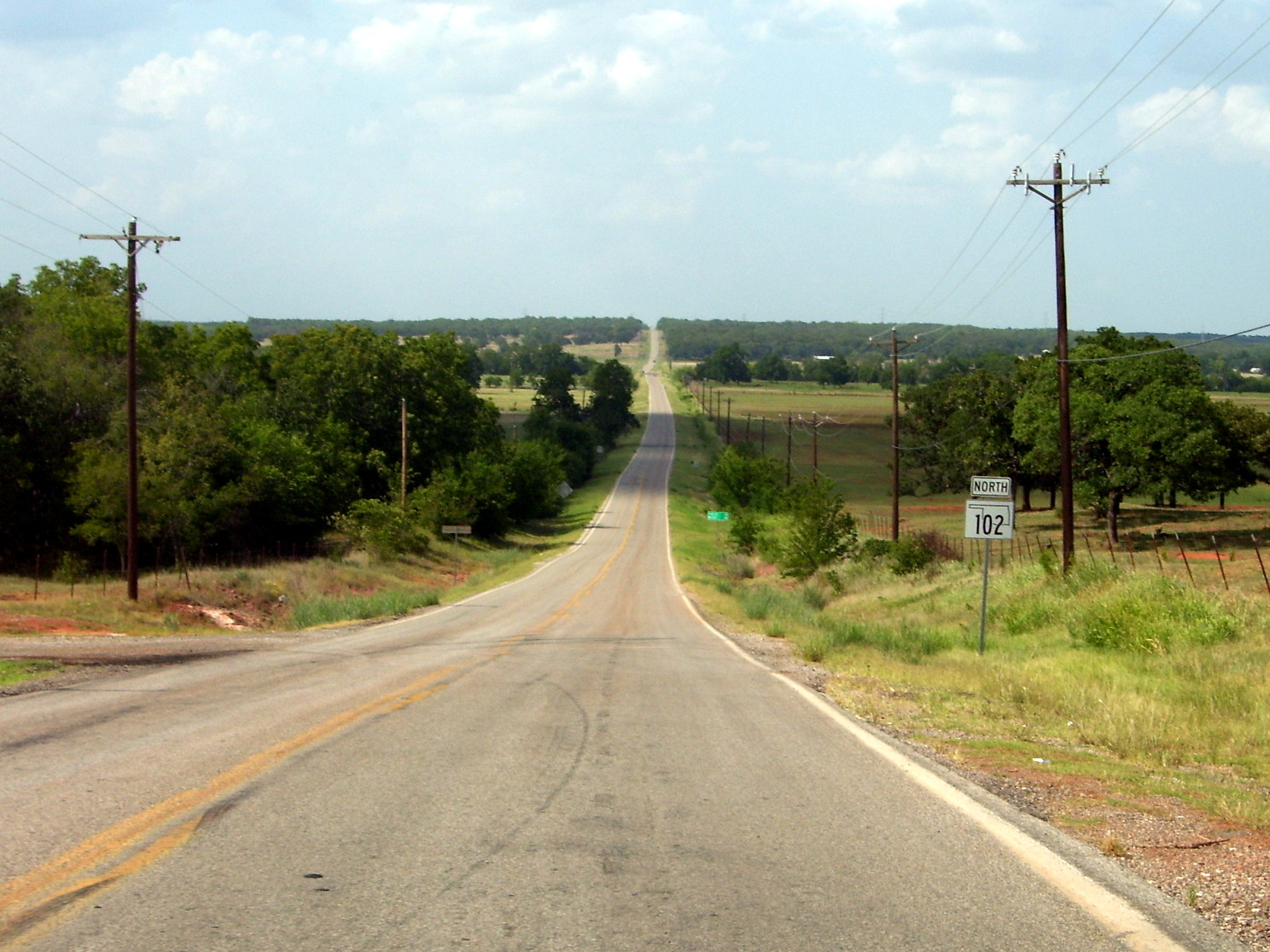
SH-102 just north of SH-59B.

SH-102 begins in downtown Wanette and heads northward to meet State Highway 39, which it very briefly overlaps. After splitting off, it heads due north to Tribbey. Two miles north of Tribbey, it meets the western terminus of SH-59B, west of Macomb. Eight miles later, it crosses State Highway 9 east of Pink. It provides access to the Shawnee Reservoir before meeting Interstate 40.

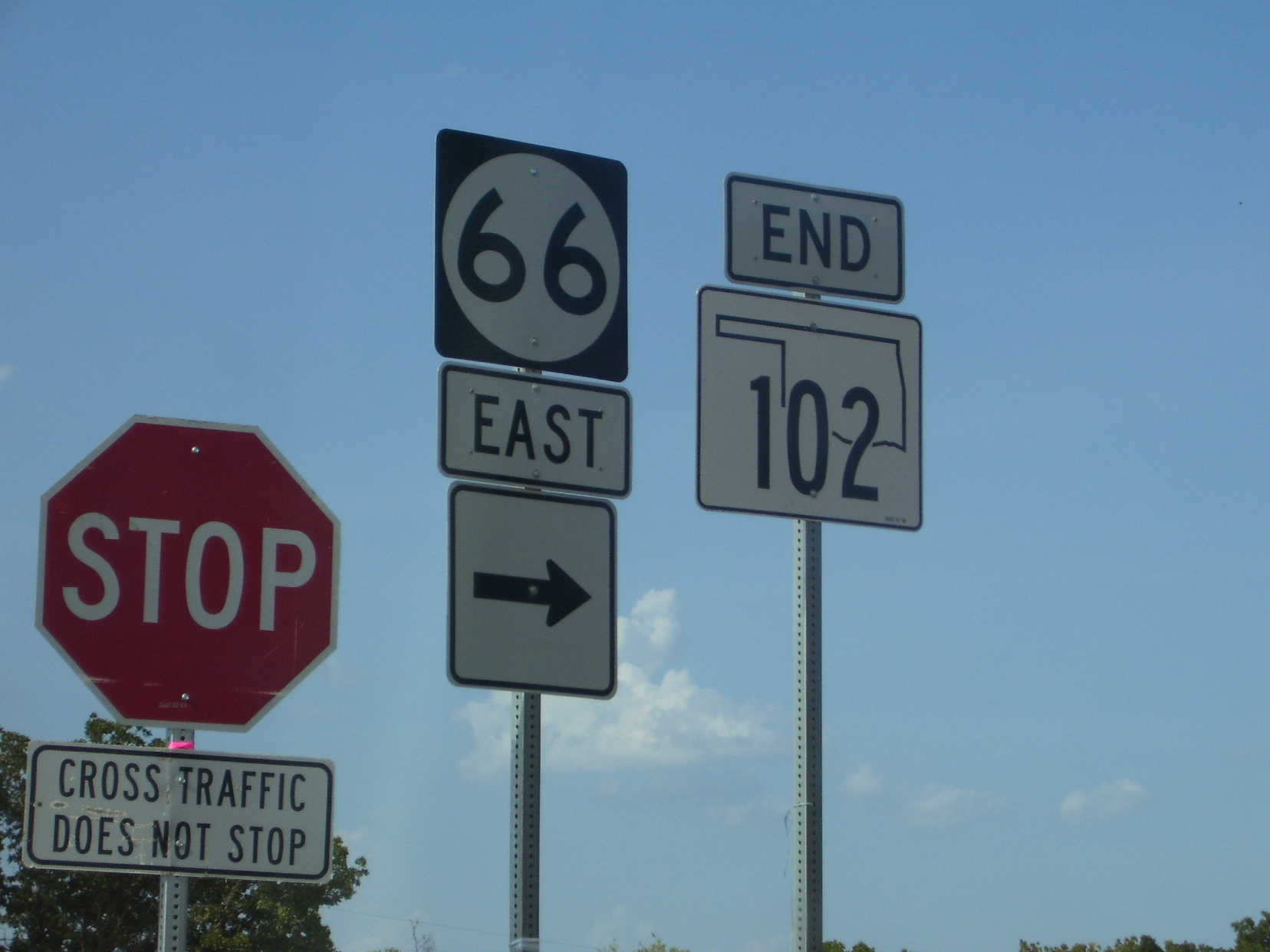
SH-102's northern end near Wellston

SH-102 merges into Interstate 40 at Exit 178 (Dale/Bethel Acres) and splits at Exit 176 (McLoud Rd.). Between these two exits, SH-102 overlaps Interstate 40, US-270, and State Highway 3. After splitting off, it heads northward to meet State Highway 270 in McLoud, which it briefly overlaps. After splitting off in downtown McLoud, it heads northward to cross into Lincoln County. It crosses over Interstate 44 (the Turner Turnpike) with no interchange. The highway ends near Wellston at State Highway 66.

== History ==
State Highway 102 was first commissioned on May 2, 1955, as a spur route connecting Wanette to SH-39. A second segment of SH-102, extending from SH-9 west of Tecumseh to US-270 (present-day SH-270) between McLoud and Dale, was added on October 6, 1958. This situation—one short SH-102 spur to Wanette and a longer SH-102 from SH-9 to Dale—would persist for the next thirteen years.

The two sections of SH-102 were finally united during the 1970s. On May 10, 1971, the highway was extended south from SH-9 to SH-39 and joined to the Wanette spur by means of a concurrency. Two further changes to the highway occurred during 1977. The highway was extended north, first to US-62 at Midway, on June 6 of that year. Later, on August 1, the highway was extended further, bringing it to US-66 near Wellston.

SH-102 was briefly extended to SH-66B when work on what was by then SH-66 caused its traffic to be detoured onto SH-66B. After the work was completed, SH-102 was truncated back to SH-66, though the connector road still exists and remains open to traffic.

Prior to 2007, the bridge over I-44 was only one lane wide. This bridge was demolished and replaced, necessitating a detour along U.S. Highway 177, which parallels the route. I-44 was also reduced to two lanes during the rebuild. SH-102 now crosses the turnpike on a modern two-lane bridge.

== Junction list ==
| County | Location | mi | km | Destinations | Notes |
|---|---|---|---|---|---|
| Pottawatomie | | 1.9 | 3.1 | SH-39 | |
| Pottawatomie | | 2.1 | 3.4 | SH-39 | |
| Pottawatomie | | 13.7 | 22.0 | SH-59B | |
| Pottawatomie | Pink | 21.8 | 35.1 | SH-9 | |
| Pottawatomie | McLoud | 29.8 | 48.0 | I-40 | I-40 exit 178 |
| Pottawatomie | McLoud | 31.9 | 51.3 | I-40 | I-40 exit 176 |
| Pottawatomie | McLoud | 35.6 | 57.3 | SH-270 | |
| Pottawatomie | McLoud | 35.8 | 57.6 | SH-270 | |
| Lincoln | Midway | 39.7 | 63.9 | US-62 | |
| Lincoln | | 52.8 | 85.0 | SH-66 | Northern terminus |
1.000 mi = 1.609 km; 1.000 km = 0.621 mi: Concurrency terminus
