= Wah-Pah-Ho-Ko =

Kickapoo tribal leader (c. 1862-?)

- Born: c. 1862
- Occupation: Tribal leader
- Known for: Chief of the Kickapoo tribe

Wah-Pah-Ho-Ko (born c. 1862) was a Kickapoo tribal leader who served as the last hereditary chief of the Kickapoo tribe, leading her people during the late 19th and early 20th centuries as they faced internal divisions and U.S. government pressure to accept land allotments. She navigated legal battles and betrayals, including from government agents, while striving to maintain unity among the Kickapoo amidst efforts to relocate parts of the tribe to Mexico.

== Early life ==
Wah-Pah-Ho-Ko (also spelled Wah-Poho-Ko) was born c. 1862. She was a Kickapoo whose tribes moved between Mexico and the United States during the late 19th century. As a child, she was present during the 1873 raid on Remolino, Mexico, conducted by U.S. Army general Ranald S. Mackenzie, an event that disrupted the lives of many Kickapoo families.

== Career ==
Wah-Pah-Ho-Ko became the last hereditary chief of the Kickapoo tribe. During her leadership, she faced numerous challenges as the tribe navigated the pressures of land allotment policies and encroaching white settlers. At the time, the Kickapoos were divided into different factions: progressives, who were more open to adopting European-American ways, and conservatives, who adhered to traditional customs.

In 1891, the U.S. government began to pressure the tribe to cede their reservation and accept individual allotments. This process, which often involved the sale of "surplus" land, was fraught with controversy. Wah-Pah-Ho-Ko played a critical role in leading her people through this period of transition, marked by internal division and external pressures from both the U.S. government and unscrupulous businessmen.

One significant adversary during her tenure was Martin J. Bentley, a government agent who initially won the trust of the Kickapoos but later sought to manipulate land allotments for personal gain. Bentley’s actions, along with other businessmen known as the "Shawnee Wolves," exacerbated the tribe’s struggles, leading to further dislocation and hardship for many Kickapoos. In 1905, Bentley facilitated the movement of around 200 Kickapoos, known as the "Wah-Pah-Ho-Ko group," to Mexico, where their conditions worsened.

Wah-Pah-Ho-Ko's leadership was tested as the tribe faced repeated betrayals and legal battles over land. Although some Kickapoos prospered after staying on their allotted lands in the U.S., those who followed Bentley to Mexico found themselves destitute. In 1907, she testified to the U.S. senate on behalf of her tribe. The legal battles over Kickapoo land extended into the 1910s, with the U.S. government eventually intervening to return some of the land to the tribe in 1914.

== Personal life ==
At one point Wah-Pah-Ho-Ko lived near a mission school north of McLoud, Oklahoma. She also lived in Mexico. She was married to Mah-Tah-Wah. In 1937, mats Wah-Pah-Ho-Ko weaved were included in an art exhibition in Tulsa, Oklahoma.
