= McLoud High School =

Location
- 1100 West Seikel Boulevard; McLoud, (Pottawatomie County), Oklahoma 74851; United States; 35°25′33″N 97°05′58″W

Information
- Type: Co-educational, public, secondary
- School district: McLoud Public Schools
- Authority: OSDE
- Superintendent: Steve Stanley
- Principal: Bryan Jennings
- Teaching staff: 35.09 (FTE)
- Grades: 9-12
- Student to teacher ratio: 14.65
- Colors: Red, black, and white
- Sports: Football, baseball, softball, soccer, basketball, weightlifting, wrestling, powerlifting, cheer, dance, pom
- Nickname: Redskins
- Website: www.mcloudschools.us/o/mhs/

McLoud High School is a public secondary school located in Pottawatomie County, Oklahoma, United States, in the town of McLoud. It instructs grades 9–12. It is a part of the McLoud Public School District, which also includes McLoud Elementary School and McLoud Junior High.

McLoud High School currently has 621 students enrolled, giving it a student to teacher ratio of 36:1. Its athletic teams are known as the Redskins, and the school colors are red, black, and white.

== Notable alumni ==
- Wyatt Olds (graduated 2018), professional baseball player for the Boston Red Sox

== See also ==
- Native American mascot controversy
- Sports teams named Redskins
