= Jerry Blevins =

American baseball player (born 1983)

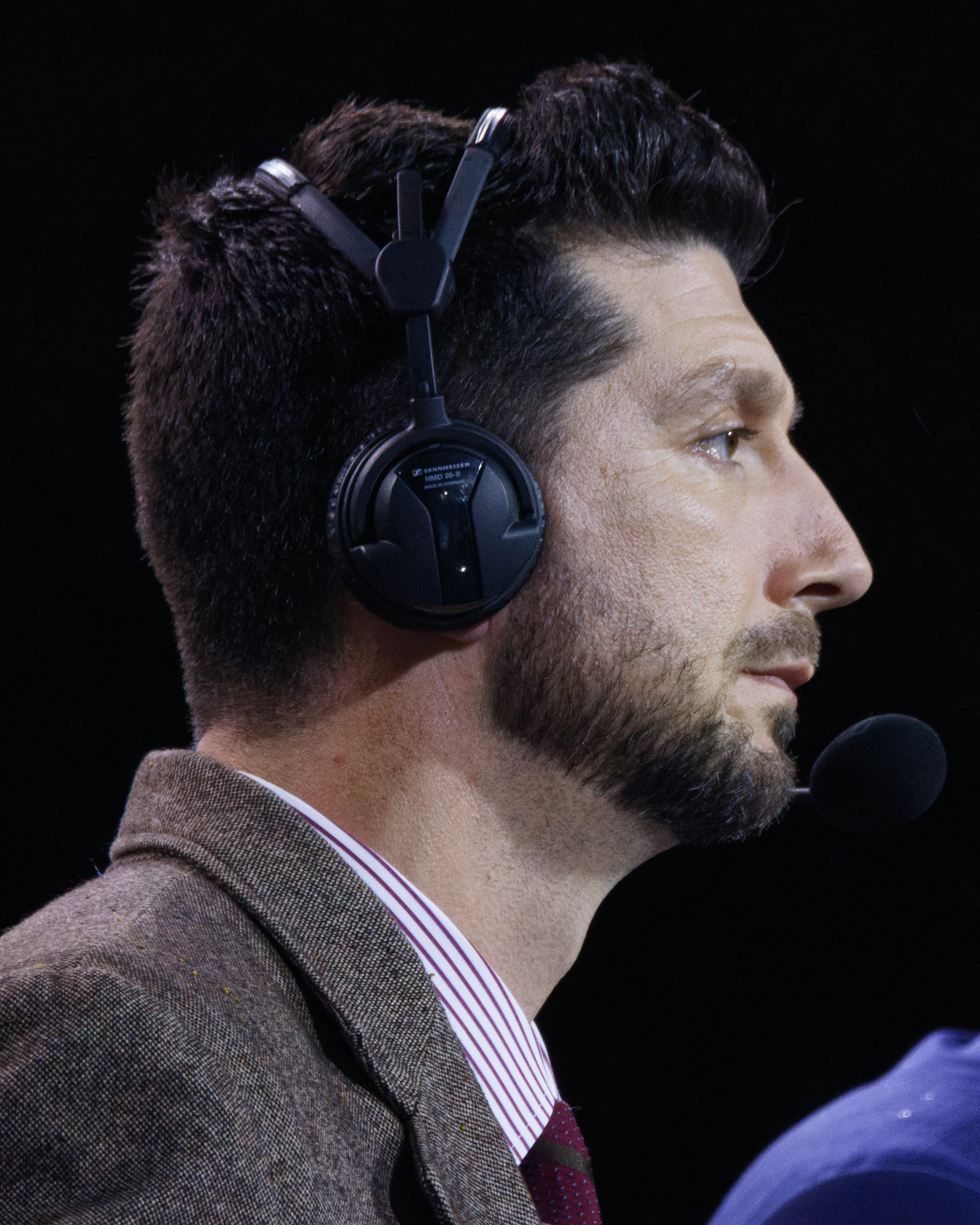
- Blevins during an SNY broadcast in 2022
- Pitcher
- Born: September 6, 1983 (age 43); Johnson City, Tennessee, U.S.
- Batted: Left Threw: Left

MLB debut
- September 16, 2007, for the Oakland Athletics

Last MLB appearance
- September 29, 2019, for the Atlanta Braves

MLB statistics
- Win–loss record: 30–13
- Earned run average: 3.54
- Strikeouts: 508
- Stats at Baseball Reference

Teams
- Oakland Athletics (2007–2013); Washington Nationals (2014); New York Mets (2015–2018); Atlanta Braves (2019)
Medals
Men's baseball
Representing United States
Baseball World Cup
| Gold medal – first place | 2007 Tianmu | Team |

Jerry Richard Blevins (born September 6, 1983), nicknamed Gordo (Spanish for "fat"), is an American former professional baseball pitcher. Blevins was drafted by the Chicago Cubs in the 17th round of the 2004 Major League Baseball draft, and made his major league debut in 2007. He played in Major League Baseball (MLB) for the Oakland Athletics, Washington Nationals, New York Mets, and Atlanta Braves. He currently serves as a studio analyst for the Mets' pregame and postgame shows on SNY, where he sometimes does color commentary for the network.

== Early life ==
Blevins was born in Tennessee, but moved to Ohio at four years old after his parents divorced. Although his biological father was not present in his life, he came to regard his stepfather, who came into his life when he was a freshman in high school, as a father. Blevins played baseball, basketball, and football and was in the marching band at Arcadia High School in Arcadia, Ohio. He became a fan of the Oakland Athletics during the 1990 World Series, and his favorite baseball players included Jose Canseco and Rickey Henderson, though he idolized Ken Griffey Jr.

Before graduating in 2001 with fewer than 50 other students, Blevins was only recruited to play college baseball by a local Division III school. Blevins chose instead to attend the University of Dayton on an academic scholarship. As a freshman, he attended an open tryout for the Dayton Flyers baseball team and earned a spot on the roster. He was teammates at Dayton with future Washington Nationals teammate Craig Stammen. Blevins struck out 70 batters in 73.2 innings as a junior at Dayton.

== Professional career ==
=== Chicago Cubs ===
Blevins was drafted by the Chicago Cubs in the 17th round (516th overall) of the 2004 Major League Baseball draft. He signed with the club on June 23 of that year, and began his pro career with the Single-A Boise Hawks, where he pitched 23 games, and was 6–1 with 5 saves and a 1.62 ERA, and 42 strikeouts in 33.1 innings. He was named a 2004 Northwest League mid-season All Star.

In 2005, he pitched for the Single-A Peoria Chiefs and was 3–7 with 14 saves and a 5.54 ERA and 96 strikeouts in 76.1 innings, but returned to Boise for the 2006 season. In 2006, he also pitched for the Single-A Daytona Cubs and the Double-A West Tenn Diamond Jaxx.

Blevins began the 2007 season with the Daytona Cubs. He pitched in 15 games there and had a 1–0 record with 6 saves and a 0.38 ERA before being promoted to the Double-A Tennessee Smokies on May 15. He pitched in 23 games for the Smokies, in which he had a 2–2 record with 3 saves and a 1.53 ERA, and 37 strikeouts in 29.1 innings. Blevins pitched a total of 38 games in the Cubs organization and had a 3–2 record with a 1.02 ERA.

=== Oakland Athletics ===
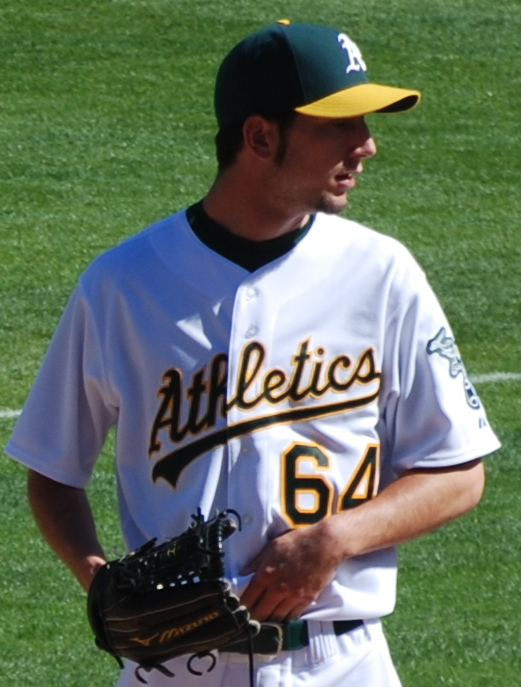
Blevins as a rookie in 2007

Blevins was traded to the Oakland Athletics, along with catcher Rob Bowen, for catcher Jason Kendall on July 16, 2007.

The Athletics, upon receiving Blevins, optioned him to Double-A Midland. He went 1–3 there with a 3.32 ERA in 17 games. He was promoted to the Sacramento River Cats, the Athletics Triple-A affiliate, on August 31, 2007. Before the River Cats season ended, he pitched in one game in which he did not give up a run and got the win in 2 2/3 scoreless innings pitched. Blevins helped the River Cats win the Pacific Coast League championship. After the win, Blevins was promoted to the Athletics major league club on September 15, 2007. Blevins pitched for four different minor league teams in 2007, and had a combined 5–5 record with a 1.63 ERA in 56 games. He also struck out 11.87 batters per nine innings and had a total of 102 strikeouts in 77 1/3 innings.

On September 16, 2007, Blevins made his major league debut, coming into the game in the ninth inning against the Texas Rangers. He pitched a perfect ninth inning and struck out David Murphy.

He was named a 2008 Pacific Coast League mid-season All Star.

Blevins was designated for assignment on May 23, 2011. He was later re-added back to the 40-man roster, only to be designated for assignment again on July 19. He was re-added to the 40-man roster a day later.

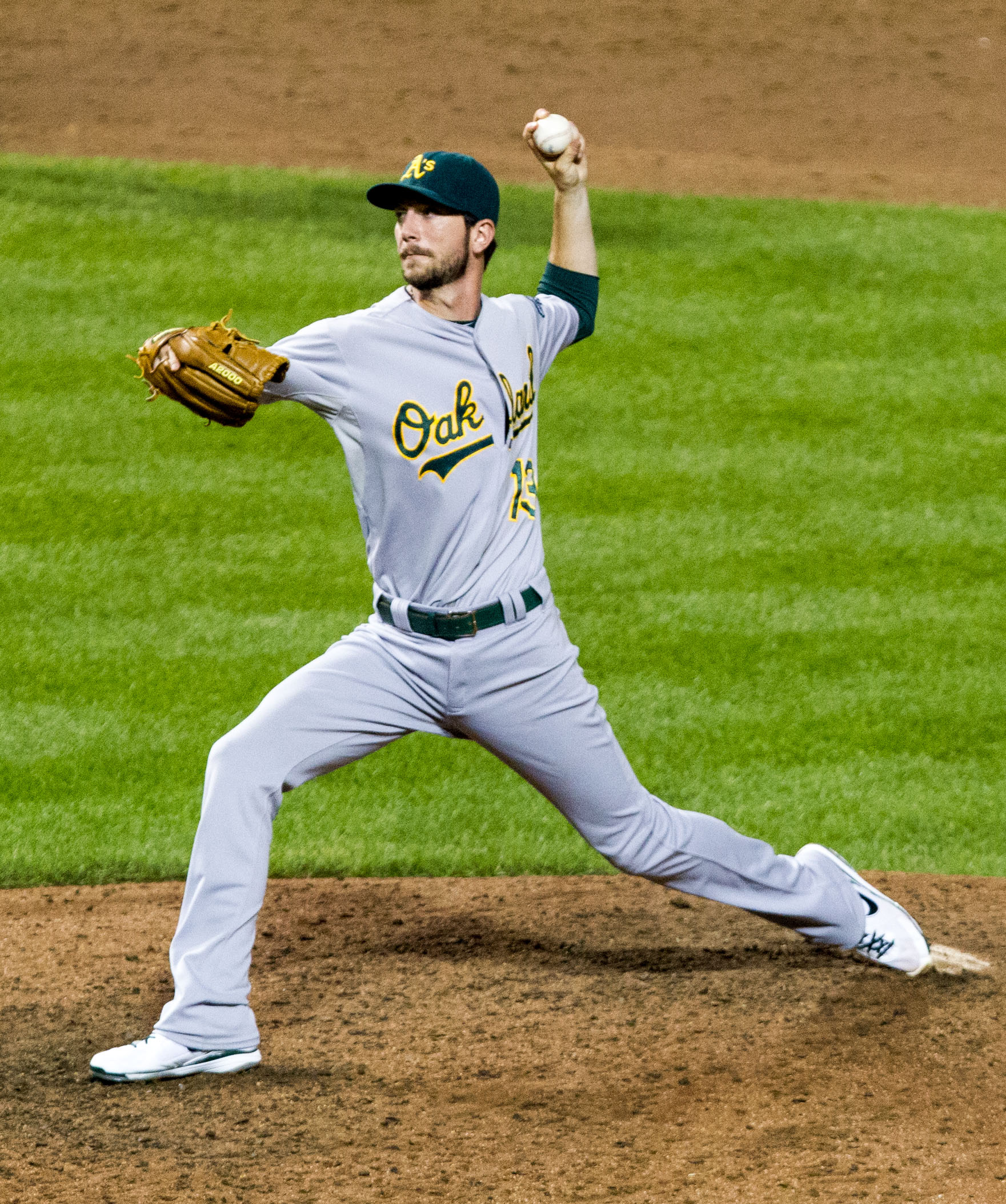
Blevins pitching for the Oakland Athletics in 2012

Blevins earned one save during the 2012 season, also his second save in his career, in a clutch relief appearance when A's closer Grant Balfour allowed two runs in the bottom of the ninth inning making the score 6–5 against the Los Angeles Angels. Blevins came in with the tying run at third and winning run at first, but he struck out Kendrys Morales and grounded Howard Kendrick into a double play to earn the save.

Blevins signed a one-year, $1.1 million deal with the Athletics to avoid arbitration before the 2013 season. On April 29, Blevins got the win in a 19-inning game against the Angels, pitching 1.2 scoreless innings. The Athletics won the game in the bottom of the 19th on a walk-off Brandon Moss home run. Blevins also batted in that game, striking out against Barry Enright in the 18th inning. In 67 appearances in 2013, Blevins went 5–0 with 4 holds and a 3.15 ERA, striking out 52 in 60 innings.

=== Washington Nationals ===
On December 11, 2013, Blevins was traded to the Washington Nationals for minor league outfielder Billy Burns. Blevins finished his 2014 season 2–3, with a 4.87 ERA, 66 strikeouts, and 23 walks, giving up 31 runs in 64 games in 57.1 innings pitched.

=== New York Mets ===
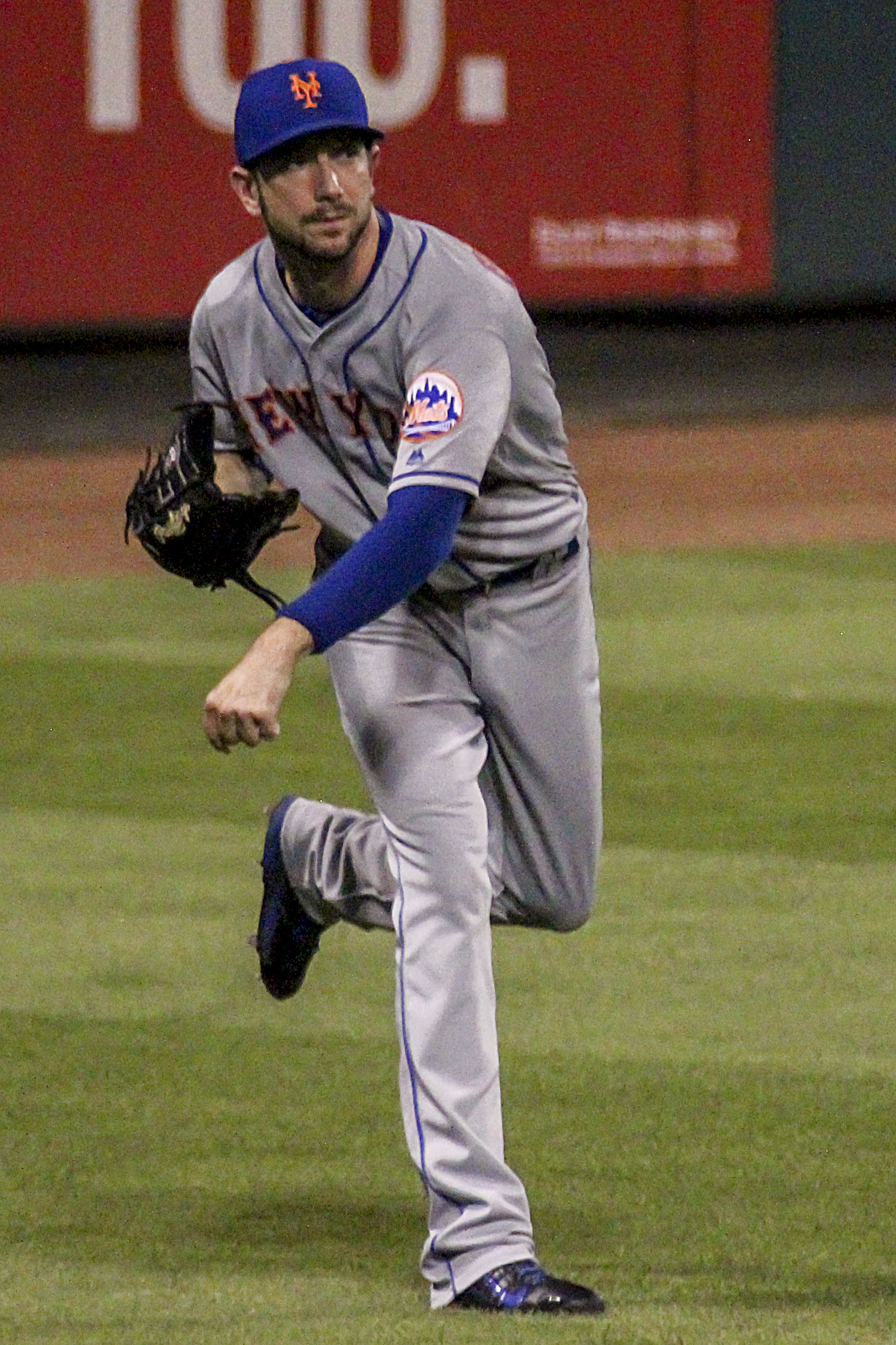
Blevins with the Mets in 2016

On March 30, 2015, Blevins was traded to the New York Mets for outfielder Matt den Dekker.

On April 19, 2015, Blevins was hit by a comebacker and suffered a distal radius fracture of the left arm and was placed on the 15-day disabled list. Blevins was recovering when he slipped on a curb and re-fractured his arm again, and missed the rest of the season. Blevins finished the 2015 season 1–0 with 4 strikeouts, no walks, no hits, and no hit batsmen in 5 innings pitched. As of 2022, no player has pitched more innings in a season without giving up a hit, walk, or HBP.

On December 15, 2015, Blevins signed a one-year, $4 million deal with incentives. In 2016 he was 4–2 with two saves and a 2.79 ERA and 52 strikeouts in 42 innings over 73 games.

On February 9, 2017, Blevins signed a one-year contract with the Mets that included a team option for the 2018 season.

In 2017 he was 6–0 with one save and a 2.94 ERA and 69 strikeouts over 49 innings in 75 games (3rd in the NL). In 2017 he threw a curveball 50.1% of the time, tops in MLB.

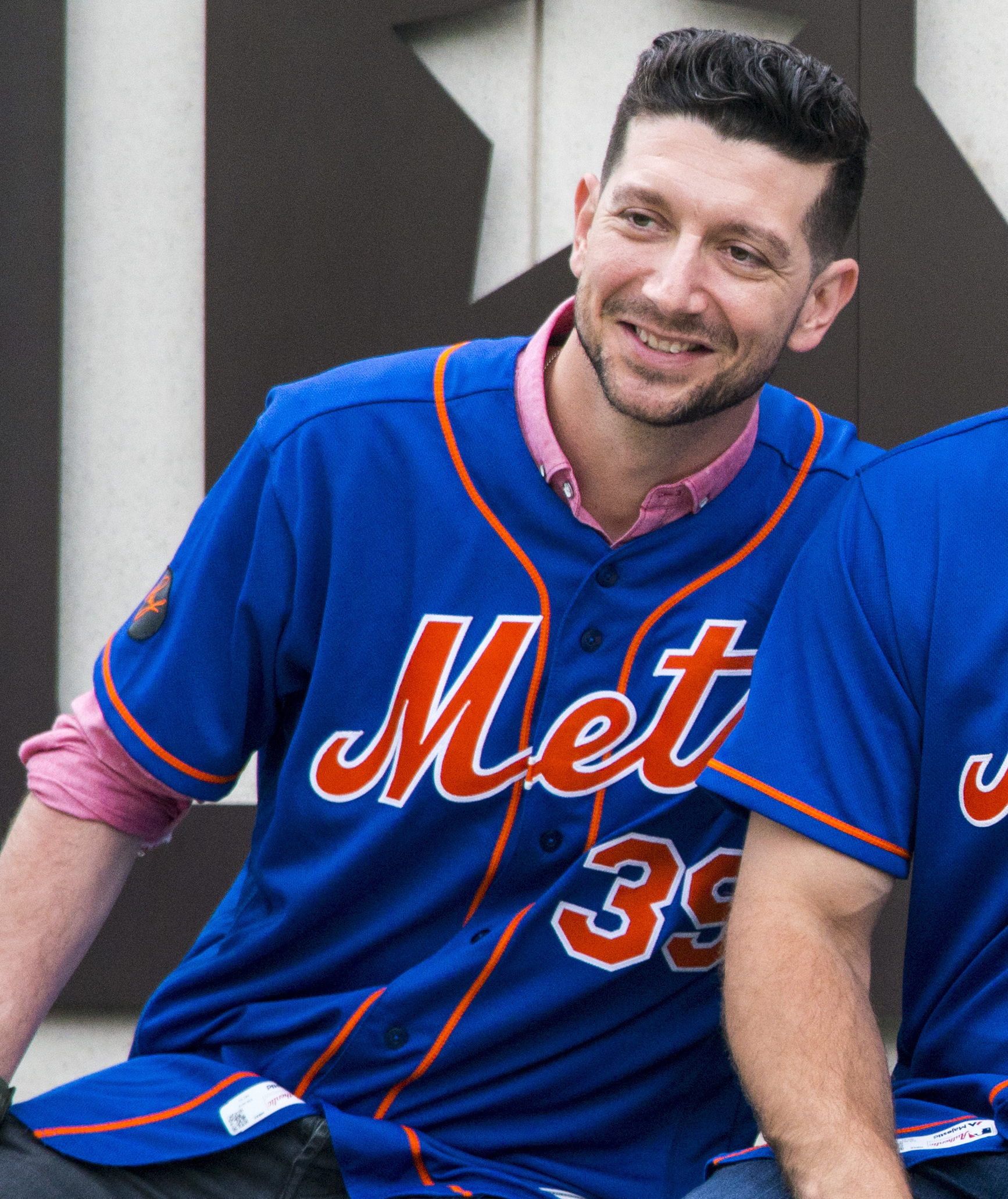
Blevins with the Mets in 2018

On June 24, 2018, at Citi Field, after a late injury to Jason Vargas, Blevins made his first Major League start. He allowed home runs to the first two batters he faced, Enrique Hernández and Max Muncy of the Los Angeles Dodgers. Blevins became only the second pitcher since 1900 to allow home runs to both of the first two hitters in his first career start. He was pulled after two innings.

On August 16 during the Mets' 24–4 rout of the Phillies, Blevins had his first MLB hit and RBI. It came off of position player Scott Kingery, who was pitching with the Phillies trailing by 17 runs.

In 2018 Blevins was 3–2, with a 4.85 ERA, in 42.2 innings over 64 games. He became a free agent following the season.

=== Oakland Athletics (second stint) ===
On February 4, 2019, it was reported that Blevins had signed a minor league contract with the Oakland Athletics worth $1.5 million in the major leagues. With the AAA Las Vegas Aviators he was 0–0 with a 1.69 ERA and 16 strikeouts in 10.2 innings over 7 games.

=== Atlanta Braves ===
On April 28, 2019, the Athletics traded Blevins to the Atlanta Braves in exchange for cash considerations. Blevins debuted for the Braves' on the same day, in a game against the Colorado Rockies. He was designated for assignment on May 14. He had his contract purchased for a second time on May 18. With the Braves in 2019, he was 1–0 with one save and a 3.90 ERA in 45 games covering 32.1 innings in which he had 37 strikeouts. He became a free agent following the 2019 season.

=== San Francisco Giants ===
On January 20, 2020, Blevins signed a minor league deal with the San Francisco Giants. He was released by the Giants prior to the season in April 2020.

=== New York Mets (second stint) ===
Following a 2020 season in which he did not play, Blevins told the Dayton Daily News he was leaning toward retirement; he assumed his playing career was over and was not actively pursuing a job or working out. Early in the offseason, the New York Mets extended an offer to Blevins, who began a throwing program and convinced himself that he could still compete. On December 21, 2020, Blevins signed a minor league contract with the Mets organization. After spring training, the Mets told Blevins that he would not be on their Major League roster to start the season. Blevins accepted assignment to the team's alternate site. On April 27, 2021, Blevins announced his retirement from professional baseball.

== Personal life ==
Blevins proposed to his wife, Whitney, on the National Mall. They have two sons.

Blevins is a supporter of same-sex marriage and when the Supreme Court decided Obergefell v. Hodges, Blevins tweeted "#LoveWins".
