= Pink, Oklahoma =

- Town
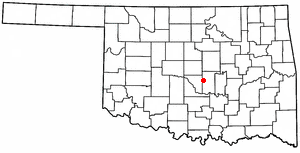
- Location of Pink, Oklahoma
- Coordinates: 35°13′58″N 97°06′00″W
- Country: United States
- State: Oklahoma
- County: Pottawatomie

Area
  - Total: 36.12 sq mi (93.54 km^{2})
  - Land: 36.12 sq mi (93.54 km^{2})
  - Water: 0 sq mi (0.00 km^{2})
- Elevation: 1,079 ft (329 m)

Population (2020)
  - Total: 2,091
  - Density: 57.9/sq mi (22.35/km^{2})
- Time zone: UTC-6 (Central (CST))
  - Summer (DST): UTC-5 (CDT)
- ZIP code: 74873
- Area codes: 405/572
- FIPS code: 40-59150
- GNIS feature ID: 2413137
- Website: www.townofpink.com

Pink is a town in Pottawatomie County, Oklahoma, United States, and is part of the Oklahoma City Metropolitan Area. The only town in the United States bearing this name, Pink lies within the boundaries of the Citizen Potawatomi Nation. The population was 2,091 at the time of the 2020 Census, which is 1.6% above the 2010 census figure of 2,058, which itself was a 76.7% increase from the figure of 1,165 in 2000.

The town name of Pink may have been chosen because it is complementary to Brown (now part of Pink), which was located a few miles east in the same township and range. This would be an example of the "twin name fad" in Pottawatomie County, like the towns of Romulus and Remus. Oral history suggests that the town name was in honor of a local resident named Pink.

The town was hit by a significant tornado on the night of April 19, 2023.

== History ==
=== Prehistory ===
From the information gathered during archaeological excavations along the Little River west and south of Pink, it appears that people lived in this area for many thousands of years including during the four-thousand year drought of the Altithermal which started around 8,500 years ago and turned most of Oklahoma into a vast desert. The Thunderbird Dam Site on Little River west of Pink appears to have been used from around 500 BC to 1000 AD. Hunters found the ridge above the river a good camping spot near water and plentiful game animals including deer and turkey.

=== 1800-1891 ===
The Oklahoma region became part of the United States with the Louisiana Purchase in 1803. The Indian Removal Act, signed into law by President Andrew Jackson in 1830, authorized the President to negotiate land exchange treaties with tribes located in lands of the United States. Relocation to Indian Territory began with the Five Civilized Tribes and soon expanded to other groups residing east of the Mississippi River.

==== Citizen Potawatomi ====
Originally driven west by the Iroqouis to the Lake Michigan area prior to 1640, the Potawatomi were driven out of their homes again during the Indian Removal. The Indiana Potawatomi were removed to Kansas and settled at St. Mary's Mission, becoming known as the Mission Potawatomi. Taking up United States citizenship, they became the Citizen Potawatomi Nation. In 1867, the Citizen Potawatomi sold their Kansas lands in order to purchase land in Indian Territory in what would become Pottawatomie County, including Pink.

The Potawatomi arrived in Indian Territory to find Shawnee occupying their land. The Shawnee had been living along the Canadian River in the Choctaw and Creek nations since about 1845, and being absent from their Kansas reservation, they became known as the Absentee Shawnee. In 1872, the United States Congress gave the Absentee Shawnee title to the lands they occupied in the Citizen Potawatomi Nation. Two decades later, the Dawes Act of 1887 forced the Citizen Potawatomi, Absentee Shawnee, Sac & Fox, and Iowa to accept individual allotments. After the allotments were completed, unoccupied land was opened to settlers in the Land Run of 1891, including land that would become the town of Pink.

==== Absentee Shawnee ====
One band of Absentee Shawnee led by Big Jim (Wapameepto), grandson of Tecumseh, opposed absorption into white society for fear of losing their cultural traditions. They had been living illegally north of the North Canadian River until November 1886 when soldiers from Fort Reno forced them to move south of the river to a place near Shawneetown. The soldiers burned their old houses and destroyed improvements they had made to the land so they could not return to their old homes. They wintered without shelter. Within three years they managed to build log houses and plant small fields and orchards amidst the White Turkeys, another band of Absentee Shawnees. By 1889, it was evident that the land they were now occupying would be broken up and sold.

Refusing to accept the notion of allotments, Big Jim's Band removed themselves to what they considered the most distant and worthless part of the Citizen Pottawatomie Nation. Big Jim thought that white men would not be interested in the sandy hills near the confluence of Hog Creek and Little River, and would consequently leave them alone. It was a futile attempt to escape allotments, and in 1890 Big Jim and his followers were forced by the Cherokee Commission to accept 80-acre allotments of mostly sandy hills and overflowed bottomland. The community, known as Big Jim Settlement (population 184 in 1901), later became Little Axe in eastern Cleveland County. The original center of the settlement was flooded upon completion of Lake Thunderbird in 1965, ironically turning Big Jim's "worthless" land into a desirable and popular state park.

The easternmost Big Jim Band allotments were in what is now the town of Pink. A number of these allotments are still intact, including 2,000 contiguous acres straddling the Pottawatomie/Cleveland county line on the north and south sides of Highway 9.

Several houses were built at the intersection of old Highway 37 and the Pottawatomie/Cleveland county line prior to 1930. Only stone foundations and old maps remain as evidence of these Absentee Shawnee homes.

=== 1891 Land Run ===
Harper's Weekly October 3, 1891, The Rush for Oklahoma

On September 22, 1891, at 12 o'clock noon, by proclamation of President Benjamin Harrison, the second Oklahoma land run began, opening 6,097 homesteads of 160 acres each in what would become Lincoln and Pottawatomie counties. The Citizen Potawatomi and Absentee Shawnee were paid by the US Government sixty-nine cents for each acre that would become the town of Pink. The claimant for each homestead was required to pay $1.50 per acre upon filing a claim in Guthrie or Oklahoma City, and required to reside on the land for at least five years.

During the 1889 and 1891 Land Runs, Texans and other Southern Democrats took up land suitable for cotton production north of the Red River. These Southerners carried Democratic "yellow-dog" propensities into the territory as far north as the Oklahoma City-Pink-Tecumseh area.

=== Challenges to settlement ===
In 1936, John Fortson wrote about the difficulties faced by early settlers of Pottawatomie County:

Settlers in Pottawatomie County were confronted with problems from which the settlers of Oklahoma territory, opened in 1889, were free. Oklahoma territory was devoid of inhabitants at the opening, and particularly of an Indian population possessing livestock. Tribes in Pottawatomie County were already settled on farms, and to the east the Creeks and Seminoles possessed cattle and horses and some revenue from farming and leasing land to the whites.

Oklahoma territory settlers found trains and telegraph lines crossing the country, while the Pottawatomie area was un-traversed by either. Pottawatomie County was nearly always torn with internal dissension and always at cross purpose with territorial authorities. Top these statements with the fact that this county bordered Indian territory on two sides, and you have the reason why the county became a rendezvous immediately after the opening for many outlaws operating at the time, and produced such law violators as Black Jack Christian and his brother Bob of the High Five Gang, George Waightman (alias Red Buck) of the Doolin-Dalton Gang, and George “Hookie” Miller, who after years of crime became a US Deputy Marshal.

This scarlet chapter is due principally to the “line” saloon towns that sprang up along the territorial boundary, to the outlaws operating in both territories that found these places convenient hangouts, and to the cattle and horse stealing done by these outlaws. Early day criminal dockets are long lists of trials for horse stealing. Until the Anti-Horse Thief association began functioning effectively at the turn of the century, farmers found it difficult to keep enough livestock to farm.

Two definite trails were used by the outlaws to move their stolen horses out of the county, relates John Hatfield, veteran peace officer. Both entered the county almost due west of Tecumseh [most likely through present-day Pink]. One branched off to the north, passing through the vicinity of old Shawneetown and leaving the county near Keokuk Falls. The other branched south, leaving the county at a point between Maud and old Violet Springs.

'On these trails,' Hatfield says, 'stations were established every 25 miles or so. A man would pick up a horse, say, at Violet Springs. He would ride that night to the station located west of Tecumseh, then return to Violet Springs with another horse before his neighbors could become suspicious. The stolen horse would be taken on west by other riders, who in turn would ride back with horses stolen in the west. Thus through this convenient "shipping" method, the thieves were able to market their wares at spots far distant from the scene of the theft.'

In April 1900, the Tecumseh Republican encouraged the formation of an Anti Horse Thief Association to combat the perpetual problem that plagued area farmers. A scheme was proposed whereby each member would pay a levy if another member's horse was stolen, thereby reducing the financial impact to the unfortunate member.

=== Early inhabitants ===
Absentee Shawnee allottees of 1891 in what became the town of Pink included Rufus Coons (S ½ SE ¼ Section 7), Nellie McCoy (SW ¼ Section 7), Se-So-Tay-Se (N ½ Section 7), Owen Gobbler (E ½ SW ¼ Section 9), Tha-Ke-Tep-Pie (Gobbler) (E ½ Section 9), Jacob Tomahawk (S ½ Section 14), Ja-Squa-Way-Se (W ½ Sw ¼ Section 18), Nad-Pe-Tok-Ca (E ½ SW ¼ Section 18), Ne-Ah-Qua (Pecan) (N ½ NW ¼ Section 18), Pa-Na-Ya-Sker-Ca (S ½ NW ¼ Section 18), John Coons (E ½ Section 18).

These original Indian allotments were not always settled upon. One exception was part of the 1891 allotment for Nellie McCoy (Now-Ah-Lo-Pea-SE), identified as Township 9N Range 2E Section 7 Lot 4 and SE¼ SW¼. A stone foundation has been located on the southern edge of this tract corresponding to a dwelling noted by the 1930 USGS Survey, likely occupied by Nellie or her relatives. Upon Nellie’s death the allotment passed to her husband John Pecan and her two sisters and brother in 1928. The USGS Survey depicts several other dwellings on adjacent land in Cleveland County that may also have been inhabited by Absentee Shawnee prior to 1930 and abandoned prior to 1956 when all of these houses were no longer shown on the survey maps due to their abandonment, decay and difficulty of access.

This part of Nellie McCoy's allotment was transferred to William A and Norma Jean Mays in 1964, and later sold to William Reeves Laney and Joyce Ann Fredrickson Laney. The Laneys combined Nellie's land with adjacent property and built Wicklow in 1980, a modern interpretation of an 1850 antebellum plantation home. Ownership of Wicklow transferred to Stanley and Betty Faulk in December 2005. The Faulks subsequently designated 100 acres of the property as the "Nellie McCoy Nature Reserve" for the protection of Cross Timbers flora and fauna as well as Native American and American pioneer history.

The town of Pink emerged sometime after the land run and before January 24, 1894 when the United States Post Office Department designated the Pink post office to be operated by Joseph Fahnestock. For some reason Fahnestock declined his appointment as postmaster, however the next month Thomas M. McKittrick accepted the postmaster job. McKittrick's wife Laura died one year later in February 1895, leaving her husband and seven children. The post office was moved to Michael Sheyers' place on Section 16, where Laura was buried, and Sheyers was appointed postmaster. McKittrick reportedly planned to move his family to Missouri soon thereafter. The post office was discontinued in January 1897, reestablished in 1901, just to be discontinued permanently in February 1906. The Tecumseh post office now serves the town.

A cemetery was established at the corner of present-day Fishmarket Rd and Willow View Rd. The stones were dozed away to make way for land development, with the graves likely not relocated. A number of early Pink residents have been buried in either the Black Cemetery, earliest burial in 1893, or Brown Cemetery, earliest burial in 1892. As evidenced by the headstones, there was an increasing number of births beginning in 1891, coinciding with the Land Run.

Brown, about three miles east of the original center of Pink, was named for George Brown. George came from Arkansas, established a farm, and became the first postmaster of Brown. Postal business was conducted out of his home, a 16 by 18-foot log cabin. The post office operated until February 14, 1906, when its services and that of the Pink post office were consolidated in Tecumseh. At one time the town had a cotton gin, two stores, a school, doctors and an undertaking parlor. Brown has been absorbed into the town of Pink.

=== Early maps ===
The 1891 Oklahoma and Indian Territories map portrays Shawneetown (Shawnee) as the only settlement north of Little River in the future Pottawatomie County. Pink appears later on Cram's 1898 Oklahoma and Indian Territory Map.] Topographic mapping of Pink and Pottawatomie County began sometime after 1903. Pink School was built sometime prior to its depiction on the 1910 McComb Quadrangle at the northwest corner of Section 28, Brinton Township (now corner of Okay Rd and Willow View Rd).

Unlike some other places in Oklahoma and Indian Territories, there were no railroads established in the county until after the 1891 Land Run. As late as 1906 the focus in mapmaking was still on depicting railroads, by which time several lines had been built in the county. None would ever come closer to Pink than about 10 miles, which guaranteed lesser importance for the town in an age dominated by railroads.

Although there was no railroad, an east–west road sprang up very early in Pink over which cotton was transported from the eastern part of the county to the Atchison, Topeka and Santa Fe Railway in Norman until the Choctaw, Oklahoma and Gulf Railroad was opened for business in Shawnee in February 1896. This east–west road is depicted on the Oklahoma 1916 Highway Map, the oldest existing such highway map for the state. The road was in reality little more than a dirt trail that became one of the first numbered roads in the state. What began as Highway 37 (1927) became Highway 41 (1932), renumbered to Highway 9 (1938), and finally paved in 1941. Erosion and the difficulty of creek crossings forced abandonment of the original location of the road between 1927 and 1932. The permanent scar of the old highway can still be seen sporadically through wooded land due west of the intersection of Fishmarket Rd and the existing Highway 9.

=== Early business ===
By 1928 the town center was located just east of what is now Fishmarket Road on Highway 9. In the early years of Pink, Walter Reuben Stapp, a blacksmith by trade, operated a gristmill located on the west side of present-day Fishmarket Rd 1/2 mile south of Highway 9. Osco A. Miller received a homestead patent in 1905 and ran a general store, traveling frequently to Tecumseh and Shawnee looking after personal business matters as well as School District 114 business. The store was later owned by J.R. McLaughlin, then A.C. Stapp and J.M. Stumpp. As late as 1936, the Tecumseh Cotton Oil Company maintained a location on Miller's property at the southeast corner of present-day Highway 9 and Fishmarket Rd.

Agriculture played a big role in the establishment of the town. First planted in the Choctaw Nation in 1825, by 1907 nearly 25% of Oklahoma's cultivated acreage was planted in cotton. Hundreds of cotton gins processed the lint into five-hundred-pound bales and separated the seed from the fiber. Compressing plants pressed and stored bales, textile plants processed the fiber, and cottonseed oil mills crushed seeds, using the residue oil for food products, the linters to make paper, the hulls to mix with livestock feeds, and the cake and meal to feed animals.

Cottonseed oil production increased dramatically in the early 20th century with the introduction of Wesson cooking oil in 1899 and Procter & Gamble's Crisco in 1911, both utilizing the oil. Cottonseed produced by Pink farmers found its way into the marketplace after being processed at one of the several dozen cottonseed oil mills in Oklahoma.

General farming, cotton, livestock, dairy and poultry were the main types of farming in Pink in 1935.

=== Agrarian Socialism ===
In 1917 a radical tenant farmers' organization called the Green Corn Rebellion "Working Class Union (WCU)" claimed membership of 35,000 in the state of Oklahoma. Seventy-five percent of 24-year-old Oklahoma farmers rented the land they worked, and many found their economic prospects hopeless. With no interest in fighting a "rich man's war" in Europe, they found themselves at odds with the recently imposed draft.

The WCU was more of a secret society, complete with night riding and physical violence against its opponents. Although it is unknown how many Pink farmers were members of this organization, it is likely that at least some sympathized with the 50 active members centered around neighboring Brown. This local group held meetings in dugouts, abandoned farmhouses, in the woods and other convenient places. A neighbor, D.O. Barton, who later became a Pottawatomie County deputy, reported them to the federal government, the local revolt was quashed, and five men were convicted of conspiracy.

Some young Pink residents may have been members of the Jones Family, a group active in the Socialist movement during World War I. A few of the group's youth were thought to be participants in the Green Corn Rebellion. This group met three miles southwest of Pink at the Mardock Mission (also known as Big Jim's Mission), built in 1898 by the Maine Branch of the Women's National Indian Association. The Mission was originally built to serve as a school, religious building, and agricultural experiment station for Big Jim's Absentee Shawnee, however it also attracted a number of white settlers as they migrated into the area. By 1907, the now non-existent town of Mardock had a post office, two stores and a cotton gin.

Sixty-two percent of farms in Pottawatomie County were still inhabited by tenant farmers in 1930, with the state average being 61.5%. The plight of the tenant farmer had changed little in Pink and the state of Oklahoma since the Green Corn Rebellion. An average of sixty-seven acres were operated per man for all agricultural uses in the county in 1930, comparable with surrounding counties.

=== Resource depletion ===
In a rush to get land into production, many early farmers cut down pecan trees without realizing the value of the nuts. It wasn't until about 1920 that the value of a pecan crop was recognized, and by 1935 it was the second largest cash crop in the county, behind alfalfa.

Many soils around Pink are highly erodible when disturbed. Intensive farming of the land diminished growing capacity and increased soil erosion. Like so many places in Oklahoma, agriculture declined by the 1930s. Some prime cropland still exists, primarily near streams and on bottomland. Livestock farming and residential are now the main land uses.

Erosion and soil exhaustion drove a number of residents to the southeastern part of the county in search of better land, more rain, and work in oil production. By 1936 the western half of the county, including Pink, averaged 20 inhabitants per square mile, less than in 1908.

A few oilfieds were developed around Pink in the early 20th century, with production declining as the years passed. The area was reconsidered for petroleum extraction beginning after 2000, with some new wells entered into production. Cannon Operating of Garland, Texas has invested in new wells on Section 18 adjacent to Highway 9 since 2014.

== Geography ==
Pink is located at 35°13′56″N 97°6′25″W (35.232145, -97.107072). According to the United States Census Bureau, the town has a total area of 26.0 square miles (67 km^{2}), all land.

=== Cross Timbers ===
Pink is situated in the Cross Timbers, a belt of low, rolling hills that is covered by a mix of pastureland, rangeland, and woodland. Forty minutes from downtown Oklahoma City on State Highway 9 between Tecumseh and Norman, Pink is in Frontier Country, the central region of Oklahoma that was once part of the American frontier. Although Oklahoma’s territorial frontier days have ended, many inhabitants believe that the spirit of this thriving crossroads region embodies the independence of bygone days. The Cross Timbers is a small and unique ecoregion that stretches from Kansas to Texas. Millions of 200 to 400-year-old trees have survived in areas unsuitable for farming. The Cross Timbers is one of the least disturbed natural places in the eastern United States, with some of the ancient post oak forest appearing just as it did 6000 years ago.

Washington Irving, the famous American author best known for "Rip Van Winkle" and "The Legend of Sleepy Hollow", visited Indian Territory in the autumn of 1832. Irving's journey began and ended in Fort Gibson, Oklahoma. On October 31, the expedition descended the Little River valley. The whole valley was flooded, and it was difficult to find a safe spot to cross the river. After finally crossing it south of Norman on the morning of November 1, they swung northeast toward to the Tecumseh area and then proceeded through northwestern Seminole County. The Daughters of the American Revolution erected a monument in 1932 commemorating the hundredth anniversary of Washington Irving’s trip through the area. The monument was moved to its current location at the Washington Irving Memorial Roadside Park in Little Axe about 1969 due to a highway change at the original site. The marker is commemorative only, and does not mark the location of Irving's route, which likely passed south of Pink. Nevertheless, his account of the area is highly representative of the topography and conditions typical in the 1830s.

Irving's travels were chronicled in A Tour on the Prairies in which he described the Cross Timbers:

The Cross Timber is about forty miles in breadth, and stretches over a rough country of rolling hills, covered with scattered tracts of post-oak and black-jack; with some intervening valleys, which, at proper seasons, would afford good pasturage. It is very much cut up by deep ravines, which, in the rainy seasons, are the beds of temporary streams, tributary to the main rivers, and these are called 'branches.' The whole tract may present a pleasant aspect in the fresh time of the year, when the ground is covered with herbage; when the trees are in their green leaf, and the glens are enlivened by running streams. Unfortunately, we entered it too late in the season The herbage was parched; the foliage of the scrubby forests was withered; the whole woodland prospect, as far as the eye could reach, had a brown and arid hue. The fires made on the prairies by the Indian hunters, had frequently penetrated these forests, sweeping in light transient flames along the dry grass, scorching and calcining the lower twigs and branches of the trees, and leaving them black and hard, so as to tear the flesh of man and horse that had to scramble through them. I shall not easily forget the mortal toil, and the vexations of flesh and spirit, that we underwent occasionally, in our wanderings through the Cross Timber. It was like struggling through forests of cast iron.

The hills, cuestas, and ridges of Pink and the surrounding Northern Cross Timbers are naturally covered by a mosaic of oak, savanna, scrubby oak forest, eastern redcedar, and tall grass prairie. Native on porous, coarse-textured soils derived from sandstone are post oak, blackjack oak, and understory grasses. Tallgrass prairie naturally occurs on fine-textured soils derived from limestone or shale. Fire suppression has increased forest density and allows eastern red cedar to invade the landscape.

=== Climate ===
Pink has a humid subtropical climate, with frequent variations in weather daily and seasonally, except during the consistently hot and sometimes humid summer months. The area is subject to prolonged and severe droughts, sometimes resulting in wildfires. Conversely, occasional very heavy rainfall occurs with flash flood potential. Consistent winds, usually from the south or southwest during the summer, help temper the hotter weather. Consistent northerly winds during the winter can intensify cold periods. Severe ice storms and snowstorms happen sporadically during the winter. The average temperature is about 61 °F (16.1 °C). Temperatures range from an average daytime high of 94 °F (34.4 °C) in August to an average low of 26 °F (-3.3 °C) in January. The growing season averages approximately 212 days.

Pink receives about 39 inches (99 cm) of precipitation annually with an average of one inch (2.54 cm) of snow. One in five years receive 10 or more inches (25.4 cm) of snow. Thunderstorms occur on about 49 days each year, predominantly in the spring and summer. Pink has a very active severe weather season from March through June, especially during April and May. Located in the Texas/Oklahoma/Kansas core of Tornado Alley, the area is prone to especially frequent and severe tornadoes as well as very severe hailstorms and occasional derechoes.

The Cross Timbers have substantial paleoclimatic value. The post oak trees in this area have recorded regional and large-scale weather and climatic extremes spanning the past 350 years, some with profound ecological and human consequences. A network of precipitation-sensitive post oak chronologies has been developed from living trees and historic building timbers. These proxies provide an accurate history of past moisture anomalies, including "the monsoon" of 1813-1850, followed by a prolonged drought and environmental crisis in the 1850s which was worse than the 1930s Dust Bowl.

An F1 tornado damaged the Pink Baptist Church during the 1999 Oklahoma tornado outbreak on May 3. Three tornadoes touched down on May 10, 2010 – an EF2, and EF3 and an EF4. Homes were destroyed, wide swaths of trees were flattened and hail damage was widespread.

== Demographics ==
Historical population
| Census | Pop. | Note | %± |
|---|---|---|---|
| 1970 | 337 | | — |
| 1980 | 911 | | 170.3% |
| 1990 | 1,020 | | 12.0% |
| 2000 | 1,165 | | 14.2% |
| 2010 | 2,058 | | 76.7% |
| 2020 | 2,091 | | 1.6% |
U.S. Decennial Census

=== 2020 census ===
As of the 2020 census, Pink had a population of 2,091. The median age was 42.4 years. 23.1% of residents were under the age of 18 and 16.6% of residents were 65 years of age or older. For every 100 females there were 103.4 males, and for every 100 females age 18 and over there were 106.0 males age 18 and over.

0.0% of residents lived in urban areas, while 100.0% lived in rural areas.

There were 781 households in Pink, of which 29.1% had children under the age of 18 living in them. Of all households, 56.0% were married-couple households, 19.7% were households with a male householder and no spouse or partner present, and 18.7% were households with a female householder and no spouse or partner present. About 20.9% of all households were made up of individuals and 9.8% had someone living alone who was 65 years of age or older.

There were 845 housing units, of which 7.6% were vacant. The homeowner vacancy rate was 1.3% and the rental vacancy rate was 3.5%.

Racial composition as of the 2020 census
| Race | Number | Percent |
|---|---|---|
| White | 1,606 | 76.8% |
| Black or African American | 13 | 0.6% |
| American Indian and Alaska Native | 160 | 7.7% |
| Asian | 6 | 0.3% |
| Native Hawaiian and Other Pacific Islander | 0 | 0.0% |
| Some other race | 27 | 1.3% |
| Two or more races | 279 | 13.3% |
| Hispanic or Latino (of any race) | 100 | 4.8% |

=== Income ===
The 2012 median income for a household in the town was $46,588, with median monthly housing costs of $671. The median income for a family was $37,857. Males had a median income of $35,263 versus $26,719 for females. The per capita income for the town was $19,199. About 11.2% of families and 15.7% of the population were below the poverty line (up from 11% in 2000), including 21.3% of those under age 18 and 14% of those age 65 or over.

=== 2010 census ===
As of the 2010 census there were 2,058 people, 732 households, and 567 families residing in the town. The population density was 44.9 inhabitants per square mile (17.3/km^{2}). There were 819 housing units at an average density of 18.0 per square mile (6.9/km^{2}). The racial makeup of the town was 84.5% White, 0.3% African American, 8.6% Native American, 0.4% Asian, 0% Pacific Islander, 0.5% from other races, and 5.8% from two or more races. Hispanic or Latino of any race were 4% of the population.

There were 732 households, out of which 30.7% had children under the age of 18 living with them, 61.6% were married couples living together, 9.3% had a female householder with no husband present, and 22.5% were non-families. 18.7% of all households were made up of individuals, and 6.8% had someone living alone who was 65 years of age or older. The average household size was 2.81 and the average family size was 3.17.

In the town, the population was spread out, with 27.3% under the age of 18, 7.9% from 18 to 24, 22.8% from 25 to 44, 30.7% from 45 to 64, and 11.4% who were 65 years of age or older. The median age was 38.4 years. For every 100 females, there were 103.8 males. For every 100 females age 18 to 64, there were 101.6 males.

The 2012 median income for a household in the town was $46,588, with median monthly housing costs of $671. The median income for a family was $37,857. Males had a median income of $35,263 versus $26,719 for females. The per capita income for the town was $19,199. About 11.2% of families and 15.7% of the population were below the poverty line (up from 11% in 2000), including 21.3% of those under age 18 and 14% of those age 65 or over.

== Government ==
Oklahoma City expanded into Pottawatomie County in 1962 during an aggressive expansion that covered portions of five counties. The annexation frenzy lasted for 34 years beginning in 1955. Norman expanded eastward to within a few miles of Pink to protect itself from Oklahoma City annexation, further threatening the autonomy and rural status of Pink. In response, Pink was incorporated in the late 1960s, effectively blocking further expansion of Oklahoma City and Norman into western Pottawatomie County.

In 1977 a town hall and fire station were built south of Highway 9 at Okay Rd and Sandy Rock Rd. A Senior Citizens Center was added in later years. A minimum lot size of two and a half acres, with most being more than 10 acres, maintains a rural lifestyle. A number of larger tracts of 80 or more acres still remain.

The Town of Pink is governed by a mayor and representatives from each of five wards. The town has grown periodically through small annexations.

2024 Board of Trustees - Town of Pink

- Ward 1: Lisa Van Liew, Mayor, Clerk/Treasurer
- Ward 2: Vincent Hall
- Ward 3: David Dunn
- Ward 4: Mike Green, Vice Mayor
- Ward 5: David Owens
- Clerk/Treasurer: Lisa Van Liew

== Education ==
Most of Pink is within the Tecumseh Public Schools school district, providing K-12 education through an early learning center, two elementary schools, a middle school and a high school. An area in the north is served by Bethel Public Schools, with two elementary, one middle school and one high school. Portions of southern Pink are in Macomb Public Schools and western portions are in Little Axe Public Schools.

The University of Oklahoma in Norman, and Oklahoma Baptist University in Shawnee are each within a 20-minute drive.

== Culture ==
On June 12, 1949, Brendle Baptist Mission's twenty-three members met and formed Pink Baptist Church on Highway 9. Brother Clovis Hibbard was the church's first pastor, and work on the first building began in August 1949. The sanctuary, nursery, gymnasium and several classrooms were damaged in the 1999 Oklahoma tornado outbreak. Church services were held in the gym until the new sanctuary was dedicated on June 23, 2002.

Pink Holiness Church is located about one mile east of Pink Baptist Church.

Camp Sooner, owned and operated by the Independent Christian Churches of Oklahoma and Texas, offers a retreat center, dining hall, cabins, swimming pool and activities in a Christian setting.

== Health ==
Health care is available in Tecumseh, Shawnee and Norman. The nearby Little Axe Health Center operated by the Absentee Shawnee Tribal Health System currently serves only Native Americans, Soonercare members and insured AST employees.

== Transportation ==
There is no public transportation. Residents must rely on automobiles due to the rural location. Passenger rail service is available on the Heartland Flyer from Oklahoma City to Fort Worth, Texas at the Norman Amtrak station. Efforts are underway to expand service north to Newton, Kansas to connect with the Southwest Chief with direct lines to Los Angeles and Chicago. The nearest commercial airport is Will Rogers World Airport in Oklahoma City.

A widening of Highway 9 to four lanes through Pink is scheduled to begin with right-of-way purchases and utility relocation in 2020, with completion of the project in 2025.
