= Little Axe Public Schools =

School district in Oklahoma, United States

Little Axe Public Schools is a school district in Oklahoma. Headquartered in Norman, it includes an elementary school, a middle school, and a high school.

Mostly located in Cleveland County, the district includes portions of Norman and Oklahoma City. The district extends into Pottawatomie County, where it includes portions of Pink.

The Student Enrollment is approximately 1,153 students across all grades (Pre-K through 12) and the Student-Teacher Ratio is around 13.88 students per teacher.

== History ==
In 2000, the district had 1,338 students. That year, Barry Damrill became the superintendent.

In June 2011, Damrill entered retirement, something the district community did not anticipate.
