= Johnson, Oklahoma =

- Town
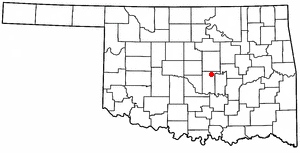
- Location of Johnson, Oklahoma
- Coordinates: 35°24′23″N 96°50′40″W
- Country: United States
- State: Oklahoma
- County: Pottawatomie

Area
  - Total: 4.47 sq mi (11.59 km^{2})
  - Land: 4.47 sq mi (11.58 km^{2})
  - Water: 0.0039 sq mi (0.01 km^{2})
- Elevation: 1,043 ft (318 m)

Population (2020)
  - Total: 457
  - Density: 102.2/sq mi (39.45/km^{2})
- Time zone: UTC-6 (Central (CST))
  - Summer (DST): UTC-5 (CDT)
- FIPS code: 40-38200
- GNIS feature ID: 2412806
- Website: www.townofjohnsonok.com

Johnson is a town in north-central Pottawatomie County, Oklahoma, United States. As of the 2020 census, Johnson had a population of 457.

== Geography ==
According to the United States Census Bureau, the town has a total area of 4.0 square miles (10 km^{2}), all land.

== History ==
In 1982 residents decided to incorporate to stop Shawnee's plans to establish a landfill near the Johnson community. On May 11, 1982, citizens voted 77 to 40 in favor of incorporation.

== Demographics ==
Historical population
Census	Pop.	Note	%±
1990	196		—
2000	223		13.8%
2010	247		10.8%
2020	457		85.0%
U.S. Decennial Census

=== 2020 census ===
As of the 2020 census, Johnson had a population of 457. The median age was 40.8 years. 20.8% of residents were under the age of 18 and 17.3% of residents were 65 years of age or older. For every 100 females there were 120.8 males, and for every 100 females age 18 and over there were 112.9 males age 18 and over.

0.0% of residents lived in urban areas, while 100.0% lived in rural areas.

There were 172 households in Johnson, of which 35.5% had children under the age of 18 living in them. Of all households, 62.8% were married-couple households, 20.3% were households with a male householder and no spouse or partner present, and 12.2% were households with a female householder and no spouse or partner present. About 16.8% of all households were made up of individuals and 9.3% had someone living alone who was 65 years of age or older.

There were 186 housing units, of which 7.5% were vacant. The homeowner vacancy rate was 2.0% and the rental vacancy rate was 10.7%.

Racial composition as of the 2020 census
Race	Number	Percent
White	335	73.3%
Black or African American	4	0.9%
American Indian and Alaska Native	69	15.1%
Asian	1	0.2%
Native Hawaiian and Other Pacific Islander	0	0.0%
Some other race	3	0.7%
Two or more races	45	9.8%
Hispanic or Latino (of any race)	23	5.0%

=== 2000 census ===
As of the 2000 census, the population density was 56.5 inhabitants per square mile (21.8/km^{2}).

The median income for a household in the town was $29,464, and the median income for a family was $30,893. Males had a median income of $29,844 versus $25,417 for females. The per capita income for the town was $15,305. About 9.9% of families and 9.2% of the population were below the poverty line, including 11.1% of those under the age of eighteen and none of those 65 or over.

== Education ==
It is in the North Rock Creek Public School school district.
