= Aydelotte, Oklahoma =

Aydelotte
- Unincorporated community
- Location within the state of Oklahoma Aydelotte (the United States)
- Coordinates: 35°26′39″N 96°54′42″W
- Country: United States
- State: Oklahoma
- County: Pottawatomie
- Elevation: 991 ft (302 m)
- Time zone: UTC-6 (Central (CST))
  - Summer (DST): UTC-5 (CDT)
- GNIS feature ID: 1089773

Aydelotte is a community located in Pottawatomie County, Oklahoma, United States. It is north of Shawnee and just south of Meeker along Oklahoma State Highway 18. The town as platted by the Santa Fe Railroad in 1903 was called Hansmeyer, but became Aydelotte for one of the railroad employees, J.M. Aydelotte.
