= Oklahoma State Highway 270 =

State highway in Oklahoma, United States

State Highway 270
- SH-270 highlighted in red

Route information
- Maintained by ODOT
- Length: 14.45 mi (23.26 km)
- Existed: 1979 (March 5?)–present

Major junctions
- West end: US 62 in Harrah
- SH-102 in McLoud
- East end: US 177 north of Shawnee

Location
- Country: United States
- State: Oklahoma
- Counties: Oklahoma, Pottawatomie

Highway system
- Oklahoma State Highway System; Interstate; US; State; Turnpikes
← US 270	→ US 271

State Highway 270, abbreviated as SH-270, is a 14.45-mile-long (23.26 km) state highway in Oklahoma and Pottawatomie counties in Oklahoma, United States. It runs on a former alignment of U.S. Route 270 (US-270) between US-62 in Harrah and US-177 north of Shawnee. (US-270 is now concurrent with Interstate 40 through the area.) SH-270 has no lettered spur routes.

== Route description ==
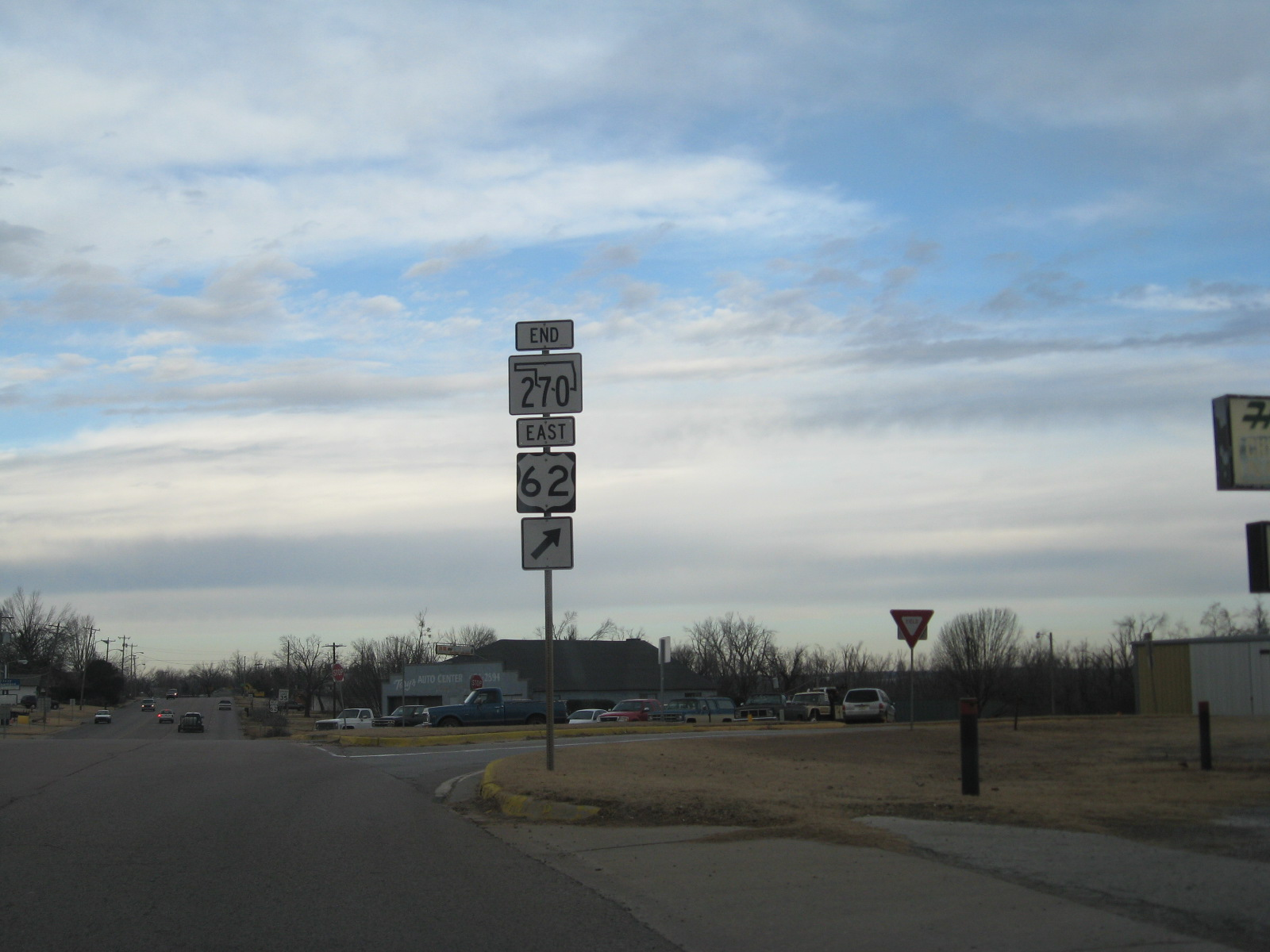
SH-270's western terminus at US-62, January 2008

State Highway 270 begins at US-62 in Harrah, in Oklahoma County. The road runs through town on a southeast course, paralleling a rail line. As it leaves town, the highway gradually curves to the south. SH-270 runs along Harrah Road to S.E. 29th Street, where it makes a hard left, turning to the east.

SH-270 continues east for one mile (1.6 km) until it crosses into Pottawatomie County, where the name of the road changes to Oklahoma Street. SH-270 then enters McLoud, where it has a brief concurrency with SH-102. After leaving McLoud, it then turns back to the southeast, parallel to the same railroad it ran alongside in Harrah. SH-270 turns east upon reaching the small town of Dale. It then crosses over the railroad and the North Canadian River. After passing through Dale, it ends at US-177.

== History ==
Prior to 1979, US-270 ran through Oklahoma City on surface streets. It left the city and ran through Choctaw concurrent with US-62. US-270 split away from US-62 in Harrah, and continued on to Shawnee on what is now SH-270.

On March 5, 1979, US-270 was rerouted to run concurrent with Interstate 40 from south of Calumet in Canadian County through the Oklahoma City metro, exiting the Interstate onto a surface alignment in Shawnee. Presumably, SH-270 was commissioned the same date. The realignment of US-270, with SH-270 on the old alignment between Harrah and Shawnee, appears on the 1979 state map. SH-270 followed the same path in 1979 as it does today.

== Junction list ==
County	Location	mi	km	Destinations	Notes
Oklahoma	Harrah	0.0	0.0	US 62	Western terminus
Pottawatomie	McLoud	7.7	12.4	SH-102	Western end of SH-102 concurrency
Pottawatomie	McLoud	7.9	12.7	SH-102	Eastern end of SH-102 concurrency
Pottawatomie		14.4	23.2	US 177	Eastern terminus
1.000 mi = 1.609 km; 1.000 km = 0.621 mi: Concurrency terminus
