= Arcadia High School (Ohio) =

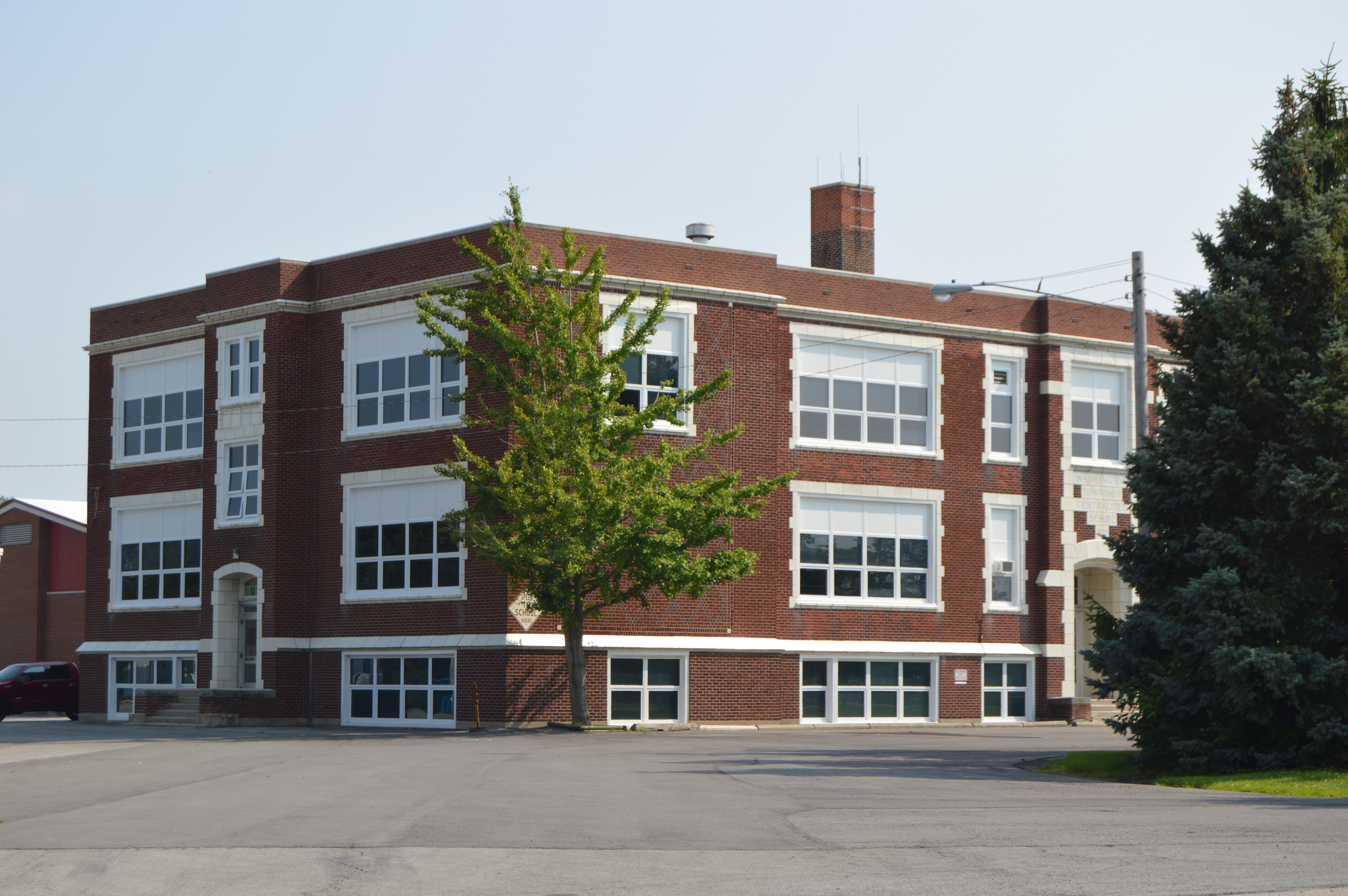
- Front of the school

Location
- 19033 State Route 12; Arcadia, Hancock County, Ohio 44804; United States
- Coordinates: 41°6′25″N 83°30′56″W

Information
- Type: Public high school
- School district: Hancock County
- Superintendent: David Golden ref name="Ohio High School Athletic Association member directory"/>
- Principal: Bill Dobbins, Jr.
- Teaching staff: 19.25 (FTE)
- Grades: 9-12
- Student to teacher ratio: 12.00
- Colors: Red and white
- Athletics: Football, basketball, baseball, track and field, volleyball, golf, wrestling, cheer
- Athletics conference: Blanchard Valley Conference
- Mascot: Redskins
- Team name: Redskins
- Rival: Vanlue, Arlington
- Website: www.arcadia.noacsc.org

Arcadia High School is a public high school in Arcadia, Ohio, United States. It is the only high school in the Arcadia Local School district. The school is a member of the Blanchard Valley Conference.

== Notable alumni ==
- Jerry Blevins, former MLB player (Oakland Athletics, Washington Nationals, New York Mets)

== See also ==
- Native American mascot controversy
- Sports teams named Redskins
