= Bellemont, Oklahoma =

Populated place in Oklahoma, US

Coordinates: 35°27′47″N 96°46′16″W

Bellemont is a populated place in Pottawatomie County, Oklahoma, at an elevation of 1,047 feet. It is located less than 7 miles west-southwest of Prague, Oklahoma.

Bellemont was one of the possible birthplaces of Jim Thorpe, Olympian in the Stockholm 1912 Olympic Games.
