= Pottawatomie County, Oklahoma =

County in Oklahoma, United States

- County
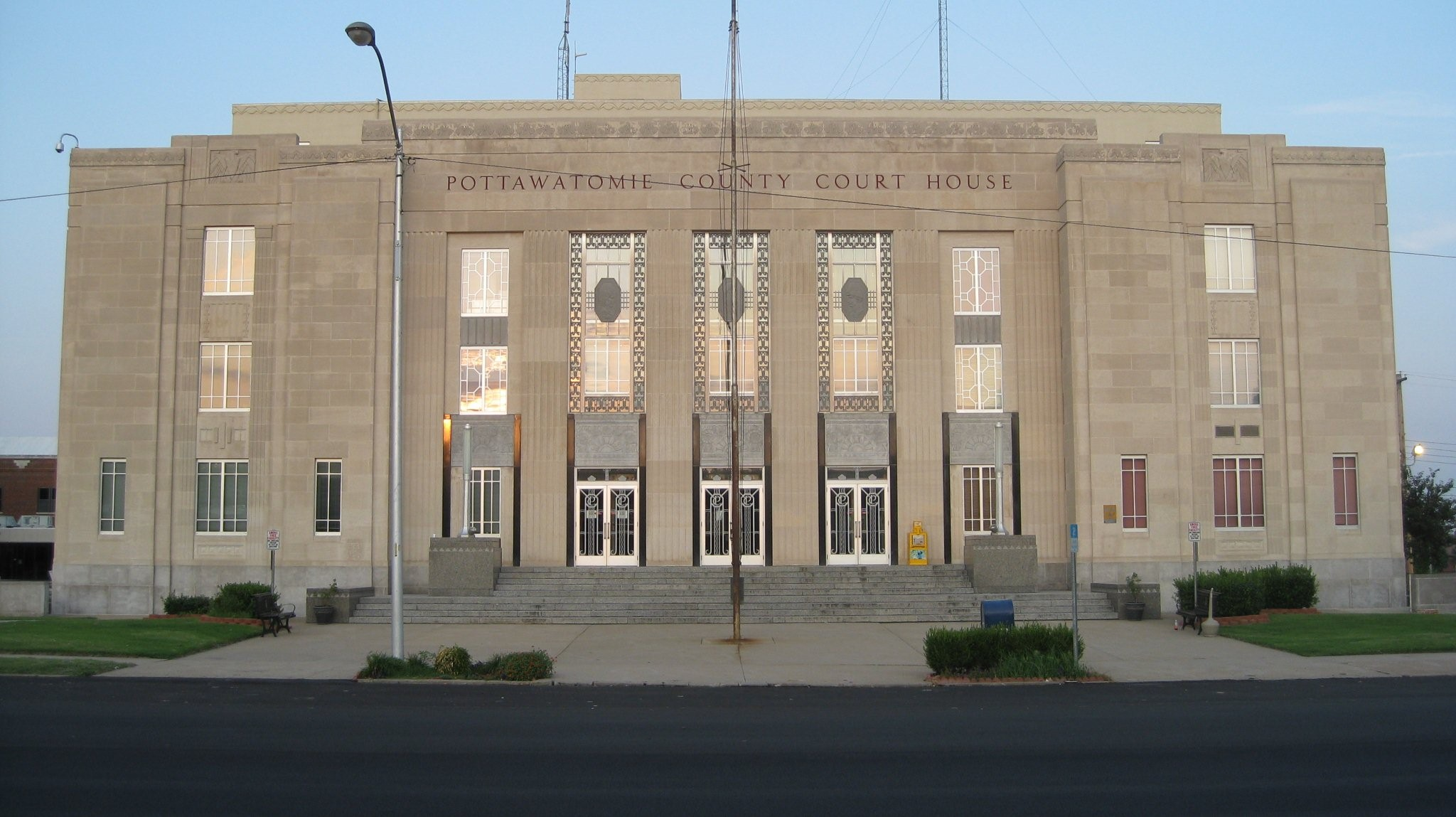
- Pottawatomie County Courthouse in Shawnee

- Location within the U.S. state of Oklahoma
- Coordinates: 35°12′N 96°56′W
- Country: United States
- State: Oklahoma
- Founded: 1891
- Named for: Potawatomi people
- Seat: Shawnee
- Largest city: Shawnee

Area
  - Total: 793 sq mi (2,050 km^{2})
  - Land: 788 sq mi (2,040 km^{2})
  - Water: 5.7 sq mi (15 km^{2}) 0.7%

Population (2020)
  - Total: 72,454
  - Estimate (2025): 75,102 ▲
  - Density: 91.9/sq mi (35.5/km^{2})
- Time zone: UTC−6 (Central)
  - Summer (DST): UTC−5 (CDT)
- Congressional district: 5th
- Website: www.pottawatomiecountyok.gov

Pottawatomie County is a county located in the U.S. state of Oklahoma. As of the 2020 census, the population was 72,454. Its county seat is Shawnee.

Pottawatomie County is part of the Shawnee, OK micropolitan statistical area, which is Pottawatomie County, Oklahoma Government in the Oklahoma City–Shawnee, OK combined statistical area.

== History ==
Pottawatomie County was carved out of land originally given to the Creek and Seminole after their forced removal from Georgia and Florida. After the Civil War, the Creek and Seminole were forced to cede their lands back to the federal government, and the area of Pottawatomie County was used to resettle the Iowa, Sac and Fox, Absentee Shawnee, Potawatomi and Kickapoo tribes.

Non-Indian settlement began on September 22, 1891, when all the tribes except the Kickapoo agreed to land allotment, where communal reservation land was divided and allotted to individual members of the tribes. The remaining land was opened to settlement.

During the land run, Pottawatomie County was organized as County "B" with Tecumseh as the county seat. In 1892, the voters of the county elected to rename County "B" as Pottawatomie County after the Potawatomi Indians.

In 1895, the Kickapoo gave up their land rights and their land was given away to white settlers in the last land run in Oklahoma.

In 1930, Shawnee, now bigger in size than Tecumseh, was approved by the voters to become the new county seat. The Pottawatomie County Court House was built in 1934 by the Public Works Administration. The court house project cost $250,000 to complete.

On May 19, 2013, during an outbreak of tornadoes, a mobile home park was nearly destroyed, killing a 79-year-old man and injuring at least six others as well as damaging at least 35 structures. Frame and brick homes west of Shawnee were also affected.

== Geography ==
According to the U.S. Census Bureau, the county has a total area of 793 square miles (2,050 km^{2}), of which 788 square miles (2,040 km^{2}) is land and 5.7 square miles (15 km^{2}) (0.7%) is water.

=== Adjacent counties ===
- Lincoln County (north)
- Okfuskee County (northeast)
- Seminole County (east)
- Pontotoc County (southeast)
- McClain County (southwest)
- Cleveland County (west)
- Oklahoma County (northwest)

== Demographics ==
Historical population
Census	Pop.	Note	%±
1900	26,412		—
1910	43,595		65.1%
1920	46,028		5.6%
1930	66,572		44.6%
1940	54,377		−18.3%
1950	43,517		−20.0%
1960	41,486		−4.7%
1970	43,134		4.0%
1980	55,239		28.1%
1990	58,760		6.4%
2000	65,521		11.5%
2010	69,442		6.0%
2020	72,454		4.3%
2025 (est.)	75,102	▲	3.7%
U.S. Decennial Census; 1790-1960 1900-1990; 1990-2000 2010-2019 2020 census

=== 2021 estimates ===
According to 2021 census estimates, its median household income was $54,896 and the county had a poverty rate of 14.4%.

=== 2020 census ===
As of the 2020 census, the county had a population of 72,454. Of the residents, 23.4% were under the age of 18 and 17.3% were 65 years of age or older; the median age was 38.6 years. For every 100 females there were 93.1 males, and for every 100 females age 18 and over there were 89.8 males.

The racial makeup of the county was 69.7% White, 3.1% Black or African American, 12.6% American Indian and Alaska Native, 0.7% Asian, 2.0% from some other race, and 11.8% from two or more races. Hispanic or Latino residents of any race comprised 5.9% of the population.

There were 26,817 households in the county, of which 31.6% had children under the age of 18 living with them and 27.1% had a female householder with no spouse or partner present. About 26.3% of all households were made up of individuals and 12.2% had someone living alone who was 65 years of age or older.

There were 29,973 housing units, of which 10.5% were vacant. Among occupied housing units, 68.0% were owner-occupied and 32.0% were renter-occupied. The homeowner vacancy rate was 1.7% and the rental vacancy rate was 10.1%.

=== 2010 census ===
As of the 2010 census, there were 69,442 people, 25,911 households, and 18,227 families residing in the county. The population density was 34/km^{2} (88/mi^{2}). There were 29,139 housing units at an average density of 14/km^{2} (36/mi^{2}). The racial makeup of the county was 76.3% white, 2.9% black or African American, 12.9% Native American, 0.6% Asian, 0.1% Pacific Islander, 0.1% from other races, and 6.3% from two or more races. About 4% of the population were Hispanic or Latino of any race, while 9% were of American, 17% German, 14% Irish and 10% English ancestry. About 90.6% spoke English and 4.2% Spanish as their first language.

As of 2010, there were 25,911 households, out of which 34.5% included children under the age of 18, 51.9% were married couples living together, 13.3% had a female householder with no husband present, 5.1% had a male householder with no wife present, and 29.7% were non-families. About a quarter of households consisted of a single individual and 9.8% had someone living alone who was 65 years of age or older. The average household size was 2.56 and the average family size was 3.04. In the county, the population was spread out, with 25% under the age of 18, 10.2% from 18 to 24, 24.6% from 25 to 44, 25.9% from 45 to 64, and 14.3% who were 65 years of age or older. The median age was 37 years. For every 100 females, there were 92.1 males. For every 100 females age 18 and over, there were 88 males.

As of 2010, the median income for a household in the county was $41,332, and the median income for a family was $50,399. Males had a median income of $39,580 versus $27,495 for females. The per capita income for the county was $20,700. About 14% of families and 18% of the population were below the poverty line, including 26.4% of those under age 18 and 10.3% of those age 65 or over.

== Government and infrastructure ==
The Pioneer Library System operates branch libraries in nine cities in Pottawatomie, Cleveland, and McClain counties.

The Oklahoma Department of Corrections operates the Mabel Bassett Correctional Center in an unincorporated area in the county, near McLoud.

== Politics ==
Voter registration and party enrollment as of June 30, 2023
Party	Number of Voters	Percentage
Republican	22,585	55.94%
Democratic	10,447	25.88%
Others	7,341	18.18%
Total	40,373	100%

United States presidential election results for Pottawatomie County, Oklahoma
Year	Republican		Democratic		Third party(ies)	
Year	No.	%	No.	%	No.	%
1908	2,609	38.79%	3,551	52.80%	566	8.42%
1912	2,107	33.75%	3,082	49.37%	1,054	16.88%
1916	2,042	31.55%	3,276	50.61%	1,155	17.84%
1920	5,355	47.56%	5,310	47.16%	595	5.28%
1924	4,040	38.81%	5,072	48.73%	1,297	12.46%
1928	8,478	68.57%	3,797	30.71%	89	0.72%
1932	4,063	25.27%	12,013	74.73%	0	0.00%
1936	4,703	27.72%	12,187	71.82%	78	0.46%
1940	6,776	35.83%	12,058	63.76%	78	0.41%
1944	6,486	41.42%	9,130	58.31%	43	0.27%
1948	4,760	31.78%	10,220	68.22%	0	0.00%
1952	10,099	51.65%	9,455	48.35%	0	0.00%
1956	8,496	48.85%	8,895	51.15%	0	0.00%
1960	9,421	53.87%	8,067	46.13%	0	0.00%
1964	6,841	38.60%	10,884	61.40%	0	0.00%
1968	6,899	39.44%	6,721	38.42%	3,873	22.14%
1972	13,308	71.30%	4,822	25.84%	534	2.86%
1976	9,090	44.19%	11,255	54.71%	226	1.10%
1980	12,466	57.05%	8,526	39.02%	858	3.93%
1984	16,143	69.40%	6,966	29.95%	152	0.65%
1988	12,099	57.15%	8,873	41.92%	197	0.93%
1992	10,350	40.47%	8,616	33.69%	6,606	25.83%
1996	9,802	45.06%	9,141	42.02%	2,810	12.92%
2000	13,235	59.31%	8,763	39.27%	318	1.42%
2004	17,215	66.59%	8,638	33.41%	0	0.00%
2008	17,753	69.18%	7,910	30.82%	0	0.00%
2012	16,250	69.33%	7,188	30.67%	0	0.00%
2016	17,848	70.12%	6,015	23.63%	1,589	6.24%
2020	20,240	71.81%	7,275	25.81%	670	2.38%
2024	20,915	72.69%	7,266	25.25%	593	2.06%

== Transportation ==
=== Major highways ===
- Interstate 40
- U.S. Highway 177
- U.S. Highway 270
- U.S. Highway 377 / State Highway 99
  - State Highway 99A
- State Highway 3
  - State Highway 3E
  - State Highway 3W
- State Highway 9
  - State Highway 9A
- State Highway 18
- State Highway 39
- State Highway 59
  - State Highway 59B
- State Highway 102
- State Highway 270

=== Airport ===
The Shawnee Regional Airport is located 2 nautical miles (3.7 km) northwest from the central business district of Shawnee. It is classified as a general aviation airport.

== Communities ==
=== Cities ===
- Oklahoma City (mostly in Oklahoma County)
- Shawnee (county seat)
- Tecumseh

=== Towns ===
- Asher
- Bethel Acres
- Brooksville
- Earlsboro
- Johnson
- Macomb
- Maud
- McLoud
- Pink
- St. Louis
- Tribbey
- Wanette

=== Census-designated place ===
- Dale

=== Other unincorporated communities ===
- Aydelotte
- Bellemont
- Harjo
- Pearson
- Romulus
- Sacred Heart

== Education ==
Higher Education:

- Oklahoma Baptist University

School districts include:

K-12:

- Asher Public Schools
- Bethel Public Schools
- Dale Public Schools
- Earlsboro Public Schools
- Harrah Public Schools
- Konawa Public Schools
- Little Axe Public Schools
- Macomb Public Schools
- Maud Public Schools
- McLoud Public Schools
- Meeker Public Schools
- North Rock Creek Public School
- Prague Public Schools
- Shawnee Public Schools
- Strother Public Schools
- Tecumseh Public Schools
- Wanette Public Schools

Elementary only:

- Grove Public School
- Pleasant Grove Public School
- South Rock Creek Public School

== NRHP Sites ==
The following sites in Pottawatomie County are listed on the National Register of Historic Places:

- Aldridge Hotel, Shawnee
- Barnard Elementary School, Tecumseh
- Beard Cabin, Shawnee
- Bell Street Historic District, Shawnee
- Billington Building, Shawnee
- H. T. Douglas Mansion and Garage, Shawnee
- Governors Mansion, Shawnee
- Kerfoot House, Shawnee
- Nuckolls House, Shawnee
- Old Santa Fe Railroad Bridge, Wanette
- Pottawatomie County Courthouse, Shawnee
- Rose—Fast Site (34PT28), Harjo
- Sacred Heart Mission Site, Asher
- Santa Fe Depot, Shawnee
- Shawnee Friends Mission, Shawnee
- St. Gregory's Abbey and College, Shawnee
- Squirrel Creek Bridge. Shawnee vicinity
- State National Bank Building, Shawnee
- Walker House, Shawnee
