= Dale, Oklahoma =

Dale
- Unincorporated community and census-designated place
- Motto: "Go Dale"
- Location within the state of Oklahoma Dale (the United States)
- Coordinates: 35°23′03″N 97°02′36″W
- Country: United States
- State: Oklahoma
- County: Pottawatomie

Government

Area
  - Total: 0.74 sq mi (1.92 km^{2})
  - Land: 0.74 sq mi (1.92 km^{2})
  - Water: 0 sq mi (0.00 km^{2})
- Elevation: 1,034 ft (315 m)

Population (2020)
  - Total: 175
  - Density: 235.9/sq mi (91.08/km^{2})
- Time zone: UTC-6 (Central (CST))
  - Summer (DST): UTC-5 (CDT)
- Area codes: 405/572
- FIPS code: 40-19150
- GNIS feature ID: 2629915

Dale is an unincorporated community and census-designated place located on State Highway 270 in Pottawatomie County, Oklahoma, United States. It lies in the North Canadian River bottom, a few miles northwest of Shawnee. The population was 175 at the time of the 2020 Census, a slight decrease over the 2010 census figure of 186.

Dale was platted along the Rock Island railroad line before statehood. The Dale Post Office opened October 26, 1893. It was initially named King in honor of John King, an Absentee-Shawnee Indian who owned the allotted land on which the community was founded. The community was renamed in 1895, for Frank Dale, the second Chief Justice of the Territorial Supreme Court (1893-1898).

== Demographics ==
Historical population
Census	Pop.	Note	%±
2020	175		—
U.S. Decennial Census

=== 2020 census ===
As of the 2020 census, Dale had a population of 175. The median age was 41.1 years. 21.7% of residents were under the age of 18 and 15.4% of residents were 65 years of age or older. For every 100 females there were 90.2 males, and for every 100 females age 18 and over there were 87.7 males age 18 and over.

0.0% of residents lived in urban areas, while 100.0% lived in rural areas.

There were 70 households in Dale, of which 31.4% had children under the age of 18 living in them. Of all households, 35.7% were married-couple households, 20.0% were households with a male householder and no spouse or partner present, and 37.1% were households with a female householder and no spouse or partner present. About 31.4% of all households were made up of individuals and 14.3% had someone living alone who was 65 years of age or older.

There were 84 housing units, of which 16.7% were vacant. The homeowner vacancy rate was 7.7% and the rental vacancy rate was 17.1%.

Racial composition as of the 2020 census
Race	Number	Percent
White	126	72.0%
Black or African American	3	1.7%
American Indian and Alaska Native	20	11.4%
Asian	1	0.6%
Native Hawaiian and Other Pacific Islander	0	0.0%
Some other race	2	1.1%
Two or more races	23	13.1%
Hispanic or Latino (of any race)	6	3.4%

== Education ==
It is in the Dale Public Schools school district.

== Sources ==
Shirk, George H. Oklahoma Place Names. Norman: University of Oklahoma Press, 1987. ISBN 0-8061-2028-2 .
