= Romulus, Oklahoma =

Romulus
- Unincorporated community
- Location within the state of Oklahoma Romulus (the United States)
- Coordinates: 35°06′59″N 96°55′24″W
- Country: United States
- State: Oklahoma
- County: Pottawatomie
- Time zone: UTC-6 (Central (CST))
  - Summer (DST): UTC-5 (CDT)

Romulus is an unincorporated community in Pottawatomie County, Oklahoma, United States. It is located east of U.S. Route 177/State Highway 3W. The locale is old enough to appear on a 1911 Rand McNally map of the county.
