= Arcadia, Ohio =

- Village
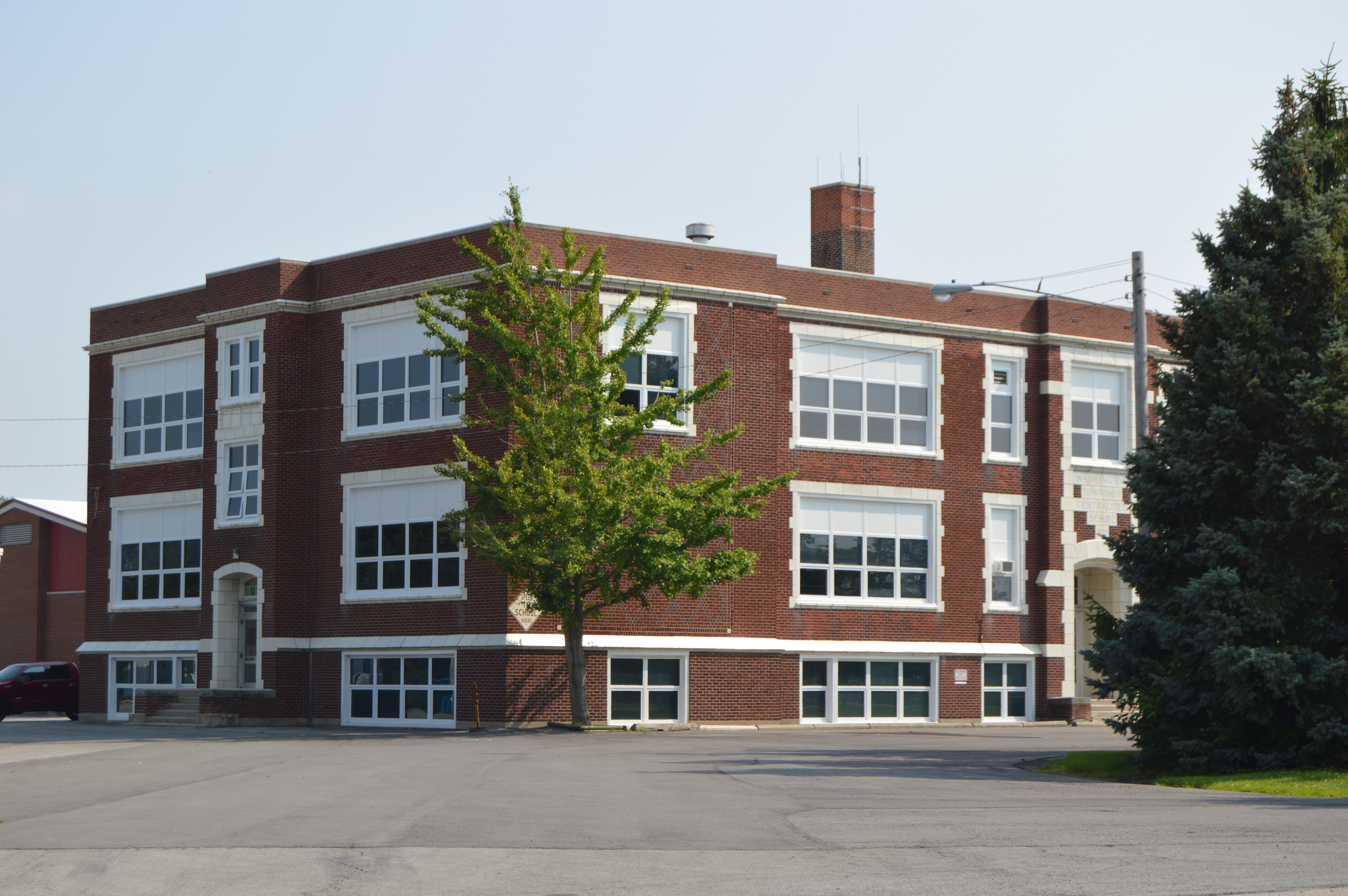
- Arcadia High School on Fremont Street

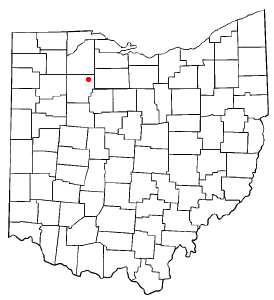
- Location of Arcadia, Ohio

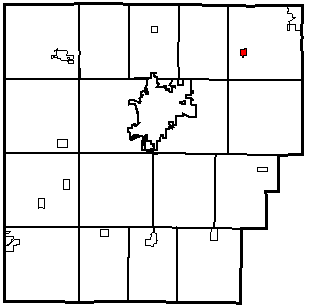
- Map of Hancock County, Ohio Highlighting Arcadia
- Coordinates: 41°06′29″N 83°30′53″W
- Country: United States
- State: Ohio
- County: Hancock

Government
  - Type: Village council

Area
  - Total: 0.57 sq mi (1.47 km^{2})
  - Land: 0.57 sq mi (1.47 km^{2})
  - Water: 0 sq mi (0.00 km^{2})
- Elevation: 807 ft (246 m)

Population (2020)
  - Total: 564
  - Estimate (2023): 555
  - Density: 994.8/sq mi (384.08/km^{2})
- Time zone: UTC-5 (Eastern (EST))
  - Summer (DST): UTC-4 (EDT)
- ZIP code: 44804
- Area code: 419
- FIPS code: 39-02316
- GNIS feature ID: 2397976
- Website: https://villageofarcadia.com/

Arcadia is a village in Hancock County, Ohio, United States. The population was 564 at the 2020 census.

== History ==
Arcadia was laid out in 1855. The village most likely was named after Arcadia, Greece. On July 21, 1903, Arcadia was damaged by a fire.

Arcadia became a qualified Tree City USA as recognized by the National Arbor Day Foundation in 2013.

== Geography ==
According to the United States Census Bureau, the village has a total area of 0.58 square miles (1.50 km^{2}), all land.

== Demographics ==
Historical population
Census	Pop.	Note	%±
1870	288		—
1880	396		37.5%
1890	490		23.7%
1900	425		−13.3%
1910	380		−10.6%
1920	376		−1.1%
1930	490		30.3%
1940	481		−1.8%
1950	529		10.0%
1960	610		15.3%
1970	689		13.0%
1980	580		−15.8%
1990	546		−5.9%
2000	537		−1.6%
2010	590		9.9%
2020	564		−4.4%
2023 (est.)	555	▼	−1.6%
U.S. Decennial Census

=== 2010 census ===
As of the census of 2010, there were 590 people, 217 households, and 156 families living in the village. The population density was 1,017.2 inhabitants per square mile (392.7/km^{2}). There were 239 housing units at an average density of 412.1 per square mile (159.1/km^{2}). The racial makeup of the village was 96.1% White, 1.4% African American, 0.2% Native American, 0.2% Asian, 0.7% from other races, and 1.5% from two or more races. Hispanic or Latino of any race were 3.1% of the population.

There were 217 households, of which 40.6% had children under the age of 18 living with them, 53.0% were married couples living together, 12.4% had a female householder with no husband present, 6.5% had a male householder with no wife present, and 28.1% were non-families. 21.2% of all households were made up of individuals, and 9.7% had someone living alone who was 65 years of age or older. The average household size was 2.72 and the average family size was 3.16.

The median age in the village was 35 years. 29.5% of residents were under the age of 18; 7.8% were between the ages of 18 and 24; 28.3% were from 25 to 44; 23% were from 45 to 64; and 11.4% were 65 years of age or older. The gender makeup of the village was 50.0% male and 50.0% female.

=== 2000 census ===
As of the census of 2000, there were 537 people, 201 households, and 137 families living in the village. The population density was 2,067.4 inhabitants per square mile (798.2/km^{2}). There were 215 housing units at an average density of 827.7 per square mile (319.6/km^{2}). The racial makeup of the village was 98.51% White, 0.37% Native American, 1.12% from other races. Hispanic or Latino of any race were 2.05% of the population.

There were 201 households, out of which 41.3% had children under the age of 18 living with them, 54.2% were married couples living together, 11.4% had a female householder with no husband present, and 31.8% were non-families. 28.9% of all households were made up of individuals, and 12.9% had someone living alone who was 65 years of age or older. The average household size was 2.67 and the average family size was 3.30.

In the village, the population was spread out, with 32.2% under the age of 18, 6.7% from 18 to 24, 33.0% from 25 to 44, 17.7% from 45 to 64, and 10.4% who were 65 years of age or older. The median age was 33 years. For every 100 females there were 96.7 males. For every 100 females age 18 and over, there were 89.6 males.

The median income for a household in the village was $48,125, and the median income for a family was $51,538. Males had a median income of $36,167 versus $20,227 for females. The per capita income for the village was $18,525. About 7.5% of families and 8.2% of the population were below the poverty line, including 11.0% of those under age 18 and 2.9% of those age 65 or over.
