= McLoud, Oklahoma =

- City
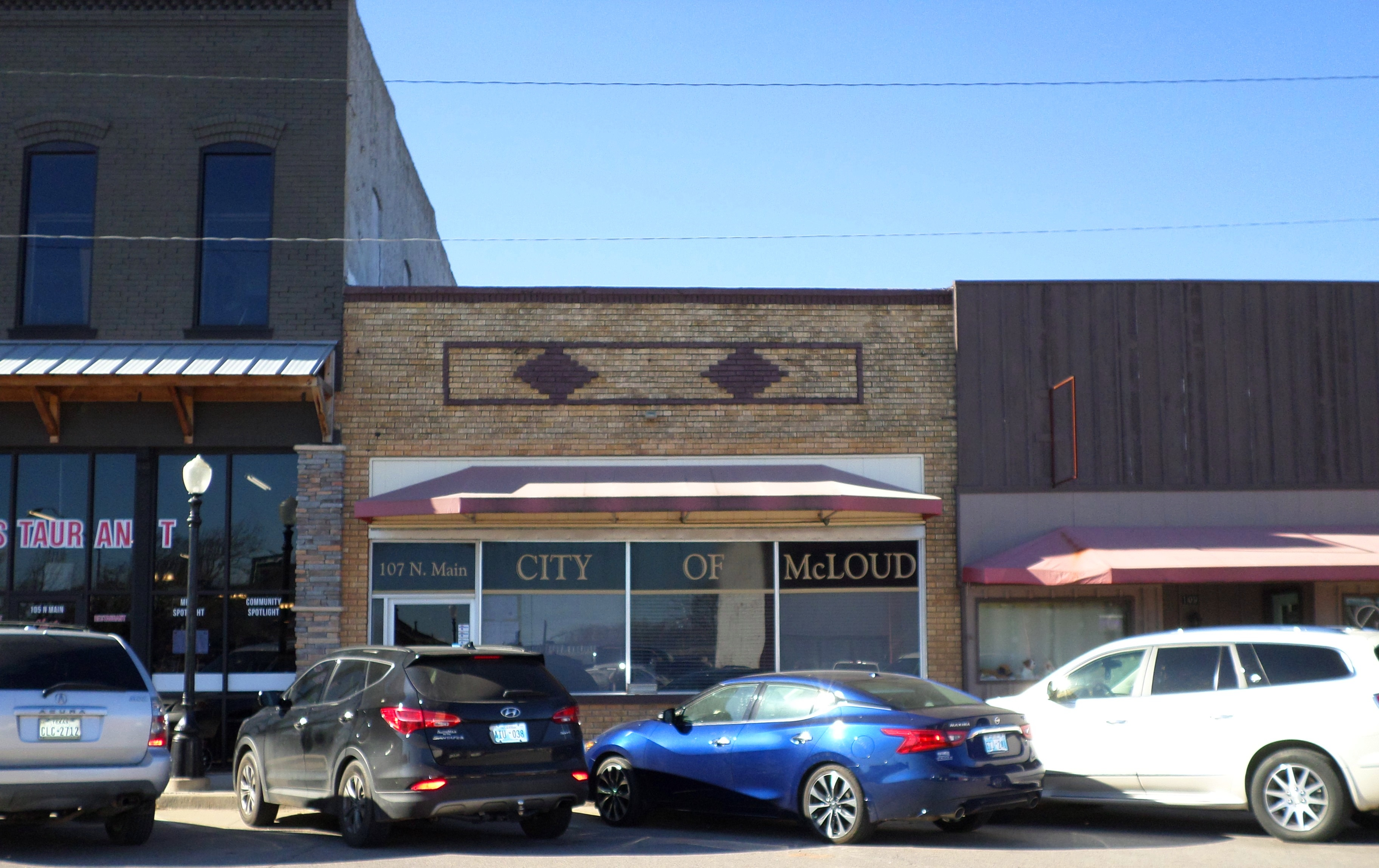
- McLoud City Hall
- Motto: Blackberry Capital of the World
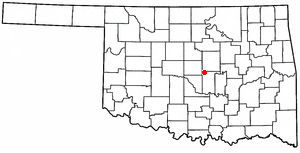
- Location of McLoud, Oklahoma
- Coordinates: 35°24′25″N 97°05′56″W
- Country: United States
- State: Oklahoma
- County: Pottawatomie

Area
  - Total: 18.10 sq mi (46.88 km^{2})
  - Land: 18.02 sq mi (46.67 km^{2})
  - Water: 0.081 sq mi (0.21 km^{2})
- Elevation: 1,083 ft (330 m)

Population (2020)
  - Total: 4,351
  - Density: 241.5/sq mi (93.23/km^{2})
- Time zone: UTC-6 (Central (CST))
  - Summer (DST): UTC-5 (CDT)
- ZIP code: 74851
- Area codes: 405/572
- FIPS code: 40-45350
- GNIS feature ID: 2412969
- Website: mcloudok.us

McLoud is a city in northwestern Pottawatomie County, Oklahoma, United States, and is part of the Oklahoma City Consolidated Metropolitan Area. As of the 2020 census, McLoud had a population of 4,351. The city was founded in 1895 and named for John W. McLoud, attorney for the Choctaw, Oklahoma and Gulf Railroad.

== History ==
Early day McLoud was known for manufacturing and selling whiskey to whites and American Indians in dry Indian Territory. Located on the North Canadian River, the original town was destroyed in a flood and was rebuilt on higher ground one mile south.

In June 1895, a post office named McCloud was established for the town, named after railroad attorney John William McLoud. The spelling of the post office name was corrected in October 1895. The town incorporated July 7, 1896. The town was an agricultural center for much of its history. By the start of the 21st century, it had become a bedroom community, with many of its residents commuting to work in other towns.

In 1949, the city was recognized as the "Blackberry Capital of the World" when the Chamber of Commerce sent a crate of blackberries to President Harry S. Truman.

== Geography ==
McLoud is approximately 22 miles (35 km) east of Oklahoma City. The North Canadian River flows past the northeast side of the city. Oklahoma Route 270 and Route 102 intersect within the town.

According to the United States Census Bureau, the town has a total area of 18.4 square miles (48 km^{2}), of which 18.3 square miles (47 km^{2}) is land and 0.1 square miles (0.26 km^{2}) (0.43%) is water.

McLoud is located in the Crosstimbers ecoregion and the Frontier Country tourism region.

== Demographics ==
Historical population
Census	Pop.	Note	%±
1900	498		—
1910	638		28.1%
1920	651		2.0%
1930	812		24.7%
1940	616		−24.1%
1950	718		16.6%
1960	837		16.6%
1970	2,159		157.9%
1980	4,061		88.1%
1990	2,493		−38.6%
2000	3,548		42.3%
2010	4,044		14.0%
2020	4,351		7.6%
U.S. Decennial Census

=== 2020 census ===
As of the 2020 census, McLoud had a population of 4,351. The median age was 37.6 years. 19.4% of residents were under the age of 18 and 13.6% of residents were 65 years of age or older. For every 100 females there were 53.5 males, and for every 100 females age 18 and over there were 45.1 males age 18 and over.

0% of residents lived in urban areas, while 100.0% lived in rural areas.

There were 1,153 households in McLoud, of which 35.3% had children under the age of 18 living in them. Of all households, 50.3% were married-couple households, 15.6% were households with a male householder and no spouse or partner present, and 27.1% were households with a female householder and no spouse or partner present. About 22.4% of all households were made up of individuals and 8.6% had someone living alone who was 65 years of age or older.

There were 1,269 housing units, of which 9.1% were vacant. Among occupied housing units, 65.0% were owner-occupied and 35.0% were renter-occupied. The homeowner vacancy rate was 1.8% and the rental vacancy rate was 8.1%.

Racial composition as of the 2020 census
Race	Percent
White	67.0%
Black or African American	5.9%
American Indian and Alaska Native	15.1%
Asian	0.6%
Native Hawaiian and Other Pacific Islander	<0.1%
Some other race	2.8%
Two or more races	8.6%
Hispanic or Latino (of any race)	5.8%

=== 2010 census ===
As of the 2010 census, there were 4,044 people and 1,102 households in the town. The racial makeup of the town was 2,910 White, 241 African American, 569 Native American, 10 Asian, 46 from some other race, and 276 from two or more races.

There were 1,102 households, out of which 356 had children under the age of 18 living with them.

In the town, the population was spread out, with 21.5% under the age of 18, 9.5% from 18 to 24, 38.7% from 25 to 44, 19.9% from 45 to 64, and 10.4% who were 65 years of age or older. The median age was 35 years. For every 100 females, there were 58.8 males. For every 100 females age 18 and over, there were 49.0 males.

The median income for a household in the town was $32,475, and the median income for a family was $37,138. Males had a median income of $30,431 versus $20,667 for females. The per capita income for the town was $12,774. About 11.6% of families and 13.4% of the population were below the poverty line, including 15.5% of those under age 18 and 16.3% of those age 65 or over.

== Government and infrastructure ==
The United States Postal Service operates the McLoud Post Office.

The Oklahoma Department of Corrections operates the Mabel Bassett Correctional Center in the city limits of McLoud in Pottawatomie County,

The City of McLoud hosts a web site for public use and access at http://www.mcloudok.us/

== Education ==
=== CareerTech ===
The city of McLoud is served by Gordon Cooper Vo-Tech in Shawnee.

=== Primary and secondary schools ===
Most of McLoud is in the McLoud Public Schools school district. Portions are in Dale Public Schools and Harrah Public Schools.

McLoud Public Schools consists of two campus sites. The McLoud Elementary campus consists of eight buildings, including the Elementary building (old intermediate), the Ola Barnett building (future board offices), the PreK building (old 2nd grade building), and the Early Childhood Center (Pre-K thru 1st grade). The new Intermediate campus is located south of the Junior High and High School. Also at the Elementary campus are the Elementary Gymnasium, the Elementary Multi-Media Center, and the Elementary SafeRoom, which provides tornado protection for the 1,000+ students, staff, and faculty.

The Secondary campus consists of ten buildings. These include McLoud Junior High School (7th & 8th grade) and High School East and West buildings (9th - 12th grades) Also included on the Secondary campus are the Secondary cafeteria, the Secondary Multimedia Center, the Business Building (now the indoor archery range), a VoAg Building and VoAg Barn, the Home Economics Building, the Fine Arts Building (Band and Drama), and the Secondary SafeRoom which provides the entire secondary campus with tornado protection.

McLoud Schools offers students access to 15 different computer labs across the District. There are four basketball gyms, baseball, football, soccer, and softball fields. McLoud Schools also has indoor practice facilities for their baseball, softball, and wrestling programs, as well as the football field house.

=== Libraries ===
McLoud is served by the McLoud Public Library, which is part of the Pioneer Library System. The State Librarian of California from 1951 to 1972, Carma Leigh, was born near McLoud.

== Culture ==
=== Blackberry festival ===
As the "Blackberry Capital of the World", McLoud is home to the annual Blackberry Festival sponsored by the McLoud Chamber of Commerce. The festival began in the 1940s as a celebration of the end of the blackberry harvest. Although there is no longer large scale commercial blackberry farming in McLoud, blackberries still grow wild in the area. Another local favorite is the Austin poker tournament held in conjunction with the festival.

The festival is held the first weekend in July at venues throughout the community. The festivities now include a parade, carnival, car show, poker run, baking contest, and pageant. Fireworks and music are also a major part of the activities for the weekend.
