= Oklahoma City Crosstown Expressway =

Oklahoma City Crosstown Expressway
- I-40 Crosstown

Route information
- Maintained by ODOT
- Length: 5 mi (8.0 km)
- Existed: 1966–February 19, 2012
- NHS: Entire route

Major junctions
- West end: I-40 / US 270 in Oklahoma City
- East end: I-35 / I-40 / I-235 / US 62 / US 77 / US 270 in Oklahoma City

Location
- Country: United States
- State: Oklahoma

Highway system
- Interstate Highway System; Main; Auxiliary; Suffixed; Business; Future; Oklahoma State Highway System; Interstate; US; State; Turnpikes

The Oklahoma City Crosstown Expressway a.k.a. I-40 Crosstown was roughly five-mile (8.0 km) stretch of Interstate 40 (I-40) just south of Downtown Oklahoma City running along the Oklahoma River (formerly North Canadian River) from I-40 / US 270 to I-35 / I-40 / I-235 / US 62 / US 77 / US 270. Prior to 2012, the I-40 Crosstown was an elevated stretch that bisected downtown. The Oklahoma City Crosstown was the de facto east–west artery through Oklahoma City, serving as an unofficial dividing line between north and south Oklahoma City (the official dividing line for address purposes was Sheridan Avenue). It was maintained by the Oklahoma Department of Transportation (ODOT).

== Context ==
=== Oklahoma City Crosstown Bridge ===
The Oklahoma City Crosstown was the busiest of Oklahoma's many aging bridges. While the Crosstown Expressway was designed to withstand about 76,000 vehicles a day, by 2010 it was used by nearly 120,000 vehicles a day.

The Crosstown was completed in 1966 using an engineering process commonly termed as "fracture critical", a process that has not been used since the 1970s because it does not provide redundancies. According to Brian Windsor, an ODOT structural engineer, without redundant support, the failure of a single beam created the risk of total collapse of that section of bridge. The entire stretch of the original I-40 Crosstown Expressway was elevated, and at some points, the elevation was as much as 50 feet (15.2 m).

According to a 2006 report, Oklahoma led the nation with 6,299 "structurally deficient" bridges. Attention to the Crosstown project increased in August 2007 after the collapse of the I-35W Bridge over the Mississippi River in Minneapolis, Minnesota. At that time, ODOT released a statement indicating that the condition of the Crosstown was "deteriorating", but that it "remained safe."

Concerns about whether the Crosstown Bridge would last until its 2012 replacement date increased on September 23, 2007, when a hole in the Crosstown resulted in closure of all but one lane and created significant traffic delays. Other safety problems of the Crosstown included falling chunks of concrete and a lack of breakdown lanes. In an August 2007 poll sponsored by The Oklahoman, nearly 2/3 of respondents indicated that they were "afraid to drive across the Crosstown bridge in Oklahoma City".

=== Status ===
On January 5, 2012, eastbound traffic was transferred to the new alignment of the I-40 Crosstown Expressway with westbound following on February 19. The original I-40 Crosstown Expressway bridge was removed.

On August 19, 2019, Oklahoma City Boulevard was officially opened.

== Relocation Project ==
=== History ===
In May 2002, federal funding was secured to finance replacement of the Oklahoma City Crosstown. Rather than replace the existing structure, a new stretch of I-40 would be constructed about five blocks south of the then current location. Initial estimates of the Crosstown replacement project were that the project would take 8 years with a completion date of 2010, and would cost $360 million. The most recent revision to this estimate was released in July 2007, and indicated that the project will be completed in 2012 and will cost $557 million. The ground-level boulevard to replace the current Crosstown bridges is no longer included in the cost estimates. The new Crosstown will have ten lanes for traffic traveling at 60 miles per hour (97 km/h). It is being designed to carry 170,000 vehicles per day, and will have shoulders for disabled vehicles. Over 95% of current traffic on the Crosstown is through traffic, not transferring to or from downtown streets.

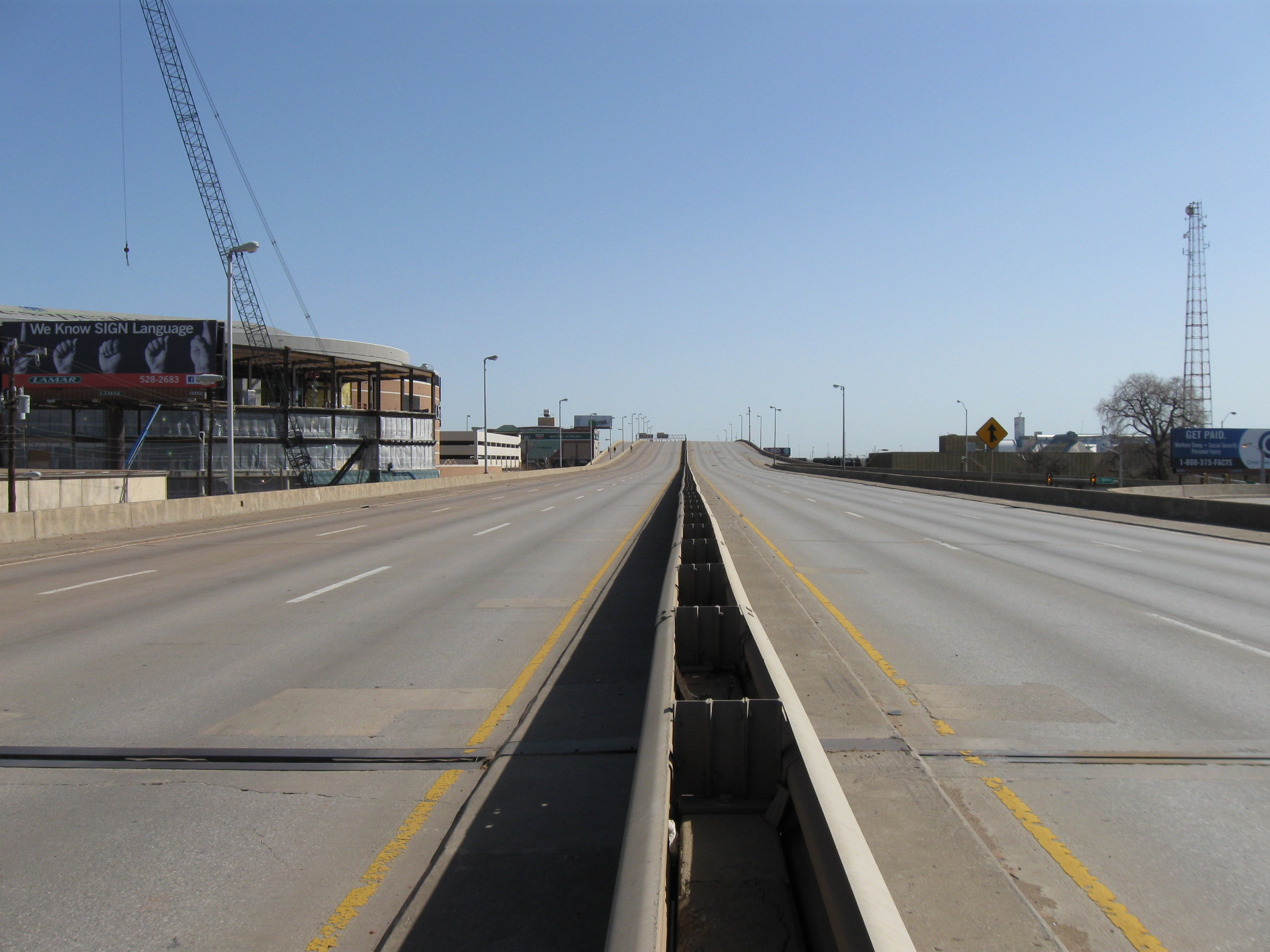
The old I-40 Crosstown Expressway bridge in downtown Oklahoma City, Oklahoma, as shot from the median, looking eastbound as seen in 2012. The Oklahoma Department of Transportation hosted a public event on the bridge after traffic had been shifted to its replacement.

More recently, the Crosstown project has come under serious controversy. In an era of fluctuating energy prices and changing circumstances, several citizen's groups are challenging the project. Devon Energy announced in March 2008 it would construct a one million square foot office tower in the center of a revitalized downtown to house between 2,000 and 3,000 of its employees. The Devon location will be ten blocks away from the interstate instead of four blocks, resulting in increased congestion on slower downtown streets during rush hour. Under current construction plans, part of Oklahoma City's Union Station railyard would be sacrificed to make space for the freeway, leading to concerns that this would disable the station from use in future light rail, commuter rail or traffic circulation use. An unprecedented ruling in June 2008 by the Federal Surface Transportation Board held that the BNSF railway made fraudulent representations in their request for abandonment of the freight line that would enable the Crosstown, and denied the abandonment. However, in May 2009 the final decision from the STB reversed the earlier ruling, allowing the ODOT to move ahead with their plans.

ODOT had not sought to redirect semitrailers off the former I-40 stretch of deteriorating overpasses. ODOT Director Gary Ridley said the then current I-40 will "absolutely" survive through 2012, the completion date for the realignment, adding, "If we felt there was anything wrong that would cause us concern, we would close it, and we wouldn't think twice about it." However, in a filing with STB, Ridley urged a quick ruling because "new serious issues including cracks in fracture critical members are constantly being discovered and repaired. The condition and obsolescence of the existing bridges constitutes serious concern for the Department." Other highway connections, running east and west, include I-240 and I-44.

=== Timeline ===
1. January 1996: Citizens advisory committee formed.
2. December 1998: ODOT chooses route for new Crosstown
3. February 7, 2001: Formal public hearing held at the Myriad Convention Center.
4. May 12, 2002: ODOT announces federal funding secured.
5. May 13, 2002: Kick off meeting/groundbreaking.
6. March 20, 2003: Acquisition of all occupied residential property completed.
7. 2004: Railroad and utility relocations were to have begun.
8. August 1, 2005: Construction contract awarded to Muskogee Bridge Company.
9. 2007: Construction was to have been completed on new alignment for I-40.
10. January 2007: Surface Transportation Board approves railway abandonment application of Burlington Northern/Santa Fe (BNSF).
11. July 2007: The first section of the new Crosstown Expressway: Three sections, including two 80-foot (24 m) long bridges and one railroad bridge were completed.
12. May 2007: The State Convention of the Oklahoma Democratic Party adopted a resolution calling for a moratorium on construction and the appointment of a special commission to "consider alternatives that would preserve the Union railyard before any more public money is spent on this project."
13. August 1, 2007: Collapse of I-35W bridge in Minnesota
14. September 20, 2007: Hole in Crosstown closed all but one lane of traffic and created significant traffic delays.
15. November 29, 2007: Hole in Crosstown closed all but one lane of westbound traffic east of Robinson Avenue.
16. March 14, 2008: Hole in Crosstown closed all but one lane of westbound traffic.
17. March 28, 2008: Hole in Crosstown closed all but one lane of westbound traffic from the I-235 junction to Classen Boulevard.
18. June 5, 2008: Surface Transportation Board reopens railway abandonment case and declares it void due to false statements made by BNSF.
19. July 15, 2008: BNSF files petition with STB for relocation (instead of abandonment) of existing railway.
20. September 20, 2008: ODOT Director Gary Ridley announced no funds are available to tear down the existing Crosstown Expressway as originally planned. He estimated the cost of demolition and removal to be an additional $100 million.
21. September 24, 2008: The City Council of Norman, Oklahoma, adopted a resolution requesting the Governor to appoint a commission to consider alternatives to removal of the Union Station railyard.
22. October 6, 2008: The City Commission and the Economic Development of Authority of Shawnee, Oklahoma, adopted resolutions requesting Governor Brad Henry, a native of Shawnee, to appoint a commission to consider alternatives to removal of the Union Station railyard. In addition to Norman, the cities of Chickasha and El Reno have also passed similar resolutions.
23. October 20, 2008: The Shawnee City Commission by a 5–2 vote denied a request by ODOT officials to reconsider the resolution.
24. April 7, 2009: Another hole and a loose expansion joint in Crosstown closed all but one lane of westbound traffic between the I-235 junction and Classen Boulevard
25. January 5, 2012: Eastbound lanes were transferred to the new alignment.
26. February 17, 2012: Completion date for new Crosstown Expressway

=== Neighborhood displacement ===
Under the original Environmental Impact Statement, residents of two neighborhoods were to be displaced by construction of the new Crosstown Expressway. Construction resulted in the demolition of 165 properties in the Walnut Grove and Riverside neighborhoods. The realignment will now directly result in reconstruction of 590 acres (2.4 km^{2}) in Phase I and an additional 785 acres (3.18 km^{2}) in Phase II, for a total of 1,375 acres (5.56 km^{2}) in the core of Oklahoma City.

== Future land use (Core To Shore) ==
After the completion of the new I-40 Crosstown, the existing bridge was demolished. While ODOT is responsible for the relocation of the I-40 Crosstown and the subsequent demolition of the existing structure, the city of Oklahoma City will take the lead in determining the future use of the land currently occupied by the existing crosstown. On June 20, 2006, the Oklahoma City Council announced a $387,000 contract for professional consulting services with the URS Corporation "to recommend specific actions to facilitate redevelopment within the area impacted by the relocation of the downtown section of I-40, Reno Avenue, new I-40 alignment, Western Avenue and I-35/I-235"

On October 5, 2006, Oklahoma City Mayor Mick Cornett introduced the 'Core to Shore' project team which has the task of "planning and developing the area south of downtown and north of the Oklahoma River (formerly North Canadian River) where Interstate 40 currently runs." This team consists of community leaders as well as representatives from URS Corp.

== Exit List ==
The entire route was in Oklahoma City, Oklahoma County.

mi	km	Exit	Destinations	Notes
			I-40 west / US 270 west to I-44 / SH-3 – Amarillo, Lawton, Tulsa	Continuation beyond western terminus
		147C	May Avenue – Fair Park	Westbound exit and eastbound entrance
		148A	Agnew Avenue / Villa Avenue	
		148B	Penn Avenue	Eastbound exit and westbound entrance; full name "Pennsylvania"
		148C	Virginia Avenue	Westbound exit and eastbound entrance
		149A	Western Avenue	Served Reno Avenue and Sheridan Avenue
		149B	Classen Boulevard	Westbound exit and eastbound entrance
		150A	Walker Avenue – Downtown Oklahoma City	Eastbound exit and westbound entrance
		150B	Harvey Avenue	Eastbound exit only
		150C	Robinson Avenue	Westbound exit only
		151A	Lincoln Boulevard	Eastbound exit only; former SH-107
		151B	I-35 south / US 62 west / US 77 south – Dallas	No exit number westbound
		151C	I-235 north / US 77 north – Edmond, State Capitol, Oklahoma Health Center	Signed as I-35 exit 126 westbound
			I-35 north / I-40 east / US 62 east / US 270 east to I-44 – Wichita, Fort Smith, Tulsa	Continuation beyond eastern terminus
1.000 mi = 1.609 km; 1.000 km = 0.621 mi: Closed/former
