= Interstate 40 =

Interstate Highway across south-central US

Interstate 40

Route information
- Length: 2,556.61 mi (4,114.46 km)
- Existed: August 14, 1957–present
- NHS: Entire route

Major junctions
- West end: I-15 in Barstow, CA
- I-17 in Flagstaff, AZ; I-25 in Albuquerque, NM; I-27 in Amarillo, TX; I-35 in Oklahoma City, OK; I-30 in North Little Rock, AR; I-55 in West Memphis, AR; I-24 / I-65 in Nashville, TN; I-75 from Farragut to Knoxville, TN; I-85 from Greensboro to Hillsborough, NC; I-95 in Benson, NC
- East end: US 117 in Wilmington, NC

Location
- Country: United States
- States: California, Arizona, New Mexico, Texas, Oklahoma, Arkansas, Tennessee, North Carolina

Highway system
- Interstate Highway System; Main; Auxiliary; Suffixed; Business; Future

Interstate 40 (I-40) is a major east–west transcontinental Interstate Highway in the southeastern and southwestern portions of the United States. From west to east, it passes through California, Arizona, New Mexico, Texas, Oklahoma, Arkansas, Tennessee, and North Carolina. At a length of 2,556.61 miles (4,114.46 km), it is the third-longest Interstate Highway in the country, after I-90 and I-80.

Its western terminus is at I-15 in Barstow, California, while its eastern terminus is at a concurrency with U.S. Route 117 (US 117) and North Carolina Highway 132 (NC 132) in Wilmington, North Carolina. Major cities served by the Interstate include Flagstaff, Arizona; Albuquerque, New Mexico; Amarillo, Texas; Oklahoma City, Oklahoma; Fort Smith and Little Rock in Arkansas; Memphis, Nashville, and Knoxville in Tennessee; and Asheville, Winston-Salem, Greensboro, Durham, Raleigh, and Wilmington in North Carolina.

I-40 begins in the Mojave Desert in California, and then proceeds through the Colorado Plateau in Arizona and the southern tip of the Rocky Mountains in New Mexico. It then traverses the Great Plains through the Texas Panhandle and Oklahoma, and passes south of the Ozarks in Arkansas. The freeway crosses the Appalachian Mountains in Tennessee and North Carolina, before terminating in the Atlantic Coastal Plain near the Atlantic Ocean.

Much of the western part of I-40, from Barstow to Oklahoma City, parallels or overlays the historic U.S. Route 66. East of Oklahoma City, the route generally parallels US 64 and US 70. I-40 was established by the Federal-Aid Highway Act of 1956, and the numbering was subsequently approved on August 14, 1957, along with most of the rest of the system. The eastern terminus was initially planned to be located at I-85 in Greensboro, but the Federal Highway Administration later approved extending the route to its current eastern terminus in Wilmington. As a result, this was the last segment of I-40 to be completed upon its dedication in 1990.

== Route description ==
Lengths
	mi	km
CA	154.61	248.82
AZ	359.48	578.53
NM	373.51	601.11
TX	177.10	285.01
OK	331.73	533.87
AR	284.69	458.16
TN	455.28	732.70
NC	420.21	676.26
Total	2,556.61	4,114.46

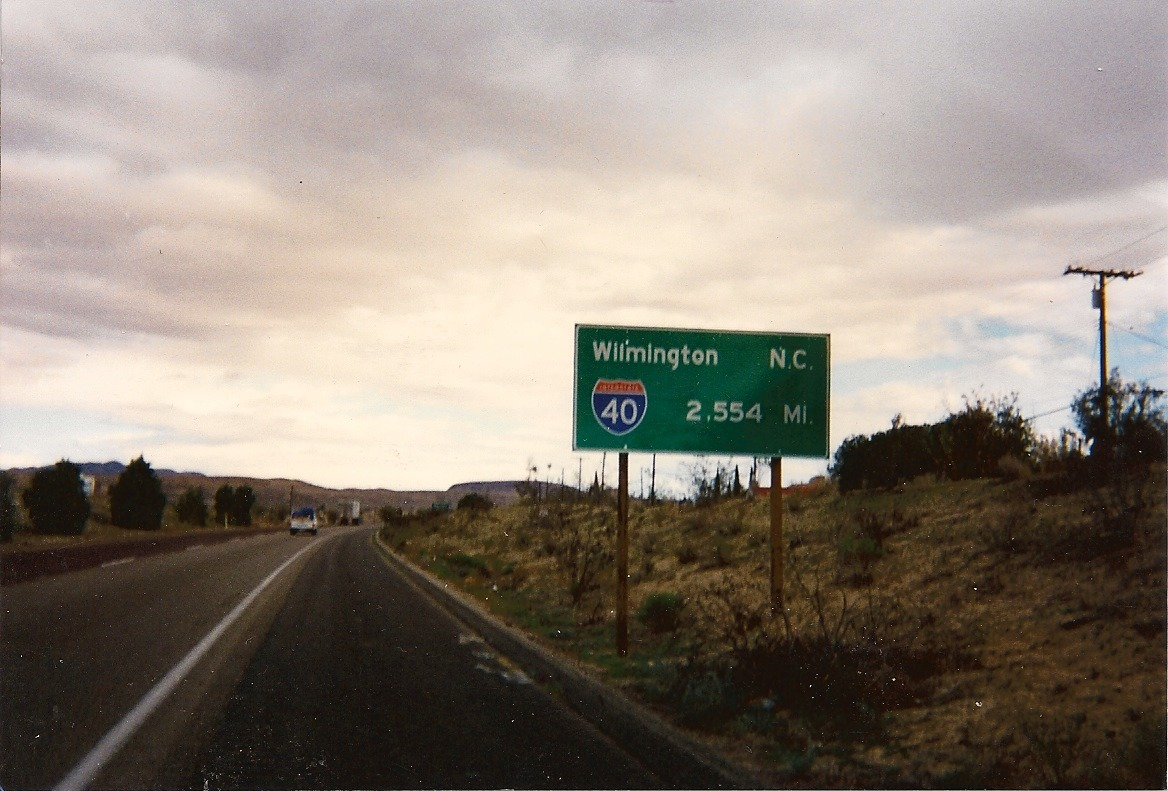
A sign at the start of I-40 in Barstow, California, showing the distance to the freeway's eastern terminus in Wilmington, North Carolina. This sign has been stolen several times.

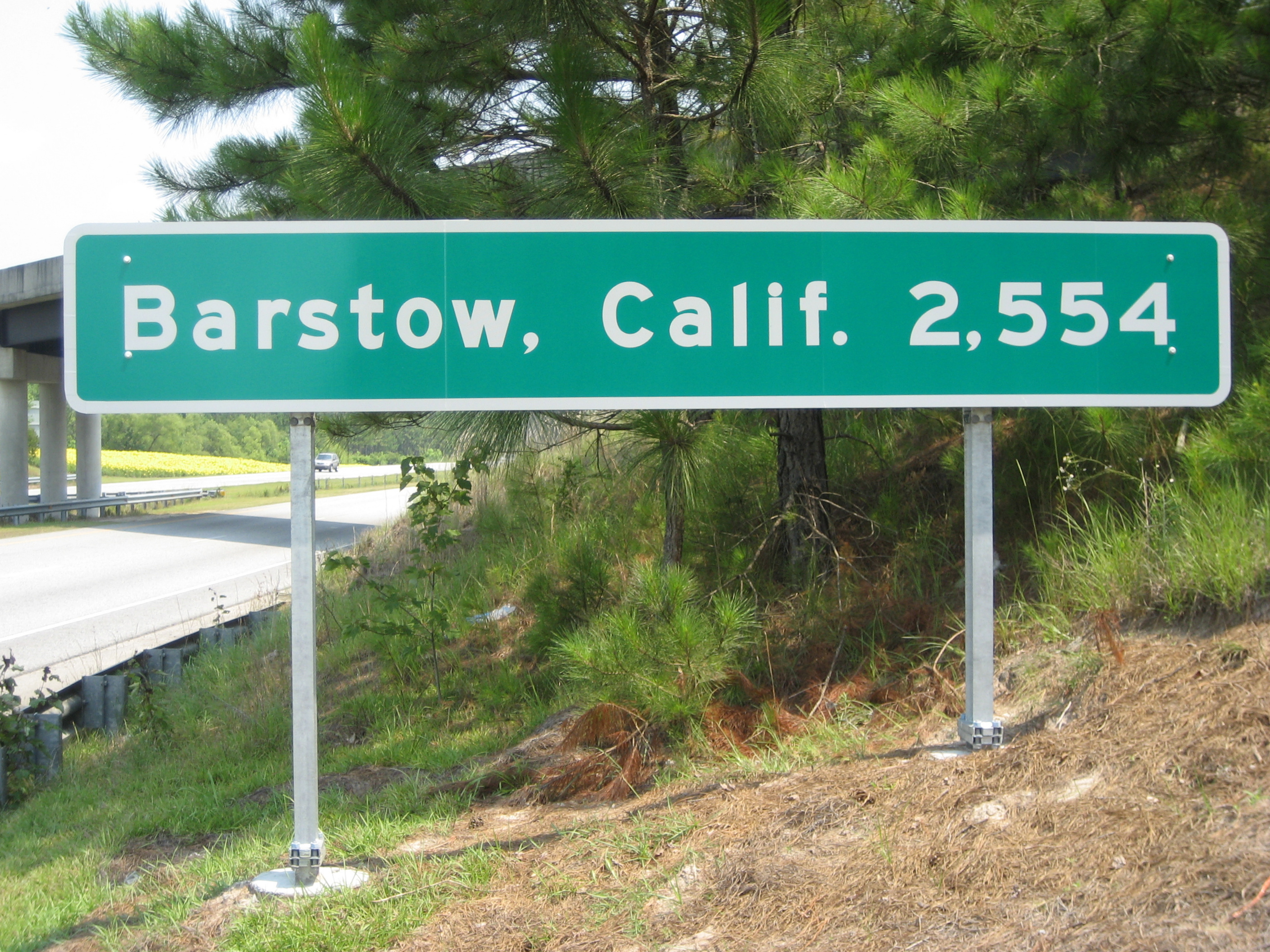
A sign displaying the distance to Barstow near Wilmington. This sign is no longer posted by NCDOT due to the frequency of its theft.

I-40 is the third-longest freeway in the United States, spanning 2,556.61 miles (4,114.46 km) across the southern half of the country. The longest stretch of the highway is in Tennessee, and the shortest is in California. The busiest stretch of I-40 is in Knoxville, where it runs concurrently with I-75, which has an annual average daily traffic volume of more than 210,000 vehicles. The lowest traffic volumes are found on rural stretches in New Mexico, Texas, and Oklahoma, where the freeway carries fewer than 15,000 vehicles per day.

=== California ===
I-40 in California crosses through the lightly populated northern part of the Inland Empire region of the state. Its western end is in Barstow, California. Known as the Needles Freeway, it heads east from Barstow across the Mojave Desert in San Bernardino County to Needles, before it crosses the Colorado River into Arizona southwest of Kingman. I-40 covers 155 miles (249 km) in California. Some signs show the control city for I-40 westbound to be Los Angeles, where drivers would follow I-15 south from its western terminus in Barstow. The highway is four lanes for the entirety of its length in the state.

A sign in California showing the distance to Wilmington, North Carolina, has been stolen several times.

=== Arizona ===
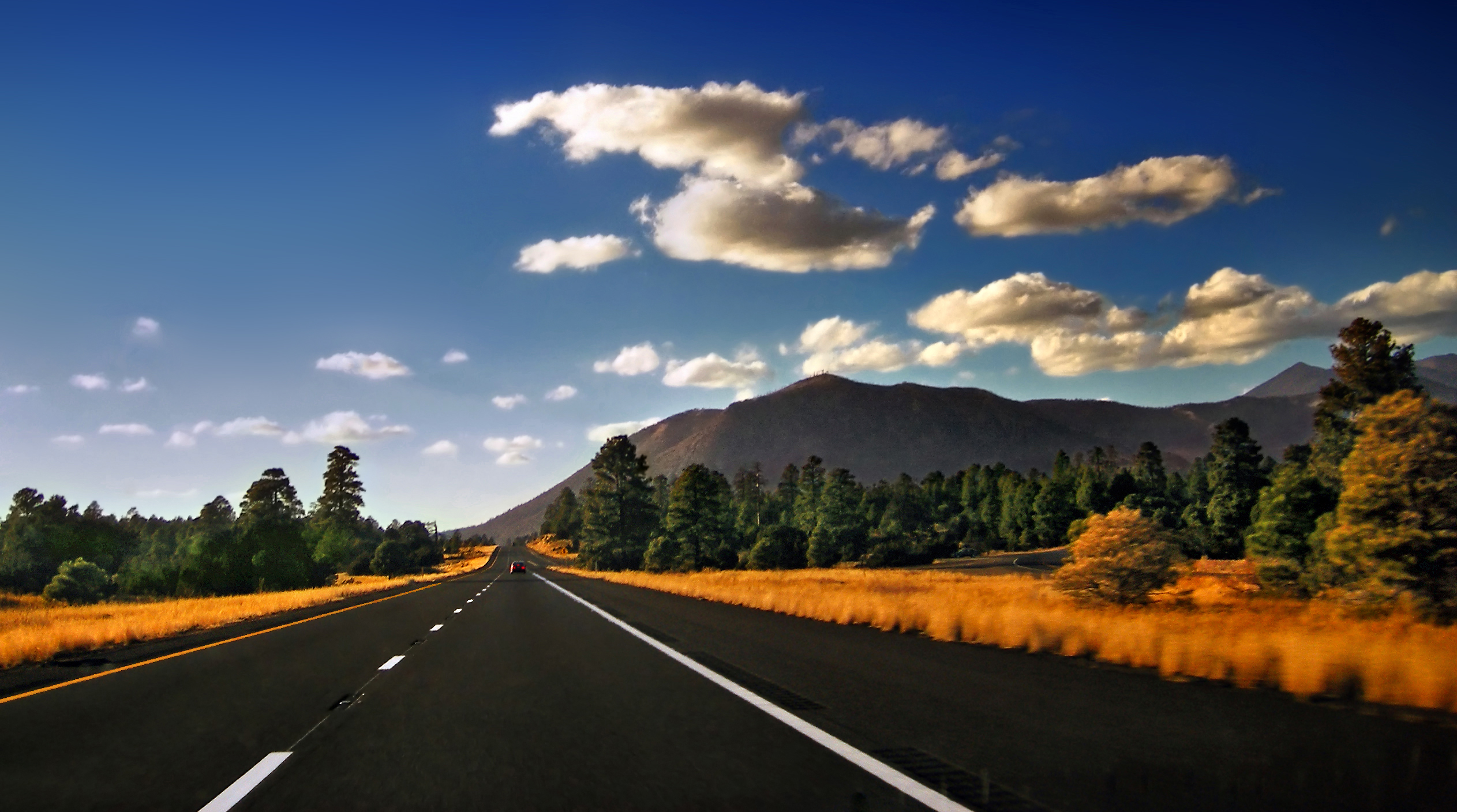
I-40 westbound heading toward Flagstaff

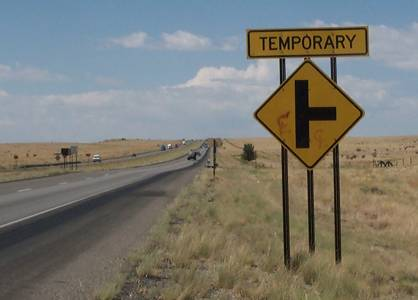
An at-grade intersection on I-40 in Texas, 2003

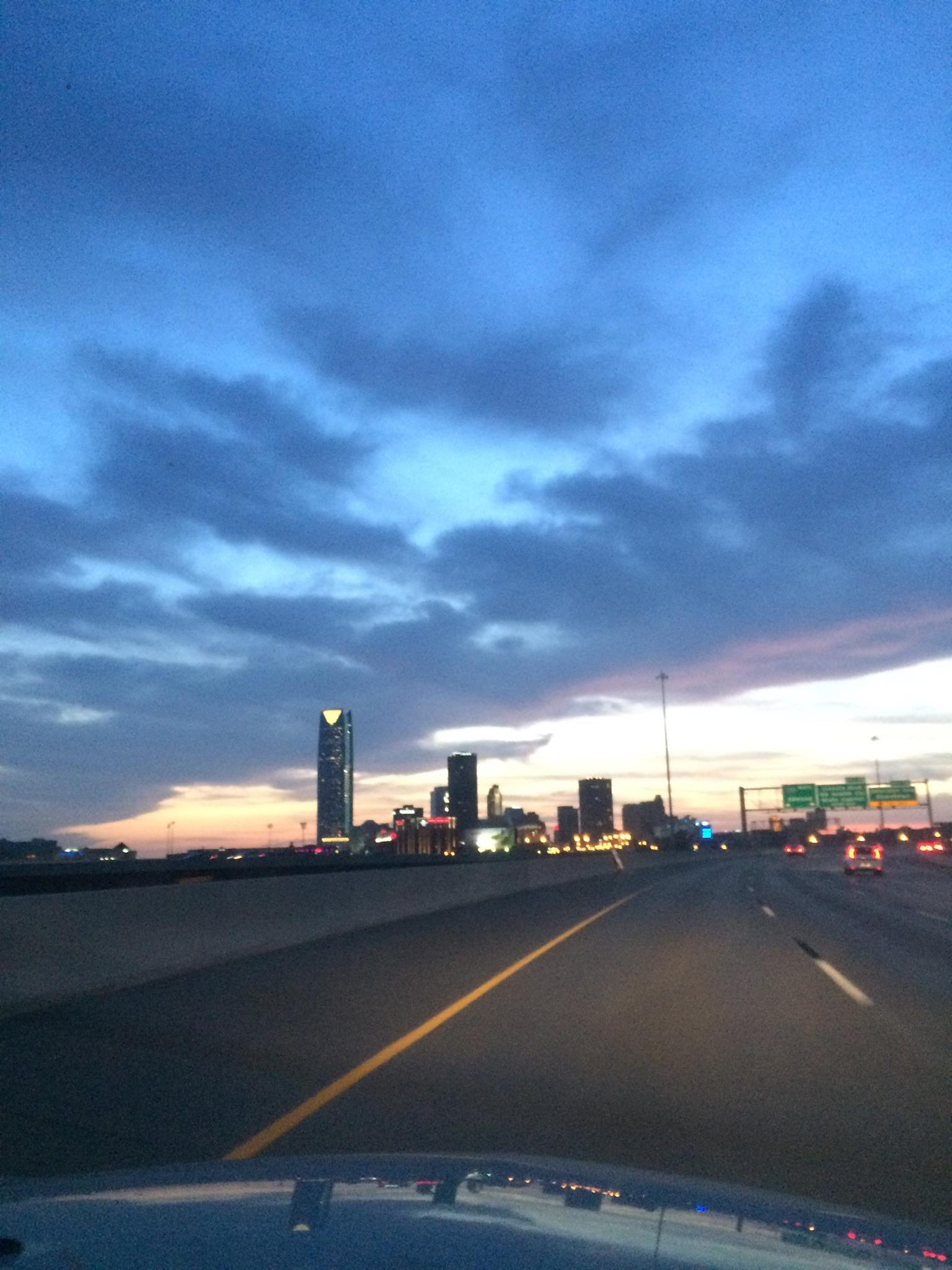
I-40 in Downtown Oklahoma City

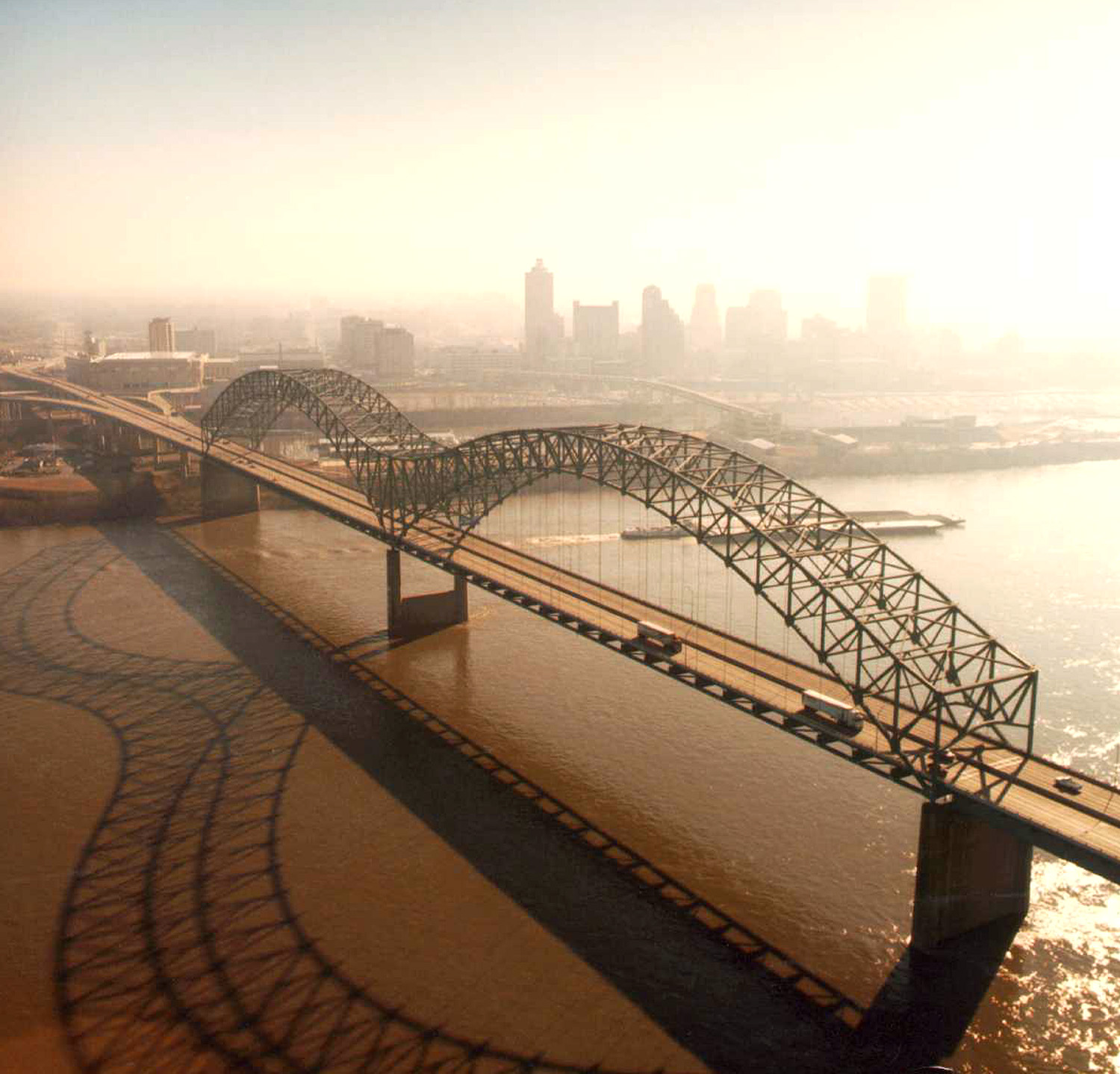
The Hernando de Soto Bridge, where I-40 crosses the Mississippi River into Memphis

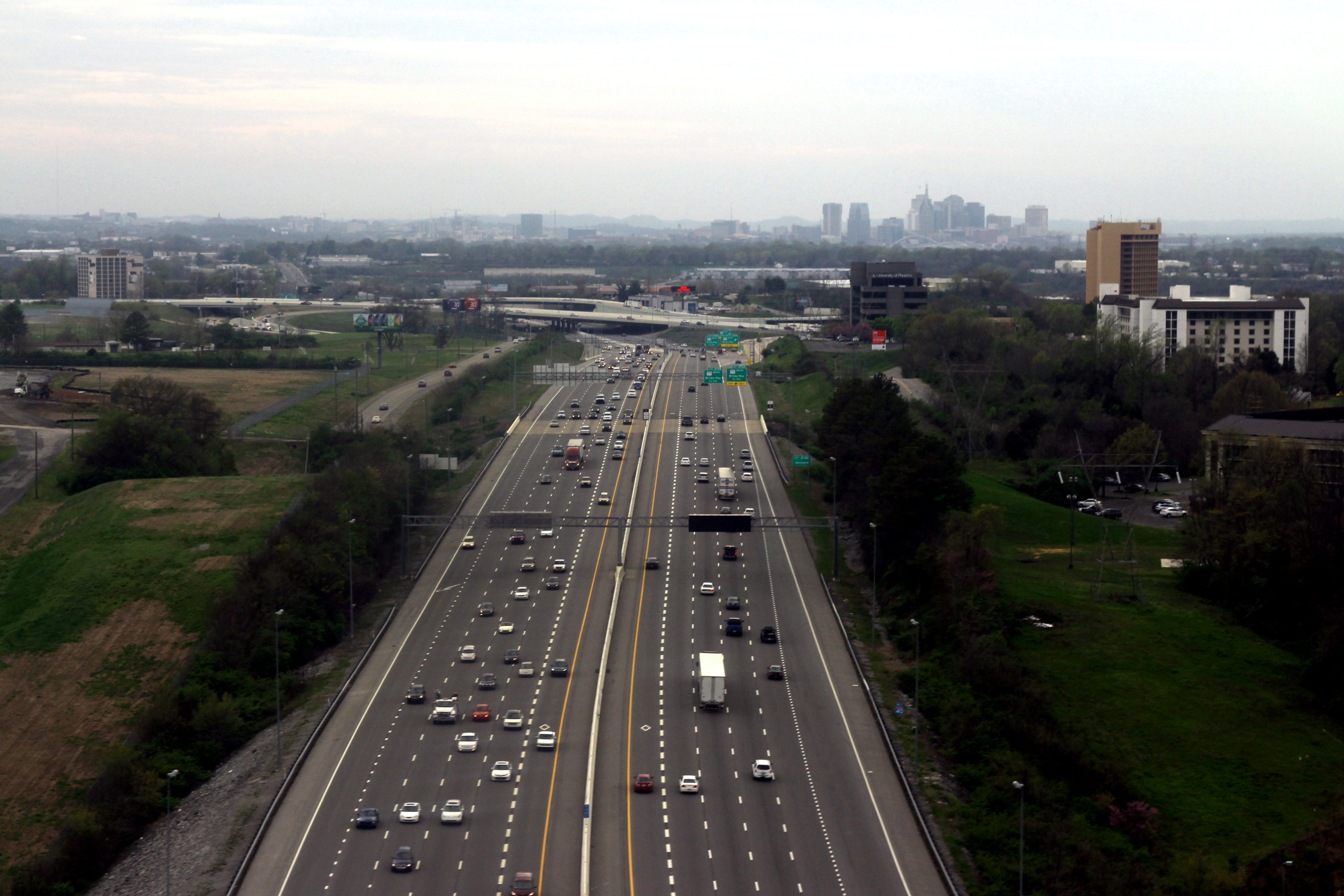
I-40 in Nashville

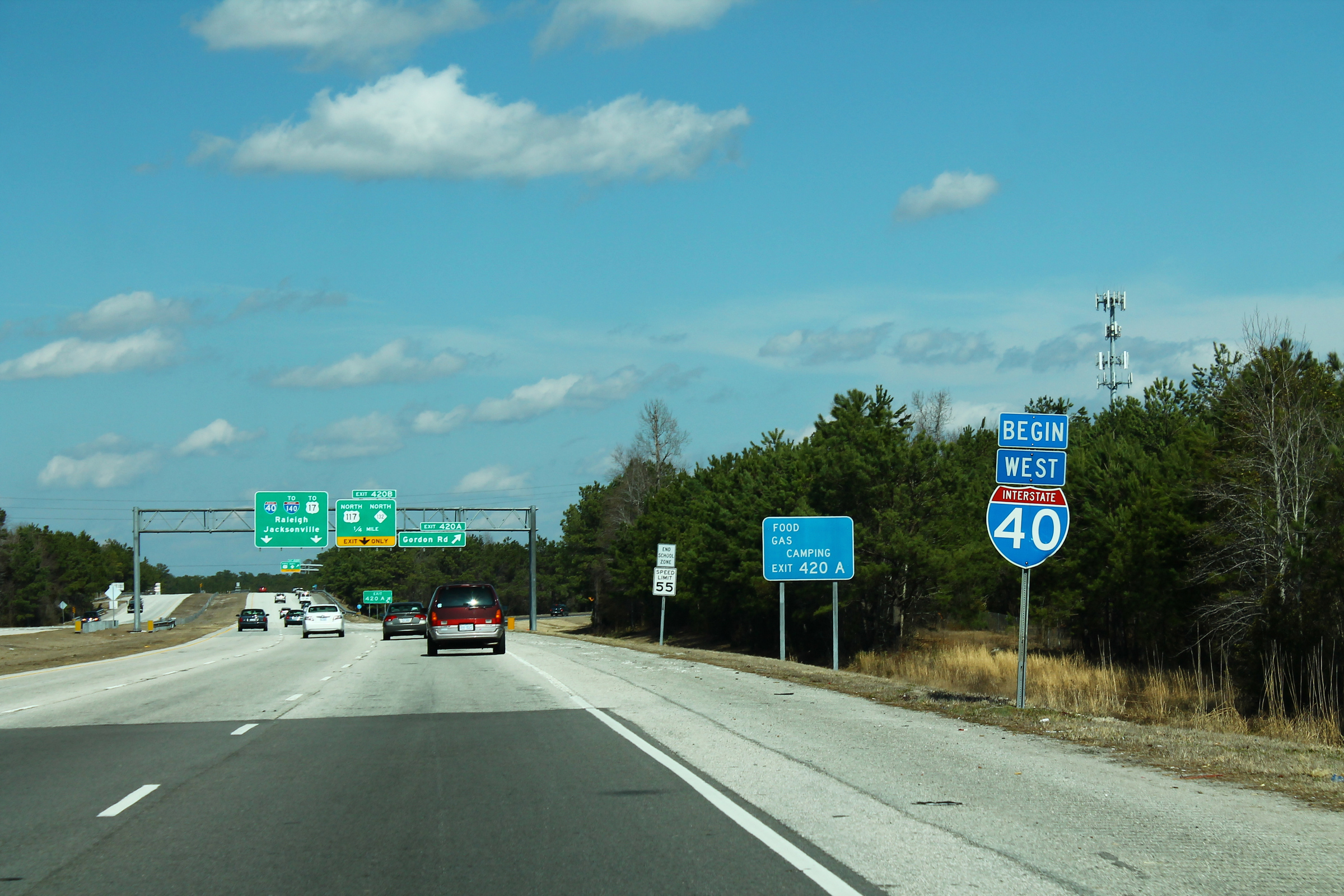
The beginning of I-40 west, near Wilmington

I-40 is a main route to the South Rim of the Grand Canyon, with the exits leading into Grand Canyon National Park in Williams and Flagstaff. I-40 covers 359 miles (578 km) in Arizona. Just west of exit 190, west of Flagstaff, is its highest elevation along I-40, as the road crosses just over 7,330 feet (2,230 m) at the Arizona Divide near milepost 190. I-40 also passes through the Navajo Nation, the largest Indian reservation in the US. Like California's segment, the highway is four lanes for the entirety of its length in the state.

=== New Mexico ===
I-40 covers 374 miles (602 km) in New Mexico. As in other states it parallels or overrides the post 1937 Route 66 route through the state. Notable cities along I-40 include Gallup, Grants, Albuquerque, Santa Rosa, and Tucumcari. I-40 also travels through several Indian reservations in the western half of the state. It reaches its highest point in the state of 7,275 feet (2,217 m) at the Continental Divide (Campbell Pass) in western New Mexico between Gallup and Grants. The last place that I-40 tops 7,000 feet (2,100 m) is at the head of Tijeras Canyon east of Albuquerque at approximately 7,040 feet (2,150 m).

Arizona, New Mexico, Texas, Oklahoma, and Arkansas are the five states where I-40 has a speed limit of 75 mph (121 km/h) instead of the 70 mph (110 km/h) limit in California, Tennessee, and North Carolina.

=== Texas ===
In the west Texas panhandle area, there are several ranch roads connected directly to the Interstate. The only major city in Texas that is directly served by I-40 is Amarillo, which connects with I-27 that runs south toward Lubbock. I-40 also connects to US 287 that runs southeast to Dallas–Fort Worth and US 87/US 287 north to Dumas and then on into Oklahoma. I-40 has only one welcome center in the state, which is located in Amarillo at the exit for Rick Husband Amarillo International Airport, serving both sides of the Interstate.

=== Oklahoma ===
I-40 goes through the heart of the state, passing through many Oklahoma cities and towns, including Erick, Sayre, Elk City, Clinton, Weatherford, El Reno, Yukon, Oklahoma City, Del City, Midwest City, Shawnee, Okemah, Henryetta, Checotah, Sallisaw, and Roland. I-40 covers 331 miles (533 km) in Oklahoma.

In Downtown Oklahoma City, I-40 was rerouted one mile (1.6 km) south of its former alignment and a 10-lane (five in each direction) facility replaced the former I-40 Crosstown Bridge; the former I-40 alignment will be replaced with an urban boulevard currently designated as Oklahoma City Boulevard.

=== Arkansas ===
I-40 enters the west-central part of the state and runs for 285 miles (459 km) in Arkansas. The route passes through Van Buren, where it intersects the southbound I-540/US 71 to Fort Smith. The route continues east to Alma to intersect I-49 north to Fayetteville, Arkansas. Running through the Ozark Mountains, I-40 serves Ozark, Clarksville, Russellville, Morrilton, and Conway. The route turns south after Conway and enters North Little Rock, which brings high volume interchanges with I-430, I-30/US 65/US 67/US 167, and I-440. The Interstate continues east through Lonoke, Brinkley, and West Memphis on the eastside. I-40 briefly overlaps I-55 in West Memphis before it crosses the Mississippi River on the Hernando de Soto Bridge and enters Memphis, Tennessee.

=== Tennessee ===
The state of Tennessee has the longest segment of I-40 at 455 miles (732 km). The Interstate goes through all of the three Grand Divisions of Tennessee and its three largest cities: Memphis, Nashville, and Knoxville. Jackson, Lebanon, Cookeville, Crossville, and Newport are other notable cities through which I-40 passes. Before leaving the state, I-40 enters the Great Smoky Mountains toward North Carolina.

The section of I-40 which runs between Memphis and Nashville is often referred to as the Music Highway. During reconstruction, a short section of I-40 through downtown Knoxville near the central Malfunction Junction was completely closed to traffic from May 1, 2008, and not reopened until June 12, 2009, with all traffic redirected via I-640, the northern bypass route. The redesigned section now has additional lanes in each direction, is less congested, and has fewer accidents.

=== North Carolina ===
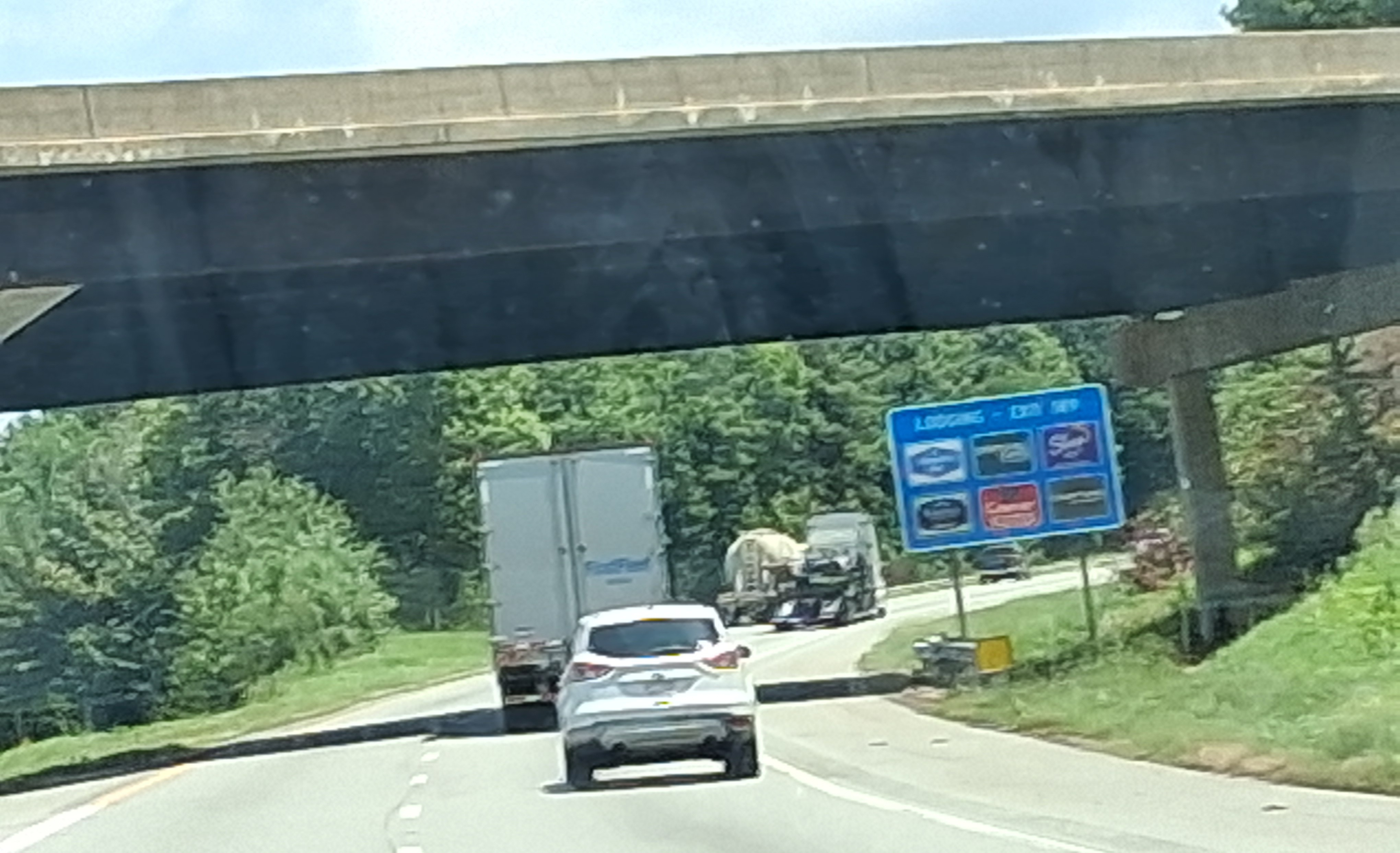
Interstate 40 in Winston-Salem

In North Carolina, I-40 travels 420 miles (680 km). It enters the state as a winding mountain freeway through the Great Smoky Mountains, which frequently closes due to landslides and weather-related problems. It enters the state on a mostly north–south alignment, turning to a more east–west alignment upon merging with US 74 at the eastern terminus of the Great Smoky Mountains Expressway. From there, the highway traverses inside Asheville, Hickory, and Statesville before reaching the Piedmont Triad. I-40 traverses into Winston-Salem and Greensboro, before merging with I-85 in the eastern outskirts of Greensboro. I-40 and I-85 run concurrent, before diverging from each other in the western outskirts of the Research Triangle, where I-85 heads northeast into central Durham, while I-40 heads southeast into Raleigh. From the Triangle to its eastern terminus in Wilmington, it once again traverses in the mostly north–south alignment.

A standard distance sign existed near the start of the westbound section of I-40 in Wilmington that indicated the distance to Barstow, California, as 2,554 miles (4,110 km). In 2009, NCDOT said it would not be replaced after frequent thefts.

== History ==
=== Predecessors and planning ===
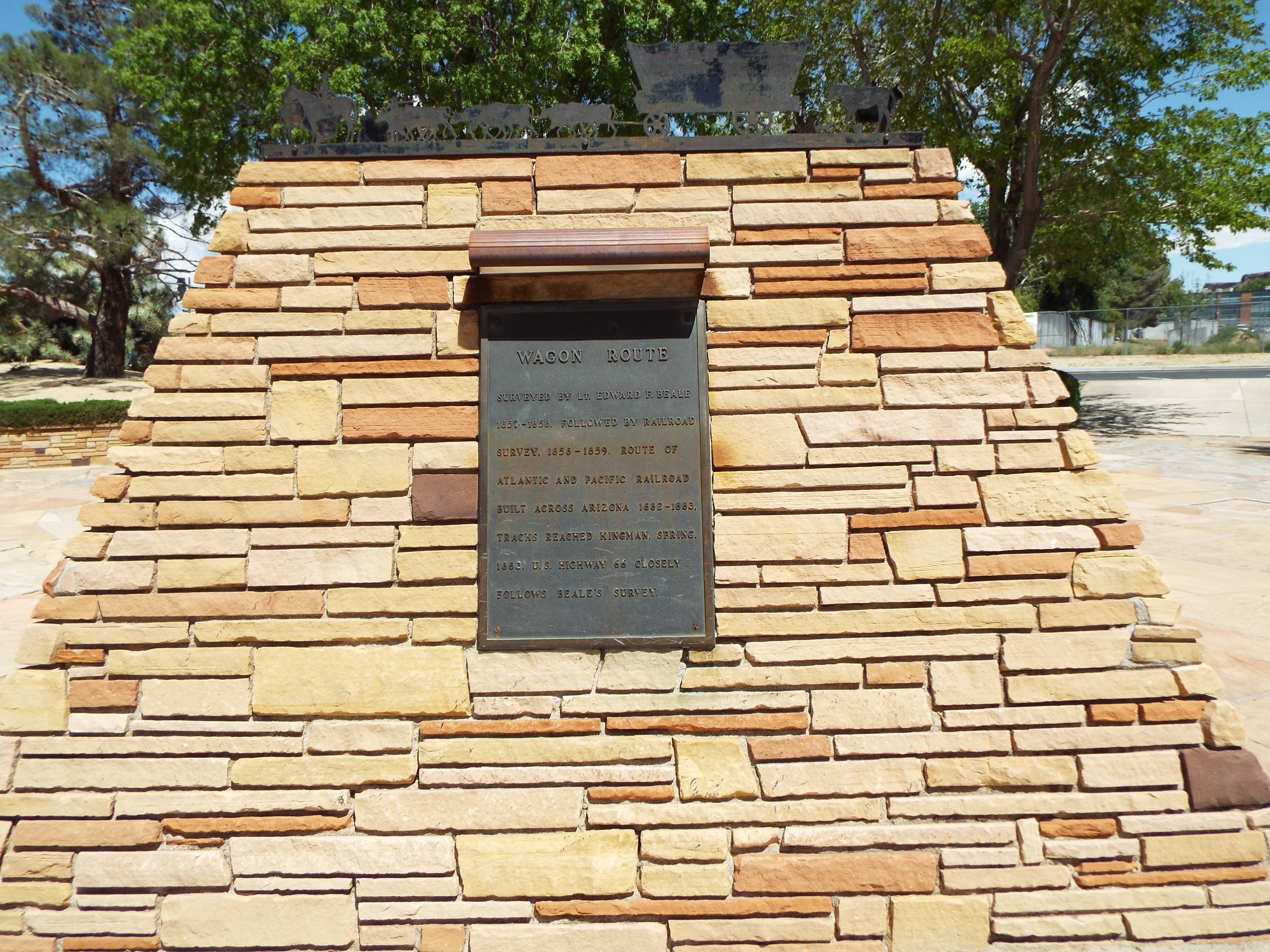
A monument to Beale's Wagon Road in Kingman, Arizona

During the colonial and westward expansion eras, a number of Native American trails existed within the vicinity of what is now Interstate 40. In 1857, an expedition led by Lt. Edward Fitzgerald Beale was tasked with establishing a trade route along the 35th parallel north from Fort Smith, Arkansas, to Los Angeles, California. This route, which became known as Beale's Wagon Road, was constructed by a team of about 100 men and 22 camels led by Beale. Completed in 1859, it is generally considered the first federal highway in the Southwestern United States.

In the early 20th century, a number of auto trails were established by private organizations to aid motorists in traveling between major cities. Among these was the National Old Trails Road, which roughly followed the western part of present-day I-40 to Albuquerque, and the Lee Highway, which followed much of the eastern portion of the route. When the state governments established the United States Numbered Highway System in 1926, two of these most important highways, US 66 and US 70 were established within the present-day I-40 corridor.

US 66, which followed the route from its western terminus to Oklahoma City, became arguably the most famous highway in the United States and has been recognized multiple times in popular culture. US 70, which roughly follows the remainder of the Interstate, was also one of the most important highways for east−west travelers, and was considered part of the "Broadway of America" highway between California and New York.

An east−west trans-continental freeway to serve the south-central United States was proposed in multiple plans throughout the 1930s and 1940s for what later became the Interstate Highway System. The general alignment for the highway that became I-40 was included in a plan released on August 2, 1947, by the Public Roads Administration of the now-defunct Federal Works Agency. The Interstate was officially authorized between Barstow and Greensboro by the Federal-Aid Highway Act of 1956, which created the Interstate Highway System. The numbering was subsequently approved by the American Association of State Highway Officials (AASHO) on August 14, 1957, along with most of the system.

In 1957, the California Department of Highways, the predecessor agency to the California Department of Transportation (Caltrans), proposed that the route be renumbered to I-30 instead because of the already existing US 40 in the state. This route was decommissioned in the state in 1964 as a part of a major revamping of California's overall highway numbering system. The California state government also submitted State Route 58 (SR 58) between Barstow and Bakersfield for I-40 extension potential in 1956 and 1968, but both of these requests were rejected.

From 1963 to 1966, the US government considered a plan, part of Project Plowshare, to use atomic bombs to excavate a path for I-40 through California. The project was canceled largely due to the cost of developing the explosives and due to the unavailability of a "clean bomb".

=== Construction ===
The first sections of I-40 reused freeways that had been constructed prior to the Interstate Highway System or were under construction at the time of the authorization of the system. The first stretch in Tennessee reused a short freeway in Knoxville called the Magnolia Avenue Expressway, which was opened in two segments in 1952 and 1955. The first stretches in North Carolina were a short controlled-access section of US 421 in Winston-Salem, and from Kernersville, constructed between 1955 and 1958. By 1957, most states had begun construction on the first sections of I-40. The first construction project specifically for I-40 in 1958 was a section along the Pigeon River in Western North Carolina. The stretch between Memphis and Nashville, completed on July 24, 1966, was the first major stretch of interstate highway completed in Tennessee.

On June 30, 1972, the final stretch of I-40 entirely within Arkansas, located between Clarksville and Ozark was opened; the last section to open in the state was the Hernando de Soto Bridge, which opened on August 2, 1973. The last segment in California to be completed was a short stretch in Needles, opened on August 13, 1973. The last original planned stretch of the highway in Tennessee, located east of Knoxville, was partially opened on December 20, 1974, and fully opened on September 12, 1975. The last section of I-40 in Oklahoma, a 17-mile (27 km) stretch near Erick near the western end of the state, opened on June 2, 1975.

In 1971, the North Carolina State Highway Commission approved a plan to extend I-40 from Research Triangle Park to I-95, a distance of 41 miles (66 km), at a cost of $75 million (equivalent to $456.08 million in 2025). Most of the highway would be four lanes, though six lanes were likely near Raleigh, where I-40 would extend the Beltline. Several routes were being considered, but, at the time, the most likely route would have ended north of Smithfield. When the last portion of I-40, connecting Wilmington to Raleigh, was dedicated on June 29, 1990, CBS journalist Charles Kuralt stated:

Thanks to the Interstate Highway System, it is now possible to travel from coast to coast without seeing anything.

=== Controversies ===
In Memphis, I-40 was originally planned to pass through the city's Overton Park, a 342-acre (138 ha) public park. Following a public announcement of the routing, a group of community activists opposed to the routing founded an organization called Citizens to Preserve Overton Park in 1957, and collected 10,000 signatures in their support. After Secretary of Transportation John Volpe authorized the state to solicit bids for the construction of the Interstate through the park in 1969, the organization filed a lawsuit, which culminated in the landmark Supreme Court ruling of Citizens to Preserve Overton Park v. Volpe in 1971, which ruled that the state highway department had not adequately explored alternative routes for the interstate. This case is considered to have established the modern process of judicial review of infrastructural projects, and eventually resulted in the state rerouting the alignment of I-40 through the park onto a section of I-240 in 1981.

=== Major projects ===
Between May 1980 and March 1982, a major project was conducted on I-40 in Knoxville that widened the route, eliminated several interchanges, added frontage roads, and reconstructed the congestion-prone cloverleaf interchange with I-75, which had earned the nickname "Malfunction Junction", into a three-level stack interchange. This was conducted as part of a larger $250 million (equivalent to $705 million in 2025) road improvement project in the Knoxville area in preparation for the 1982 World's Fair.

Originally, I-40 was constructed through, what eventually became the center of downtown Winston-Salem, until late 1992. After the new route was completed during the period, I-40 was relocated to the new freeway through the then heavily undeveloped areas south of the congested Downtown. The old highway was then redesignated as Interstate 40 Business (I-40 Bus.), establishing a business route that was actually a freeway for its entire length, a rarity among business routes. Following the reconstruction in one stretch of the old route, the Business Loop was renamed Salem Parkway and was redesignated to be the segment of US 421.

The "Big I" interchange in Albuquerque between I-40 and I-25 was reconstructed between 2000 and 2002 in a project that eliminated left-hand entrance ramps and added lanes. This project was given an honorable mention by the United States Department of Transportation and the FHWA for excellence in urban highway design in 2002.

The Oklahoma City Crosstown Expressway was relocated and replaced with a new wider alignment in two phases between May 2002 and October 2012. The old alignment was replaced with Oklahoma City Boulevard, and at-grade thoroughfare.

In Memphis, the cancellation of the Overton Park stretch of I-240, along with increased traffic volumes and safety hazards, rendered both interchanges with I-240 unable to effectively handle unplanned traffic patterns, thus necessitating their reconstruction. This was accomplished in three phases between January 2001 and December 2016.

A $203.7 million two-phase project dubbed "SmartFix 40" resulted in a complete closure of a short stretch of I-40 through Knoxville between May 1, 2008, and June 12, 2009. This was done in order to accelerate the construction timeline, and during this time, through traffic was required to use I-640. Both phases of the project won an America's Transportation Award from AASHTO in 2008 and 2010, respectively.

=== Geological difficulties ===
Landslides are common in the Pigeon River Gorge section along the Tennessee and North Carolina border. Here, the roadway was cut into the slopes of several steep mountains. Accidents on the winding road are also common especially during bad weather. On October 25, 2009, I-40 was closed at the North Carolina and Tennessee border due to a landslide at milemarker 2.6 just east of the Tennessee state line. All traffic was detoured via I-26 and I-81, and non-heavy-load traffic via US 25 and US 70. The roadway was reopened on April 25, 2010, with some remaining limitations on westbound traffic.

=== Major incidents ===
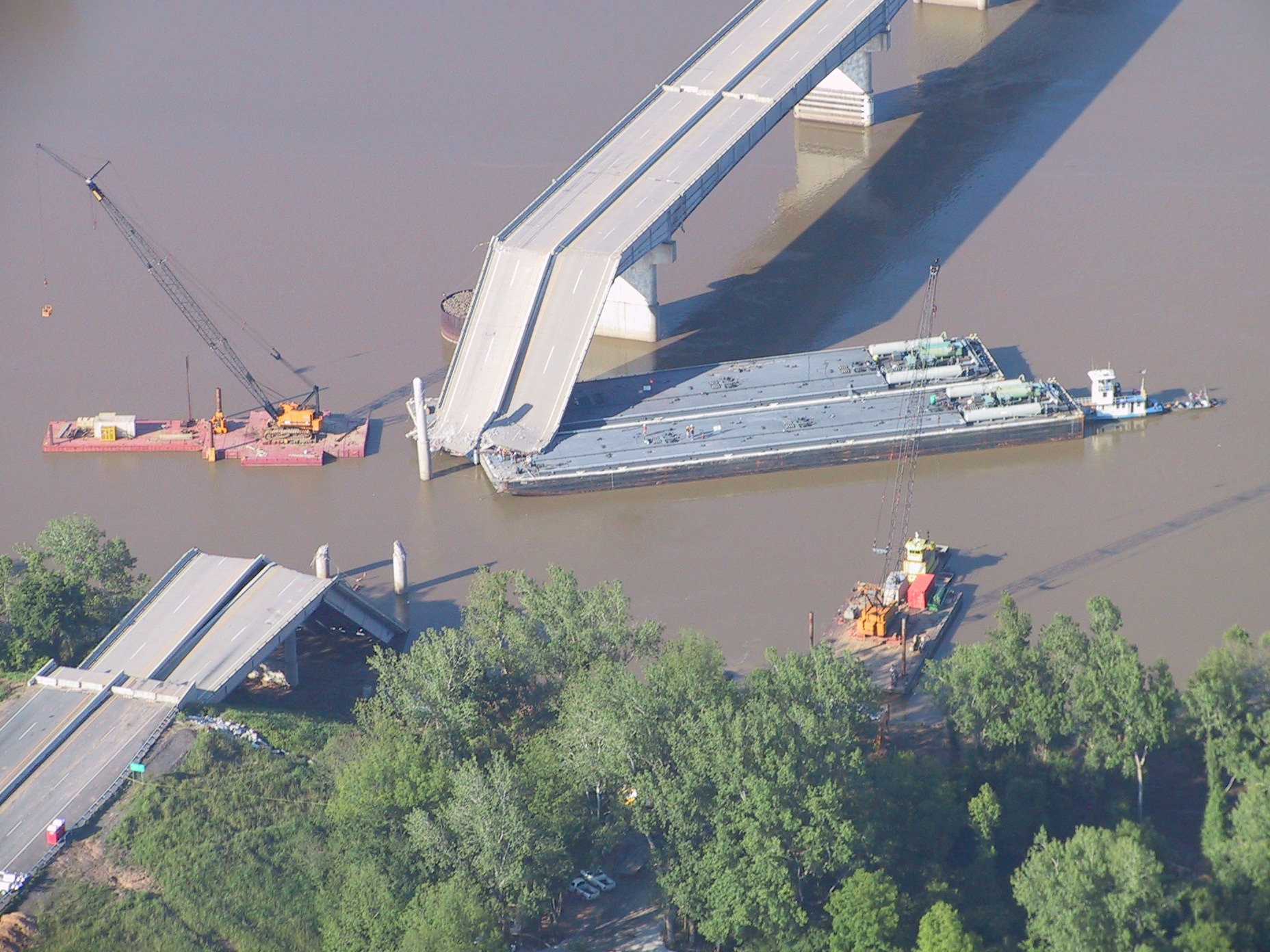
The collapsed section of the I-40 bridge, May 31, 2002

On December 23, 1988, a tanker truck hauling liquefied propane overturned on a ramp in the interchange between I-40 and I-240 in the Midtown neighborhood of Memphis, rupturing a small hole in the front of the tank. The leaking gas ignited in a massive fireball, and the tank was propelled 125 yards (114 m) from the crash site into a nearby duplex apartment. The incident killed six motorists and three occupants of nearby structures, and provided momentum for the eventual reconstruction of the interchange.

The I-40 bridge disaster occurred on May 26, 2002, when a barge collided with a bridge foundation member near Webbers Falls, Oklahoma, causing a 580-foot (180 m) section of the I-40 bridge to plunge into the Arkansas River. Automobiles and semitrailers fell into the water, killing 14 people.

On May 11, 2021, the Hernando de Soto Bridge carrying I-40 over the Mississippi River was closed when inspectors discovered a crack on a tie girder. A subsequent investigation revealed that the crack had existed since at least May 2019, and reports later surfaced that the crack had likely existed since August 2016. An emergency contract to repair the beam was awarded six days after the closure, and the bridge reopened on July 31, 2021, to eastbound traffic, and to westbound traffic on August 2, 2021.

The highway was badly damaged during Hurricane Helene in September 2024, with the road closed in multiple locations across western North Carolina due to landslides. The worst damage was seen near North Carolina's border with Tennessee, where a large portion of the highway was washed into the Pigeon River following a mudslide, resulting in it being indefinitely closed in both directions. On November 5, it was announced that the highway could reopen as early as the beginning of 2025.

== Major junctions ==
California
I-15 in Barstow
US 95 west-northwest of Needles. The highways travel concurrently to Needles.
Arizona
Future I-11 / US 93 in Kingman. The highways travel concurrently to east-northeast of Kingman.
I-17 in Flagstaff
US 89 / US 180 in Flagstaff. I-40/US 180 travels concurrently to Holbrook.
US 191 in Chambers. The highways travel concurrently to Sanders.
New Mexico
US 491 in Gallup
I-25 / US 85 in Albuquerque
US 285 in Clines Corners
US 84 west-northwest of Santa Rosa. The highways travel concurrently to Santa Rosa.
US 54 in Santa Rosa. The highways travel concurrently to Tucumcari.
Texas
US 385 in Vega
I-27 / US 60 / US 87 / US 287 in Amarillo. I-40/US 287 travels concurrently through Amarillo.
US 83 in Shamrock
Oklahoma
US 283 in Sayre
US 183 in Clinton
US 281 in Hinton
US 270 west of El Reno. The highways travel concurrently to northwest of Shawnee.
US 81 in El Reno
I-44 in Oklahoma City
I-35 / I-235 / US 62 / US 77 in Oklahoma City. I-35/I-40/US 62 travels concurrently through Oklahoma City.
I-240 in Oklahoma City
US 177 / US 270 northwest of Shawnee
US 377 south-southeast of Prague
US 62 in Okemah. The highways travel concurrently to Henryetta.
US 75 northeast of Clearview. The highways travel concurrently to Henryetta.
US 69 southwest of Checotah
US 266 in Warner
US 59 in Sallisaw
US 64 in Sallisaw
US 64 in Roland
Arkansas
I-540 / US 71 in Van Buren. I-40/US 71 travels concurrently to Alma.
I-49 in Alma
US 64 in Clarksville
US 64 in Lamar
US 64 in London
US 65 in Conway. The highways travel concurrently to North Little Rock.
US 64 in Conway
I-430 in North Little Rock
I-30 / I-57 / US 65 / US 67 / US 167 in North Little Rock. I-40/US 67/US 167 travels concurrently through North Little Rock.
I-440 in North Little Rock
US 63 in Hazen. The highways travel concurrently to Brinkley.
US 49 in Brinkley
US 79 south of Jennette. The highways travel concurrently to West Memphis.
I-55 / US 61 / US 64 in West Memphis. The highways travel concurrently through West Memphis.
Tennessee
US 51 in Memphis
I-69 / I-240 in Memphis. I-40/I-69 travels concurrently through Memphis.
US 64 / US 70 / US 79 in Memphis
US 64 on the Memphis–Bartlett city line
I-269 in Arlington
US 70 east of Brownsville
US 412 in Jackson. The highways travel concurrently to northeast of Jackson.
US 45 in Jackson
US 70 / US 412 northeast of Jackson
US 641 southeast of Holladay
I-840 southeast of Burns
US 70S in Nashville
US 70 in Nashville
I-440 in Nashville
I-65 in Nashville. The highways travel concurrently through Nashville.
US 70 in Nashville
US 70 / US 70S / US 431 in Nashville
US 31A / US 41A in Nashville
I-24 in Nashville. The highways travel concurrently through Nashville.
I-840 in Lebanon
US 231 in Lebanon
US 70 in Lebanon
US 70N in Cookeville
US 70N in Monterey
US 127 in Crossville
US 27 in Harriman
US 321 in Lenoir City
I-75 west of Farragut. The highways travel concurrently to Knoxville.
I-140 in Knoxville
US 11 / US 70 in Knoxville
I-75 / I-640 in Knoxville
US 129 in Knoxville
I-275 in Knoxville
US 441 in Knoxville
US 11W in Knoxville
I-640 / US 25W in Knoxville. I-40/US 25W travels concurrently through Knoxville.
US 11E / US 25W / US 70 in Knoxville
US 25W / US 70 west of Dandridge
I-81 north-northeast of Dandridge
US 25W / US 70 / US 411 in Newport
US 321 in Newport
North Carolina
US 276 in Cove Creek
US 74 north-northwest of Clyde. The highways travel concurrently to Asheville.
US 19 / US 23 in Asheville
I-26 / I-240 / US 74 in Asheville
US 25 in Asheville
I-240 in Asheville
US 70 in Black Mountain. The highways travel concurrently to southwest of Old Fort.
US 221 southeast of West Marion
US 64 in Morganton
US 321 in Hickory
US 64 in Statesville
US 21 in Statesville
I-77 in Statesville
US 64 in Statesville
US 64 east-northeast of Statesville
US 64 west-northwest of Mocksville
US 601 in Mocksville
US 421 in Winston-Salem
US 158 in Winston-Salem
US 52 / I-285 in Winston-Salem
I-74 in Winston-Salem
US 421 west of Greensboro. The highways travel concurrently to Greensboro.
I-73 / US 421 / I-840 in Greensboro
US 220 in Greensboro. The highways travel concurrently through Greensboro.
US 29 / US 70 in Greensboro. The highways travel concurrently through Greensboro.
I-85 / I-840 / I-785 in Greensboro. I-40/I-85 travels concurrently to southwest of Hillsborough.
US 15 / US 501 in Durham
I-885 in Durham
I-540 in Durham
I-440 / US 1 / US 64 in Raleigh. I-40/US 64 travels concurrently through Raleigh.
US 70 / US 401 in Raleigh
I-87 / I-440 / US 64 in Raleigh
US 70 in Garner. The highways travel concurrently to west-southwest of Clayton.
I-42 / US 70 near Clayton.
I-95 in Benson
US 701 south-southeast of Newton Grove
US 117 south-southeast of Warsaw
US 117 east-southeast of Willard
I-140 in Murraysville
US 117 on the Kings Grant–Murraysville CDP line

== Auxiliary routes ==
- I-140: Alcoa–Knoxville–Oak Ridge area, Tennessee
- I-140: Wilmington, North Carolina
- I-240: Oklahoma City, Oklahoma
- I-240: Memphis, Tennessee
- I-240: Asheville, North Carolina
- I-440: Little Rock, Arkansas
- I-440: Nashville, Tennessee
- I-440: Raleigh, North Carolina
- I-540: spur to Fort Smith, Arkansas
- I-540: Raleigh, North Carolina
- I-640: Knoxville, Tennessee
- I-840: partial beltway around Nashville, Tennessee
- I-840: Greensboro, North Carolina

In Oklahoma City, the designation I-440 had been given to a stretch of Interstate Highway from I-240 to US 66. It was a part of Grand Boulevard that had been built in compliance with Interstate Highway standards. In 1982, as part of Oklahoma's "Diamond Jubilee", I-44's western terminus was moved from the I-35/I-44 junction to the Texas–Oklahoma state line via the Belle Isle Freeway (connecting I-440 with I-35); I-440, the H. E. Bailey Turnpike; and the turnpike connector road on the eastern edge of Lawton, Oklahoma. The I-440 number was dropped at the time.

=== Business routes ===
- Interstate 40 Business in California: Needles
- Interstate 40 Business in Arizona: spur to Winslow, loops through Winslow, Flagstaff, Williams, Ash Fork, Seligman, and Kingman
- Interstate 40 Business in New Mexico: Tucumcari, Santa Rosa, Albuquerque, Grants, Mount Taylor, and Gallup
- Interstate 40 Business in Texas: Shamrock, McLean, Groom, Amarillo, Vega, Adrian, Texas, and Glenrio, Texas
- Interstate 40 Business in Oklahoma: Sallisaw, Henryetta, El Reno, Weatherford, Clinton, Elk City, Sayre, and Erick, Oklahoma
- Interstate 40 Business in North Carolina: formerly in both Winston-Salem and Greensboro, now Salem Parkway; Raleigh, now I-440
