= Skydance Bridge =

Pedestrian bridge and public artwork in Oklahoma City, Oklahoma, US

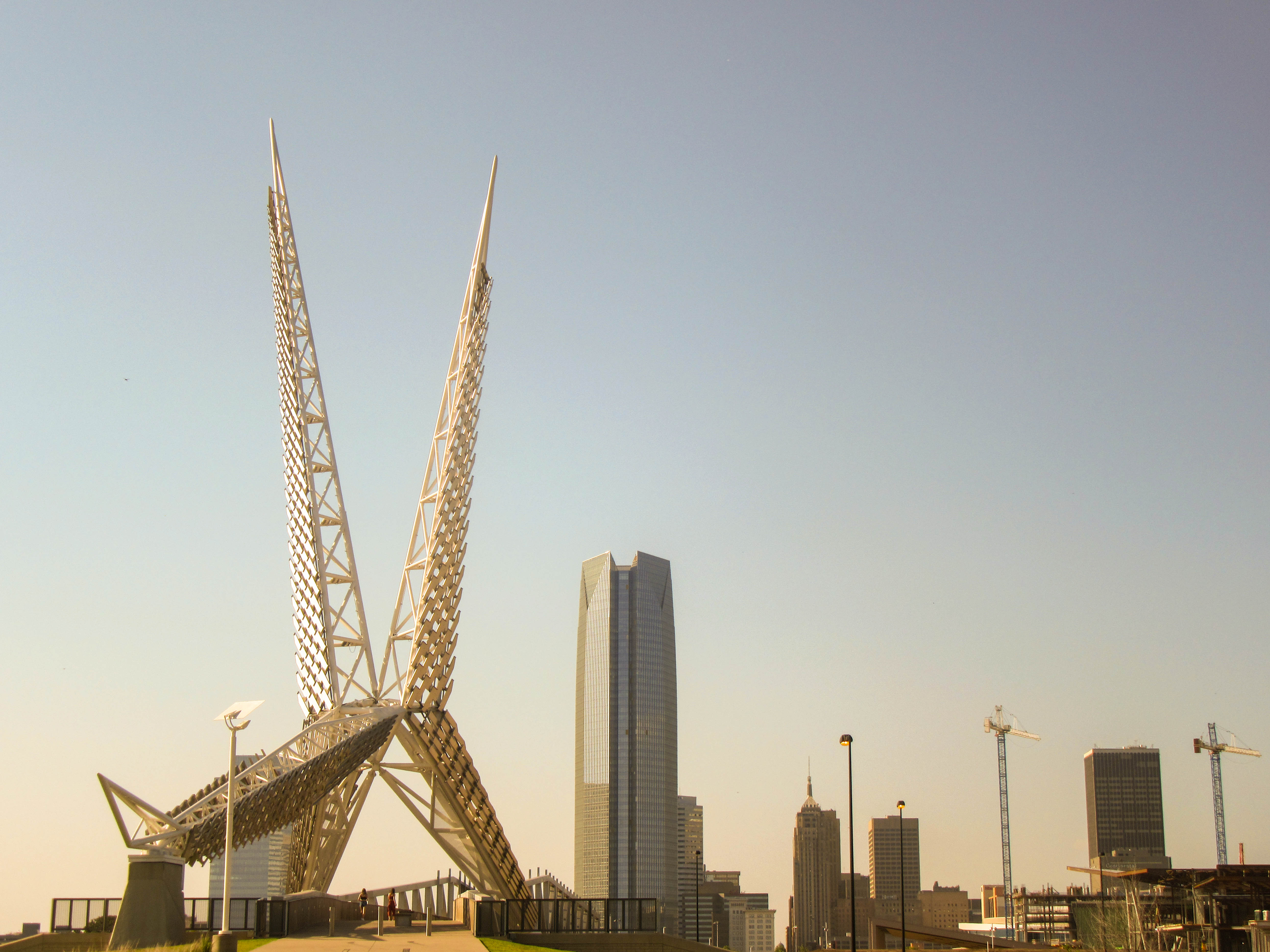
- The bridge in 2019
- Coordinates: 35°27′23″N 97°31′03″W
- Carries: Pedestrians; bicyclists
- Crosses: Interstate 40 in Oklahoma; Union Pacific Railroad line
- Locale: Downtown Oklahoma City
- Other names: Skydance Pedestrian Bridge; Scissortail Bridge
- Named for: Scissor-tailed flycatcher
- Owner: City of Oklahoma City
- Maintained by: Oklahoma Department of Transportation
- Website: www.okc.gov/departments/public-works/resident-community-resources/skydance-bridge

Characteristics
- Design: Truss bridge
- Material: Stainless Steel; Wood (2012–2019); Fiberglass (2019–present)
- Total length: 380 feet
- Width: 20 feet
- Height: 192 feet

History
- Architect: MKEC Engineering Consultants Inc.
- Designer: S-X-L
- Successful competition design: Butzer Design
- Constructed by: Manhattan Road & Bridge Co.
- Construction start: August 2011; 15 years ago
- Construction end: April 2012; 14 years ago
- Construction cost: $6.8 million
- Opened: April 23, 2012; 14 years ago
- Inaugurated: April 23, 2012; 14 years ago

Location
- Interactive map of Skydance Bridge

The Skydance Bridge (oftentimes called the Skydance Pedestrian Bridge or Scissortail Bridge) is a pedestrian bridge and public artwork in Oklahoma City, Oklahoma, United States.

== History and design ==
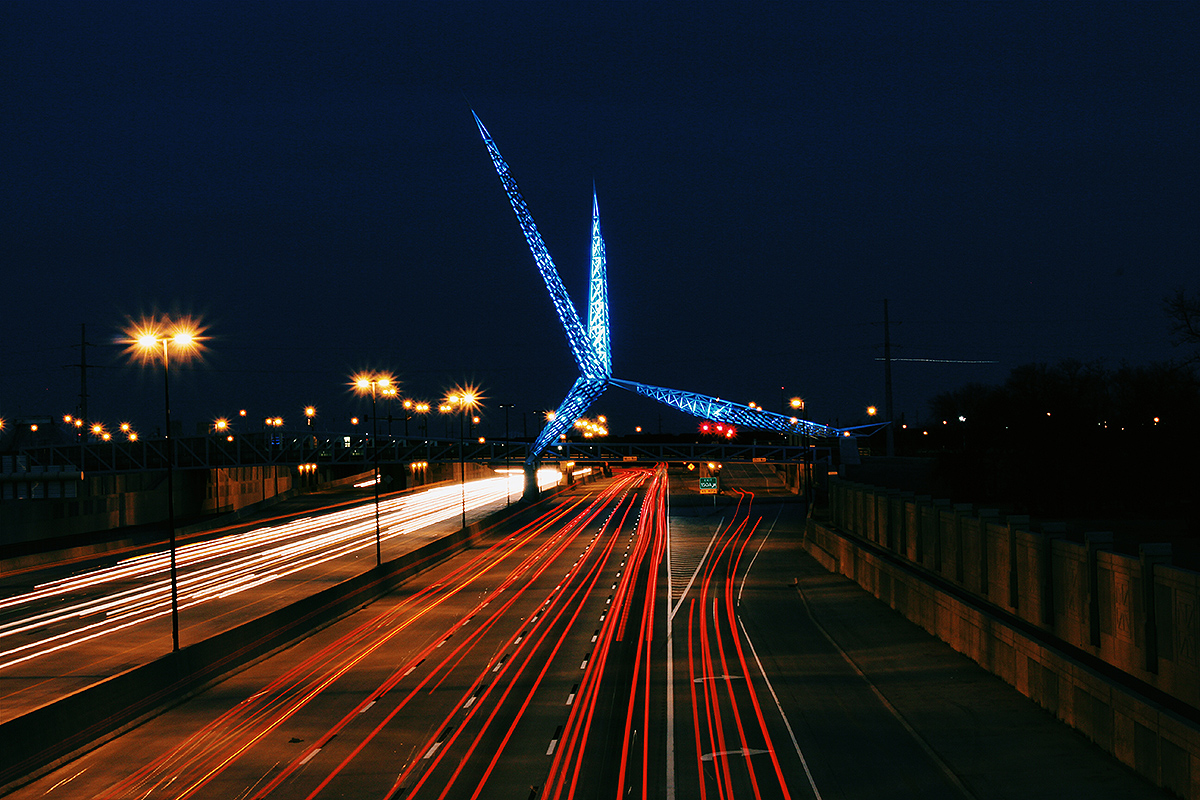
The bridge at night, 2014

On May 15, 2002, the United States Department of Transportation approved a plan for the Oklahoma City Crosstown realignment. Included in the plan was the requirement that the city build a pedestrian bridge to cross Interstate 40. In 2008, Oklahoma City mayor Mick Cornett announced a design competition for the bridge. Architects Hans and Torrey Butzer conceived of the bridge as being inspired by the mating dance of the scissor-tailed flycatcher, Oklahoma's state bird. The double-winged structure would be a sculptural landmark and provide support to a pedestrian deck that connects two portions of Oklahoma City's Scissortail Park. The concept was developed into the competition-winning design by Hans Butzer, Stan Carroll, Ken Fitzsimmons, Jeremy Gardner, Bret Johnston, Laurent Massenat, Chris Ramseyer, and David Wanzer in collaboration with MKEC Inc.

The location of the bridge was chosen as part of the "Core to Shore" initiative, which was intended to connect the core of downtown Oklahoma City to the shore of the Oklahoma River. An urban park was in the early stages of planning in the same area as part of the MAPS 3 project; the bridge connects the park's upper and lower portions.

The city allocated a budget of $6.8 million. The cost was originally estimated to be around $5.2 million, but unexpected problems pushed the estimate to $12.8 million. To lower costs, part of the bridge was redesigned, including the elimination of large cables originally intended to stretch from the top of the bird design to the base of the bridge. Construction was originally expected to run from March to November 2011, but due to the cost issues construction did not begin until August 2011. It was constructed at the same time as the new Interstate 40.

The Manhattan Road & Bridge Company built the 380-feet long, 192-feet tall, 20-feet wide bridge. The bird sculpture was completed in December 2011, and construction was finished in April 2012. The bridge officially opened on April 23, 2012, with a ribbon-cutting ceremony which included appearances by design architects and public officials. The design includes fully programmable energy efficient LED lights that illuminate the bridge from dusk to dawn.

In June 2019, city leaders approved a $840,000 repair project on the bridge to replace the wood deck, which had reached its lifespan. It was replaced with a composite fiberglass deck and underwent construction from summer 2019 through summer 2020.

== Reception ==
In 2012, the structure was named one of the 50 best public art projects in the United States by the Americans for the Arts' "Public Art Network Year in Review".

== See also ==
- 2012 in art
