= Interstate 40 in Oklahoma =

Highway in Oklahoma

Interstate 40
- I-40 highlighted in red

Route information
- Maintained by ODOT
- Length: 331 mi (533 km)
- Existed: 1957–present
- NHS: Entire route

Major junctions
- West end: I-40 at the Texas state line in Texola
- US 283 in Sayre; US 81 in El Reno; I-344 Toll / Kilpatrick Turnpike in Oklahoma City; I-44 in Oklahoma City; I-35 / I-235 / US 77 in Oklahoma City; I-240 in Oklahoma City; I-335 Toll / Kickapoo Turnpike in Oklahoma City; Indian Nation Turnpike in Henryetta; US 69 in Checotah; Muskogee Turnpike near Webbers Falls
- East end: I-40 at the Arkansas state line near Roland

Location
- Country: United States
- State: Oklahoma
- Counties: Beckham, Washita, Custer, Caddo, Canadian, Oklahoma, Pottawatomie, Seminole, Okfuskee, Okmulgee, McIntosh, Muskogee, Sequoyah

Highway system
- Interstate Highway System; Main; Auxiliary; Suffixed; Business; Future; Oklahoma State Highway System; Interstate; US; State; Turnpikes
← SH-39	→ SH-42

Interstate 40 (I-40) is an Interstate Highway in Oklahoma that runs 331 miles (533 km) across the state from Texas to Arkansas. West of Oklahoma City, it parallels and replaces old U.S. Route 66 (US 66) and east of Oklahoma City, it parallels US 62, US 266 and US 64. I-40 is the longest Interstate highway in Oklahoma.

Cities along the route include Erick, Sayre, Elk City, Clinton, Weatherford, Oklahoma City and its suburbs (El Reno, Yukon, Del City and Midwest City), Shawnee, Okemah, Henryetta, Checotah and Sallisaw.

== Route description ==
I-40 enters Oklahoma near Texola in Beckham County. It crosses the North Fork of the Red River near Sayre and runs through southern Elk City. It then cuts across northwest Washita County before entering Custer County. There, it passes through Clinton and Weatherford. After leaving Weatherford, I-40 then runs across northern Caddo County. After that, it enters the Oklahoma City metropolitan area at Canadian County.

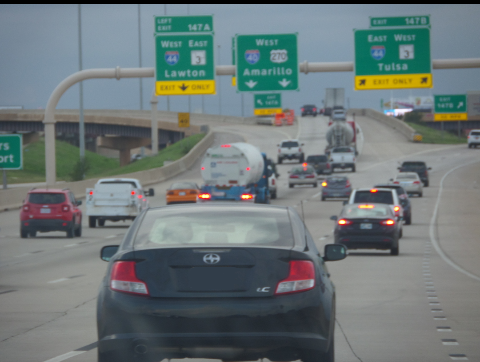
I-40 and I-44 junction (also known as the Amarillo Junction) traveling westbound in Oklahoma City

I-40 runs through the southside of El Reno as it enters the Oklahoma City metropolitan area. It then passes through Yukon before entering Oklahoma City city limits. In west Oklahoma City, I-40 has a junction with I-44. It then runs just south of downtown Oklahoma City on a new 10-lane section. I-40 then interlines with I-35 at the Dallas Junction complex. This forms a concurrency with it for two miles (3.2 km). After the Dallas Junction, I-40 then passes through Del City and Midwest City on the Tinker Diagonal. This provides access to Tinker Air Force Base in east Oklahoma City.

In far eastern Oklahoma City, I-40 meets I-240 in a partial junction. Afterward, it passes through the northside of Shawnee. This marks the eastern end of the Oklahoma City metropolitan area. In Henryetta, I-40 serves as the northern terminus of the Indian Nation Turnpike. In McIntosh County, it crosses the northernmost arm of Lake Eufaula. Afterward, it meets US 69 south of Checotah.

Near Webbers Falls, I-40 is the southern terminus of the Muskogee Turnpike. It then crosses the Arkansas River before passing through southern Sallisaw. The Interstate crosses into Arkansas north of Moffett.

== History ==
West of Oklahoma City, I-40 parallels and replaces Old US 66. US 66 was decommissioned in Oklahoma in 1985.

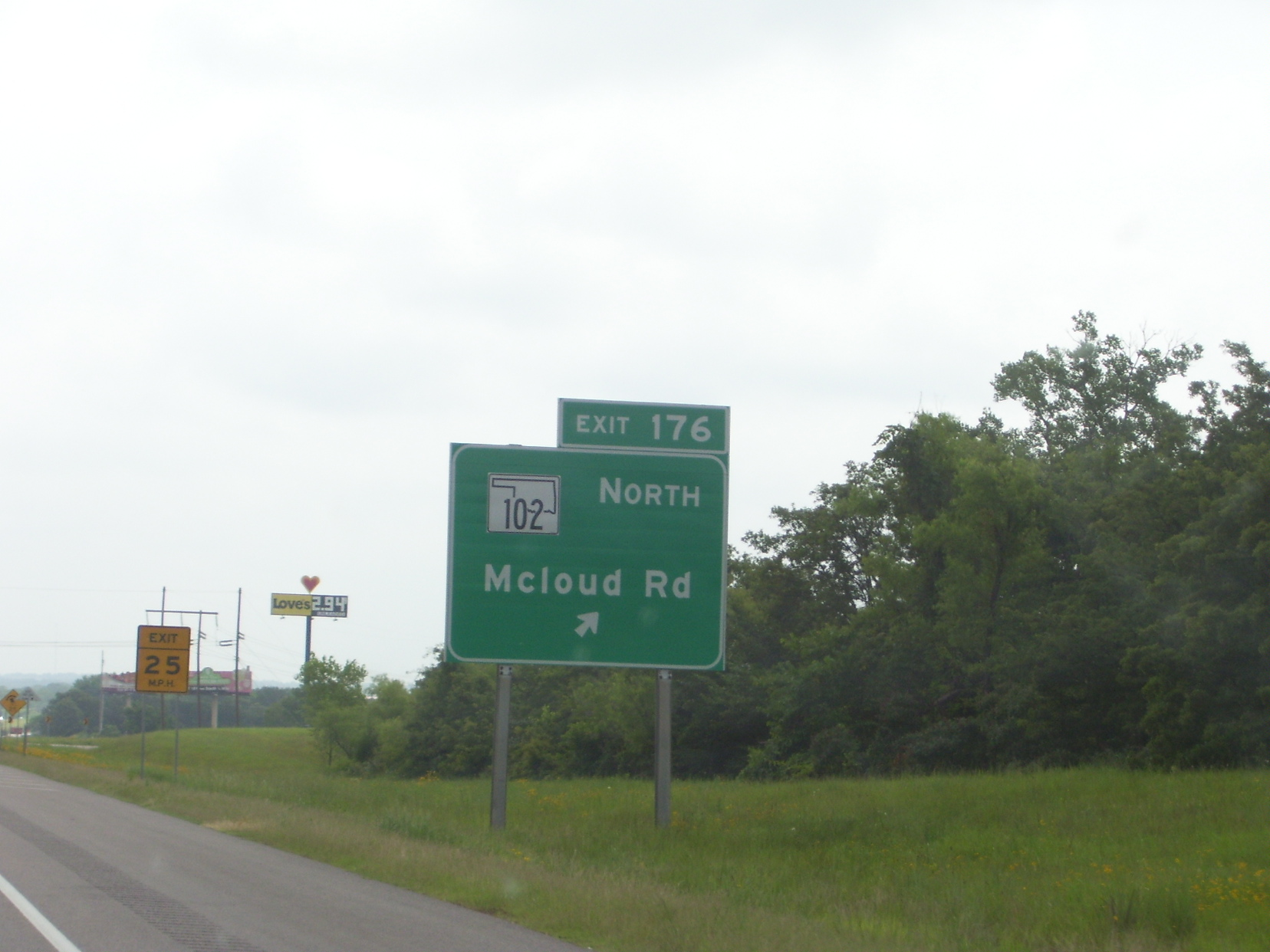
Exit 176

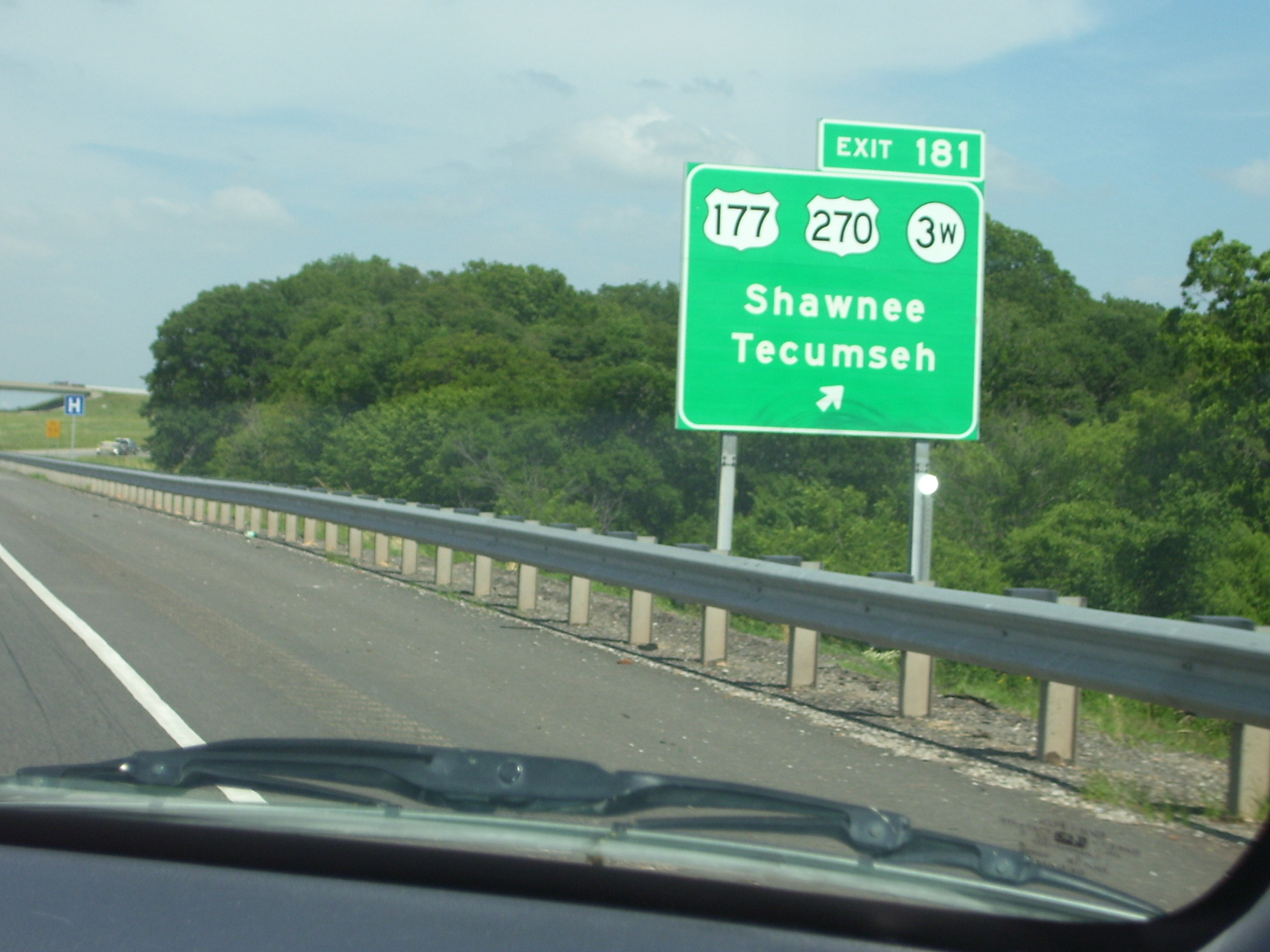
Exit 181

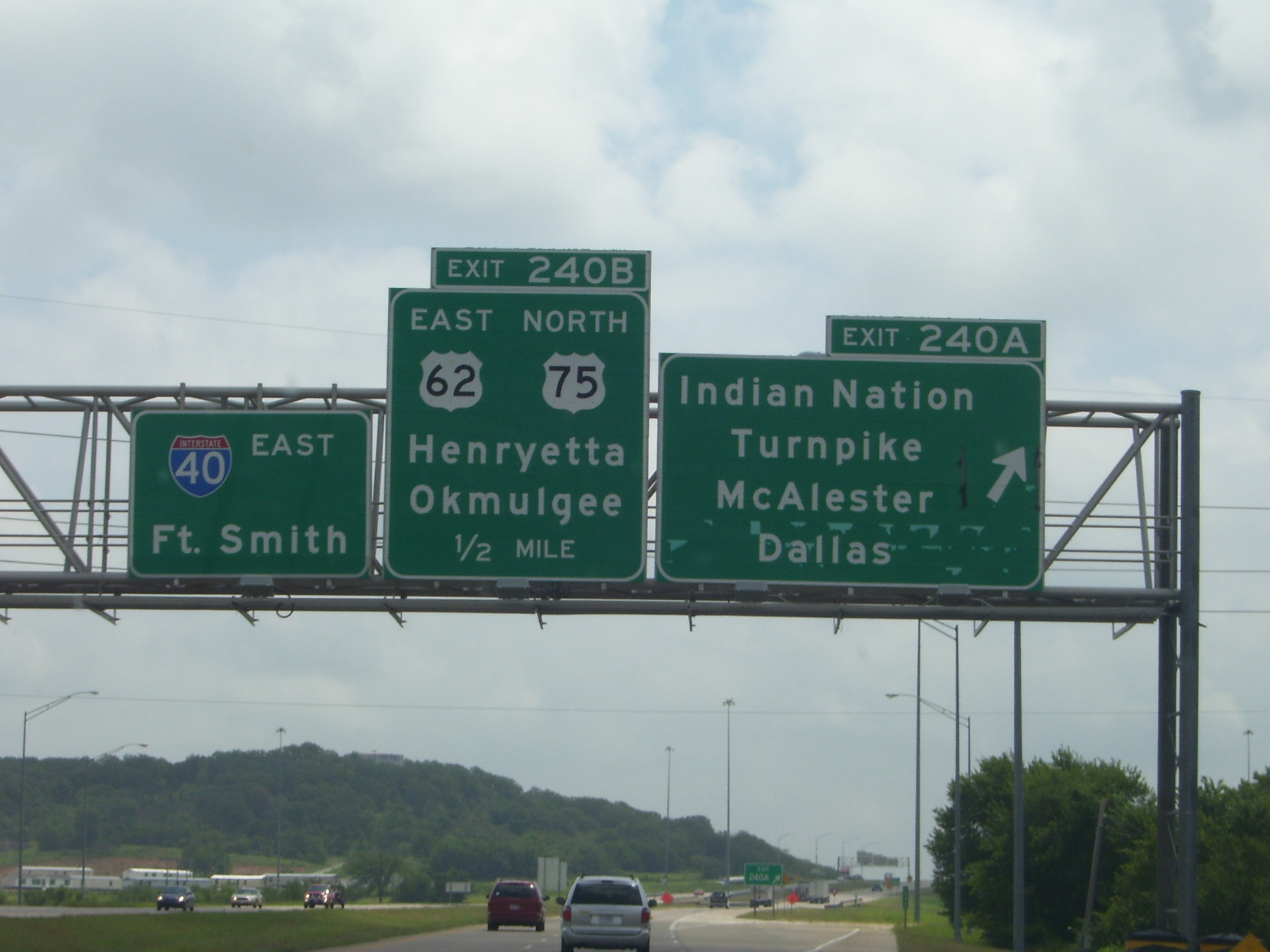
Exit 240A

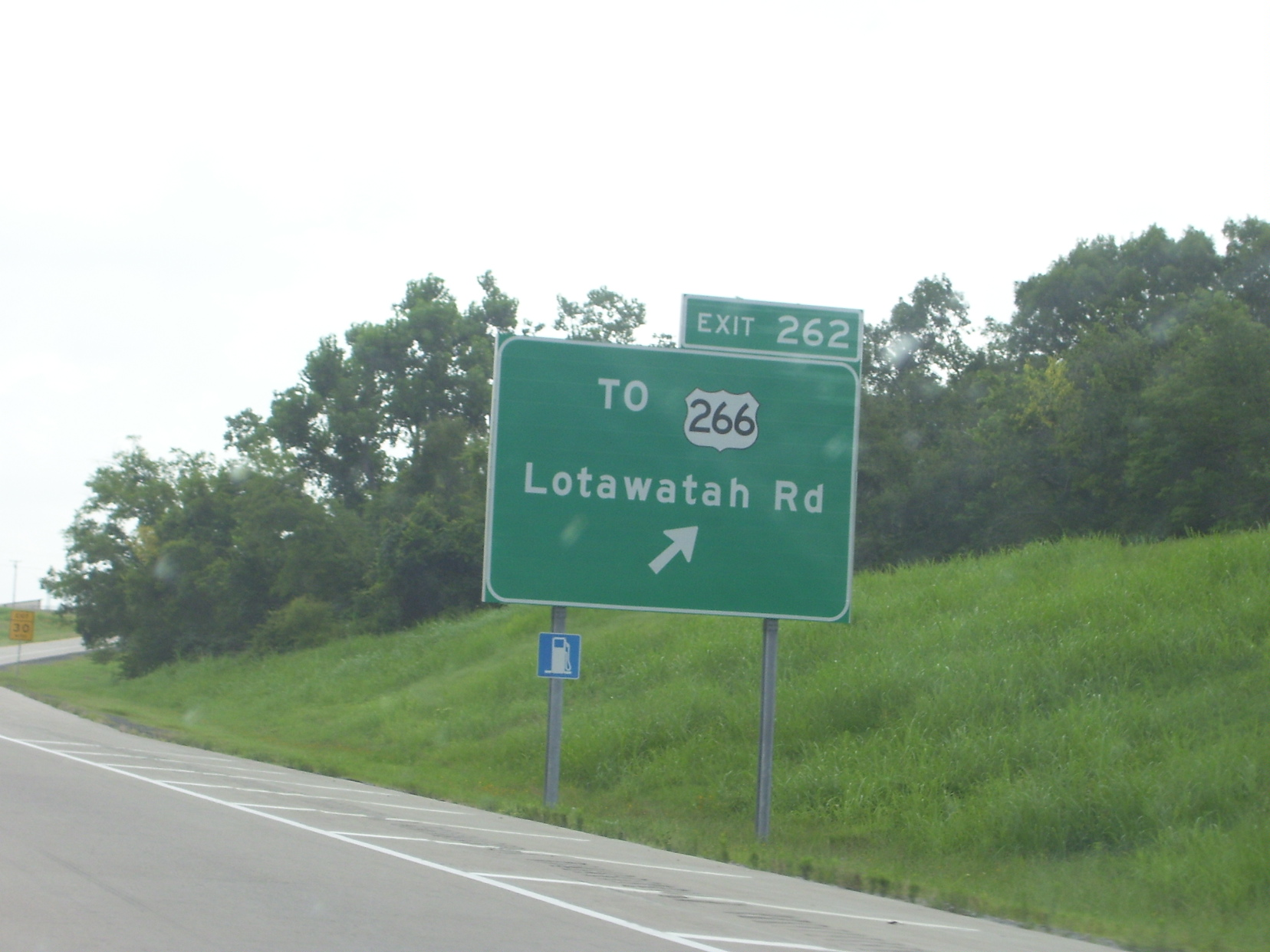
Exit 262

=== 2002 bridge collapse ===
The I-40 bridge over the McClellan–Kerr Arkansas River Navigation System near Webbers Falls was struck by a barge on May 26, 2002, causing the bridge to collapse and resulting in the death of 14 people.

Westbound I-40 traffic was detoured through Gore and Webbers Falls along SH-10, US 64 and SH-100, while eastbound traffic was diverted through Porum and Stigler along SH-2, SH-9 and US 59. Delays of 30 to 50 minutes on the 12-mile (19 km) westbound detour were typical, although trains passing through Gore could lengthen wait times by 15 minutes. The eastbound detour added 40 miles (64 km) and two hours to the typical trip. Some travelers chose to avoid the area entirely; one Tulsa trucking firm detoured trucks via Springdale, adding 70 miles (110 km) to the trip.

The detour significantly impacted the town of Gore. Local firefighters directed traffic there 24 hours a day, with daytime temperatures approaching 100 °F (38 °C). Businesses in Gore reported loss of revenue due to the traffic; one gas station reported a 30% decline in revenue while traffic was detoured through town.

=== 2012 Oklahoma City Crosstown realignment ===
The original I-40 Oklahoma City Crosstown Expressway was built in 1966 mostly as an elevated route; however, this former stretch was too narrow for existing traffic and was frequently in disrepair. In response, the I-40 Crosstown Expressway has been relocated a few blocks south of the original route and the original bridge torn down. The project was completed on February 17, 2012.

The new I-40 Crosstown Expressway has been designed to carry more than 170,000 vehicles per day traveling at 60 mph (97 km/h) using at least 10 lanes for traffic and has breakdown lanes for disabled vehicles and future lane expansion.

When the new crosstown opened in 2012, nearly 95% of non–rush hour traffic was considered 'through traffic' (i.e., not transferring to or from downtown streets).

A landscaped boulevard (Oklahoma City Boulevard) was completed in 2019, replacing the original I-40 Crosstown Bridge right-of-way through downtown Oklahoma City, similar to the I-30 reconstruction through downtown Fort Worth, Texas.

=== 2013 tornado ===
On the evening of May 31, 2013, a very large and powerful multiple-vortex tornado occurred over rural areas of central Oklahoma, passing around El Reno, Oklahoma. This is known to be the largest tornado ever recorded at 2.6 miles (4.2 km) wide and was responsible for eight fatalities and 151 injuries. Four of those fatalities were storm chasers, the first known deaths in storm chasing history. This tornado crossed over I-40 at around 6:33 pm CDT after hitting peak strength and maximum width and did a 270-degree counterclockwise loop north of the Interstate, clipping SH-66 before traveling on and along the Interstate, approaching Oklahoma City at a very slow speed. The tornado dissipated at 6:43 pm near exit 130 (Banner Road).

=== 2015 shootings ===
On December 17, 2015, a Pasadena, Texas, man allegedly shot and killed two people on I-40 near Weatherford, Oklahoma. He was arrested by police in Clinton, Oklahoma.

== Business routes and old alignments ==

I-40 has eight business routes in Oklahoma, six of which are old alignments of US 66. A number of other old alignments of US-66 are also present west of Oklahoma City.

- Interstate 40 Business (I-40 Bus., formerly US 66) in Erick is a business loop that runs from I-40 two miles (3.2 km) west of Erick to the old alignment of US 66, through Erick and back to I-40 four miles (6.4 km) east of Erick.
- I-40 Bus. (formerly US 66) in Sayre is a business loop that begins two miles (3.2 km) south of Sayre at US 283, runs north into the city and then leaves Sayre to the east, rejoining I-40 two miles (3.2 km) east of US 283.
- I-40 Bus. (formerly US 66) in Elk City is a business loop that begins at exit 32 seven miles (11 km) west of Elk City. It runs for 10 miles (16 km) through Elk City, rejoining I-40 at exit 41.
- I-40 Bus. (formerly US 66) in Clinton is a business loop that begins at exit 65, runs five miles (8.0 km) through Clinton and rejoins I-40 at exit 69.
- I-40 Bus. (formerly US 66) in Weatherford is a business loop that exits I-40 at exit 82B, runs four miles (6.4 km) through Weatherford and rejoins I-40 at exit 82.
- I-40 Bus. (formerly US 66) in El Reno is a business loop that exits I-40 at exit 119, runs eight miles (13 km) through El Reno and rejoins I-40 at exit 125, the interchange with US 81.
- I-40 Bus. (formerly US 62/US 75) in Henryetta is a business loop that leaves I-40 at exit 237, runs four miles (6.4 km) through Henryetta and rejoins I-40 at exit 240, the interchange with US 75 and the Indian Nation Turnpike.
- I-40 Bus. in Sallisaw is a business loop that leaves I-40 at exit 308 (US 59) runs four miles (6.4 km) through Sallisaw and rejoins I-40 at exit 311, US 64.

== Exit list ==
County	Location	mi	km	Exit	Destinations	Notes
Beckham	Texola	0.00	0.00		I-40 west – Amarillo	Continuation into Texas
Beckham	Texola	0.50	0.80	1	Texola	
Beckham		5.05	8.13	5	I-40 BL east (Honeyfarm Road) – Erick	
Beckham	Erick	7.35	11.83	7	SH-30 – Erick, Sweetwater	
Beckham		11.65	18.75	11	I-40 BL west – Erick	
Beckham		14.30	23.01	14	Hext Road	
Beckham	Sayre	20.76	33.41	20	US 283 / I-40 BL east (S. 4th Street) – Mangum	
Beckham	Sayre	23.33	37.55	23	SH-152 (Main Street) – New Cordell	
Beckham	Sayre	25.01	40.25	25	I-40 BL west (N. 4th Street)	
Beckham	Sayre	26.90	43.29	26	Cemetery Road	
Beckham	Elk City	32.50– 32.91	52.30– 52.96	32	SH-34 south / I-40 BL east – Carter, Mangum, Elk City	Western end of SH-34 concurrency
Beckham	Elk City	34.89	56.15	34	Merritt Road	
Beckham	Elk City	38.79	62.43	38	SH-6 (S. Main Street) – Altus	
Beckham	Elk City	40.49	65.16	40	E. 7th Street	
Beckham	Elk City	41.32– 41.74	66.50– 67.17	41	SH-34 north / I-40 BL west – Woodward, Elk City	Eastern end of SH-34 concurrency
Washita	Canute	46.91	75.49	47	Canute	
Washita		50.52	81.30	50	Clinton Lake Road	
Washita	Foss	53.25	85.70	53	SH-44 – Foss, Altus	
Custer		57.20	92.05	57	Stafford Road	
Custer		60.90	98.01	61	Haggard Road	
Custer		62.37	100.37	62	Parkersburg Road	
Custer	Clinton	64.83	104.33	65	I-40 BL east (Gary Boulevard)	No eastbound entrance
Custer	Clinton	65.45	105.33	65A	10th Street / Neptune Drive	Historic US 66
Custer	Clinton	66.10	106.38	66	US 183 (S. 4th Street) – Cordell	
Custer		68.94	110.95	69	I-40 BL west – Clinton	Westbound exit and eastbound entrance
Custer		71.69	115.37	71	Custer City Road	
Custer	Weatherford	79.80	128.43	80	SH-54 – Thomas, Mountain View	
Custer	Weatherford	80.50	129.55	80A	I-40 BL east (SW Main Street) – Southwestern Oklahoma State University	Eastbound exit and westbound entrance
Custer	Weatherford	81.76	131.58	81	Washington Avenue / E. Main Street	Eastbound exit and westbound entrance at E. Eads Avenue
Custer	Weatherford	81.99	131.95	82	I-40 BL west (E. Main Street)	Westbound exit and eastbound entrance
Custer	Weatherford	84.05	135.27	84	Airport Road	
Caddo		88.52– 88.97	142.46– 143.18	88	SH-58 – Hydro, Carnegie	
Caddo		95.00	152.89	95	Bethel Road	
Caddo	Hinton	101.43	163.24	101	US 281 / SH-8 – Hinton, Anadarko	
Canadian		104.48	168.14	104	Methodist Road	
Canadian	Geary	108.14	174.03	108	US 281 Spur – Geary, Watonga	
Canadian		115.15	185.32	115	US 270 west – Calumet	Western end of US 270 concurrency
Canadian		119.11	191.69	119	I-40 BL east – El Reno	
Canadian	El Reno	123.40	198.59	123	Country Club Road	
Canadian	El Reno	125.50	201.97	125	US 81 / I-40 BL west – El Reno, Chickasha	
Canadian	El Reno	127.48	205.16	127	Radio Road	
Canadian		130.47	209.97	130	Banner Road	
Canadian	Oklahoma City	132.48	213.21	132	Cimarron Road – Clarence E. Page Municipal Airport	
Canadian	Oklahoma City–Yukon line	134.55	216.54	134	Frisco Road	Opened in August 2021
Canadian	Yukon	135.69	218.37	136	Garth Brooks Boulevard	Former SH-92
Canadian	Oklahoma City	136.89	220.30	137	Cornwell Drive / Czech Hall Road	Eastbound exit and entrance on Czech Hall Road; westbound exit and entrance from NW 10th Street
Canadian	Oklahoma City	138.07	222.20	138A	SH-4 (Mustang Road / Yukon Parkway)	Signed as exit 139B westbound
Canadian	Oklahoma City	138.95	223.62	138B	I-344 Toll / Kilpatrick Turnpike	Signed as exit 139A westbound
Canadian	Oklahoma City	140.21	225.65	140	Morgan Road	
Oklahoma	Oklahoma City	142.18	228.82	142	Council Road	
Oklahoma	Oklahoma City	143.17	230.41	143	Rockwell Avenue	
Oklahoma	Oklahoma City	144.16	232.00	144	MacArthur Boulevard	
Oklahoma	Oklahoma City	145.16	233.61	145	Meridian Avenue	
Oklahoma	Oklahoma City	146.16	235.22	146	Portland Avenue	Eastbound exit and westbound entrance
Oklahoma	Oklahoma City	146.60	235.93	147	I-44 / SH-3 – Lawton, Tulsa	Signed as exits 147A (west) and 147B (east); I-44 exits 120A-B
Oklahoma	Oklahoma City	147.15	236.81	147C	May Avenue – Fair Park	Merged with exit 148A upon I-40 Crosstown realignment; was westbound exit and eastbound entrance
Oklahoma	Oklahoma City	147.72	237.73	148A	Agnew Avenue / Villa Avenue / May Avenue	May Avenue not signed eastbound
Oklahoma	Oklahoma City	147.95	238.10	148B	Oklahoma City Boulevard east	Eastbound exit and westbound entrance; former Oklahoma City Crosstown Expressway alignment
Oklahoma	Oklahoma City	148.16	238.44	148C	Pennsylvania Avenue	Formerly exit 148B (that was eastbound exit and westbound entrance only) on old alignment
Oklahoma	Oklahoma City			148C	Virginia Avenue	Closed upon I-40 Crosstown realignment; was westbound exit and eastbound entrance
Oklahoma	Oklahoma City	149.20	240.11	149	Western Avenue	Formerly also served Reno Avenue and Sheridan Avenue on exit 149A of old alignment
Oklahoma	Oklahoma City			149B	Classen Boulevard	Closed upon I-40 Crosstown realignment; was westbound exit and eastbound entrance
Oklahoma	Oklahoma City			150A	Walker Avenue – Downtown Oklahoma City	Closed upon I-40 Crosstown realignment; was eastbound exit and westbound entrance
Oklahoma	Oklahoma City			150B	Harvey Avenue	Closed upon I-40 Crosstown realignment; was eastbound exit only
Oklahoma	Oklahoma City	150.15	241.64	150A	Shields Boulevard	No westbound exit
Oklahoma	Oklahoma City	150.00	241.40	150B	Robinson Avenue	Westbound exit only; formerly exit 150C on old alignment; location of Skydance Bridge
Oklahoma	Oklahoma City	150.94	242.91	151A	Oklahoma City Boulevard west	Westbound exit and eastbound entrance
Oklahoma	Oklahoma City			151A	Lincoln Boulevard	Closed upon I-40 Crosstown realignment; was eastbound exit only; former SH-107
Oklahoma	Oklahoma City	151.35	243.57	151B	I-35 south / US 77 south / US 62 west – Dallas	Western end of I-35/US 62 concurrency; no exit number westbound
Oklahoma	Oklahoma City	151.35	243.57	151C	I-235 north / US 77 north – Edmond, State Capitol, Oklahoma Health Center	Signed as I-35 exit 126 westbound
Oklahoma	Oklahoma City	152.35	245.18	127	Eastern Avenue / M. L. King Avenue	Eastbound exit and westbound entrance; exit number follows I-35
Oklahoma	Oklahoma City	152.90	246.07	153	I-35 north / US 62 east to I-44 – Wichita, Tulsa	Eastern end of I-35/US 62 concurrency
Oklahoma	Del City	153.68	247.32	154	Reno Avenue / Scott Street	
Oklahoma	Del City	154.63	248.85	155A	Sunnylane Road – Del City	
Oklahoma	Del City	155.29	249.92	155B	SE 15th Street – Del City, Midwest City	
Oklahoma	Midwest City	155.84	250.80	156A	Sooner Road	
Oklahoma	Midwest City	156.38	251.67	156B	Hudiburg Drive	No eastbound entrance
Oklahoma	Midwest City	156.87	252.46	157A	SE 29th Street – Midwest City	Eastbound exit only
Oklahoma	Midwest City	157.12	252.86	157B	Air Depot Boulevard – Tinker Gate	
Oklahoma	Midwest City	157.61	253.65	157C	Town Center Drive – Eaker Gate	
Oklahoma	Midwest City	158.65	255.32	159A	Hruskocy Gate (Industrial Boulevard)	Eastbound exit and westbound entrance only
Oklahoma	Midwest City	159.14	256.11	159B	Douglas Boulevard – Lancer Gate, Liberator Gate, Marauder Gate	
Oklahoma	Oklahoma City	162.36	261.29	162	Anderson Road	
Oklahoma	Oklahoma City	164.02	263.96	165	I-240 west / SH-3 west – Lawton, Dallas	Western end of SH-3 concurrency; westbound exit and eastbound entrance
Oklahoma	Oklahoma City	165.72	266.70	166	Choctaw Road	
Oklahoma	Oklahoma City	168.77	271.61	169	Peebly Road	
Oklahoma	Oklahoma City	170.55	274.47	170	I-335 Toll north / Kickapoo Turnpike north – Tulsa, Edmond	Access to Turnpike southbound to be under construction; I-335 exits 130A-B
Oklahoma	Oklahoma City	171.75	276.40	172	Newalla Road – Harrah	
Pottawatomie	McLoud	175.71	282.78	176	SH-102 north (Mcloud Road)	Western end of SH-102 concurrency
Pottawatomie	McLoud	177.78	286.11	178	SH-102 south – Dale, Bethel Acres	Eastern end of SH-102 concurrency
Pottawatomie		180.85	291.05	181	US 177 / US 270 east / SH-3W east / SH-3 ends / SH-3E begins – Shawnee, Tecumseh, Stillwater	Eastern end of US 270/SH-3 concurrency; western end of SH-3E concurrency; SH-3 splits into SH-3E and SH-3W
Pottawatomie	Shawnee	184.85	297.49	185	Kickapoo Street – Shawnee	
Pottawatomie	Shawnee	185.84	299.08	186	SH-3E east / SH-18 – Shawnee, Meeker	Eastern end of SH-3E concurrency
Pottawatomie		191.84	308.74	192	SH-9A south – Earlsboro	
Seminole		199.49	321.05	200	US 377 / SH-99 – Prague, Seminole	
Seminole		211.55	340.46	212	SH-56 – Cromwell, Wewoka	
Okfuskee		216.49	348.41	217	SH-48 – Holdenville, Bristow	
Okfuskee	Okemah	221.02	355.70	221	US 62 west / SH-27 – Okemah, Wetumka	Western end of US 62 concurrency
Okfuskee		227.04	365.39	227	Clearview Road	
Okfuskee		231.06	371.86	231	US 75 south – Wetumka, Weleetka	Western end of US 75 concurrency
Okmulgee	Henryetta	237.10	381.58	237	I-40 BL east – Henryetta	
Okmulgee	Henryetta	239.67	385.71	240A	Indian Nation Turnpike south – McAlester, Dallas	Indian Nation Turnpike exits 104A-B
Okmulgee	Henryetta	239.67	385.71	240B	US 62 east / US 75 north / I-40 BL west – Henryetta, Okmulgee	Eastern end of US 62/US 75 concurrency
McIntosh		247.15	397.75	247	Tiger Mountain Road	
McIntosh		254.44	409.48	255	Pierce Road	
McIntosh		258.42	415.89	259	SH-150 (Lake Eufaula Road)	
McIntosh		261.46	420.78	262	Lotawatah Road to US 266	
McIntosh	Checotah	264.20	425.19	264	US 69 – Eufaula, McAlester, Dallas	Signed as exits 264A (south) and 264B (north)
McIntosh	Checotah	265.07	426.59	265	US 69 Bus. – Checotah	
McIntosh		269.42	433.59	270	Texanna Road – Porum Landing	
Muskogee		277.83	447.12	278	US 266 / SH-2 – Muskogee, Warner, Porum	
Muskogee		283.69	456.55	284	Ross Road	
Muskogee	Webbers Falls	285.70	459.79	286	Muskogee Turnpike west – Muskogee, Tulsa	
Muskogee	Webbers Falls	286.78	461.53	287	SH-100 north – Webbers Falls, Gore	
Arkansas River				I-40 Bridge		
Sequoyah	Carlisle	290.84	468.06	291	SH-10 north (Carlisle Road) – Gore	
Sequoyah		296.94	477.88	297	SH-82 – Vian, Tahlequah	
Sequoyah		302.59	486.97	303	Dwight Mission Road	
Sequoyah	Sallisaw	307.14	494.29	308	US 59 / I-40 BL east – Sallisaw, Poteau	
Sequoyah	Sallisaw	309.85	498.66	311	US 64 / I-40 BL west – Sallisaw, Stilwell	
Sequoyah	Muldrow	320.17	515.26	321	SH-64B north – Muldrow	
Sequoyah	Roland	324.40	522.07	325	US 64 – Roland, Fort Smith	
Sequoyah		330.10	531.24	330	SH-64D south – Dora, Fort Smith	Eastbound exit and westbound entrance
Sequoyah		330.20	531.41		I-40 east – Little Rock	Continuation into Arkansas
1.000 mi = 1.609 km; 1.000 km = 0.621 mi: Closed/former; Concurrency terminus; Electronic toll collection; Incomplete access

== Auxiliary route ==
I-40 has one auxiliary route in Oklahoma:

- I-240: A bypass of the southside of Oklahoma City

== See also ==
- U.S. Route 66 in Oklahoma

Interstate 40
Previous state: Texas	Oklahoma	Next state: Arkansas
