= Interstate 235 (Oklahoma) =

Interstate Highway in Oklahoma City

Interstate 235
- Central Expressway, Centennial Expressway
- I-235 highlighted in red

Route information
- Auxiliary route of I-35
- Maintained by ODOT
- Length: 5.38 mi (8.66 km)
- Existed: 1984–present
- Component highways: US 77
- NHS: Entire route

Major junctions
- South end: I-35 / I-40 / US 62 / US 77 / US 270 in Oklahoma City
- North end: I-44 / US 77 / SH-66 in Oklahoma City

Location
- Country: United States
- State: Oklahoma
- Counties: Oklahoma

Highway system
- Interstate Highway System; Main; Auxiliary; Suffixed; Business; Future; Oklahoma State Highway System; Interstate; US; State; Turnpikes
← SH-209	→ I-240

Interstate 235 (I-235) is an auxiliary route of Interstate 35 (I-35). Located in Oklahoma City, the freeway runs concurrent with U.S. Route 77 (US 77). It is part of the Interstate Highway System and provides access to the Downtown and North Central areas of the city. I-235 has a north/south alignment and connects the I-35/Interstate 40 (I-40) junction to Interstate 44 (I-44). The freeway then continues north as the Broadway Extension to the suburban city of Edmond.

Planning for the route began in 1972, then called the Central Expressway. City officials initially faced issues in funding the route until it was given an interstate designation in 1976. After this, further problems acquiring the right of way delayed the project for extended periods of time for civil rights issues. The route was ultimately improved in 1981 with construction beginning two years later. Phase 1 opened in 1984, although the full route was not completed until 1989. It was renamed the Centennial Expressway to coincide with the 100-year anniversary of the Oklahoma Land Rush.

== Route description ==
Full time-lapse drive of I-235 from I-35 South/I-40 West to I-44 West

Interstate 235 begins on the southeast side of Downtown Oklahoma City, at a junction with I-35 and I-40, which have concurrencies with U.S. Route 62 (US 62) and U.S. Route 270 (US 270). In addition to providing full access to both interstates, there are several exits and entrances providing access to or from Oklahoma City Boulevard, Sheridan Avenue, Lincoln Boulevard, Harrison Avenue, North 10th Street, and North 6th Street. These routes provide access to Downtown, the Oklahoma Health Center, the Oklahoma State Capitol, and the Oklahoma City National Memorial.

From there, the interstate continues north where there are full interchanges with North 23rd Street and North 36th Street. The 23rd Street exit is also signed for the State Capitol, and provides routes to Santa Fe and Broadway Avenues. I-235 reaches its northern terminus at a four level partial-stack/partial-cloverleaf interchange with I-44 and Oklahoma State Highway 66 (SH-66). There are additional exits here for North 50th Street and Santa Fe Avenue. The freeway continues northbound towards Edmond as the Broadway Extension and U.S. Route 77 (US 77), the latter of which runs concurrent with I-235 for its entire length. The total length of I-235 is 5.38 miles (8.66 km) and it serves Oklahoma City.

== History ==
Shortly after World War II, Downtown Oklahoma City experienced substantial cases of white flight to the nearby town of Edmond, which experienced rapid suburban sprawl. This led to the construction of the Broadway Extension, a freeway between the two towns, which was completed by the early 1970s. However, the southern terminus ended in a residential area near Northwest 36th Street and North Robinson Avenue, causing problems due to large traffic volumes. By 1972 city officials began conceptualizing an extension of the freeway (referred to as the "Central Expressway") south to the I-35 and I-40 interchange. The Oklahoma Department of Highways was unable to fund the project at the time; the Oklahoma Turnpike Authority also considered building it as a toll road, but determined it not to be a feasible project to subsidize without additional backing.

Towards the middle of the decade, the $65 million Central Expressway, which would meet Interstate Highway standards, was also proposed to the Federal Highway Administration (FHWA), who initially rejected it due to lack of money at the time. A few months later, it was presented to the FHWA again, this time with the modification that it would be given an I-35 designation, which at the time was routed farther east, and also continue northward to the Interstate 240 junction as well. These plans were approved in 1976, with the FHWA covering approximately ninety percent of the necessary money, and deciding to ultimately designate the 3.2-mile freeway as I-235 instead. Additional bond issues were also put forth to allow relocatation Broadway Avenue and connection of the freeway to the Oklahoma Health Center. The Oklahoma Highway Commission opted to add it to the Oklahoma State Highway system, the route also carries an alignment of U.S. Route 77.

Route planning began the following year and four options were submitted to the Oklahoma City Council, all four featuring higher than planned costs with the two cheapest routes costing $82 million and $97 million, the former of which was suggested by the planning commission. Transportation officials faced issues prior to acquiring the required right of way from concerned citizens in relation to civil rights, prompting lawsuits that delayed the project for over a year. This, along with high inflation rates caused considerable price increases to $100 million in 1978 and $164 million in July 1980. Agreements were finally reached with the residents a month later; this allowed the drafting of design plans to begin in six months with construction estimated to begin in 1983.

The FHWA approved a final route for the Central Expressway in May 1981. Engineering work began that year with construction contracts and clearing the right of way in progress the next. A decade after planning began, work on the first phase started in June 1983, from Northwest 36th to Northwest 26th Street. This stage was completed faster than expected, providing freeway access from the then-redesignated Interstate 44 (I-44) to Northwest 23rd Street, and opened on August 24, 1984. Further contracts were awarded the following year, followed by seven more construction phases, the last of which began in late-1987. Officials estimated a completion by 1989, this prompted the transportation department to rename it the "Centennial Expressway" to coincide with the centenary of the Land Rush of 1889.

In July 1988, eighty-five percent of the construction had been completed; landscaping had begun by the end of the year. The full roadway opened on April 22, 1989, although some signage and more landscaping continued in the following months. Within six months, the roadway was averaging 60,000 cars per day, with some traffic diverting from I-35 and I-44. The final cost of the entire project was $153 million, making it the most-expensive Oklahoma-built highway at the time. Beginning in 2011, further construction commenced to modernize the remainder of the roadway north of 36th Street, to its terminus at the I-44 interchange. This $241 million project was finished on March 3, 2022, and introduced Oklahoma's first partial stack interchange. It allowed for two flyover ramps to be built in place of those from the previous cloverleaf design, that had since doubled its maximum daily traffic volume.

== Exit list ==
The entire route is in Oklahoma City, Oklahoma County.

mi	km	Exit	Destinations	Notes
0.00	0.00	—	I-35 south / US 77 south / US 62 west – Dallas	Southern terminus; southern end of US-77 concurrency; unnumbered I-35 exit, freeway continues south as I-35
0.00	0.00	125C	Oklahoma City Boulevard	Exit number based on I-35 mileposts; northbound left exit only
0.00	0.00	1A	I-35 north / I-40 east / US 62 east / US 270 east – Wichita, Ft. Smith	Southbound left exit and northbound entrance, Northbound exit and Southbound entrance unnumbered via I-35; I-35 exit 126
0.00	0.00	1B	I-40 west / US 270 west – Amarillo	I-40 exit 151B
0.43	0.69	1C	Sheridan Avenue – Downtown	Northbound exit only
0.43	0.69	1C	Oklahoma City Boulevard	Southbound exit only, westbound access via I-40 exit 151A; northbound access via I-35 exit 125C, entrance access via I-40 eastbound.
0.65	1.05	1D	Lincoln Boulevard – Oklahoma Health Center, State Capitol	Northbound exit and southbound entrance
1.13	1.82	1E	Harrison Avenue / N. 10th Street	No southbound exit; access to Oklahoma City National Memorial
1.13	1.82	1F	N. 6th Street – Downtown	No northbound exit
1.40	2.25	1G	N. 10th Street – Oklahoma Health Center	Southbound exit and northbound entrance
2.32	3.73	2	N. 23rd Street / Santa Fe Avenue / Broadway Avenue – State Capitol	
3.53	5.68	3	N. 36th Street	
5.05	8.13	4A–B	I-44 (SH-66) / Santa Fe Avenue / N. 50th Street – Lawton, Tulsa	Signed as exits 4A (to I-44 west) and 4B (to I-44 east); I-44 exit 127A; northbound exits and southbound entrances, southbound exits and northbound entrances unnumbered via US-77
5.38	8.66	—	US 77 north – Edmond	Northern terminus; freeway continues north as US 77
1.000 mi = 1.609 km; 1.000 km = 0.621 mi: Concurrency terminus; Incomplete access
