= Oklahoma Health Center =

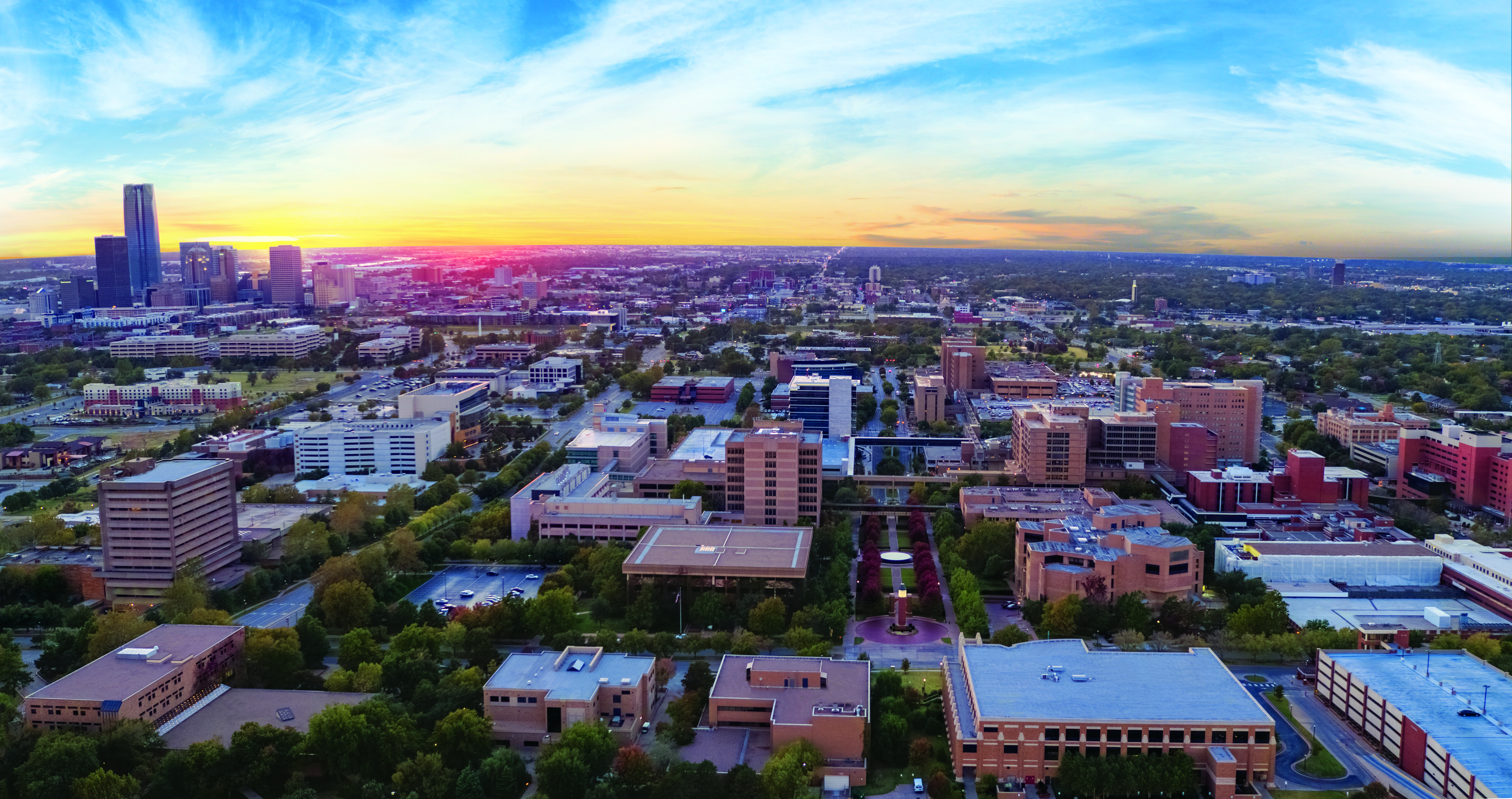
Aerial view of the Oklahoma Health Center, with downtown Oklahoma City in the background.

The Oklahoma Health Center is a 325-acre medical district in Oklahoma City, Oklahoma, located one mile northeast of downtown Oklahoma City and just south of the Oklahoma State Capitol, near the confluence of Interstates 35, 40, and 235. Over 30 organizations are members of the Oklahoma Health Center Foundation.

The health center has multiple medical, research, and educational institutions, with around 8 million square feet of floor space. It has over 12,000 employees and 4,000 students, and an economic impact of over $3 billion. OU Health forms a large part of the health center's many clinics and services. The Oklahoma Health Center is part of the larger and newly formed Innovation District.

== Healthcare Institutions ==
- Dean McGee Eye Institute
- Oklahoma Allergy & Asthma Clinic
- Oklahoma City VA Hospital
- Oklahoma Blood Institute
- OU Health
  - Harold Hamm Diabetes Center
  - Oklahoma Children's Hospital
  - OU Medical Center
  - OU Health Physicians
  - Stephenson Cancer Center

== Research & Educational Institutions ==
- ARL Bio Pharma
- DNA Solutions
- University of Oklahoma Health Sciences Center
  - College of Allied Health
  - College of Dentistry
  - College of Medicine
  - College of Nursing
  - College of Pharmacy
  - College of Public Health
  - Graduate College
- Oklahoma Medical Research Foundation

== History ==
Today's Oklahoma Health Center was founded in 1917 when the Oklahoma Legislature set aside 16.6 acres of land for the University of Oklahoma School of Medicine. The first building to be built was the University Hospital in 1919, present-day location of the College of Public Health.

Establishment of the Oklahoma Health Center began in 1964 when the city of Oklahoma City created an urban renewal plan in response to the poor and overcrowded state of medical and educational facilities. A group of city leaders visited Texas Medical Center in Houston, Texas in 1965. Inspired by the MD Anderson Foundation, which established the development of Texas Medical Center, the Oklahoma Health Sciences Foundation was founded later in 1965 to guide development of the health center in Oklahoma City.
