= Oklahoma City Boulevard =

- Interactive map of Oklahoma City Boulevard
- Former name: Crosstown Boulevard
- Maintained by: City of Oklahoma City
- Location: Oklahoma City, Oklahoma, United States
- Coordinates: 35.4654°N 97.5325°W
- West end: I-40 / US 270 in Oklahoma City
- East end: I-40 / US 270 in Oklahoma City

Construction
- Construction start: 2011; 15 years ago
- Completed: August 19, 2019; 7 years ago

The Oklahoma City Boulevard (formerly Crosstown Boulevard) is an urban thoroughfare in Oklahoma City, Oklahoma, U.S. The highway makes use of the former right of way of Interstate 40 (I-40) which was relocated to the south along a former rail alignment due to increased traffic and visible wear on parts of the freeway. A $85 million project by the Oklahoma Department of Transportation (ODOT) with funds from the U.S. Department of Transportation began construction in 2011.

== History ==
=== Controversy ===
The Oklahoma City Boulevard plan became controversial when the full extent of ODOT's original intended design became public during an Oklahoma City Streetcar meeting. At that meeting, ODOT Division Director Paul Green explained ODOT's intent for a thoroughfare design rather than a traditional urban street type boulevard. No previsions were presented by Green or ODOT representatives to accommodate the planned streetcar system approved by voters. Oklahoma City Streetcar Subcommittee member Jeff Bezdek was incensed by the plans and the lack of awareness by ODOT as to streetcar project. Bezdek was approached by Bob Kemper, a local transportation advocate and former ODOT employee about forming a citizens group to force further public review of the project. Bezdek conceived the name Friends for a Better Boulevard and suggested that Kemper organize a group under that title on Facebook to harness online civic support to demand a proper environmental review. Friends for a Better Boulevard (FBB) launched its campaign as a Facebook Group and via the popular Oklahoma City blog, OKC TALK. The group grew quickly to over six hundred active members and demanded that local leaders apply further review to the boulevard project. After much debate, the Federal Highway Administration stepped into the process and required ODOT to put the project under an Environmental Assessment to determine if a full-fledged Environmental Impact Study should be required. The state transportation agency developed three initial alternatives for consideration and evaluation. The slate was further expanded to four.

=== Construction ===
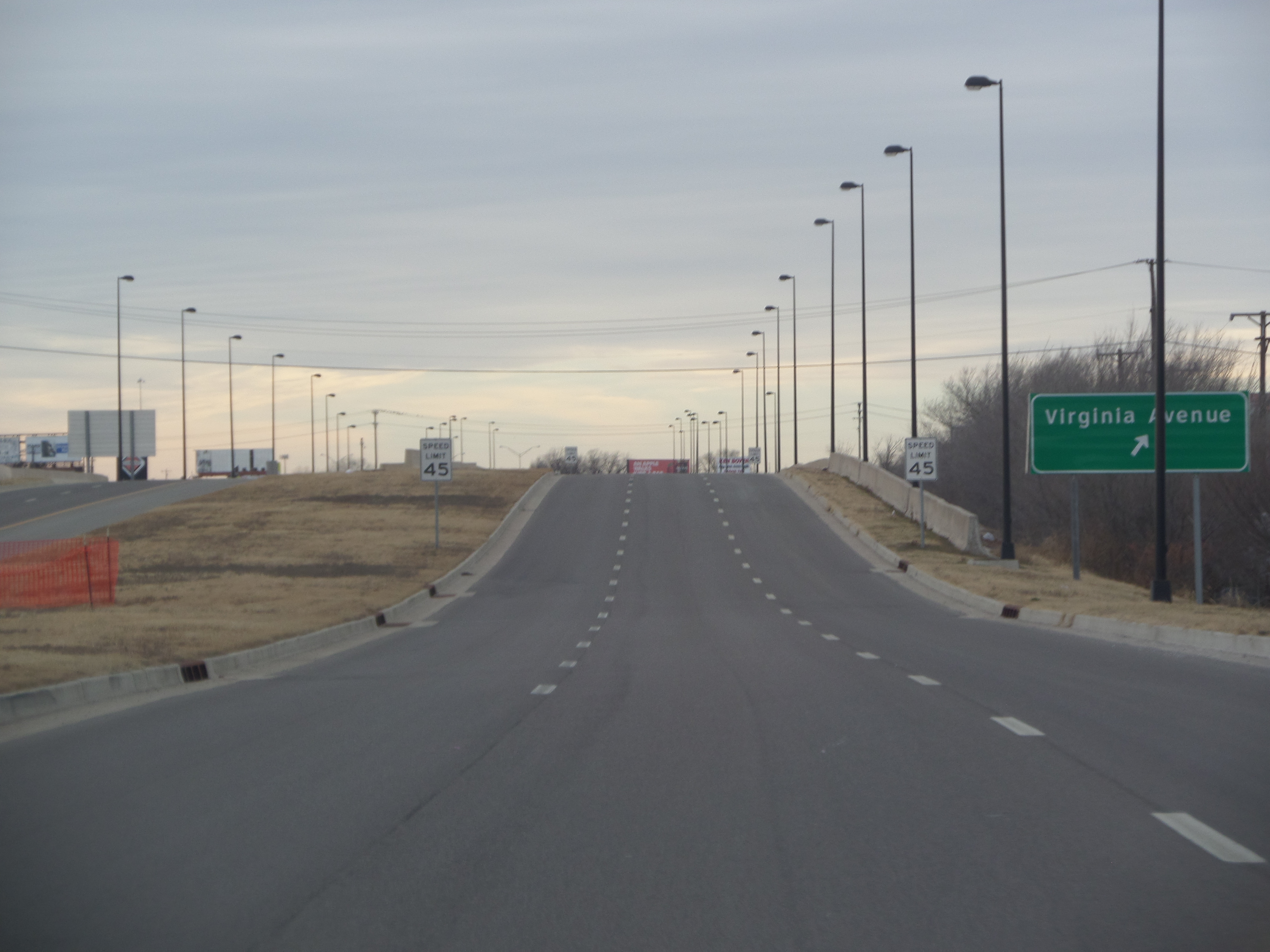
The old I-40 now Oklahoma City Boulevard at the western section approaching Virginia Avenue traveling westbound in Oklahoma City as seen in 2017

The Federal Highway Administration is awaiting submissions from ODOT for further review. Friends for a Better Boulevard has formally requested that earlier traffic modeling conducted by ODOT be reprocessed to thoroughly vet the alternatives. As of October 1, 2016, the highway is open to traffic from I-40/US-270 to Klein Avenue. On October 28, 2016, the east section from I-35 & I-40 opened to E.K. Gaylord. Oklahoma City Boulevard officially opened on August 19, 2019.

== Major intersections ==
The entire route is in Oklahoma City, Oklahoma County. All exits are unnumbered.

| mi | km | Destinations | Notes |
|---|---|---|---|
| 0.00 | 0.00 | I-40 west / US 270 west to I-44 / SH-3 – Amarillo, Lawton, Tulsa | Interchange; western terminus; I-40 exit 148B |
| 0.7 | 1.1 | Virginia Avenue | Interchange; westbound exits onto Lindley Avenue |
| 1.5 | 2.4 | Klein Avenue | |
| | | Reno Avenue | No access to or from Reno Avenue |
| | | Shartel Avenue | |
| | | Lee Avenue | |
| | | Walker Avenue | |
| | | Hudson Avenue | East end of west expressway portion |
| | | Harvey Avenue | |
| | | Thunder Drive / Robinson Avenue | |
| 2.7 | 4.3 | E.K. Gaylord Boulevard / Shields Boulevard | West end of east expressway portion |
| | | Oklahoma Avenue | |
| 3.3 | 5.3 | I-40 east / US 270 east – Fort Smith | Interchange; eastbound exit and westbound entrance; I-40 exit 151A; I-35 exit 125C; I-235 exit 1C |
| 3.4 | 5.5 | Lincoln Boulevard | Eastern terminus; road continues as SE 5th Street |
1.000 mi = 1.609 km; 1.000 km = 0.621 mi: Incomplete access
