= List of United States tornadoes in May 2010 =

This is a list of all tornadoes that were confirmed by local offices of the National Weather Service in the United States in May 2010.

== United States yearly total ==
Confirmed tornadoes by Enhanced Fujita rating
EFU	EF0	EF1	EF2	EF3	EF4	EF5	Total
0	768	342	127	32	13	0	1,282

== May ==
Confirmed tornadoes by Enhanced Fujita rating
EFU	EF0	EF1	EF2	EF3	EF4	EF5	Total
0	173	72	35	6	3	0	304

Note: 15 tornadoes were confirmed in the final totals, but do not have a listed rating.

=== May 1 event ===
List of confirmed tornadoes – Saturday, May 1, 2010 (Note: All dates are based on the local time zone where the tornado touched down; however, all times are in Coordinated Universal Time for consistency.)
EF#	Location	County / Parish	State	Start Coord.	Time (UTC)	Path length	Max width	Summary
EF0	N of Hamlin	Calloway	KY	36.6314°N 88.1843°W	08:02–08:12	6.04 mi (9.72 km)	75 yd (69 m)	Approximately 50 trees were snapped or uprooted.
EF1	SE of Cotton Plant to NNW of Dumas	Union, Tippah	MS	34.5775°N 88.9967°W	18:34–18:47	10.34 mi (16.64 km)	200 yd (180 m)	The tornado touched down in Union County, inflicting minor damage to an outbuilding. In Tippah County, six homes sustained minor to moderate damage, a roof was peeled off a mobile home, a barn, a few vehicles, and a church were damaged, and many trees were felled.
EF0	NE of Loretto	Lawrence	TN	35.0963°N 87.4329°W	21:23–21:26	3.11 mi (5.01 km)	100 yd (91 m)	A couple dozen trees were uprooted, a few trees were snapped, and a home suffered minor roof damage.
EF1	SE of Artesian	Calhoun, Bradley	AR	33.3128°N 92.3858°W	23:41–23:45	2.82 mi (4.54 km)	35 yd (32 m)	The tornado began in Calhoun County before entering Bradley County. Trees and tree limbs were blown down on timber lands in both counties.
EF1	S of Herbine	Cleveland	AR	33.7686°N 92.0312°W	00:27–00:28	0.46 mi (0.74 km)	50 yd (46 m)	Numerous trees were felled.
EF0	W of Bivins	Cass	TX	33.0118°N 94.2°W	01:29–01:31	0.91 mi (1.46 km)	150 yd (140 m)	Many trees were uprooted, numerous tree limbs were downed, about seven homes sustained minor roof and siding damage, and a church sustained minor roof damage.
EF1	Primrose area	Woodruff, Cross	AR	35.1853°N 91.0762°W	01:55–02:05	8.66 mi (13.94 km)	200 yd (180 m)	The tornado began in Woodruff County, removing a portion of a roof from a flying service hangar and causing a wall to cave in. Portions of two walls were removed from a home and its roof was partially removed. In Cross County, three homes sustained various degrees of damage, several outbuildings were damaged, and a two-story barn was completely collapsed. Trees, power poles, and power lines were snapped or felled in both counties.
EF1	E of Harrisburg	Poinsett	AR	35.5222°N 90.6177°W	02:36–02:40	6.21 mi (9.99 km)	400 yd (370 m)	A tractor disc was moved, and several transmission lines, trees, and power poles were damaged. An office trailer was destroyed, a crop duster hangar and a home were damaged, and a barn was destroyed.
EF0	N of Prescott	Nevada	AR	33.859°N 93.388°W	02:47–02:48	1.68 mi (2.70 km)	75 yd (69 m)	Several tree limbs were snapped, and a tree top was twisted off.
EF0	W of Caraway	Craighead	AR	35.7506°N 90.4266°W	02:58–02:59	0.03 mi (0.048 km)	25 yd (23 m)	A tornado was photographed by an eyewitness.
EF0	WSW of Hendrickson	Butler	MO	36.874°N 90.579°W	03:00–03:01	0.47 mi (0.76 km)	175 yd (160 m)	Several large trees were downed.
EF1	Millington	Shelby	TN	35.3228°N 89.9383°W	03:47–03:48	0.61 mi (0.98 km)	100 yd (91 m)	Several trees and a couple of wooden poles were downed and twisted.

=== May 2 event ===
List of confirmed tornadoes – Sunday, May 2, 2010
EF#	Location	County / Parish	State	Start Coord.	Time (UTC)	Path length	Max width	Summary
EF2	NW of Jordan to SE of Clinton	Fulton, Hickman	KY	36.5222°N 89.0553°W	06:05–06:25	12.46 mi (20.05 km)	600 yd (550 m)	In Fulton County, trees and limbs were downed, houses and outbuildings sustained minor damage, and a mobile home was moved a few feet with its roof peeled back. A boat on a trailer was flipped over, and anchored television antennae were pulled from the ground and bent. In Hickman County, several pole barns were damaged or destroyed, large trees were snapped or uprooted, several homes and their attendant carports sustained various degrees of damage, and a two-story garage was destroyed.
EF0	W of Nesbit	DeSoto	MS	34.8759°N 90.0442°W	06:10–06:12	1.08 mi (1.74 km)	100 yd (91 m)	Several large trees were downed, including a couple that were snapped, and shingle damage was observed.
EF1	ENE of Pope	Panola	MS	34.2432°N 89.8904°W	06:42–06:43	0.11 mi (0.18 km)	30 yd (27 m)	Trees were snapped, power lines were downed, a dumpster was overturned, and bolted-down playground equipment was tossed.
EF0	NE of Mayfield	Graves	KY	36.7613°N 88.5263°W	06:47–06:50	2.35 mi (3.78 km)	40 yd (37 m)	A small wooden shed was demolished, with debris tossed outward up to 90 yd (82 m). Trees and tree limbs were snapped, downed, or uprooted.
EF0	SE of Gadsden	Crockett	TN	35.7736°N 88.9905°W	07:14–07:15	0.02 mi (0.032 km)	25 yd (23 m)	Many trees were snapped.
EF2	E of Humboldt	Gibson	TN	35.8088°N 88.9066°W	07:20–07:25	3.04 mi (4.89 km)	200 yd (180 m)	Numerous trees were damaged, snapped, or uprooted, and several power poles and power lines were downed. Numerous homes sustained various degrees of damage, and a carport, two medal sheds, and a wooden swing set were all completely destroyed. A tour bus was lifted and turned, and a semi-trailer was flipped over.
EF3	SSW of Ashland, MS to E of Pocahontas, TN	Benton (MS), Tippah (MS), Hardeman (TN), McNairy (TN)	MS, TN	34.8008°N 89.1893°W	07:48–08:18	29.58 mi (47.60 km)	880 yd (800 m)	3 deaths – A long-lived and significant tornado began in Benton County, Mississippi, inflicting minor damage to 23 homes, causing major damage to 6 homes, and completely destroying 11 homes. A transmission tower collapsed and was severely twisted. In Tippah County, Mississippi, numerous homes were damaged and five were destroyed. After crossing the state line into Hardeman County, Tennessee, the tornado completely destroyed 2 mobile homes and a house, inflicted major damage to 13 homes, and caused minor damage to 5 houses and 2 mobile homes. It dissipated in McNairy County. In all four counties, numerous trees were snapped, downed, or debarked, and numerous power poles were downed. The tornado resulted in three fatalities, two in Benton County and a third in Hardeman County; all were occupants in destroyed mobile homes.
EF2	NW of Crofton	Christian	KY	37.0571°N 87.5981°W	07:49–08:00	9.54 mi (15.35 km)	300 yd (270 m)	The tornado leveled a garage, severely damaged or destroyed three mobile homes, and inflicted moderate to major damage to two mobile homes. Several barns received minor to moderate damage, and hundreds of trees were snapped or uprooted.
EF0	White Plains area	Hopkins	KY	37.1382°N 87.4°W	08:04–08:05	0.53 mi (0.85 km)	75 yd (69 m)	A barn was blown down, a mobile home was moved slightly with a portion of its roof removed, and several trees and tree limbs were felled.
EF0	W of Ramer	McNairy	TN	35.0787°N 88.7365°W	08:20–08:21	0.16 mi (0.26 km)	50 yd (46 m)	Several trees were felled, and a mobile home sustained minor roof damage.
EF2	SW of Selmer to W of Lebanon	McNairy, Hardin	TN	35.1184°N 88.6892°W	08:24–08:58	25.74 mi (41.42 km)	880 yd (800 m)	The tornado began in McNairy County, moving across the county and impacting parts of Selmer and Milledgeville. A large house and a mobile home were moved off their foundations, a trailer was destroyed, several buildings were collapsed, and a barn and two churches were destroyed. Overall, 22 houses and 15 mobile homes were completely destroyed, 59 houses and 11 mobile homes sustained major damage, and 219 houses and 12 mobile homes experienced minor damage. Several other buildings or outbuildings were damaged or destroyed. In Hardin County, a house sustained major damage while roof damage was inflicted to a second, and a shed sustained minor damage. In both counties, numerous trees were downed, some of which caused damage to structures.
EF2	Abbeville	Lafayette	MS	34.4891°N 89.5129°W	08:27–08:29	1.43 mi (2.30 km)	75 yd (69 m)	1 death – A single family home was destroyed, killing an occupant, a mobile home was destroyed, three other homes sustained major damage, and numerous trees were uprooted.
EF0	N of Cedar Grove	Henderson, Decatur	TN	35.4984°N 88.2825°W	09:13–09:22	5.7 mi (9.2 km)	100 yd (91 m)	The tornado began in Henderson County, Tennessee before dissipating in Decatur County. An outbuilding and building sustained roof damage, five homes were damaged, and several trees were knocked down.
EF1	S of Lobelville	Perry	TN	35.6989°N 87.8503°W	09:45–09:56	6.93 mi (11.15 km)	250 yd (230 m)	Hundreds of trees were snapped or uprooted, a home sustained minor roof damage, and a few outbuildings were destroyed.
EF2	WNW of Centerville	Perry, Hickman	TN	35.7911°N 87.6977°W	10:00–10:12	9.15 mi (14.73 km)	600 yd (550 m)	Thousands of trees were snapped or uprooted, a brick home sustained considerable structural damage, and several barns were destroyed.
EF2	W of Wrigley	Hickman	TN	35.8921°N 87.5126°W	10:17–10:22	3.89 mi (6.26 km)	250 yd (230 m)	Hundreds of trees were snapped, a brick home sustained significant roof damage, and several barns were destroyed.
EF1	N of Nashville	Davidson	TN	36.2867°N 86.7464°W	11:07–11:12	3.64 mi (5.86 km)	300 yd (270 m)	Several trailers sustained roof and underpinning damage, an old building and other structures had their roofs uplifted or removed, power poles and business signs were blown over, and hundreds of trees were snapped. Several large projectiles impacted the Rivergate Mall, leaving craters in the facade.
EF1	NNW of Hendersonville	Sumner	TN	36.3308°N 86.6444°W	11:17–11:27	5.05 mi (8.13 km)	400 yd (370 m)	Hundreds of trees were snapped and several structures sustained roof damage, including an old home that was lifted partially off its foundation.
EF1	NW of Primm Springs	Hickman	TN	35.8374°N 87.2672°W	11:45–11:47	2.73 mi (4.39 km)	50 yd (46 m)	Numerous trees were snapped and uprooted.
EF0	Tompkinsville	Monroe	KY	36.7°N 85.7576°W	13:35–13:37	5.7 mi (9.2 km)	50 yd (46 m)	A tobacco barn and several trees were damaged.
EF2	WNW of Delta	Wayne	KY	36.8855°N 84.73°W	20:25–20:30	0.25 mi (0.40 km)	100 yd (91 m)	Numerous trees were felled and the roof was blown off a brick home, resulting in the collapse of an outside wall corner.

=== May 3 event ===
List of confirmed tornadoes –Monday, May 3, 2010
EF#	Location	County / Parish	State	Start Coord.	Time (UTC)	Path length	Max width	Summary
EF0	S of Buck Stand	Abbeville	SC	34.26°N 82.381°W	13:02–13:03	1.09 mi (1.75 km)	75 yd (69 m)	A camper was shifted 10 ft (3.0 m) into a storage building, minor roof damage occurred to a home, part of a barn’s roof was peeled off and several trees were snapped or uprooted.
EF1	N of Feasterville	Fairfield	SC	34.5067°N 81.3739°W	14:26–14:31	4.22 mi (6.79 km)	200 yd (180 m)	Numerous trees were downed and some minor damage occurred to a home and outbuildings.
EF0	ENE of Browns Crossing to northern Milledgeville	Baldwin	GA	33.0637°N 83.3343°W	18:02–18:15	7.83 mi (12.60 km)	75 yd (69 m)	Several large hardwood trees were either snapped or uprooted at the start of the path. A portion of a metal roof was ripped off one side of a home and tossed into the neighboring trees. Sporadic tree damage occurred throughout much of its path. Before the tornado lifted, a porch was ripped off the side of one home and scattered about the adjacent woods. The adjacent home suffered minor to moderate roof damage. Several trees in the area were either uprooted or snapped. Several large hardwood trees were downed just west of the Milledgeville Country Club's maintenance facility, where the tornado appeared to lift.

=== May 4 event ===
List of confirmed tornadoes –Tuesday, May 4, 2010
EF#	Location	County / Parish	State	Start Coord.	Time (UTC)	Path length	Max width	Summary
EF1	SE of Zittau to W of Winchester	Winnebago	WI	44.195°N 88.738°W	00:10–00:12	0.7 mi (1.1 km)	100 yd (91 m)	Numerous pine trees were snapped, a gazebo was thrown into a house and a hundred year old barn was destroyed.
EF0	SSW of Winchester to NNW of Larsen	Winnebago	WI	44.17°N 88.687°W	00:13–00:17	3.4 mi (5.5 km)	100 yd (91 m)	Several structures were damaged or destroyed, including a shed, a house, a trailer and a garage.

=== May 7 event ===
List of confirmed tornadoes –Friday, May 7, 2010
EF#	Location	County / Parish	State	Start Coord.	Time (UTC)	Path length	Max width	Summary
EF1	E of Cloverdale to SE of New Rochester	Wood	OH	41.3258°N 83.5346°W	23:35–23:40	2.51 mi (4.04 km)	100 yd (91 m)	Five barns were leveled, several homes sustained roof damage and two grain bins were destroyed. Many trees and limbs were downed along the tornado’s path.

=== May 10 event ===
List of confirmed tornadoes – Monday, May 10, 2010 (Note: All dates are based on the local time zone where the tornado touched down; however, all times are in Coordinated Universal Time for consistency.)
EF#	Location	County / Parish	State	Coord.	Time (UTC)	Path length	Max width	Summary
EF1	NE of Marienthal	Wichita	KS	38.4878°N 101.2062°W	18:27–21:31	0.89 mi (1.43 km)	25 yd (23 m)	A small shed was destroyed.
EF0	NNE of Marienthal	Wichita	KS	38.555°N 101.1992°W	18:31–18:41	1.34 mi (2.16 km)	25 yd (23 m)	Tornado remained over open country with no damage.
EF0	SSW of Russell Springs	Logan	KS	38.8162°N 101.2421°W	18:50–18:55	1.63 mi (2.62 km)	25 yd (23 m)	Tornado remained over open country with no damage.
EF0	NNE of Grigston	Scott	KS	38.5009°N 100.7045°W	19:00–19:01	0.07 mi (0.11 km)	25 yd (23 m)	Tornado remained over open country with no damage.
EF0	S of Russell Springs	Logan	KS	38.8102°N 101.1443°W	19:18–19:22	2.18 mi (3.51 km)	25 yd (23 m)	Tornado remained over open country with no damage.
EF0	W of Elkader	Logan	KS	38.7805°N 101.0555°W	19:22–19:25	1.28 mi (2.06 km)	25 yd (23 m)	Tornado remained over open country with no damage.
EF0	SSW of Arnold	Ness	KS	38.58°N 100.08°W	20:08–20:09	0.3 mi (0.48 km)	25 yd (23 m)	Tornado remained over open country with no damage.
EF0	SW of Wakita	Grant	OK	36.793°N 98.062°W	20:33	0.5 mi (0.80 km)	20 yd (18 m)	Tornado remained over open country with no damage.
EF3	SW of Wakita, OK to S of Renfrow, OK to E of Hunnewell, KS	Grant (OK), Kay (OK), Sumner (KS)	OK, KS	36.808°N 98.031°W	20:38–21:30	40.66 mi (65.44 km)	1,500 yd (1,400 m)	Began as a multiple vortex tornado near Wakita; developed into a large, long‑track wedge tornado. Severe damage was caused to two houses, of which, at least one was destroyed. An anchored mobile home was destroyed, and a large home had its top floor completely demolished, with the main structure nearly destroyed, injuring one person. Significant tree damage followed as it moved east‑northeast, and semi‑trucks were blown over along Interstate 35 at the Kansas state line. This tornado was well documented on video in its early stages. Two people were injured.
EF0	NW of Medford	Grant	OK	36.808°N 98.031°W	20:39	0.3 mi (0.48 km)	30 yd (27 m)	Brief satellite tornado to the main Medford wedge with no damage.
EF0	SW of Zenda	Kingman	KS	37.4002°N 98.3352°W	21:12–21:15	2.73 mi (4.39 km)	125 yd (114 m)	Rope tornado remained over open country with no damage.
EF1	NW of Braman	Grant, Kay	OK	36.919°N 97.528°W	21:15–21:23	5 mi (8.0 km)	500 yd (460 m)	Numerous trees and power poles were snapped.
EF1	N of Braman	Kay	OK	36.976°N 97.317°W	21:17–21:26	6.7 mi (10.8 km)	400 yd (370 m)	One house sustained significant roof damage and two semi‑trucks were blown off Interstate 35 south of the Kansas state line.
EF0	N of Nardin	Kay	OK	36.9°N 97.449°W	21:21–21:22	0.75 mi (1.21 km)	50 yd (46 m)	Anticyclonic tornado damaged a few trees and power poles.
EF2	SE of Belmont	Kingman	KS	37.4997°N 97.9898°W	21:34–21:42	3.14 mi (5.05 km)	700 yd (640 m)	A house had its roof torn off and two exterior walls blown out, while several others sustained lesser damage from this large tornado. Two garages were also destroyed, with debris and a lawnmower being carried 100 yards downstream.
EF1	N of Norwich	Kingman	KS	37.5193°N 97.8367°W	21:44–21:49	1.83 mi (2.95 km)	300 yd (270 m)	Damage limited to uprooted trees.
EF0	Cashion area	Canadian, Kingfisher, Logan	OK	35.723°N 97.745°W	21:46–21:54	6.9 mi (11.1 km)	30 yd (27 m)	Numerous outbuildings, trees, and power poles were damaged.
EF0	NE of Union City	Canadian	OK	35.439°N 97.911°W	21:46–21:52	4 mi (6.4 km)	30 yd (27 m)	Tornado confirmed by KWTV coverage with no damage.
EF1	E of Arkansas City (first tornado)	Cowley	KS	37.0724°N 97.0313°W	21:49–21:58	1.36 mi (2.19 km)	300 yd (270 m)	A bait shop and a storage shed were damaged.
EF0	NE of Red Rock	Noble	OK	36.479°N 97.173°W	21:53–21:54	0.5 mi (0.80 km)	20 yd (18 m)	Brief tornado with no damage.
EF1	N of Viola	Sedgwick	KS	37.5854°N 97.6434°W	21:58–22:07	5.09 mi (8.19 km)	300 yd (270 m)	Tornado was confirmed by spotters, and remained on the ground near Wichita Mid-Continent Airport. At least one house was damaged.
EF1	E of Marland to S of Burbank	Noble, Osage	OK	36.539°N 97.07°W	22:00–21:25	21 mi (34 km)	2,460 yd (2,250 m)	1.4 mi (2.3 km) wide wedge tornado damaged several houses and destroyed several barns and outbuildings.
EF1	SE of Marland	Noble	OK	36.50°N 97.07°W	22:02–22:03	1.5 mi (2.4 km)	40 yd (37 m)	A house and a casino sustained minor damage.
EF1	Hastings	Jefferson	OK	34.2257°N 98.1122°W	22:05–22:14	5 mi (8.0 km)	50 yd (46 m)	One house sustained severe damage as the tornado tracked onto Waurika Lake, briefly becoming a waterspout.
EF1	E of Arkansas City (second tornado)	Cowley	KS	37.0967°N 96.9703°W	22:08–22:10	0.67 mi (1.08 km)	150 yd (140 m)	Two houses were damaged and outbuildings were destroyed. Initially believed to be one tornado but later confirmed as two separate touchdowns.
EF0	SW of Grenola	Elk	KS	37.3139°N 96.5034°W	22:08–22:10	0.27 mi (0.43 km)	75 yd (69 m)	Brief tornado with no damage.
EF0	N of The Village	Oklahoma	OK	35.604°N 97.543°W	22:13	0.2 mi (0.32 km)	20 yd (18 m)	Brief tornado spotted near Quail Springs Mall by an Oklahoma City Police Department officer. Produced no damage.
EF1	NE of Bray	Stephens, Grady	OK	34.665°N 97.781°W	22:20–22:27	6.25 mi (10.06 km)	700 yd (640 m)	Anticyclonic tornado caused minor damage to a few mobile homes. Many trees, fences and power poles were also damaged.
EF4	NNE of Newcastle to S of Harrah	Cleveland, Oklahoma	OK	35.289°N 97.504°W	22:20–22:51	24 mi (39 km)	2,000 yd (1,800 m)	2 deaths - See section on this tornado – 49 people were injured.
EF1	Moore area (second tornado)	Cleveland	OK	35.312°N 97.48°W	22:22–22:27	3.75 mi (6.04 km)	250 yd (230 m)	Satellite tornado to the main Moore tornado. A few houses were damaged in the suburban area.
EF1	SE of Moore (third tornado)	Cleveland	OK	35.306°N 97.421°W	22:27	0.5 mi (0.80 km)	50 yd (46 m)	Second satellite to the main Moore tornado. Roof damage was inflicted to a few houses and a restaurant.
EF4	SSE of Norman to Lake Thunderbird to E of Pink	Cleveland, Pottawatomie	OK	35.1808°N 97.4273°W	22:32–22:59	22.25 mi (35.81 km)	880 yd (800 m)	1 death - See section on this tornado – 32 people were injured.
EF0	E of Burbank	Osage	OK	36.7°N 96.6117°W	22:33	0.1 mi (0.16 km)	75 yd (69 m)	Brief tornado with no damage.
EF1	Norman area (second tornado)	Cleveland	OK	35.1703°N 97.4498°W	22:34–22:40	5.5 mi (8.9 km)	250 yd (230 m)	Anticyclonic tornado; parallel track and possible satellite to the main Norman tornado. Minor damage to houses and trees.
EF1	W of Wayne (first tornado)	McClain	OK	34.882°N 97.424°W	22:36–22:43	4.6 mi (7.4 km)	880 yd (800 m)	Large anticyclonic tornado caused significant damage to the Mid‑America Technology Center.
EF0	W of Wayne (second tornado)	McClain	OK	34.893°N 97.433°W	22:37–22:38	0.8 mi (1.3 km)	75 yd (69 m)	Brief spin‑up satellite to the first Wayne tornado. A shed was damaged.
EF2	NE of Slaughterville to NNE of Pink	Cleveland, Pottawatomie	OK	35.118°N 97.274°W	22:39–22:59	17.35 mi (27.92 km)	440 yd (400 m)	Severe damage was inflicted to a mobile home park, with many mobile homes destroyed. A cell phone tower was mangled and the Country Boy IGA grocery store was heavily damaged. Extensive tree damage also took place. Three people were injured. Tornado generally followed the first Norman tornado.
EF0	SE of Shidler	Osage	OK	36.7419°N 96.5674°W	22:41–22:42	1 mile (1.6 km)	50 yd (46 m)	Tornado remained over open country with no damage.
EF0	WSW of Cornish	Jefferson	OK	34.1102°N 97.7454°W	22:44–22:46	1.5 miles (2.4 km)	30 yd (27 m)	Tornado remained over pastures with no damage.
EF0	NW of Pawhuska	Osage	OK	36.6854°N 96.3491°W	22:45–22:46	1 mile (1.6 km)	75 yd (69 m)	Tornado remained over open country with no damage.
EF3	SE of Newalla to NNW of Shawnee	Pottawatomie	OK	35.34°N 97.108°W	22:48–23:02	6.5 mi (10.5 km)	880 yd (800 m)	Several houses were reduced to their interior walls, and metal poles embedded in concrete were ripped from the ground. Trees were also debarked. A 80,000 pound boxcar was taken from a railway and rolled about 300 yards from where it originated. Three people were injured.
EF0	E of Loco	Stephens	OK	34.324°N 97.635°W	22:50–22:54	2 mi (3.2 km)	50 yd (46 m)	Tornado remained over open country with no damage.
EF3	SSW of Tecumseh to SE of Earlsboro to of S of Bearden	Pottawatomie, Seminole, Okfuskee	OK	35.246°N 96.984°W	22:56–23:47	37.2 mi (59.9 km)	2,200 yd (2,000 m)	Intense, 1.25 mi (2.01 km) wide tornado confirmed by the VORTEX2 team. The most severe damage occurred close to the town of Earlsboro, where a large, two‑story home was completely demolished, with only a couple of walls left standing. A pickup truck and a semi‑trailer were lofted for long distances, and seven transmission towers were toppled. The Seminole Municipal Airport had multiple hangars completely destroyed and a plane flipped by the tornado, and two nearby mobile homes were demolished. Many trees were downed or debarked along the path. 31 people were injured, some seriously.
EF2	NW of Wilson	Carter	OK	34.18°N 97.512°W	23:04–23:10	4.5 mi (7.2 km)	400 yd (370 m)	Several mobile homes were destroyed and many trees were heavily damaged.
EF3	N of Lone Grove	Carter	OK	34.245°N 97.319°W	23:22–23:34	4.9 mi (7.9 km)	400 yd (370 m)	One house and four mobile homes were destroyed and numerous other houses were damaged. Extensive tree and power line damage was observed, including to high tension poles.
EF0	SSE of Lone Grove	Carter	OK	34.188°N 97.205°W	23:25–23:26	0.5 mi (0.80 km)	30 yd (27 m)	Tornado confirmed by videotape with no damage.
EF1	SE of Okemah	Okfuskee	OK	35.3395°N 96.3089°W	23:45–00:10	14 mi (23 km)	1,000 yd (910 m)	Several houses were damaged and several outbuildings were destroyed. Damage also reported to trees and power lines.
EF0	E of Lexington	Cleveland	OK	35.02°N 97.213°W	23:52–23:54	2 mi (3.2 km)	80 yd (73 m)	Damage was limited to trees along the path.
EF1	ENE of Marietta	Love	OK	33.956°N 97.037°W	23:54–23:56	2 mi (3.2 km)	200 yd (180 m)	A country store and several outbuildings were damaged, and many trees were snapped or uprooted.
EF0	NE of Bryant	Okmulgee	OK	35.3982°N 96.0558°W	00:03–00:04	0.5 mi (0.80 km)	100 yd (91 m)	Brief tornado slightly damaged one house and a few trees.
EF2	S of Henryetta	Okmulgee	OK	35.3833°N 96.0266°W	00:04–00:22	12 mi (19 km)	1,250 yd (1,140 m)	Large wedge tornado reported on the ground in the area. A boat dock on Henryetta Lake was destroyed, along with a mobile home and an outbuilding. Damage occurred to several other houses and mobile homes, and a large swath of trees.
EF0	SE of Lebanon	Marshall	OK	33.951°N 96.888°W	00:08–00:09	0.7 mi (1.1 km)	40 yd (37 m)	Spotter‑confirmed tornado with no damage.
EF0	NW of Willis	Marshall	OK	33.919°N 96.871°W	00:15–00:16	0.63 mi (1.01 km)	40 yd (37 m)	Spotter‑confirmed tornado with no damage.
EF2	SE of Burney	McIntosh	OK	35.4028°N 95.8673°W	00:16–00:17	1.8 mi (2.9 km)	300 yd (270 m)	A barn and a mobile home were destroyed.
EF1	SE of Boley	Okfuskee	OK	35.4898°N 96.4835°W	00:17–00:35	15.5 mi (24.9 km)	650 yd (590 m)	Houses were damaged and the roof of the local police station was torn off. Major damage to trees and power poles.
EF2	SSE of Hoffman to SE of Council Hill	McIntosh	OK	35.441°N 95.814°W	00:23–00:41	13 mi (21 km)	800 yd (730 m)	Several houses and mobile homes were heavily damaged, and barns were destroyed along and near Lake Eufaula.
EF0	E of Burney	McIntosh	OK	35.4303°N 95.7911°W	00:25	0.4 mi (0.64 km)	100 yd (91 m)	Brief tornado snapped a few tree limbs.
EF1	W of Checotah	McIntosh	OK	35.4239°N 95.7757°W	00:28–00:30	2.6 mi (4.2 km)	600 yd (550 m)	Tornado reported by KOTV. Numerous trees were snapped, and a tractor was rolled.
EF1	SW of Pierce	McIntosh	OK	35.4239°N 95.7364°W	00:30–00:31	1 mi (1.6 km)	300 yd (270 m)	Trees and power poles were damaged.
EF1	Pierce	McIntosh	OK	35.4362°N 95.7177°W	00:31–00:32	0.5 mi (0.80 km)	150 yd (140 m)	Trees and power poles were damaged.
EF0	NE of Pierce	McIntosh	OK	35.4519°N 95.7008°W	00:32	0.2 mi (0.32 km)	75 yd (69 m)	Brief tornado snapped a few tree limbs.
EF1	S of Lake Eufaula to NW of Checotah	McIntosh	OK	35.4634°N 95.6807°W	00:33–00:40	6.5 mi (10.5 km)	1,100 yd (1,000 m)	Large anticyclonic tornado destroyed the local fire department building and several mobile homes. A few houses also sustained damage.
EF2	SE of Hitchita	McIntosh	OK	35.497°N 95.7354°W	00:35–00:36	1.3 mi (2.1 km)	200 yd (180 m)	A barn and a mobile home were destroyed and two houses were severely damaged. Trees and power poles were also damaged.
EF1	SE of Rentiesville	McIntosh	OK	35.5026°N 95.4784°W	00:46–00:56	6.5 mi (10.5 km)	800 yd (730 m)	A mobile home was destroyed and a house was damaged by this large wedge tornado.
EF1	NE of Shady Grove	Muskogee	OK	35.5293°N 95.3438°W	00:56–00:58	2 mi (3.2 km)	400 yd (370 m)	A couple houses lost their roofs. Extensive damage occurred to trees and power poles.
EF0	S of Mill Creek	Johnston	OK	34.362°N 96.879°W	01:05–01:09	3.5 mi (5.6 km)	80 yd (73 m)	Tornado reported by the county EMA with no damage.
EF1	NW of Gore to E of Paradise Hill	Muskogee, Sequoyah	OK	35.5722°N 95.1987°W	01:06–01:20	13 mi (21 km)	1,250 yd (1,140 m)	Large wedge tornado caused significant damage in a campground where recreational vehicles were thrown near Tenkiller Lake. Several houses were also damaged. Three people were injured.
EF1	S of Marble City	Sequoyah	OK	35.5535°N 94.8769°W	01:27–01:31	4 mi (6.4 km)	500 yd (460 m)	Damage to trees and power poles.
EF2	SW of Coleman	Johnston, Atoka	OK	34.254°N 96.432°W	01:42–01:45	1.85 mi (2.98 km)	400 yd (370 m)	Several houses sustained major damage, with others sustaining lesser damage. The U Cross Arena and Pavilion was heavily damaged.

=== May 11 event ===
List of confirmed tornadoes – Tuesday, May 11, 2010
EF#	Location	County / Parish	State	Coord.	Time (UTC)	Path length	Max width	Summary
EF0	SE of Ballville	Sandusky	OH	41.3029°N 83.1045°W	21:30–21:40	4.62 mi (7.44 km)	50 yd (46 m)	This tornado toppled numerous trees throughout its path, and barns and outbuildings suffered some sporadic damage.
EF0	WSW of Sharon	Woodward	OK	36.188°N 99.561°W	01:27	0.1 mi (0.16 km)	10 yd (9.1 m)	Brief tornado with no damage.
EF0	ENE of Fargo	Morrow	OH	40.3755°N 82.8014°W	00:58–01:02	2.05 mi (3.30 km)	50 yd (46 m)	A few homes sustained damage, and multiple trees were downed.
EF0	E of Wright to Windhorst	Ford	KS	37.781°N 99.8523°W	02:58–03:12	8.96 mi (14.42 km)	100 yd (91 m)	Trees, a roof, and a grain bin were damaged by this nighttime tornado.

=== May 12 event ===
List of confirmed tornadoes – Wednesday, May 12, 2010
EF#	Location	County / Parish	State	Coord.	Time (UTC)	Path length	Max width	Summary
EF0	SW of Galva	McPherson	KS	38.34°N 97.54°W	20:38–20:39	0.77 mi (1.24 km)	75 yd (69 m)	Tornado remained over open country.
EF0	SSW of Elyria	McPherson	KS	38.23°N 97.66°W	20:52–20:56	1.58 mi (2.54 km)	100 yd (91 m)	Tornado remained over open country.
EF0	WSW of Canton	McPherson	KS	38.3595°N 97.4728°W	21:16–21:17	0.53 mi (0.85 km)	75 yd (69 m)	Tornado remained over open country.
EF0	SW of Haven	Reno	KS	37.8292°N 97.7898°W	21:18–21:20	0.75 mi (1.21 km)	75 yd (69 m)	Tornado remained over open country.
EF0	NW of Vinson	Harmon	OK	34.9716°N 99.9474°W	23:20–23:25	2.73 mi (4.39 km)	50 yd (46 m)	Tornado remained over open country.
EF0	NNE of Towanda	Butler	KS	37.812°N 96.9931°W	01:11–23:25	1.28 mi (2.06 km)	75 yd (69 m)	Tornado remained over open pasture land.
EF1	NE of Bessie to NNE of Clinton	Washita, Custer	OK	35.414°N 98.962°W	01:21–01:35	10.4 mi (16.7 km)	50 yd (46 m)	A barn and a house were damaged, along with a few power poles.
EF0	S of Plattsburg	Clinton	MO	39.5121°N 94.47°E	04:52–04:55	0.29 mi (0.47 km)	25 yd (23 m)	Brief tornado damaged two greenhouses and several trees and power lines.

=== May 13 event ===
List of confirmed tornadoes – Thursday, May 13, 2010
EF#	Location	County / Parish	State	Coord.	Time (UTC)	Path length	Max width	Summary
EF1	SE of Milfay to NE of Slick	Creek	OK	35.7347°N 96.5499°W	09:19–09:36	20 mi (32 km)	1,000 yd (910 m)	Long‑track wedge tornado damaged numerous houses and destroyed barns and outbuildings. Extensive tree and power pole damage was also observed.
EF2	W of Sapulpa to Southeast Tulsa to SW of Fair Oaks	Creek, Tulsa	OK	35.9972°N 96.1317°W	09:43–10:04	22.7 mi (36.5 km)	500 yd (460 m)	Tornado started in Sapulpa and tracked through much of Tulsa south of downtown. Many houses and businesses were damaged, with the most significant damage occurring near U.S. Route 75.
EF1	Glenpool area	Creek, Tulsa	OK	35.9403°N 96.0619°W	09:45–09:59	14.1 mi (22.7 km)	500 yd (460 m)	Minor damage to numerous houses, businesses and trees in the mostly suburban area.
EF2	SE of Okmulgee	Okmulgee	OK	35.5942°N 95.9394°W	09:52–09:58	6 mi (9.7 km)	300 yd (270 m)	Two houses were heavily damaged and several others sustained minor damage. Barns and outbuildings were also destroyed.
EF2	SE of Oneta	Wagoner	OK	35.9991°N 95.7132°W	10:04–10:08	5.1 mi (8.2 km)	550 yd (500 m)	Two injuries occurred as one house was severely damaged. Sheds and outbuildings were destroyed and trees and power poles were knocked down.
EF2	NNW of Catoosa to Verdigris	Rogers	OK	36.2224°N 95.7481°W	10:05–10:08	5.1 mi (8.2 km)	550 yd (500 m)	Two houses sustained major damage, as did a metal building at the Port of Catoosa.
EF0	E of Catoosa	Rogers	OK	36.1647°N 95.6895°W	10:09–10:12	3.1 mi (5.0 km)	700 yd (640 m)	A barn was damaged and trees were blown down by this large but weak tornado.
EF2	SE of Inola to NNW of Chouteau	Rogers, Mayes	OK	36.1413°N 95.5111°W	10:17–10:26	8.7 mi (14.0 km)	1,000 yd (910 m)	A wood‑frame metal shop was destroyed and several houses were heavily damaged. High‑tension power poles were also knocked down. Two people were injured.
EF1	E of Hulbert	Cherokee	OK	35.93°N 95.1321°W	10:37–10:41	4 mi (6.4 km)	200 yd (180 m)	Many trees were snapped and several outbuildings were damaged.
EF1	E of Moodys	Cherokee	OK	36.03°N 94.9053°W	10:51–10:55	4 mi (6.4 km)	200 yd (180 m)	Damage limited to trees.
EF1	NNE of Copeland, OK to NNW of Tiff City, MO	Delaware, Ottawa	OK	36.6613°N 94.8252°W	11:05–11:13	8 mi (13 km)	500 yd (460 m)	Many trees were snapped or uprooted and several houses were damaged.
EF1	NW of Savoy	Washington	AR	36.1205°N 94.3553°W	11:24	0.1 mi (0.16 km)	75 yd (69 m)	Brief tornado reported by KNWA coverage. Trees were uprooted and snapped.
EF1	SSW of Monett	Barry	MO	36.908°N 93.9369°W	12:00–12:05	2.16 mi (3.48 km)	200 yd (180 m)	The tornado destroyed a casino park area in the Plymouth Hill Subdivision and a Pizza Hut restaurant.
EF0	SE of Hurley	Stone	MO	36.9155°N 93.4328°W	12:42–12:44	0.3 mi (0.48 km)	50 yd (46 m)	One house sustained minor damage and many trees were damaged.
EF0	NE of Sparta	Christian	MO	37.0117°N 93.0617°W	13:00–13:08	4.25 mi (6.84 km)	50 yd (46 m)	Many trees were downed, and at least one house was damaged.

=== May 14 event ===
List of confirmed tornadoes –Friday, May 14, 2010
EF#	Location	County / Parish	State	Start Coord.	Time (UTC)	Path length	Max width	Summary
EF1	SE of Middle Point	Van Wert	OH	40.8302°N 84.3991°W	05:47–05:49	2.1 mi (3.4 km)	150 yd (140 m)	Several oak trees were snapped or uprooted. A TV antenna tower was bent, a garage door was blown in and two wooden playsets were rolled.
EF0	NE of Ruidoso Downs	Lincoln	NM	33.3682°N 105.5493°W	16:50–16:57	0.4 mi (0.64 km)	120 yd (110 m)	At least a dozen pine trees were uprooted in the northern Sacramento Mountains. A 500-gallon diesel tank that was estimated to be half full was lifted vertically and carried at least 150 yd (140 m), and an empty box trailer was tipped on its side. There was also minor damage to a horse barn and a firetruck.
EF0	ESE of Winkler to WSW of West Odessa	Winkler, Ector	TX	31.7548°N 102.802°W	17:56–18:04	2.98 mi (4.80 km)	100 yd (91 m)	Members of the VORTEX2 and TWISTEX teams observed a tornado. No damage was reported.
EF3	SSE of Notrees	Ector	TX	31.8344°N 102.7299°W	18:15–18:28	4.28 mi (6.89 km)	500 yd (460 m)	An intense tornado blew over two type-320 pumpjacks, each weighing 71,000 lb (32,000 kg), including their concrete bases. Several power poles were also damaged
EF0	SSE of Goldsmith	Ector	TX	31.9102°N 102.5708°W	18:32–18:36	1.27 mi (2.04 km)	75 yd (69 m)	A rope tornado was observed.
EF0	N of Greenwood	Midland	TX	32°N 101.92°W	19:15–19:18	0.53 mi (0.85 km)	50 yd (46 m)	A brief tornado was reported by a trained spotter.
EF0	SSW of Stiles	Reagan	TX	31.3198°N 101.6189°W	23:35–23:37	0.71 mi (1.14 km)	75 yd (69 m)	A tornado tossed an old telephone antenna and a stack of wooden pallets. Several limbs were broken off of trees.

=== May 15 event ===
List of confirmed tornadoes –Saturday, May 15, 2010
EF#	Location	County / Parish	State	Start Coord.	Time (UTC)	Path length	Max width	Summary
EF0	Lucy	St. John the Baptist	LA	30.05°N 90.5°W	12:11	0.06 mi (0.097 km)	20 yd (18 m)	A brief, weak tornado damaged a mobile home.
EF0	NE of Nunn	Weld	CO	40.7512°N 104.7025°W	19:59	0.1 mi (0.16 km)	50 yd (46 m)	A tornado briefly touched down and did no damage.
EF0	NNE of Dover	Weld	CO	40.7699°N 104.7883°W	20:16–20:25	3.79 mi (6.10 km)	50 yd (46 m)	A tornado tracked over open country.

=== May 16 event ===
List of confirmed tornadoes –Sunday, May 16, 2010
EF#	Location	County / Parish	State	Start Coord.	Time (UTC)	Path length	Max width	Summary
EF0	NE of Hartford	Sebastian	AR	35.0405°N 94.355°W	16:30	0.1 mi (0.16 km)	50 yd (46 m)	A weak landspout tornado occurred over rural land.
EF0	NNW of Parks	Dundy	NE	40.28°N 101.83°W	21:14–21:17	0.25 mi (0.40 km)	10 yd (9.1 m)	A brief tornado was observed by law enforcement and a storm spotter.
EF0	SE of Gibbons	Dunklin	MO	36.1218°N 89.9926°W	23:13–23:14	0.8 mi (1.3 km)	25 yd (23 m)	A landspout tornado damaged farm equipment.
EF0	NNW of Preston	Pratt	KS	37.77°N 98.56°W	02:33–02:34	0.3 mi (0.48 km)	50 yd (46 m)	A brief and weak tornado occurred.
EF0	ENE of Cunningham	Kingman	KS	37.67°N 98.37°W	03:00–03:03	0.77 mi (1.24 km)	100 yd (91 m)	A tornado briefly touched down in an open field.

=== May 17 event ===
List of confirmed tornadoes –Monday, May 17, 2010
EF#	Location	County / Parish	State	Start Coord.	Time (UTC)	Path length	Max width	Summary
EF0	SSE of Rion	Fairfield	SC	34.251°N 81.097°W	22:07–22:10	0.41 mi (0.66 km)	50 yd (46 m)	A tornado was reported.

=== May 18 event ===
List of confirmed tornadoes –Tuesday, May 18, 2010
EF#	Location	County / Parish	State	Start Coord.	Time (UTC)	Path length	Max width	Summary
EF0	W of Port Isabel	Cameron	TX	26.07°N 97.22°W	13:41–13:45	0.01 mi (0.016 km)	10 yd (9.1 m)	An off-duty NWS employee observed a waterspout briefly moving ashore.
EF0	NNE of Rockport to W of Carpenter	Weld (CO), Laramie (WY)	CO, WY	40.9317°N 104.76°W	21:36–21:50	5.1 mi (8.2 km)	50 yd (46 m)	A weak but long-tracked tornado occurred over rural, uninhabited country.
EF0	S of Cheyenne	Laramie	WY	41.0866°N 104.82°W	21:41–21:45	5 mi (8.0 km)	50 yd (46 m)	A storm spotter reported a tornado.
EF0	W of Cheyenne	Laramie	WY	41.03°N 104.7154°W	21:45–21:46	5 mi (8.0 km)	50 yd (46 m)	A storm spotter observed a tornado.
EF0	SSE of Hartley	Hartley	TX	35.8265°N 102.3727°W	22:32–22:36	1.09 mi (1.75 km)	50 yd (46 m)	A tornado remained over open country.
EF0	SE of Hartley	Hartley	TX	35.7981°N 102.299°W	22:41–22:44	1.01 mi (1.63 km)	100 yd (91 m)	Members of the VORTEX2 team observed a tornado over uninhabited rural areas.
EF0	W of Dumas	Hartley, Moore	TX	35.85°N 102.1664°W	22:55–22:57	0.53 mi (0.85 km)	25 yd (23 m)	A brief tornado occurred at the Hartley-Moore county line. No damage was reported.
EF0	E of Mead	Weld	CO	40.23°N 104.91°W	23:23–23:28	0.1 mi (0.16 km)	50 yd (46 m)	A tornado did no damage.
EF0	SSW of Dumas	Moore	TX	35.8233°N 101.9837°W	23:28–23:30	2.22 mi (3.57 km)	25 yd (23 m)	A tornado occurred south of Dumas and crossed US-287 before dissiapting.
EF0	E of Dumas	Moore	TX	35.85°N 101.9343°W	23:42–23:45	1.23 mi (1.98 km)	200 yd (180 m)	Storm chasers and members of VORTEX2 observed a tornado.
EF0	SW of Bushnell	Kimball	NE	41.1788°N 103.968°W	23:48–23:50	0.25 mi (0.40 km)	25 yd (23 m)	A brief tornado touched down.
EF0	SSE of Egbert	Laramie	WY	41.1202°N 104.2298°W	00:00–00:04	1 mi (1.6 km)	25 yd (23 m)	A tornado was observed near I-80.
EF0	E of Egbert	Laramie	WY	41.17°N 104.2238°W	00:06–00:07	1 mi (1.6 km)	25 yd (23 m)	A tornado occurred over open land.
EF0	WSW of Pine Bluffs	Laramie	WY	41.17°N 104.1661°W	00:15–00:17	0.25 mi (0.40 km)	25 yd (23 m)	A brief tornado occurred alongside I-80.
EF0	W of Pine Bluffs	Laramie	WY	41.17°N 104.1661°W	00:21–00:23	0.25 mi (0.40 km)	25 yd (23 m)	The public reported a tornado.
EF0	E of Egbert	Laramie	WY	41.17°N 104.243°W	00:24–00:25	0.25 mi (0.40 km)	25 yd (23 m)	Three tornadoes were reported on the ground at the same time, however NCEI data shows only one rated.
EF2	W of Pringle	Hutchinson	TX	35.9099°N 101.4705°W	00:44–01:00	4.99 mi (8.03 km)	300 yd (270 m)	Significant damage occurred to a farm, where a large portion of the roof was removed from the residence with considerable damage to several small sheds in the vicinity. Numerous trees were stripped with many broken large branches. A pickup truck behind the residence was flipped upside down with the cab smashed. Several power poles were snapped just to the east of the residence with additional damage sustained to a few irrigation pivots. A storage bin and large fuel tank were found 500 yd (460 m) northeast of their original locations.
EF0	NW of Guymon	Texas	OK	36.8335°N 101.6716°W	00:44–00:46	0.55 mi (0.89 km)	25 yd (23 m)	A tornado remained over open country.
EF0	S of Bethune	Kit Carson	CO	39.0623°N 102.5095°W	00:50–00:54	1.55 mi (2.49 km)	25 yd (23 m)	A tornado remained over rural, open country.
EF2	Burns	Laramie	WY	41.18°N 104.37°W	00:55–01:00	1.5 mi (2.4 km)	100 yd (91 m)	A significant tornado struck Burns, removing the roof from a house.
EF0	NNW of Chivington	Kiowa	CO	38.5311°N 102.6127°W	01:21–01:26	2.34 mi (3.77 km)	75 yd (69 m)	A tornado occurred west of the Sand Creek Massacre National Historic Site. A power pole was downed, an abandoned farm house was damaged and a center-pivot irrigation system was flipped.
EF0	ENE of Ware	Dallam	TX	36.1966°N 102.6503°W	01:52–01:53	0.52 mi (0.84 km)	25 yd (23 m)	A tornado remained over open country.
EF0	W of Conlen	Dallam	TX	36.23°N 102.3735°W	02:30–02:42	4.08 mi (6.57 km)	25 yd (23 m)	A tornado tracked over rural rangeland.
EF0	W of Stratford	Sherman	TX	36.42°N 102.106°W	03:40–03:43	1.06 mi (1.71 km)	50 yd (46 m)	A tornado remained over open land, doing no known damage.
EF0	S of Texhoma	Sherman	TX	36.42°N 101.8002°W	04:27–04:31	1.4 mi (2.3 km)	880 yd (800 m)	A brief but rather large tornado remained over open country.
EF0	NNW of Gruver	Hansford	TX	36.3235°N 101.4275°W	05:12–05:14	0.55 mi (0.89 km)	25 yd (23 m)	A tornado occurred over open rangeland.

=== May 19 event ===
List of confirmed tornadoes –Wednesday, May 19, 2010
EF#	Location	County / Parish	State	Start Coord.	Time (UTC)	Path length	Max width	Summary
EF0	S of Arnett	Ellis	OK	35.896°N 99.757°W	06:22	0.5 mi (0.80 km)	50 yd (46 m)	A tornado was observed doing no damage.
EF1	SSW of Pringle	Hutchinson	TX	35.9099°N 101.4705°W	06:56–06:57	0.44 mi (0.71 km)	100 yd (91 m)	A metal barn was completely destroyed. Several large tractors suffered significant damage with their cab windows being blown out.
EF0	N of Fargo	Ellis	OK	36.435°N 99.621°W	08:15	0.5 mi (0.80 km)	30 yd (27 m)	A tornado destroyed a trailer and damaged trees and powerlines.
EF0	SSE of Farnsworth	Ochiltree	TX	36.07°N 100.82°W	08:32–08:34	1.12 mi (1.80 km)	50 yd (46 m)	A tornado remained over open country, doing no damage.
EF0	NNW of Leedey to SSW of Camargo	Dewey	OK	35.9235°N 99.3774°W	20:24–20:30	5.9 mi (9.5 km)	40 yd (37 m)	A tornado was videoed over open country. No damage occurred.
EF0	NW of Hennessey	Kingfisher	OK	36.1202°N 97.9127°W	21:41–21:48	0.1 mi (0.16 km)	50 yd (46 m)	A tornado remained nearly stationary for a couple of minutes.
EF0	E of Hennessey	Kingfisher	OK	36.11°N 97.7209°W	22:08	0.1 mi (0.16 km)	10 yd (9.1 m)	A tornado was videoed over open land.
EF0	SSE of Marshall	Logan	OK	36.1065°N 97.5926°W	22:24–22:27	1.56 mi (2.51 km)	20 yd (18 m)	A rain-wrapped tornado was videoed.
EF1	Southern Loyal to NNE of Kingfisher	Kingfisher	OK	35.97°N 98.1379°W	22:33–23:00	14 mi (23 km)	75 yd (69 m)	A tornado developed west of Loyal, where an un-anchored trailer home was destroyed and a power pole was downed. The tornado continued east into southern Loyal, where tree damage occurred. The tornado crossed US-81, blowing a truck off the road and injuring the driver. An ODOT salt barn was destroyed and some signs and fences were damaged.
EF0	SW of Ingalls	Gray	KS	37.8224°N 100.4635°W	22:48–22:51	0.24 mi (0.39 km)	30 yd (27 m)	A brief landspout occurred.
EF0	N of Charleston	Gray	KS	37.9°N 100.57°W	22:48–22:50	0.13 mi (0.21 km)	30 yd (27 m)	A landspout touched down over open land.
EF0	S of Mansfield	Finney	KS	37.88°N 100.76°W	22:55–22:58	0.44 mi (0.71 km)	50 yd (46 m)	A brief tornado kicked up dust.
EF0	NW of Charleston	Gray	KS	37.9°N 100.62°W	22:56–23:00	0.45 mi (0.72 km)	50 yd (46 m)	A rope tornado occurred over open land.
EF1	SE of Orlando to WNW of Stillwater	Payne	OK	36.12°N 97.3288°W	23:03–23:36	10.55 mi (16.98 km)	200 yd (180 m)	A tornado touched down east of I-35 and crossed over Lake Carl Blackwell. A large wooden barn was damaged, a tin roof was ripped off a home and other outbuildings were damaged. Numerous trees also were damaged.
EF0	SE of Orlando	Logan	OK	36.1295°N 97.3547°W	23:04–23:05	0.1 mi (0.16 km)	10 yd (9.1 m)	Local media videoed a brief tornado.
EF0	N of Charleston	Gray	KS	37.96°N 100.57°W	23:26–23:28	0.28 mi (0.45 km)	30 yd (27 m)	A brief tornado did no damage.
EF0	NW of Cimarron	Gray	KS	37.8133°N 100.3623°W	23:57–23:59	0.17 mi (0.27 km)	30 yd (27 m)	A brief and small tornado occurred just outside of Cimarron. No damage was reported.
EF0	E of Cimarron	Gray	KS	37.8011°N 100.3254°W	00:03–00:06	0.43 mi (0.69 km)	50 yd (46 m)	A small shed was destroyed.
EF0	ESE of Depew	Creek	OK	35.7889°N 96.467°W	00:09	0.1 mi (0.16 km)	50 yd (46 m)	A storm spotter reported and photographed a brief tornado touching down.
EF1	ENE of Bristow to SSW of Kelleyville	Creek	OK	35.8543°N 96.3242°W	00:37–00:53	5 mi (8.0 km)	600 yd (550 m)	A tornado destroyed barns, damaged homes, snapped or uprooted numerous trees and blew down power poles.
EF1	WNW of Prague	Lincoln	OK	35.5205°N 96.7803°W	01:12–01:17	1.4 mi (2.3 km)	25 yd (23 m)	An outbuilding was destroyed, a tin barn was damaged and several trees were damaged.
EF0	NE of Moses Lake	Grant	WA	47.1879°N 119.1495°W	01:15–01:20	0.23 mi (0.37 km)	100 yd (91 m)	An intermittent tornado lifted a section of roof that was unattached and tossed it 10 yd (9.1 m) from its original location onto an old barn, destroying it. A grain silo was damaged by the tornado and numerous large tree branches were also downed.
EF1	NE of Hennepin to S of Wynnewood to N of Sulphur	Garvin, Murray	OK	34.5778°N 97.2676°W	01:31–01:53	17.5 mi (28.2 km)	375 yd (343 m)	A long-track tornado touched down and did minor tree damage in Garvin County before crossing into Murray County. In Murray County, several barns and outbuildings were heavily damaged, and some homes had roof damage. Extensive tree and powerline and power pole damage also occurred.
EF1	SSW of Micawber to SSE of Welty	Okfuskee	OK	35.5775°N 96.5336°W	01:46–01:56	8 mi (13 km)	500 yd (460 m)	A tornado snapped or uprooted numerous trees.
EF1	ENE of Bearden to NNE of Clearview	Okfuskee	OK	35.3603°N 96.333°W	02:05–02:17	10 mi (16 km)	500 yd (460 m)	Homes were damaged, power poles were downed and trees were snapped or uprooted.

=== May 20 event ===
List of confirmed tornadoes –Thursday, May 20, 2010
EF#	Location	County / Parish	State	Start Coord.	Time (UTC)	Path length	Max width	Summary
EF0	WNW of Midlothian	Ellis	TX	32.4975°N 97.0261°W	19:06–19:11	1.16 mi (1.87 km)	25 yd (23 m)	A tornado occurred over open county and no damage was reported.
EF0	NE of Alma	Ellis	TX	32.3005°N 96.5258°W	20:20–20:21	0.51 mi (0.82 km)	25 yd (23 m)	An abandoned barn collapsed and uprooted and twisted a few trees.
EF0	SW of Burtville	Johnson	MO	38.66°N 93.65°W	22:45–22:46	0.16 mi (0.26 km)	25 yd (23 m)	A tornado briefly touched down in rural open country.
EF0	WSW of Sedalia	Pettis	MO	38.69°N 93.28°W	23:46–23:49	0.45 mi (0.72 km)	25 yd (23 m)	Minor roof and shingle damaged occurred to roughly a dozen homes in a subdivision.
EF0	SSE of Hubbard	Hill	TX	31.81°N 96.77°W	23:55	0.02 mi (0.032 km)	10 yd (9.1 m)	A brief tornado occurred over open land.
EF0	NW of Rainey to NNW of Moselle	Jones	MS	31.54°N 89.36°W	00:57–01:03	3.5 mi (5.6 km)	75 yd (69 m)	A number of small trees and large limbs were blown down. A windmill tower was also blown over.

=== May 21 event ===
List of confirmed tornadoes –Friday, May 21, 2010
EF#	Location	County / Parish	State	Start Coord.	Time (UTC)	Path length	Max width	Summary
EF0	S of Hume	Edgar	IL	39.7822°N 87.869°W	17:20–17:21	0.12 mi (0.19 km)	10 yd (9.1 m)	A brief tornado touched down. No damage was reported.
EF0	ESE of Mortimer	Edgar	IL	39.8456°N 87.7328°W	17:40–17:41	0.11 mi (0.18 km)	10 yd (9.1 m)	A tornado occurred over farmland.
EF1	N of White Oak to SE of Buford	Brown, Highland	OH	39.03°N 83.88°W	22:44–22:53	4.27 mi (6.87 km)	50 yd (46 m)	A section of roofing was removed from part of a home, the front porch supports of the home were lifted and removed, and a piece of wood was driven into decking material. Several other barns and outbuildings were destroyed or heavily damaged along the path. Numerous trees were also uprooted.
EF0	NNW of Wheatland	Platte	WY	42.3174°N 105.1195°W	22:59–23:01	0.25 mi (0.40 km)	20 yd (18 m)	A small rope tornado was observed by multiple storm chasers and trained spotters.
EF1	Big Springs	Breckinridge, Hardin	KY	37.8031°N 86.1709°W	00:28–00:30	1.75 mi (2.82 km)	75 yd (69 m)	An intermittent, low-end EF1 tornado damaged a large barn's roof significantly and did some wall damage. Damage also occurred to hardwood trees. As the tornado entered Hardin County, it damaged a double-wide mobile home before it lifted.
EF1	NW of Manchester to W of Bentonville	Adams	OH	38.71°N 83.65°W	00:44–00:52	2.97 mi (4.78 km)	75 yd (69 m)	A high-end EF1 heavily damaged several well constructed barns and outbuildings right as it touched down. As the tornado oddly tracked northwest, it caused significant tree damage, minor damage to homes, and significant damage to numerous barns and outbuildings. Before the tornado lifted, a house had its windows blown out and significant tree damage occurred nearby.

=== May 22 event ===
List of confirmed tornadoes –Saturday, May 22, 2010
EF#	Location	County / Parish	State	Start Coord.	Time (UTC)	Path length	Max width	Summary
EF0	S of Akaska	Walworth	SD	45.2886°N 100.1235°W	22:31–22:35	0.48 mi (0.77 km)	50 yd (46 m)	A brief tornado touched down occurred in a field.
EF1	SE of Java	Walworth	SD	45.4248°N 99.7948°W	23:16–23:18	0.5 mi (0.80 km)	100 yd (91 m)	A tornado knocked down six wooden power poles before lifting quickly.
EF4	ESE of Java to NE of Bowdle	Walworth, Edmunds	SD	45.448°N 99.7479°W	23:21–23:40	5.7 mi (9.2 km)	1,200 yd (1,100 m)	See article on this tornado - A violent tornado tore a path through northern South Dakota.
EF0	NNW of Chancellor	Pecos	TX	30.8079°N 103.2501°W	23:36–23:49	1.77 mi (2.85 km)	150 yd (140 m)	A tornado was observed by trained spotters and local law enforcement, tracking south-southeast. Minor damage was done to vegetation.
EF0	NE of Gretna	Edmunds	SD	45.48°N 99.46°W	00:10–00:12	0.28 mi (0.45 km)	30 yd (27 m)	A tornado briefly touched down near US-12. No damage occurred.
EF0	NNE of Beebe	Edmunds	SD	45.5°N 99.16°W	00:48–00:50	0.19 mi (0.31 km)	30 yd (27 m)	A tornado briefly touched down and lifted. This tornado occurred simultaneously with the tornado below.
EF0	NNE of Beebe	Edmunds	SD	45.51°N 99.15°W	00:48–00:50	0.21 mi (0.34 km)	10 yd (9.1 m)	This tornado occurred simultaneously with the tornado above. It was brief and caused no damage.
EF2	NNE of Ipswich to Wetonka to WSW of Barnard	Edmunds, McPherson, Brown	SD	45.54°N 99.01°W	01:01–01:40	18.64 mi (30.00 km)	200 yd (180 m)	A significant, long-track tornado first touched down in northeastern Edmunds County, where it tore off sections from the roof of a barn. The tornado then tracked through primarily crop and pasture land to near Deerfield Colony. Sporadic tree damage was observed along the tornado path with many wooden power poles completely sheared off as the tornado entered into McPherson County. The tornado struck a farm where a calving shed was completely destroyed with large sections of the roof blown over 100 yd (91 m). The tornado then caused moderate damage to a barn with one collapsed wall. Multiple softwood and hardwood trees were uprooted and many power poles were completely snapped near the base. The tornado tore the roof off a turkey barn at the Long Lake Colony. Several homes in Wetonka also sustained minor roof damage. The tornado then entered into western Brown County and did some tree damage before dissipating.
EF0	NW of Chancellor	Pecos	TX	30.8203°N 103.2987°W	01:15–01:16	0.25 mi (0.40 km)	150 yd (140 m)	A trained weather spotter reported a weak, brief tornado. No damage was reported.
EF1	WSW of Orient	Hyde	SD	44.87°N 99.39°W	01:26–01:29	1.62 mi (2.61 km)	100 yd (91 m)	A tornado struck a farm damaging or destroying several large barns, eighteen grain bins and the garage on a home. A grain cart was also tipped over by the tornado and twelve cattle were killed.
EF0	W of Sparks	Cherry	NE	42.9399°N 100.2736°W	01:45–01:50	1.03 mi (1.66 km)	20 yd (18 m)	A tornado touched down over an open field and traveled east where it struck a metal building tearing off a portion of the roof. The tornado destroyed a portion of a grandstand and completely demolished a concession stand before lifting.
EF2	NW of Houghton to W of Hecla	Brown	SD	45.8636°N 98.3108°W	02:10–02:13	1.29 mi (2.08 km)	100 yd (91 m)	A strong tornado tore the roof off an outbuilding and threw several grain bins over 100 yd (91 m). Widespread tree damage also occurred. Before dissipating, the tornado damaged another outbuilding and destroyed an empty grain bin.
EF2	Winner	Tripp	SD	43.3756°N 99.8664°W	02:11–02:22	2.85 mi (4.59 km)	150 yd (140 m)	A tornado tracked through Winner, blowing down carports, trees, and flipping tractor-trailers. A large barn had its curved roof blown off in one piece and tossed across a corral east of town. Another machine shed was blown apart.
EF2	ENE of Norden to NW of Burton	Keya Paha	NE	42.9429°N 99.9172°W	02:30–02:50	9.01 mi (14.50 km)	20 yd (18 m)	A tornado did extensive tree damage when it touched down, before moving northeast and striking two farmsteads. At the first farmstead, a loafing shed and stock trailer were destroyed, extensive tree and fence damage occurred, and a roof was torn off an old hog building. The most extensive damage occurred north of the farmstead where six rural power poles were broken. The tornado continued to move northeast and destroy a windmill. Then a second farmstead was hit with the tornado destroying a quonset before the tornado lifted.

=== May 23 event ===
List of confirmed tornadoes –Sunday, May 23, 2010
EF#	Location	County / Parish	State	Start Coord.	Time (UTC)	Path length	Max width	Summary
EF2	SE of Verhalen	Reeves, Pecos	TX	31.0092°N 103.4347°W	23:56–00:06	3.96 mi (6.37 km)	300 yd (270 m)	A strong tornado moved southeastward damaging 12 power poles. All but two of these poles were broken into 3 or 4 pieces each. The tornado was also photographed by a NWS employee and local law enforcement.
EF0	N of Brownsville to S of Brewster	Thomas	KS	39.2557°N 101.3645°W	01:03–01:06	2 mi (3.2 km)	25 yd (23 m)	A storm chaser reported a cone tornado.
EF1	NW of Springfield	Baca	CO	37.49°N 102.71°W	01:12–01:24	7.9 mi (12.7 km)	100 yd (91 m)	A tornado traveled an odd northwest direction, where it downed 5 power poles and moved a hay swather.
EF1	WSW of Felt	Cimarron	OK	36.5301°N 102.8998°W	01:30–01:35	2.05 mi (3.30 km)	25 yd (23 m)	A tornado remained over open country.
EF0	SE of Ruleton	Sherman	KS	39.29°N 101.84°W	01:52	0.05 mi (0.080 km)	10 yd (9.1 m)	A brief tornado was reported.
EF2	SSE of Clayton, NM to W of Felt, OK	Union (NM), Cimarron (OK)	NM, OK	36.0731°N 103.1326°W	01:52–02:47	21.96 mi (35.34 km)	440 yd (400 m)	Power lines were downed, barbed wire fences and hay bales were tossed. In addition, a steel building from a feedlot was destroyed and a semi truck was turned over on private property. The tornado crossed the New Mexico-Oklahoma state line and destroyed a steel windmill tower. Three metal feed troughs were also destroyed along with considerable fence damage before the tornado lifted.
EF0	SSE of Clayton	Union	NM	36.3571°N 103.1445°W	01:55–02:03	2.53 mi (4.07 km)	100 yd (91 m)	A weak satellite of the previous EF2 tornado was videoed.
EF1	NNE of Goodland	Sherman	KS	39.483°N 101.6225°W	02:07–02:17	6.36 mi (10.24 km)	50 yd (46 m)	A stovepipe tornado was visible from the NWS office in Goodland. An irrigation pivot was damaged and trees were downed. Several utility poles were broken.
EF1	W of Amistad	Union	NM	35.8859°N 103.194°W	02:10–02:27	5.67 mi (9.12 km)	175 yd (160 m)	A residence was damaged.
EF2	W of Sedan	Union	NM	36.1056°N 103.1659°W	02:12–02:36	8.82 mi (14.19 km)	440 yd (400 m)	A single-wide mobile home had its tie-down straps completely destroyed and the undercarriage was carried 40 yd (37 m). Agricultural equipment was also damaged.
EF0	NNE of Goodland	Sherman	KS	39.5384°N 101.5834°W	02:16–02:19	1.87 mi (3.01 km)	25 yd (23 m)	A storm chaser reported a cone tornado.
EF1	N of Sedan to SSE of Clayton	Union	NM	36.2749°N 103.1307°W	02:36–02:48	4.2 mi (6.8 km)	100 yd (91 m)	A fence was downed and a grain silo was destroyed.
EF1	E of Sedan	Union	NM	36.0731°N 103.1326°W	02:59–03:25	9.33 mi (15.02 km)	175 yd (160 m)	Minor damage was reported.

=== May 24 event ===
List of confirmed tornadoes –Monday, May 24, 2010
EF#	Location	County / Parish	State	Start Coord.	Time (UTC)	Path length	Max width	Summary
EF0	Near Kimball	Kimball	NE	41.23°N 103.67°W	17:34–17:44	0.5 mi (0.80 km)	75 yd (69 m)	A tornado was confirmed but no storm survey was performed.
EF0	NE of Scottsbluff	Scotts Bluff	NE	41.94°N 103.51°W	18:11–18:30	0.25 mi (0.40 km)	50 yd (46 m)	A tornado was reported near the Minatare Lake State Recreation Area. No survey was performed.
EF0	Near Gering	Scotts Bluff	NE	41.82°N 103.67°W	18:16–18:36	0.25 mi (0.40 km)	50 yd (46 m)	A tornado was confirmed, but no storm survey was done.
EF0	WNW of Kimball	Kimball	NE	41.2743°N 103.8123°W	18:38–18:45	0.25 mi (0.40 km)	100 yd (91 m)	Law enforcement reported a tornado near a conservation reserve project. No damage occurred.
EF2	SSE of Plainview to SSW of Faith	Meade	SD	44.53°N 102.12°W	19:24–19:57	22.25 mi (35.81 km)	440 yd (400 m)	A strong tornado damaged a manufactured home shortly after forming, tearing off its roof and blowing its walls over. The tornado also destroyed an old, abandoned house and a pole barn, and tossed a combine, a hay swather and a van.
EF1	Grafton	Walsh	ND	48.4°N 97.44°W	19:30–19:35	3 mi (4.8 km)	50 yd (46 m)	Several trees were blown down and a metal street light pole was snapped in northeastern Grafton.
EF0	ENE of Big Woods to W of Argyle	Marshall	MN	48.33°N 97.05°W	19:48–19:55	4 mi (6.4 km)	50 yd (46 m)	A tornado downed a few trees in a shelterbelt and tossed road construction signs.
EF0	SSW of Faith	Meade	SD	44.95°N 102.08°W	20:00–20:06	4.86 mi (7.82 km)	100 yd (91 m)	A tornado traveled due north causing no damage.
EF0	NW of Alliance	Box Butte	NE	42.2023°N 103.018°W	20:11–20:30	0.25 mi (0.40 km)	50 yd (46 m)	A tornado was reported by the public and relayed on KCOW. No storm survey was performed.
EF0	SSE of Valley City	Barnes	ND	46.8531°N 97.9595°W	20:29	0.1 mi (0.16 km)	10 yd (9.1 m)	A brief touchdown and debris cloud were observed by the public. The tornado remained over an open field.
EF2	SSE of Usta to S of Meadow	Perkins	SD	45.169°N 102.15°W	20:34–21:00	22.85 mi (36.77 km)	440 yd (400 m)	A tornado destroyed outbuildings on two ranches, tossed farm equipment, damaged trees and killed four calves.
EF0	NE of Halstad	Norman	MN	47.4523°N 96.6788°W	20:48–20:51	1 mi (1.6 km)	20 yd (18 m)	A tornado was viewed from a farm as it remained over open fields.
EF2	SSE of Meadow	Perkins	SD	45.4381°N 102.16°W	20:55–21:10	8.23 mi (13.24 km)	440 yd (400 m)	A rural school was destroyed.
EF0	W of Shadehill	Perkins	SD	45.4381°N 102.16°W	21:34–21:35	0.05 mi (0.080 km)	30 yd (27 m)	The manager of the Shadehill Reservoir State Recreation Area observed a brief tornado touchdown.
EF1	S of New Leipzig	Sioux, Grant	ND	46.04°N 101.98°W	23:05–23:15	1.63 mi (2.62 km)	40 yd (37 m)	A low-end EF1 damaged a roof at a farmstead.
EF0	NNW of Fort Yates	Sioux	ND	46.1546°N 100.6793°W	01:09–01:13	1.35 mi (2.17 km)	35 yd (32 m)	Minor damage occurred to fences and a trailer home.
EF0	WNW of Spearman	Hansford	TX	36.2°N 101.2717°W	01:29–01:42	3.06 mi (4.92 km)	100 yd (91 m)	A farmstead had some minor damage and large trees were downed.
EF0	W of Spearman	Hansford	TX	36.2°N 101.25°W	01:37–01:38	0.21 mi (0.34 km)	25 yd (23 m)	This tornado was a satellite of the previous tornado. It remained over open country.
EF0	NW of Spearman	Hansford	TX	36.24°N 101.24°W	01:47–01:49	0.38 mi (0.61 km)	25 yd (23 m)	A trained spotter reported an intermittent tornado as it remained over open country.
EF0	S of Tangier	Woodward	OK	36.379°N 99.53°W	01:48	0.2 mi (0.32 km)	30 yd (27 m)	A small tornado snapped two power poles and some light farm implements were thrown. The residence at the farm sustained minor damage.
EF0	Near Spearman	Hansford	TX	36.2°N 101.2°W	01:56–01:58	0.14 mi (0.23 km)	25 yd (23 m)	A storm spotter reported a tornado over open land.
EF1	SSE of Tuttle	Kidder	ND	47.0626°N 99.9262°W	02:00–02:10	2.35 mi (3.78 km)	70 yd (64 m)	A tornado damaged vehicles, stalls, and barns. Some animal feeders were tossed and trees were also uprooted.

=== May 25 event ===
List of confirmed tornadoes –Tuesday, May 25, 2010
EF#	Location	County / Parish	State	Start Coord.	Time (UTC)	Path length	Max width	Summary
EF0	SW of Lagarteo	Live Oak	TX	28.0708°N 98.0175°W	16:30–16:31	0.18 mi (0.29 km)	25 yd (23 m)	A brief tornado damaged metal animal shelters and awnings at a ranch. Limbs were snapped off some small trees and a large mesquite tree was snapped in half.
EF0	NW of Laura	Peoria	IL	40.9481°N 89.857°W	19:10–19:14	0.65 mi (1.05 km)	15 yd (14 m)	A landspout tracked over a farm field.
EF0	SSE of Cameo	Roosevelt	NM	34.27°N 103.2°W	21:13–21:22	0.25 mi (0.40 km)	10 yd (9.1 m)	An emergency manager reported a tornado briefly touching down over open rangeland.
EF0	SW of Towner (1st tornado)	Kiowa	CO	38.4306°N 102.1221°W	21:31–21:33	0.01 mi (0.016 km)	50 yd (46 m)	A brief landspout occurred over open country.
EF0	SW of Towner (2nd tornado)	Kiowa	CO	38.4107°N 102.1477°W	21:31–21:41	0.13 mi (0.21 km)	75 yd (69 m)	A landspout tornado occurred over open land.
EF0	SW of Towner (3rd tornado)	Kiowa	CO	38.4244°N 102.1297°W	21:32–21:40	0.14 mi (0.23 km)	75 yd (69 m)	A landspout was observed over open land.
EF0	SW of Towner (4th tornado)	Kiowa	CO	38.4182°N 102.137°W	21:37–22:03	0.36 mi (0.58 km)	100 yd (91 m)	A tornado tracked over open country.
EF0	SW of Towner (5th tornado)	Kiowa	CO	38.4159°N 102.1408°W	21:41–21:48	0.2 mi (0.32 km)	50 yd (46 m)	A landspout occurred over open country.
EF0	SW of Towner (6th tornado)	Kiowa	CO	38.4192°N 102.1355°W	21:48–21:49	0.1 mi (0.16 km)	50 yd (46 m)	A landspout occurred over open country.
EF0	SW of Towner (7th tornado)	Kiowa	CO	38.4146°N 102.1437°W	21:48–21:55	0.26 mi (0.42 km)	50 yd (46 m)	A landspout occurred over open country.
EF0	SSE of Pleasant Hill	Curry	NM	34.48°N 103.05°W	21:55–21:56	0.1 mi (0.16 km)	10 yd (9.1 m)	A tornado occurred just west of the New Mexico-Texas state line. No damage was reported.
EF0	SW of Towner (8th tornado)	Kiowa	CO	38.412°N 102.146°W	21:55–22:03	0.32 mi (0.51 km)	75 yd (69 m)	A landspout occurred over open country.
EF0	ESE of Sheridan Lake	Kiowa	CO	38.4415°N 102.2162°W	21:56–21:58	0.14 mi (0.23 km)	50 yd (46 m)	A landspout occurred over open country.
EF0	ESE of Sheridan Lake	Kiowa	CO	38.4375°N 102.215°W	21:56–21:58	0.17 mi (0.27 km)	50 yd (46 m)	A landspout occurred over open country.
EF0	E of Sheridan Lake	Kiowa	CO	38.456°N 102.1983°W	22:07–22:12	1.2 mi (1.9 km)	75 yd (69 m)	A landspout occurred over open country.
EF0	W of Towner	Kiowa	CO	38.4695°N 102.1635°W	22:18–22:20	0.19 mi (0.31 km)	50 yd (46 m)	A landspout occurred over open country.
EF0	N of Towner	Kiowa	CO	38.53°N 102.08°W	22:20–22:21	0.14 mi (0.23 km)	50 yd (46 m)	A landspout occurred over open country.
EF0	WNW of Horace	Greeley	KS	38.5647°N 102.0323°W	23:17–23:20	0.83 mi (1.34 km)	10 yd (9.1 m)	A brief tornado was spotted.
EF0	NNW of Horace	Greeley	KS	38.6092°N 101.8268°W	23:49–23:51	0.6 mi (0.97 km)	25 yd (23 m)	A tornado was observed over a wheatfield.
EF0	W of Dimmitt	Castro	TX	34.55°N 102.3551°W	00:52–00:53	0.2 mi (0.32 km)	50 yd (46 m)	Numerous storm chasers and storm spotters photographed a brief tornado over open fields.
EF0	WSW of Gove City	Gove	KS	38.8531°N 100.7337°W	01:06–01:07	0.34 mi (0.55 km)	10 yd (9.1 m)	A brief tornado occurred.
EF0	NE of Dimmitt	Castro	TX	34.5909°N 102.2703°W	01:11	0.1 mi (0.16 km)	20 yd (18 m)	Storm spotters observed a dusty tornado occurring on open rangeland.
EF0	SW of Gove City	Gove	KS	38.83°N 100.68°W	01:14–01:20	4.77 mi (7.68 km)	75 yd (69 m)	A tornado was spotted before becoming rain-wrapped.
EF0	NE of Dimmitt	Castro	TX	34.5807°N 102.2827°W	01:14	0.1 mi (0.16 km)	20 yd (18 m)	A brief and dusty tornado touched down over open rangeland.
EF1	SSW of Gove City to SSE of Quinter	Gove	KS	38.8619°N 100.5457°W	01:26–01:39	21.26 mi (34.21 km)	75 yd (69 m)	Approximately 15 power poles were damaged.
EF1	SE of Gove City to SSE of Quinter to S of Collyer	Gove, Trego	KS	38.844°N 100.3357°W	01:44–02:12	15.8 mi (25.4 km)	150 yd (140 m)	A tornado overturned a center-pivot in Gove County. The tornado began to occlude after entering Trego County, taking a sharp northeastern turn. No damage occurred in Trego County.
EF0	ENE of Walsh	Baca	CO	37.43°N 102.14°W	01:52–01:56	1.05 mi (1.69 km)	75 yd (69 m)	A tornado tracked northwest, damaging a mobile home and some outbuildings before lifting over open fields.
EF1	NE of Walsh	Baca	CO	37.4379°N 102.1713°W	02:00–02:07	2.48 mi (3.99 km)	300 yd (270 m)	A large tornado damaged fencing and uprooted trees.
EF0	S of Ellis to SSW of Yocemento	Ellis	KS	38.8707°N 99.5589°W	03:20–03:30	6.91 mi (11.12 km)	75 yd (69 m)	A tornado passed over pastureland.

=== May 26 event ===
List of confirmed tornadoes –Wednesday, May 26, 2010
EF#	Location	County / Parish	State	Start Coord.	Time (UTC)	Path length	Max width	Summary
EF0	Rocky Mountain Arsenal N.F.R.	Adams	CO	39.8502°N 104.8206°W	19:30–19:39	0.1 mi (0.16 km)	50 yd (46 m)	A tornado touched down but did no damage.
EF0	E of Keenesburg	Weld	CO	40.1°N 104.5011°W	21:30	0.1 mi (0.16 km)	50 yd (46 m)	A tornado occurred in an open field.
EF0	Grand Lake	Cameron	LA	29.924°N 92.6714°W	22:15–22:20	0.1 mi (0.16 km)	50 yd (46 m)	Local media KATC reported a tornado, which was confirmed through photos.
EF0	E of Ancona	Livingston	IL	41.03°N 88.8316°W	23:45–23:52	0.4 mi (0.64 km)	30 yd (27 m)	A small landspout occurred in a field.

=== May 27 event ===
List of confirmed tornadoes –Thursday, May 27, 2010
EF#	Location	County / Parish	State	Start Coord.	Time (UTC)	Path length	Max width	Summary
EF0	SSW of Brockway	McCone	MT	47.2064°N 105.8271°W	02:49	0.1 mi (0.16 km)	1 yd (0.91 m)	Two storm chasers reported a rope tornado.

=== May 31 event ===
List of confirmed tornadoes –Monday, May 31, 2010
EF#	Location	County / Parish	State	Start Coord.	Time (UTC)	Path length	Max width	Summary
EF2	SW of Pritchett	Baca	CO	37.3°N 102.94°W	20:55–21:17	2.82 mi (4.54 km)	400 yd (370 m)	A large, slow moving tornado moved across open fields. Fourteen power poles were snapped.
EF0	SSW of Pritchett	Baca	CO	37.25°N 102.96°W	21:07–21:13	0.28 mi (0.45 km)	75 yd (69 m)	A brief tornado over open country caused no damage.
EF2	SSW of Campo	Baca	CO	37.0687°N 102.6034°W	00:09–00:25	9.24 mi (14.87 km)	300 yd (270 m)	Eight power poles were snapped, two windmills were damaged and a storage shed was tipped over.
EF0	NW of Keyes	Cimarron	OK	36.9326°N 102.3907°W	00:58–01:00	1.75 mi (2.82 km)	25 yd (23 m)	A tornado remained over open country.
EF0	WNW of Eva	Texas	OK	36.82°N 101.97°W	01:51–01:53	1.7 mi (2.7 km)	25 yd (23 m)	A tornado was observed over open fields before becoming rain-wrapped.

== See also ==
- Tornadoes of 2010
- List of United States tornadoes in April 2010
- List of United States tornadoes in June 2010
