= List of tornadoes in the outbreak of May 10–13, 2010 =

List of tornadoes

This is the list of confirmed tornadoes from the tornado outbreak of May 10–13, 2010 that occurred over the Midwestern and southern United States.

== Confirmed tornadoes ==
Confirmed tornadoes by Enhanced Fujita rating
EFU	EF0	EF1	EF2	EF3	EF4	EF5	Total
0	39	33	13	4	2	0	91

=== May 10 event ===
List of confirmed tornadoes – Monday, May 10, 2010 (Note: All dates are based on the local time zone where the tornado touched down; however, all times are in Coordinated Universal Time for consistency.)
EF#	Location	County / Parish	State	Coord.	Time (UTC)	Path length	Max width	Summary
EF1	NE of Marienthal	Wichita	KS	38.4878°N 101.2062°W	18:27–21:31	0.89 mi (1.43 km)	25 yd (23 m)	A small shed was destroyed.
EF0	NNE of Marienthal	Wichita	KS	38.555°N 101.1992°W	18:31–18:41	1.34 mi (2.16 km)	25 yd (23 m)	Tornado remained over open country with no damage.
EF0	SSW of Russell Springs	Logan	KS	38.8162°N 101.2421°W	18:50–18:55	1.63 mi (2.62 km)	25 yd (23 m)	Tornado remained over open country with no damage.
EF0	NNE of Grigston	Scott	KS	38.5009°N 100.7045°W	19:00–19:01	0.07 mi (0.11 km)	25 yd (23 m)	Tornado remained over open country with no damage.
EF0	S of Russell Springs	Logan	KS	38.8102°N 101.1443°W	19:18–19:22	2.18 mi (3.51 km)	25 yd (23 m)	Tornado remained over open country with no damage.
EF0	W of Elkader	Logan	KS	38.7805°N 101.0555°W	19:22–19:25	1.28 mi (2.06 km)	25 yd (23 m)	Tornado remained over open country with no damage.
EF0	SSW of Arnold	Ness	KS	38.58°N 100.08°W	20:08–20:09	0.3 mi (0.48 km)	25 yd (23 m)	Tornado remained over open country with no damage.
EF0	SW of Wakita	Grant	OK	36.793°N 98.062°W	20:33	0.5 mi (0.80 km)	20 yd (18 m)	Tornado remained over open country with no damage.
EF3	SW of Wakita, OK to S of Renfrow, OK to E of Hunnewell, KS	Grant (OK), Kay (OK), Sumner (KS)	OK, KS	36.808°N 98.031°W	20:38–21:30	40.66 mi (65.44 km)	1,500 yd (1,400 m)	Began as a multiple vortex tornado near Wakita; developed into a large, long‑track wedge tornado. Severe damage was caused to two houses, of which, at least one was destroyed. An anchored mobile home was destroyed, and a large home had its top floor completely demolished, with the main structure nearly destroyed, injuring one person. Significant tree damage followed as it moved east‑northeast, and semi‑trucks were blown over along Interstate 35 at the Kansas state line. This tornado was well documented on video in its early stages. Two people were injured.
EF0	NW of Medford	Grant	OK	36.808°N 98.031°W	20:39	0.3 mi (0.48 km)	30 yd (27 m)	Brief satellite tornado to the main Medford wedge with no damage.
EF0	SW of Zenda	Kingman	KS	37.4002°N 98.3352°W	21:12–21:15	2.73 mi (4.39 km)	125 yd (114 m)	Rope tornado remained over open country with no damage.
EF1	NW of Braman	Grant, Kay	OK	36.919°N 97.528°W	21:15–21:23	5 mi (8.0 km)	500 yd (460 m)	Numerous trees and power poles were snapped.
EF1	N of Braman	Kay	OK	36.976°N 97.317°W	21:17–21:26	6.7 mi (10.8 km)	400 yd (370 m)	One house sustained significant roof damage and two semi‑trucks were blown off Interstate 35 south of the Kansas state line.
EF0	N of Nardin	Kay	OK	36.9°N 97.449°W	21:21–21:22	0.75 mi (1.21 km)	50 yd (46 m)	Anticyclonic tornado damaged a few trees and power poles.
EF2	SE of Belmont	Kingman	KS	37.4997°N 97.9898°W	21:34–21:42	3.14 mi (5.05 km)	700 yd (640 m)	A house had its roof torn off and two exterior walls blown out, while several others sustained lesser damage from this large tornado. Two garages were also destroyed, with debris and a lawnmower being carried 100 yards downstream.
EF1	N of Norwich	Kingman	KS	37.5193°N 97.8367°W	21:44–21:49	1.83 mi (2.95 km)	300 yd (270 m)	Damage limited to uprooted trees.
EF0	Cashion area	Canadian, Kingfisher, Logan	OK	35.723°N 97.745°W	21:46–21:54	6.9 mi (11.1 km)	30 yd (27 m)	Numerous outbuildings, trees, and power poles were damaged.
EF0	NE of Union City	Canadian	OK	35.439°N 97.911°W	21:46–21:52	4 mi (6.4 km)	30 yd (27 m)	Tornado confirmed by KWTV coverage with no damage.
EF1	E of Arkansas City (first tornado)	Cowley	KS	37.0724°N 97.0313°W	21:49–21:58	1.36 mi (2.19 km)	300 yd (270 m)	A bait shop and a storage shed were damaged.
EF0	NE of Red Rock	Noble	OK	36.479°N 97.173°W	21:53–21:54	0.5 mi (0.80 km)	20 yd (18 m)	Brief tornado with no damage.
EF1	N of Viola	Sedgwick	KS	37.5854°N 97.6434°W	21:58–22:07	5.09 mi (8.19 km)	300 yd (270 m)	Tornado was confirmed by spotters, and remained on the ground near Wichita Mid-Continent Airport. At least one house was damaged.
EF1	E of Marland to S of Burbank	Noble, Osage	OK	36.539°N 97.07°W	22:00–21:25	21 mi (34 km)	2,460 yd (2,250 m)	1.4 mi (2.3 km) wide wedge tornado damaged several houses and destroyed several barns and outbuildings.
EF1	SE of Marland	Noble	OK	36.50°N 97.07°W	22:02–22:03	1.5 mi (2.4 km)	40 yd (37 m)	A house and a casino sustained minor damage.
EF1	Hastings	Jefferson	OK	34.2257°N 98.1122°W	22:05–22:14	5 mi (8.0 km)	50 yd (46 m)	One house sustained severe damage as the tornado tracked onto Waurika Lake, briefly becoming a waterspout.
EF1	E of Arkansas City (second tornado)	Cowley	KS	37.0967°N 96.9703°W	22:08–22:10	0.67 mi (1.08 km)	150 yd (140 m)	Two houses were damaged and outbuildings were destroyed. Initially believed to be one tornado but later confirmed as two separate touchdowns.
EF0	SW of Grenola	Elk	KS	37.3139°N 96.5034°W	22:08–22:10	0.27 mi (0.43 km)	75 yd (69 m)	Brief tornado with no damage.
EF0	N of The Village	Oklahoma	OK	35.604°N 97.543°W	22:13	0.2 mi (0.32 km)	20 yd (18 m)	Brief tornado spotted near Quail Springs Mall by an Oklahoma City Police Department officer. Produced no damage.
EF1	NE of Bray	Stephens, Grady	OK	34.665°N 97.781°W	22:20–22:27	6.25 mi (10.06 km)	700 yd (640 m)	Anticyclonic tornado caused minor damage to a few mobile homes. Many trees, fences and power poles were also damaged.
EF4	NNE of Newcastle to S of Harrah	Cleveland, Oklahoma	OK	35.289°N 97.504°W	22:20–22:51	24 mi (39 km)	2,000 yd (1,800 m)	2 deaths - See section on this tornado – 49 people were injured.
EF1	Moore area (second tornado)	Cleveland	OK	35.312°N 97.48°W	22:22–22:27	3.75 mi (6.04 km)	250 yd (230 m)	Satellite tornado to the main Moore tornado. A few houses were damaged in the suburban area.
EF1	SE of Moore (third tornado)	Cleveland	OK	35.306°N 97.421°W	22:27	0.5 mi (0.80 km)	50 yd (46 m)	Second satellite to the main Moore tornado. Roof damage was inflicted to a few houses and a restaurant.
EF4	SSE of Norman to Lake Thunderbird to E of Pink	Cleveland, Pottawatomie	OK	35.1808°N 97.4273°W	22:32–22:59	22.25 mi (35.81 km)	880 yd (800 m)	1 death - See section on this tornado – 32 people were injured.
EF0	E of Burbank	Osage	OK	36.7°N 96.6117°W	22:33	0.1 mi (0.16 km)	75 yd (69 m)	Brief tornado with no damage.
EF1	Norman area (second tornado)	Cleveland	OK	35.1703°N 97.4498°W	22:34–22:40	5.5 mi (8.9 km)	250 yd (230 m)	Anticyclonic tornado; parallel track and possible satellite to the main Norman tornado. Minor damage to houses and trees.
EF1	W of Wayne (first tornado)	McClain	OK	34.882°N 97.424°W	22:36–22:43	4.6 mi (7.4 km)	880 yd (800 m)	Large anticyclonic tornado caused significant damage to the Mid‑America Technology Center.
EF0	W of Wayne (second tornado)	McClain	OK	34.893°N 97.433°W	22:37–22:38	0.8 mi (1.3 km)	75 yd (69 m)	Brief spin‑up satellite to the first Wayne tornado. A shed was damaged.
EF2	NE of Slaughterville to NNE of Pink	Cleveland, Pottawatomie	OK	35.118°N 97.274°W	22:39–22:59	17.35 mi (27.92 km)	440 yd (400 m)	Severe damage was inflicted to a mobile home park, with many mobile homes destroyed. A cell phone tower was mangled and the Country Boy IGA grocery store was heavily damaged. Extensive tree damage also took place. Three people were injured. Tornado generally followed the first Norman tornado.
EF0	SE of Shidler	Osage	OK	36.7419°N 96.5674°W	22:41–22:42	1 mile (1.6 km)	50 yd (46 m)	Tornado remained over open country with no damage.
EF0	WSW of Cornish	Jefferson	OK	34.1102°N 97.7454°W	22:44–22:46	1.5 miles (2.4 km)	30 yd (27 m)	Tornado remained over pastures with no damage.
EF0	NW of Pawhuska	Osage	OK	36.6854°N 96.3491°W	22:45–22:46	1 mile (1.6 km)	75 yd (69 m)	Tornado remained over open country with no damage.
EF3	SE of Newalla to NNW of Shawnee	Pottawatomie	OK	35.34°N 97.108°W	22:48–23:02	6.5 mi (10.5 km)	880 yd (800 m)	Several houses were reduced to their interior walls, and metal poles embedded in concrete were ripped from the ground. Trees were also debarked. A 80,000 pound boxcar was taken from a railway and rolled about 300 yards from where it originated. Three people were injured.
EF0	E of Loco	Stephens	OK	34.324°N 97.635°W	22:50–22:54	2 mi (3.2 km)	50 yd (46 m)	Tornado remained over open country with no damage.
EF3	SSW of Tecumseh to SE of Earlsboro to of S of Bearden	Pottawatomie, Seminole, Okfuskee	OK	35.246°N 96.984°W	22:56–23:47	37.2 mi (59.9 km)	2,200 yd (2,000 m)	Intense, 1.25 mi (2.01 km) wide tornado confirmed by the VORTEX2 team. The most severe damage occurred close to the town of Earlsboro, where a large, two‑story home was completely demolished, with only a couple of walls left standing. A pickup truck and a semi‑trailer were lofted for long distances, and seven transmission towers were toppled. The Seminole Municipal Airport had multiple hangars completely destroyed and a plane flipped by the tornado, and two nearby mobile homes were demolished. Many trees were downed or debarked along the path. 31 people were injured, some seriously.
EF2	NW of Wilson	Carter	OK	34.18°N 97.512°W	23:04–23:10	4.5 mi (7.2 km)	400 yd (370 m)	Several mobile homes were destroyed and many trees were heavily damaged.
EF3	N of Lone Grove	Carter	OK	34.245°N 97.319°W	23:22–23:34	4.9 mi (7.9 km)	400 yd (370 m)	One house and four mobile homes were destroyed and numerous other houses were damaged. Extensive tree and power line damage was observed, including to high tension poles.
EF0	SSE of Lone Grove	Carter	OK	34.188°N 97.205°W	23:25–23:26	0.5 mi (0.80 km)	30 yd (27 m)	Tornado confirmed by videotape with no damage.
EF1	SE of Okemah	Okfuskee	OK	35.3395°N 96.3089°W	23:45–00:10	14 mi (23 km)	1,000 yd (910 m)	Several houses were damaged and several outbuildings were destroyed. Damage also reported to trees and power lines.
EF0	E of Lexington	Cleveland	OK	35.02°N 97.213°W	23:52–23:54	2 mi (3.2 km)	80 yd (73 m)	Damage was limited to trees along the path.
EF1	ENE of Marietta	Love	OK	33.956°N 97.037°W	23:54–23:56	2 mi (3.2 km)	200 yd (180 m)	A country store and several outbuildings were damaged, and many trees were snapped or uprooted.
EF0	NE of Bryant	Okmulgee	OK	35.3982°N 96.0558°W	00:03–00:04	0.5 mi (0.80 km)	100 yd (91 m)	Brief tornado slightly damaged one house and a few trees.
EF2	S of Henryetta	Okmulgee	OK	35.3833°N 96.0266°W	00:04–00:22	12 mi (19 km)	1,250 yd (1,140 m)	Large wedge tornado reported on the ground in the area. A boat dock on Henryetta Lake was destroyed, along with a mobile home and an outbuilding. Damage occurred to several other houses and mobile homes, and a large swath of trees.
EF0	SE of Lebanon	Marshall	OK	33.951°N 96.888°W	00:08–00:09	0.7 mi (1.1 km)	40 yd (37 m)	Spotter‑confirmed tornado with no damage.
EF0	NW of Willis	Marshall	OK	33.919°N 96.871°W	00:15–00:16	0.63 mi (1.01 km)	40 yd (37 m)	Spotter‑confirmed tornado with no damage.
EF2	SE of Burney	McIntosh	OK	35.4028°N 95.8673°W	00:16–00:17	1.8 mi (2.9 km)	300 yd (270 m)	A barn and a mobile home were destroyed.
EF1	SE of Boley	Okfuskee	OK	35.4898°N 96.4835°W	00:17–00:35	15.5 mi (24.9 km)	650 yd (590 m)	Houses were damaged and the roof of the local police station was torn off. Major damage to trees and power poles.
EF2	SSE of Hoffman to SE of Council Hill	McIntosh	OK	35.441°N 95.814°W	00:23–00:41	13 mi (21 km)	800 yd (730 m)	Several houses and mobile homes were heavily damaged, and barns were destroyed along and near Lake Eufaula.
EF0	E of Burney	McIntosh	OK	35.4303°N 95.7911°W	00:25	0.4 mi (0.64 km)	100 yd (91 m)	Brief tornado snapped a few tree limbs.
EF1	W of Checotah	McIntosh	OK	35.4239°N 95.7757°W	00:28–00:30	2.6 mi (4.2 km)	600 yd (550 m)	Tornado reported by KOTV. Numerous trees were snapped, and a tractor was rolled.
EF1	SW of Pierce	McIntosh	OK	35.4239°N 95.7364°W	00:30–00:31	1 mi (1.6 km)	300 yd (270 m)	Trees and power poles were damaged.
EF1	Pierce	McIntosh	OK	35.4362°N 95.7177°W	00:31–00:32	0.5 mi (0.80 km)	150 yd (140 m)	Trees and power poles were damaged.
EF0	NE of Pierce	McIntosh	OK	35.4519°N 95.7008°W	00:32	0.2 mi (0.32 km)	75 yd (69 m)	Brief tornado snapped a few tree limbs.
EF1	S of Lake Eufaula to NW of Checotah	McIntosh	OK	35.4634°N 95.6807°W	00:33–00:40	6.5 mi (10.5 km)	1,100 yd (1,000 m)	Large anticyclonic tornado destroyed the local fire department building and several mobile homes. A few houses also sustained damage.
EF2	SE of Hitchita	McIntosh	OK	35.497°N 95.7354°W	00:35–00:36	1.3 mi (2.1 km)	200 yd (180 m)	A barn and a mobile home were destroyed and two houses were severely damaged. Trees and power poles were also damaged.
EF1	SE of Rentiesville	McIntosh	OK	35.5026°N 95.4784°W	00:46–00:56	6.5 mi (10.5 km)	800 yd (730 m)	A mobile home was destroyed and a house was damaged by this large wedge tornado.
EF1	NE of Shady Grove	Muskogee	OK	35.5293°N 95.3438°W	00:56–00:58	2 mi (3.2 km)	400 yd (370 m)	A couple houses lost their roofs. Extensive damage occurred to trees and power poles.
EF0	S of Mill Creek	Johnston	OK	34.362°N 96.879°W	01:05–01:09	3.5 mi (5.6 km)	80 yd (73 m)	Tornado reported by the county EMA with no damage.
EF1	NW of Gore to E of Paradise Hill	Muskogee, Sequoyah	OK	35.5722°N 95.1987°W	01:06–01:20	13 mi (21 km)	1,250 yd (1,140 m)	Large wedge tornado caused significant damage in a campground where recreational vehicles were thrown near Tenkiller Lake. Several houses were also damaged. Three people were injured.
EF1	S of Marble City	Sequoyah	OK	35.5535°N 94.8769°W	01:27–01:31	4 mi (6.4 km)	500 yd (460 m)	Damage to trees and power poles.
EF2	SW of Coleman	Johnston, Atoka	OK	34.254°N 96.432°W	01:42–01:45	1.85 mi (2.98 km)	400 yd (370 m)	Several houses sustained major damage, with others sustaining lesser damage. The U Cross Arena and Pavilion was heavily damaged.

=== May 11 event ===
List of confirmed tornadoes – Tuesday, May 11, 2010
EF#	Location	County / Parish	State	Coord.	Time (UTC)	Path length	Max width	Summary
EF0	SE of Ballville	Sandusky	OH	41.3029°N 83.1045°W	21:30–21:40	4.62 mi (7.44 km)	50 yd (46 m)	This tornado toppled numerous trees throughout its path, and barns and outbuildings suffered some sporadic damage.
EF0	WSW of Sharon	Woodward	OK	36.188°N 99.561°W	01:27	0.1 mi (0.16 km)	10 yd (9.1 m)	Brief tornado with no damage.
EF0	ENE of Fargo	Morrow	OH	40.3755°N 82.8014°W	00:58–01:02	2.05 mi (3.30 km)	50 yd (46 m)	A few homes sustained damage, and multiple trees were downed.
EF0	E of Wright to Windhorst	Ford	KS	37.781°N 99.8523°W	02:58–03:12	8.96 mi (14.42 km)	100 yd (91 m)	Trees, a roof, and a grain bin were damaged by this nighttime tornado.

=== May 12 event ===
List of confirmed tornadoes – Wednesday, May 12, 2010
EF#	Location	County / Parish	State	Coord.	Time (UTC)	Path length	Max width	Summary
EF0	SW of Galva	McPherson	KS	38.34°N 97.54°W	20:38–20:39	0.77 mi (1.24 km)	75 yd (69 m)	Tornado remained over open country.
EF0	SSW of Elyria	McPherson	KS	38.23°N 97.66°W	20:52–20:56	1.58 mi (2.54 km)	100 yd (91 m)	Tornado remained over open country.
EF0	WSW of Canton	McPherson	KS	38.3595°N 97.4728°W	21:16–21:17	0.53 mi (0.85 km)	75 yd (69 m)	Tornado remained over open country.
EF0	SW of Haven	Reno	KS	37.8292°N 97.7898°W	21:18–21:20	0.75 mi (1.21 km)	75 yd (69 m)	Tornado remained over open country.
EF0	NW of Vinson	Harmon	OK	34.9716°N 99.9474°W	23:20–23:25	2.73 mi (4.39 km)	50 yd (46 m)	Tornado remained over open country.
EF0	NNE of Towanda	Butler	KS	37.812°N 96.9931°W	01:11–23:25	1.28 mi (2.06 km)	75 yd (69 m)	Tornado remained over open pasture land.
EF1	NE of Bessie to NNE of Clinton	Washita, Custer	OK	35.414°N 98.962°W	01:21–01:35	10.4 mi (16.7 km)	50 yd (46 m)	A barn and a house were damaged, along with a few power poles.
EF0	S of Plattsburg	Clinton	MO	39.5121°N 94.47°E	04:52–04:55	0.29 mi (0.47 km)	25 yd (23 m)	Brief tornado damaged two greenhouses and several trees and power lines.

=== May 13 event ===
List of confirmed tornadoes – Thursday, May 13, 2010
EF#	Location	County / Parish	State	Coord.	Time (UTC)	Path length	Max width	Summary
EF1	SE of Milfay to NE of Slick	Creek	OK	35.7347°N 96.5499°W	09:19–09:36	20 mi (32 km)	1,000 yd (910 m)	Long‑track wedge tornado damaged numerous houses and destroyed barns and outbuildings. Extensive tree and power pole damage was also observed.
EF2	W of Sapulpa to Southeast Tulsa to SW of Fair Oaks	Creek, Tulsa	OK	35.9972°N 96.1317°W	09:43–10:04	22.7 mi (36.5 km)	500 yd (460 m)	Tornado started in Sapulpa and tracked through much of Tulsa south of downtown. Many houses and businesses were damaged, with the most significant damage occurring near U.S. Route 75.
EF1	Glenpool area	Creek, Tulsa	OK	35.9403°N 96.0619°W	09:45–09:59	14.1 mi (22.7 km)	500 yd (460 m)	Minor damage to numerous houses, businesses and trees in the mostly suburban area.
EF2	SE of Okmulgee	Okmulgee	OK	35.5942°N 95.9394°W	09:52–09:58	6 mi (9.7 km)	300 yd (270 m)	Two houses were heavily damaged and several others sustained minor damage. Barns and outbuildings were also destroyed.
EF2	SE of Oneta	Wagoner	OK	35.9991°N 95.7132°W	10:04–10:08	5.1 mi (8.2 km)	550 yd (500 m)	Two injuries occurred as one house was severely damaged. Sheds and outbuildings were destroyed and trees and power poles were knocked down.
EF2	NNW of Catoosa to Verdigris	Rogers	OK	36.2224°N 95.7481°W	10:05–10:08	5.1 mi (8.2 km)	550 yd (500 m)	Two houses sustained major damage, as did a metal building at the Port of Catoosa.
EF0	E of Catoosa	Rogers	OK	36.1647°N 95.6895°W	10:09–10:12	3.1 mi (5.0 km)	700 yd (640 m)	A barn was damaged and trees were blown down by this large but weak tornado.
EF2	SE of Inola to NNW of Chouteau	Rogers, Mayes	OK	36.1413°N 95.5111°W	10:17–10:26	8.7 mi (14.0 km)	1,000 yd (910 m)	A wood‑frame metal shop was destroyed and several houses were heavily damaged. High‑tension power poles were also knocked down. Two people were injured.
EF1	E of Hulbert	Cherokee	OK	35.93°N 95.1321°W	10:37–10:41	4 mi (6.4 km)	200 yd (180 m)	Many trees were snapped and several outbuildings were damaged.
EF1	E of Moodys	Cherokee	OK	36.03°N 94.9053°W	10:51–10:55	4 mi (6.4 km)	200 yd (180 m)	Damage limited to trees.
EF1	NNE of Copeland, OK to NNW of Tiff City, MO	Delaware, Ottawa	OK	36.6613°N 94.8252°W	11:05–11:13	8 mi (13 km)	500 yd (460 m)	Many trees were snapped or uprooted and several houses were damaged.
EF1	NW of Savoy	Washington	AR	36.1205°N 94.3553°W	11:24	0.1 mi (0.16 km)	75 yd (69 m)	Brief tornado reported by KNWA coverage. Trees were uprooted and snapped.
EF1	SSW of Monett	Barry	MO	36.908°N 93.9369°W	12:00–12:05	2.16 mi (3.48 km)	200 yd (180 m)	The tornado destroyed a casino park area in the Plymouth Hill Subdivision and a Pizza Hut restaurant.
EF0	SE of Hurley	Stone	MO	36.9155°N 93.4328°W	12:42–12:44	0.3 mi (0.48 km)	50 yd (46 m)	One house sustained minor damage and many trees were damaged.
EF0	NE of Sparta	Christian	MO	37.0117°N 93.0617°W	13:00–13:08	4.25 mi (6.84 km)	50 yd (46 m)	Many trees were downed, and at least one house was damaged.

== See also ==
- Tornadoes of 2010
- Tornado outbreak of May 10–13, 2010
