= Plum Creek =

Plum Creek may refer to:

== Waterways in the United States ==
- Plum Creek (Douglas County, Colorado)
- Plum Creek (Des Moines River tributary), Iowa
- Plum Creek (Nanticoke River tributary), Maryland and Delaware
- Plum Creek (Big Fork River tributary), Minnesota
- Plum Creek (Cottonwood River tributary), Minnesota
- Plum Creek (Mississippi River tributary), Minnesota
- Plum Creek (St. Francis River tributary), Missouri
- Plum Creek (Ottawa River tributary), Ohio
- Plum Creek (Niobrara River tributary), Nebraska
- Plum Creek (Allegheny River tributary), Pennsylvania
- Plum Creek (Little Shamokin Creek tributary), Pennsylvania
- Plum Creek (San Marcos River tributary), Texas
- Plum Creek (Wisconsin)

== Waterways in Canada ==
- Plum Creek (Manitoba), a tributary of the Souris River

== Places ==
- Plum Creek, Iowa, a ghost town
- Plum Creek Township (disambiguation)
- Plum Creek, Virginia, an unincorporated community

== Other uses ==
- Battle of Plum Creek, an attack by involving Comanche and Tonkawa tribes near Lockhart, Texas, on August 12, 1840
- Plum Creek Railroad Attack, a train derailment in August 1867
- Plum Creek Timber, the largest private landowner in the United States

== See also ==
- Plum Branch (disambiguation)
- Plum Run (disambiguation)
