= Plum Valley =

Plum Valley may refer to a location in the United States:

- Plum Valley, Illinois, a census-designated place
- Plum Valley, Missouri, an extinct town
- Plum Valley Airport in Oregon

== See also ==
- Plum Branch (disambiguation)
- Plum Creek (disambiguation)
- Plum River
