= Plum Branch (disambiguation) =

Plum Branch may refer to:

- Plum Branch, South Carolina, a town in McCormick County
- Plum Branch (Back Creek), a stream in Missouri
- Plum Branch (Clear Fork Blackwater River), a stream in Missouri
- Plum Branch (Miami Creek), a stream in Missouri
- Plum Branch (North Fork Fabius River), a stream in Missouri

== See also ==
- Plumb Branch
