= Burtville =

Burtville may refer to:

- Burtville, Missouri, an unincorporated community in the United States
- Burtville, Western Australia, an abandoned town in Australia
