= Plum Creek Township =

Plum Creek Township may refer to:

- Plum Creek Township, Kossuth County, Iowa
- Plum Creek Township, Butler County, Nebraska
