= Plum Creek Township, Kossuth County, Iowa =

Township in Kossuth County, Iowa, U.S.

Coordinates: 43.1192°N 94.1386°W

Plum Creek Township is a township in Kossuth County, Iowa, United States.

It took its name from Plum Creek.
