= John Green (defensive end) =

American football player (1921–1989)

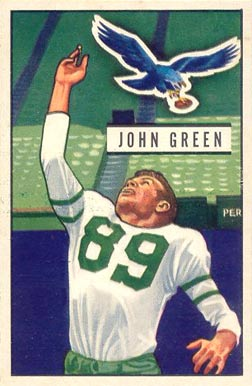
- Green on a 1951 Bowman football card

No. 89
- Positions: Defensive end, end

Personal information
- Born: October 14, 1921; Hastings, Oklahoma, U.S.
- Died: March 6, 1989 (aged 67); Palm Beach County, Florida, U.S.
- Listed height: 6 ft 1 in (1.85 m)
- Listed weight: 192 lb (87 kg)

Career information
- High school: Arp (Arp, Texas)
- College: Tulsa
- NFL draft: 1944: 16th round, 162nd overall pick

Career history
- Philadelphia Eagles (1947–1951); Saskatchewan Roughriders (1953)*
- * Offseason or practice squad member only

Awards and highlights
- 2× NFL champion (1948, 1949); Pro Bowl (1950)

Career NFL statistics
- Return yards: 71
- Fumble recoveries: 6
- Total touchdowns: 1
- Stats at Pro Football Reference

John Lincoln Green (October 14, 1921 – March 6, 1989) was an American professional football defensive end in the National Football League (NFL). He played five seasons for the Philadelphia Eagles from 1947 to 1951. He went to one Pro Bowl during his five-year career. Green played college football at the University of Tulsa and was selected in the sixteenth round of the 1944 NFL draft.
