= Plum Creek (Wisconsin) =

Stream in Sauk and Vernon County, Wisconsin, U.S.

Coordinates: 43°38′14″N 90°12′46″W

Plum Creek is a stream in Sauk and Vernon counties, in the U.S. state of Wisconsin.

Plum Creek was named for the wild plum trees in the area.

== See also ==
- List of rivers of Wisconsin
