= Plum Run =

Plum Run may refer to:

- Plum Run (Rock Creek), a stream in Pennsylvania
- Plum Run (White Run), a stream in Pennsylvania
- Plum Run (Chartiers Run tributary), a stream in Washington County, Pennsylvania
- Plum Run (Tenmile Creek tributary), a stream in Washington County, Pennsylvania
- Plum Run, West Virginia, an unincorporated community in Tyler County
