= Plum Branch (Back Creek tributary) =

Stream in the U.S. state of Missouri

Coordinates: 37.7492180°N 90.3615106°W

Plum Branch is a stream in St. Francois County in the U.S. state of Missouri. It is a tributary of Back Creek.

Plum Branch most likely was so named on account of plum trees in the area.

== See also ==
- List of rivers of Missouri
