= Charleston, Kansas =

Unincorporated community in Gray County, Kansas

Coordinates: 37°51′55″N 100°33′54″W

Charleston is an unincorporated community in Gray County, Kansas, United States. It is located along Highway 50.

== History ==
Charleston was a station and shipping point on the Atchison, Topeka and Santa Fe Railway.

A post office was opened in Charleston in 1908, closed temporarily in 1912, reopened in 1913, and was closed permanently in 1944.
