= Plum Creek (St. Francis River tributary) =

Stream in the American state of Missouri

Coordinates: 37.5564418°N 90.3503964°W

Plum Creek is a stream in Madison County in the U.S. state of Missouri. It is a tributary of the St. Francis River.

Plum Creek was named for the plum trees near its course.

== See also ==
- List of rivers of Missouri
