= Plum Valley, Missouri =

Extinct hamlet in Missouri, U.S.

Coordinates: 37°21′36″N 92°04′58″W

Plum Valley is an extinct town in west central Texas County, in the U.S. state of Missouri. The GNIS classifies it as a populated place. The community lies near the East Fork of Roubidoux Creek, approximately one mile west of Missouri Route 17 and 3.5 miles west of Bucyrus.

A post office called Plum Valley was established in 1858, and remained in operation until 1910. The community was named for a grove of wild plum trees near the original town site.
