= Plum Creek (Ottawa River tributary) =

Stream in Ohio, U.S.

Coordinates: 40°59′14″N 84°12′43″W

Plum Creek is a stream in the U.S. state of Ohio. This 14.4-mile (23.2 km) long stream is a tributary of the Ottawa River.

Plum Creek was named for the plum trees which once lined its banks.

== See also ==
- List of rivers of Ohio
