= Plum Branch (North Fork Fabius River tributary) =

Stream in the American state of Missouri

Coordinates: 40.250315°N 92.253519°W

Plum Branch is a stream in Knox and Scotland Counties in the U.S. state of Missouri. It is a tributary of the North Fork Fabius River.

Plum Branch was named for the plum trees near its course.

== See also ==
- List of rivers of Missouri
