= Beebe, South Dakota =

Unincorporated community in South Dakota, U.S.

Coordinates: 45°26′53″N 99°11′43″W

Beebe is an unincorporated community in Edmunds County, in the U.S. state of South Dakota.

== History ==
A post office at Beebe was established in 1911, and remained in operation until 1950. The community was named in honor of Marcus Beebe, a local banker.
