= Plum Creek (Mississippi River tributary) =

Stream in Stearns County, Minnesota, U.S.

Coordinates: 45°26′17″N 94°04′55″W

Plum Creek is a stream in Stearns County, in the U.S. state of Minnesota. It is a tributary of the Mississippi River.

Plum Creek was named for the wild plum trees lining its banks.

== See also ==
- List of rivers of Minnesota
