= Plum Branch (Miami Creek tributary) =

Stream in Bates County, Missouri, U.S.

Coordinates: 38.3730745°N 94.5421761°W

Plum Branch is a stream in Bates County in the U.S. state of Missouri. It is a tributary of Miami Creek.

Plum Branch was so named on account of the plum trees in the area.

== See also ==
- List of rivers of Missouri
