= Plum Branch (Clear Fork Blackwater River tributary) =

Stream in the American state of Missouri

Plum Branch is a stream in Johnson County in the U.S. state of Missouri. It is a tributary of the Clear Fork of the Blackwater River.

The stream headwaters arise at 38°39′51″N 93°35′24″W at an elevation of approximately 880 feet. The community of Burtville sits on the ridge above the west bank of the stream. The stream flows to the northwest for approximately 2.5 miles to its confluence with the Clear Fork at 38°41′27″N 93°37′00″W.

Plum Branch was named for the wild plum trees near its course.

== See also ==
- List of rivers of Missouri
