= Pierce, Oklahoma =

- Unincorporated community
- Location within Oklahoma Location within the United States
- Coordinates: 35°26′05″N 95°42′59″W
- Country: United States
- State: Oklahoma
- County: McIntosh
- Elevation: 630 ft (190 m)
- Time zone: UTC-6 (Central (CST))
  - Summer (DST): UTC-5 (CDT)
- Area codes: 918 & 539
- GNIS feature ID: 1100737

Pierce is an unincorporated community in McIntosh County, Oklahoma, United States. The community is 1.2 miles (1.9 km) south of the Pierce Road exit on Interstate 40 and 11.2 miles (18.0 km) west-southwest of Checotah.
