= Grigston, Kansas =

Unincorporated community in Scott County, Kansas

- Unincorporated community
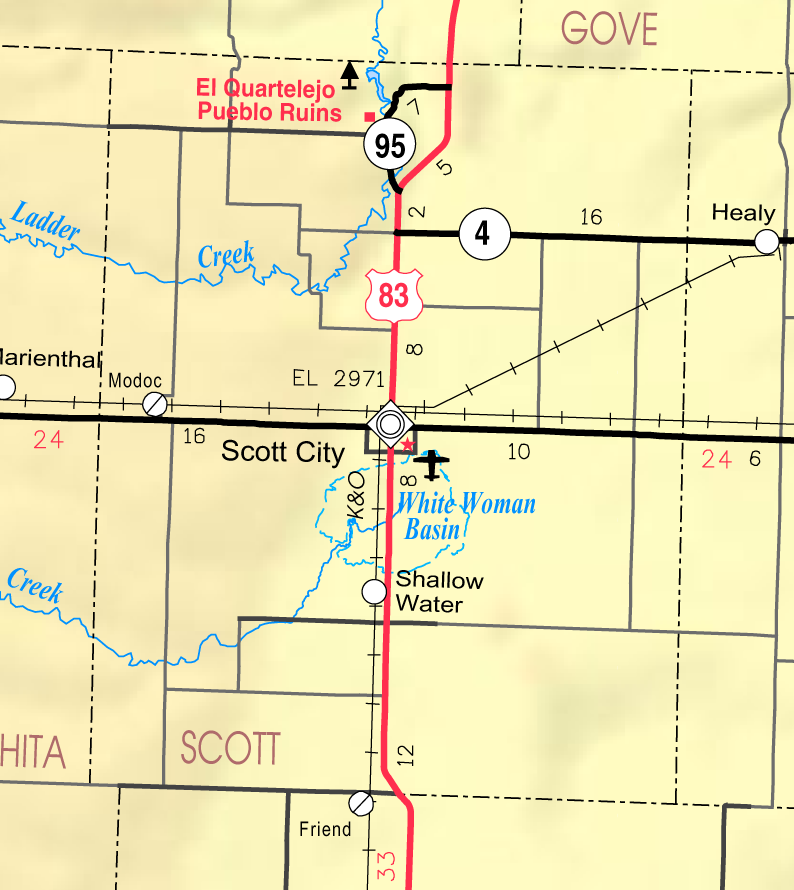
- KDOT map of Scott County (legend)

- Location within Kansas Location within the United States
- Coordinates: 38°29′5″N 100°43′2″W
- Country: United States
- State: Kansas
- County: Scott
- Elevation: 2,927 ft (892 m)
- Time zone: UTC-6 (CST)
  - Summer (DST): UTC-5 (CDT)
- Area code: 620
- FIPS code: 20-28875
- GNIS ID: 484562

Grigston is an unincorporated community in Scott County, Kansas, United States.

== History ==
A post office was opened in Grigston (formerly Grigsby) in 1886, and remained in operation until it was discontinued in 1955. Currently, the town consists only of several houses and a moderate-sized grain elevator complex.
