= Seminole Municipal Airport =

Airport in Oklahoma, United States

- IATA: none; ICAO: KSRE; FAA LID: SRE

Summary
- Airport type: Public
- Owner: City of Seminole
- Serves: Seminole, Oklahoma
- Elevation AMSL: 1,023 ft (312 m)
- Coordinates: 35°16′29″N 096°40′31″W

Map
- Location in Oklahoma SRE (the United States)

Runways
| Direction | Length | | Surface |
| Direction | ft | m | Surface |
|---|---|---|---|
| 16/34 | 5,004 | 1,525 | Asphalt |
| 5/23 | 2,000 | 610 | Turf |

Statistics (2011)
- Aircraft operations: 8,550
- Based aircraft: 22
- Source: Federal Aviation Administration

Seminole Municipal Airport (ICAO: KSRE, FAA LID: SRE) is a city-owned airport three miles north of Seminole, in Seminole County, Oklahoma. The National Plan of Integrated Airport Systems for 2011–2015 called it a general aviation facility.

Most U.S. airports use the same three-letter location identifier for the FAA and IATA, but this airport is SRE to the FAA and has no IATA code (Sucre Airport in Sucre, Bolivia has IATA code SRE).

== Facilities ==
Seminole Municipal Airport covers 220 acres (89 ha) at an elevation of 1,023 feet (312 m). It has two runways: 16/34 is 5,004 by 75 feet (1,525 x 23 m) asphalt; 5/23 is 2,000 by 150 feet (610 x 46 m) turf.

In the year ending June 21, 2011 the airport had 8,550 aircraft operations, average 23 per day: 99% general aviation and 1% military. 22 aircraft were then based at the airport: 91% single-engine, 4.5% multi-engine, and 4.5% helicopter.

== See also ==
- List of airports in Oklahoma
