= Plum Creek (Des Moines River tributary) =

Stream in Hancock County, Iowa, U.S.

Coordinates: 43.189684°N 93.931061°W

Plum Creek is a stream in Kossuth and Hancock counties, in the U.S. state of Hancock County, Iowa. It is a tributary of the east fork of the Des Moines River.

Plum Creek was named for the wild plum trees lining its banks.

== See also ==
- List of rivers of Iowa
