= Marienthal, Kansas =

Unincorporated community in Wichita County, Kansas

- Unincorporated community and CDP
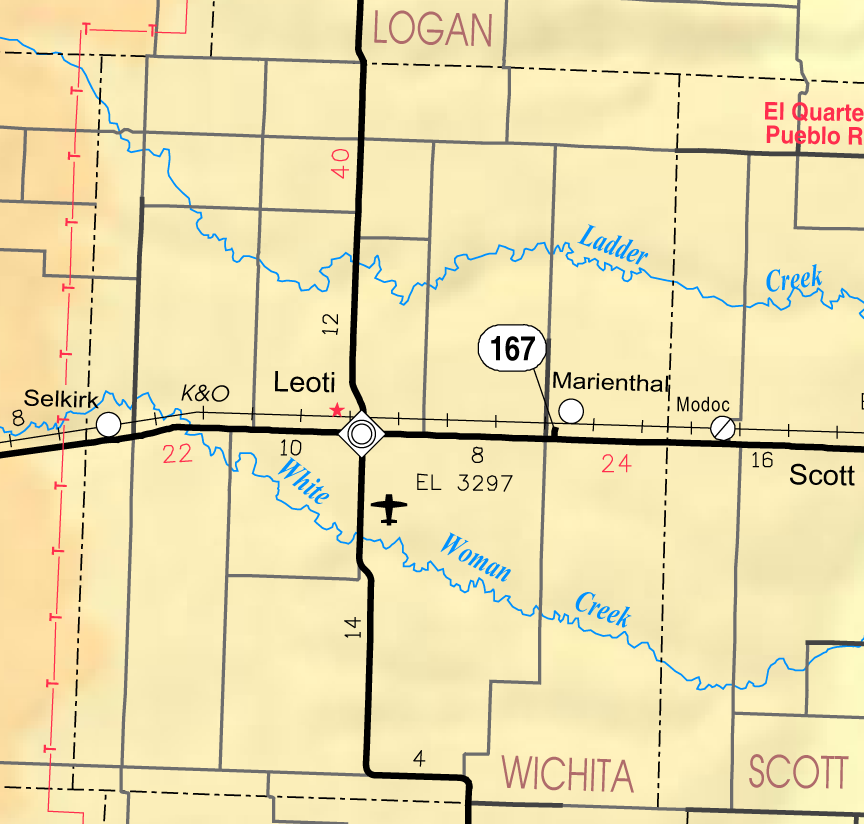
- KDOT map of Wichita County (legend)

- Location within Kansas Location within the United States
- Coordinates: 38°29′21″N 101°13′12″W
- Country: United States
- State: Kansas
- County: Wichita
- Named for: Marienthal, Russia
- Elevation: 3,225 ft (983 m)

Population (2020)
  - Total: 64
- Time zone: UTC-6 (CST)
  - Summer (DST): UTC-5 (CDT)
- ZIP Code: 67863
- Area code: 620
- FIPS code: 20-44600
- GNIS ID: 2629164

Marienthal is an unincorporated community and census-designated place (CDP) in Wichita County, Kansas, United States. As of the 2020 census, the population was 64.

== History ==
In 1892, the community was founded by a group of immigrant Volga Germans; they named it after their previous hometown of Marienthal (Tonkoschurovka), Russia (today Sovetskoya, Russia), located in the district of Saratov, on the east bank of the Volga River.

The post office was established March 18, 1902. The USPS discontinued service to Marienthal in 2011; the post office was officially closed in 2017.

Marienthal now consists of roughly 100 people, a Catholic church, a flour mill, a substance abuse treatment center, a trucking company, a bar and a grain elevator.

== Demographics ==
Historical population
Census	Pop.	Note	%±
2020	64		—
U.S. Decennial Census

The 2020 United States census counted 64 people, 33 households, and 21 families in Marienthal. The population density was 32.0 per square mile (12.4/km^{2}). There were 37 housing units at an average density of 18.5 per square mile (7.1/km^{2}). The racial makeup was 96.88% (62) white or European American (96.88% non-Hispanic white), 0.0% (0) black or African-American, 1.56% (1) Native American or Alaska Native, 0.0% (0) Asian, 0.0% (0) Pacific Islander or Native Hawaiian, 0.0% (0) from other races, and 1.56% (1) from two or more races. Hispanic or Latino of any race was 0.0% (0) of the population.

Of the 33 households, 36.4% had children under the age of 18; 48.5% were married couples living together; 15.2% had a female householder with no spouse or partner present. 33.3% of households consisted of individuals and 9.1% had someone living alone who was 65 years of age or older. The average household size was 1.3 and the average family size was 2.0. The percent of those with a bachelor's degree or higher was estimated to be 65.6% of the population.

34.4% of the population was under the age of 18, 1.6% from 18 to 24, 12.5% from 25 to 44, 37.5% from 45 to 64, and 14.1% who were 65 years of age or older. The median age was 51.0 years. For every 100 females, there were 77.8 males. For every 100 females ages 18 and older, there were 61.5 males.
