= Nardin, Oklahoma =

- Census-designated place
- Location within Oklahoma Location within the United States
- Coordinates: 36°48′15″N 97°27′00″W
- Country: United States
- State: Oklahoma
- County: Kay

Area
  - Total: 1.04 sq mi (2.69 km^{2})
  - Land: 1.04 sq mi (2.69 km^{2})
  - Water: 0 sq mi (0.00 km^{2})
- Elevation: 1,086 ft (331 m)

Population (2020)
  - Total: 43
  - Density: 41.4/sq mi (15.97/km^{2})
- Time zone: UTC-6 (Central (CST))
  - Summer (DST): UTC-5 (CDT)
- ZIP code: 74646
- Area code: 580
- GNIS feature ID: 2629932

Nardin is a census-designated place (CDP) and unincorporated community in Kay County, Oklahoma, United States. As of the 2020 census, Nardin had a population of 43.

== Demographics ==
Historical population
Census	Pop.	Note	%±
2020	43		—
U.S. Decennial Census

=== 2020 census ===
As of the 2020 census, Nardin had a population of 43. The median age was 47.5 years. 25.6% of residents were under the age of 18 and 32.6% of residents were 65 years of age or older. For every 100 females there were 104.8 males, and for every 100 females age 18 and over there were 128.6 males age 18 and over.

0.0% of residents lived in urban areas, while 100.0% lived in rural areas.

There were 15 households in Nardin, of which 20.0% had children under the age of 18 living in them. Of all households, 73.3% were married-couple households, 6.7% were households with a male householder and no spouse or partner present, and 20.0% were households with a female householder and no spouse or partner present. About 20.0% of all households were made up of individuals and 6.7% had someone living alone who was 65 years of age or older.

There were 23 housing units, of which 34.8% were vacant. The homeowner vacancy rate was 22.2% and the rental vacancy rate was 50.0%.

Racial composition as of the 2020 census
Race	Number	Percent
White	34	79.1%
Black or African American	0	0.0%
American Indian and Alaska Native	1	2.3%
Asian	0	0.0%
Native Hawaiian and Other Pacific Islander	0	0.0%
Some other race	0	0.0%
Two or more races	8	18.6%
Hispanic or Latino (of any race)	5	11.6%
