= Marland, Oklahoma =

- Town
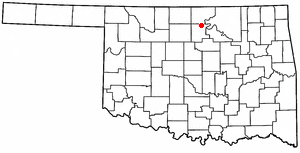
- Location of Marland, Oklahoma
- Coordinates: 36°33′40″N 97°09′10″W
- Country: United States
- State: Oklahoma
- County: Noble

Government
  - Type: Elected City Council

Area
  - Total: 0.27 sq mi (0.70 km^{2})
  - Land: 0.27 sq mi (0.70 km^{2})
  - Water: 0 sq mi (0.00 km^{2})
- Elevation: 1,020 ft (310 m)

Population (2020)
  - Total: 184
  - Density: 676.3/sq mi (261.13/km^{2})
- Time zone: UTC-6 (Central (CST))
  - Summer (DST): UTC-5 (CDT)
- ZIP code: 74644
- Area code: 580
- FIPS code: 40-46550
- GNIS feature ID: 2412957

Marland is a town in Noble County, Oklahoma, United States. As of the 2020 census, Marland had a population of 184. It was named for Ernest W. Marland, an oilman from nearby Ponca City who later became a governor of Oklahoma. Marland is on SH-156, south-southwest of Ponca City.

== History ==
Marland began as a community named "Bliss," a shipping point on the Atchison, Topeka and Santa Fe Railway (often called simply the Santa Fe). The surrounding countryside, formerly part of the Ponca reservation, had been leased for cattle grazing and was part of the Miller Brothers 101 Ranch. The brothers built stockyards adjacent to the railroad on the south side of their ranch for shipping cattle. A community began forming nearby, with grain elevator, a lumber yard and a general store. The Millers platted a town on the east side of the tracks in 1906 and began selling lots.

In 1917, the Millers decided to move the town to the other side of the tracks, about 1 mile (1.6 km) north. The population continued to grow, reaching 250 residents.

In the 1920s, oil discovered by Ernest W. Marland in the nearby Three Sands Field helped the town, leading to the April 1922 election and town name change to Marland. But the Great Depression of the 1930s bankrupted the Miller Brothers ranch, and the Three Sands Field went dry, stunting further town growth.

== Geography ==
According to the United States Census Bureau, the town has a total area of 0.3 square miles (0.78 km^{2}), all land.

== Demographics ==
Historical population
Census	Pop.	Note	%±
1930	361		—
1940	257		−28.8%
1950	221		−14.0%
1960	191		−13.6%
1970	236		23.6%
1980	340		44.1%
1990	280		−17.6%
2000	280		0.0%
2010	225		−19.6%
2020	184		−18.2%
U.S. Decennial Census

=== 2020 census ===
As of the 2020 census, Marland had a population of 184. The median age was 36.5 years. 28.8% of residents were under the age of 18 and 13.6% of residents were 65 years of age or older. For every 100 females there were 102.2 males, and for every 100 females age 18 and over there were 107.9 males age 18 and over.

0.0% of residents lived in urban areas, while 100.0% lived in rural areas.

There were 65 households in Marland, of which 47.7% had children under the age of 18 living in them. Of all households, 30.8% were married-couple households, 27.7% were households with a male householder and no spouse or partner present, and 33.8% were households with a female householder and no spouse or partner present. About 20.0% of all households were made up of individuals and 6.1% had someone living alone who was 65 years of age or older.

There were 86 housing units, of which 24.4% were vacant. The homeowner vacancy rate was 0.0% and the rental vacancy rate was 21.1%.

Racial composition as of the 2020 census
Race	Number	Percent
White	70	38.0%
Black or African American	0	0.0%
American Indian and Alaska Native	77	41.8%
Asian	0	0.0%
Native Hawaiian and Other Pacific Islander	0	0.0%
Some other race	4	2.2%
Two or more races	33	17.9%
Hispanic or Latino (of any race)	12	6.5%

=== 2000 census ===
As of the 2000 census, the median income for a household in the town was $27,188, and the median income for a family was $25,625. Males had a median income of $26,563 versus $18,000 for females. The per capita income for the town was $8,918. About 31.0% of families and 37.9% of the population were below the poverty line, including 49.6% of those under the age of eighteen and 27.3% of those 65 or over.

== See also ==
- List of municipalities in Oklahoma
