= Hastings, Oklahoma =

- Town
- Location within Oklahoma Location within the United States
- Coordinates: 34°13′28″N 98°06′31″W
- Country: United States
- State: Oklahoma
- County: Jefferson

Area
  - Total: 0.48 sq mi (1.25 km^{2})
  - Land: 0.48 sq mi (1.25 km^{2})
  - Water: 0 sq mi (0.00 km^{2})
- Elevation: 997 ft (304 m)

Population (2020)
  - Total: 104
  - Density: 215.6/sq mi (83.23/km^{2})
- Time zone: UTC-6 (Central (CST))
  - Summer (DST): UTC-5 (CDT)
- ZIP code: 73548
- Area code: 580
- FIPS code: 40-33000
- GNIS feature ID: 2412733

Hastings is a town in Jefferson County, Oklahoma, United States. As of the 2020 census, Hastings had a population of 104.

== History ==
A community called Bayard existed at the site of present-day Hastings until the Kiowa, Comanche, and Apache Reservation was opened to new settlers on August 6, 1901. Since Indian Territory already had a post office named "Baird", the postal department named the station it established at this location. A couple of residents had suggested naming it for their hometown of Hastings, Nebraska. That was accepted by postal officials.

In 1902, a railroad line called the Enid and Anadarko built tracks through Hastings. The population was 560 in 1907 and 727 in 1910. The population has declined nearly continuously from 1910 until the present.

== Geography ==
Hastings is located in northwestern Jefferson County 9 miles (14 km) northwest of Waurika along Oklahoma State Highway 5 and 5 miles (8.0 km) north of the Red River.

According to the United States Census Bureau, the town has a total area of 0.48 square miles (1.24 km^{2}), all land.

== Demographics ==
Historical population
Census	Pop.	Note	%±
1910	727		—
1920	629		−13.5%
1930	379		−39.7%
1940	352		−7.1%
1950	285		−19.0%
1960	200		−29.8%
1970	184		−8.0%
1980	246		33.7%
1990	164		−33.3%
2000	155		−5.5%
2010	143		−7.7%
2020	104		−27.3%
U.S. Decennial Census

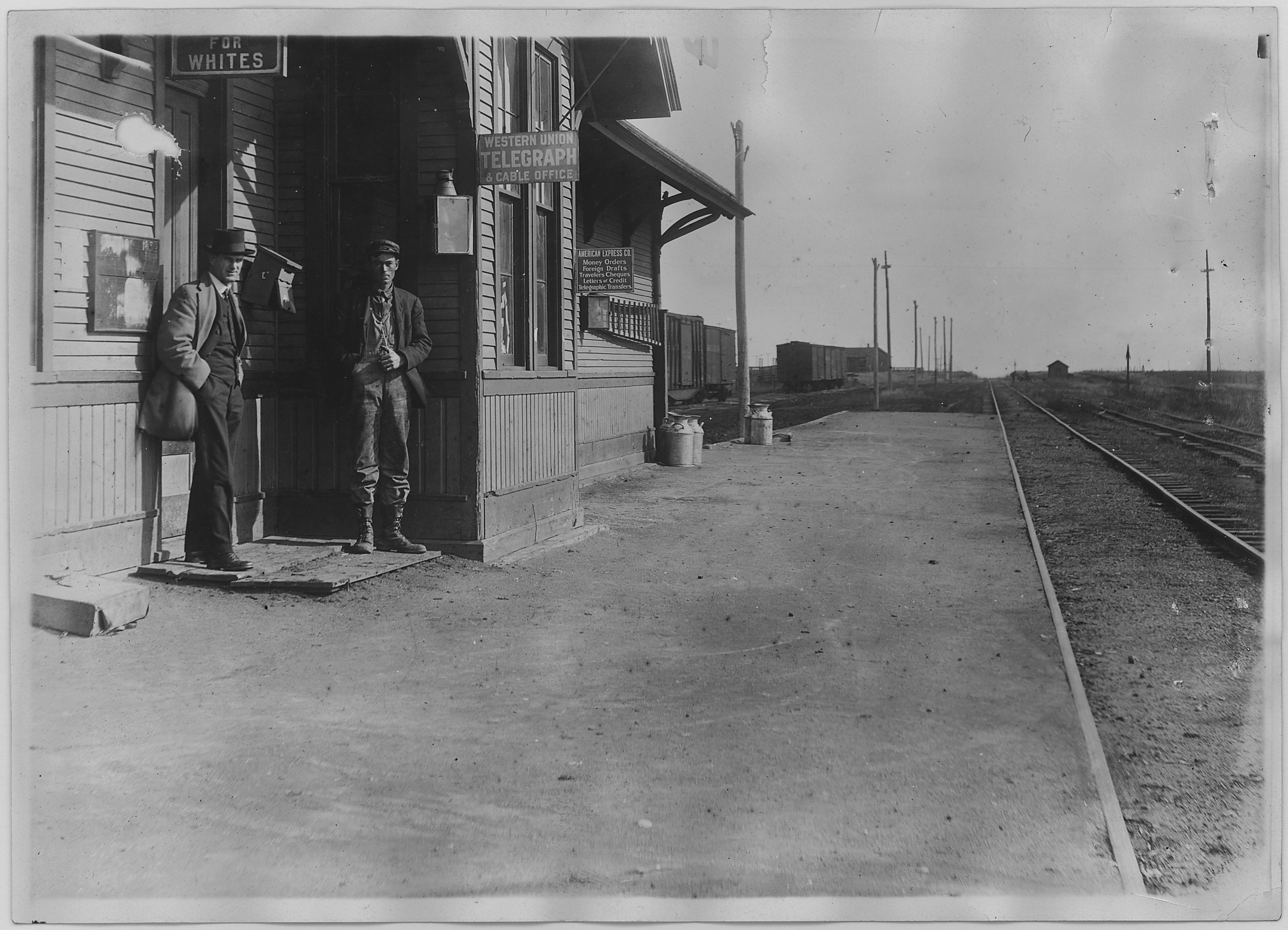
Hastings, Oklahoma (1919)

=== 2020 census ===
As of the 2020 census, Hastings had a population of 104. The median age was 56.5 years. 14.4% of residents were under the age of 18 and 33.7% of residents were 65 years of age or older. For every 100 females there were 100.0 males, and for every 100 females age 18 and over there were 102.3 males age 18 and over.

0.0% of residents lived in urban areas, while 100.0% lived in rural areas.

There were 56 households in Hastings, of which 33.9% had children under the age of 18 living in them. Of all households, 53.6% were married-couple households, 16.1% were households with a male householder and no spouse or partner present, and 25.0% were households with a female householder and no spouse or partner present. About 16.1% of all households were made up of individuals and 1.8% had someone living alone who was 65 years of age or older.

There were 60 housing units, of which 6.7% were vacant. The homeowner vacancy rate was 0.0% and the rental vacancy rate was 0.0%.

Racial composition as of the 2020 census
Race	Number	Percent
White	89	85.6%
Black or African American	5	4.8%
American Indian and Alaska Native	0	0.0%
Asian	0	0.0%
Native Hawaiian and Other Pacific Islander	0	0.0%
Some other race	5	4.8%
Two or more races	5	4.8%
Hispanic or Latino (of any race)	8	7.7%

=== 2000 census ===
As of the 2000 census, there were 155 people, 72 households, and 50 families residing in the town. The population density was 310/sq mi (120/km^{2}). There were 87 housing units at an average density of 174/sq mi (67/km^{2}). The racial makeup of the town was 93.55% White, 1.29% African American, 3.87% Native American, and 1.29% from two or more races.

There were 72 households, out of which 16.7% had children under the age of 18 living with them, 61.1% were married couples living together, 6.9% had a female householder with no husband present, and 29.2% were non-families. 25.0% of all households were made up of individuals, and 15.3% had someone living alone who was 65 years of age or older. The average household size was 2.15 and the average family size was 2.57.

In the town, the population was spread out, with 14.8% under the age of 18, 4.5% from 18 to 24, 20.0% from 25 to 44, 32.9% from 45 to 64, and 27.7% who were 65 years of age or older. The median age was 53 years. For every 100 females, there were 96.2 males. For every 100 females age 18 and over, there were 97.0 males.

The median income for a household in the town was $22,969, and the median income for a family was $23,281. Males had a median income of $25,357 versus $17,083 for females. The per capita income for the town was $13,017. About 14.8% of families and 19.1% of the population were below the poverty line, including 40.0% of those under the age of eighteen and 17.5% of those 65 or over.

== Notable people ==
- John Green, football player
