= Fargo, Ohio =

Unincorporated community in Ohio, U.S.

Coordinates: 40°21′29″N 82°49′53″W

Fargo is an unincorporated community in Morrow County, in the U.S. state of Ohio.

== History ==
Fargo was originally called Olmsteadville, and under the latter name was platted in 1838 by Francis C. Olmstead, and named for him. The community was later called Morton's Corners, after a family who kept a store there. Morton's Corners eventually became known as Fargo. A post office was established under the Fargo name in 1893, and remained in operation until 1904.
