= Burtville, Missouri =

Unincorporated community in the U.S. state of Missouri

Coordinates: 38°40′35″N 93°37′07″W

Burtville is an unincorporated community in southeastern Johnson County, in the U.S. state of Missouri.

The community is located on a narrow ridge between Plum Branch and the Clear Fork of the Blackwater River 7.5 miles southeast of Warrensburg.

== History ==
A post office called Burtville was established in 1892, and remained in operation until 1904. The community was named after the son of a first settler.
