= Belmont, Kansas =

Extinct town in Kingman County, Kansas, United States

Coordinates: 37°38′25.06″N 97°59′21.21″W

Belmont in 1913

Belmont is an unincorporated community in Kingman County, Kansas, United States. Its population in 1910 was estimated at 150 inhabitants.

== History ==
Belmont had a post office from 1879 to 1971.

== Geography ==
Belmont is located 12 miles Southeast of Kingman.
