= Ballville, Ohio =

- CDP
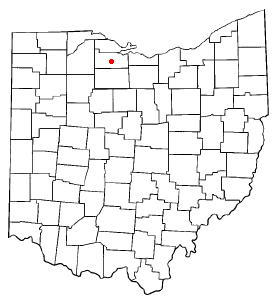
- Location of Ballville, Ohio
- Coordinates: 41°19′21″N 83°07′35″W
- Country: United States
- State: Ohio
- County: Sandusky
- Township: Ballville

Area
  - Total: 4.73 sq mi (12.25 km^{2})
  - Land: 4.52 sq mi (11.71 km^{2})
  - Water: 0.20 sq mi (0.53 km^{2})
- Elevation: 646 ft (197 m)

Population (2020)
  - Total: 3,823
  - Density: 845.2/sq mi (326.34/km^{2})
- Time zone: UTC-5 (Eastern (EST))
  - Summer (DST): UTC-4 (EDT)
- ZIP code: 43420
- Area codes: 419 and 567
- FIPS code: 39-03716
- GNIS feature ID: 2393326

Ballville is a census-designated place (CDP) in Sandusky County, Ohio, United States, adjacent to Fremont. The population was 3,823 at the 2020 census.

== History ==
Ballville was laid out around 1840. The community was named after Colonel Ball, a local Indian fighter.

== Geography ==
According to the United States Census Bureau, the CDP has a total area of 3.0 square miles (7.8 km^{2}), of which 2.7 square miles (7.0 km^{2}) is land and 0.2 square miles (0.52 km^{2}) (6.78%) is water.

== Demographics ==
Historical population
| Census | Pop. | Note | %± |
|---|---|---|---|
| 2020 | 3,823 | | — |
U.S. Decennial Census

=== 2020 census ===
As of the 2020 census, Ballville had a population of 3,823. The median age was 52.2 years. 18.0% of residents were under the age of 18 and 29.3% of residents were 65 years of age or older. For every 100 females there were 92.8 males, and for every 100 females age 18 and over there were 90.4 males age 18 and over.

92.6% of residents lived in urban areas, while 7.4% lived in rural areas.

There were 1,710 households in Ballville, of which 19.9% had children under the age of 18 living in them. Of all households, 56.2% were married-couple households, 13.3% were households with a male householder and no spouse or partner present, and 24.6% were households with a female householder and no spouse or partner present. About 29.6% of all households were made up of individuals and 17.5% had someone living alone who was 65 years of age or older.

There were 1,786 housing units, of which 4.3% were vacant. The homeowner vacancy rate was 0.6% and the rental vacancy rate was 2.2%.

Racial composition as of the 2020 census
| Race | Number | Percent |
|---|---|---|
| White | 3,401 | 89.0% |
| Black or African American | 65 | 1.7% |
| American Indian and Alaska Native | 7 | 0.2% |
| Asian | 24 | 0.6% |
| Native Hawaiian and Other Pacific Islander | 0 | 0.0% |
| Some other race | 69 | 1.8% |
| Two or more races | 257 | 6.7% |
| Hispanic or Latino (of any race) | 308 | 8.1% |

=== 2000 census ===
As of the census of 2000, there were 3,255 people, 1,332 households, and 1,008 families residing in the CDP. The population density was 1,187.0 inhabitants per square mile (458.3/km^{2}). There were 1,375 housing units at an average density of 501.4 per square mile (193.6/km^{2}). The racial makeup of the CDP was 94.81% White, 1.26% African American, 0.06% Native American, 0.74% Asian, 1.90% from other races, and 1.23% from two or more races. Hispanic or Latino of any race were 3.69% of the population.

There were 1,332 households, out of which 27.9% had children under the age of 18 living with them, 65.0% were married couples living together, 7.6% had a female householder with no husband present, and 24.3% were non-families. 21.7% of all households were made up of individuals, and 11.4% had someone living alone who was 65 years of age or older. The average household size was 2.42 and the average family size was 2.80.

In the CDP the population was spread out, with 21.8% under the age of 18, 5.7% from 18 to 24, 23.3% from 25 to 44, 29.0% from 45 to 64, and 20.2% who were 65 years of age or older. The median age was 45 years. For every 100 females there were 91.1 males. For every 100 females age 18 and over, there were 86.7 males.

The median income for a household in the CDP was $49,261, and the median income for a family was $59,063. Males had a median income of $45,547 versus $31,532 for females. The per capita income for the CDP was $29,272. About 4.6% of families and 5.1% of the population were below the poverty line, including 8.6% of those under age 18 and 3.5% of those age 65 or over.
