= Oneta, Oklahoma =

Unincorporated community in Oklahoma, US

Oneta is a small unincorporated community in Wagoner County in the U.S. state of Oklahoma. The post office opened July 7, 1905, and closed November 30, 1922.

Oneta is located at 36°01′08″N 95°42′29″W.

Near Oneta is the Tulsa Tower Joint Venture broadcast tower, a cable-stayed VHF/UHF television transmission tower (also used for cellphone signals) with a height of 559 meters (some sources say 560.5 meters).
