= List of crossings of the Arkansas River =

This is a partial list of bridges and other crossings of the Arkansas River starting from the mouth at the Mississippi River upstream to its source in Colorado.

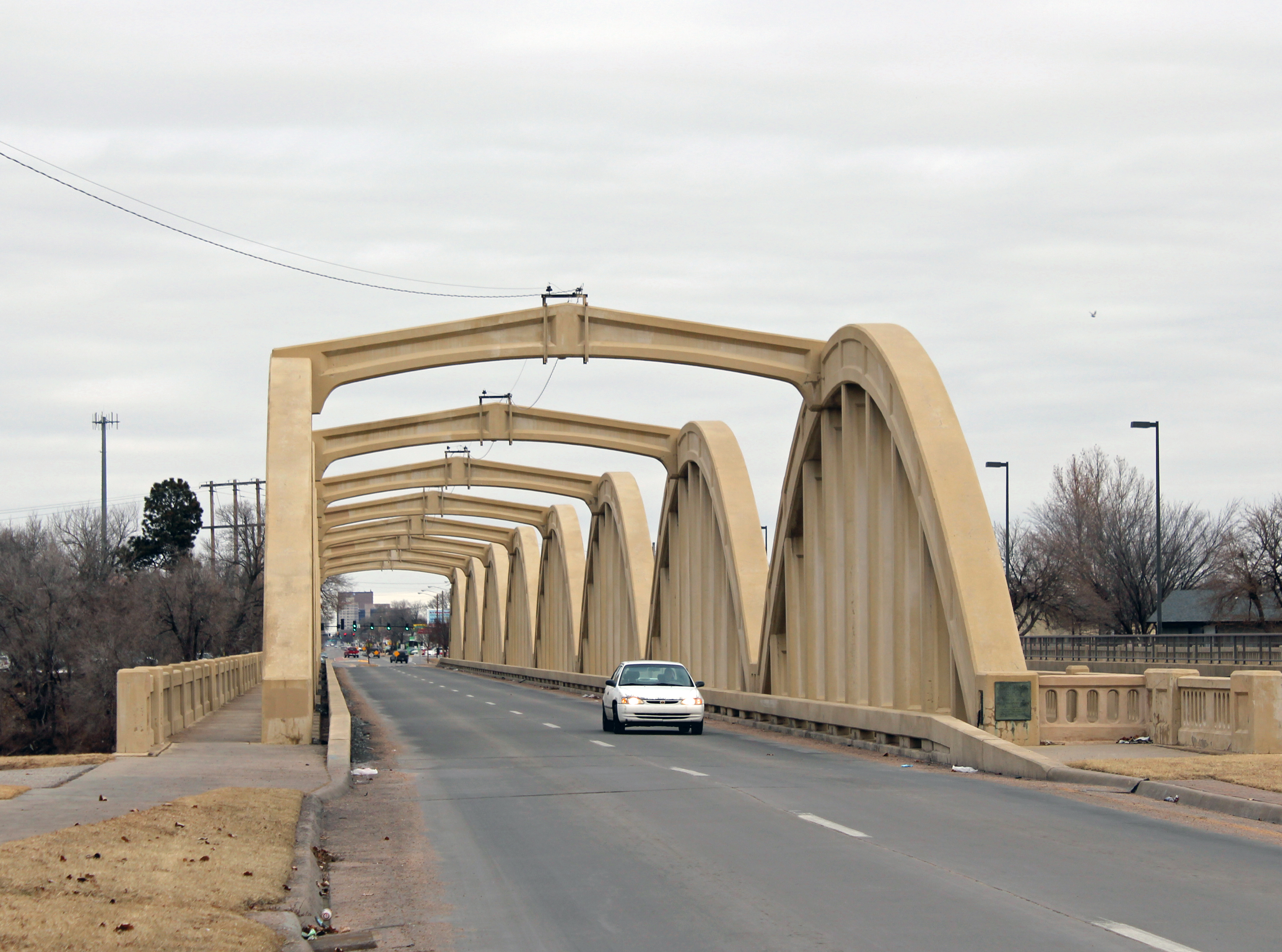
John Mack Bridge, which crosses the Arkansas River in Wichita, Kansas

== Crossings ==
Crossing	Carries	Location	Coordinates
=== Arkansas ===
Yancopin Bridge	Abandoned Rail	Watson	33.955304°N 91.206075°W
Wilbur D. Mills Dam		Arkansas Post	33.988940°N 91.313290°W
Pendleton Bridge	US 165	Arkansas Post	33.980271°N 91.384621°W
Joe Hardin Lock and Dam 3		Grady	34.162848°N 91.679878°W
Emmett Sanders Lock and Dam 4		Pine Bluff	34.248850°N 91.903728°W
Lawrence Blackwell Bridge	US 63 / US 79	Pine Bluff	34.248850°N 91.903728°W
Rob Roy Bridge	Rail	Pine Bluff	34.267023°N 91.912394°W
79-B Bridge	US 79	Pine Bluff	34.289697°N 91.997019°W
Lock and Dam #5		Redfield	34.411867°N 92.102852°W
Pipeline bridge		Redfield	34.479852°N 92.123966°W
David D. Terry Lock & Dam 6		Little Rock	34.667241°N 92.157054°W
I-440 Bridge	I-440	Little Rock	34.723874°N 92.177892°W
Rock Island Bridge	Abandoned Rail	Little Rock	34.749749°N 92.258817°W
I-30 Bridge	I-30	Little Rock	34.750263°N 92.262732°W
Junction Bridge		Little Rock	34.750843°N 92.266402°W
Main Street Bridge		Little Rock	34.751202°N 92.268925°W
Broadway Bridge	US 70	Little Rock	34.752368°N 92.274213°W
Baring Cross Bridge	Union Pacific Railroad	Little Rock	34.754448°N 92.281981°W
Murray Lock and Dam (Big Dam Bridge)	Longest pedestrian bridge in US	Little Rock	34.793647°N 92.358541°W
I-430 Bridge	I-430	Little Rock	34.800598°N 92.374485°W
Toad Suck Ferry Lock and Dam	AR 60	Conway	35.077372°N 92.541830°W
Highway 9 Bridge	AR 9 / AR 113	Morrilton	35.126041°N 92.732812°W
Arthur V. Ormond Lock & Dam 9		Morrilton	35.12563°N 92.787641°W
Highway 7 Bridge	AR 7	Russellville	35.225720°N 93.150480°W
Dardanelle Lock & Dam 10		Russellville	35.249124°N 93.170757°W
Morrison Bluff Bridge; also known as Ada Mills Bridge	AR 109 Arkansas Longest Bridge	Morrison Bluff	35.411221°N 93.532038°W
Ozark-Jeta Taylor Lock & Dam 12		Ozark	35.472012°N 93.813962°W
Ozark Bridge	AR 23	Ozark	35.482530°N 93.832737°W
James W. Trimble Lock & Dam 13	AR 59	Barling	35.351617°N 94.296520°W
I-540 Bridge	I-540	Fort Smith	35.421410°N 94.349240°W
Bridge	US 64	Fort Smith	35.428305°N 94.359437°W
Fort Smith Frisco Bridge	Arkansas & Missouri tourist railroad	Fort Smith	35.432806°N 94.364721°W
=== Arkansas - Oklahoma ===
Lyle Rymer Highway Bridge	US 64	Fort Smith	35.392289°N 94.432718°W
=== Oklahoma ===
W. D. Mayo Lock & Dam 14	No bridge	Spiro	35.316071°N 94.558704°W
Rail Bridge	Kansas City Southern Railway	Spiro	35.300836°N 94.620781°W
US 59 Bridge	US 59	Sallisaw	35.350046°N 94.771984°W
Robert S. Kerr Lock & Dam 15	No bridge	Sallisaw	35.344290°N 94.775360°W
I-40 Bridge	I-40, bridge disaster	Gore	35.486648°N 95.097705°W
US 64 Bridge	US 64 / SH-100	Gore	35.519340°N 95.125962°W
Webbers Falls Lock and Dam 16	No bridge	Gore	35.554033°N 95.16881°W
US 62 Bridge	US 62	Muskogee	35.769962°N 95.299505°W
Muskogee Turnpike bridge	SH-351 (Muskogee Turnpike)	Muskogee	35.797383°N 95.316601°W
York Street Bridge	SH-16	Muskogee	35.793985°N 95.334143°W
Old OK 16 (Jefferson Highway)	(Abandoned)	Muskogee	35.793985°N 95.334143°W
2 Rail Bridges	Union Pacific Railroad	Muskogee	35.793985°N 95.334143°W
US 69 Overpass	US 69	Muskogee	35.806803°N 95.401936°W
Old OK 104 Bridge	Former SH-104	Haskell	35.820824°N 95.641270°W
Oklahoma Highway 104 Bridge	SH-104	Haskell	35.821941°N 95.641790°W
Lt. Col. Ernest Childers Highway Bridge	SH-72	Coweta	35.919026°N 95.656982°W
Memorial Drive Bridge	US 64	Bixby	35.957687°N 95.886400°W
Old US 64 Bridge	Pedestrian Bridge	Bixby	35.957687°N 95.886400°W
Creek Turnpike Bridge	SH-364 (Creek Turnpike)	Jenks-Tulsa	36.018274°N 95.953062°W
96th Street Bridge	East 96th Street (Tulsa); East Main Street (Jenkins)	Jenks-Tulsa	36.024678°N 95.954885°W
Jenks Bridge	Pedestrian Bridge	Jenks-Tulsa	36.024678°N 95.954885°W
71st Street Bridge	71st Street	Tulsa	36.060819°N 95.980976°W
I-44 Bridge	I-44	Tulsa	36.089794°N 95.988408°W
Zink Dam	Low-Water Dam	Tulsa	36.120544°N 95.988686°W
Midland Valley Railroad bridge	Pedestrian Bridge	Tulsa	36.120544°N 95.988686°W
23rd Street Bridge	West 23rd Street	Tulsa	36.131501°N 95.992916°W
11th Street Bridge Former US 66 bridge	(Abandoned; Closed to all traffic)	Tulsa	36.142642°N 96.004551°W
I-244 (2 Bridges)	I-244 / US 75	Tulsa	36.142714°N 96.005053°W
BNSF RR Bridge	BNSF Railway	Tulsa	36.14342°N 96.006056°W
Oklahoma Highway 97/51 Bridge	SH-51 / SH-97	Sand Springs	36.060819°N 95.980976°W
Keystone Dam	SH-151	Sand Springs	36.142642°N 96.004551°W
=== Kansas ===
Bridge	I-35 (Kansas Turnpike)	Wichita	37.624906°N 97.297642°W
John Mack Bridge	South Broadway	Wichita	37.644722°N 97.335278°W
=== Colorado ===
SH 89 Bridge	SH 89	Prowers County	38.0949°N 102.3107°W
US 385 Bridge	US 385	Prowers County	38.4864°N 105.3732°W
Main Street Bridge	US 50 / US 287 (Main Street)	Lamar	38.1056°N 102.6184°W
Bent Avenue Bridge	US 50 (Bent Avenue)	Las Animas	38.08211°N 103.2200°W
Adams Avenue, Main Street Bridge	SH 109	La Junta	37.9907°N 103.5318°W
SH 266 Bridge	SH 266	Rocky Ford	38.0646°N 103.6849°W
SH 71 Bridge	SH 71	Rocky Ford	38.1064°N 103.7475°W
SH 207 Bridge	SH 207 / SH 266	Manzanola	38.1272°N 103.8620°W
SH 167 Bridge	SH 167	Fowler	38.1411°N 104.0227°W
US 50 Bridge	US 50	Avondale	38.24485°N 104.3440°W
Avondale Boulevard Bridge	Avondale Boulevard	Avondale	38.2422°N 104.3491°W
36th Lane Bridge	SH 231 (36th Lane)	Pueblo County	38.2666°N 104.4576°W
Baxter Road Bridge	SH 233 (Baxter Road)	Pueblo County	38.2581°N 104.4966°W
La Crosse Avenue Bridge	SH 227 (La Crosse Avenue)	Pueblo	38.2538°N 104.5885°W
Santa Fe Bridge	US 50 (Santa Fe Avenue)	Pueblo	38.2544°N 104.6067°W
I-25, Highway 85/87 Bridge	I-25 / US 85 / US 87	Pueblo	38.2551°N 104.6079°W
4th Street Bridge	SH 96 (West 4th Street)	Pueblo	38.2688°N 104.6239°W
Pueblo Boulevard Bridge	SH 45 (Pueblo Boulevard)	Pueblo	38.2686°N 104.6621°W
Juniper Bridge	Juniper Road	Pueblo	38.2710°N 104.7193°W
Colorado 120 Bridge	SH 120	Portland	38°N 105°W
Colorado 67 Bridge	SH 67 (Pikes Peak Avenue)	Florence	38°N 105°W
Mac Kenzie Boulevard Bridge	Mac Kenzie Boulevard	Cañon City	38°N 105°W
Raynolds Avenue Bridge	Raynolds Avenue	Cañon City	38°N 105°W
South 9th Street Bridge	SH 115 (South 9th Street)	Cañon City	38°N 105°W
"Black Bridge" Railroad Bridge	Railroad	Cañon City	38°N 105°W
Arkansas Riverwalk Bridge	Arkansas Riverwalk	Cañon City	38°N 105°W
South 4th Street Bridge and Viaduct	South 4th Street	Cañon City	38°N 105°W
Historic South 4th Street Bridge	Arkansas Riverwalk	Cañon City	38°N 105°W
South 1st Street Bridge	South 1st Street	Cañon City	38°N 105°W
Royal Gorge Bridge (Note: The Royal Gorge Bridge crosses 955 feet (291 m) above the Arkansas River.)	Pedestrian tourist bridge	Cañon City	38.4614°N 105.3253°W
US 50 bridge	US 50	Fremont County	38.4864°N 105.3732°W
West 1st Street	SH 291 (West 1st Street)	Salida	38.5462°N 106.0091°W
US 291 Bridge	SH 291	Chaffee County	38.6083°N 106.0646°W
US 285/24 Bridge	US 24 / US 285	Chaffee County	39.8131°N 106.1043°W
SH 91 Bridge	SH 91; First bridge over Arkansas	Summit County	39.3607°N 106.1790°W

== See also ==
- List of crossings of the Lower Mississippi River
- McClellan–Kerr Arkansas River Navigation System
