= Shady Grove, Oklahoma =

Shady Grove is the name of some places in the U.S. state of Oklahoma:

- Shady Grove, Cherokee County, Oklahoma
- Shady Grove, McIntosh County, Oklahoma
- Shady Grove, Pawnee County, Oklahoma
