= Boynton, Oklahoma =

- Town
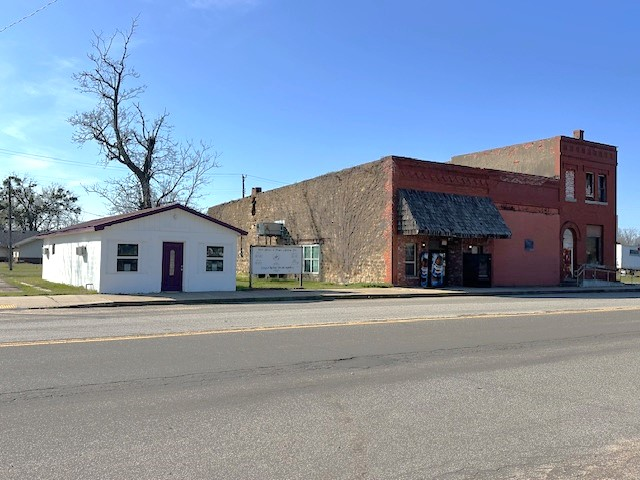
- Buildings in Boynton, March of 2026

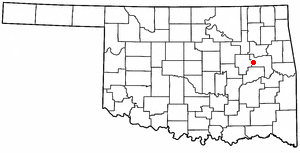
- Location in Oklahoma
- Coordinates: 35°38′58″N 95°39′13″W
- Country: United States
- State: Oklahoma
- County: Muskogee

Area
  - Total: 0.42 sq mi (1.10 km^{2})
  - Land: 0.42 sq mi (1.09 km^{2})
  - Water: 0.0039 sq mi (0.01 km^{2})
- Elevation: 614 ft (187 m)

Population (2020)
  - Total: 161
  - Density: 383.2/sq mi (147.96/km^{2})
- Time zone: UTC-6 (Central (CST))
  - Summer (DST): UTC-5 (CDT)
- ZIP Code: 74422
- Area codes: 539/918
- FIPS code: 40-08150
- GNIS feature ID: 2411716

Boynton is a town in Muskogee County, Oklahoma, United States. The population was 161 at the 2020 census, down from 248 in 2010.

== History ==
Boynton was built in 1903 with the coming of the St. Louis–San Francisco Railway to the Muscogee (Creek) Nation. The post office was named for E. L. Boynton, chief engineer of the Missouri Coal and Railroad Company. Boosted by an oil refinery and a brick factory, the town reached a peak population of 1,400 in the 1920 census. By 2000 the population had declined to 274. The local school district, Boynton-Moton Public Schools, closed its high school in September 2010; in March 2011, the Oklahoma State Board of Education voted to revoke the district's accreditation and close the lower school as of June 2011.

== Geography ==
Boynton is in western Muskogee County, 22 miles (35 km) by road southwest of Muskogee. U.S. Route 62 passes through the town, leading north and east to Muskogee, and south and west 14 miles (23 km) to Morris. State Highway 72 runs with US 62 through Boynton but leads north 12 miles (19 km) to Haskell and south 10 miles (16 km) to is terminus at U.S. Route 266, with Checotah an additional 7 miles (11 km) to the southeast.

According to the U.S. Census Bureau, the town of Boynton has a total area of 0.425 square miles (1.101 km^{2}), of which 0.005 square miles (0.013 km^{2}), or 1.18%, are water. Cloud Creek passes just east of the town limits, flowing north to join the Arkansas River between Haskell and Taft.

== Demographics ==
Historical population
Census	Pop.	Note	%±
1910	679		—
1920	1,204		77.3%
1930	1,204		0.0%
1940	842		−30.1%
1950	718		−14.7%
1960	604		−15.9%
1970	522		−13.6%
1980	518		−0.8%
1990	391		−24.5%
2000	274		−29.9%
2010	248		−9.5%
2020	161		−35.1%
U.S. Decennial Census

=== Racial and ethnic composition ===
Boynton town, Oklahoma – Racial and ethnic composition Note: the US Census treats Hispanic/Latino as an ethnic category. This table excludes Latinos from the racial categories and assigns them to a separate category. Hispanics/Latinos may be of any race.
Race / Ethnicity (NH = Non-Hispanic)	Pop 2000	Pop 2010	Pop 2020	% 2000	% 2010	% 2020
White alone (NH)	75	62	43	27.37%	25.00%	26.71%
Black or African American alone (NH)	151	129	77	55.11%	52.02%	47.83%
Native American or Alaska Native alone (NH)	16	19	9	5.84%	7.66%	5.59%
Asian alone (NH)	0	0	0	0.00%	0.00%	0.00%
Pacific Islander alone (NH)	0	0	0	0.00%	0.00%	0.00%
Other race alone (NH)	0	0	0	0.00%	0.00%	0.00%
Mixed race or Multiracial (NH)	30	31	28	10.95%	12.50%	17.39%
Hispanic or Latino (any race)	2	7	4	0.73%	2.82%	2.48%
Total	274	248	161	100.00%	100.00%	100.00%

=== 2020 census ===
As of the 2020 census, Boynton had a population of 161. The median age was 43.8 years. 26.1% of residents were under the age of 18 and 20.5% of residents were 65 years of age or older. For every 100 females there were 126.8 males, and for every 100 females age 18 and over there were 108.8 males age 18 and over.

0.0% of residents lived in urban areas, while 100.0% lived in rural areas.

There were 71 households in Boynton, of which 33.8% had children under the age of 18 living in them. Of all households, 43.7% were married-couple households, 16.9% were households with a male householder and no spouse or partner present, and 25.4% were households with a female householder and no spouse or partner present. About 24.0% of all households were made up of individuals and 9.9% had someone living alone who was 65 years of age or older.

There were 72 housing units, of which 1.4% were vacant. The homeowner vacancy rate was 0.0% and the rental vacancy rate was 0.0%.

=== 2000 census ===
As of the census of 2000, there were 274 people, 112 households, and 76 families residing in the town. The population density was 663.1 inhabitants per square mile (256.0/km^{2}). There were 139 housing units at an average density of 336.4 per square mile (129.9/km^{2}). The racial makeup of the town was 55.11% African American, 27.37% White, 6.20% Native American, 0.36% from other races, and 10.95% from two or more races. Hispanic or Latino of any race were 0.73% of the population.

There were 112 households, out of which 33.9% had children under the age of 18 living with them, 39.3% were married couples living together, 21.4% had a female householder with no husband present, and 32.1% were non-families. 31.3% of all households were made up of individuals, and 16.1% had someone living alone who was 65 years of age or older. The average household size was 2.45 and the average family size was 3.09.

In the town, the population was spread out, with 30.3% under the age of 18, 9.9% from 18 to 24, 21.9% from 25 to 44, 21.9% from 45 to 64, and 16.1% who were 65 years of age or older. The median age was 36 years. For every 100 females, there were 107.6 males. For every 100 females age 18 and over, there were 101.1 males.

The median income for a household in the town was $17,917, and the median income for a family was $25,000. Males had a median income of $25,417 versus $15,417 for females. The per capita income for the town was $18,419. About 22.4% of families and 25.5% of the population were below the poverty line, including 29.6% of those under the age of eighteen and 13.0% of those 65 or over.

== Economy ==
The local economy is based on agricultural services.
