= Lenna, Oklahoma =

- Unincorporated community
- Location within Oklahoma Location within the United States
- Coordinates: 35°22′35″N 95°46′10″W
- Country: United States
- State: Oklahoma
- County: McIntosh
- Elevation: 630 ft (190 m)
- Time zone: UTC-6 (Central (CST))
  - Summer (DST): UTC-5 (CDT)
- GNIS feature ID: 1100573

Lenna is a community in McIntosh County, Oklahoma, United States. The post office was established on January 4, 1902. It was named for Lenna Moore, a local Creek Indian.

== Etymology ==
Lenna started with a newly established post office around Stidham. Local officials held a contest to name the post office. People were invited to submit names for a drawing to select a list of names to be considered. Tom Moore dropped into the box all the names of his children. His daughter Lenna's name was drawn, thus Lenna (Full name Lennie Doddy Moore), Oklahoma. The book "Oklahoma Place Names" lists Lenna as being named after a local Creek Indian.
