= Stones Corner =

Stones Corner may refer to:

- Stones Corner, Oklahoma, United States
- Stones Corner, Queensland, Australia
- Stone's Corners, Ontario, Canada
