= George Washington Stidham =

American politician and judge (1817–1891)

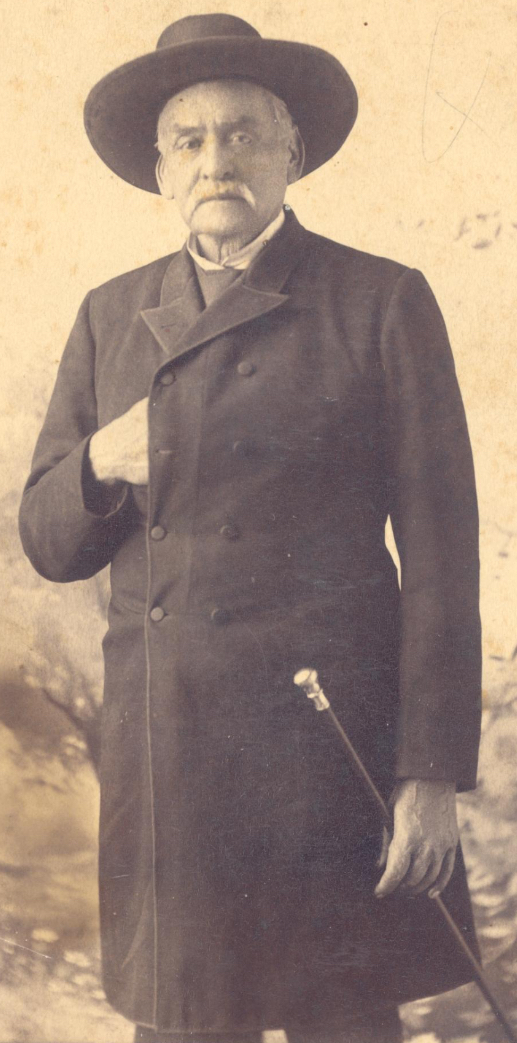
- Stidham, c. 1888 or 1889

Creek Delegate to the United States House of Representatives
- In office 1848–?

Chief of the Muscogee Nation

Chief Justice of the Muscogee Nation
- In office 1867 – March 1891

Personal details
- Born: November 17, 1817 Henry County, Alabama, US
- Died: March 1891 (aged 73) Muscogee Nation, US
- Occupation: politician, soldier, farmer, judge

George Washington Stidham I (November 17, 1817 – March 1891) was an American Muscogee politician, soldier, farmer and judge.

== Biography ==
Stidham was born on November 17, 1817, on an Indian reservation in Henry County, Alabama. His father Hopaychutke (died c. 1829) came to the United States from the British Isles and joined the Muscogee Nation. He did not attend school, and learned English at age 20, prior to which he spoke only in the Muscogee-Creek and Hitchiti-Mikasuki languages.

In 1837, during the Trail of Tears, Stidham and other Native Americans moved to Choska, Oklahoma. There, he worked as an interpreter, and got married in 1841. He was appointed as a Creek Delegate to the United States House of Representatives in 1848.

During the American Civil War, Stidham served in the Confederate States Army, under Albert Pike. To shelter refugees, he purchased a 6,000-acre property near Texarkana, Arkansas. The deeds were destroyed during the war, causing him to lose the land. He was the first to plant wheat in the Muscogee Nation. He also organized the first Masonic lodge in the Muscogee Nation.

Stidham provided ethnologist Albert Gatschet his interpretation of the story of origins of the Kasihta tribal town in both the Muscogee-Creek and Hitchiti-Mikasuki languages. The account which Stidham provided is the only long-form written specimen of the Hitchiti language to come out of Indian territory.

Stidham was elected Chief of the Muscogee Nation, but never took office. He served as Chief Justice of the Muscogee Nation from 1867, until dying in office in March 1891, aged 73. Stidham, Oklahoma is named for him. He is the father-in-law of George Washington Grayson.
