= Hitchita, Oklahoma =

Hitchita, Oklahoma Hecete (Creek)
- Town
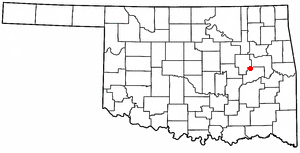
- Location in Oklahoma
- Coordinates: 35°31′11″N 95°45′06″W
- Country: United States
- State: Oklahoma
- County: McIntosh

Area
  - Total: 0.11 sq mi (0.29 km^{2})
  - Land: 0.11 sq mi (0.29 km^{2})
  - Water: 0 sq mi (0.00 km^{2})
- Elevation: 653 ft (199 m)

Population (2020)
  - Total: 60
  - Density: 541.8/sq mi (209.19/km^{2})
- Time zone: UTC-6 (Central (CST))
  - Summer (DST): UTC-5 (CDT)
- ZIP Code: 74438
- Area codes: 539/918
- FIPS code: 40-34900
- GNIS feature ID: 2412758

Hitchita (Creek: Hecete) is a town in McIntosh County, Oklahoma, United States. The Encyclopedia of Oklahoma History and Culture says that the town was named for a band of Muskhogean Indians that had been absorbed into the Creek tribe. The population of Hitchita was 60 at the 2020 census, down from 88 in 2010.

== Geography ==
Hitchita is located in northwestern McIntosh County, in the vicinity of the area known as the High Spring Mountains. It is less than a mile north of U.S. Route 266, which leads east-southeast 14 miles (23 km) to Checotah and west 6 miles (10 km) to Grayson.

According to the U.S. Census Bureau, the town of Hitchita has a total area of 0.1 square miles (0.26 km^{2}), all land. It is 1.5 miles (2.4 km) north of Oklahoma’s largest lake, Lake Eufaula, a reservoir on the Canadian River.

== Demographics ==
Historical population
Census	Pop.	Note	%±
1920	264		—
1930	228		−13.6%
1940	206		−9.6%
1950	141		−31.6%
1960	120		−14.9%
1970	160		33.3%
1980	126		−21.2%
1990	118		−6.3%
2000	113		−4.2%
2010	88		−22.1%
2020	60		−31.8%
U.S. Decennial Census

=== 2020 census ===
As of the 2020 census, Hitchita had a population of 60. The median age was 52.0 years. 23.3% of residents were under the age of 18 and 23.3% of residents were 65 years of age or older. For every 100 females there were 71.4 males, and for every 100 females age 18 and over there were 76.9 males age 18 and over.

0.0% of residents lived in urban areas, while 100.0% lived in rural areas.

There were 16 households in Hitchita, of which 25.0% had children under the age of 18 living in them. Of all households, 50.0% were married-couple households, 18.8% were households with a male householder and no spouse or partner present, and 31.3% were households with a female householder and no spouse or partner present. About 25.0% of all households were made up of individuals and 18.8% had someone living alone who was 65 years of age or older.

There were 33 housing units, of which 51.5% were vacant. The homeowner vacancy rate was 11.8% and the rental vacancy rate was 50.0%.

Racial composition as of the 2020 census
Race	Number	Percent
White	32	53.3%
Black or African American	0	0.0%
American Indian and Alaska Native	13	21.7%
Asian	0	0.0%
Native Hawaiian and Other Pacific Islander	0	0.0%
Some other race	0	0.0%
Two or more races	15	25.0%
Hispanic or Latino (of any race)	0	0.0%

=== 2000 census ===
As of the census of 2000, there were 113 people, 44 households, and 31 families residing in the town. The population density was 951.1 inhabitants per square mile (367.2/km^{2}). There were 51 housing units at an average density of 429.2 per square mile (165.7/km^{2}). The racial makeup of the town was 82.30% White, 0.88% African American, 9.73% Native American, and 7.08% from two or more races.

There were 44 households, out of which 27.3% had children under the age of 18 living with them, 63.6% were married couples living together, 4.5% had a female householder with no husband present, and 27.3% were non-families. 25.0% of all households were made up of individuals, and 15.9% had someone living alone who was 65 years of age or older. The average household size was 2.57 and the average family size was 3.09.

In the town, the population was spread out, with 21.2% under the age of 18, 8.8% from 18 to 24, 25.7% from 25 to 44, 22.1% from 45 to 64, and 22.1% who were 65 years of age or older. The median age was 42 years. For every 100 females, there were 88.3 males. For every 100 females age 18 and over, there were 93.5 males.

The median income for a household in the town was $20,536, and the median income for a family was $22,321. Males had a median income of $18,750 versus $12,500 for females. The per capita income for the town was $11,695. There were 14.3% of families and 22.6% of the population living below the poverty line, including 38.9% of under eighteens and 12.1% of those over 64.

== Notable person ==
- Actor Will Sampson (1933 - 1987) is buried in the Graves Creek Indian Cemetery north of town.
