= McIntosh County, Oklahoma =

County in Oklahoma, United States

- County
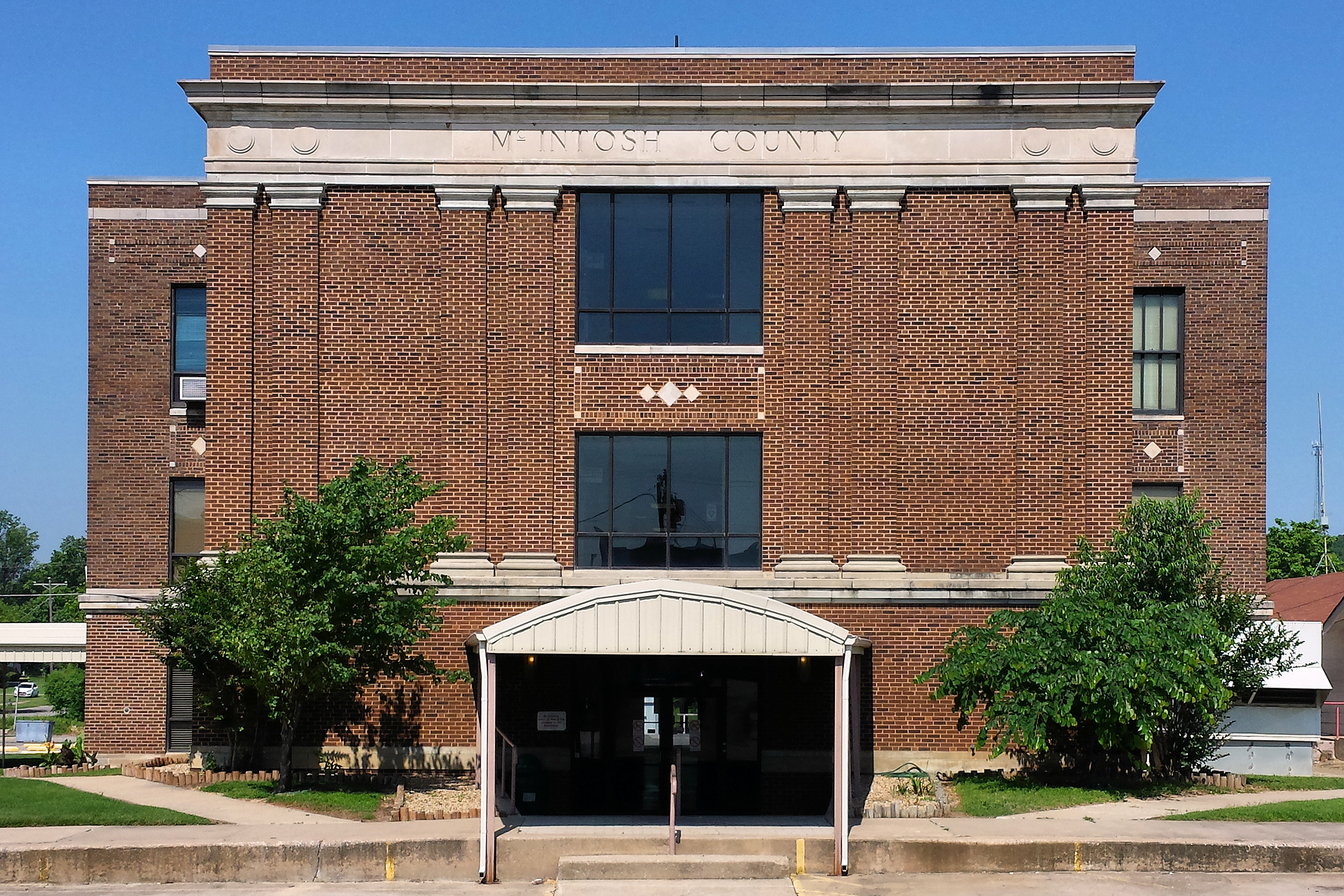
- The McIntosh County Courthouse in Eufaula.

- Location within the U.S. state of Oklahoma
- Coordinates: 35°23′N 95°40′W
- Country: United States
- State: Oklahoma
- Founded: 1907
- Named for: McIntosh family
- Seat: Eufaula
- Largest city: Checotah

Area
  - Total: 712 sq mi (1,840 km^{2})
  - Land: 618 sq mi (1,600 km^{2})
  - Water: 94 sq mi (240 km^{2}) 13%

Population (2020)
  - Total: 18,941
  - Estimate (2025): 19,758 ▲
  - Density: 30.6/sq mi (11.8/km^{2})
- Congressional district: 2nd
- Website: mcintosh.okcounties.org

McIntosh County is a county located in the U.S. state of Oklahoma. As of the 2020 census, the population was 18,941. Its county seat is Eufaula. The county is named for an influential Muscogee Creek family, whose members led the migration of the Lower Towns to Indian Territory and served as leaders for generations.

It is one of the counties within the jurisdiction of the federally recognized Muscogee (Creek) Nation; a small portion is within the jurisdiction of the Cherokee Nation of Oklahoma. It is named for the Creek chief William McIntosh (Tustunnuggee Hutke, c. 1775–1825) and his family.

== History ==
Many archaeological sites in McIntosh County date back to the Archaic period in North America (6000 BC - 1 AD). (Ed. note: the Encyclopedia of Oklahoma History and Culture defines this period as written here. The definition differs from that shown by the linked Wikipedia article.) Archaeologists have uncovered six sites since 2003 that predate these. These indigenous peoples predated any of Plains Indians, as well as the tribes that settled in the territory in the 1830s following Indian Removal from the American Southeast. Indigenous people may have made petroglyphs at the Handprint Site before the coming of the earliest European explorers.

In 1825, the Creek of the Lower Towns in the territory of present-day Georgia, led by William McIntosh, agreed by the Treaty of Indian Springs with the United States, to exchange their land in Georgia for land in Indian Territory. These Creek were a historic people who had originated in the Southeast and were part of the larger Creek Confederacy for centuries. Much of their new territory was included in what later became McIntosh County. Chief McIntosh was executed in Georgia in 1825 by order of the Creek National Council, which had forbidden such land cessions without agreement by the full council.

His descendants and followers of the Lower Towns migrated to Indian Territory. There the Creek repeatedly battled with the Osage, who had historically occupied a large area including this and up through present-day Missouri. In 1836, the Creek established North Fork Town on the Texas Road, about two miles east of present-day Eufaula, Oklahoma. A post office named Micco operated in North Fork Town from 1853 to 1886. This area became part of the Eufaula District of the Creek Nation.

Albert Pike, representing the Confederate States of America, signed treaties with the Chickasaw, Choctaw and Creek nations at the beginning of the Civil War. They allied with the Confederacy in the hopes of gaining an Indian state after the war. The Battle of Honey Springs, the largest battle of the war in what is now Oklahoma, was fought near Rentiesville. The Union Army won and took control of that part of Indian Territory north of the Arkansas River.

The Missouri-Kansas-Texas Railway built a line through this area in 1871–2, generally following the Texas Road. The communities of Checotah and Eufaula were established then. In 1904–5, the Missouri, Oklahoma and Gulf Railway (later merged into the Kansas, Oklahoma and Gulf Railway) laid a line through the northwestern part of the area, starting the community of Hitchita.

McIntosh County was established at statehood in 1907, when the population was 17,975. Before statehood, the area had been part of the Eufaula District of the Creek Nation. The county gained some land from Hughes County in 1915, but lost some land to Okmulgee County in 1918. The former moved the community of Hanna from Hughes County. The latter moved the towns of Grayson and Hoffman into Okmulgee County.

Between 1907 and 1909, the people of Checotah were involved in a dispute with nearby Eufaula known as the McIntosh County Seat War. After Checotah was designated as the new county seat, the people of Eufaula refused to hand over the county records. Soon after, a group of heavily armed men from Chectotah attempted to seize the records from the courthouse in Eufaula, but were beaten back and forced to surrender during the gunfight that followed. Eufaula was designated as the permanent seat of McIntosh County one year later.

The county is mostly within the jurisdiction of the federally recognized Muscogee (Creek) Nation, which oversees and represents its members. The far eastern portion of the county is within the jurisdiction of the Cherokee Nation of Oklahoma. Native Americans, mostly Muscogee, comprise more than 16% of the county's population.

== Geography ==
According to the U.S. Census Bureau, the county has a total area of 712 square miles (1,840 km^{2}), of which 618 square miles (1,600 km^{2}) is land and 94 square miles (240 km^{2}) (13%) is water. Much of the water surface is attributable to Eufaula Lake, the largest reservoir entirely within the state. Checotah is the nearest city to Lake Eufaula State Park (formerly Fountainhead State Park). The county is drained by the Deep Fork River, North Canadian River and Canadian River.

=== Major highways ===
- Interstate 40
- U.S. Highway 69
- U.S. Highway 266
- State Highway 9
- State Highway 52
- State Highway 72
- State Highway 150
- Indian Nation Turnpike

=== Adjacent counties ===
- Muskogee County (northeast)
- Haskell County (southeast)
- Pittsburg County (south)
- Hughes County (southwest)
- Okfuskee County (west)
- Okmulgee County (northwest)

== Demographics ==
Historical population
Census	Pop.	Note	%±
1910	20,961		—
1920	26,404		26.0%
1930	24,924		−5.6%
1940	24,097		−3.3%
1950	17,829		−26.0%
1960	12,371		−30.6%
1970	12,472		0.8%
1980	15,562		24.8%
1990	16,779		7.8%
2000	19,456		16.0%
2010	20,252		4.1%
2020	18,941		−6.5%
2025 (est.)	19,758	▲	4.3%
U.S. Decennial Census; 1790-1960 1900-1990; 1990-2000 2010

=== 2020 census ===
As of the 2020 census, the county had a population of 18,941. Of the residents, 19.6% were under the age of 18 and 26.9% were 65 years of age or older; the median age was 49.5 years. For every 100 females there were 97.8 males, and for every 100 females age 18 and over there were 95.7 males.

The racial makeup of the county was 67.6% White, 2.9% Black or African American, 17.2% American Indian and Alaska Native, 0.4% Asian, 0.7% from some other race, and 11.2% from two or more races. Hispanic or Latino residents of any race comprised 2.6% of the population.

There were 7,943 households in the county, of which 24.8% had children under the age of 18 living with them and 26.7% had a female householder with no spouse or partner present. About 28.6% of all households were made up of individuals and 15.9% had someone living alone who was 65 years of age or older.

There were 11,755 housing units, of which 32.4% were vacant. Among occupied housing units, 78.6% were owner-occupied and 21.4% were renter-occupied. The homeowner vacancy rate was 2.4% and the rental vacancy rate was 10.9%.

=== 2000 census ===
As of the census of 2000, there were 19,456 people, 8,085 households, and 5,683 families residing in the county. The population density was 12/km^{2} (31/mi^{2}). There were 12,640 housing units at an average density of 8/km^{2} (21/mi^{2}). The racial makeup of the county was 72.59% White, 4.06% Black or African American, 16.20% Native American, 0.14% Asian, 0.03% Pacific Islander, 0.35% from other races, and 6.63% from two or more races. 1.27% of the population were Hispanic or Latino of any race. 96.4% spoke English, 1.5% Muskogee and 1.5% Spanish as their first language.

There were 8,085 households, out of which 25.60% had children under the age of 18 living with them, 56.60% were married couples living together, 10.40% had a female householder with no husband present, and 29.70% were non-families. 26.70% of all households were made up of individuals, and 14.50% had someone living alone who was 65 years of age or older. The average household size was 2.37 and the average family size was 2.84.

In the county, the population was spread out, with 22.60% under the age of 18, 6.40% from 18 to 24, 22.30% from 25 to 44, 26.90% from 45 to 64, and 21.80% who were 65 years of age or older. The median age was 44 years. For every 100 females there were 91.70 males. For every 100 females age 18 and over, there were 89.30 males.

The median income for a household in the county was $25,964, and the median income for a family was $31,990. Males had a median income of $27,998 versus $19,030 for females. The per capita income for the county was $16,410. About 13.50% of families and 18.20% of the population were below the poverty line, including 24.80% of those under age 18 and 13.30% of those age 65 or over.

The most common self-identified ancestry groups in McIntosh County are:

- 24.9% English
- 19.8% Irish
- 15.8% German
- 2.7% French

== Politics ==
Despite a Democratic registration advantage as recently as the late 2010s, the county has not voted that way in presidential elections in the 21st century. Although Republican margins in the county have grown at a slower pace than in many other Oklahoma counties of this size, the party has nonetheless won greater than 60% of the county's vote in every election since 2012. In 2024, Donald Trump won over 75% of the county's vote, the strongest Republican performance in the county's history.

Voter Registration and Party Enrollment as of June 30, 2023
Party	Number of Voters	Percentage
Democratic	4,949	40.81%
Republican	5,512	45.45%
Others	1,666	13.74%
Total	12,127	100%

United States presidential election results for McIntosh County, Oklahoma
Year	Republican		Democratic		Third party(ies)	
Year	No.	%	No.	%	No.	%
1908	1,606	53.71%	1,236	41.34%	148	4.95%
1912	970	34.19%	1,325	46.70%	542	19.10%
1916	898	28.04%	1,743	54.43%	561	17.52%
1920	2,358	44.84%	2,642	50.24%	259	4.92%
1924	1,675	37.26%	2,723	60.58%	97	2.16%
1928	2,742	56.88%	2,044	42.40%	35	0.73%
1932	1,077	19.20%	4,533	80.80%	0	0.00%
1936	2,470	38.69%	3,898	61.06%	16	0.25%
1940	3,487	47.93%	3,771	51.84%	17	0.23%
1944	2,569	44.52%	3,190	55.28%	12	0.21%
1948	1,442	28.19%	3,674	71.81%	0	0.00%
1952	2,295	43.29%	3,007	56.71%	0	0.00%
1956	2,149	44.06%	2,728	55.94%	0	0.00%
1960	2,221	50.41%	2,185	49.59%	0	0.00%
1964	1,428	28.99%	3,497	71.01%	0	0.00%
1968	1,532	33.71%	1,759	38.70%	1,254	27.59%
1972	3,216	63.89%	1,686	33.49%	132	2.62%
1976	1,822	30.29%	4,145	68.91%	48	0.80%
1980	2,925	43.25%	3,654	54.03%	184	2.72%
1984	3,646	50.89%	3,479	48.56%	40	0.56%
1988	2,665	39.53%	4,041	59.94%	36	0.53%
1992	2,225	28.19%	4,184	53.01%	1,484	18.80%
1996	2,400	31.21%	4,219	54.86%	1,072	13.94%
2000	3,444	44.26%	4,206	54.05%	131	1.68%
2004	4,692	51.11%	4,488	48.89%	0	0.00%
2008	4,903	59.63%	3,320	40.37%	0	0.00%
2012	4,509	61.87%	2,779	38.13%	0	0.00%
2016	5,505	69.13%	2,123	26.66%	335	4.21%
2020	6,172	74.05%	2,031	24.37%	132	1.58%
2024	6,387	75.68%	1,937	22.95%	115	1.36%

== Economy ==
The county economy has been based primarily on farming and ranching. Corn was the principal crop until 1900, when cotton superseded it (as measured by acreage) around the middle of the 20th century. Other crops such as sorghum, oats and wheat also became important. However, construction of a dam and the resulting Eufaula Lake inundated much of the best cropland, causing a large-scale decline in agriculture. Cotton farming essentially ceased in the county by the mid-1970s. Cattle ranching has remained important, continuing to rise throughout the century. By 2000, the county reported 55,000 head of cattle.

Completion of Eufaula Lake in 1964 generated revenue from hydroelectric power, stimulated tourism, and produced companion businesses like boat building and general retail.

Mineral resources such as oil, natural gas, limestone, sand and gravel have also been important. While there are ample coal deposits, much of it has a high ash and sulfur content, so little except the low-sulfur type has been mined.

== Communities ==
=== Cities ===
- Checotah
- Eufaula (county seat)

=== Towns ===
- Hanna
- Hitchita
- Rentiesville
- Stidham
- Vernon

=== Census-designated places ===
- Duchess Landing
- Shady Grove
- Texanna

=== Unincorporated communities ===
- Lenna

== NRHP sites ==
The following sites in McIntosh County are listed on the National Register of Historic Places:

- Checotah Business District, Checotah
- Checotah City Hall, Checotah
- Checotah MKT Depot, Checotah
- C. L. Cooper Building, Eufaula
- Eufaula Armory, Eufaula
- Eufaula Business District, Eufaula
- First Soil Conservation District Dedication Site, Eufaula
- Honey Springs Battlefield, Rentiesville
- Johnson Lake Shelters, Warner
- McIntosh County Courthouse, Eufaula
- Methodist Episcopal Church, South, Checotah
- Oklahoma Odd Fellows Home at Checotah, Checotah
- Rock Front, Vernon
- Slippery Moss Shelter, Texanna
- Tabor House, Checotah
