= Shady Grove, McIntosh County, Oklahoma =

Shady Grove
- Census-designated place
- Location within Oklahoma Location within the United States
- Coordinates: 35°27′59″N 95°24′29″W
- Country: United States
- State: Oklahoma
- County: McIntosh

Area
  - Total: 17.03 sq mi (44.1 km^{2})
  - Land: 16.98 sq mi (44.0 km^{2})
  - Water: 0.05 sq mi (0.13 km^{2})
- Elevation: 709 ft (216 m)

Population (2020)
  - Total: 487
  - Density: 28.7/sq mi (11.1/km^{2})
- Time zone: UTC-6 (Central (CST))
  - Summer (DST): UTC-5 (CST)
- ZIP Code: 74426 (Checotah)
- FIPS code: 40-66520
- GNIS feature ID: 2408718

Shady Grove is an unincorporated community and census-designated place (CDP) in McIntosh County, Oklahoma, United States. The population was 487 at the 2020 census, up from 199 in 2010. This is not to be confused with Shady Grove in Cherokee County, or the Shady Grove in Pawnee County.

== Geography ==
The town is on Interstate 40 and U.S. Route 266, 7 miles (11 km) east of Checotah and 5 miles (8 km) west of Warner. It is bordered to the south by the Duchess Landing CDP.

Lake Eufaula, Oklahoma's largest lake, is 7 miles (11 km) to the south.

According to the U.S. Census Bureau, the Shady Grove CDP has a total area of 17.0 square miles (44 km^{2}), of which -0.05 square miles (0.13 km^{2}), or 0.29%, are water.

== Demographics ==
At the 2000 census, there were 185 people, 73 households, and 58 families residing in the CDP. The population density was 23.1 per square mile (8.9/km^{2}). There were 81 housing units at an average density of 10.1/sq mi (3.9/km^{2}). The racial makeup of the CDP was 68.65% White, 20.00% Native American, 0.54% Asian, and 10.81% from two or more races. Hispanic or Latino of any race were 0.54% of the population.

There were 73 households, of which 30.1% had children under the age of 18 living with them, 74.0% were married couples living together, 2.7% had a female householder with no husband present, and 20.5% were non-families. 20.5% of all households were made up of individuals, and 11.0% had someone living alone who was 65 years of age or older. The average household size was 2.53 and the average family size was 2.91.

The age distribution was 22.2% under the age of 18, 4.9% from 18 to 24, 25.4% from 25 to 44, 34.1% from 45 to 64, and 13.5% who were 65 years of age or older. The median age was 43 years. For every 100 females, there were 110.2 males. For every 100 females age 18 and over, there were 111.8 males.

The median household income was $53,125, and the median family income was $62,656. Males had a median income of $23,125 versus $22,734 for females. The per capita income for the CDP was $18,820. About 11.5% of families and 5.4% of the population were below the poverty line, including none of those under the age of eighteen or sixty five or over.

== Notable people ==
Musician Jody Reynolds grew up in the community.
