= George Washington Grayson =

Creek Nation businessman, merchant, and writer

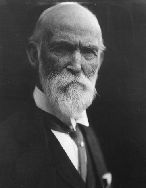

George Washington Grayson, also known as Yaha Tustunugge (Creek: Yvhv Tvstvnvke; May 12, 1843 – December 2, 1920), was a Muscogee Creek businessman, merchant, rancher, publisher of the Indian Journal, writer, and leader of the Creek Nation during the period when Indian Territory was dissolved to prepare of Oklahoma statehood. Of partial European ancestry, he identified as Creek and supported the nation, working for the proposed State of Sequoyah, to be a Native American state. It did not gain Congressional approval. In 1917, under revised conditions after tribal governments had been dissolved, Grayson was appointed by President Woodrow Wilson as chief of the Creek Nation, serving until his death. He had previously served as the Creek delegate to Congress.

== Background ==
George Washington Grayson (his Muskogee name was Yvhv Tvstvnvke, or "Wolf Warrior") was named for the first president of the United States; he was born in 1843 in Indian Territory to Jane "Jennie" (Wynne), a mixed-race (métis) Creek woman whose father John Wynne was of Welsh descent and mother Per-cin-ta Harrod was métis Creek, of Coweta town. His father was James Grayson, who was also of mixed-race. James' father was Tulwa Tustunugge –who descended from Robert Grierson, a Scots trader– and married Sin-o-gee of the Hillabee Town in the Creek Nation in the late 18th century. Grayson in his autobiography stressed his paternal heritage, noting the trader's success. By 1813 Grayson (as his name became spelled) owned a plantation and more than 70 African-American slaves. Through his mother, George Grayson was a member of the Tiger Clan and Coweta Town. Under the Creek matrilineal kinship system, children were considered born into the mother's clan, and inherited property and hereditary positions within her clan. Grayson was one of several children, and later went into business with his brothers Samuel and Pilot.

The Graysons had relatives in the towns of both the Upper Creek and Lower Creek in the American Southeast, who were divided during the Creek War. His band of ancestors had left the American Southeast years before the formal Indian Removal of the 1830s and lived in Arkansas and Indian Territory. Grayson attended an English-language Creek school, Asbury Manual Labor School, and Arkansas College (1858–60), developing a lifelong interest in history and literature. He was fluent in Muscogee and English.

== Military and career ==
During the American Civil War, Grayson served as a Confederate captain, leading a company of the 2nd Creek Mounted Volunteers. This was when he was given his war name of Yaha Tustunugge (Wolf Warrior). Most of the métis among the Creek, especially the Lower Creek, were allied with the Confederacy. Nearly half the tribe, consisting more of the towns of the Upper Creek, allied with the Union. Divisions among the groups persisted after the war. In the early 1870s, Grayson was a founder of the city of Eufaula, Oklahoma, when the railroad was constructed to serve the area.

Grayson's family represented both sides of the Creek Nation; his father's family from the Upper Creek and his mother's from the Lower Creek. From his early adult years, Grayson used his education and position as interpreter to become a power broker within the nation, as well as between it and white settlers, and the federal government. His widespread contacts also helped him develop "business partnerships with fellow Creeks, entrepreneurs from other Indian groups, and non-Indians." He and his brother Sam established Grayson Brothers, which grew to own a retail outlet, rental properties, a cotton gin, cattle ranches and other agricultural activities. They controlled the Indian Journal after 1880, the newspaper of the Creek Nation. By 1891, they were running 4,000 head of cattle on their properties. Grayson had other partnerships with his father-in-law G. W. Stidham and also Joseph M. Perryman.

He brokered "the distribution of goods, money, land, and political influence," in a sense related to the traditional role of headman in the tribe. But the dissolution of tribal government under the Curtis Act left the Creek National Council hollowed out by the time Grayson was appointed by the federal government as chief in 1917.

Working to support Creek nationalism, Grayson served as the Creek Nation's delegate to Congress and was part of the Sequoyah Constitutional Convention, which drafted a constitution to establish a Native American state. This effort was seeking to avoid folding the Indian Territory into the proposed state of Oklahoma, but it did not gain Congressional approval. Actions continued to extinguish Native American land title and dissolve tribal governments. Oklahoma was admitted as a state in 1907.

Grayson did not win the election for principal chief of the Creek in 1903. In 1908 he started to write his autobiography. Three years later he met John R. Swanton, an ethnographer with the Smithsonian Institution's Bureau of Ethnography. Grayson became his primary informant for his major study of the Creek people, as the leader knew much about customs and traditions that the younger people had never learned. Swanton highlighted Grayson's contribution to his Creek study. In 1913 Grayson also met with the Rodman Wanamaker expedition, led by Dr. Joseph K. Dixon, to preserve and memorialize the Native American cultures. Grayson provided a full history of the Creek, noting the many betrayals by European Americans.

After the tribal government was dissolved under the Curtis Act, Grayson was later appointed as chief by President Woodrow Wilson in 1917, serving until his death in 1920. He supervised the sale of the Creek Capitol to the county government after statehood. Perhaps feeling that tribal life had ended with the dissolution of its government, Grayson ended his autobiography with a history of the process of land allotment. This took place 20 years before his death.

== Marriage and family ==
He married Georgeanna Annie Stidham in 1869; she was the daughter of G.W. Stidham and his wife, part of the métis Creek community. They had nine children together and reportedly a happy marriage; he dedicated his autobiography to her. Their children were Orlena, Mabel, Walter, Eloise, Wash (Washington), Tsianina, Anna, Annette, and Daisy. Four of the Grayson children survived to adulthood: Lena (although she died at 22, leaving two children), Walter, Eloise and Tsianina, and lived near their parents with their own families.

He was the son-in-law of George Washington Stidham.
