= Duchess Landing, Oklahoma =

- Census-designated place
- Location within Oklahoma Location within the United States
- Coordinates: 35°23′54″N 95°24′59″W
- Country: United States
- State: Oklahoma
- County: McIntosh

Area
  - Total: 5.94 sq mi (15.38 km^{2})
  - Land: 5.94 sq mi (15.38 km^{2})
  - Water: 0 sq mi (0.00 km^{2})
- Elevation: 610 ft (190 m)

Population (2020)
  - Total: 157
  - Density: 26.4/sq mi (10.21/km^{2})
- Time zone: UTC-6 (Central (CST))
  - Summer (DST): UTC-5 (CST)
- ZIP Code: 74426 (Checotah)
- FIPS code: 40-21760
- GNIS feature ID: 2408691

Duchess Landing is an unincorporated community and census-designated place (CDP) in McIntosh County, Oklahoma, United States. The population was 157 at the 2020 census, up from 114 in 2010.

== Geography ==
Duchess Landing is in eastern McIntosh County, 11 miles (18 km) by road southeast of Checotah. It is bordered to the north by Shady Grove, and its southern border is the shore of Lake Eufaula, a reservoir on the Canadian River.

According to the U.S. Census Bureau, the Duchess Landing CDP has a total area of 5.9 square miles (15 km^{2}), all land.

== Demographics ==
Historical population
Census	Pop.	Note	%±
2000	95		—
2010	114		20.0%
2020	157		37.7%
U.S. Decennial Census

=== 2020 census ===
As of the 2020 census, Duchess Landing had a population of 157. The median age was 38.4 years. 26.8% of residents were under the age of 18 and 17.2% of residents were 65 years of age or older. For every 100 females there were 170.7 males, and for every 100 females age 18 and over there were 210.8 males age 18 and over.

0.0% of residents lived in urban areas, while 100.0% lived in rural areas.

There were 54 households in Duchess Landing, of which 40.7% had children under the age of 18 living in them. Of all households, 88.9% were married-couple households, 0.0% were households with a male householder and no spouse or partner present, and 11.1% were households with a female householder and no spouse or partner present. About 11.1% of all households were made up of individuals and 9.3% had someone living alone who was 65 years of age or older.

There were 63 housing units, of which 14.3% were vacant. The homeowner vacancy rate was 3.6% and the rental vacancy rate was 0.0%.

Racial composition as of the 2020 census
Race	Number	Percent
White	107	68.2%
Black or African American	1	0.6%
American Indian and Alaska Native	27	17.2%
Asian	1	0.6%
Native Hawaiian and Other Pacific Islander	0	0.0%
Some other race	1	0.6%
Two or more races	20	12.7%
Hispanic or Latino (of any race)	0	0.0%

=== 2000 census ===
As of the census of 2000, there were 95 people, 35 households, and 26 families residing in the CDP. The population density was 16.0 people per square mile (6.2/km^{2}). There were 40 housing units at an average density of 6.7/sq mi (2.6/km^{2}). The racial makeup of the CDP was 61.05% White, 36.84% Native American, and 2.11% from two or more races.

There were 35 households, out of which 37.1% had children under the age of 18 living with them, 74.3% were married couples living together, 2.9% had a female householder with no husband present, and 22.9% were non-families. 22.9% of all households were made up of individuals, and 8.6% had someone living alone who was 65 years of age or older. The average household size was 2.71 and the average family size was 3.11.

In the CDP, the population was spread out, with 28.4% under the age of 18, 5.3% from 18 to 24, 27.4% from 25 to 44, 29.5% from 45 to 64, and 9.5% who were 65 years of age or older. The median age was 36 years. For every 100 females, there were 90.0 males. For every 100 females age 18 and over, there were 83.8 males.

The median income for a household in the CDP was $13,750, and the median income for a family was $46,250. Males had a median income of $13,750 versus $30,156 for females. The per capita income for the CDP was $13,075. There were no families and 15.0% of the population living below the poverty line, including no under eighteens and none of those over 64.
