= Choska, Oklahoma =

Unincorporated community in Oklahoma, US

Coordinates: 35.854°N 95.629°W

Choska (Creek: Coskv) is an unincorporated community in Wagoner County, Oklahoma, United States. It is located on Oklahoma State Highway 104 at the junction of E. 0810 Road and N. 4150 Road, approximately two miles northeast of Haskell and six miles west-southwest of Porter. Choska is primarily a farming community consisting of sod farms, livestock and grain production.
