= Council Hill, Oklahoma =

Council Hill, Oklahoma Ueki-Hvlwe (Creek)
- Town
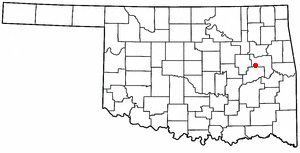
- Location in Oklahoma
- Coordinates: 35°33′21″N 95°39′09″W
- Country: United States
- State: Oklahoma
- County: Muskogee

Area
  - Total: 0.32 sq mi (0.82 km^{2})
  - Land: 0.32 sq mi (0.82 km^{2})
  - Water: 0 sq mi (0.00 km^{2})
- Elevation: 659 ft (201 m)

Population (2020)
  - Total: 108
  - Density: 341.2/sq mi (131.73/km^{2})
- Time zone: UTC-6 (Central (CST))
  - Summer (DST): UTC-5 (CDT)
- ZIP Code: 74428
- Area codes: 539/918
- FIPS code: 40-17550
- GNIS feature ID: 2412376

Council Hill is a town in Muskogee County, Oklahoma, United States. The population was 108 at the 2020 census, down from 158 in 2010.

== History ==
Council Hill began as a council house for the Creek Nation circa 1840, after the tribe had been forced to emigrate to Indian Territory. The Creeks named this location Weklwa Hulwe or "High Spring," and consider it their first capital. Smoke signals from the top of the hill announced calls for general council meetings to other Creek towns in the vicinity. After the outbreak of the Civil War, this place became the headquarters of the Creek Regiment of the Confederate Army, led by D. N. McIntosh.

After the Civil War, Council Hill became a simple farm community. The first post office was established in 1905. The Missouri, Oklahoma and Gulf Railroad (later the Kansas, Oklahoma and Gulf Railway) opened a line through the town in 1907 that enabled shipment of livestock and farm products to markets in the north and east. Cotton was the main crop, but other products included corn, potatoes, wheat, and oats. Oklahoma Pipeline Company built a pumping station at Council Hill for its line that carried crude oil from the Glenn Pool Oil Reserve to the Gulf Coast.

On November 20, 2025, Google announced a new data center to be built in Council Hill on hundreds of acres of land, as part of an investment of $9 billion spread across several Oklahoma sites.

== Geography ==
Council Hill is in western Muskogee County, 26 miles (42 km) by road southwest of Muskogee on State Highway 72. It is 11 miles (18 km) northwest of Checotah. The town's southern border is the McIntosh County line.

According to the U.S. Census Bureau, the town has a total area of 0.31 square miles (0.80 km^{2}), all land. The town drains west and south toward Lake Eufaula, a reservoir on the Canadian River.

== Demographics ==
Historical population
Census	Pop.	Note	%±
1920	206		—
1930	196		−4.9%
1940	171		−12.8%
1950	166		−2.9%
1960	130		−21.7%
1970	135		3.8%
1980	141		4.4%
1990	139		−1.4%
2000	129		−7.2%
2010	158		22.5%
2020	108		−31.6%
U.S. Decennial Census

=== 2020 census ===
As of the 2020 census, Council Hill had a population of 108. The median age was 40.5 years. 25.9% of residents were under the age of 18 and 23.1% of residents were 65 years of age or older. For every 100 females there were 86.2 males, and for every 100 females age 18 and over there were 81.8 males age 18 and over.

0.0% of residents lived in urban areas, while 100.0% lived in rural areas.

There were 47 households in Council Hill, of which 29.8% had children under the age of 18 living in them. Of all households, 36.2% were married-couple households, 17.0% were households with a male householder and no spouse or partner present, and 34.0% were households with a female householder and no spouse or partner present. About 27.6% of all households were made up of individuals and 10.7% had someone living alone who was 65 years of age or older.

There were 52 housing units, of which 9.6% were vacant. The homeowner vacancy rate was 5.3% and the rental vacancy rate was 0.0%.

Racial composition as of the 2020 census
Race	Number	Percent
White	86	79.6%
Black or African American	4	3.7%
American Indian and Alaska Native	9	8.3%
Asian	0	0.0%
Native Hawaiian and Other Pacific Islander	0	0.0%
Some other race	0	0.0%
Two or more races	9	8.3%
Hispanic or Latino (of any race)	1	0.9%

=== 2000 census ===
As of the census of 2000, there were 129 people, 48 households, and 36 families residing in the town. The population density was 408.6 inhabitants per square mile (157.8/km^{2}). There were 52 housing units at an average density of 164.7 per square mile (63.6/km^{2}). The racial makeup of the town was 79.07% White, 2.33% African American, 12.40% Native American, and 6.20% from two or more races.

There were 48 households, out of which 20.8% had children under the age of 18 living with them, 64.6% were married couples living together, 10.4% had a female householder with no husband present, and 25.0% were non-families. 25.0% of all households were made up of individuals, and 10.4% had someone living alone who was 65 years of age or older. The average household size was 2.69 and the average family size was 3.22.

In the town, the population was spread out, with 29.5% under the age of 18, 6.2% from 18 to 24, 20.9% from 25 to 44, 20.2% from 45 to 64, and 23.3% who were 65 years of age or older. The median age was 40 years. For every 100 females, there were 111.5 males. For every 100 females age 18 and over, there were 97.8 males.

The median income for a household in the town was $20,500, and the median income for a family was $21,875. Males had a median income of $37,917 versus $37,500 for females. The per capita income for the town was $9,018. There were 20.5% of families and 30.1% of the population living below the poverty line, including 47.1% of under eighteens and 35.1% of those over 64.
