= Broadway Bridge (Little Rock) =

- Coordinates: 34°45′08″N 92°16′27″W
- Carries: 4 lanes of US 70 / AR 365
- Crosses: Arkansas River
- Locale: Little Rock, Arkansas and North Little Rock, Arkansas
- Maintained by: Arkansas Department of Transportation

Characteristics
- Design: Arch bridge
- Longest span: 450 feet

History
- Construction end: 1923 (Original bridge); 2017 (Replacement bridge)
- Rebuilt: 1974

Statistics
- Daily traffic: 24,000
- Toll: Free

Location
- Interactive map of Broadway Bridge

The Broadway Bridge is an arch bridge that spans the Arkansas River connecting the cities of Little Rock, Arkansas and North Little Rock, Arkansas. It carries U.S. Route 70 (US 70) and Highway 365. The current bridge opened to traffic in March 2017. The original bridge was demolished in 2016. It was also an arch bridge and it opened in 1923.

== History ==
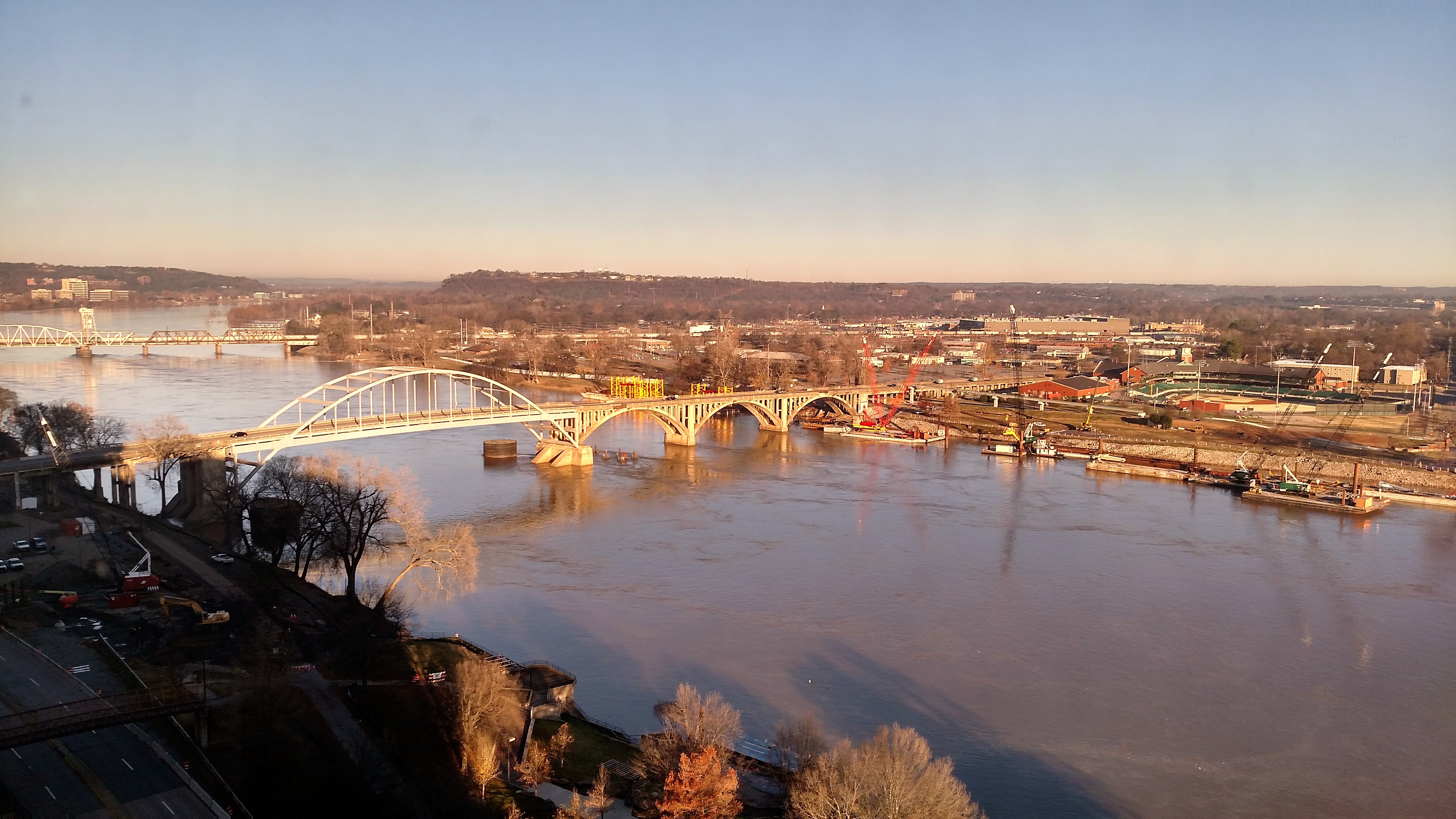
Original Broadway Bridge in 2015 prior to demolition

The original bridge began construction in 1921 and opened on March 14, 1923. An estimated 50,000 people attended the grand opening events. The original five-span structure was 2,783 feet long and 40 feet wide and provided 24.3 feet of vertical clearance. The original structure was an open-spandrel, deck arch bridge made of concrete and built by the Missouri Valley Bridge and Iron Company. The bridge was developed by the Broadway-Main Street Bridge District of Pulaski County, a commission created by state legislature for the purpose of constructing bridges across the Arkansas River at Broadway and at Main Street.

In 1974, two spans were demolished and replaced with a single through arch span. This was done to upgrade the bridge to McClellan–Kerr Arkansas River Navigation System standards.

The need to replace or rehabilitate the bridge was identified in 2010 as the structure was determined to be structurally deficient. Community desires were for a replacement bridge that included pedestrian/bicycle facilities, accommodations for a future streetcar line and an iconic design. In April 2011, the engineering firms Garver LLC and HNTB were selected to design a new bridge. The contractor is Massman Construction Company, who won the contract with a bid of $98.4 million. The selected design includes two 450-foot spans incorporating basket handle arches. Each arch is estimated to weigh 2,000 tons. The original bridge was permanently closed on September 28, 2016. The steel arch was demolished with explosives on October 11, 2016. The span remained standing until it was pulled down by tugboats five hours later. Two of three concrete arches from the original portion of the bridge were demolished on October 15, 2016, while the third arch remained standing. The new bridge was opened to the public on March 1, 2017.

== See also ==
- List of crossings of the Arkansas River
