= Hanna, Oklahoma =

- Town
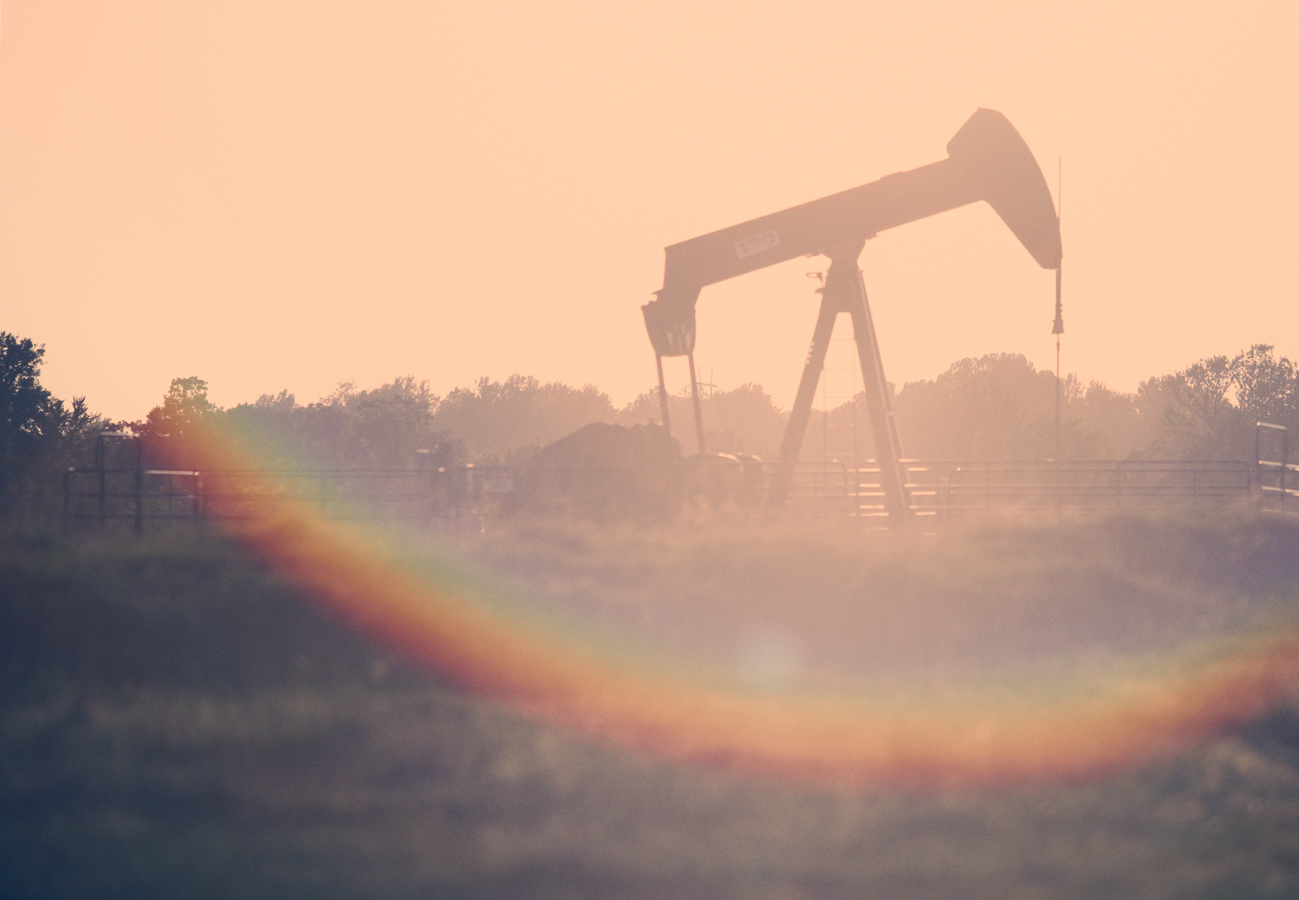
- Oil pump in Hanna

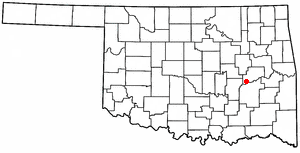
- Location in Oklahoma
- Coordinates: 35°12′08″N 95°53′21″W
- Country: United States
- State: Oklahoma
- County: McIntosh

Area
  - Total: 0.24 sq mi (0.62 km^{2})
  - Land: 0.24 sq mi (0.62 km^{2})
  - Water: 0 sq mi (0.00 km^{2})
- Elevation: 692 ft (211 m)

Population (2020)
  - Total: 102
  - Density: 424.8/sq mi (164.02/km^{2})
- Time zone: UTC-6 (Central (CST))
  - Summer (DST): UTC-5 (CDT)
- ZIP Code: 74845
- Area codes: 539/918
- FIPS code: 40-32350
- GNIS feature ID: 2412724

Hanna is a town in southwestern McIntosh County, Oklahoma, United States. Its population was 102 at the time of the 2020 census, down from 138 in 2010. It was named for Hanna Bullett, the daughter of a prominent early resident.

== Geography ==
Hanna is in southwestern McIntosh County, 21 miles (34 km) west-southwest of Eufaula, the county seat, and 3 miles (5 km) east-southeast of Vernon. According to the U.S. Census Bureau, Hanna has a total area of 0.24 square miles (0.62 km^{2}), all land. Mill Creek passes just north of the town, flowing east toward Eufaula Lake on the Canadian River.

=== Climate ===
Climate data for Hanna, Oklahoma
Month	Jan	Feb	Mar	Apr	May	Jun	Jul	Aug	Sep	Oct	Nov	Dec	Year
Mean daily maximum °F (°C)	49.4 (9.7)	54.9 (12.7)	64.8 (18.2)	74.5 (23.6)	80.7 (27.1)	88.0 (31.1)	93.8 (34.3)	93.5 (34.2)	85.5 (29.7)	76.0 (24.4)	63.1 (17.3)	52.5 (11.4)	73.1 (22.8)
Mean daily minimum °F (°C)	26.6 (−3.0)	31.2 (−0.4)	40.6 (4.8)	50.3 (10.2)	58.3 (14.6)	66.3 (19.1)	69.9 (21.1)	68.3 (20.2)	61.5 (16.4)	50.0 (10.0)	40.1 (4.5)	30.4 (−0.9)	49.5 (9.7)
Average precipitation inches (mm)	1.7 (43)	2.4 (61)	4.1 (100)	4.1 (100)	6.0 (150)	3.7 (94)	2.8 (71)	2.6 (66)	4.6 (120)	4.2 (110)	3.5 (89)	2.4 (61)	42.1 (1,065)
Source 1: weather.com
Source 2: Weatherbase.com

== Demographics ==
Historical population
Census	Pop.	Note	%±
1920	460		—
1930	360		−21.7%
1940	344		−4.4%
1950	325		−5.5%
1960	233		−28.3%
1970	181		−22.3%
1980	157		−13.3%
1990	99		−36.9%
2000	133		34.3%
2010	138		3.8%
2020	102		−26.1%
U.S. Decennial Census

=== 2020 census ===
As of the 2020 census, Hanna had a population of 102. The median age was 37.5 years. 28.4% of residents were under the age of 18 and 12.7% of residents were 65 years of age or older. For every 100 females there were 112.5 males, and for every 100 females age 18 and over there were 121.2 males age 18 and over.

0.0% of residents lived in urban areas, while 100.0% lived in rural areas.

There were 42 households in Hanna, of which 52.4% had children under the age of 18 living in them. Of all households, 42.9% were married-couple households, 19.0% were households with a male householder and no spouse or partner present, and 23.8% were households with a female householder and no spouse or partner present. About 11.9% of all households were made up of individuals and 4.8% had someone living alone who was 65 years of age or older.

There were 45 housing units, of which 6.7% were vacant. The homeowner vacancy rate was 0.0% and the rental vacancy rate was 0.0%.

Racial composition as of the 2020 census
Race	Number	Percent
White	51	50.0%
Black or African American	6	5.9%
American Indian and Alaska Native	28	27.5%
Asian	0	0.0%
Native Hawaiian and Other Pacific Islander	0	0.0%
Some other race	3	2.9%
Two or more races	14	13.7%
Hispanic or Latino (of any race)	3	2.9%
