= I-40 bridge disaster =

2002 collision in Webbers Falls, Oklahoma, US

I-40 Bridge disaster
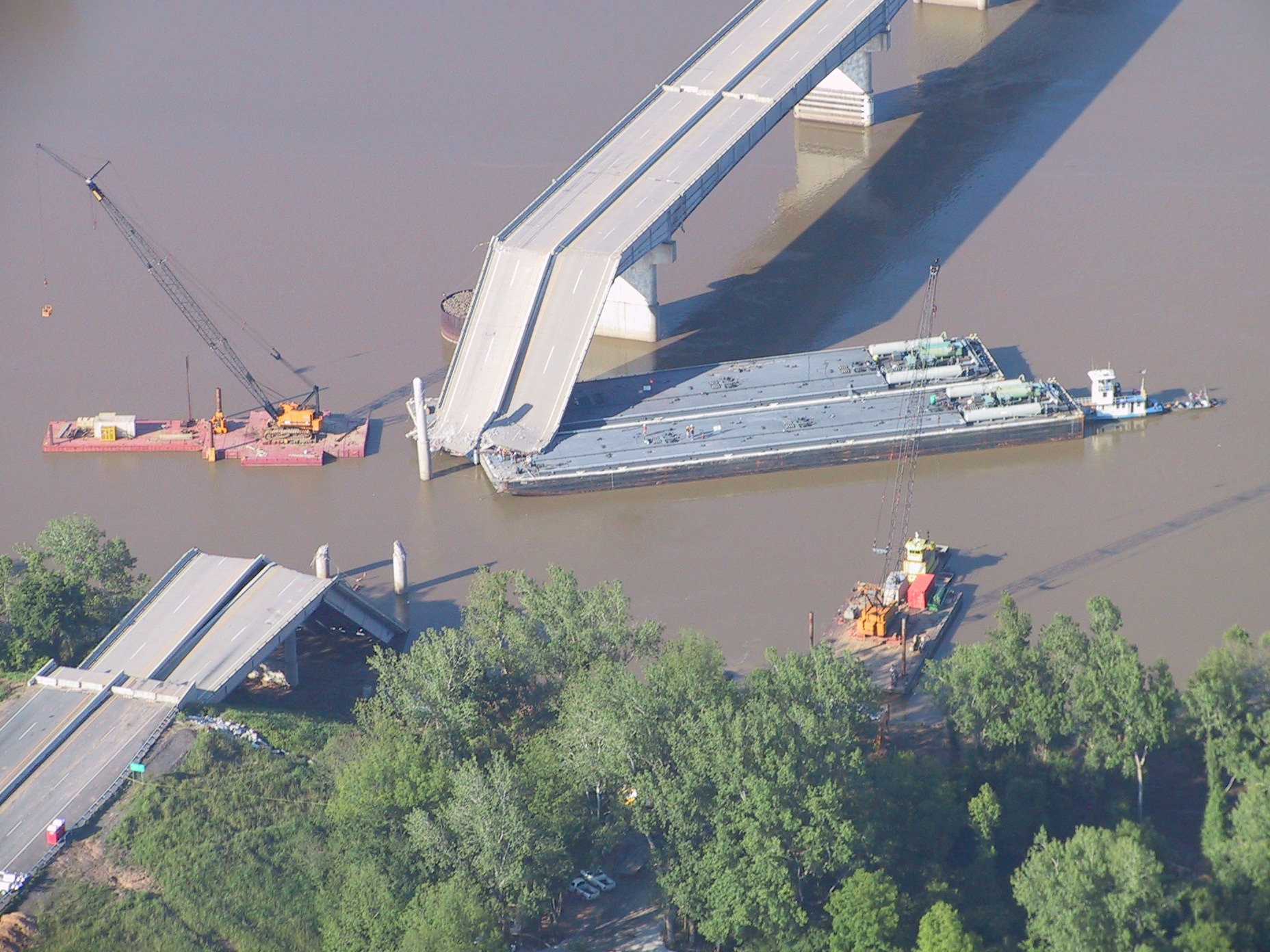
- The collapsed section of the Interstate 40 bridge, May 31, 2002
- Date: May 26, 2002
- Time: 7:45 a.m. (CDT)
- Location: Webbers Falls, Muskogee County, Oklahoma, United States; 35.4861°N 95.0991°W
- Type: Accident
- Cause: Towboat collision with a bridge pier, caused by captain losing consciousness
- Deaths: 14
- Injuries: 11

A bridge collapse occurred southeast of Webbers Falls, Oklahoma, United States, at 7:45 a.m. on May 26, 2002. Freight barges being transported on the Arkansas River collided with a pier supporting the Interstate 40 road bridge crossing the river. The resulting failure of the supports caused a section of the bridge to collapse, killing 14 people and injuring another 11. The collision was determined to have resulted from the captain of the barges' towboat losing consciousness.

== Collision and collapse ==
Joe Dedmon, captain of the towboat Robert Y. Love, was transporting two empty barges on the Arkansas River. While traversing the Robert S. Kerr Reservoir, Dedmon experienced syncope and lost control of the tow. This caused the barges he was towing to collide with a pier of the Interstate 40 bridge crossing the reservoir. A 580-foot (180 m) section of the bridge collapsed, plunging into the water. It was raining heavily at the time of the collapse, but the rain subsided soon afterward. By the time traffic stopped and drivers became aware of the missing road, eight passenger vehicles and three semi-trucks had fallen into the river or on collapsed bridge pieces. Fourteen people died and eleven others were injured when the cars and tractor-trailers fell from the bridge. Survivors were aided by fishermen who were participating in a bass fishing tournament in the river near the bridge.

== Rescue and recovery ==
Three people that had fallen into the river in their vehicles were able to get out and swim to shore. Bass fishermen participating in a tournament on the water saw the disaster occurring and attempted to aid the victims and stop the cars and trucks they witnessed driving towards the bridge failure. One fisherman along the river shot a flare at a tractor-trailer driver in an attempt to get the truck to stop. Others threw ropes at people in vehicles to attempt to pull them from the water.

A two-time convicted felon named William James Clark impersonated a U.S. Army captain at the disaster scene for two days. Clark's efforts included directing FBI agents and appropriating vehicles and equipment, purportedly for the rescue effort, before fleeing the scene. Clark was later apprehended in Canada and was later sentenced to 36 months for impersonating a federal officer and to 70 months for possessing a firearm.

An estimated 20,000 vehicles per day were rerouted for about two months while crews rebuilt the bridge. Traffic resumed July 29, 2002—two months after the disaster. The reopening set a new national record for such a project, which would normally be expected to take six months.

== Investigation and litigation ==
It was reported that the towboat Robert Y. Love had problems with steering back in 1994, although Coast Guard Lt. j.g. Natalie Magnino stated that the 1994 problem was caused by debris that had jammed the rudder and was not the result of mechanical failure or captain error.

The National Transportation Safety Board stated in 2004 that the collapse was due to Dedmon's loss of consciousness, possibly due to an unforeseeable abnormal heart rhythm. Indiana University Professor of Medicine Douglas Zipes agreed with this explanation and stated in a letter to Dedmon's attorney that it was likely that Dedmon had ventricular tachycardia, which caused him to black out. As a result of the accident the Safety Board recommended that the U.S. Coast Guard Research and Development Center evaluate the utility and effectiveness of alerter systems within the wheelhouse of inland towing vessels. This was in addition to warning systems for motorists to stop in the case of a partial or total bridge collapse.

In May 2003, victims of the bridge collapse settled a lawsuit with the towboat company. The Mississippi-based company Magnolia Marine Transport Co. settled with the families of the 14 who died and those injured for an undisclosed amount. This is separate from the other suits against the company by the state of Oklahoma and by MBO Video, whose fiber optic cables were severed by the collapse.

== Memorials ==
The town created a memorial statue in honor of the victims and the event, a 14-foot (4.3 m) tall bronze sculpture that incorporates pieces of the wreckage and is topped by a young girl reaching upwards to release a dove. The young girl represents the youngest victim, a 3-year-old girl. It was created by Shahla Rahimi-Reynolds, who was chosen by the Webbers Falls Committee to design the memorial, which also uses 14 granite plaques to memorialize each victim. The memorial was dedicated on May 26, 2003. The memorial cost the state almost $150,000.

Webbers Falls marked the 15th anniversary of the bridge collapse with a special ceremony at the Webbers Falls Historical City Park, with the monument in honor of those who were affected by the accident.

== See also ==
- Big Bayou Canot train disaster – Amtrak train plunged off bridge that had been hit by a barge.
- Granville rail disaster – train hits piers
- List of bridge disasters
- List of crossings of the Arkansas River
- Queen Isabella Memorial Bridge – a similar accident in 2001
- Francis Scott Key Bridge collapse – a similar accident in 2024
- Tasman Bridge disaster – ore-carrier hit bridge piers causing collapse of roadway
