= Shady Grove, Cherokee County, Oklahoma =

Shady Grove
- Census-designated place
- Location within Cherokee County and the state of Oklahoma
- Coordinates: 35°57′45″N 95°07′34″W
- Country: United States
- State: Oklahoma
- County: Cherokee

Area
  - Total: 12.59 sq mi (32.61 km^{2})
  - Land: 12.59 sq mi (32.61 km^{2})
  - Water: 0 sq mi (0.00 km^{2})
- Elevation: 761 ft (232 m)

Population (2020)
  - Total: 519
  - Density: 41.2/sq mi (15.92/km^{2})
- Time zone: UTC-6 (Central (CST))
  - Summer (DST): UTC-5 (CST)
- FIPS code: 40-66510
- GNIS feature ID: 2408717

Shady Grove is an unincorporated community and census-designated place (CDP) in Cherokee County, Oklahoma, United States. The population was 556 at the 2010 census. This is not to be confused with the similarly-named Shady Grove in McIntosh County, or the Shady Grove in Pawnee County.

== Geography ==
Shady Grove is located in western Cherokee County. While there is no particular town center, there is a Shady Grove School along Shady Grove Road in the valley of Double Spring Creek in the northern part of the CDP. Tahlequah, the Cherokee County seat, is 11 miles (18 km) to the southeast. Hulbert, the closest town, is 1 mile (1.6 km) west of the western edge of Shady Grove and 4.5 miles (7.2 km) southwest of the Shady Grove School.

According to the United States Census Bureau, the CDP has a total area of 12.6 square miles (32.6 km^{2}), all land.

== Demographics ==
Historical population
| Census | Pop. | Note | %± |
|---|---|---|---|
| 2000 | 484 | | — |
| 2010 | 556 | | 14.9% |
| 2020 | 519 | | −6.7% |
U.S. Decennial Census

As of the census of 2000, there were 484 people, 181 households, and 131 families residing in the CDP. The population density was 38.4 inhabitants per square mile (14.8/km^{2}). There were 200 housing units at an average density of 15.9/sq mi (6.1/km^{2}). The racial makeup of the CDP was 57.23% White, 0.41% African American, 35.95% Native American, 0.83% from other races, and 5.58% from two or more races. Hispanic or Latino of any race were 3.93% of the population.

There were 181 households, out of which 35.4% had children under the age of 18 living with them, 60.2% were married couples living together, 9.9% had a female householder with no husband present, and 27.1% were non-families. 24.9% of all households were made up of individuals, and 8.8% had someone living alone who was 65 years of age or older. The average household size was 2.67 and the average family size was 3.22.

In the CDP, the population was spread out, with 29.3% under the age of 18, 8.3% from 18 to 24, 30.6% from 25 to 44, 21.3% from 45 to 64, and 10.5% who were 65 years of age or older. The median age was 34 years. For every 100 females, there were 91.3 males. For every 100 females age 18 and over, there were 95.4 males.

The median income for a household in the CDP was $27,273, and the median income for a family was $34,196. Males had a median income of $20,938 versus $15,000 for females. The per capita income for the CDP was $11,343. About 15.0% of families and 17.5% of the population were below the poverty line, including 22.8% of those under age 18 and 8.5% of those age 65 or over.
