= Shady Grove, Pawnee County, Oklahoma =

Shady Grove
- Unincorporated community
- Location of Shady Grove, Oklahoma
- Coordinates: 36°11′23″N 96°17′17″W
- Country: United States
- State: Oklahoma
- County: Pawnee

Area
  - Total: 0.018 sq mi (0.047 km^{2})
- Elevation: 807 ft (246 m)

Population (2010)
  - Total: 2
  - Density: 110/sq mi (43/km^{2})
- Time zone: UTC-6 (Central (CST))
  - Summer (DST): UTC-5 (CST)
- GNIS feature ID: 2413273

Shady Grove was a town in southeastern Pawnee County, Oklahoma, United States, near Lake Keystone. The population was 44 at the 2000 census. In the 2010 census, its population had dropped to 2, and a 2011 news report stated that one of those two had left since the census, leaving it the smallest town in the state. The report explained that the owner of the seven mobile home lots that made up the town had incorporated it in 1997 to avoid being absorbed into a larger municipality, but had dissolved the town in 2006 and died in 2009, and nearly all the tenants had departed. This is not to be confused with the similarly named Shady Grove in Cherokee County, or the Shady Grove in McIntosh County.

== Geography ==
According to the United States Census Bureau, the town has a total area of 0.018 square miles (0.047 km^{2}), all land.

== Demographics ==
As of the census of 2000, there were 44 people, 18 households, and 14 families residing in the town. The population density was 2,433.4 inhabitants per square mile (939.5/km^{2}). There were 19 housing units at an average density of 1,050.8 per square mile (405.7/km^{2}). The racial makeup of the town was 84.09% White and 15.91% Native American.

There were 18 households, out of which 33.3% had children under the age of 18 living with them, 50.0% were married couples living together, 22.2% had a female householder with no husband present, and 16.7% were non-families. 11.1% of all households were made up of individuals, and 5.6% had someone living alone who was 65 years of age or older. The average household size was 2.44 and the average family size was 2.67.

In the town, the population was spread out, with 29.5% under the age of 18, 6.8% from 18 to 24, 20.5% from 25 to 44, 29.5% from 45 to 64, and 13.6% who were 65 years of age or older. The median age was 38 years. For every 100 females, there were 76.0 males. For every 100 females age 18 and over, there were 93.8 males.

The median income for a household in the town was $32,500, and the median income for a family was $50,625. Males had a median income of $46,250 versus $40,625 for females. The per capita income for the town was $23,688. There were no families and 9.1% of the population living below the poverty line, including no under eighteens and 40.0% of those over 64.
