= Oklahoma State Highway 104 =

State highway in Oklahoma, United States

State Highway 104
- SH 104 highlighted in red

Route information
- Maintained by ODOT
- Length: 7.02 mi (11.30 km)
- Existed: May 2, 1955–present

Major junctions
- South end: US 64 / SH-72 in Haskell
- North end: SH-51B southwest of Red Bird

Location
- Country: United States
- State: Oklahoma

Highway system
- Oklahoma State Highway System; Interstate; US; State; Turnpikes
← SH-102	→ SH-105

State Highway 104, abbreviated SH-104 or OK-104, is a short state highway in the U.S. state of Oklahoma. It travels for 2.08 miles (3.35 km) in Muskogee County and 4.94 miles (7.95 km) in Wagoner County, for a total length of 7.02 miles (11.30 km). It has no lettered spur routes.

State Highway 104 was established in its current form in 1955.

== Route description ==
State Highway 104 begins in Haskell at an intersection with US-64/SH-72. SH-104 heads eastward from here, crossing the Arkansas River at a slight angle (and crossing from Muskogee into Wagoner county while doing so). It then turns north, then east, before turning north again along 317th East Avenue. It passes through unincorporated Choska on this avenue. One mile (1.6 km) north of Choska, the highway turns east on E. 221st St, which it follows for another mile. SH-104 then turns back to the north along 333rd E. Avenue. It ends at SH-51B at the incorporated place of Stones Corner, southwest of Red Bird.

== History ==
SH-104 was commissioned in its present form on May 2, 1955. The only change to the route was to transfer it to a new Arkansas River bridge, which occurred July 12, 1982. No further changes have occurred since.

== Junction list ==
County	Location	mi	km	Destinations	Notes
Muskogee	Haskell	0.00	0.00	US 64 / SH-72	Southern terminus
Wagoner		7.02	11.30	SH-51B	Northern terminus
1.000 mi = 1.609 km; 1.000 km = 0.621 mi
