= First United Methodist Church (Checotah, Oklahoma) =

Historic church in Oklahoma, United States

- Methodist Episcopal Church, South
- U.S. National Register of Historic Places
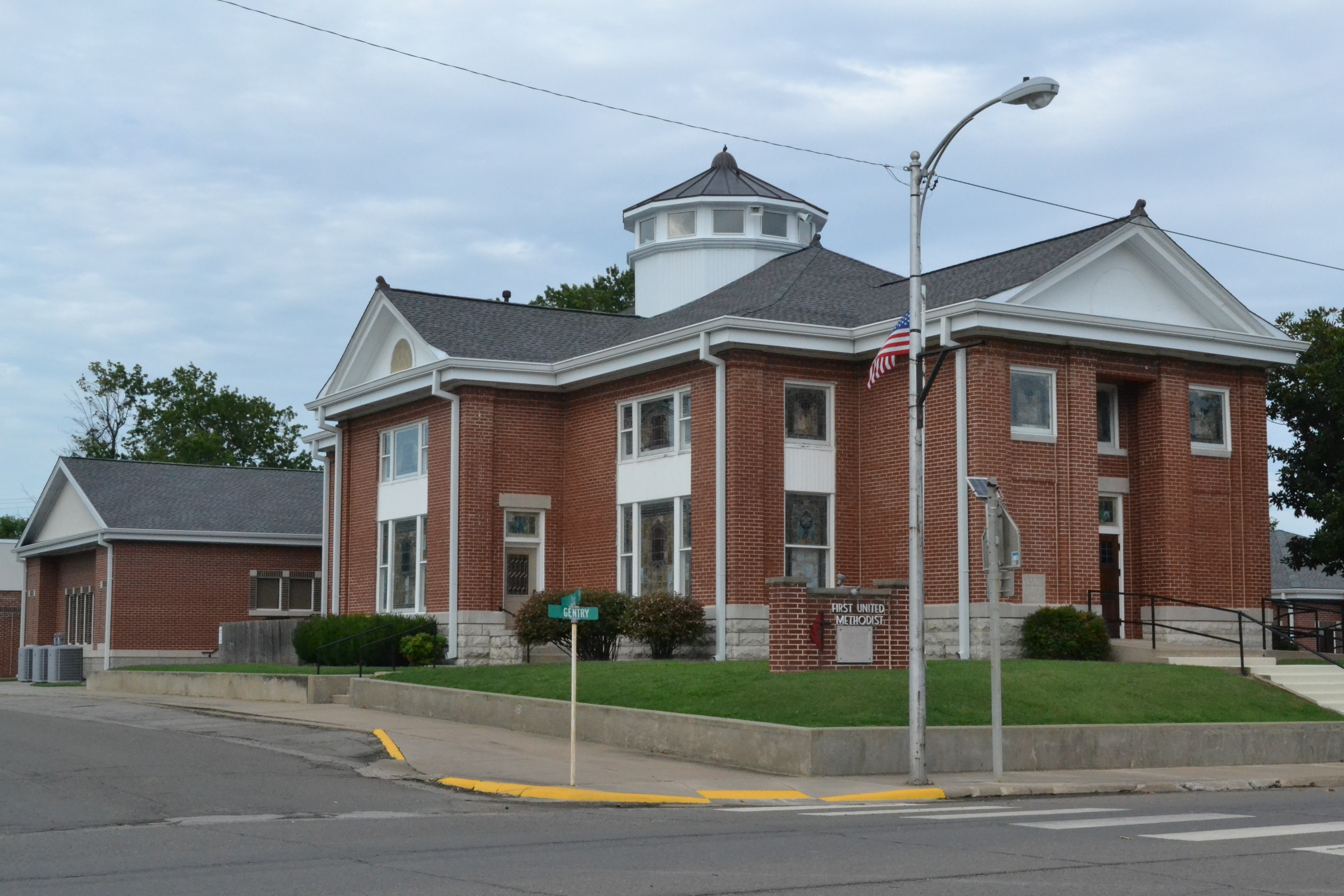

- Location within Oklahoma Location within the United States
- Location: 419 W. Gentry St., Checotah, Oklahoma
- Coordinates: 35°28′14″N 95°31′28″W
- Area: less than one acre
- Built: 1917
- Built by: William Alston
- Architect: John Gaisford
- Architectural style: Federalist Revival
- NRHP reference No.: 84000462
- Added to NRHP: November 13, 1984

The First United Methodist Church, formerly the Methodist Episcopal Church, South is a historic church in Checotah, Oklahoma. It was built in 1917 and was added to the National Register of Historic Places in 1984.

It is a two-story brick building. Its sanctuary has an unusual "corner pulpit from which four aisles radiate reminiscent of early 'meetinghouse' styles. It rises two stories with a curved balcony surrounding the rear sides of the sanctuary. All millwork and furniture are of oak. The plank floors are white pine."
