= Stones Corner, Oklahoma =

- Unincorporated community
- Location within Oklahoma
- Coordinates: 35°52′16″N 95°36′24″W
- Country: United States
- State: Oklahoma
- County: Wagoner
- Elevation: 561 ft (171 m)
- Time zone: UTC-6 (Central (CST))
  - Summer (DST): UTC-5 (CDT)
- Area codes: 539 & 918
- GNIS feature ID: 1100856

Stones Corner is an unincorporated community in Wagoner County, Oklahoma, United States. It is located at the junction of Oklahoma State highways 51B and 104, approximately 4 1/2 miles west of Porter, and seven miles south of Coweta. Primarily a farming community, it once was home to a farm equipment dealer and repair shop, and Stones Corner filling station and grocery, until the latter burned down in the late 1980s.
