= Oklahoma State Highway 72 =

State highway in Oklahoma, United States

State Highway 72

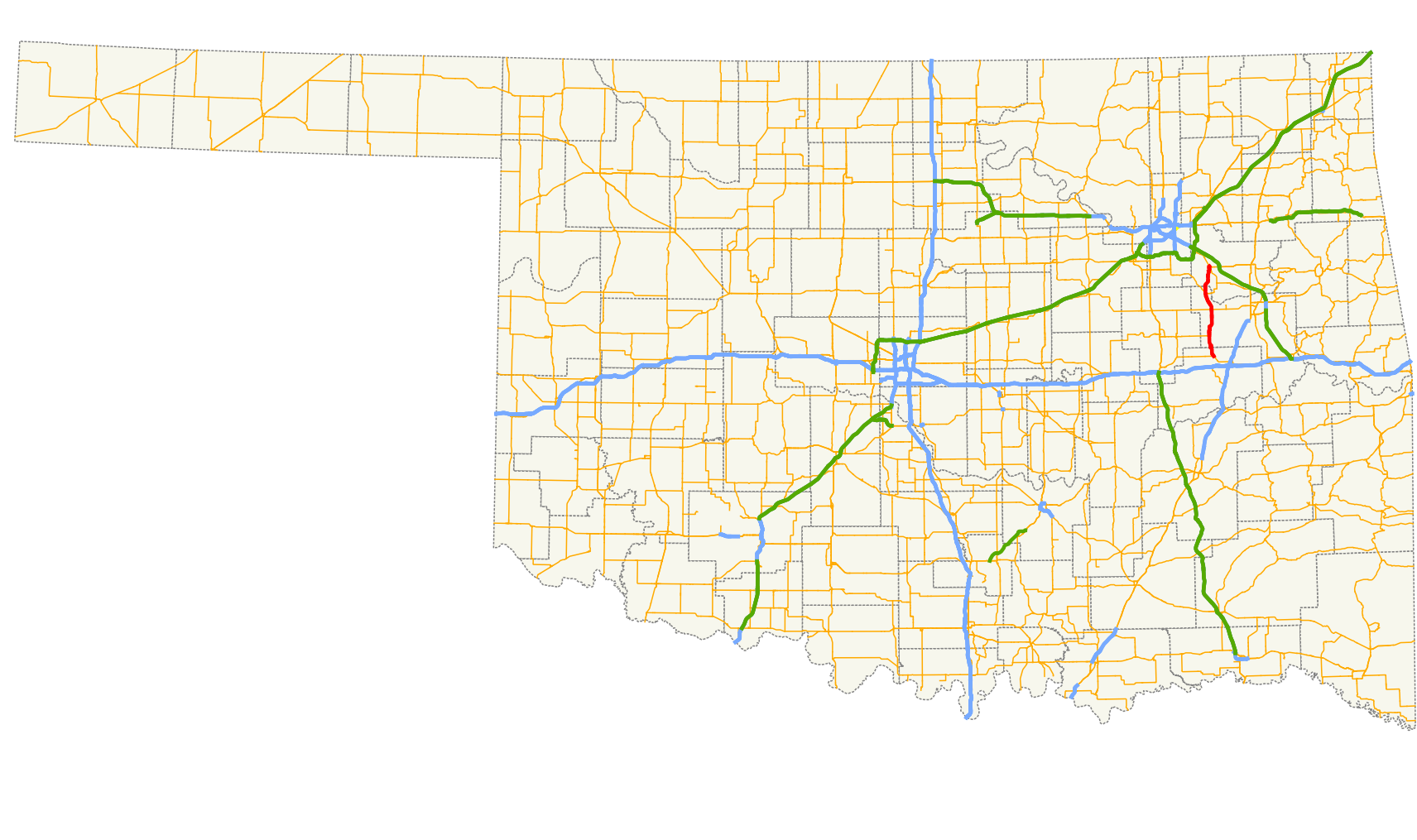

Route information
- Maintained by ODOT
- Length: 32.9 mi (52.9 km)

Major junctions
- South end: US 266 west of Checotah
- US 62 from Boynton to Jamesville; US 64 from Jamesville to Haskell
- North end: SH-51 in Coweta

Location
- Country: United States
- State: Oklahoma

Highway system
- Oklahoma State Highway System; Interstate; US; State; Turnpikes
← SH-71	→ SH-73

State Highway 72 (abbreviated SH-72 or OK-72) is a state highway in the U.S. state of Oklahoma. It runs from north to south through the east-central part of the state, with a length of almost 33 miles (53 km). It does not have any lettered spur routes.

== Route description ==
SH-72 begins at U.S. Highway 266 west of Checotah and heads north, passing through Council Hill after 4 miles (6.4 km). Two miles south of Boynton, it meets US-62, with which it starts a duplex. Past Boynton, the concurrent routes have a junction with US-64 and SH-16; here, US-62 splits off of SH-72 and US-64 joins it.

Near Haskell, US-64 splits off SH-72, headed towards Tulsa. SH-72 continues northward to cross the Arkansas River, to Coweta.

== History ==
The clearance below the railroad underpass in downtown Coweta near the junction with SH-51 was previously only 13 ft (4.0 m). Between February 2009 and April 2010, the crossing was rehabilitated and expanded, with the clearance increased to 17 ft 1 in (5.21 m).

== Junction list ==
County	Location	mi	km	Destinations	Notes
McIntosh		0.0	0.0	US-266	Southern terminus
Muskogee		7.7	12.4	US-62	
Muskogee	Jamesville	16.8	27.0	US-62	
Muskogee	Jamesville	16.8	27.0	US-64	
Muskogee	Jamesville	16.8	27.0	SH-16	
Muskogee	Haskell	22.7	36.5	SH-104	
Muskogee	Haskell	23.1	37.2	US-64	
Wagoner	Coweta	32.1	51.7	SH-51B	
Wagoner	Coweta	32.9	52.9	SH-51	Northern terminus
1.000 mi = 1.609 km; 1.000 km = 0.621 mi: Concurrency terminus
