= John Mack Bridge =

Concrete bridge in Wichita, Kansas, United States

- U.S. National Register of Historic Places
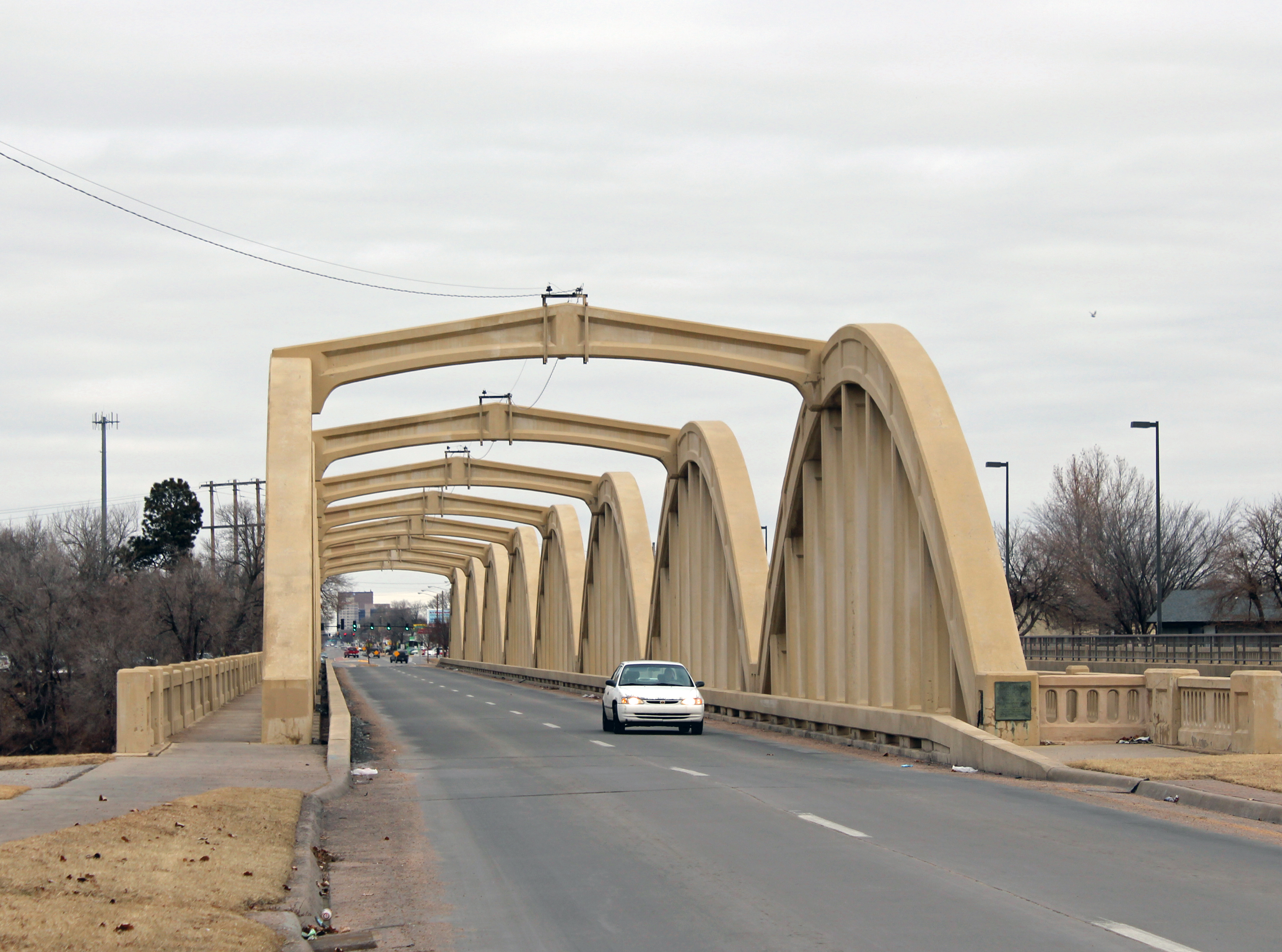
- The John Mack Bridge in 2023

- Location within Kansas Location within the United States
- Location: Wichita, Kansas, U.S.
- Coordinates: 37°38′40.45″N 97°20′7.91″W
- Built: 1930–1931
- Architect: James Barney Marsh; Edward Tomlinson
- NRHP reference No.: 91002018
- Added to NRHP: January 22, 1992

The John Mack Bridge is an 800-foot (240 m) reinforced concrete bridge in Wichita, Kansas, (Note: The location was outside the city limits of Wichita until the early 1950s.) United States, designed by architect James Barney Marsh. Constructed between 1930 and 1931, it spans the Arkansas River along South Broadway Street. The bridge was one of many built in Marsh's patented 1911 "Rainbow Arch" (or "Marsh Arch") style; however, it is today one of fewer than a dozen still standing and is the longest.

Its namesake was John C. Mack (1867–1930), a senator, newspaper publisher, and member of the state highway commission who was known as the "father of good Kansas roads".

== History ==
Tentatively called the "South Lawrence Street Bridge" in plan specifications, the bridge was designed by the Marsh Engineering Company of Des Moines, Iowa, in 1929. Its purpose was to replace a metal truss bridge built at the site in 1883, which had fallen into disrepair and could not keep up with growing traffic congestion in the area. Senator John C. Mack was credited with securing the contract for the new bridge to be built, and as such, the bridge was named after him.

On January 30, 1930, construction of the John Mack Bridge began. It was completed in mid-July 1931, at a total cost of $191,000 (equivalent to $3,200,000 in 2024). Paving was done by the Globe Construction Company of Wichita, and the Tomlinson Bridge and Supply Company of Garfield was tasked with its construction. In September 1930, Edward Tomlinson was arrested and forced to pay a $50 fine (equivalent to $1,000 in 2025) after he worked his employees more than eight hours a day in an attempt to finish the bridge ahead of schedule.

On July 22, 1931, an opening ceremony and dance took place with approximately 5,000 people present. The South Side Booster Band performed, followed by the Bob and Laura Collins Orchestra.

By 1991, the John Mack Bridge was in poor condition and was at risk of being demolished. Local support led to its preservation and a 1997 renovation. Additionally, a bridge was built along its east side to allow four-lane traffic low. In 1992, the John Mack Bridge was placed on the National Register of Historic Places.

== See also ==
- National Register of Historic Places listings in Sedgwick County, Kansas
