= Stidham, Oklahoma =

- Town
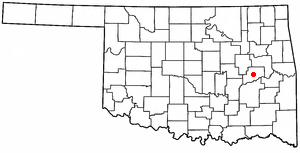
- Location in Oklahoma
- Coordinates: 35°22′07″N 95°42′03″W
- Country: United States
- State: Oklahoma
- County: McIntosh
- Named for: George Washington Stidham

Area
  - Total: 0.031 sq mi (0.08 km^{2})
  - Land: 0.031 sq mi (0.08 km^{2})
  - Water: 0 sq mi (0.00 km^{2})
- Elevation: 633 ft (193 m)

Population (2020)
  - Total: 17
  - Density: 537.2/sq mi (207.43/km^{2})
- Time zone: UTC-6 (Central (CST))
  - Summer (DST): UTC-5 (CDT)
- ZIP Codes: 74432 (Eufaula); 74461 (Stidham)
- Area codes: 539/918
- FIPS code: 40-70200
- GNIS feature ID: 2413336

Stidham is a town in McIntosh County, Oklahoma, United States. The population was 17 at the 2020 census.

== Geography ==
Stidham is in central McIntosh County, 12 miles (19 km) by road northwest of Eufaula, the county seat. According to the U.S. Census Bureau, the town has a total area of 0.03 square miles (0.08 km^{2}), all land. Eufaula Lake, a reservoir on the Canadian River, is 3 miles (5 km) to the north, east, and southeast.

== Demographics ==
Historical population
Census	Pop.	Note	%±
1910	116		—
1920	62		−46.6%
1930	93		50.0%
1940	103		10.8%
1950	46		−55.3%
1960	88		91.3%
1970	53		−39.8%
1980	60		13.2%
1990	48		−20.0%
2000	23		−52.1%
2010	18		−21.7%
2020	17		−5.6%
U.S. Decennial Census

=== 2020 census ===
As of the 2020 census, Stidham had a population of 17. The median age was 30.5 years. 35.3% of residents were under the age of 18 and 17.6% of residents were 65 years of age or older. For every 100 females there were 112.5 males, and for every 100 females age 18 and over there were 83.3 males age 18 and over.

0.0% of residents lived in urban areas, while 100.0% lived in rural areas.

There were 7 households in Stidham, of which 28.6% had children under the age of 18 living in them. Of all households, 57.1% were married-couple households, 14.3% were households with a male householder and no spouse or partner present, and 28.6% were households with a female householder and no spouse or partner present. About 28.6% of all households were made up of individuals and 0.0% had someone living alone who was 65 years of age or older.

There were 7 housing units, of which 0.0% were vacant. The homeowner vacancy rate was 0.0% and the rental vacancy rate was 0.0%.

Racial composition as of the 2020 census
Race	Number	Percent
White	11	64.7%
Black or African American	0	0.0%
American Indian and Alaska Native	4	23.5%
Asian	0	0.0%
Native Hawaiian and Other Pacific Islander	0	0.0%
Some other race	1	5.9%
Two or more races	1	5.9%
Hispanic or Latino (of any race)	0	0.0%

=== 2000 census ===
As of the census of 2000, there were 23 people, 10 households, and 5 families residing in the town. The population density was 688.1 inhabitants per square mile (265.7/km^{2}). There were 14 housing units at an average density of 418.9 per square mile (161.7/km^{2}). The racial makeup of the town was 52.17% White, and 47.83% Native American.

There were 10 households, out of which 30.0% had children under the age of 18 living with them, 40.0% were married couples living together, 10.0% had a female householder with no husband present, and 50.0% were non-families. 40.0% of all households were made up of individuals, and 20.0% had someone living alone who was 65 years of age or older. The average household size was 2.30 and the average family size was 3.40.

In the town, the population was spread out, with 26.1% under the age of 18, 13.0% from 18 to 24, 26.1% from 25 to 44, 26.1% from 45 to 64, and 8.7% who were 65 years of age or older. The median age was 42 years. For every 100 females, there were 64.3 males. For every 100 females age 18 and over, there were 70.0 males.

The median income for a household in the town was $22,708, and the median income for a family was $23,333. Males had a median income of $23,750 versus $13,750 for females. The per capita income for the town was $3,764. There are 25.0% of families living below the poverty line and 10.7% of the population, including none under 18 and 100.0% of those over 64.
