= U.S. Route 266 =

Highway in the United States

U.S. Highway 266
- US 266 highlighted in red

Route information
- Auxiliary route of US 66
- Maintained by ODOT
- Length: 43.09 mi (69.35 km)
- Existed: 1926–present

Major junctions
- West end: US 75 / US 62 in Henryetta
- US 69 in Checotah; I-40 south of Warner
- East end: US 64 / SH-2 in Warner

Location
- Country: United States
- State: Oklahoma
- Counties: Okmulgee, McIntosh, Muskogee

Highway system
- United States Numbered Highway System; List; Special; Divided; Oklahoma State Highway System; Interstate; US; State; Turnpikes
← US 259	→ SH-266

U.S. Route 266 (US 266) is a 43.09-mile (69.35 km), east–west U.S. Numbered Highway in Okmulgee, McIntosh, and Muskogee counties in Oklahoma, United States, that connects U.S. Route 62 and U.S. Route 75 (US 62/US 75) in Henryetta with U.S. Route 64 (US 64) in Warner. The highway no longer meets the former route of its parent, U.S. Route 66 (US 66), and is closely paralleled by Interstate 40 (I-40), which replaced US 266 (along with accompanying routes US 62 from Oklahoma City to Henryetta and US 64 from Warner to the Arkansas border west of Fort Smith, Arkansas) as the major east–west highway east of Oklahoma City during the 1960s.

== Route description ==
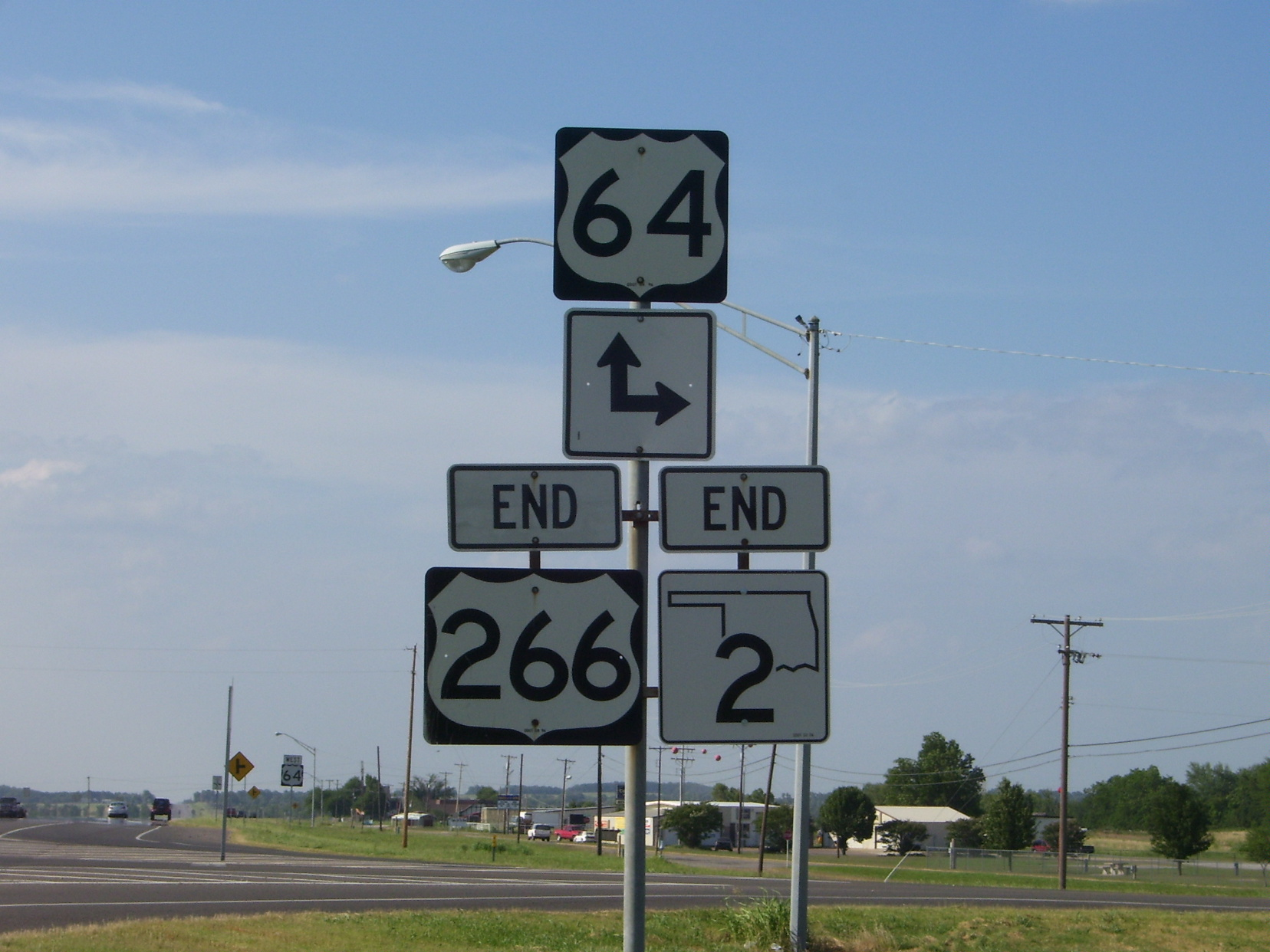
The eastern end of US 266 and SH-2 near Warner, May 2006

US 266 begins at US 62/US 75 on the northeast side of Henryetta, approximately 2 miles (3.2 km) north of I-40. The highway heads east from this point, quickly crossing into the town of Dewar, which it bisects. As it leaves Dewar, US 266 turns northeast, crossing Coal Creek and the Deep Fork River. The highway bypasses Hoffman to the east, providing access via Hoffman Road. The route then passes through the southeastern outskirts of Grayson. The highway then turns due east. Immediately after the curve, the highway serves as the southern terminus of Oklahoma State Highway 52's northern section. US 266 then continues east into McIntosh County.

US 266 continues due east, running parallel to the Deep Fork Arm of Eufaula Lake, the reservoir's northernmost arm. South of Council Hill, the highway intersects Oklahoma State Highway 72 (SH-72) at its southern terminus. US 266 turns south-southeast, continuing the alignment of SH-72. The route then turns back to the east and heads into the city of Checotah. On the west side of town, US 266 has an interchange with the modern freeway route of U.S. Route 69 (US 69). Further east, in downtown Checotah, the route intersects the old alignment of US 69 (US 69 Business). The highway heads due east out of Checotah, descending a ridge and passing just south of its summit, Mt. Nebo. The highway passes under I-40 just before crossing into Muskogee County.

Just under 3 miles (4.8 km) east of the McIntosh–Muskogee county line, US 266 intersects the southern Oklahoma State Highway 2 (SH-2). US 266 begins a concurrency with the state route (SH-2), traveling northwest to an interchange with I-40, numbered as Exit 278. The highways then curve around to due north to pass through Warner. On the north edge of Warner lies an intersection with US 64, where both US 266 and SH-2 end. Continuing straight puts the traveler on westbound US 64 toward Tulsa, while turning right brings the motorist onto eastbound US 64 toward Fort Smith, Arkansas.

== History ==
Prior to the inception of the U.S. highway system, Oklahoma State Highway 9 (SH-9) covered much of the corridor from Oklahoma City to Spiro. Upon the US route system's inception, US 266 replaced SH-9 from its junction with US 66 at 23rd Street and Lincoln Boulevard in Oklahoma City to US 64 in Warner. By 1930, along with changes to several other branches of US 66, the route was truncated at Henryetta. The segment from Oklahoma City to Henryetta became part of US 62, which was commissioned in 1930.

== Junction list ==
County	Location	mi	km	Destinations	Notes
Okmulgee	Henryetta	0.00	0.00	Frisco Avenue west	Continuation west beyond western terminus
Okmulgee	Henryetta	0.00	0.00	US 75 / US 62 to I-40 – Okmulgee	Western terminus
Okmulgee	Grayson	7.3	11.7	SH-52 north – Morris	Southern end of SH-52
McIntosh		19.9	32.0	SH-72 north	Southern end of SH-72
McIntosh	Checotah	26.5	42.6	US 69 – Muskogee, McAlester	Cloverleaf interchange
McIntosh	Checotah	27.35	44.02	US 69 Bus. (Broadway Street)	
Muskogee		40.40	65.02	SH-2 south – Porum	Western end of SH-2 concurrency
Muskogee		41.5	66.8	I-40 – Ft. Smith, Oklahoma City	Diamond interchange; I-40 exit 278
Muskogee	Warner	43.09	69.35	SH-2 ends / US 64	Eastern terminus; Eastern end of SH-2 concurrency; road continues as US 64 west
1.000 mi = 1.609 km; 1.000 km = 0.621 mi: Concurrency terminus

== See also ==
- List of U.S. Highways in Oklahoma
- List of United States Numbered Highways
