= Haskell, Oklahoma =

Haskell, Oklahoma Svwokle (Creek)
- City
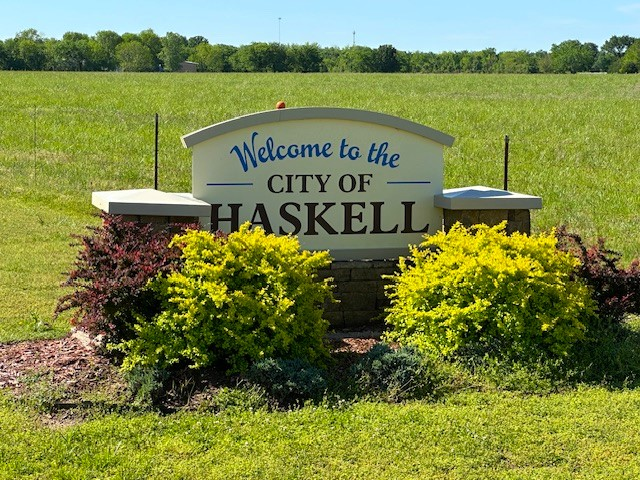
- Haskell welcome sign, May 2025

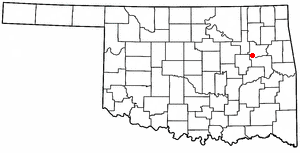
- Location in Oklahoma
- Coordinates: 35°49′08″N 95°40′50″W
- Country: United States
- State: Oklahoma
- County: Muskogee

Area
  - Total: 5.07 sq mi (13.13 km^{2})
  - Land: 5.03 sq mi (13.03 km^{2})
  - Water: 0.042 sq mi (0.11 km^{2})
- Elevation: 587 ft (179 m)

Population (2020)
  - Total: 1,626
  - Density: 323.2/sq mi (124.79/km^{2})
- Time zone: UTC-6 (Central (CST))
  - Summer (DST): UTC-5 (CDT)
- ZIP Code: 74436
- Area codes: 539/918
- FIPS code: 40-32900
- GNIS feature ID: 2412732
- Website: www.haskellok.org

Haskell (Creek: Svwokle) is a city in Muskogee County, Oklahoma, United States. The population was 1,626 at the 2020 census, down from 2,007 in 2010. Haskell was established in 1904 on the Midland Valley Railroad. It was named for townsite developer Charles N. Haskell, who became the first governor of the state of Oklahoma in 1907.

== History ==
Haskell was founded about one and a half miles northeast of the Muscogee (Creek) Nation town of Sawokla, which already had a post office, a store and a cotton gin. Sawokla was a Hitchiti town and had been the home of Creek Chief Samuel Checote. The original 80 acres (32 ha) tract was allotted to Amos Rolland, a member of the Creek Nation. The store and gin relocated from Sawokla to Haskell as soon as the railroad was completed in 1904. The first store, S. Beshara and Brothers, was started in a tent by two immigrants from Syria. Haskell's first post office was established in 1902, with Nat Lambertson, owner of a new hardware and general store, appointed as first postmaster. Other early businesses were C. E. Henson's general store and A. J. Englert's mill and elevator. The Haskell National Bank was organized in 1904, soon followed by the First National Bank, the International Bank, and the Arkansas Valley Bank. In the early 1990s, the town appointed Charlie B. White, a native son, its first black mayor. He died on March 17, 2013.

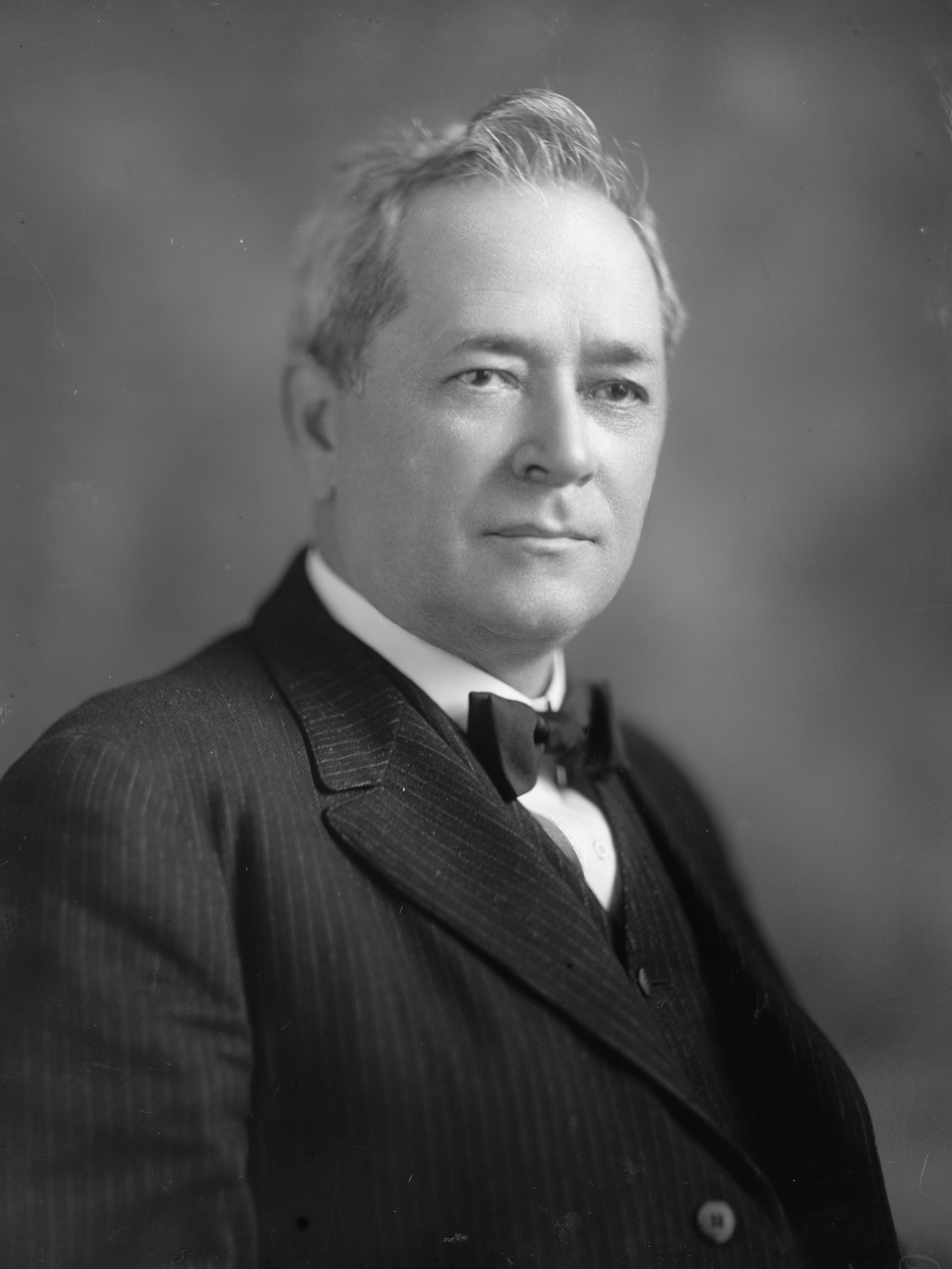
The town was named after the first governor of Oklahoma, Charles N. Haskell.

The railroad enabled farmers near Haskell to ship their produce (grain, hay, corn, melons and cotton) to northern and eastern markets. Haskell counted 720 residents at the time of statehood in 1907. The Robertson Memorial Presbyterian Church, named for a missionary family who had lived in the area, was built in 1909. The president of Henry Kendall College came from Muskogee to preside over the dedication. The building is still in use in the 21st century.

Gas and oil were discovered near Haskell in 1910. This sparked a period of prosperity, and Haskell soon could boast of improvements such as paved streets, concrete sidewalks, electric lights, natural gas lines, and water works.

The Tulsa-Muskogee Turnpike, completed in 1969, bypassed Haskell and diverted much road traffic from U.S. Highway 64. This caused a significant loss of revenue for many businesses in town.

In March 2024, by a vote of the citizens, Haskell changed from a town to a city manager form of government.

== Geography ==
Haskell is located 19 miles (31 km) northwest of Muskogee, in the northwestern corner of Muskogee County. U.S. Route 64 passes through the city, leading southeast to Muskogee, the county seat, and northwest 38 miles (61 km) to Tulsa via Bixby. State Highway 72 passes through Haskell with US 64 but leads north 9 miles (14 km) to Coweta.

According to the U.S. Census Bureau, Haskell has a total area of 5.07 square miles (13.13 km^{2}), of which 5.03 square miles (13.03 km^{2}) are land and 0.04 square miles (0.10 km^{2}), or 0.81%, are water. The city lies 2 miles (3 km) west of the Arkansas River.

== Demographics ==
Historical population
Census	Pop.	Note	%±
1910	857		—
1920	2,196		156.2%
1930	1,682		−23.4%
1940	1,572		−6.5%
1950	1,676		6.6%
1960	1,887		12.6%
1970	2,063		9.3%
1980	1,953		−5.3%
1990	2,143		9.7%
2000	1,765		−17.6%
2010	2,007		13.7%
2020	1,626		−19.0%
U.S. Decennial Census

As of the census of 2000, there were 1,765 people, 679 households, and 482 families residing in the town. The population density was 812.1 inhabitants per square mile (313.6/km^{2}). There were 763 housing units at an average density of 351.1 per square mile (135.6/km^{2}). The racial makeup of the town was 72.75% White, 8.90% African American, 10.88% Native American, 0.06% Asian, 0.06% from other races, and 7.37% from two or more races. Hispanic or Latino of any race were 0.68% of the population.

There were 679 households, out of which 32.0% had children under the age of 18 living with them, 52.7% were married couples living together, 13.7% had a female householder with no husband present, and 28.9% were non-families. 26.1% of all households were made up of individuals, and 15.0% had someone living alone who was 65 years of age or older. The average household size was 2.54 and the average family size was 3.06.

In the town, the population was spread out, with 27.2% under the age of 18, 7.9% from 18 to 24, 25.2% from 25 to 44, 20.7% from 45 to 64, and 19.0% who were 65 years of age or older. The median age was 38 years. For every 100 females, there were 84.0 males. For every 100 females age 18 and over, there were 81.2 males.

The median income for a household in the town was $25,542, and the median income for a family was $29,196. Males had a median income of $26,413 versus $19,926 for females. The per capita income for the town was $12,805. About 17.8% of families and 21.8% of the population were below the poverty line, including 28.4% of those under age 18 and 19.2% of those age 65 or over.

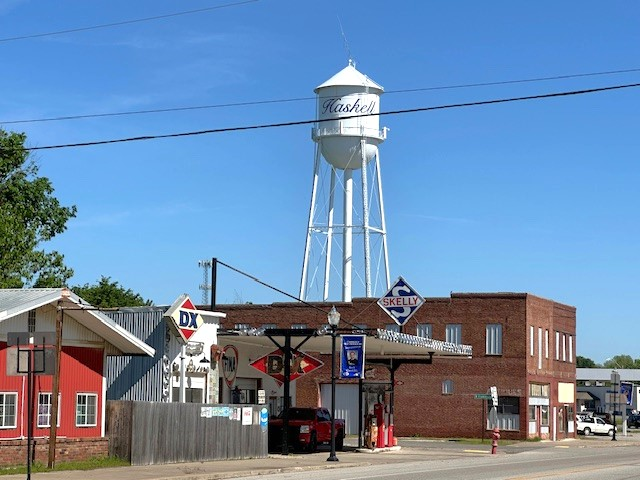
Haskell Water Tower & Downtown scene, May 2025

== Government ==
As of March 2024, by a vote of the citizens, Haskell changed from a Town Trustee form of government to a Council/City Manager form of government, which consists of four wards, four trustees with a fifth trustee elected at large for a total of five trustees. Candidates must live in a specific ward. The trustees are then elected at large. The mayor is elected from the board of trustees. The board establishes ordinances (laws) and resolutions (policy) and rates for services.

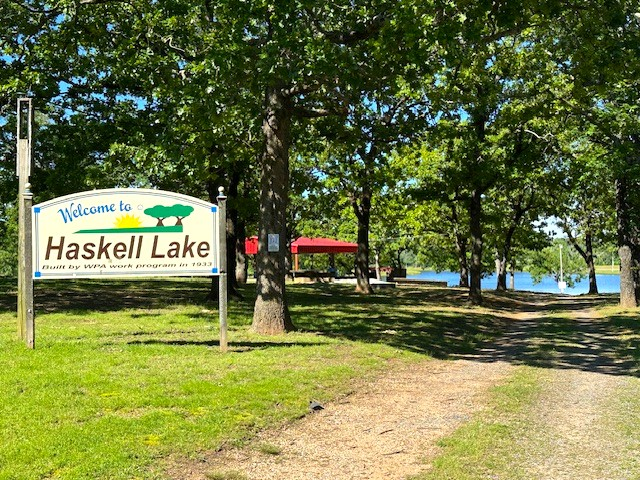
Haskell Lake in May, 2025

== Transportation ==
Haskell is served by US Route 64, Oklahoma State Highway 72, and Oklahoma State Highway 104. US Route 62 and Oklahoma State Highway 16 have a junction just south of town.

The privately owned Haskell Airport (FAA ID: 2K9), about 1 mile northeast of Haskell, features a 3710' x 30' paved runway.

Commercial air transportation is available at Tulsa International Airport, about 35 miles north-northwest.

== Recreation ==
Haskell Lake is located about 3 miles (5 km) northwest of central Haskell. Created by the WPA, it is about 14 acres (5.7 ha) in size and known for good fishing.

The Arkansas River, just to the east of town, also offers fishing opportunities for species like catfish, though access there is typically had through private lands.

The town has Haskell City Park, where it has held its Frontier Day celebration.
