= Pittsburg County, Oklahoma =

County in Oklahoma, United States

- County
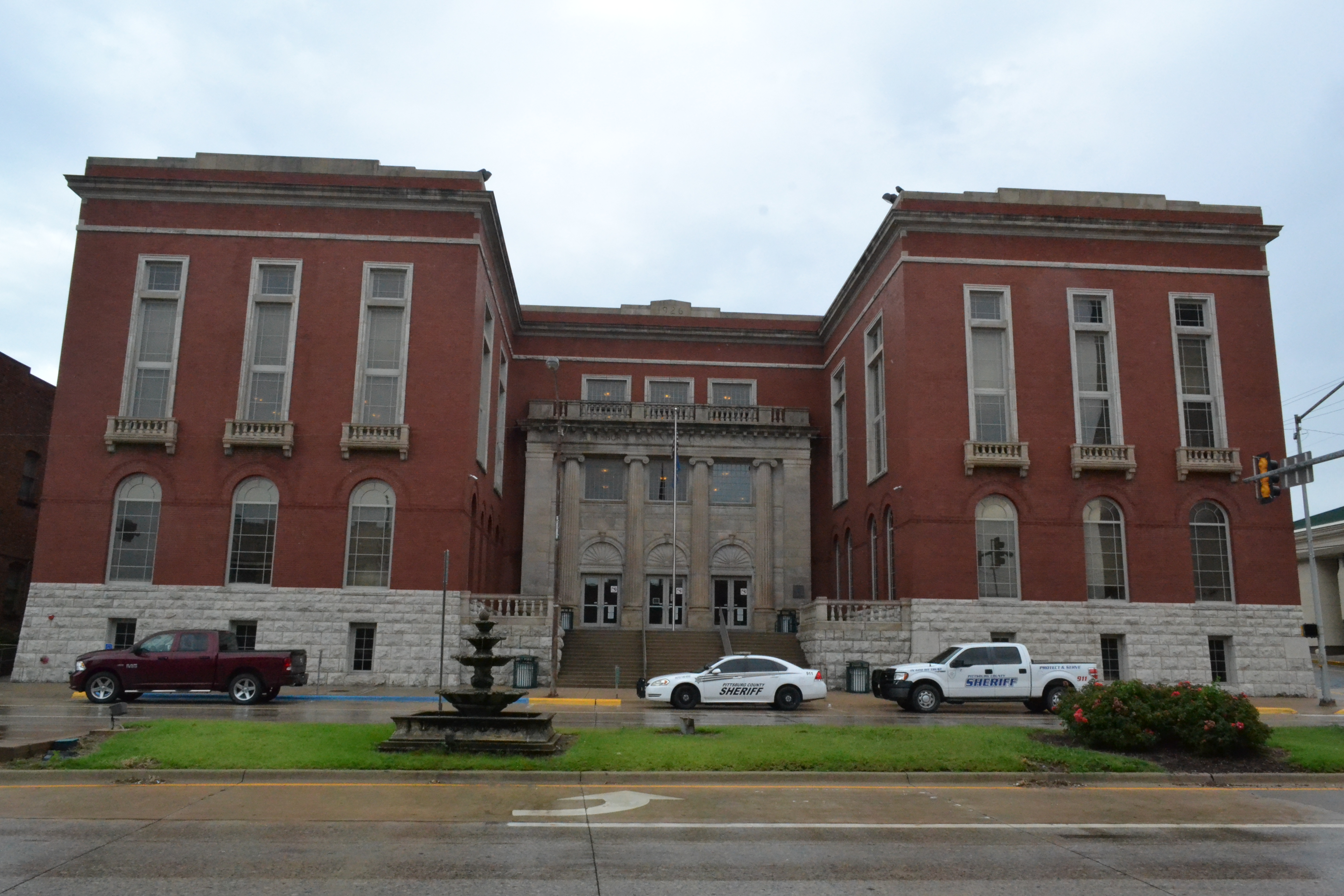
- Pittsburg County Courthouse

- Location within the U.S. state of Oklahoma
- Coordinates: 34°56′N 95°45′W
- Country: United States
- State: Oklahoma
- Founded: 1907
- Named for: Pittsburgh, Pennsylvania
- Seat: McAlester
- Largest city: McAlester

Area
  - Total: 1,378 sq mi (3,570 km^{2})
  - Land: 1,305 sq mi (3,380 km^{2})
  - Water: 72 sq mi (190 km^{2}) 5.3%

Population (2020)
  - Total: 43,773
  - Estimate (2025): 43,320 ▼
  - Density: 33.54/sq mi (12.95/km^{2})
- Congressional district: 2nd
- Website: pittsburg.okcounties.org

Pittsburg County is a county located in the U.S. state of Oklahoma. As of the 2020 census, the population was 43,773. Its county seat is McAlester. The county was formed from part of the Choctaw Nation in Indian Territory in 1907. County leaders believed that its coal production compared favorably with Pittsburgh, Pennsylvania at the time of statehood.

Pittsburg County comprises the McAlester, OK micropolitan statistical area.

== History ==
The area forming Pittsburg County was part of the Choctaw Nation after the Choctaw tribe was forced to relocate to Indian Territory from its home in the Southeastern United States in the early 1830s. Unlike the State of Oklahoma, whose county boundaries follow the precise north–south, east–west grid provided by Oklahoma's township and range system, the Choctaw Nation established its internal divisions using easily recognizable landmarks, such as mountains and rivers, as borders. The territory of present-day Pittsburg County fell within two of the three provinces, called districts, comprising the Choctaw Nation, the Moshulatubbee District and Pushmataha District, and within those districts, into Atoka County, Jack's Fork County, Gaines County, Sans Bois County, and Tobucksy County.

Some important trails, including the Texas Road and one route of the California Trail passed through what is now Pittsburg County. In 1840, James Perry established a village called Perryville that became an important stop near the place where the two trails crossed. During the Civil War, Perryville served as an important supply depot for Confederate forces until the Union Army captured and burned the town. It became defunct after the Missouri, Kansas and Texas Railway (MK&T) bypassed it in 1872, and the remaining inhabitants moved to McAlester. The Butterfield Overland Mail route followed a route through this area.

James J. McAlester moved to the Choctaw Nation in 1872, opened a trading post and married a Chickasaw woman. This qualified him to obtain citizenship rights in the Choctaw and Chickasaw Nations. When the MK&T built its line, McAlester laid claim to the coal deposits in the Perryville area, which he and some partners leased to the Osage Coal and Mining Company, which was owned by the Missouri Pacific Railroad and acquired by the MK&T in 1888.

Pittsburg County was formed on July 16, 1907, as an original county from Choctaw land. County leaders, thinking its coal production compared favorably with Pittsburgh, Pennsylvania, named the new county after the Pennsylvania city with the "h" removed. Coal mining continued to expand until the early 20th century. Production began to decline after 1920, and never fully recovered. By 1966, the county production was no longer reported.

== Geography ==
According to the U.S. Census Bureau, the county has a total area of 1,378 square miles (3,570 km^{2}), of which 1,305 square miles (3,380 km^{2}) is land and 72 square miles (190 km^{2}) (5.3%) is water. The county's topography is generally hilly to mountainous. The Ouachita Mountains extend into the southeastern portion. The Canadian River drains most of the county and with Eufaula Lake form the northern boundary of the county. The southern part of the county is drained by several creeks that flow into the Kiamichi River and then into the Red River.

=== Adjacent counties ===
- McIntosh County (north)
- Haskell County (northeast)
- Latimer County (east)
- Pushmataha County (southeast)
- Atoka County (south)
- Coal County (southwest)
- Hughes County (west)

== Demographics ==
Historical population
Census	Pop.	Note	%±
1910	47,650		—
1920	52,570		10.3%
1930	50,778		−3.4%
1940	48,985		−3.5%
1950	41,031		−16.2%
1960	34,360		−16.3%
1970	37,521		9.2%
1980	40,524		8.0%
1990	40,581		0.1%
2000	43,953		8.3%
2010	45,837		4.3%
2020	43,773		−4.5%
2025 (est.)	43,320	▼	−1.0%
U.S. Decennial Census; 1790-1960 1900-1990; 1990-2000 2010

=== 2020 census ===
As of the 2020 census, the county had a population of 43,773. Of the residents, 22.1% were under the age of 18 and 20.4% were 65 years of age or older; the median age was 41.8 years. For every 100 females there were 103.6 males, and for every 100 females age 18 and over there were 102.9 males.

The racial makeup of the county was 66.3% White, 2.9% Black or African American, 15.1% American Indian and Alaska Native, 0.6% Asian, 2.0% from some other race, and 13.0% from two or more races. Hispanic or Latino residents of any race comprised 5.2% of the population.

There were 17,339 households in the county, of which 29.0% had children under the age of 18 living with them and 27.3% had a female householder with no spouse or partner present. About 29.8% of all households were made up of individuals and 14.1% had someone living alone who was 65 years of age or older.

There were 22,046 housing units, of which 21.4% were vacant. Among occupied housing units, 72.3% were owner-occupied and 27.7% were renter-occupied. The homeowner vacancy rate was 2.3% and the rental vacancy rate was 12.3%.

=== 2010 census ===
As of the census of 2010, there were 45,837 people, 18,623 households, and 15,389 families residing in the county. The population density was 13/km^{2} (34/mi^{2}). There were 22,634 housing units at an average density of 6/km^{2} (16/mi^{2}). The racial makeup of the county was 73.6% White/Caucasian, 3.3% Black or African American, 13.8% Native American, 0.40% Asian, 0.03% Pacific Islander, 0.78% from other races, and 7.6% from two or more races; 3.14% of the population were Hispanic or Latino of any race. 17.4% were of American, 12.7% Irish, 11.3% German, 9.4% English and 7.2% Italian ancestry.

In 2010, there were 18,623 households, out of which 29.00% had children under the age of 18 living with them, 54.90% were married couples living together, 11.20% had a female householder with no husband present, and 30.40% were non-families. 27.70% of all households were made up of individuals, and 13.30% had someone living alone who was 65 years of age or older. The average household size was 2.40 and the average family size was 2.90. In the county, the population was spread out, with 23.50% under the age of 18, 7.80% from 18 to 24, 26.90% from 25 to 44, 24.60% from 45 to 64, and 17.10% who were 65 years of age or older. The median age was 39 years. For every 100 females there were 101.50 males. For every 100 females age 18 and over, there were 100.10 males.

As of 2010, the median income for a household in the county was $28,679, and the median income for a family was $35,190. Males had a median income of $28,470 versus $19,886 for females. The per capita income for the county was $15,494. About 13.60% of families and 17.20% of the population were below the poverty line, including 22.70% of those under age 18 and 13.30% of those age 65 or over.

== Politics ==
Voter Registration and Party Enrollment as of June 30, 2023
Party	Number of Voters	Percentage
Democratic	8,505	32.28%
Republican	13,446	51.04%
Others	4,395	16.68%
Total	26,346	100%

United States presidential election results for Pittsburg County, Oklahoma
Year	Republican		Democratic		Third party(ies)	
Year	No.	%	No.	%	No.	%
1908	2,735	43.65%	2,891	46.14%	640	10.21%
1912	1,574	27.07%	2,767	47.59%	1,473	25.34%
1916	1,879	30.26%	3,441	55.42%	889	14.32%
1920	5,371	47.17%	5,361	47.08%	655	5.75%
1924	3,554	33.01%	6,062	56.31%	1,149	10.67%
1928	5,875	49.20%	5,960	49.91%	107	0.90%
1932	2,396	18.53%	10,536	81.47%	0	0.00%
1936	3,651	26.71%	9,974	72.97%	43	0.31%
1940	4,484	30.55%	10,169	69.29%	23	0.16%
1944	4,068	32.22%	8,535	67.60%	23	0.18%
1948	2,893	23.20%	9,576	76.80%	0	0.00%
1952	5,909	38.23%	9,546	61.77%	0	0.00%
1956	5,239	38.46%	8,382	61.54%	0	0.00%
1960	5,834	44.39%	7,310	55.61%	0	0.00%
1964	3,555	26.42%	9,903	73.58%	0	0.00%
1968	3,978	28.79%	6,112	44.24%	3,726	26.97%
1972	9,989	66.42%	4,748	31.57%	303	2.01%
1976	4,807	30.63%	10,743	68.46%	142	0.90%
1980	7,062	44.54%	8,292	52.29%	503	3.17%
1984	9,778	58.34%	6,860	40.93%	122	0.73%
1988	7,594	46.47%	8,623	52.77%	125	0.76%
1992	5,659	30.06%	8,523	45.27%	4,645	24.67%
1996	5,966	35.58%	8,475	50.55%	2,325	13.87%
2000	8,514	52.05%	7,627	46.63%	216	1.32%
2004	11,134	59.91%	7,452	40.09%	0	0.00%
2008	11,752	68.29%	5,457	31.71%	0	0.00%
2012	10,841	69.17%	4,831	30.83%	0	0.00%
2016	12,753	73.84%	3,711	21.49%	807	4.67%
2020	13,851	77.28%	3,768	21.02%	305	1.70%
2024	13,841	78.77%	3,473	19.76%	258	1.47%

== Economy ==
Although Pittsburg County was originally noted for its coal production, agriculture has long been important to the county economy. Just after statehood, farmers controlled 20 percent of the county's land area. The most important cash crops were corn and cotton. By 1960, sorghum had become the most important crop. In 2000, wheat had become the top crop.

Manufacturing became significant when the U.S. Navy built an ammunition depot at McAlester during World War II. It employed 8,000 people in 1945. The U. S. Army took over the facility in 1977.

The Corps of Engineers built Eufaula Lake between 1956 and 1964, which brought tourism, land development and a major source of hydroelectric power.

== Communities ==
=== Cities ===
- Haileyville
- Hartshorne
- Krebs
- McAlester (county seat)

=== Towns ===
- Alderson
- Ashland
- Canadian
- Carlton Landing
- Crowder
- Indianola
- Kiowa
- Pittsburg
- Quinton
- Savanna

=== Census-designated places ===
- Adamson
- Arpelar
- Bache
- Blanco
- Bug Tussle
- Canadian Shores
- Haywood
- Longtown
- Scipio

=== Other unincorporated places ===
- Blocker
- Cabaniss – located near the intersection of "Cabiness" Road, US Highway 270 and Twisted Creek Road.
- Ti

== Education ==
School districts include:

K-12:

- Canadian Public Schools
- Clayton Public Schools
- Crowder Public Schools
- Haileyville Public Schools
- Hartshorne Public Schools
- Indianola Public Schools
- Kiowa Public Schools
- McAlester Public Schools
- Pittsburg Public Schools
- Quinton Public Schools
- Savanna Public Schools
- Stuart Public Schools

Elementary only:

- Frink-Chambers Public School
- Haywood Public School
- Krebs Public School
- Tannehill Public School

There is a Bureau of Indian Education (BIE)-affiliated school and boarding facility, Jones Academy (education for grades 1–6, boarding only for grades 7–12)

== NRHP sites ==
The following sites in Pittsburg County are listed on the National Register of Historic Places:

- Aldridge Hotel, McAlester
- Blackburn's Station Site, Pittsburg
- Busby Office Building, McAlester
- Busby Theatre, McAlester
- Canadian Jail and Livery Stable, Canadian
- Choate Cabin, Indianola
- Cole Chapel School, Hartshorne
- Federal Building and US Courthouse, McAlester
- First Presbyterian Church, McAlester
- Hokey's Drugstore, Krebs
- Jeff Lee Park Bath House and Pool, McAlester
- Mass Grave of the Mexican Miners, McAlester
- McAlester Armory, McAlester
- McAlester DX, McAlester
- McAlester House, McAlester
- McAlester Scottish Rite Temple, McAlester
- Mine Rescue Station Building, McAlester
- New State School, McAlester
- OKLA Theater, McAlester
- Perryville, McAlester
- Pittsburg County Courthouse, McAlester
- Pittsburg School and Gymnasium, Pittsburg
- Southern Ice and Cold Storage Company, Pittsburg
- St. Joseph's Catholic Church, Krebs
- Tipton Ridge School, Blocker
