= Adamson, Oklahoma =

Ghost Town in Oklahoma, United States

Adamson is classified as a Census designated place per the GNIS.

Adamson is a ghost town in Pittsburg County, Oklahoma, United States. It was located between McAlester and Wilburton. The town contained 15 coal mines. Four mines were major producers. A post office was established at Adamson, Indian Territory on March 1, 1906. The town was named for Peter Adamson, a mine owner. It was a prosperous coal mining town before and during World War I, especially during 1913 to 1919. On September 4, 1914, Adamson was the site of one of the worst coal mine disasters in the United States. The town never recovered economically, and is now considered a ghost town. It has since been largely engulfed by Eufaula Lake.

== History ==
At the time of its founding, Adamson was located in Gaines County, a part of the Moshulatubbee District of the Choctaw Nation.

Adamson began as a coal-mining camp about the turn of the 20th century. Its population peaked at about 3,500 during World War I, when it had 15 operating mines. The Rock Island and Katy railroads both built spurs to ship the coal. The Rock Island line was abandoned in 1902, while the Katy remained in service until 1950.

One of the worst mining disasters in Oklahoma occurred at Mine No. 1 on September 4, 1914. It began to collapse. One of the miners reported a cracking sound about 3:30 p.m., and the mine workers were immediately ordered to evacuate. Nearly all of the miners quickly ascended to the surface, but fourteen were trapped at the lowest level. They were buried when the entire mine collapsed. Neither rescue nor recovery of bodies was possible. The surface of the ground sank dropped between 8 feet (2.4 m) and 10 feet (3.0 m).

The last man to come out of the mine before it completely collapsed was Anthony Benedict. He created a monument to honor the deceased miners on his farm off of the Hartshorne-Adamson Road.

A 1957 publication reported that Adamson then had about ten houses and two small grocery stores, which catered mostly to people visiting nearby Eufaula Lake. As of 2014, Anna Benedict reported that there were many families thriving in Adamson. The post office and grocery was no longer there, but a church was flourishing. A few of the original families that used to work in the mines still reside in Adamson with their families. The mines had all been closed and had filled with water.

== Geography ==
Adamson is located at 34°55′26″N 95°32′49″W. It is 10 miles (16 km) east of McAlester and 6 miles (9.7 km) north of Hartshorne. The elevation of Adamson is 620 feet (190 m).

== Demographics ==
=== 2020 census ===
As of the 2020 census, Adamson had a population of 69. The median age was 39.6 years. 20.3% of residents were under the age of 18 and 14.5% of residents were 65 years of age or older. For every 100 females there were 91.7 males, and for every 100 females age 18 and over there were 77.4 males age 18 and over.

0% of residents lived in urban areas, while 100.0% lived in rural areas.

There were 29 households in Adamson, of which 13.8% had children under the age of 18 living in them. Of all households, 20.7% were married-couple households, 48.3% were households with a male householder and no spouse or partner present, and 31.0% were households with a female householder and no spouse or partner present. About 55.2% of all households were made up of individuals and 37.9% had someone living alone who was 65 years of age or older.

There were 36 housing units, of which 19.4% were vacant. The homeowner vacancy rate was 0% and the rental vacancy rate was 37.5%.

Racial composition as of the 2020 census
Race	Number	Percent
White	47	68.1%
Black or African American	1	1.4%
American Indian and Alaska Native	7	10.1%
Asian	1	1.4%
Native Hawaiian and Other Pacific Islander	0	0%
Some other race	0	0%
Two or more races	13	18.8%
Hispanic or Latino (of any race)	3	4.3%

== Education ==
It is zoned to Hartshorne Public Schools.
