= Jeremy Case =

American college basketball coach

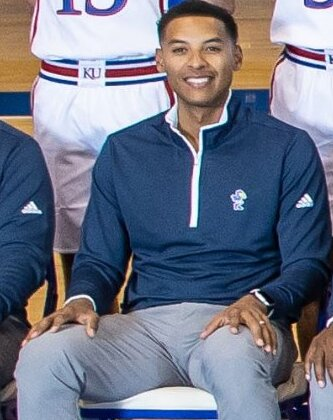
- Case in 2022

Current position
- Title: Associate head coach
- Team: Kansas
- Conference: Big 12

Biographical details
- Born: November 10, 1984 (age 41)

Playing career
- 2003–2008: Kansas

Coaching career (HC unless noted)
- 2008–2009: Kansas (graduate assistant)
- 2009–2012: Southeast Missouri State (assistant)
- 2012–2016: Houston Baptist University (assistant)
- 2021–2025: Kansas (assistant)
- 2025–present: Kansas (associate HC)

Administrative career (AD unless noted)
- 2016–2021: Kansas (video coordinator)

Accomplishments and honors

Championships
- As player: NCAA champion (2008); As coach: NCAA champion (2022)

Jeremy Case (born November 10, 1984) is an American college basketball coach who is the associate head coach at the University of Kansas. He won a National Championship as a player at Kansas in 2008 and won another championship as an assistant coach in 2022.

== High school career ==
Case played for the McAlester High School in McAlester, Oklahoma. When he graduated, Case was the school's all-time leading scorer in basketball with 2,249 points, winning a regional championship and making the state 5A tournament twice, and playing at the varsity level all four years. The McAlester News-Capital also named Case as the 2002 all-area basketball player of the year. Case was named to the school's McAlester Athletics Hall of Fame in 2017.

Case received offers from many universities including Oklahoma, Ohio State, Notre Dame, Oklahoma State, and Colorado. On July 9, 2003, he announced his choice to play college basketball at the University of Kansas.

== College career ==
Case played in 94 games while at Kansas. During his time he won four Big 12 championships, 3 Elite Eights, and the 2008 National Championship. He was a two-time Academic All-Big 12 First Team honoree in 2006 and 2008.

== Coaching career ==
Case remained at Kansas as a graduate assistant from 2008 to 2009. Case left Kansas to work as an assistant coach at Southeast Missouri State from 2009 to 2012. From 2012 to 2016, he was an assistant coach at Houston Baptist University. Case returned to Kansas to serve as video coordinator in August 2016. He was promoted to assistant coach at Kansas on an interim basis in the summer of 2021 before being named full time assistant a few months later. On October 14, 2025, he was promoted to associate head coach, the first person to hold that position at Kansas under Bill Self.

== Personal ==
Case lives with his wife and son in Lawrence, Kansas. Case comes from a long line of athletic family including his mother, Rita Newton, who played at Seminole Junior College and his father, Win Case, was the head basketball coach at Oklahoma City University from 1993 until 2005 and is an assistant coach at Ole Miss. Win was a college teammate of Bill Self at Oklahoma State during the 1980s.
