= Scipio, Oklahoma =

- Unincorporated community
- Location within Oklahoma Location within the United States
- Coordinates: 35°03′05″N 95°57′20″W
- Country: United States
- State: Oklahoma
- County: Pittsburg

Area
  - Total: 0.69 sq mi (1.80 km^{2})
  - Land: 0.69 sq mi (1.80 km^{2})
  - Water: 0 sq mi (0.00 km^{2})
- Elevation: 712 ft (217 m)

Population (2020)
  - Total: 53
  - Density: 76.4/sq mi (29.51/km^{2})
- Time zone: UTC-6 (Central (CST))
  - Summer (DST): UTC-5 (CDT)
- Area codes: 918 & 539
- GNIS feature ID: 2805353

Scipio is an unincorporated community in Pittsburg County, Oklahoma, United States. As of the 2020 census, Scipio had a population of 53. The community is 12 miles (19 km) northwest of McAlester.

== Demographics ==
Historical population
Census	Pop.	Note	%±
2020	53		—
U.S. Decennial Census

=== 2020 census ===
As of the 2020 census, Scipio had a population of 53. The median age was 60.1 years. 15.1% of residents were under the age of 18 and 37.7% of residents were 65 years of age or older. For every 100 females there were 47.2 males, and for every 100 females age 18 and over there were 40.6 males age 18 and over.

0.0% of residents lived in urban areas, while 100.0% lived in rural areas.

There were 20 households in Scipio, of which 35.0% had children under the age of 18 living in them. Of all households, 45.0% were married-couple households, 10.0% were households with a male householder and no spouse or partner present, and 40.0% were households with a female householder and no spouse or partner present. About 30.0% of all households were made up of individuals and 10.0% had someone living alone who was 65 years of age or older.

There were 24 housing units, of which 16.7% were vacant. The homeowner vacancy rate was 4.8% and the rental vacancy rate was 100.0%.

Racial composition as of the 2020 census
Race	Number	Percent
White	33	62.3%
Black or African American	0	0.0%
American Indian and Alaska Native	7	13.2%
Asian	0	0.0%
Native Hawaiian and Other Pacific Islander	0	0.0%
Some other race	0	0.0%
Two or more races	13	24.5%
Hispanic or Latino (of any race)	2	3.8%

== History ==
The community was named for nearby Scipio Creek, which was in turn named for the Roman general Scipio Africanus. At the time of its founding, Scipio was located in Tobucksy County, Choctaw Nation. A post office opened at Scipio, Indian Territory on January 24, 1890.
