= Pittsburg, Oklahoma =

- Town
- Location within the state of Oklahoma
- Coordinates: 34°42′42″N 95°51′01″W
- Country: United States
- State: Oklahoma
- County: Pittsburg

Area
  - Total: 0.48 sq mi (1.24 km^{2})
  - Land: 0.48 sq mi (1.24 km^{2})
  - Water: 0 sq mi (0.00 km^{2})
- Elevation: 774 ft (236 m)

Population (2020)
  - Total: 180
  - Density: 380/sq mi (150/km^{2})
- Time zone: UTC-6 (Central (CST))
  - Summer (DST): UTC-5 (CDT)
- ZIP code: 74560
- Area codes: 539/918
- FIPS code: 40-59350
- GNIS feature ID: 2413139

Pittsburg is a town in Pittsburg County, Oklahoma, United States. As of the 2020 census, the community had 180 residents.

== History ==
The first settlement of present-day Pittsburg by non-indigenous peoples was in 1899 when Daniel Edwards, accompanied by son Thomas, placed a coal shaft two miles east of Kiowa, in Choctaw Nation. In 1903, the United States Postal Service established a post office in Cowpers and appointed Daniel Edwards as postmaster. Its name was changed to Edwards, Indian Territory, on September 3, 1903, and to Pittsburg, Oklahoma, on August 27, 1909. During its time as Edwards, it was named for J.R. Edwards, a coal operator. Its newest name, Pittsburg, commemorates the county which was created at Oklahoma's statehood in 1907.

At the time of its founding, the community was located in the Moshulatubbee District of the Choctaw Nation. The town was in the area of the boundary between Atoka and Tobucksy counties, and differing maps of the era placed it in each.

== Geography ==
According to the United States Census Bureau, the town has a total area of 0.5 square miles (1.3 km^{2}), all land.

== Demographics ==
Historical population
Census	Pop.	Note	%±
1920	892		—
1930	873		−2.1%
1940	689		−21.1%
1950	278		−59.7%
1960	195		−29.9%
1970	282		44.6%
1980	305		8.2%
1990	249		−18.4%
2000	280		12.4%
2010	207		−26.1%
2020	180		−13.0%
U.S. Decennial Census

=== 2020 census ===
As of the 2020 census, Pittsburg had a population of 180. The median age was 51.4 years. 15.0% of residents were under the age of 18 and 23.9% of residents were 65 years of age or older. For every 100 females there were 80.0 males, and for every 100 females age 18 and over there were 75.9 males age 18 and over.

0.0% of residents lived in urban areas, while 100.0% lived in rural areas.

There were 80 households in Pittsburg, of which 23.8% had children under the age of 18 living in them. Of all households, 40.0% were married-couple households, 16.3% were households with a male householder and no spouse or partner present, and 37.5% were households with a female householder and no spouse or partner present. About 28.8% of all households were made up of individuals and 6.3% had someone living alone who was 65 years of age or older.

There were 102 housing units, of which 21.6% were vacant. The homeowner vacancy rate was 6.4% and the rental vacancy rate was 23.1%.

Racial composition as of the 2020 census
Race	Number	Percent
White	123	68.3%
Black or African American	0	0.0%
American Indian and Alaska Native	26	14.4%
Asian	0	0.0%
Native Hawaiian and Other Pacific Islander	0	0.0%
Some other race	6	3.3%
Two or more races	25	13.9%
Hispanic or Latino (of any race)	9	5.0%

=== 2000 census ===
At the 2000 census, there were 280 people, 107 households and 84 families residing in the town. The population density was 582.1 per square mile (224.8/km^{2}). There were 121 housing units at an average density of 251.6 per square mile (97.1/km^{2}). The racial make-up was 67.50% White, 22.14% Native American, 0.36% from other races, and 10.00% from two or more races. Hispanic or Latino of any race were 2.14% of the population.

There were 107 households, of which 31.8% had children under the age of 18 living with them, 55.1% were married couples living together, 17.8% had a female householder with no husband present and 20.6% were non-families. 19.6% of all households were made up of individuals, and 12.1% had someone living alone who was 65 years of age or older. The average household size was 2.62 and the average family size was 2.96.

25.7% of the population were under the age of 18, 9.6% from 18 to 24, 26.4% from 25 to 44, 23.9% from 45 to 64 and 14.3% who were 65 years of age or older. The median age was 38 years. For every 100 females, there were 87.9 males. For every 100 females age 18 and over, there were 96.2 males.

The median household income was $19,479 and the median family incomewas $22,250. Males had a median income of $25,833 and females $17,500. The per capita income was $10,258. About 15.5% of families and 21.7% of the population were below the poverty line, including 30.8% of those under the age of eighteen and 12.2% of those 65 or over.
