= Bugtussle, Oklahoma =

Bugtussle
- Unincorporated community and Census-designated place
- Interactive map of Bugtussle
- Coordinates: 35°01′51″N 95°41′24″W
- Country: United States
- State: Oklahoma
- County: Pittsburg
- Elevation: 600 ft (180 m)
- Time zone: UTC-6 (CT)
  - Summer (DST): UTC-5 (CDT)
- Area codes: 539, 918
- GNIS feature ID: 2805308

Bugtussle or Bug Tussle is an unincorporated community on the southern shores of Lake Eufaula, in Pittsburg County, Oklahoma, United States, approximately 30 miles (48 km) west of Robbers Cave State Park.

== History ==
The community began in 1903 when Ran Woods and others constructed a two-room log schoolhouse on the site. The schoolhouse, no longer standing, was once attended by former Speaker of the United States House of Representatives, Carl Albert. The settlement was allegedly named by Woods, who felt that the bugs at the site were so numerous that they were an endless "tussle". Bugtussle is approximately 6 miles (9.7 km) northeast of McAlester. It was renamed Flowery Mound circa 1907, but the original name persisted. At the time of its founding, Bugtussle was in Tobucksy County, Choctaw Nation of Oklahoma, in the Indian Territory.

== Notable person ==
- Carl Albert, Speaker of the United States House of Representatives, 1971–1977, highest government post attained by any Oklahoman.
