= Alderson, Oklahoma =

Alderson
- Town
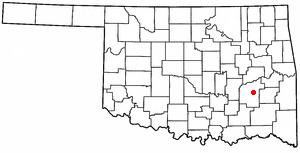
- Location of Alderson, Oklahoma

- Location within Oklahoma Location within the United States Location within North America
- Coordinates: 34°54′02″N 95°41′22″W
- Country: United States
- State: Oklahoma
- County: Pittsburg

Area
  - Total: 0.58 sq mi (1.51 km^{2})
  - Land: 0.58 sq mi (1.51 km^{2})
  - Water: 0 sq mi (0.00 km^{2})
- Elevation: 692 ft (211 m)

Population (2020)
  - Total: 220
  - Density: 376.9/sq mi (145.51/km^{2})
- Time zone: UTC-6 (Central (CST))
  - Summer (DST): UTC-5 (CDT)
- ZIP code: 74522
- Area codes: 539/918
- FIPS code: 40-01150
- GNIS feature ID: 2412346

Alderson is a town in Pittsburg County, Oklahoma, United States. As of the 2020 census, Alderson had a population of 220.

== History ==
A post office was established at Alderson, Indian Territory on March 5, 1890. It was named for William Charles Alderson, treasure of the Choctaw, Oklahoma and Gulf Railroad. W.C. Alderson, under the name "Willy," was one of the children written about and the source of much of the material in Mary Howitt's Our Cousins in Ohio (1849).

At the time of its founding, Alderson was located in Tobucksy County, a part of the Moshulatubbee District of the Choctaw Nation.

Alderson was linked to McAlester, Krebs, Bache, Haileyville, and Hartshorne by the Pittsburg County Railway interurban from 1903 to 1946.

== Geography ==
According to the United States Census Bureau, the town has a total area of 0.5 square miles (1.3 km^{2}), all land.

== Demographics ==
Historical population
Census	Pop.	Note	%±
1910	786		—
1920	855		8.8%
1930	421		−50.8%
1940	340		−19.2%
1950	311		−8.5%
1960	207		−33.4%
1970	215		3.9%
1980	366		70.2%
1990	395		7.9%
2000	261		−33.9%
2010	304		16.5%
2020	220		−27.6%
U.S. Decennial Census

=== 2020 census ===
As of the 2020 census, Alderson had a population of 220. The median age was 46.5 years. 21.4% of residents were under the age of 18 and 20.9% of residents were 65 years of age or older. For every 100 females there were 105.6 males, and for every 100 females age 18 and over there were 90.1 males age 18 and over.

90.5% of residents lived in urban areas, while 9.5% lived in rural areas.

There were 85 households in Alderson, of which 30.6% had children under the age of 18 living in them. Of all households, 51.8% were married-couple households, 22.4% were households with a male householder and no spouse or partner present, and 24.7% were households with a female householder and no spouse or partner present. About 21.1% of all households were made up of individuals and 7.1% had someone living alone who was 65 years of age or older.

There were 107 housing units, of which 20.6% were vacant. The homeowner vacancy rate was 1.3% and the rental vacancy rate was 22.2%.

Racial composition as of the 2020 census
Race	Number	Percent
White	140	63.6%
Black or African American	8	3.6%
American Indian and Alaska Native	28	12.7%
Asian	0	0.0%
Native Hawaiian and Other Pacific Islander	0	0.0%
Some other race	4	1.8%
Two or more races	40	18.2%
Hispanic or Latino (of any race)	19	8.6%

=== 2010 census ===
As of the census of 2010, there were 304 people living in the town. The population density was 610 inhabitants per square mile (240/km^{2}). There were 129 housing units at an average density of 225 per square mile (90/km^{2}). The racial makeup of the town was 67.05% White, 3.45% African American, 18.77% Native American, 0.38% Asian, 0.38% from other races, and 9.96% from two or more races. Hispanic or Latino of any race were 1.92% of the population.

There were 97 households, out of which 36.1% had children under the age of 18 living with them. 27.8% of all households were made up of individuals, and 10.3% had someone living alone who was 65 years of age or older. The average household size was 2.69 and the average family size was 3.32.

In the town, the population was spread out, with 31.8% under the age of 18, 6.9% from 18 to 24, 25.3% from 25 to 44, 22.2% from 45 to 64, and 13.8% who were 65 years of age or older. The median age was 37 years. For every 100 females, there were 107.1 males. For every 100 females age 18 and over, there were 97.8 males.

The median income for a household in the town was $23,750, and the median income for a family was $31,250. Males had a median income of $23,750 versus $17,292 for females. The per capita income for the town was $11,513. About 14.0% of families and 20.0% of the population were below the poverty line, including 18.2% of those under the age of eighteen and 26.7% of those sixty five or over.
