= Longtown, Oklahoma =

- CDP
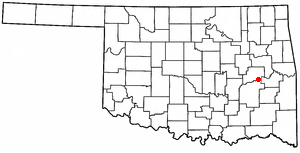
- Location of Longtown, Oklahoma
- Coordinates: 35°13′37″N 95°31′13″W
- Country: United States
- State: Oklahoma
- County: Pittsburg

Area
  - Total: 35.75 sq mi (92.58 km^{2})
  - Land: 26.12 sq mi (67.64 km^{2})
  - Water: 9.63 sq mi (24.95 km^{2})
- Elevation: 627 ft (191 m)

Population (2020)
  - Total: 2,659
  - Density: 101.8/sq mi (39.31/km^{2})
- Time zone: UTC-6 (Central (CST))
  - Summer (DST): UTC-5 (CDT)
- FIPS code: 40-43975
- GNIS feature ID: 2408127

Longtown is a census-designated place (CDP) and unincorporated community in Pittsburg County, Oklahoma, United States. As of the 2020 census, Longtown had a population of 2,659.

== History ==
At the time of its founding, Longtown was located in Tobucksy County, Choctaw Nation, in the Indian Territory. Longtown Creek formed the boundary between Tobucksy and Gaines County.

== Geography ==
According to the United States Census Bureau, the CDP has a total area of 36.1 square miles (93 km^{2}), of which 26.5 square miles (69 km^{2}) is land and 9.5 square miles (25 km^{2}) (26.43%) is water.

== Demographics ==
Historical population
Census	Pop.	Note	%±
2020	2,659		—
U.S. Decennial Census

=== 2020 census ===
As of the 2020 census, Longtown had a population of 2,659. The median age was 55.7 years. 14.0% of residents were under the age of 18 and 33.3% of residents were 65 years of age or older. For every 100 females there were 100.8 males, and for every 100 females age 18 and over there were 99.1 males age 18 and over.

0.0% of residents lived in urban areas, while 100.0% lived in rural areas.

There were 1,229 households in Longtown, of which 16.0% had children under the age of 18 living in them. Of all households, 49.7% were married-couple households, 21.8% were households with a male householder and no spouse or partner present, and 23.4% were households with a female householder and no spouse or partner present. About 32.1% of all households were made up of individuals and 17.0% had someone living alone who was 65 years of age or older.

There were 2,594 housing units, of which 52.6% were vacant. The homeowner vacancy rate was 2.0% and the rental vacancy rate was 6.9%.

Racial composition as of the 2020 census
Race	Number	Percent
White	2,022	76.0%
Black or African American	8	0.3%
American Indian and Alaska Native	267	10.0%
Asian	4	0.2%
Native Hawaiian and Other Pacific Islander	2	0.1%
Some other race	19	0.7%
Two or more races	337	12.7%
Hispanic or Latino (of any race)	83	3.1%

=== 2000 census ===
As of the census of 2000, there were 2,397 people, 1,101 households, and 778 families residing in the CDP. The population density was 90.4 inhabitants per square mile (34.9/km^{2}). There were 3,059 housing units at an average density of 115.3 per square mile (44.5/km^{2}). The racial makeup of the CDP was 88.36% White, 0.13% African American, 7.76% Native American, 0.04% Asian, 0.17% from other races, and 3.55% from two or more races. Hispanic or Latino of any race were 0.83% of the population.

There were 1,101 households, out of which 17.7% had children under the age of 18 living with them, 61.9% were married couples living together, 5.9% had a female householder with no husband present, and 29.3% were non-families. 26.2% of all households were made up of individuals, and 11.7% had someone living alone who was 65 years of age or older. The average household size was 2.18 and the average family size was 2.57.

In the CDP, the population was spread out, with 16.8% under the age of 18, 3.9% from 18 to 24, 19.0% from 25 to 44, 35.6% from 45 to 64, and 24.7% who were 65 years of age or older. The median age was 52 years. For every 100 females, there were 103.1 males. For every 100 females age 18 and over, there were 98.3 males.

The median income for a household in the CDP was $26,813, and the median income for a family was $33,060. Males had a median income of $29,625 versus $19,737 for females. The per capita income for the CDP was $15,722. About 12.4% of families and 13.7% of the population were below the poverty line, including 13.9% of those under age 18 and 10.8% of those age 65 or over.
