= Crowder, Oklahoma =

- Town
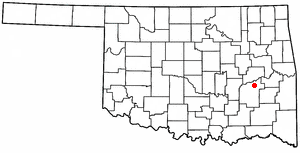
- Location of Crowder, Oklahoma
- Coordinates: 35°07′22″N 95°40′05″W
- Country: United States
- State: Oklahoma
- County: Pittsburg

Area
  - Total: 3.06 sq mi (7.93 km^{2})
  - Land: 2.05 sq mi (5.31 km^{2})
  - Water: 1.01 sq mi (2.62 km^{2})
- Elevation: 643 ft (196 m)

Population (2020)
  - Total: 306
  - Density: 149.2/sq mi (57.61/km^{2})
- Time zone: UTC-6 (Central (CST))
  - Summer (DST): UTC-5 (CDT)
- ZIP code: 74430
- Area codes: 539/918
- FIPS code: 40-18550
- GNIS feature ID: 2412393

Crowder is a town in Pittsburg County, Oklahoma, United States. As of the 2020 census, the community had 306 residents.

== History ==
At the time of its founding, Crowder was located in Tobucksy County, Choctaw Nation, in the Indian Territory. The settlement was originally called Juanita, after Juanita Harlan Crowder, wife of Dr. W.E. Crowder, an early-day physician. A post office was established at Juanita, Indian Territory on March 21, 1902. Its name was changed to Crowder on June 4, 1904, in honor of Dr. Crowder.

== Geography ==
According to the United States Census Bureau, the town has a total area of 1.0 square mile (2.6 km^{2}), of which 1.0 square mile (2.6 km^{2}) is land and 0.04 square miles (0.10 km^{2}) (2.97%) is water.

== Demographics ==
Historical population
Census	Pop.	Note	%±
1910	529		—
1920	581		9.8%
1930	340		−41.5%
1940	378		11.2%
1950	267		−29.4%
1960	254		−4.9%
1970	339		33.5%
1980	431		27.1%
1990	339		−21.3%
2000	436		28.6%
2010	430		−1.4%
2020	306		−28.8%
U.S. Decennial Census

=== 2020 census ===
As of the 2020 census, Crowder had a population of 306. The median age was 43.5 years. 21.9% of residents were under the age of 18 and 22.2% of residents were 65 years of age or older. For every 100 females there were 91.2 males, and for every 100 females age 18 and over there were 88.2 males age 18 and over.

0.0% of residents lived in urban areas, while 100.0% lived in rural areas.

There were 129 households in Crowder, of which 41.1% had children under the age of 18 living in them. Of all households, 51.9% were married-couple households, 14.7% were households with a male householder and no spouse or partner present, and 24.8% were households with a female householder and no spouse or partner present. About 17.8% of all households were made up of individuals and 7.0% had someone living alone who was 65 years of age or older.

There were 148 housing units, of which 12.8% were vacant. The homeowner vacancy rate was 0.0% and the rental vacancy rate was 0.0%.

Racial composition as of the 2020 census
Race	Number	Percent
White	236	77.1%
Black or African American	0	0.0%
American Indian and Alaska Native	39	12.7%
Asian	0	0.0%
Native Hawaiian and Other Pacific Islander	0	0.0%
Some other race	0	0.0%
Two or more races	31	10.1%
Hispanic or Latino (of any race)	5	1.6%

=== 2000 census ===
As of the census of 2000, there were 436 people, 159 households, and 127 families residing in the town. The population density was 446.0 inhabitants per square mile (172.2/km^{2}). There were 183 housing units at an average density of 187.2 per square mile (72.3/km^{2}). The racial makeup of the town was 85.09% White, 0.92% African American, 7.80% Native American, 0.46% Asian, 2.52% from other races, and 3.21% from two or more races. Hispanic or Latino of any race were 2.75% of the population.

There were 159 households, out of which 41.5% had children under the age of 18 living with them, 56.6% were married couples living together, 17.0% had a female householder with no husband present, and 19.5% were non-families. 17.6% of all households were made up of individuals, and 6.9% had someone living alone who was 65 years of age or older. The average household size was 2.74 and the average family size was 3.05.

In the town, the population was spread out, with 33.0% under the age of 18, 6.0% from 18 to 24, 25.0% from 25 to 44, 23.4% from 45 to 64, and 12.6% who were 65 years of age or older. The median age was 34 years. For every 100 females, there were 85.5 males. For every 100 females age 18 and over, there were 89.6 males.

The median income for a household in the town was $27,500, and the median income for a family was $31,364. Males had a median income of $25,833 versus $17,115 for females. The per capita income for the town was $11,394. About 11.7% of families and 15.8% of the population were below the poverty line, including 19.7% of those under age 18 and 19.2% of those age 65 or over.
