= Haileyville, Oklahoma =

- City
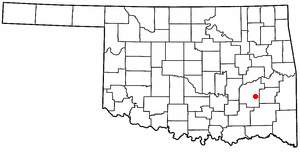
- Location of Haileyville, Oklahoma
- Coordinates: 34°51′15″N 95°34′42″W
- Country: United States
- State: Oklahoma
- County: Pittsburg

Area
  - Total: 1.03 sq mi (2.68 km^{2})
  - Land: 1.03 sq mi (2.68 km^{2})
  - Water: 0.0039 sq mi (0.01 km^{2})
- Elevation: 650 ft (200 m)

Population (2020)
  - Total: 716
  - Density: 692.5/sq mi (267.38/km^{2})
- Time zone: UTC-6 (Central (CST))
  - Summer (DST): UTC-5 (CDT)
- ZIP code: 74546
- Area codes: 539/918
- FIPS code: 40-31900
- GNIS feature ID: 2410682
- Website: haileyville.municipalimpact.com

Haileyville is a city in Pittsburg County, Oklahoma, United States. The population was 716 at the time of the 2020 United States census.

== History ==
Located in Pittsburg County, Haileyville lies at the junction of U.S. Route 270#OklahomaU.S. Route 270/State Highway 1 and State Highway 63, fourteen miles east of McAlester and a little more than one mile west of Hartshorne. The French explorer Jean Baptiste Bénard de La Harpe first mapped the site of Haileyville in 1719 during his expedition to the Arkansas River. In 1898 D. M. Hailey, M.D., established the town of Haileyville, when he claimed a tract of land east of McAlester and opened the area's first coal mines. A Confederate veteran, Hailey had first moved into Indian Territory in 1868 to practice medicine and before long had become involved in several business ventures. His mining investments began when he and James Elliot started the Hailey-Ola Mining Company, leasing coal land from the Choctaw, Oklahoma and Gulf Railroad, which laid tracks in the area in 1889–90. The first mine, named Number One Slope, began production on St. Patrick's Day in 1899.

Haileyville, in the Choctaw Nation, was a company town, which was a common feature of coal-mining communities. Italians, American Indians, Russians, and Americans comprised most of Haileyville, and many worked in the mines or on the railroads. Coal from the area was only profitable due to the railroad junction. The town was home to the freight and passenger offices of the Choctaw, Oklahoma, and Gulf Railroad, which later became the Chicago, Rock Island and Pacific Railway Company (Rock Island). By 1902 the railroad had 1,052 miles of track, including a branch from the town that ran to Ardmore. Haileyville remained the division point of the Rock Island Railroad until 1958, when the offices moved to El Reno.

On April 20, 1901, the U.S. Post Office Department established a post office at Haileyville, Indian Territory. The 1907 population stood at 1,452, and it climbed to 2,024 in 1910. In 1911 a bank, the New State newspaper, five hotels, three doctors, and several retail and other businesses served the residents. The community and its close neighbor, Hartshorne, are known as the "twin cities" of Pittsburg County due to their proximity. Governor Lee Cruce proclaimed Haileyville a first class city on February 12, 1912. After a 2,067 population in 1920, the number of residents declined to 1,801 in 1930, 1,183 in 1940, and 922 in 1960. In 1946 one coal company, a bank, and an ice plant were the main businesses, with gas stations, grocery stores, and a hardware store. After the coal mines closed, lumber, farming, and ranching became the primary modes of production.

At the time of its founding, Haileyville was located in Gaines County, a part of the Moshulatubbee District of the Choctaw Nation.

Haileyville was linked to McAlester, Krebs, Alderson, Bache, and Hartshorne by the Pittsburg County Railway interurban from 1903 to 1946.

== Geography ==
According to the United States Census Bureau, the city has a total area of 1.0 square mile (2.6 km^{2}), all land.

== Demographics ==
Historical population
Census	Pop.	Note	%±
1910	2,024		—
1920	2,067		2.1%
1930	1,801		−12.9%
1940	1,183		−34.3%
1950	1,107		−6.4%
1960	922		−16.7%
1970	928		0.7%
1980	832		−10.3%
1990	918		10.3%
2000	891		−2.9%
2010	813		−8.8%
2020	716		−11.9%
U.S. Decennial Census

=== 2020 census ===
As of the 2020 census, Haileyville had a population of 716. The median age was 42.2 years. 23.7% of residents were under the age of 18 and 20.4% of residents were 65 years of age or older. For every 100 females there were 92.5 males, and for every 100 females age 18 and over there were 86.3 males age 18 and over.

0% of residents lived in urban areas, while 100.0% lived in rural areas.

There were 289 households in Haileyville, of which 32.5% had children under the age of 18 living in them. Of all households, 39.8% were married-couple households, 18.3% were households with a male householder and no spouse or partner present, and 33.2% were households with a female householder and no spouse or partner present. About 28.3% of all households were made up of individuals and 15.9% had someone living alone who was 65 years of age or older.

There were 344 housing units, of which 16.0% were vacant. Among occupied housing units, 72.3% were owner-occupied and 27.7% were renter-occupied. The homeowner vacancy rate was 2.7% and the rental vacancy rate was 15.8%.

Racial composition as of the 2020 census
Race	Percent
White	67.2%
Black or African American	1.1%
American Indian and Alaska Native	16.8%
Asian	0%
Native Hawaiian and Other Pacific Islander	0%
Some other race	0.6%
Two or more races	14.4%
Hispanic or Latino (of any race)	1.4%

=== 2000 census ===
As of the 2000 census, there were 891 people, 375 households, and 253 families residing in the city. The population density was 872.8 inhabitants per square mile (337.0/km^{2}). There were 452 housing units at an average density of 442.8 per square mile (171.0/km^{2}). The racial makeup of the city was 69.81% White, 0.67% African American, 21.89% Native American, 0.34% Asian, 0.56% from other races, and 6.73% from two or more races. Hispanic or Latino of any race were 2.24% of the population.

There were 375 households, out of which 29.3% had children under the age of 18 living with them, 50.4% were married couples living together, 13.9% had a female householder with no husband present, and 32.3% were non-families. 30.1% of all households were made up of individuals, and 12.8% had someone living alone who was 65 years of age or older. The average household size was 2.38 and the average family size was 2.96.

In the city, the population was spread out, with 26.4% under the age of 18, 9.4% from 18 to 24, 24.9% from 25 to 44, 23.9% from 45 to 64, and 15.4% who were 65 years of age or older. The median age was 36 years. For every 100 females, there were 93.7 males. For every 100 females age 18 and over, there were 90.7 males.

The median income for a household in the city was $26,833, and the median income for a family was $29,600. Males had a median income of $29,688 versus $22,500 for females. The per capita income for the city was $13,326. About 14.8% of families and 17.7% of the population were below the poverty line, including 21.4% of those under age 18 and 15.4% of those age 65 or over.

== Education ==
Most of the town is zoned to Haileyville Public Schools while a portion is zoned to Hartshorne Public Schools.
