= Ti, Oklahoma =

- Unincorporated community
- Location within Oklahoma
- Coordinates: 34°42′33″N 95°39′41″W
- Country: United States
- State: Oklahoma
- County: Pittsburg
- Elevation: 751 ft (229 m)
- Time zone: UTC-6 (Central (CST))
  - Summer (DST): UTC-5 (CDT)
- Area codes: 539/918
- GNIS feature ID: 1100885

Ti is an unincorporated community in Pittsburg County, Oklahoma, United States. Ti is 11 miles (18 km) southwest of Hartshorne.

The community's name is a reversed acronym of Indian Territory. The locale is old enough to appear on a 1911 Rand McNally map of the county.

== See also ==
- List of geographic names derived from anagrams and ananyms
