= Arpelar, Oklahoma =

- Unincorporated community and Census designated place
- Location within Oklahoma Location within the United States
- Coordinates: 34°56′08″N 95°57′32″W
- Country: United States
- State: Oklahoma
- County: Pittsburg

Area
  - Total: 2.23 sq mi (5.77 km^{2})
  - Land: 2.23 sq mi (5.77 km^{2})
  - Water: 0.0039 sq mi (0.01 km^{2})
- Elevation: 735 ft (224 m)

Population (2020)
  - Total: 291
  - Density: 130.7/sq mi (50.48/km^{2})
- Time zone: UTC-6 (Central (CST))
  - Summer (DST): UTC-5 (CDT)
- Area codes: 918 & 539
- GNIS feature ID: 2629904

Arpelar is an unincorporated community and census-designated place in Pittsburg County, Oklahoma, United States. Its population was 291 as of the 2020 census. U.S. Route 270 and Oklahoma State Highway 1 pass through the community.

== History ==
Arpelar was named after Aaron Arpelar, a county judge of Tobucksy County in the Choctaw Nation. At the time of its founding, Arpelar was located in Tobucksy County. A post office was established at Arpelar, Indian Territory on February 25, 1903. It closed on June 30, 1934.

== Geography ==
According to the U.S. Census Bureau, the community has an area of 2.229 square miles (5.77 km^{2}); 2.226 square miles (5.77 km^{2}) of its area is land, and 0.003 square miles (0.0078 km^{2}) is water.

== Demographics ==
Historical population
Census	Pop.	Note	%±
2020	291		—
U.S. Decennial Census

=== 2020 census ===
As of the 2020 census, Arpelar had a population of 291. The median age was 51.9 years. 16.2% of residents were under the age of 18 and 23.4% of residents were 65 years of age or older. For every 100 females there were 86.5 males, and for every 100 females age 18 and over there were 87.7 males age 18 and over.

0.0% of residents lived in urban areas, while 100.0% lived in rural areas.

There were 123 households in Arpelar, of which 22.0% had children under the age of 18 living in them. Of all households, 59.3% were married-couple households, 19.5% were households with a male householder and no spouse or partner present, and 18.7% were households with a female householder and no spouse or partner present. About 26.8% of all households were made up of individuals and 17.0% had someone living alone who was 65 years of age or older.

There were 136 housing units, of which 9.6% were vacant. The homeowner vacancy rate was 1.8% and the rental vacancy rate was 0.0%.

Racial composition as of the 2020 census
Race	Number	Percent
White	209	71.8%
Black or African American	0	0.0%
American Indian and Alaska Native	39	13.4%
Asian	2	0.7%
Native Hawaiian and Other Pacific Islander	0	0.0%
Some other race	3	1.0%
Two or more races	38	13.1%
Hispanic or Latino (of any race)	11	3.8%
