= Blocker, Oklahoma =

Unincorporated community in Oklahoma, US

Coordinates: 35.061486°N 95.568317°W

Blocker is an unincorporated community located on State Highway 31 in Pittsburg County, Oklahoma, United States. The post office opened April 26, 1905. The ZIP code is 74529. The community is said to have been named for a local coal dealer, Eads Blocker. At the time of its founding, Blocker was located in Gaines County, Choctaw Nation, in the Indian Territory.
