= Bache, Oklahoma =

- Unincorporated community and Census designated place
- Location within Oklahoma Location within the United States
- Coordinates: 34°53′39″N 95°39′02″W
- Country: United States
- State: Oklahoma
- County: Pittsburg

Area
  - Total: 0.32 sq mi (0.83 km^{2})
  - Land: 0.32 sq mi (0.83 km^{2})
  - Water: 0 sq mi (0.00 km^{2})
- Elevation: 755 ft (230 m)

Population (2020)
  - Total: 105
  - Density: 326.0/sq mi (125.86/km^{2})
- Time zone: UTC-6 (Central (CST))
  - Summer (DST): UTC-5 (CDT)
- Area codes: 918 & 539
- GNIS feature ID: 2629905

Bache is an unincorporated community in Pittsburg County, Oklahoma, United States. The community is located on U.S. Route 270, 7 miles (11 km) east of McAlester. As of the 2020 census, Bache had a population of 105.

A post office was established at Bache, Indian Territory on February 26, 1903. It closed on July 29, 1995.

At the time of its founding, the community was located in the Moshulatubbee District of the Choctaw Nation. The community was named for mining operator Franklin Bache.

Bache was linked to McAlester, Krebs, Alderson, Haileyville, and Hartshorne by the Pittsburg County Railway interurban from 1903 to 1946.

== Demographics ==
Historical population
Census	Pop.	Note	%±
2020	105		—
U.S. Decennial Census

=== 2020 census ===
As of the 2020 census, Bache had a population of 105. The median age was 48.3 years. 20.0% of residents were under the age of 18 and 28.6% of residents were 65 years of age or older. For every 100 females there were 176.3 males, and for every 100 females age 18 and over there were 162.5 males age 18 and over.

0.0% of residents lived in urban areas, while 100.0% lived in rural areas.

There were 45 households in Bache, of which 20.0% had children under the age of 18 living in them. Of all households, 37.8% were married-couple households, 51.1% were households with a male householder and no spouse or partner present, and 2.2% were households with a female householder and no spouse or partner present. About 48.9% of all households were made up of individuals and 28.9% had someone living alone who was 65 years of age or older.

There were 55 housing units, of which 18.2% were vacant. The homeowner vacancy rate was 0.0% and the rental vacancy rate was 0.0%.

Racial composition as of the 2020 census
Race	Number	Percent
White	78	74.3%
Black or African American	1	1.0%
American Indian and Alaska Native	15	14.3%
Asian	0	0.0%
Native Hawaiian and Other Pacific Islander	0	0.0%
Some other race	1	1.0%
Two or more races	10	9.5%
Hispanic or Latino (of any race)	2	1.9%
