= Jones Academy =

Jones Academy may refer to:

- Jones Futures Academy - Houston, Texas - Houston Independent School District
- Jones Academy - Oklahoma
- Jimmy and Laura Jones Academy of Fine Arts and Dual Language - Arlington Independent School District - Arlington, Texas
