= Ashland, Oklahoma =

- Town
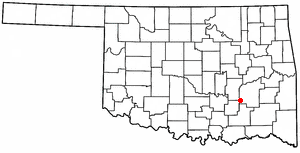
- Location of Ashland, Oklahoma
- Coordinates: 34°46′01″N 96°04′14″W
- Country: United States
- State: Oklahoma
- County: Pittsburg

Area
  - Total: 0.20 sq mi (0.52 km^{2})
  - Land: 0.20 sq mi (0.51 km^{2})
  - Water: 0.0039 sq mi (0.01 km^{2})
- Elevation: 771 ft (235 m)

Population (2020)
  - Total: 35
  - Density: 176.1/sq mi (68.01/km^{2})
- Time zone: UTC-6 (Central (CST))
  - Summer (DST): UTC-5 (CDT)
- FIPS code: 40-03050
- GNIS feature ID: 2411649

Ashland is a town in Pittsburg County, Oklahoma, United States. As of the 2020 census, Ashland had a population of 35.

== History ==
Residents of the young community applied for a United States Post Office to be established using the name "Pearl City." Postal officials did not agree to their choice of names, doubtless because of the existence of a post office at Pearl in Woodward County, Oklahoma Territory. Federal officials were already anticipating the union of the "twin territories" into a single state, and postal officials did not want two post offices in the same state using such similar names. They substituted Ashland instead, and a post office opened at Ashland, Indian Territory on October 1, 1902. At the time of its founding, Ashland was located in Tobucksy County, Choctaw Nation.

== Geography ==
According to the United States Census Bureau, the town has a total area of 0.2 square miles (0.52 km^{2}), all land.

== Demographics ==
Historical population
Census	Pop.	Note	%±
1930	131		—
1940	142		8.4%
1950	104		−26.8%
1960	87		−16.3%
1970	73		−16.1%
1980	72		−1.4%
1990	56		−22.2%
2000	53		−5.4%
2010	66		24.5%
2020	35		−47.0%
U.S. Decennial Census

=== 2020 census ===
As of the 2020 census, Ashland had a population of 35. The median age was 46.3 years. 20.0% of residents were under the age of 18 and 20.0% of residents were 65 years of age or older. For every 100 females there were 94.4 males, and for every 100 females age 18 and over there were 86.7 males age 18 and over.

0.0% of residents lived in urban areas, while 100.0% lived in rural areas.

There were 28 households in Ashland, of which 50.0% had children under the age of 18 living in them. Of all households, 35.7% were married-couple households, 32.1% were households with a male householder and no spouse or partner present, and 28.6% were households with a female householder and no spouse or partner present. About 28.6% of all households were made up of individuals and 10.7% had someone living alone who was 65 years of age or older.

There were 29 housing units, of which 3.4% were vacant. The homeowner vacancy rate was 0.0% and the rental vacancy rate was 0.0%.

Racial composition as of the 2020 census
Race	Number	Percent
White	23	65.7%
Black or African American	0	0.0%
American Indian and Alaska Native	9	25.7%
Asian	0	0.0%
Native Hawaiian and Other Pacific Islander	0	0.0%
Some other race	0	0.0%
Two or more races	3	8.6%
Hispanic or Latino (of any race)	3	8.6%

=== 2010 census ===
As of the census of 2010, there were 66 people living in the town. The population density was 273.3 inhabitants per square mile (105.5/km^{2}). There were 27 housing units at an average density of 139.2 per square mile (53.7/km^{2}). The racial makeup of the town was 60.38% White, 26.42% Native American, and 13.21% from two or more races. Hispanic or Latino of any race were 5.66% of the population.

There were 19 households, out of which 47.4% had children under the age of 18 living with them, 57.9% were married couples living together, 21.1% had a female householder with no husband present, and 21.1% were non-families. 15.8% of all households were made up of individuals, and 10.5% had someone living alone who was 65 years of age or older. The average household size was 2.79 and the average family size was 3.07.

In the town, the population was spread out, with 30.2% under the age of 18, 13.2% from 18 to 24, 26.4% from 25 to 44, 15.1% from 45 to 64, and 15.1% who were 65 years of age or older. The median age was 30 years. For every 100 females, there were 130.4 males. For every 100 females age 18 and over, there were 117.6 males.

The median income for a household in the town was $30,833, and the median income for a family was $30,417. Males had a median income of $24,375 versus $0 for females. The per capita income for the town was $6,981. There were 20.0% of families and 19.2% of the population living below the poverty line, including 26.7% of under eighteens and 16.7% of those over 64.
