= Cole Chapel School =

- U.S. National Register of Historic Places
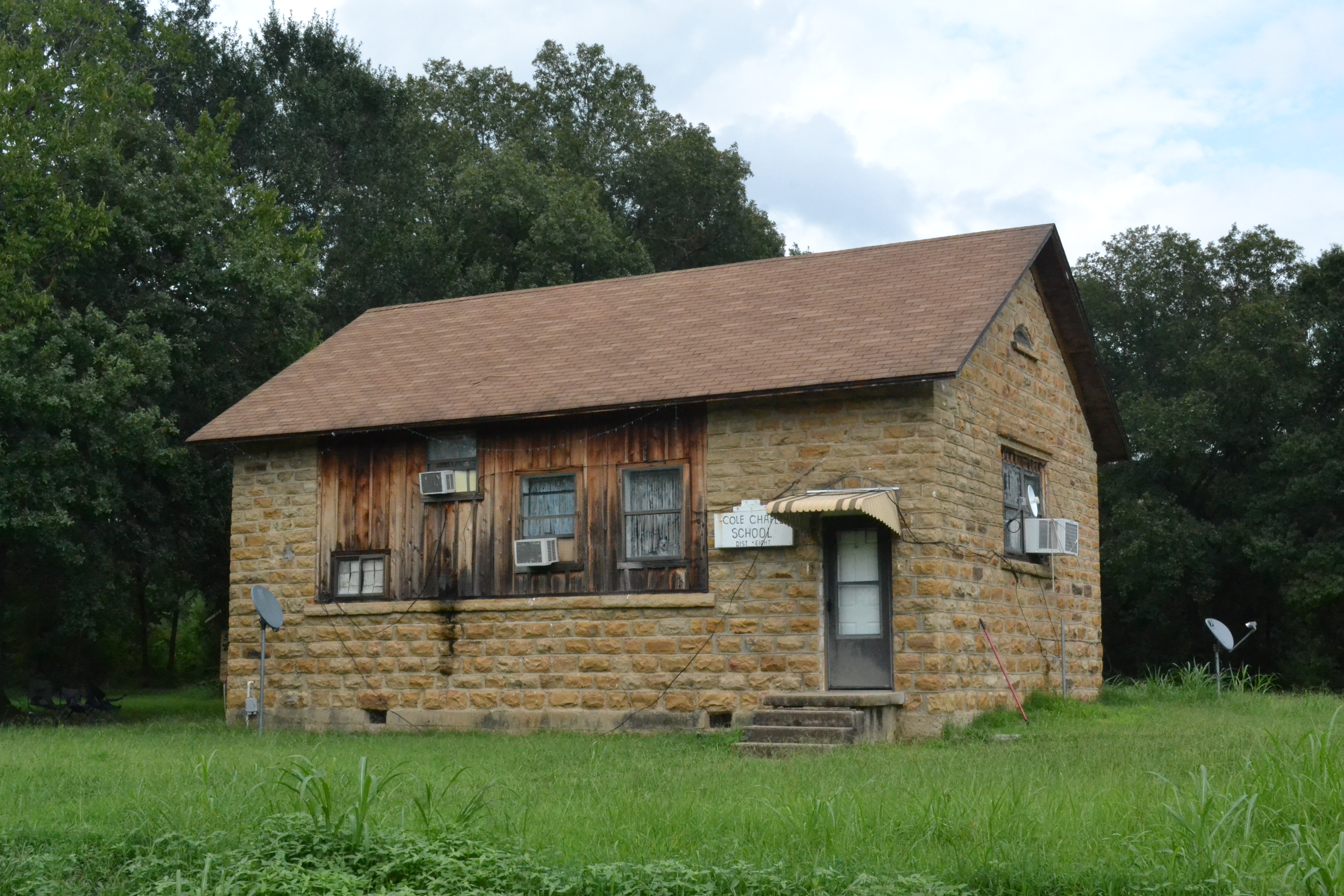

- Location within Oklahoma Location within the United States
- Nearest city: Hartshorne, Oklahoma
- Coordinates: 34°54′20″N 95°32′33″W
- Area: 2 acres (0.81 ha)
- Built: 1936
- Architect: Oklahoma State Dept. of Education pattern book
- Architectural style: Vernacular Richardsonian Romanesque
- MPS: WPA Public Bldgs., Recreational Facilities and Cemetery Improvements in Southeastern Oklahoma, 1935--1943 TR
- NRHP reference No.: 88001411
- Added to NRHP: September 8, 1988

Cole Chapel School is a historic school in Hartshorne, Oklahoma. It was built in 1936 and was added to the National Register of Historic Places in 1988.
