= Gaines County, Choctaw Nation =

Gaines County was a political subdivision of the Choctaw Nation of Indian Territory, prior to Oklahoma being admitted as a state. The county formed part of the Nation's Moshulatubbee District, or First District, one of three administrative super-regions.

== History ==
The county was also called Gaines Creek County or Kenis Kaunti (Kenis rhymes with “they”), a translation from the Choctaw word for Gaines Creek. The county was named for Gaines Creek, which formed one of its borders. The creek, originally known as the South Fork of the Canadian River, was a regionally significant waterway.

Gaines Creek is thought to take its name from U.S. Army Colonel George S. Gaines, a licensed trader among the Choctaws prior to their removal from the southeastern United States. Col. Gaines accompanied a Choctaw exploration party to the Indian Territory in 1830, where they met with a similar party of Chickasaw Indians on the banks of what is now Gaines Creek. Their trip was shortly after the signing of the Treaty of Dancing Rabbit Creek.

Gaines County did not include any towns of size. Its principal geographic features were Gaines Creek, Longtown Creek, the Sans Bois Mountains, and other area mountains. Settlement was confined mostly to the valleys and lowlands, with farming and mining being the major activities. Mining occurred primarily in the southern end of the county along the Choctaw Coal and Railway, an east-west railroad linking the mines at Haileyville and Hartshorne, which were located in Gaines County, with those in McAlester in Tobucksy County and Wilburton in San Bois County.

The Butterfield Stage Route passed through the county and included stops at Gaines Court House, Riddle’s Station, Pusley’s Station, Buffalo Station, Blackburn’s Station, and Colbert’s Stage Stand. None of these were population centers, including Gaines Court House, which was busy only during sessions of the county court.

Gaines County was one of the original 19 counties created by the General Council of the Choctaw Nation in 1850. The county's boundaries were established and designated according to easily recognizable natural landmarks, as were the boundaries of all Choctaw Nation counties. According to the enabling legislation enacted by the Choctaw General Council which established the county, its boundaries were Longtown Creek, up the Canadian River to the mouth of Gaines Creek, then up Gaines Creek to the mouth of Brushy Creek, then up Brushy Creek to the dividing ridge separating the watersheds of the Canadian River and Red River, and on to the boundary line of Sugar Loaf County. The dividing ridge also served as boundary between the Moshulatubbee District and Apukshunnubbee District.

The county served as an election district for members of the National Council, and as a unit of local administration. Constitutional officers, all of whom served for two-year terms and were elected by the voters, included the county judge, sheriff, and a ranger. The judge's duties included oversight of overall county administration. The sheriff collected taxes, monitored unlawful intrusion by intruders (usually white Americans from the United States), and conducted the census. The county ranger advertised and sold strayed livestock.

== Statehood ==
As Oklahoma's statehood approached, its leading citizens, who were gathered for the Oklahoma Constitutional Convention, realized in laying out the future state's counties that, while logically designed, the Choctaw Nation's counties could not exist as economically viable political subdivisions. In most the county seat existed generally for holding county court and not as a population center. This was certainly true of sparsely populated Gaines County.

This conundrum was also recognized by the framers of the proposed State of Sequoyah, who met in 1905 to propose statehood for the Indian Territory. The Sequoyah Constitutional Convention also proposed a county structure that abolished the Choctaw counties. Gaines County was divided principally into the proposed Eufaula and San Bois counties, with a small southern area assigned to the proposed Hailey County.

Almost none of this proposition was borrowed two years later by Oklahoma's framers, who adopted a very different county structure for the region. The territory formerly comprising Gaines County, Choctaw Nation now falls primarily within Pittsburg County and Haskell County. Gaines County ceased to exist upon Oklahoma's statehood on November 16, 1907.
