= Ed Jeffers =

American football player (1921–2010)

No. 35
- Position: Guard

Personal information
- Born: December 6, 1921; Hartshorne, Oklahoma, U.S.
- Died: April 4, 2010 (aged 88); Hobbs, New Mexico, U.S.
- Listed height: 6 ft 3 in (1.91 m)
- Listed weight: 215 lb (98 kg)

Career information
- College: Oklahoma; Oklahoma State
- NFL draft: 1945: 19th round, 197th overall pick

Career history
- Brooklyn Dodgers (1947)

Career NFL statistics
- Games played: 14
- Stats at Pro Football Reference

Edward Francis Jeffers (December 6, 1921 – April 4, 2010) was an American professional football guard. He was a member of the Brooklyn Dodgers.

He served his country in the United States Army during World War II in the Pacific. He was the recipient of the Distinguished Service Cross, Silver Star with Clusters, Bronze Star Medal with Clusters and two Purple Hearts. He was discharged as a sergeant.

He graduated from McAlester High School in the Class of 1939. He later graduated from Oklahoma State University, where he played football. After graduation, he played professional football with the Brooklyn Dodgers.

He married Leota Curliss in 1950, in Hartshorne. He was an educator for more than 35 years and was the football coach at Hartshorne in the 1950s. He taught and was a football coach at Houston Junior High for 32 years in Hobbs, New Mexico. He and his wife raised 4 sons.
