= Pittsburg County Railway =

Overview
- Headquarters: McAlester
- Locale: Oklahoma
- Dates of operation: 1903–1946

Technical
- Track gauge: 4 ft 8 1/2 in (1,435 mm) standard gauge
- Length: 23.29 miles (37.48 km)

Beginning life as the Indian Territory Traction Co. and then the Choctaw Railway & Lighting Co., the Pittsburg County Railway was a long-lived interurban running between McAlester, Oklahoma and Hartshorne, Oklahoma. It lasted from 1903 until 1946.

== History ==
=== Indian Territory Traction Co. ===
The Indian Territory Traction Co. was granted its franchise December 10, 1901 for a period of 40 years. Its proposed route map was accepted by the Secretary of the Interior on July 25, 1903. The basic system was built In the 1903-1904 timeframe. It first linked the northern and southern parts of what became the unified town of McAlester in 1907, the area being a coal mining and rail transportation center. It continued southeast through Krebs, Alderson, Bache, and Haileyville before terminating in Hartshorne.

=== Choctaw Railway & Lighting Co. ===
After the franchise was passed through a third party to the Choctaw Electric Co., Indian Territory Electric was consolidated with Choctaw Electric to form Choctaw Railway & Lighting Co. on February 1, 1908. When the power company was split from the transportation business in 1916, the transportation side was incorporated as the Pittsburg County Railway Co. on June 24 of that year. On August 27, 1928, this became a subsidiary of Public Service Company of Oklahoma (“PSO”).

The system under PSO consisted of the 18.44-mile main line, but spur lines within towns and connecting track to other railroads brought total trackage to about 23.29 miles. The railway carried both passengers and freight, the latter consisting of mail and (mostly) grains, particularly corn and oats.

=== Abandonment ===
The line remained active through World War II, including by delivering canned goods to a POW camp near McAlester's northern limit, and the U.S. Naval Ammunition Depot to the south. But PSO, being forced to divest non-utility assets, sold the railroad November 26, 1945. Given the popularity of the automobile and other changes in the postwar economy, the line shut down December 2, 1946.
