= Sans Bois County, Choctaw Nation =

Sans Bois County was a political subdivision of the Choctaw Nation of Indian Territory, prior to Oklahoma being admitted as a state. The county formed part of the Nation's Moshulatubbee District, or First District, one of three administrative super-regions.

== History ==
The county was also called Sambai Kaunti, from the French phrase sans bois, which means “without wood.” The county took its name from an important area waterway, Sans Bois Creek, which had been named by French traders or trappers in the 1700s. The Choctaws pronounced the French phrase "Sambai".

Sans Bois County did not include any towns of size. Its principal geographic features were the stream by the same name and the mountains from which it flowed, which are still known as the Sans Bois Mountains. Settlement was confined mostly to the valleys and lowlands, with farming being the major activity. Mining later became prevalent throughout the mountains, principally in the late 1800s and early 1900s.

Sans Bois County was one of the original 19 counties created by the General Council of the Choctaw Nation in 1850. The county's boundaries were established and designated according to easily recognizable natural landmarks, as were the boundaries of all Choctaw Nation counties. The county began at the mouth of Cashier Creek on the Arkansas River, up the river to the mouth of the Canadian River, and up the Canadian to the mouth of Longtown Creek. From there the boundary followed the stream to its source, and then due south to the headwaters of San Bois Creek, and from there to the headwaters of Bayouzeal. It then followed the Bayouzeal to the Sugar Loaf County boundary line. (Note: Bayouzeal is not a stream name currently in use, and the exact identity of the stream in question is unknown. Maps from the 1800s suggest it may be Brushy Creek or Brazil Creek.)

The county served as an election district for members of the National Council, and as a unit of local administration. Constitutional officers, all of whom served for two-year terms and were elected by the voters, included the county judge, sheriff, and a ranger. The judge's duties included oversight of overall county administration. The sheriff collected taxes, monitored unlawful intrusion by intruders (usually white Americans from the United States), and conducted the census. The county ranger advertised and sold strayed livestock.

== Statehood ==
As Oklahoma's statehood approached, its leading citizens, who were gathered for the Oklahoma Constitutional Convention, realized in laying out the future state's counties that, while logically designed, the Choctaw Nation's counties could not exist as economically viable political subdivisions. In most the county seat existed generally for holding county court and not as a population center. This was certainly true of sparsely populated San Bois County.

This conundrum was also recognized by the framers of the proposed State of Sequoyah, who met in 1905 to propose statehood for the Indian Territory. The Sequoyah Constitutional Convention also proposed a county structure that abolished the Choctaw counties. Sans Bois County was divided principally into the proposed Sans Bois County and Thomas County. Stigler and Bokoshe would have been Thomas County's principal towns. Quinton would have been the largest town in Sans Bois County. (Note: Map, “State of Sequoyah,” compiled by the Sequoyah Constitutional Convention, Although the map carried in Wikipedia's article on the State of Sequoyah speaks to the matter of borders, Maxwell's book offers further insight.)

Almost none of this proposition was borrowed two years later by Oklahoma's framers, who adopted a very different county structure for the region. The territory formerly comprising Sans Bois County, Choctaw Nation now falls primarily within Haskell County, with small parts now within Pittsburg, Latimer and Le Flore counties. Sans Bois County ceased to exist upon Oklahoma's statehood on November 16, 1907.
