= McAlester Scottish Rite Temple =

- U.S. National Register of Historic Places
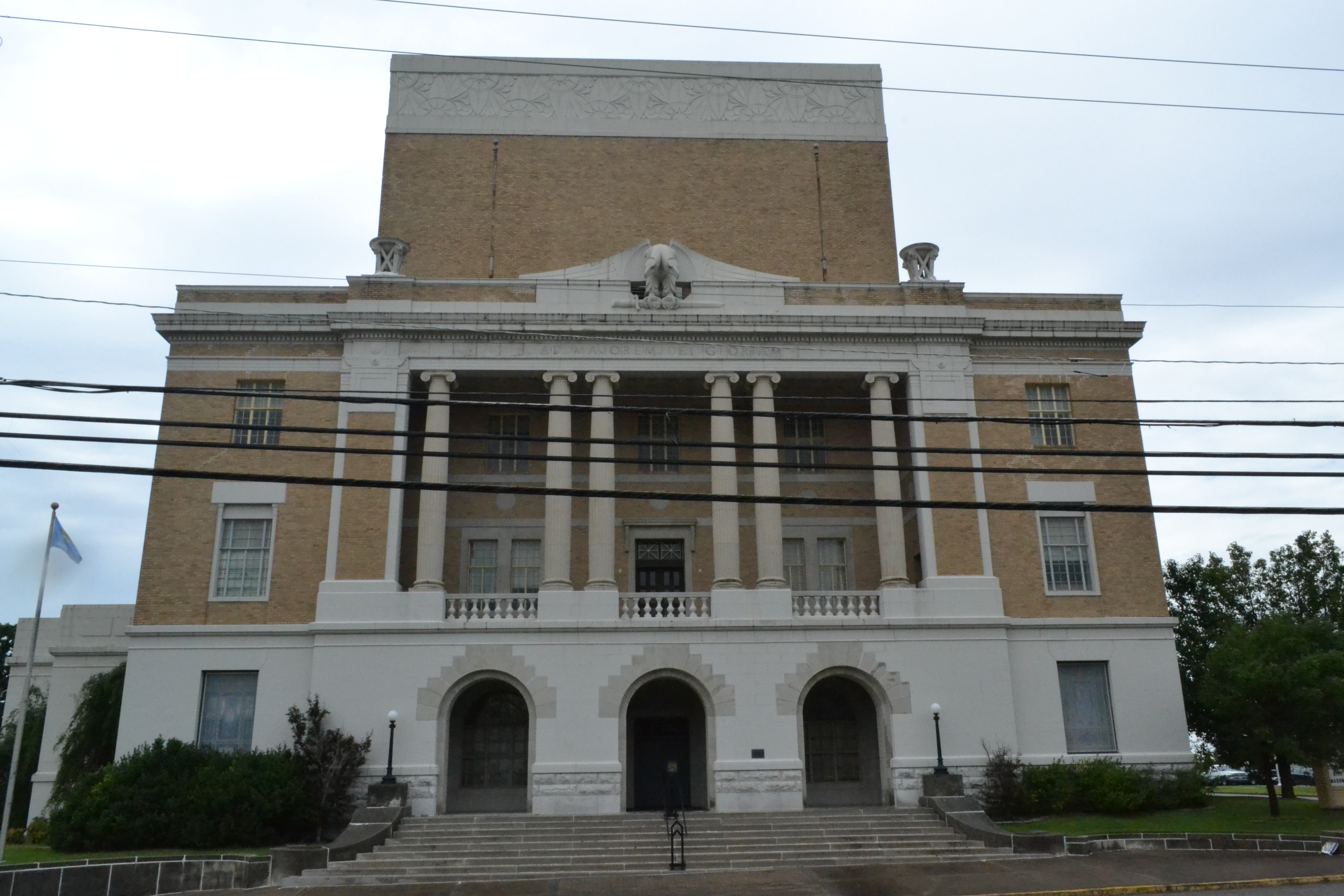

- Location within Oklahoma Location within the United States
- Location: 2nd St. and Adams Ave., McAlester, Oklahoma
- Coordinates: 34°56′5″N 95°46′00″W
- Area: 1 acre (0.40 ha)
- Built: 1907; 1928–1930
- Architect: Schmitt, William T.
- Architectural style: Art Deco, Neo-classic
- NRHP reference No.: 80004521
- Added to NRHP: November 22, 1980

The McAlester Scottish Rite Temple, also known as Masonic Temple or the McAlestor Consistory, is a building in McAlester, Oklahoma that was built in 1907 and 1928–1930. It was listed on the National Register of Historic Places in 1980.

It is the oldest Masonic building in Oklahoma.

The 1928–1930 construction yielded an "impressive" brick and stone building. It was built around a consistory that dated back to 1907.
