= Jones Academy (Oklahoma) =

Boarding school in Pittsburg County, Oklahoma

Coordinates: 34°53′4″N 95°31′5″W

Information
- Established: 1891; 135 years ago
- Grades: 1-12 (accommodation); 1-6 (education)

Jones Academy is a Native American boarding school and dormitory for students in grades 1–12 in unincorporated Pittsburg County, Oklahoma, along Oklahoma State Highway 270, near Hartsthorne. It is operated by the Choctaw Nation and is affiliated with the Bureau of Indian Education (BIE).

== History ==
It was established in 1891. In 1894, Jane Austin McCurtain was appointed superintendent. She held this role until 1895, when the Atoka Agreement transferred control of Choctaw schools to the U.S. government, which led to her dismissal along with other Choctaw administrators.

In 2006 the school proposed spending $7,162,560 to build its current 40,273-square-foot (3,741.5 m^{2}) elementary facility.

== Curriculum ==
Elementary school is provided on-site. Hartshorne Public Schools supervises the elementary academic program, and for grades 7-12 students attend Hartsthorne public schools, with Jones acting as their dormitory only. Because the institution outsources instruction for grades 7–12, the National Center for Education Statistics (NCES) counts it as a 1-6 school.
