= Carl Albert Federal Building =

Courthouse in McAlester, Oklahoma, US

Coordinates: 34°55′57″N 95°45′55″W

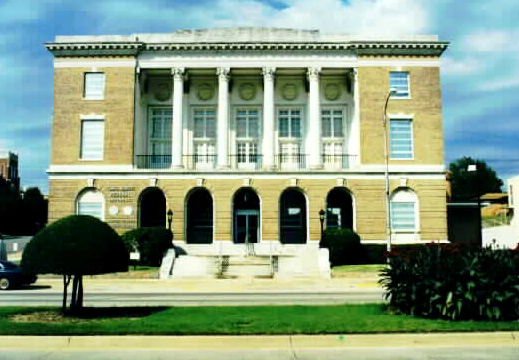
The Carl Albert Federal Building

The Carl Albert Federal Building is a historic courthouse located in McAlester, Oklahoma. Built in 1914, the facility was renamed in 1985 in honor of former Speaker of the House Carl Albert, a native of the town. It previously served the United States District Court for the Eastern District of Oklahoma. It was listed on the National Register of Historic Places in 2000.

== Significance ==
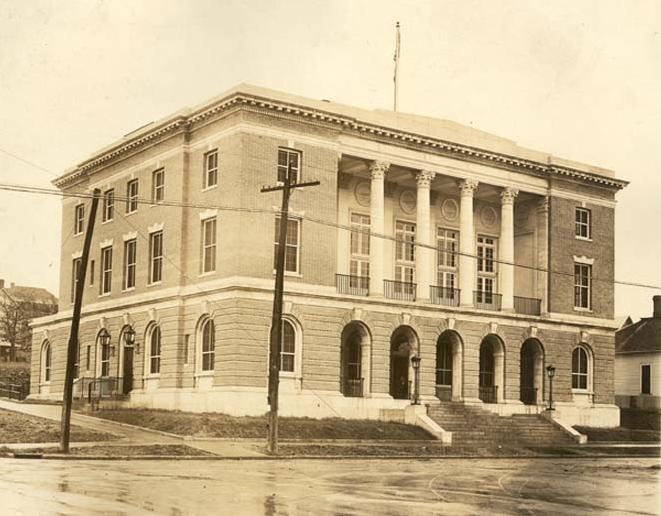
The building shortly after construction was completed.

The city of McAlester was founded in 1870. It was named for an early settler of the area, James McAlester, who set up a tent store where the heavily traveled Texas Road crossed the California Trail. Later when the railroad was established, the area began to flourish. As the area grew, so did the need for a postal facility. Built in 1914, the building served as the main Post Office for the area until the late 1960s when the Postal Service relocated.

The building was named the "Carl Albert Federal Building and Courthouse" in honor of the 46th Speaker of the U.S. House of Representatives at a formal ceremony on November 27, 1985. In 2013, the federal government ceased all court activities, and in 2016, the building was given to the city of McAlester.

== Architectural description ==
The building is an example of Neo-Classical Revival architecture. The three-story brick-clad structure rests on a brick base. The first level features rows of recessed bricks which lend a rusticated look to the building at this level. A molded limestone belt course atop the rustication separates the first floor from the second. There is also an unenriched limestone beltcourse above the third floor windows. A denticulated entablature supports a bracketed cornice. A brick parapet surmounts the building.

The first floor exhibits arched windows with bracketed keystones, elements of the Italian Renaissance style. The upper brick-clad floors exhibit the Greek orders in the use of columns and a pedimented cornice at the main elevation. This combination of elements is characteristic of the Neo-Classical style, a popular style in the early 20th-century Federal buildings.

The south elevation is the main elevation. At the center of this elevation lies a three-story recessed bay with loggias on the first and second floor levels. Five brick archways with bracketed keystones open onto the loggias at the entry. Within each archway are arched, paneled Doric pilasters. The loggia has a concrete floor and a vaulted, stucco ceiling. At the second floor level, the loggia is defined by four free-standing Corinthian columns. The columns support a pedimented entablature, and rest on the stone belt course above the first floor level. The second floor loggia also has a concrete floor with cement finish and a paneled stucco ceiling. Five French doors open onto the loggia from the second floor courtroom. The French doors are set within a molded limestone surround, ornamented by a twisted rope motif all around. The door surround also encompasses the eight pane operable transom and the two pane fixed transom over each double door. Above each door opening is a green-veined marble roundel with a molded denticulated outer ring ornamented by a series of glyphs.

All windows are replacements. They are aluminum windows with horizontal lights, the lower light being operable. First floor windows sit within arched wood frames and rest on bracketed stone sills with paneled spandrel beneath. Second floor windows are ornamented by a flat limestone lintel with keystone. Third floor windows are ornamented by limestone keystones.

The main entry to the building is on the south elevation. Original wood panel entry doors have been replaced with aluminum storefront doors. The secondary entry is to the west. Granite steps and cheek walls lead to both entries. Original cast iron light standards sit on the south elevation cheek walls. Original cast iron wall-mounted lanterns flank the west elevation entry.

The north elevation of the building originally provided the loading dock area for the Postal Service. As originally built a wooden loading dock projected from the center of the one-level east and west wings. The original wood loading dock has been enclosed and clad with bricks. A limestone parapet with unenriched entablature rests atop the bricked-in loading dock. East and west wings of the first floor enclosure appear rusticated by the use of recessed brick courses. In 1989, a three-story fire escape was built at the northeast corner of the building. The escape consists of two buff brick towers with a steel fire stair running between. Access to the stair is through fire doors at the northeast corner of the second and third floor corridors.

Significant interior spaces include the second floor courtroom; and second and third floor corridors. The courtroom retains cork tile floors at the entry and in the jury box. The original chair rail remains in the courtroom, though the ornamented ceiling was covered with acoustical tiles. The corridors appear largely original except that vinyl tile now covers the original terrazzo floors. The original wood base remains, as do a significant number of original doors.
