= Aldridge Hotel (McAlester, Oklahoma) =

- U.S. National Register of Historic Places
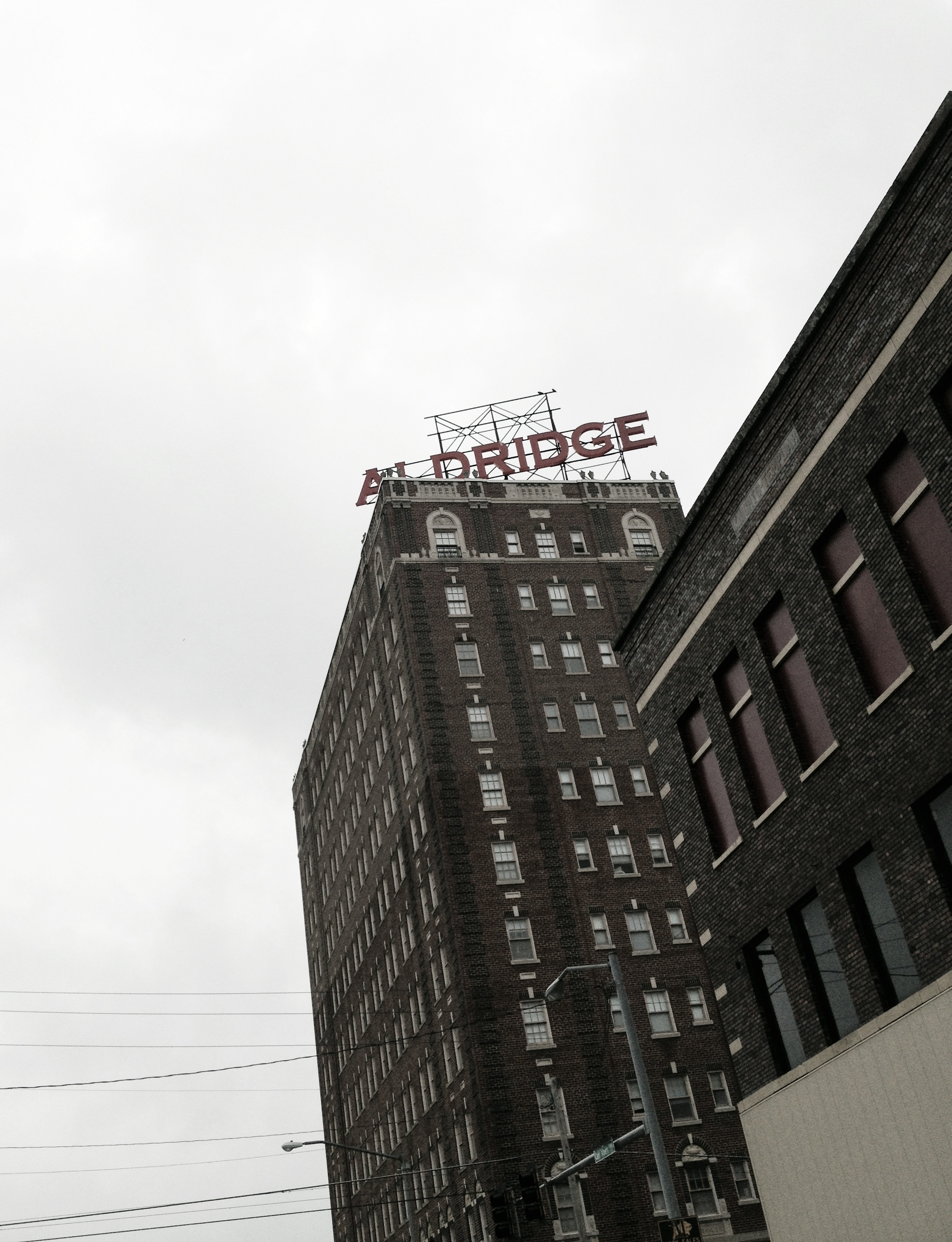
- The Aldridge Hotel in McAlester

- Location within Oklahoma Location within the United States
- Location: 200 E. Carl Albert Pkwy. (U.S. 270), McAlester, Oklahoma
- Coordinates: 34°55′56.6″N 95°46′1″W
- Built: 1929-30
- Built by: Harmon & Mattison
- Architects: Reid, Guy C.
- Architectural style: Renaissance, Sullivanesque
- NRHP reference No.: 95001408
- Added to NRHP: December 7, 1995

The Aldridge Hotel, an 11-story hotel on U.S. 270 in McAlester, Oklahoma completed in 1930. It was listed on the National Register of Historic Places in 1995 and is today used as senior citizen housing.

It is an 11-story brick-veneered concrete building built during 1929–30, designed in a "generally Sullivanesque" style by architect Guy C. Reid. According to its NRHP nomination, "It is an excellent example of the large commercial hotel designed to play a prominent role in the economic and social life of southeastern Oklahoma."
