= Hartshorne Public Schools =

School district in Oklahoma, U.S.

Hartshorne Public Schools is a school district headquartered in Hartshorne, Oklahoma. It includes an elementary school and a middle-high school.

It serves Hartsthorne, Adamson, and a portion of Haileyville.

Boarders in grades 7–12 at Jones Academy, a Native American boarding school, are educated by Hartsthorne school district.

== History ==
Mark Ichord served as superintendent until his retirement in 2017. Jason Lindley replaced him.

In March 2020 Lindley suspended spring activities and criticized the state government's handling of the COVID-19 pandemic in Oklahoma.
