= McAlester News-Capital =

- Type: Daily newspaper
- Format: Broadsheet
- Owner: CNHI
- Publisher: Amy Johns
- Editor: Glenn Puit
- Founded: 1896
- Headquarters: 500 South Second Street; McAlester, Oklahoma 74501; United States
- Circulation: 9,958 Daily (as of 2007)
- ISSN: 1088-4386
- OCLC number: 23715678
- Website: mcalesternews.com

The McAlester News-Capital (formerly the News-Capital & Democrat) is a daily newspaper published in McAlester, Oklahoma, United States, covering Southeastern Oklahoma. It is owned by CNHI.

Journalists James Beaty, Kevin Harvison, MJ Brickey and Matt Goisman anchor the editorial staff. Its editor, Glenn Puit, has written five true crime novels. The paper is published Tuesday through Friday and on Sunday. It was founded by Lowell and Lucille Turner, who published and edited it for many years. Their son, Fred Turner then published and edited.
