= Hartshorne, Oklahoma =

- City
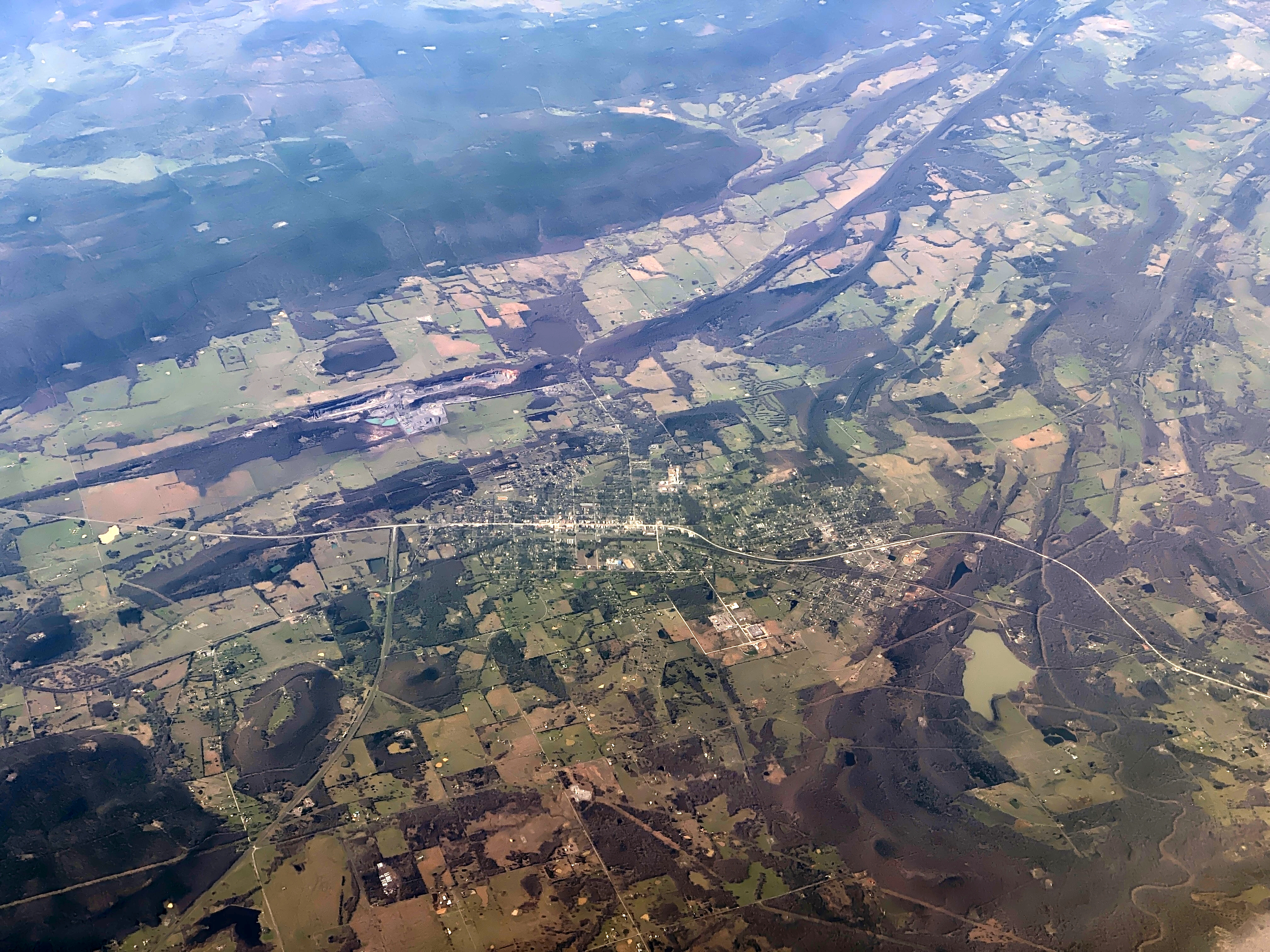
- Aerial view of Hartshorne

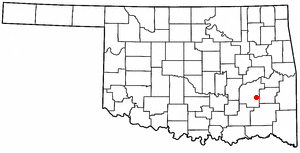
- Location of Hartshorne, Oklahoma
- Coordinates: 34°50′22″N 95°33′34″W
- Country: United States
- State: Oklahoma
- County: Pittsburg

Area
  - Total: 3.39 sq mi (8.79 km^{2})
  - Land: 3.25 sq mi (8.42 km^{2})
  - Water: 0.14 sq mi (0.36 km^{2})
- Elevation: 692 ft (211 m)

Population (2020)
  - Total: 1,947
  - Density: 598.6/sq mi (231.12/km^{2})
- Time zone: UTC-6 (Central (CST))
  - Summer (DST): UTC-5 (CDT)
- ZIP code: 74547
- Area codes: 539/918
- FIPS code: 40-32850
- GNIS feature ID: 2410711
- Website: www.cityofhartshorne.com

Hartshorne (pronounced "Hearts-orn") is a city in Pittsburg County, Oklahoma, United States. It is the third largest city in the county. The population was 1,947 at the time of the 2020 United States census.

== Description ==
The community was named for Dr. Charles Hartshorne, a wealthy investor from Philadelphia, Pennsylvania, who was attracted by the potential profits offered by coal deposits in the area.

== History ==
The present-day city of Hartshorne began as a coal mining community about 1850. Coal mine operators in the Indian Territory recruited European immigrants to work the mines. The first workers were probably English and Irish, but other ethnic groups soon joined them. These included Italians and eastern Europeans. Like many other such communities, this was a company town, built very close to the mine, with rudimentary houses and a company store.

A post office opened at Hartshorne, Indian Territory on March 5, 1850. It was named for Dr. Charles Hartshorne, a railroad official. Jones Academy was established southwest of Hartshorne in 1881. At the time of its founding, Hartshorne was located in Gaines County, a part of the Moshulatubbee District of the Choctaw Nation.

The Choctaw Coal and Railway (CC&R) line, acquired by the town, was incorporated in 1887 and began building a 67 miles (108 km) line between Wister and South McAlester. In 1894, the CC&R was reorganized and renamed the Choctaw, Oklahoma and Gulf Railroad (CO&G). The Wister - South McAlester line was completed in 1900, and also linked to Wilburton, Alderson and Hartshorne. In 1902, the Chicago, Rock Island and Pacific Railway gained control of the CO&G.

The community incorporated in Tobucksy County of the Choctaw Nation by order of the U.S. District Court, Central District, Indian Territory, on March 1, 1900. Hartshorne became part of Pittsburg County at statehood on November 16, 1907.

Hartshorne was also linked to Haileyville, Bache, Alderson, Krebs, and McAlester by the Pittsburg County Railway interurban from 1903 to 1946.

The Holy Rosary Church, complete with a rectory, a convent, and a parochial school, was built in 1895 by Russian and other Eastern European immigrants. Other churches constructed before the 20th Century were: Baptist, Methodist, Christian, Presbyterian, and Episcopal. The Saints Cyril and Methodius Russian Orthodox Greek Catholic Church remains a town landmark and is included on the National Register of Historic Places listings in Pittsburg County, Oklahoma. Completed in 1916, it replaced an earlier 1897 version that immigrants from Russia and other eastern European countries constructed.

The Saints Cyril and Methodius church had been owned by the Sts. Cyril Methodius Orthodox Church, Inc. (Note: Identified in court as a non-profit Oklahoma corporation.) On March 20, 2016, a man named Bill Melancon filed a quitclaim deed in the Pittsburg County Clerk's office, transferring ownership of the property to Melancon. The quitclaim deed had been signed by Bill O'Nesky, a church member, who Melancon claimed was a church trustee. Melanin also presented a Special Warranty Deed dated in 2010, by Bill O’Nesky, Tanya O’Nesky, and Foy Ledbetter, identified as successor trustees of the church. A group of church members first learned about the alleged sale soon afterward, when they found strangers on and inside the property. They filed suit in District Court. The case came before Judge James Bland in April 2016. (Note: By this time, Bill O'Nesky, then about 90 years old, had died.) Judge Bland issued a restraining order to bar Melancon, his agents and representatives from coming on or within 100 yards (91 m) of the property, or removing anything or making any changes before Bland revisited the case in June 2010. An out of court settlement between the church members before the date set by the judge resulted in the dismissal of the case, and a deed signed by Melanin transferring ownership back to the church.

== Geography ==
According to the United States Census Bureau, the city has a total area of 3.6 square miles (9.3 km^{2}), of which 3.5 square miles (9.1 km^{2}) is land and 0.1 square miles (0.26 km^{2}), or 3.60%, is water.

The city is located approximately 15 miles (24 km) east of McAlester on U.S. Highway 270.

== Demographics ==
Historical population
Census	Pop.	Note	%±
1900	2,352		—
1910	2,963		26.0%
1920	3,480		17.4%
1930	3,587		3.1%
1940	2,596		−27.6%
1950	2,330		−10.2%
1960	1,903		−18.3%
1970	2,121		11.5%
1980	2,380		12.2%
1990	2,120		−10.9%
2000	2,102		−0.8%
2010	2,125		1.1%
2020	1,947		−8.4%
U.S. Decennial Census

=== 2020 census ===
As of the 2020 census, Hartshorne had a population of 1,947 and the median age was 41.0 years. 22.9% of residents were under the age of 18 and 20.7% of residents were 65 years of age or older. For every 100 females there were 96.5 males, and for every 100 females age 18 and over there were 91.8 males age 18 and over.

0% of residents lived in urban areas, while 100.0% lived in rural areas.

There were 814 households in Hartshorne, of which 29.6% had children under the age of 18 living in them. Of all households, 38.6% were married-couple households, 21.9% were households with a male householder and no spouse or partner present, and 31.8% were households with a female householder and no spouse or partner present. About 34.4% of all households were made up of individuals and 15.9% had someone living alone who was 65 years of age or older.

There were 968 housing units, of which 15.9% were vacant. Among occupied housing units, 66.1% were owner-occupied and 33.9% were renter-occupied. The homeowner vacancy rate was 1.7% and the rental vacancy rate was 8.2%.

Racial composition as of the 2020 census
Race	Percent
White	63.6%
Black or African American	1.5%
American Indian and Alaska Native	20.9%
Asian	0.2%
Native Hawaiian and Other Pacific Islander	0%
Some other race	0.8%
Two or more races	13.0%
Hispanic or Latino (of any race)	2.4%

=== 2010 census ===
As of the 2010 census, there were 2,125 people, 850 households, and 551 families residing in the city. The population density was 614.5 inhabitants per square mile (237.3/km^{2}). There were 991 housing units at an average density of 291.6 per square mile (112.6/km^{2}). The racial makeup of the city was 65.9% White, 2.5% African American, 20.3% Native American, 0.20% Asian, 0.10% Pacific Islander, 1.1% from other races, and 9.7% from two or more races. Hispanic or Latino of any race were 3.6% of the population.

There were 850 households, out of which 35.8% had children under the age of 18 living with them, 43.4% were married couples living together, 14.6% had a female householder with no husband present, and 35.2% were non-families. 31.0% of all households were made up of individuals, and 35.8% had someone living alone who was 65 years of age or older. The average household size was 2.47 and the average family size was 3.06.

In the city, the population was spread out, with 34.3% under the age of 18, 8.0% from 18 to 24, 23.7% from 25 to 44, 23.6% from 45 to 64, and 19.5% who were 65 years of age or older. The median age was 37.7 years. For every 100 females, there were 89.2 males. For every 100 females age 18 and over, there were 83.7 males.

The median income for a household in the city was $21,078, and the median income for a family was $26,650. Males had a median income of $25,705 versus $18,603 for females. The per capita income for the city was $13,179. About 18.6% of families and 26.3% of the population were below the poverty line, including 33.0% of those under age 18 and 17.5% of those age 65 or over.

== Education ==
The Hartshorne Public Schools system operates an elementary school, a junior high, and a high school. The city also has four head-start centers.

2 miles (3.2 km) northeast of Hartshorne is Jones Academy, a public boarding school for Native Americans with proof of their tribal heritage. Many tribal students come from the Choctaw Nation, whose territory encompasses Pittsburg County. The junior high/high school students attend the Hartshorne Public Schools, while Jones Academy has its own elementary.

Hartshorne Public Library is located in downtown Hartshorne.

== Government ==
The mayor of Hartshorne announced her retirement and resigned her position abruptly on September 27, 2016. Trueblood's departure was reported by the McAlester News-Capital, which had no further information. The same article said that the FBI was investigating the possible misuse of city funds for personal purchases, and that several credit card statements bore the name of the former City Clerk, who had either been suspended or resigned.

The previous mayor had resigned his position after serving less than five months of his four-year term, citing personal reasons.

== Notable people ==
- Ed Jeffers, former professional football player
- Richard Lerblance, Oklahoma state senator
- Warren Spahn, Hall of Fame baseball player
- Anna Wallis Suh, the original voice of "Seoul City Sue" during the Korean War

== See also ==
- List of cities and towns in Oklahoma
