= McAlester Public Schools =

School district in Oklahoma

The McAlester Public School District is a school district that competes and is classified as a 5A school district in McAlester, Oklahoma, United States.

It serves the majority of McAlester, though parts of McAlester are in other school districts.

McAlester High School graduated its first class in 1903. Ryan Walters taught history at the school according to his biographical statement.
