= McAlester, Oklahoma =

- City
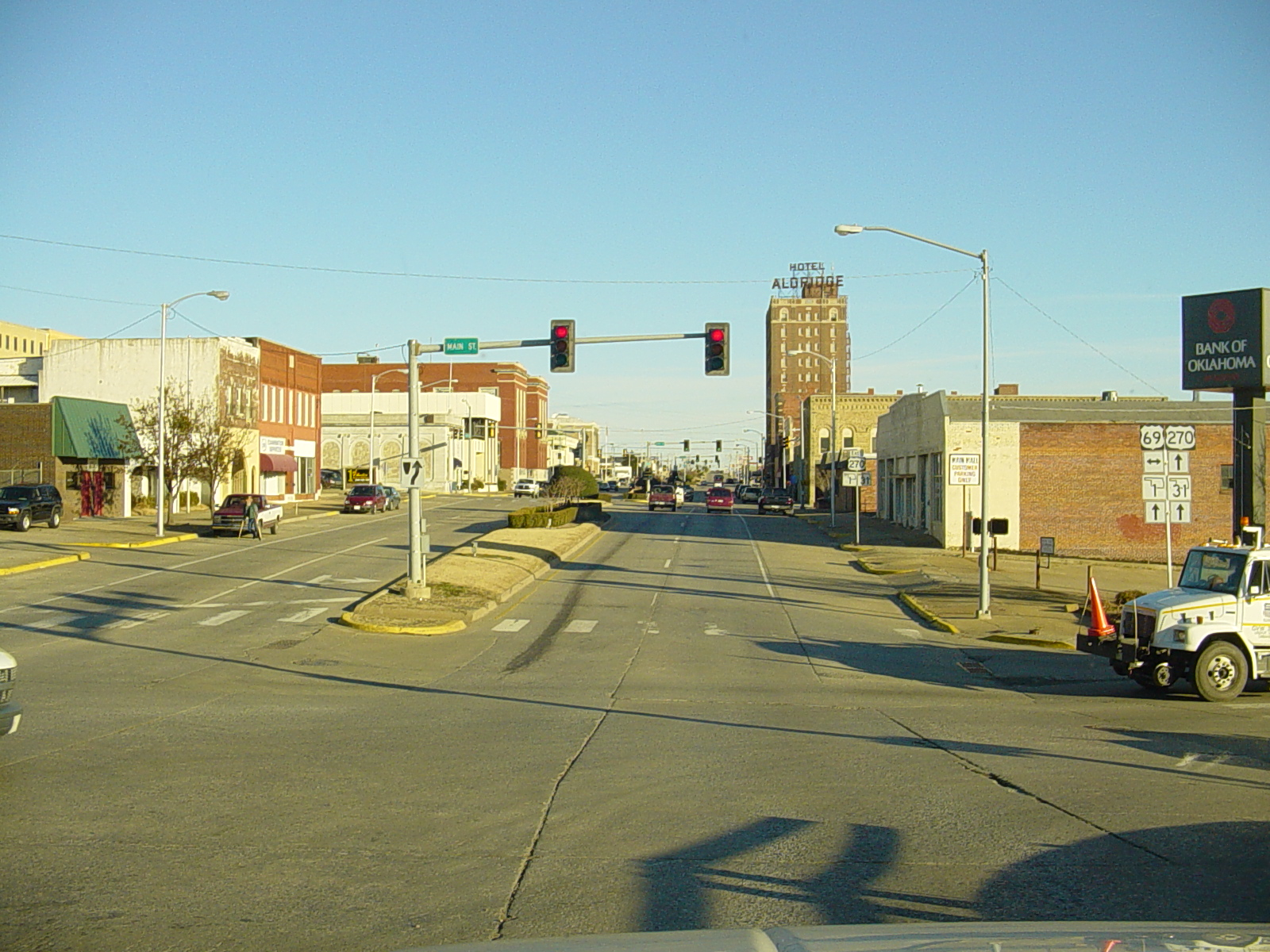
- Downtown McAlester in January 2008
- Nickname: Mactown
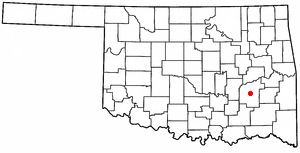
- Location of McAlester, Oklahoma

- Location in the U.S. state of Oklahoma Location in the United States
- Coordinates: 34°55′32″N 95°46′24″W
- Country: United States
- State: Oklahoma
- County: Pittsburg
- Named for: J. J. McAlester

Government
  - Mayor: Justin Few

Area
  - Total: 17.93 sq mi (46.43 km^{2})
  - Land: 17.80 sq mi (46.10 km^{2})
  - Water: 0.13 sq mi (0.33 km^{2})
- Elevation: 742 ft (226 m)

Population (2020)
  - Total: 18,171
  - Density: 1,020.9/sq mi (394.16/km^{2})
- Time zone: UTC-6 (Central (CST))
  - Summer (DST): UTC-5 (CDT)
- ZIP Codes: 74501–74502
- Area codes: 539/918
- FIPS code: 40-44800
- GNIS feature ID: 2411056
- Website: www.cityofmcalester.com

McAlester is a city in and the county seat of Pittsburg County, Oklahoma. As of the 2020 census, McAlester had a population of 18,171. The town gets its name from James Jackson "J. J." McAlester, an early settler and businessman who later became lieutenant governor of Oklahoma. McAlester married Rebecca Burney, the daughter of a full-blood Chickasaw family, which made him a citizen of the Chickasaw Nation.

McAlester is the home of the Oklahoma State Penitentiary, the former site of an "inside the walls" prison rodeo that ESPN's SportsCenter once broadcast. The prison's nickname, Big Mac, was derived from its location in the town.

McAlester is home to many of the employees of the McAlester Army Ammunition Plant. This facility makes the majority of the bombs used by the United States military. In 1998 McAlester became the home of the Defense Ammunition Center (DAC), which moved from Savanna, Illinois, to McAlester Army Ammunition Plant.

== History ==
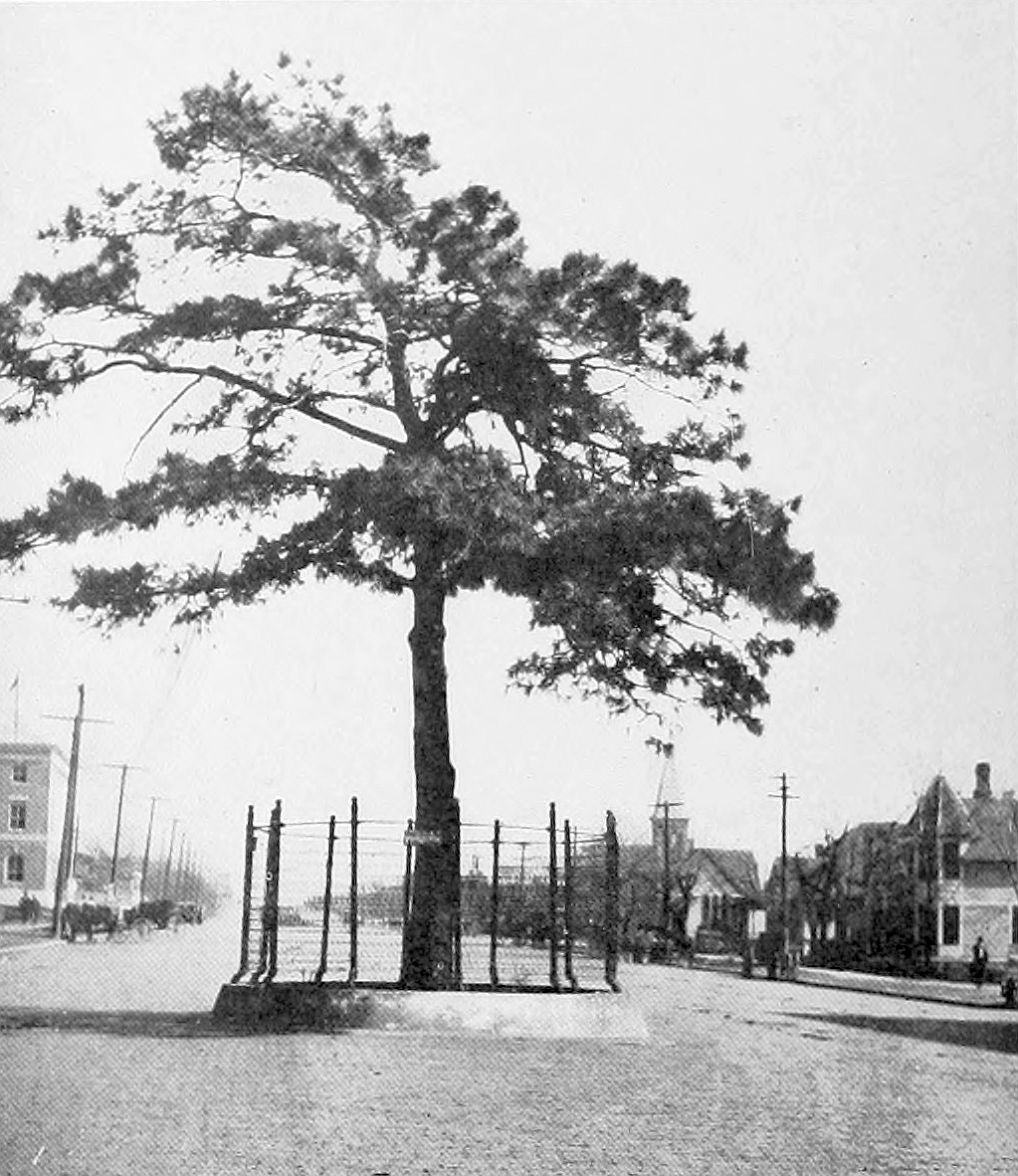
When this street in McAlester was paved in 1916, the city saved this pine tree and built a fence around it

The crossing of the east–west California Road with the north–south Texas Road formed a natural point of settlement. At the time of its founding, the site was located in Tobucksy County, a part of the Moshulatubbee District of the Choctaw Nation. Alyssia Young, who emigrated from Mississippi to the Indian Territory, first established a settlement at the intersection of the two roads in 1838. The town was named Perryville after James Perry, member of a Choctaw family, who established a trading post. At one time Perryville was the capital of the Choctaw Nation and County Seat of Tobucksy County. During the American Civil War, the Choctaw allied with the Confederate States of America (CSA) as the war reached Indian Territory.

A depot providing supplies to Confederate Forces in Indian Territory was set up at Perryville. On August 26, 1863, a force of 4,500 Union soldiers crossed the Canadian River and destroyed the Confederate munitions depot at Perryville. This became known as the Battle of Perryville, Indian Territory. Union Major General James G. Blunt, finding the Confederate supplies and realizing that Perryville was a major supply depot for Confederate forces, ordered the town burned. The town was rebuilt but never reached its prewar glory or population.

After the end of the Civil War in 1865, Captain J. J. McAlester obtained a job with the trading company of Reynolds and Hannaford. McAlester convinced the firm to locate a general store at Tupelo in the Choctaw Nation. He had learned of coal deposits in Indian Territory during the war while serving as a captain with the 22nd Arkansas Infantry Regiment (Confederate). At Fort Smith, Arkansas, before going to work with Reynolds and Hannaford, McAlester had received maps of the coal deposits from engineer Oliver Weldon, who served with McAlester during the war.

Weldon had worked for the U.S. surveying Indian Territory before the war and knew of the coal deposits. Hearing of the railroad plans to extend through Indian Territory and knowing that rich deposits of coal were in an area north of the town of Perryville, McAlester convinced Reynolds and Hannaford that Bucklucksy would be a more suitable and profitable site for the trading post. (Note: Bucklucksy was an unincorporated community north of McAlester until part of it was submerged by the creation of Lake Eufaula.) He constructed a trading post/general store there in late 1869. The Bucklucksy general store was an immediate success, but McAlester recognized an even greater opportunity in the abundance of coal deposits in the area, so he began obtaining rights to the deposits from the Choctaws, anticipating the impending construction of a rail line through Indian Territory.

As the first railroad to extend its line to the northern border of Indian Territory, the Union Pacific Railway Southern Branch earned right of way and a liberal bonus of land to extend the line to Texas. Several New York businessmen, including Levi P. Morton, Levi Parsons, August Belmont, J. Pierpont Morgan, George Denison and John D. Rockefeller, were interested in extending rail through Indian Territory, and the Missouri-Kansas-Texas Railroad, familiarly called the Katy Railroad, began its corporate existence in 1865 toward that end. Morton and Parsons selected a site near the Kansas Indian Territory border where they incorporated the settlement of Parsons, Kansas in 1871.

That same year, J. J. McAlester, after buying out Reynolds's share of the trading post, journeyed with a sample of coal to the railroad town in hopes of persuading officials to locate the line near his store at Bucklucksy. The trading post's location on the Texas Road weighed in its favor, given that the Katy line construction roughly followed the Shawnee Trail – Texas Road route south to the Red River. The line reached Bucklucksy in 1872, and Katy Railroad officials named the railway stop McAlester (Nesbitt 1933, pp. 760–61).

With the coming of the railroad, businesses in nearby Perryville began relocating to be near the McAlester Rail Depot, marking the end of Perryville and the beginning of McAlester. On August 22, 1872, J. J. McAlester married Rebecca Burney (1841–1919). She was a member of the Chickasaw Nation, which made it possible for McAlester to gain citizenship and the right to own property (including mineral rights to the coal deposits in both the Choctaw and Chickasaw nations). McAlester quickly obtained land near the intersection of the north–south and east–west rail lines, where he opened a second general store and continued selling coal to the railroads.

In 1885, Fritz Sittle (Sittel), a Choctaw citizen by marriage and one of the first settlers in the area, urged visiting newspaperman Edwin D. Chadick to pursue the possibility of an east–west rail line to run through the coal mining district at Krebs that would connect with the north–south line at McAlester. Chadick eventually found financing and established the Choctaw Coal and Railway in 1888, but was unable to come to terms with J. J. McAlester over the issue of right of way.

In the 1870s, miners from Pennsylvania arrived in McAlester to work in the coal mines. Miners of Italian origin arrived in McAlester in 1874.

Chadick and his investors purchased land to the south of McAlester's General Store, and a natural trading crossroads formed where the two rail lines crossed, quickly becoming a bustling community called South McAlester. (Note: South McAlester was about 1.5 miles (2.4 km) south of the original town, which became known familiarly as North McAlester or North Town, although early U.S. Census records simply identified it as McAlester.) South McAlester grew much more rapidly than North McAlester. The 1900 census showed a population of 3,470 for the former and 642 for the latter.

The two towns operated as somewhat separate communities until 1907, when the United States Congress passed an act joining them as a single municipality, the action being required since the towns were under federal jurisdiction in Indian Territory. McAlester and South McAlester were combined under the single name McAlester, with South McAlester officeholders as officials of the single town. Designation as a single community by the United States Post Office came on July 1, 1907, nearly five months before Oklahoma statehood, which caused a redrawing of county lines and designations such that the majority of Tobucksy County fell within the new lines of Pittsburg County. The city had 8,144 inhabitants upon statehood, more than a fourth of whom were foreign-born.

McAlester was linked to Krebs, Alderson, Bache, Haileyville, and Hartshorne by the Pittsburg County Railway interurban from 1903 to 1946. McAlester was also on the route of the Jefferson Highway established in 1915, with that road running more than 2,300 miles from Winnipeg, Manitoba to New Orleans, Louisiana.

McAlester was the site of the 2004 trial of Terry Nichols on Oklahoma state charges related to the 1995 Oklahoma City bombing. On December 25, 2000, an ice storm hit the area, leaving residents without electrical service and water for more than two weeks; in January 2007, another devastating ice storm crippled the city, leaving residents without power and water for more than a week.

== Geography ==
McAlester is at the intersection of U.S. Route 69 and U.S. Route 270, in Pittsburg County. According to the United States Census Bureau, the city has a total area of 41 square miles (110 km^{2}), of which 40.6 square miles (105 km^{2}) is land. It has a humid subtropical climate (Cfa) and average monthly temperatures range from 40.0 °F (4.4 °C) in January to 81.7 °F (27.6 °C) in July. The hardiness zone is 7b.

== Demographics ==
Historical population
| Census | Pop. | Note | %± |
|---|---|---|---|
| 1900 | 646 | | — |
| 1910 | 11,774 | | 1,722.6% |
| 1920 | 10,632 | | −9.7% |
| 1930 | 11,804 | | 11.0% |
| 1940 | 12,401 | | 5.1% |
| 1950 | 17,878 | | 44.2% |
| 1960 | 17,419 | | −2.6% |
| 1970 | 18,802 | | 7.9% |
| 1980 | 17,255 | | −8.2% |
| 1990 | 16,370 | | −5.1% |
| 2000 | 17,783 | | 8.6% |
| 2010 | 18,383 | | 3.4% |
| 2020 | 18,171 | | −1.2% |

=== 2020 census ===
As of the 2020 census, McAlester had a population of 18,171. The median age was 37.3 years, with 23.0% of residents under the age of 18 and 16.6% aged 65 or older.

For every 100 females there were 106.8 males, and for every 100 females age 18 and over there were 108.1 males age 18 and over.

94.7% of residents lived in urban areas, while 5.3% lived in rural areas.

There were 6,897 households in McAlester, of which 31.1% had children under the age of 18 living in them. Of all households, 38.6% were married-couple households, 19.6% were households with a male householder and no spouse or partner present, and 34.3% were households with a female householder and no spouse or partner present. About 33.9% of all households were made up of individuals and 14.8% had someone living alone who was 65 years of age or older.

There were 7,962 housing units, of which 13.4% were vacant. Among occupied housing units, 59.3% were owner-occupied and 40.7% were renter-occupied. The homeowner vacancy rate was 2.6% and the rental vacancy rate was 12.2%.

Racial composition as of the 2020 census
| Race | Percent |
|---|---|
| White | 62.5% |
| Black or African American | 5.8% |
| American Indian and Alaska Native | 13.7% |
| Asian | 0.9% |
| Native Hawaiian and Other Pacific Islander | 0.1% |
| Some other race | 3.6% |
| Two or more races | 13.5% |
| Hispanic or Latino (of any race) | 7.8% |

=== 2000 census ===
As of the 2000 census, there were 17,783 people, 6,584 households, and 4,187 families residing in the city. The population density was 1,133.1 inhabitants per square mile (437.5/km^{2}). There were 7,374 housing units at an average density of 469.9 per square mile (181.4/km^{2}).

The racial makeup of the city was 74.72% White, 8.68% African American, 10.48% Native American, 0.39% Asian, 0.05% Pacific Islander, 1.29% from other races, and 4.38% from two or more races. Hispanic or Latino of any race were 3.04% of the population.

There were 6,584 households, out of which 29.1% had children under the age of 18 living with them, 46.6% were married couples living together, 13.7% had a female householder with no husband present, and 36.4% were non-families. 33.7% of all households were made up of individuals, and 16.6% had someone living alone who was 65 years of age or older. The average household size was 2.31 and the average family size was 2.93.

In the city, the population was spread out, with 22.2% under the age of 18, 8.7% from 18 to 24, 30.4% from 25 to 44, 20.8% from 45 to 64, and 18.0% who were 65 years of age or older. The median age was 38 years. For every 100 females, there were 107.8 males. For every 100 females age 18 and over, there were 108.2 males.

The median income for a household in the city was $28,631, and the median income for a family was $36,480. Males had a median income of $29,502 versus $19,455 for females. The per capita income for the city was $16,694. About 16.1% of families and 19.4% of the population were below the poverty line, including 26.8% of those under age 18 and 11.6% of those age 65 or over.

== Economy ==
Agriculture and coal mining supported the city's economy around the turn of the 20th century. Cotton was the main cash crop, and McAlester had three cotton gins and one cotton compress. Then a boll weevil infestation destroyed local cotton production. Meanwhile, railroads converted from coal to oil as their primary fuel, which marked the decline of the coal industry in the area.

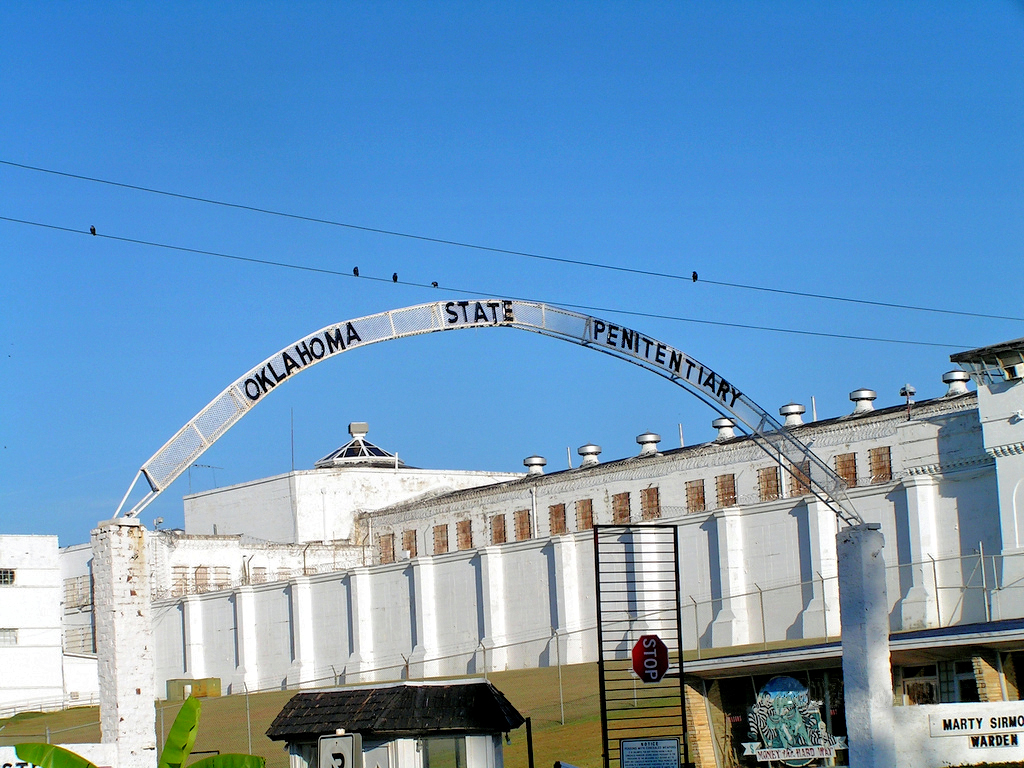
Oklahoma State Penitentiary, established in 1911, is a source of employment and local revenue in McAlester

The Oklahoma State Penitentiary is a major source of employment and revenue in McAlester.

During World War II, the U.S. Government built the Naval Ammunition Plant a few miles south of McAlester. In 1977, the facility became the U.S. Army Ammunition Plant. It is still the main site of ammunition production and storage for the armed forces in the United States.

== Government ==
Two Oklahoma Department of Corrections facilities, the Oklahoma State Penitentiary and the Jackie Brannon Correctional Center, are in McAlester. McAlester was also previously home to the United States District Court for the Eastern District of Oklahoma in the Carl Albert Federal Building.

== Organizations ==
Another non-profit called McAlester Main Street, one of the various national Main Street Programs, is a public-private partnership with the City of McAlester, the Oklahoma Department of Commerce, and the National Trust for Historic Preservation, which works to preserve and revitalize Old Town and Downtown McAlester.

== Education ==
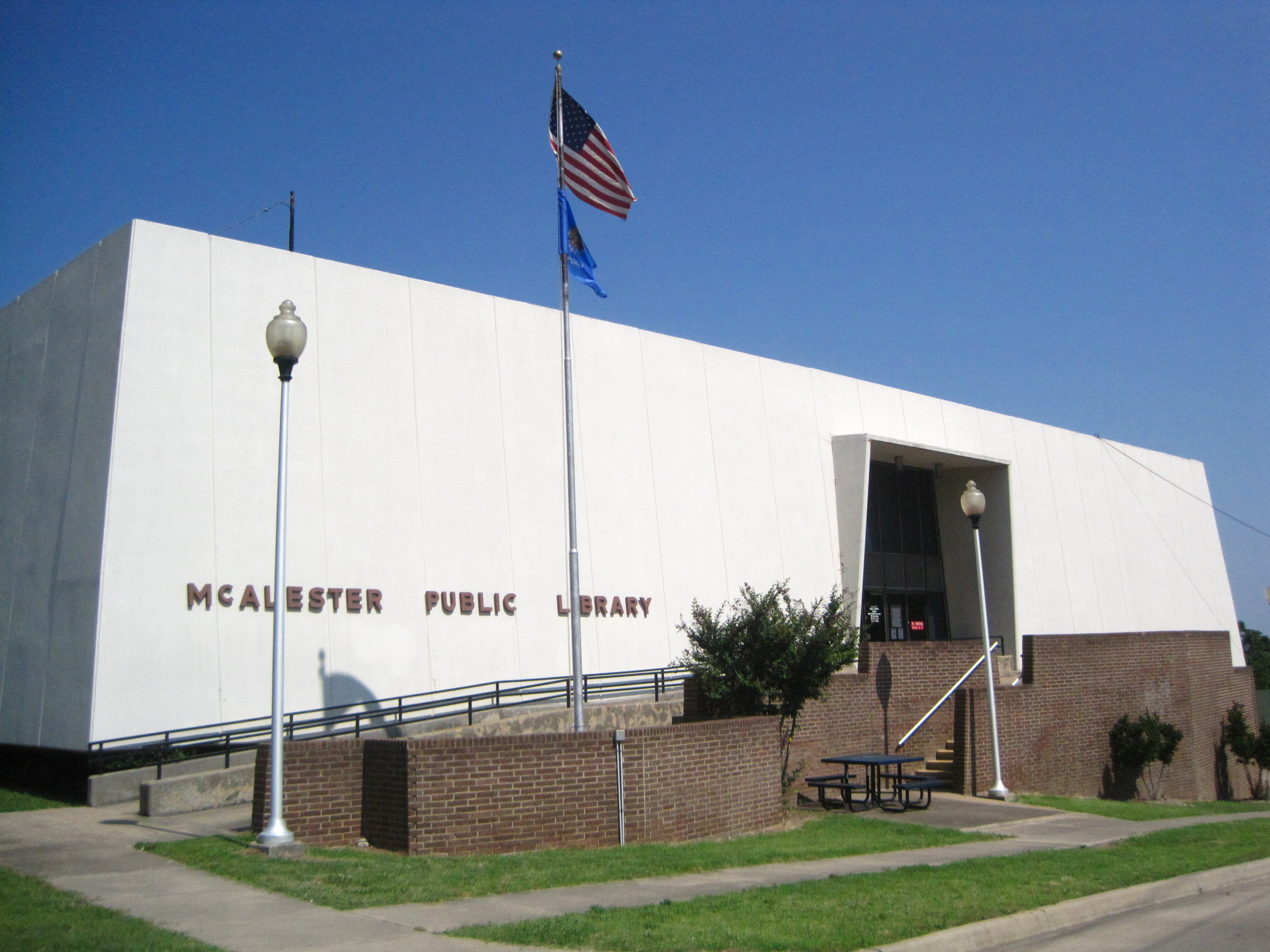
McAlester Public Library

McAlester Public Schools operates public schools. The McAlester Public Library was built in 1970. As of 2010 the city has plans to build a new library. The Friends of the McAlester Public Library is financing the new branch.

McAlester includes Kiamichi Technology Center, which has over 300 students per school year. There is also an extension of Eastern Oklahoma State College that partners with Southeastern Oklahoma State University and East Central University. The Wanda Bass Higher Education Center, a branch of Eastern Oklahoma State College, is also in McAlester.

== Media ==
=== Newspaper ===
- McAlester News-Capital

== Transportation ==
McAlester is served by:

- Arkansas and Oklahoma Railroad
- Indian Nation Turnpike
- Interstate 40
- Greyhound Lines
- McAlester Regional Airport
- State Highway 1
- State Highway 9
- State Highway 31
- State Highway 71
- U.S. Highway 69 Business
- U.S. Highway 69
- U.S. Highway 75
- U.S. Highway 270
- U.S. Highway 271

McAlester Regional Airport (KMLC; FAA ID: MLC), approximately three miles southwest of town, features a paved 5602’ x 100’ runway. The airport had commercial air service through Central Airlines in the 1960s.

== Points of interest ==
- Garrard Ardeneum
- McAlester Public Schools
- McAlester News-Capital
- Oklahoma State Penitentiary

== Notable people ==
- Carl Albert, speaker of the U.S. House of Representatives
- Melva Blancett, actress
- John Berryman, poet
- Mary Blair, artist, Disney animator
- Ridge Bond, actor/singer
- Riley Brett, race car driver
- Quentin Brooks, Olympian athlete
- Edwin H. Burba, Jr., U.S. Army four-star general
- Lynn Cartwright, actress
- Wilburn Cartwright, U.S. representative from Oklahoma
- W.H.H. Clayton, U.S. District Court judge
- Bennie L. Davis, U.S. Air Force four-star general
- Bob Dickson, professional golfer
- Lance Fenton, racing driver
- Clonie Gowen, professional poker player
- Micha Hancock, indoor volleyball player
- Jerry Jewell, voice actor affiliated with Funimation
- Levi Parham, singer-songwriter
- Steve King, NFL football player
- Steven T. Kuykendall, U.S. representative from California
- Pepper Martin, Major League Baseball player
- Dave Matthews, saxophonist
- J. J. McAlester, pioneer for whom McAlester was named
- Pake McEntire, singer
- Reba McEntire, singer/actress
- Susie McEntire-Eaton, singer
- Beverlee McKinsey, actress
- George Nigh (b. 1927), politician, Governor of Oklahoma (1979 - 1987), was born in McAlester
- William Nigh, politician
- Rutus Sarlls, first lawyer in South McAlester, political candidate, and successful defendant in a United States Supreme Court case involving the sale of malt beverages to Native Americans.
- Derek Sitter, founder/former owner, Volcanic Theatre Pub (Bend, Oregon) and actor/filmmaker
- Gene Stipe, longest-serving member of the Oklahoma Senate, represented McAlester (1957–2003)
- Steven W. Taylor (b. 1949), attended high school in McAlester, mayor of McAlester (1982 - 1984), Oklahoma Supreme Court Justice (2004 - 2016), Oklahoma Supreme Court Chief Justice (2011 - 2013)
- Edward Lloyd Thomas, Confederate general
- Wade Watts, Baptist minister; civil rights activist
- Walter L. Weaver, U.S. representative from Ohio
- Michael Wilson, screenwriter

== NRHP sites ==
The following sites in McAlester are listed on the National Register of Historic Places listings in Pittsburg County, Oklahoma:

- Aldridge Hotel
- Busby Office Building
- Busby Theatre (demolished in 1983)
- Federal Building and US Courthouse
- First Presbyterian Church
- International Temple, Supreme Assembly, Order of the Rainbow for Girls
- Jeff Lee Park Bath House and Pool
- L’Ouverture Gymnasium (junction of S. 14th St. and E Chickasaw Ave.)
- Mass Grave of the Mexican Miners
- McAlester Armory
- McAlester Downtown Historic District (bounded by Business 69, E. Carl Albert Pkwy., N. 5th St. & RR tracks)
- McAlester DX
- McAlester House
- McAlester Scottish Rite Temple
- Mine Rescue Station Building
- OKLA Theater
- Perryville
- Pittsburg County Courthouse
- Warden's House (Penitentiary Boulevard and West St.)

== Bibliography ==
- Nesbitt, Paul (1933), "J.J. McAlester", Chronicles of Oklahoma, vol. 11, no. 2, Oklahoma City: Oklahoma Historical Society (published June 1933), pp. 758–64, ISSN 0009-6024, OCLC 1554537, archived from the original on July 6, 2008.
- McAlester Chamber of Commerce (September 1, 2007), Living In McAlester: Location/ Transportation
- Dunbar, Trevor (January 14, 2007). "Ice storm". McAlester News-Capital.
