= Moshulatubbee District =

Moshulatubbee
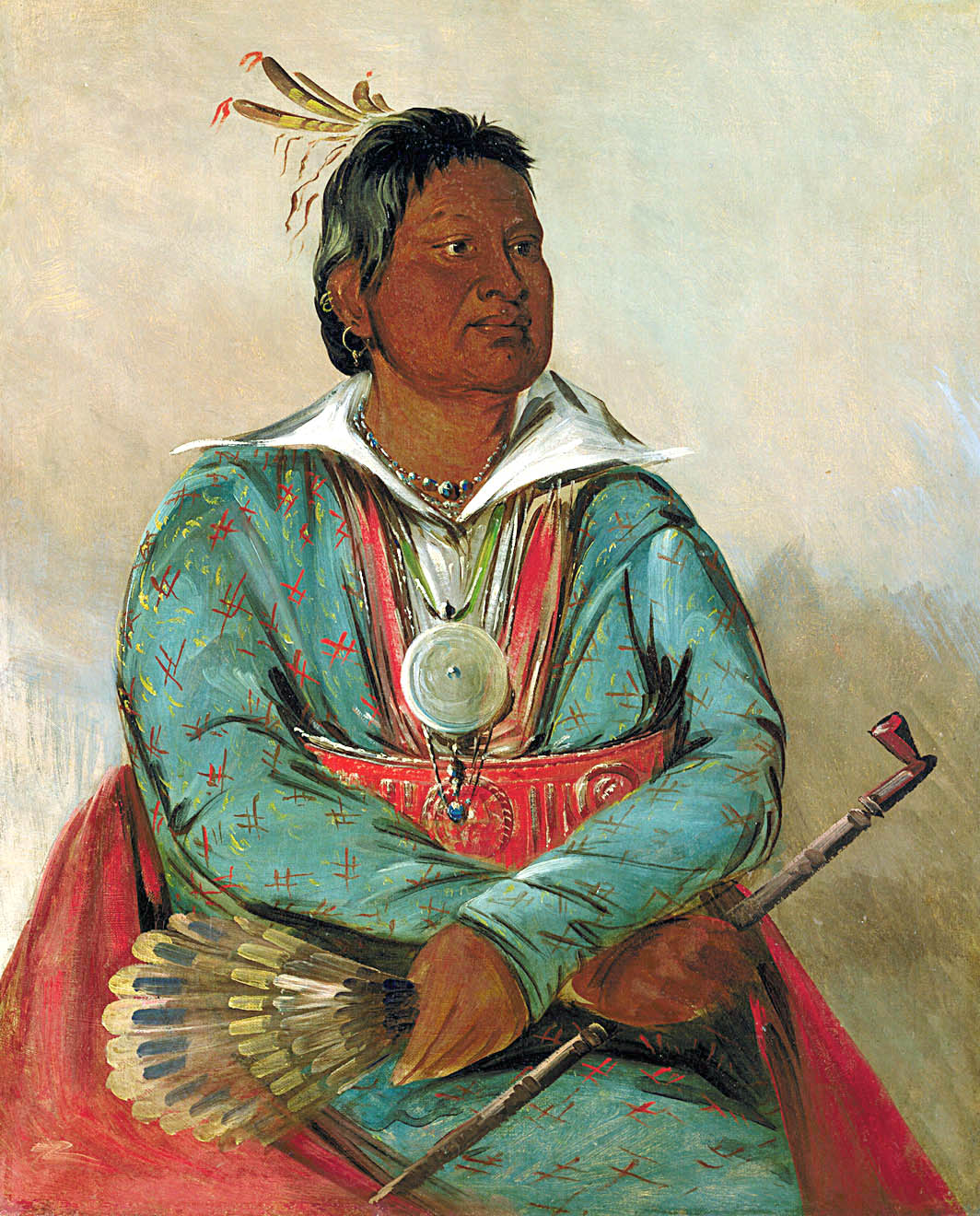
- Mosholatubbee, painted by George Catlin

Moshulatubbee District was one of three provinces, or districts, comprising the former Choctaw Nation in the Indian Territory. Also called the First District, it encompassed the northern one-third of the nation. In some historic records it is spelled Mushulatubbe.

The Moshulatubbee District was named in honor of Chief Moshulatubbee, a Choctaw Indian warrior and statesman. Moshulatubbee was chief of the Okla Tannap ("Lower Towns") District in the original Choctaw Nation of the Southeast. Many Choctaw from that period referred to the Moshulatubbee District as the Okla Tannap District. The other two districts were known as Apukshunnubbee and Pushmataha, also named after important leaders.

== History ==
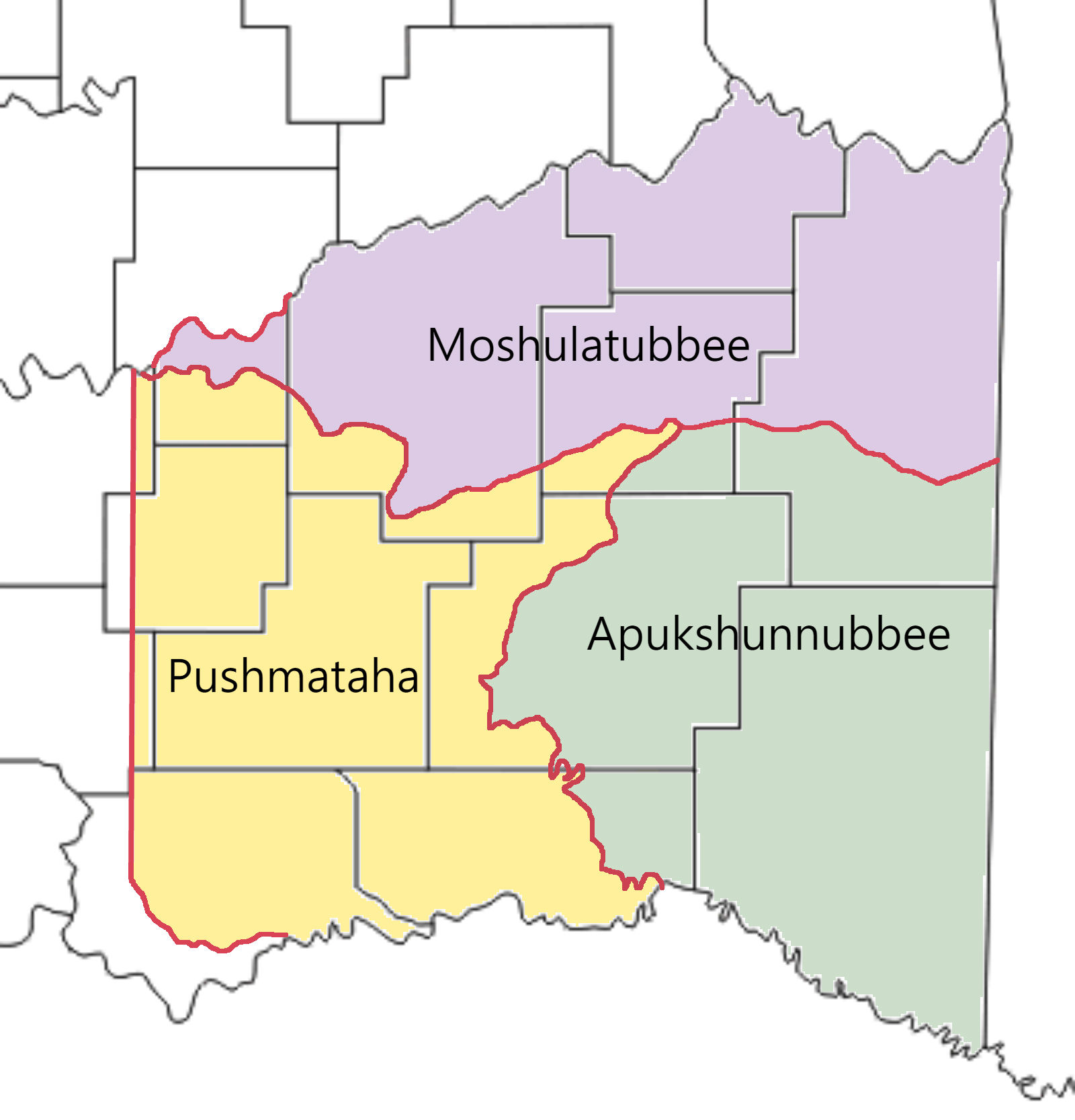
Moshulatubbee District covered the upper one-third of the Choctaw Nation.

The districts were established when the Choctaw Nation removed to the Indian Territory. These districts were intended as areas for members of the three major clans, or groupings of Choctaw who comprised the nation. In time, the clan affiliations and allegiances were reduced after the disruption of the move to Indian Territory, in part because of the losses of numerous members in the arduous relocation, called the Trail of Tears. The districts’ importance in the political life of the nation waned, and the district chiefs lost power and authority to the governor (under the 1858 constitution) and later, the principal chief of the nation. Eventually the position of the principal chief became simply, the chief. No longer a "first among equals", he became the sole political leader.

In judicial affairs, the three districts and their seats of government retained their historic influence. Most crimes within the tribal jurisdiction were tried at the county level. If they were of a certain category, they were tried automatically at the district level. Court days were the busiest days of the year in the district seats of government.

Moshulatubbee District’s administrative seat of government was Gaines Court House. This also served as the county seat of Gaines County. The court house was northeast of modern-day McAlester, Oklahoma.

Included in the Moshulatubbee District were the Choctaw counties of Gaines, Sans Bois, Skullyville, Sugar Loaf, and Tobucksy.

As Oklahoma's statehood loomed in the early 20th century, the Moshulatubbee District, and its constituent counties, slowly wound down their governmental functions. The United States Courts in the Indian Territory usurped their powers. On November 16, 1907, Oklahoma’s Statehood Day, the districts and their counties disappeared as active jurisdictions.

The territory of the former Moshulatubbee District is incorporated principally into the present-day Oklahoma counties of Haskell, Hughes, Latimer, Le Flore, and Pittsburg.
