= Tobucksy County, Choctaw Nation =

Tobucksy County was a political subdivision of the Choctaw Nation in the Indian Territory, prior to Oklahoma becoming a state. It was part of the Moshulatubbee District, or First District, one of three administrative and judicial provinces.

== History ==
The county was also spelled, variously, as Toboxy, Tobuxy and Tobaksi. Its name in Choctaw was Tobaksi Kaunti, for the Choctaw word meaning “coal.” Coal was known to be present in the area at the county's creation and later became its chief industry, in a string of coal mines stretching from McAlester and Perryville eastward.

Settlement was confined mostly to the valleys and lowlands, with farming and mining being the major activities. Tobucky County was defined by the Canadian River, which formed its northern border, the Shawnee Hills in the west, and the San Bois Mountains in the east.

The crossing of the east–west California Road (later becoming the busy Fort Arbuckle-to-Fort Smith military road) with the north–south Texas Road formed a natural point of settlement in Tobucksy County. A town called Perryville was established at this strategic location in 1838, developing into a prosperous trading center and, eventually, the county seat. The two major roads also ensured the county's economic vitality. During the Civil War a depot providing supplies to Confederate Forces in Indian Territory was set up at Perryville. On August 26, 1863, a force of 4,500 Union soldiers crossed the Canadian River and destroyed the Confederate munitions depot at Perryville. This became known as the Battle of Perryville, Indian Territory. Union Major General James G. Blunt, finding the Confederate supplies and realizing that Perryville was a major supply depot for Confederate forces, ordered the town burned. The town was rebuilt but never reached its prewar success.

Following the Civil War the Choctaw Nation signed a surrender treaty with the United States requiring it to allow the construction of railroads through its territory. The Missouri–Kansas–Texas Railroad, popularly known as the Katy, was the first, and opened in the early 1870s. The Katy became important for shipping coal, timber, and other commodities, and spurred the development of additional railroad lines.

Tobucksy County was not one of the original 19 counties created by the General Council of the Choctaw Nation in 1850. It came into being in November 1855, following changes to political boundaries caused by the establishment of the Chickasaw Nation from what had been the Chickasaw District of the Choctaw Nation.

The county served as an election district for members of the National Council, and as a unit of local administration. Constitutional officers, all of whom served for two-year terms and were elected by the voters, included the county judge, sheriff, and a ranger. The judge's duties included oversight of overall county administration. The sheriff collected taxes, monitored unlawful intrusion by intruders (usually white Americans from the United States), and conducted the census. The county ranger advertised and sold strayed livestock.

== Statehood ==
As Oklahoma's statehood approached, its leading citizens, who were gathered for the Oklahoma Constitutional Convention, realized in laying out the future state's counties that, while logically designed, the Choctaw Nation's counties could not exist as economically viable political subdivisions. In most the county seat existed generally for holding county court and not as a population center. While this was not true of Tobucksy County, with its bustling commercial towns and profitable coal mines, it would have to be dismantled in order to accommodate changes required by the region at large.

This conundrum was also recognized by the framers of the proposed State of Sequoyah, who met in 1905 to propose statehood for the Indian Territory. The Sequoyah Constitutional Convention also proposed a county structure that abolished the Choctaw counties. Tobucksy County was divided principally into the proposed Cheadle, Eufaula and Tobuxsy counties. Cheadle County would not have included any established towns of any size. The significant towns of Eufaula County would have been Checotah and Eufaula. Those of Tobuxsy County would have been McAlester and South McAlester, which had not been united as one by the federal government yet.

Almost none of this proposition was borrowed two years later by Oklahoma's framers, who adopted a very different county structure for the region. The territory formerly comprising Tobucksy County, Choctaw Nation now falls primarily or exclusively within Pittsburg County. Tobucksy County ceased to exist upon Oklahoma's statehood on November 16, 1907.
