= List of United States tornadoes in May 2008 =

In May 2008, various weather forecast offices of the National Weather Service confirmed 462 tornadoes in the United States. At the time, this was the third most active May on record for tornado activity in the country, only behind 2003 and 2004. Based on the long-term 1991–2020 average, an average May records 268 tornadoes in the United States. The brunt of activity was focused across three significant events, including a tornado outbreak from May 1–2 and tornado outbreak sequences encompassing May 7–11 and May 22–27. The most intense tornado of the month was an EF5 tornado that affected areas near Parkersburg, Iowa. It was the first such tornado in Iowa since June 13, 1976. In all, tornado activity across the United States in May 2008 resulted in 44 deaths and 683 injuries. The monetary cost of the May 22–27 tornado activity alone cost $4.2 billion (2008 USD).

== Daily statistics ==
There were 597 tornadoes reported in the United States in the month of May, of which 462 were confirmed.

Daily statistics of tornadoes during May 2008 (Note: All dates are based on the local time zone where the tornado touched down; however, all times are in Coordinated Universal Time for consistency.)
| Date | Total | Enhanced Fujita scale rating | | | | | | Deaths | Injuries | Damage (Note: Damage totals only include direct impact from tornadoes as tabulated by the National Centers for Environmental Information. Total damage from the broader weather complexes far exceed totals shown below.) |
| Date | Total | EF0 | EF1 | EF2 | EF3 | EF4 | EF5 | Deaths | Injuries | Damage |
|---|---|---|---|---|---|---|---|---|---|---|
| May 1 | 28 | 20 | 4 | 3 | 1 | 0 | 0 | 0 | 0 | $725,000 |
| May 2 | 34 | 8 | 17 | 7 | 2 | 0 | 0 | 6 | 45 | $81,456,000 |
| May 3 | 0 | 0 | 0 | 0 | 0 | 0 | 0 | 0 | 0 | $0 |
| May 4 | 0 | 0 | 0 | 0 | 0 | 0 | 0 | 0 | 0 | $0 |
| May 5 | 2 | 2 | 0 | 0 | 0 | 0 | 0 | 0 | 0 | $0 |
| May 6 | 3 | 3 | 0 | 0 | 0 | 0 | 0 | 0 | 0 | $0 |
| May 7 | 10 | 7 | 3 | 0 | 0 | 0 | 0 | 0 | 1 | $395,000 |
| May 8 | 27 | 11 | 10 | 5 | 2 | 0 | 0 | 1 | 7 | $20,058,000 |
| May 9 | 4 | 2 | 0 | 2 | 0 | 0 | 0 | 0 | 0 | $7,135,000 |
| May 10 | 34 | 13 | 16 | 3 | 1 | 1 | 0 | 22 | 375 | $139,470,000 |
| May 11 | 44 | 14 | 14 | 13 | 2 | 1 | 0 | 2 | 33 | $76,881,000 |
| May 12 | 0 | 0 | 0 | 0 | 0 | 0 | 0 | 0 | 0 | $0 |
| May 13 | 1 | 1 | 0 | 0 | 0 | 0 | 0 | 0 | 0 | $0 |
| May 14 | 12 | 10 | 2 | 0 | 0 | 0 | 0 | 0 | 0 | $570,000 |
| May 15 | 14 | 6 | 7 | 1 | 0 | 0 | 0 | 0 | 3 | $6,815,000 |
| May 16 | 0 | 0 | 0 | 0 | 0 | 0 | 0 | 0 | 0 | $0 |
| May 17 | 1 | 1 | 0 | 0 | 0 | 0 | 0 | 0 | 0 | $5,000 |
| May 18 | 1 | 1 | 0 | 0 | 0 | 0 | 0 | 0 | 0 | $0 |
| May 19 | 0 | 0 | 0 | 0 | 0 | 0 | 0 | 0 | 0 | $0 |
| May 20 | 6 | 4 | 2 | 0 | 0 | 0 | 0 | 0 | 4 | $46,135,000 |
| May 21 | 0 | 0 | 0 | 0 | 0 | 0 | 0 | 0 | 0 | $0 |
| May 22 | 28 | 16 | 8 | 3 | 1 | 0 | 0 | 1 | 81 | $151,945,000 |
| May 23 | 79 | 41 | 22 | 9 | 6 | 1 | 0 | 2 | 6 | >$5,325,000 (Note: Multiple entries for these days do not list damage estimates) |
| May 24 | 23 | 18 | 3 | 2 | 0 | 0 | 0 | 0 | 0 | >$265,000 |
| May 25 | 31 | 22 | 6 | 0 | 2 | 0 | 1 | 10 | 92 | $128,644,000 |
| May 26 | 7 | 5 | 2 | 0 | 0 | 0 | 0 | 0 | 0 | $65,000 |
| May 27 | 5 | 5 | 0 | 0 | 0 | 0 | 0 | 0 | 0 | $0 |
| May 28 | 4 | 4 | 0 | 0 | 0 | 0 | 0 | 0 | 1 | $10,000 |
| May 29 | 37 | 18 | 13 | 4 | 2 | 0 | 0 | 0 | 0 | $24,259,000 |
| May 30 | 19 | 8 | 8 | 3 | 0 | 0 | 0 | 0 | 34 | $49,888,000 |
| May 31 | 3 | 3 | 0 | 0 | 0 | 0 | 0 | 0 | 1 | $125,000 |
| Total | 434 | 243 | 137 | 55 | 19 | 3 | 1 | 44 | 683 | >$724,420,000 |

== List of confirmed tornadoes ==
=== May 1 event ===
List of confirmed tornadoes – Thursday, May 1, 2008
| EF# | Location | County / Parish | State | Start Coord. | Time (UTC) | Path length | Max width | Summary |
|---|---|---|---|---|---|---|---|---|
| EF0 | S of Elk Falls | Elk | KS | 37.36°N 96.18°W | 23:50–23:51 | 0.7 mi (1.1 km) | 50 yd (46 m) | A trained spotter observed a brief tornado. |
| EF0 | SW of Sioux Center | Sioux | IA | 43.0391°N 96.236°W | 23:55–23:56 | 0.1 mi (0.16 km) | 50 yd (46 m) | A trained spotter observed a brief tornado. |
| EF2 | S of Rock Valley to SE of Inwood | Sioux, Lyon | IA | 43.1421°N 96.3°W | 23:59–00:24 | 12.95 mi (20.84 km) | 400 yd (370 m) | This strong tornado impacted several farms, causing extensive damage to numerous barns, sheds, outbuildings, and grain bins. Many trees and power poles were snapped or uprooted along the tornado's path. |
| EF0 | ESE of Plattsburg | Clinton | MO | 39.56°N 94.42°W | 00:26–00:27 | 0.1 mi (0.16 km) | 25 yd (23 m) | A trained spotter observed a brief tornado. |
| EF0 | NW of Choctaw | Oklahoma | OK | 35.5002°N 97.2826°W | 00:29 | 0.1 mi (0.16 km) | 20 yd (18 m) | A brief tornado damaged trees and an outbuilding. |
| EF0 | E of Doon | Lyon | IA | 43.28°N 96.1902°W | 00:30–00:31 | 0.1 mi (0.16 km) | 50 yd (46 m) | A trained spotter observed a brief tornado. |
| EF0 | NNE of Buxton | Wilson | KS | 37.4908°N 95.899°W | 00:35–00:37 | 0.67 mi (1.08 km) | 50 yd (46 m) | A storm chaser observed a brief tornado. |
| EF0 | E of Fredonia | Wilson | KS | 37.5332°N 95.7937°W | 00:38–00:39 | 0.58 mi (0.93 km) | 50 yd (46 m) | A trained spotter observed a brief tornado. |
| EF0 | ENE of Glencoe | Payne | OK | 36.2411°N 96.8968°W | 00:42 | 0.3 mi (0.48 km) | 75 yd (69 m) | A brief tornado was reported over open fields. |
| EF0 | S of Sheldon | O'Brien | IA | 43.1366°N 95.87°W | 00:42–00:43 | 0.1 mi (0.16 km) | 50 yd (46 m) | A storm chaser observed a brief tornado. |
| EF0 | W of George | Lyon | IA | 43.35°N 96.0398°W | 00:44–00:45 | 0.1 mi (0.16 km) | 50 yd (46 m) | A trained spotter observed a brief tornado. |
| EF0 | NW of Ashton | Osceola | IA | 43.33°N 95.79°W | 01:05–01:06 | 0.1 mi (0.16 km) | 50 yd (46 m) | A storm chaser observed a brief tornado. |
| EF0 | NE of Pawnee | Pawnee | OK | 36.3402°N 96.7873°W | 01:18 | 0.3 mi (0.48 km) | 75 yd (69 m) | A storm chaser observed a brief tornado. |
| EF0 | NNE of Petrolia | Allen | KS | 37.78°N 95.45°W | 01:21–01:23 | 1.89 mi (3.04 km) | 75 yd (69 m) | A storm chaser observed a brief tornado. |
| EF1 | NW of Skedee | Pawnee | OK | 36.4012°N 96.734°W | 01:25–01:35 | 3 mi (4.8 km) | 300 yd (270 m) | One home was damaged while several trees and power poles were downed. |
| EF1 | SSE of Fairfax to WSW of Pawhuska | Osage | OK | 36.4497°N 96.638°W | 01:37–02:12 | 17 mi (27 km) | 450 yd (410 m) | This long-tracked tornado moved through the Osage Reservation, leaving behind extensive tree damage. Two homes suffered roof damage. |
| EF0 | WSW of Pawhuska | Osage | OK | 36.5779°N 96.4448°W | 02:06–02:17 | 5 mi (8.0 km) | 100 yd (91 m) | Power lines were downed and trees were damaged. |
| EF0 | Belton | Cass | MO | 38.82°N 94.53°W | 02:08–02:09 | 0.1 mi (0.16 km) | 25 yd (23 m) | Local law enforcement reported brief tornado. |
| EF0 | SW of Chanute | Neosho | KS | 37.6488°N 95.505°W | 02:14–02:15 | 0.73 mi (1.17 km) | 60 yd (55 m) | Local law enforcement reported a brief tornado. |
| EF0 | N of Earlton | Neosho | KS | 37.59°N 95.47°W | 02:44–02:45 | 0.38 mi (0.61 km) | 50 yd (46 m) | A trained spotter observed a brief tornado. |
| EF0 | E of Savonburg | Allen | KS | 37.752°N 95.1373°W | 02:51–02:52 | 0.64 mi (1.03 km) | 40 yd (37 m) | Local emergency management reported a brief tornado. |

=== May 2 event ===
List of confirmed tornadoes – Friday, May 2, 2008
| EF# | Location | County / Parish | State | Start Coord. | Time (UTC) | Path length | Max width | Summary |
|---|---|---|---|---|---|---|---|---|
| EF0 | NE of Lyndon | Osage | KS | 38.6405°N 95.6538°W | 05:43–05:45 | 1.5 mi (2.4 km) | 30 yd (27 m) | One home had its roof lifted off and dropped back onto it while the rest of the structure sustained minor damage. A three car garage was destroyed, with a motor home inside damaged, and debris was lofted 100 yd (91 m) downstream into a cemetery. |
| EF2 | NW of Clinton | Douglas | KS | 38.9712°N 95.4458°W | 06:04–06:06 | 2.22 mi (3.57 km) | 100 yd (91 m) | This brief but strong tornado moved two-thirds of a home and its garage off their foundations. Debris from these structures were strewn up to 500 yd (460 m) away. |
| EF0 | S of Bristow | Creek | OK | 35.8155°N 96.38°W | 06:45–06:51 | 7 mi (11 km) | 250 yd (230 m) | A barn was destroyed and trees and power lines were downed. |
| EF3 | NW of Liberty | Clay | MO | 39.2929°N 94.4903°W | 06:56–07:00 | 0.92 mi (1.48 km) | 75 yd (69 m) | A brief but intense tornado touched down along the north side of a bow echo, destroying 4 homes and damaging 117 others. Total damage is estimated at $4 million. |
| EF2 | Gladstone | Clay | MO | 39.2215°N 94.5767°W | 07:03–07:08 | 1.39 mi (2.24 km) | 75 yd (69 m) | The same bow echo that produced the preceding EF3 tornado produced another strong tornado farther south. This storm tracked directly through Gladstone, causing extensive damage. A total of 20 homes were destroyed, 280 suffered damage, and a further 19 businesses were damaged. Total losses were estimated to be $10 million. |
| EF1 | W of Pryor | Mayes | OK | 36.3°N 95.4098°W | 08:03 | 0.5 mi (0.80 km) | 100 yd (91 m) | A brief tornado downed trees and power lines and severely damaged the roof of one home. |
| EF1 | ENE of Tiawah to N of Pryor | Rogers, Mayes | OK | 36.3106°N 95.4428°W | 08:03–08:15 | 9 mi (14 km) | 100 yd (91 m) | Several homes suffered roof damage and two people were injured. Numerous trees and power poles were damaged along the tornado's path. |
| EF0 | SW of Ava | Douglas | MO | 36.8798°N 92.7995°W | 10:52–10:58 | 7.38 mi (11.88 km) | 250 yd (230 m) | Numerous trees were damaged along this tornado's path. |
| EF0 | NNW of Ava | Douglas | MO | 36.9596°N 92.6551°W | 11:02–11:03 | 0.35 mi (0.56 km) | 100 yd (91 m) | A brief tornado damaged trees and one home. |
| EF3 | NW of Springfield to N of Damascus to NNW of Drasco | Conway, Van Buren, Cleburne | AR | 36.9596°N 92.6551°W | 13:15–14:14 | 45.3 mi (72.9 km) | 1,600 yd (1,500 m) | 5 deaths – This large, long-lived tornado first touched down in Conway County, Arkansas, where it destroyed 15 homes and several small buildings and chicken houses. Two people were killed when their mobile home was destroyed. The tornado intensified as it moved through Van Buren County where it destroyed 17 permanent homes and 8 mobile homes; a further 49 homes sustained varying degrees of damage. Agricultural properties sustained significant damage. Three people were killed in the county. The tornado then continued into Cleburne County where it soon crossed Greers Ferry Lake. Nineteen boats and party barges sank at the lake, with cleanup of spilled fuel taking at least a month. It caused further destruction to 27 homes and 5 mobile homes; 162 other homes had varying degrees of damage. A dog kennel was destroyed, killing 250 dogs, and chicken houses suffered a similar fate resulting in the deaths of hundreds of chickens. Approximately 6,800 people lost power from damage to power lines, a transmission tower, and substation. Altogether, the tornado killed 5 people, injured 24 others, and inflicted $47 million in damage. |
| EF1 | WSW of Damascus | Van Buren | AR | 35.3747°N 92.4444°W | 13:28–13:30 | 1.05 mi (1.69 km) | 100 yd (91 m) | This was a satellite tornado to the EF3 Springfield–Drasco tornado, tracking simultaneously 0.5 mi (0.80 km) to its southeast. The tornado downed trees along its path. |
| EF1 | N of Canton | Van Zandt | TX | 32.5596°N 95.871°W | 13:30–13:34 | 1.33 mi (2.14 km) | 75 yd (69 m) | A weak tornado tracked through the north side of Canton, causing extensive tree damage. Several of these trees fell onto cars. Damage to structures was limited to two homes and a shed. The tornado tracked through the First Monday Trade Days site, injuring eight people in the area. |
| EF1 | SE of Umpire | Howard | AR | 34.241°N 94.026°W | 14:03–14:08 | 4.1 mi (6.6 km) | 50 yd (46 m) | Numerous trees were snapped or uprooted along this tornado's path, one of which damaged a mobile home. Two barns were destroyed. |
| EF1 | WNW of Billstown | Pike | AR | 33.9905°N 93.6297°W | 15:23–15:33 | 8.18 mi (13.16 km) | 200 yd (180 m) | Two chicken houses were badly damaged, one of which collapse, and a barn had a large portion of its roof torn off. |
| EF2 | SE of Tull to Keo to S of Lonoke | Grant, Saline, Pulaski, Lonoke | AR | 34.4116°N 92.4916°W | 16:15–17:15 | 40.72 mi (65.53 km) | 300 yd (270 m) | 1 death – A strong tornado began in Grant County, destroying 3 mobile homes, heavily damaging a house, and downing 2 large, steel, electrical transmission towers. It entered Saline County, impacting 16 homes; 4 were destroyed, 9 sustained major damage, and 3 suffered minor damage. In Pulaski County, it affected 75 homes, of which 21 were destroyed, 16 suffered major damage, 26 sustained minor damage, and the remainder experienced minimal damage. A woman was killed inside her demolished mobile home. Two more large, steel, electrical transmission towers were downed. The tornado then entered Lonoke County, where 2 houses were destroyed, 2 homes and 2 farm shops sustained roof damage, and power poles and grain bins were downed. A fish farm, 2 more farm shops, and 5 large, steel, electrical transmission towers were damaged or destroyed. Numerous trees were downed. Three people were injured. |
| EF1 | NE of Henderson | Rusk | TX | 32.183°N 94.764°W | 16:21–16:26 | 6.38 mi (10.27 km) | 100 yd (91 m) | A large metal building was completely destroyed, a house suffered minor damage, and numerous trees were snapped or uprooted. A hay barn was partially demolished. |
| EF2 | N of Carthage to Sheridan | Dallas, Grant | AR | 34.1397°N 92.5842°W | 16:23–16:57 | 22.85 mi (36.77 km) | 200 yd (180 m) | Manufactured homes and mobile homes were damaged or destroyed. Minor damage to well-built homes. Barns and outbuildings were destroyed and a church was damaged. In total, about 60 structures were damaged. |
| EF1 | SW of Beckville | Panola | TX | 32.202°N 94.524°W | 16:55–17:03 | 3.79 mi (6.10 km) | 200 yd (180 m) | A manufactured home lost its roof and other homes were damaged due to fallen trees. |
| EF1 | Carlisle | Lonoke | AR | 34.7743°N 91.7574°W | 17:56–18:02 | 2.55 mi (4.10 km) | 200 yd (180 m) | A tornado directly struck the town of Carlisle, damaging 25 homes, the fire station, an old railroad depot, a storage garage, an automotive repair garage, a beauty shop, and a minnow farm. Multiple trees, power lines, and power poles were downed as well. |
| EF0 | WNW of Cotton Plant | Woodruff | AR | 35.012°N 91.3395°W | 18:01–18:07 | 2.09 mi (3.36 km) | 50 yd (46 m) | Two metal-roofed structures had sheets of metal damaged or ripped off. Trees were damaged. |
| EF1 | NE of Carlisle | Lonoke, Prairie | AR | 34.803°N 91.6987°W | 18:02–18:04 | 1.68 mi (2.70 km) | 250 yd (230 m) | Trees were downed. |
| EF1 | NW of Hazen | Prairie | AR | 34.8461°N 91.6382°W | 18:05–18:06 | 2.58 mi (4.15 km) | 100 yd (91 m) | Approximately two dozen trees were damaged and a power pole was toppled. |
| EF0 | NE of Senath | Dunklin | MO | 36.1505°N 90.1447°W | 18:39–18:40 | 0.29 mi (0.47 km) | 25 yd (23 m) | A section of a center pivot irrigation system was flipped, and a barn sustained moderate damage. |
| EF0 | S of Cotton Plant | Monroe | AR | 34.9556°N 91.2622°W | 18:40–18:41 | 0.35 mi (0.56 km) | 50 yd (46 m) | One tree was uprooted and tin was removed from barns. |
| EF2 | Etowah | Mississippi | AR | 35.6899°N 90.2371°W | 19:54–19:58 | 3.38 mi (5.44 km) | 150 yd (140 m) | A strong tornado moved through Etowah, inflicting major damage to two homes, ripping the roof off a third, and tearing the back structure off of a fourth; four other homes sustained moderate damage and one sustained minor damage. A car dealership and ten accompanied vehicles in the car lot were completely destroyed. Numerous trees, power poles, and power lines were toppled, and several outbuildings were demolished. A mobile home was destroyed while a recreational vehicle and an irrigation system were overturned. One person was injured. |
| EF3 | SE of Parkin to Earle to S of Birdsong | Cross, Crittenden, Mississippi | AR | 35.2329°N 90.5188°W | 20:18–20:48 | 20.23 mi (32.56 km) | 400 yd (370 m) | A significant tornado touched down in Cross County, causing minimal damage. It continued into Crittenden County where it intensified to EF3 strength, severely damaging a high school, a church, a number of homes, and a large house in Earle; four serious injuries occurred there. After progressing into Heafer, a number of homes suffered significant damage. Two mobile homes were destroyed, and several trees and power lines were toppled. The tornado caused minor tree damage in Mississippi County before dissipating. |
| EF0 | E of Livingston | Livingston | LA | 30.5°N 90.666°W | 20:51–20:53 | 0.1 mi (0.16 km) | 20 yd (18 m) | Weak tornado reported by a motorist near Interstate 12. No damage occurred. |
| EF2 | WSW of Dyersburg | Dyer | TN | 35.96°N 89.6665°W | 21:25–21:27 | 1.37 mi (2.20 km) | 40 yd (37 m) | A mobile home was destroyed and power lines were downed. |
| EF2 | W of New Albany | Union | MS | 34.462°N 89.1634°W | 22:48–22:52 | 3.11 mi (5.01 km) | 440 yd (400 m) | About 20 homes suffered varying degrees of damage, the worst of which had their roofs ripped off and exterior walls damaged. A couple of sheds, a gas station canopy and sign, and several large buildings were damaged. A church suffered roof damage and had its steeple toppled. A large bus was flipped onto its side, and numerous trees were snapped or uprooted. |
| EF2 | New Albany | Union | MS | 34.5087°N 89.0342°W | 23:00–23:01 | 0.52 mi (0.84 km) | 100 yd (91 m) | About 10 homes were damaged, including two that lost their roofs and saw some exterior wall collapse. A gas station canopy was damaged, and many trees were snapped or uprooted. |
| EF1 | NE of New Albany | Union | MS | 34.5265°N 88.9426°W | 23:12–23:16 | 3.46 mi (5.57 km) | 75 yd (69 m) | Two homes sustained roof damage; one had its porch torn off while the second saw partial collapse of its garage wall. Several grain bins were heavily damaged, a shed was destroyed, and numerous trees were uprooted. |
| EF1 | Booneville to Rienzi | Prentiss, Alcorn | MS | 34.6331°N 88.6779°W | 23:41–00:03 | 13.77 mi (22.16 km) | 150 yd (140 m) | Several homes had shingles ripped off or were damaged by fallen trees. Several outbuildings were heavily damaged or destroyed. |
| EF2 | NW of Lake Village | Chicot | AR | 33.36°N 91.4°W | 23:52–00:10 | 10.52 mi (16.93 km) | 400 yd (370 m) | A mobile home was flipped and destroyed. Several sheds, barns, outbuildings, and carports were damaged or destroyed. A 50 ft (15 m) antenna and fencing were toppled, two boats were damaged, the roll-up door for a tractor shed was damaged, and a trampoline was tossed 75 yd (69 m). Fifteen power poles were snapped. |
| EF0 | SW of Benoit | Washington, Bolivar | MS | 33.5113°N 91.1206°W | 00:32–00:35 | 2.96 mi (4.76 km) | 50 yd (46 m) | A little debris was thrown across a field. |
| EF0 | NW of Mer Rouge | Morehouse | LA | 32.8032°N 91.8378°W | 01:01–01:06 | 3.3 mi (5.3 km) | 50 yd (46 m) | Trees suffered minor damage and grass was flattened. |
| EF1 | NE of Benoit | Bolivar | MS | 33.6729°N 90.9225°W | 01:07–01:21 | 9.69 mi (15.59 km) | 200 yd (180 m) | Numerous trees were snapped or uprooted. Power lines were snapped in one location. |
| EF1 | SW of Clarksville | Montgomery | TN | 36.37°N 87.55°W | 03:55–? | 5 mi (8.0 km) | 500 yd (460 m) | One mobile home was blown off its base and tossed across the road. Another mobile home was rolled over, injuring three occupants. Many trees were snapped or uprooted. The National Centers for Environmental Information incorrectly lists this tornado as three separate events. |
| EF1 | Clarksville | Montgomery | TN | 36.50°N 87.38°W | 04:13 | 0.29 mi (0.47 km) | 50 yd (46 m) | A pavilion was destroyed, telephone poles were snapped, bleachers were damaged, fencing was blown away, and a wooden utility pole was leant at the Montgomery County Fairgrounds. |

=== May 3 event ===
List of confirmed tornadoes – Saturday, May 3, 2008
| EF# | Location | County / Parish | State | Start Coord. | Time (UTC) | Path length | Max width | Summary |
|---|---|---|---|---|---|---|---|---|
| EF1 | E of Morgan City | Leflore | MS | 33.3743°N 90.3308°W | 05:49–05:51 | 1.29 mi (2.08 km) | 300 yd (270 m) | Numerous trees were snapped or uprooted, one of which caused significant damage to a house upon falling. |

=== May 5 event ===
List of confirmed tornadoes – Monday, May 5, 2008
| EF# | Location | County / Parish | State | Start Coord. | Time (UTC) | Path length | Max width | Summary |
|---|---|---|---|---|---|---|---|---|
| EF0 | ENE of Imperial | Pecos | TX | 31.2811°N 102.6487°W | 22:25–22:27 | 2.28 mi (3.67 km) | 50 yd (46 m) | A brief tornado was reported by a trained spotter and relayed by local media. No damage was reported. |
| EF0 | W of Crane | Crane | TX | 31.4°N 102.4687°W | 22:59–23:02 | 2.68 mi (4.31 km) | 50 yd (46 m) | A trained relayed a report of a tornado to law enforcement. No damage was reported. |

=== May 6 event ===
List of confirmed tornadoes – Monday, May 5, 2008
| EF# | Location | County / Parish | State | Start Coord. | Time (UTC) | Path length | Max width | Summary |
|---|---|---|---|---|---|---|---|---|
| EF0 | SE of Congress | Yavapai | AZ | 34.0477°N 112.7064°W | 20:15–20:16 | 0.2 mi (0.32 km) | 20 yd (18 m) | A trained spotter reported a brief tornado touchdown with no damage. |
| EF0 | SW of Maywood | Frontier | NE | 40.6086°N 100.7009°W | 23:30 | 0.1 mi (0.16 km) | 10 yd (9.1 m) | A brief tornado over open rangeland caused no damage. |
| EF0 | NNW of Wellman to W of Brownfield | Terry | TX | 33.1302°N 102.4697°W | 23:45–23:46 | 1.5 mi (2.4 km) | 75 yd (69 m) | A supercell thunderstorm interacted with an outflow boundary and produced this short-lived and weak tornado over open country that was documented by a research meteorologist. No damage was reported. |

=== May 7 event ===
List of confirmed tornadoes – Wednesday, May 7, 2008
| EF# | Location | County / Parish | State | Start Coord. | Time (UTC) | Path length | Max width | Summary |
|---|---|---|---|---|---|---|---|---|
| EF0 | NNW of Smyer | Hockley | TX | 33.6426°N 102.1921°W | 16:50–16:52 | 1.2 mi (1.9 km) | 20 yd (18 m) | Several people reported a rope tornado. |
| EF0 | S of Casper | Natrona | WY | 42.806°N 106.3181°W | 21:12 | 0.05 mi (0.080 km) | 30 yd (27 m) | A car was lifted off the ground, and flying debris was spotted. |
| EF1 | ESE of Paoli | Garvin | OK | 34.8023°N 97.1786°W | 21:56–21:57 | 0.5 mi (0.80 km) | 30 yd (27 m) | A mobile home was moved off its foundation; one occupant was injured. Trees were damaged near the residence. |
| EF1 | E of Yukon | Canadian, Oklahoma | OK | 35.5°N 97.7222°W | 21:57–22:09 | 7.5 mi (12.1 km) | 120 yd (110 m) | A residence lost a portion of its roof, and sporadic damage to fences was observed. Several bleachers were damaged next to a baseball field, and trees were downed, including one that fell on a gas plant and prompted the evacuation of about 50 residents. An apartment complex suffered some damage. A woman broke her leg running to her tornado shelter. |
| EF0 | S of Norman | McClain, Cleveland | OK | 35.1449°N 97.4737°W | 22:21–22:31 | 4.6 mi (7.4 km) | 25 yd (23 m) | Intermittent roof, tree, and roof flashing damage was reported. |
| EF0 | N of The Village | Oklahoma | OK | 35.6369°N 97.5841°W | 22:22–22:26 | 2.8 mi (4.5 km) | 20 yd (18 m) | A residence and an apartment complex sustained roof damage. Scattered tree and sign damage was reported as well. |
| EF0 | SSW of Beggs | Okmulgee | OK | 35.6507°N 96.1228°W | 23:40–23:45 | 4 mi (6.4 km) | 200 yd (180 m) | A small barn was destroyed, a mobile home was damaged, and numerous trees and power lines were toppled. |
| EF0 | Broken Arrow | Tulsa | OK | 36.0592°N 95.8125°W | 00:28–00:29 | 0.3 mi (0.48 km) | 50 yd (46 m) | Portions of a storage building at a college was blown off. Roofs of a business and several homes were damaged. Power lines and trees were blown down. |
| EF0 | SSE of Bremond | Robertson | TX | 31.14°N 96.66°W | 01:10–01:12 | 0.99 mi (1.59 km) | 50 yd (46 m) | Power lines were downed and trees were damaged. |
| EF1 | E of Bremond | Robertson | TX | 31.1846°N 96.5369°W | 01:15–01:23 | 2.6 mi (4.2 km) | 250 yd (230 m) | Numerous trees were downed or damaged. |
| EF0 | NE of Franklin | Robertson | TX | 31.0829°N 96.438°W | 01:39–01:48 | 2.08 mi (3.35 km) | 50 yd (46 m) | The Franklin Fire Department reported a tornado. |

=== May 8 event ===
List of confirmed tornadoes – Thursday, May 8, 2008
| EF# | Location | County / Parish | State | Start Coord. | Time (UTC) | Path length | Max width | Summary |
|---|---|---|---|---|---|---|---|---|
| EF3 | Tupelo | Lee | MS | 34.2599°N 88.7935°W | 13:01–13:19 | 7.56 mi (12.17 km) | 200 yd (180 m) | A significant tornado produced extensive damage to the Furniture Market Mississippi building in Tupelo. It then struck a farm supply store, where flying debris damaged several cars, tractor trailers were overturned, and part of the store's roof was ripped off. A marine and outdoor store nearby saw several of its boats damaged and roof partially torn off. A large hardware store, a medical complex, and a Mississippi Department of Transportation district office were also among many other structures damaged. Large trees were snapped or uprooted. |
| EF2 | SW of Marietta | Itawamba | MS | 34.4289°N 88.5264°W | 13:42–13:45 | 1.4 mi (2.3 km) | 100 yd (91 m) | One house was heavily damaged and numerous other houses had minor damage. Many large trees were snapped. |
| EF0 | Abbeville | Lafayette | MS | 34.5034°N 89.5123°W | 14:15–14:19 | 2.2 mi (3.5 km) | 50 yd (46 m) | Minor damage was reported to nine houses and one mobile home. |
| EF1 | NW of Florence | Lauderdale | AL | 34.84°N 87.87°W | 16:57–17:04 | 7.99 mi (12.86 km) | 200 yd (180 m) | Five homes were damaged and several trees were uprooted. Two people were injured by flying glass. |
| EF1 | NW of Loretto | Lawrence | TN | 35.0778°N 87.4868°W | 17:35–17:42 | 3.02 mi (4.86 km) | 440 yd (400 m) | A barn was destroyed and several trees were snapped or uprooted; one tree fell on a home. |
| EF2 | NE of Leighton to N of Rogersville | Colbert, Lawrence, Lauderdale | AL | 34.7377°N 87.4677°W | 17:39–18:02 | 12.62 mi (20.31 km) | 250 yd (230 m) | A strong tornado began in Colbert County, throwing two cars nearly 40 ft (12 m) at an equipment company. One home was destroyed and a second was heavily damaged, large trees were snapped or uprooted, and an 18-wheeler was overturned. It continued into Lawrence County, producing significant structural damage to the Doublehead Resort and Lodge; a two-story house was lifted off its foundation and moved nearly 20 ft (6.1 m), and the entire roof and west facade was ripped off. The tornado weakened in Lauderdale County, producing sporadic damage to a garage and large trees before lifting. |
| EF1 | Kansas | Fayette, Walker | AL | 33.865°N 87.733°W | 18:06–18:25 | 11.04 mi (17.77 km) | 100 yd (91 m) | A shed was destroyed with another one damaged. Trees were also snapped. |
| EF0 | SE of Pulaski | Giles | TN | 35.142°N 86.9564°W | 18:45–18:47 | 0.85 mi (1.37 km) | 50 yd (46 m) | Trees were snapped, uprooted, or twisted. |
| EF0 | SE of Selkirk | Wichita | KS | 38.3898°N 101.4876°W | 18:49–18:56 | 2 mi (3.2 km) | 25 yd (23 m) | A trained storm spotter reported a tornado over open fields. |
| EF1 | SE of Arley | Walker, Cullman | AL | 33.9718°N 87.1825°W | 19:00–19:07 | 3.27 mi (5.26 km) | 600 yd (550 m) | Hundreds of trees were snapped or uprooted, at least six chicken houses were damaged or destroyed, and at least five boat houses were demolished in Walker County. A roof was partially torn off a chicken house in Cullman County. |
| EF1 | NW of Hartselle | Morgan | AL | 34.478°N 87.0022°W | 19:15–19:17 | 0.86 mi (1.38 km) | 50 yd (46 m) | Multiple medium to large trees were uprooted, and several smaller trees and branches were snapped. |
| EF1 | Trimble | Cullman | AL | 34.0785°N 86.9988°W | 19:20–19:32 | 3.27 mi (5.26 km) | 100 yd (91 m) | Several large trees were snapped or uprooted, some of which caused damage to apartments and campers upon falling. |
| EF0 | SE of Tribune | Greeley | KS | 38.3984°N 101.6586°W | 19:27–19:46 | 5 mi (8.0 km) | 100 yd (91 m) | A storm chaser observed a dusty tornado over open fields. |
| EF1 | SW of Triana | Limestone, Madison | AL | 34.5707°N 86.8201°W | 19:35–19:43 | 4.01 mi (6.45 km) | 250 yd (230 m) | Wheat and grass was flattened and one residence had minor roof damage. |
| EF1 | NE of Cullman | Cullman | AL | 34.1823°N 86.8014°W | 19:40–19:48 | 6.58 mi (10.59 km) | 100 yd (91 m) | Several large trees were snapped or uprooted. A pair of chicken houses were heavily damaged; one was completely collapsed, with the central portion of the structure twisted and its metal roofing torn off and tossed downstream. |
| EF0 | Port William | Clinton | OH | 39.55°N 83.78°W | 21:20–21:22 | 0.39 mi (0.63 km) | 20 yd (18 m) | Minor tree and trailer damage occurred. |
| EF0 | Jamestown | Greene | OH | 39.6543°N 83.7285°W | 21:25–21:27 | 0.07 mi (0.11 km) | 10 yd (9.1 m) | An emergency manager reported a tornado. |
| EF0 | NNE of Selma | Clark | OH | 39.7895°N 83.7169°W | 22:13–22:15 | 0.16 mi (0.26 km) | 10 yd (9.1 m) | A trained storm spotter reported a tornado. |
| EF1 | N of Figsboro | Henry, Franklin | VA | 36.7965°N 79.8518°W | 00:00–00:03 | 0.93 mi (1.50 km) | 75 yd (69 m) | Numerous trees were downed and two homes were damaged. |
| EF1 | N of Pullens | Pittsylvania | VA | 36.9346°N 79.5096°W | 01:00–01:03 | 0.84 mi (1.35 km) | 60 yd (55 m) | Numerous trees were snapped, and nearby homes suffered some damage. |
| EF2 | N of Advance | Davie, Forsyth | NC | 35.9639°N 80.4613°W | 02:15–02:24 | 3.54 mi (5.70 km) | 100 yd (91 m) | A frame house was heavily damaged. |
| EF0 | NE of Shipman | Nelson | VA | 37.7272°N 78.8388°W | 02:20–02:21 | 0.19 mi (0.31 km) | 50 yd (46 m) | Two homes suffered significant structural damage. One saw part of its roof removed and its porch lifted from its foundation. Several trees were uprooted and a car was overturned. |
| EF3 | SE of Clemmons | Forsyth | NC | 35.9835°N 80.3753°W | 02:25–02:34 | 2.9 mi (4.7 km) | 300 yd (270 m) | A significant tornado destroyed three homes and inflicted moderate damage to about thirty others. Several other homes suffered damage largely from fallen trees. Two people were injured. |
| EF1 | W of Hixburg | Appomattox | VA | 37.3244°N 78.697°W | 03:20–03:21 | 0.68 mi (1.09 km) | 50 yd (46 m) | Numerous trees were downed and two homes and two small structures were damaged. The tornado was embedded within a larger area of straight-line winds. |
| EF2 | W of Greensboro | Guilford | NC | 36.059°N 80.0206°W | 03:29–03:37 | 3.85 mi (6.20 km) | 200 yd (180 m) | 1 death – Numerous warehouses sustained significant damage, the roof was blown off an office building, and numerous vehicles and tractor trailers were overturned; a man who slept in the rig of one of these tractor trailers was killed. Three other people were injured, two in vehicles and one in a warehouse. |
| EF0 | Clinton | Prince George's | MD | 38.768°N 76.9438°W | 04:24–04:28 | 0.54 mi (0.87 km) | 50 yd (46 m) | Numerous trees were downed onto homes, inflicting substantial damage. |
| EF0 | Camp Springs | Prince George's | MD | 38.8317°N 76.9141°W | 04:56–05:00 | 0.48 mi (0.77 km) | 100 yd (91 m) | Numerous trees were downed onto townhouses, inflicting substantial damage. |

=== May 9 event ===
List of confirmed tornadoes – Friday, May 9, 2008
| EF# | Location | County / Parish | State | Start Coord. | Time (UTC) | Path length | Max width | Summary |
|---|---|---|---|---|---|---|---|---|
| EF2 | Gastonia to Northern Charlotte | Gaston, Mecklenburg | NC | 35.2535°N 81.1765°W | 06:10–06:36 | 18.21 mi (29.31 km) | 75 yd (69 m) | The first of two EF2 tornadoes in North Carolina on May 9 touched down around 1:10 am EST near Gastonia. Upon first touching down, the tornado tore off the roof of an office building. Traveling towards the east-northeast, it damaged numerous homes and uprooted trees before crossing Interstate 85 where it blew several cars of the road. Near the interstate, a metal roof was ripped off a large warehouse and another business was damaged before the tornado moved into Mecklenburg County. After moving into Mecklenburg, the tornado produced only minor tree damage before lifting near Charlotte. No injuries were reported as a result of the tornado and damages amounted to $7 million along its 18 miles (29 km) path. |
| EF2 | ENE of Trap to NW of Ryland | Bertie, Hertford, Chowan | NC | 36.2043°N 76.8241°W | 12:29–12:49 | 11.7 mi (18.8 km) | 300 yd (270 m) | The second EF2 tornado in North Carolina touched down around 7:29 am EST near the town of Trap. It destroyed one barn in Bertie County and downed several trees before moving into Hertford. The tornado tore the roofs off of two homes in Hertford along a 5 miles (8.0 km) path before entering Chowan County. The tornado weakened slightly once in Chowan, minor damages in the county were reported to some structures and several trees. No injuries were reported as a result of the tornado and damages amounted to $120,000 along its 12 miles (19 km) path. |
| EF0 | NNW of Elizabeth City | Pasquotank | NC | 36.3535°N 76.2575°W | 13:30–13:32 | 0.5 mi (0.80 km) | 50 yd (46 m) | A brief tornado touched down to the north-northwest of Elizabeth City. One mobile home was shifted off its foundation and another was damaged by a fallen tree. No injuries were reported as a result of the tornado and damages amounted to $15,000. |
| EF0 | SE of Rochelle | Weston | NC | 43.552°N 104.881°W | 20:12–20:15 | 0.1 mi (0.16 km) | 150 yd (140 m) | An airplane pilot reported a brief tornado and two funnel clouds over open fields. |

=== May 10 event ===
List of reported tornadoes – Saturday, May 10, 2008
| EF# | Location | County | Coord. | Time (UTC) | Path length | Damage |
|---|---|---|---|---|---|---|
Oklahoma
| EF2 | NW of Haywood to McAlester | Pittsburg | 34°56′N 95°48′W | 2203 | 8 miles (12.8 km) | KFOR-TV reports numerous houses destroyed in the area west of McAlester. The tornado was caught on tape from the air by KFOR helicopter reporter Jim Gardner and photojournalist Cody Crouch, as the storm weakened and dissipated in McAlester causing minor damage in the city. |
| EF0 | NE of Checotah | McIntosh | | 2219 | unknown | Brief tornado over open country |
| EF4 | Picher/Neosho, Missouri areas | Craig, Ottawa, Newton (MO), Barry (MO) | 36°55′N 94°35′W | 2220 | 75 miles (121 km) | 21 deaths – See article on this tornado |
| EF0 | SE of Crowder | Pittsburg | 35°05′N 95°38′W | 2221 | unknown | Tornado reported by a media chaser. No damage reported. |
| EF0 | SW of McAlester | Pittsburg | | 2225 | 1 mile (1.6 km) | Damage to trees |
| EF0 | NE of Pryor | Mayes | 36°35′N 95°27′W | 2225 | 0.1 mile (160 m) | Tornado remained in open country with minor tree damage. |
| EF0 | Wilburton area | Latimer | | 2234 | 6 miles (9.6 km) | Tornado over a remote area |
| EF2 | SW of Hartshorne to Yanush | Latimer, Pittsburg | | 2242 | 22 miles (35 km) | Tornado destroyed mobile homes, sheds, a business, barns and outbuildings with heavy damage to houses including some destroyed in Yanush. 4 people were injured. |
| EF1 | E of Quapaw | Ottawa | | 2248 | 2 miles (3.2 km) | Satellite tornado adjacent to the main Picher-Racine tornado. The tornado merged into the main cyclone and it enlarged to 1 mile (1.6 km) in width entering Missouri. |
| EF2 | E of Daisy | Atoka, Pushmataha | 34°33′N 95°41′W | 2305 | 3.5 miles (5.6 km) | Three houses were heavily damaged. One woman was trapped but not injured. Trees were snapped and uprooted |
| EF1 | N of Snow | Pushmataha | 34°45′N 93°53′W | 2330 | 1.5 miles (2.4 km) | Trees were snapped or uprooted |
| EF1 | E of Albion | Pushmataha | 34°45′N 93°53′W | 2335 | 1 mile (1.6 km) | Trees were snapped or uprooted |
| EF0 | SW of Smithville | McCurtain | | 0005 | 0.25 mile (400 m) | Damage limited to trees |
Kansas
| EF0 | N of Oswego | Labette | | 2215 | unknown | Brief touchdown a corn stalk field |
| EF0 | SE of Oswego | Labette | | 2219 | 1 mile (1.6 km) | Brief touchdown in an open field |
| EF0 | W of Faulkner | Cherokee | 37°10′N 95°05′W | 2219 | 2 miles (3.2 km) | Intermittent tornado path with minor damage to one house and a grain elevator. |
Arkansas
| EF1 | S of Bentonville | Benton | | 2335 | 1.5 miles (2.4 km) | Tornado spotted near a Wal-Mart according to 40/29 News coverage. Part of a roof was blown off a school. |
| EF1 | W of Center Hill | White | | 0014 | 9 miles (14.4 km) | Damage to trees |
| EF0 | SW of Russell | White | | 0042 | unknown | Brief tornado touchdown in an open field with no damage reported. |
| EF1 | SW of Fairmont | Lonoke, Prairie | | 0047 | unknown | Damage limited to trees |
| EF0 | E of Watalula | Franklin | 35°34′N 93°50′W | 0051 | unknown | Tornado sighted with minor damage to trees. |
| EF1 | SW of Avon | Sevier | | 0055 | 2 miles (3.2 km) | Many trees were snapped, some of which fell on and damaged houses. |
| EF1 | Tipp area | Woodruff, Cross | 35°15′N 91°17′W | 0057 | 10.2 miles (16.5 km) | A carport and tractor shed were destroyed, and several farm buildings were heavily damaged. Some houses also lost shingles. |
| EF3 | Stuttgart area | Arkansas | 34°49′N 91°55′W | 0057 | 14 miles (22.4 km) | Structural damage to many buildings reported in town, and trees were reported downed. 200 houses, 50 businesses, a nursing home, school buildings and several churches were damaged. Nine people were injured. |
| EF1 | SE of Lawrenceville | Monroe | | 0126 | 4.4 miles (7 km) | Damage mostly consisted of downed trees, although one house lost parts of its roof. |
| EF0 | SE of Oakhaven | Hempstead | | 0204 | 1 mile (1.6 km) | A metal farm outbuilding had roof damage. |
| EF1 | SW of Rosston | Nevada | 33°58′N 93°31′W | 0232 | 2 miles (3.2 km) | Damage primarily in a wooded area |
Missouri
| EF1 | E of Carthage | Jasper | 37°18′N 94°24′W | 2308 | 3.25 miles (5.2 km) | 1 death – One mobile home was destroyed by fallen trees (where the fatality took place). Several other houses were damaged and outbuildings were destroyed. |
| EF0 | NW of Jenkins | Barry | 36°47′N 93°44′W | 2358 | 4 miles (6.4 km) | Damage limited to trees |
Mississippi
| EF1 | West Marks | Quitman | | 0233 | 0.33 mile (550 m) | Brief tornado damaged a few houses and a metal building. |
| EF1 | Enid area | Tallahatchie, Yalobusha | 34°14′N 90°01′W | 0318 | 8.5 miles (14 km) | Heavy damage reported in the area. 28 houses damaged, several seriously. Three mobile homes were destroyed. Two people were injured. |
Alabama
| EF1 | E of Wright | Lauderdale | | 0400 | 1.6 miles (2.6 km) | A barn and an outbuilding were destroyed, throwing roofing materials up to 1/2 mile (800 m) away. |
| EF1 | S of Shotsville | Marion | | 0418 | 25 miles (40 km) | Tornado embedded in a derecho that moved across the area. Thousands of trees were snapped or uprooted. Several mobile homes were damaged and one carport was also damaged. Report courtesy of ABC 33-40. |
| EF1 | N of Anderson | Lauderdale | | 0459 | 1.5 miles (2.4 km) | Minor structural damage reported to an outbuilding. Many trees snapped. |
Sources: Storms Reports for May 10, 2008, NWS Springfield, NWS Little Rock, NWS Tulsa, NWS Tulsa - Multimedia Presentation, 2008 Oklahoma tornadoes, NWS Birmingham, NWS Huntsville, NWS Memphis

=== May 11 event ===
List of reported tornadoes – Sunday, May 11, 2008
| EF# | Location | County | Coord. | Time (UTC) | Path length | Damage |
|---|---|---|---|---|---|---|
Alabama
| EF1 | Sunlight area | Walker | | 0527 | 9.3 miles (14.9 km) | Damage to several structures and numerous trees were snapped or uprooted |
| EF2 | Colony area | Cullman, Walker | | 0537 | 13.3 miles (21 km) | Widespread tree damage across the area. Several chicken houses were destroyed. |
| EF1 | Heflin | Cleburne | | 0736 | 4.2 miles (6.7 km) | Six structures were destroyed and 35 homes were damaged. Hundreds of trees were snapped or uprooted. |
| EF1 | E of Heflin | Cleburne | | 0747 | 2.4 miles (3.9 km) | Several houses were heavily damaged with roofs blown off. Many trees were snapped. |
Georgia
| EF2 | ENE of LaGrange | Troup | 33°05′N 84°55′W | 0808 | 1 miles (1.6 km) | One home was destroyed and three others were damaged |
| EF2 | Jonesville | Carroll | | 0808 | 100 yds (90 m) | Brief spin-up tornado embedded in a derecho which blew two roofs off houses. Some damage to dorms of University of West Georgia. |
| EF2 | SE of Hogansville | Troup, Meriwether | | 0818 | 4 miles (6.4 km) | The roof of a brick home was removed and a cinder block outbuilding and a shed were destroyed. Two trucks were destroyed and another house was damaged. Numerous trees were snapped or uprooted. |
| EF2 | E of Jonesville | Carroll | | 0825 | 100 yds (90 m) | One home was destroyed, and several others had major roof damage.. |
| EF2 | NE of Morrow | Clayton, Henry, Rockdale, Newton | 33°38′N 84°17′W | 0917 | 19 miles (31 km) | One house heavily damaged just east of Interstate 675 with its second floor removed. Many other houses damaged. |
| EF2 | Lizella/Macon | Bibb, Twiggs | 32°50′N 83°40′W | 0950 | 18 miles (29 km) | At least one house destroyed along Lake Tobesofkee. Extensive tree and power line damage. Two buildings destroyed at Macon State College. Many trees on the campus uprooted or snapped. Several other businesses and campus buildings damaged, including two commercial buildings that were destroyed along Eisenhower Parkway. |
| EF1 | S of Toomsboro | Twiggs, Wilkinson | | 1015 | 25 miles (40 km) | A mobile home was heavily damaged and a church lost its roof along its long track. |
| EF2 | Dublin area | Laurens | 32°37′N 83°01′W | 1036 | 14 miles (22.4 km) | 2 deaths – One mobile home was destroyed, killing two occupants and injuring two others. Six houses were heavily damaged and many sheds and outbuildings were destroyed. |
| EF1 | Wrightsville area | Laurens, Johnson | | 1044 | 10 miles (16 km) | Several houses were damaged and a mobile home was destroyed. 5 people were injured in Johnson County near Wrightsville. |
| EF0 | N of Louisville | Washington, Jefferson, Burke | | 1045 | 33 miles (53 km) | Long track tornado with minor damage to many structures, and damaged many trees. |
| EF1 | N of Lowery | Laurens | | 1058 | 9 miles (15 km) | A mobile home was destroyed and trees were snapped and uprooted. |
| EF2 | Kite area | Johnson, Emanuel | | 1101 | 8 miles (13 km) | Numerous houses were damaged and mobile homes destroyed, primarily along US 221. 3 people were injured in Johnson County inside a destroyed mobile home north of Kite. |
| EF3 | SE of Soperton | Treutlen, Montgomery | | 1111 | 7 miles (11.2 km) | Sheds and outbuildings were destroyed and one home lost its entire second story. |
| EF2 | Normantown | Toombs | | 1120 | 1 miles (1.6 km) | Four mobile homes damaged, one home and one mobile home and one church were destroyed. Sheds and outbuildings were also destroyed. There were three injuries. |
| EF1 | S of Millen | Jenkins | 32°46′N 81°57′W | 1133 | 1.7 miles (2.8 km) | Large wedge tornado; numerous trees and power lines were knocked down on Old West Savannah Road and Highway 25 South. Damage was reported to about 50 houses and two churches, where one person was injured. |
| EF3 | Cobbtown area | Toombs, Emanuel, Candler, Tattnall | 32°28′N 82°14′W | 1135 | 7 miles (11 km) | Homes were damaged, trees and power lines were knocked down, and a convenience store was destroyed near Highway 23 and Highway 25. Two people suffered minor injuries. |
| EF1 | SE of Nevils | Bulloch | 32°16′N 81°45′W | 1210 | 2.25 miles (3.6 km) | A mobile home was destroyed and another was heavily damaged, along with several farm buildings. |
| EF4 | N of Darien | McIntosh | 31°41′N 81°58′W | 1352 | 11 miles (17 km) | Two commercial buildings were blown away, with part of the roof landing on Interstate 95 near milepost 50 and boats thrown up to 650 yards (550 m) away. Nine people were injured inside one of the buildings, but none seriously. Several other businesses were damaged, including a marina which was destroyed. |
| EF1 | Sea Island | Glynn | 31°18′N 81°38′W | 1840 | 2 miles (3.2 km) | Tornado reported in the Sea Palms resort area. Many trees were snapped or uprooted, a few of which fell on buildings. No other building damage reported. |
South Carolina
| EF0 | SE of Johnston | Edgefield | 33°50′N 81°49′W | 0809 | unknown | Tornado reported between Edgefield and Johnston. Damage limited to trees and power lines. |
| EF0 | NE of Baynham | Aiken | | 0831 | 3 miles (4.8 km) | No damage reported |
| EF0 | SE of Ridge Spring | Aiken | 33°48′N 81°37′W | 0928 | unknown | Damage limited to trees |
| EF0 | WNW of Wagener | Aiken | 33°42′N 81°29′W | 1007 | 8 miles (12.8 km) | Weak tornado damaged a few trees. |
| EF0 | SE of Varnville | Hampton | | 1230 | unknown | Weak tornado with no damage |
| EF2 | SW of Charleston | Charleston | 32°43′N 80°14′W | 2210 | 12 miles (20 km) | Large wedge tornado crossed Wadmalaw Island, Johns Island and James Island. The heaviest damage was on Wadmalaw Island, but damage was reported on all three islands. |
Indiana
| EF0 | S of Markleville | Madison | | 1225 | unknown | A trailer was carried away, one home had roof damage and numerous trees were damaged |
Kentucky
| EF1 | Cumberland Falls State Park | McCreary, Whitley | 36°50′N 84°20′W | 1310 | 1.5 miles (2.4 km) | Many trees were knocked down in the park, one of which fell on a park ranger station. |
| EF1 | Grahn Fork | Carter | | 1420 | 1.2 miles (2 km) | Several houses suffered structural damage, and a mobile home lost its roof. |
| EF1 | E of Wooton | Leslie | 37°18′N 83°29′W | 1427 | 200 yds (180 m) | Heavy tree and power line damage as a result of a tornado in the area. |
Ohio
| EF0 | NE of West Jefferson | Madison, Franklin | 40°01′N 83°28′W | 1710 | 300 yds (270 m) | Tornado reported according to CNN coverage. Narrow line of damage along Highway 142 with damage mainly to trees. |
North Carolina
| EF0 | SE of Morganton | Burke | | 2030 | unknown | Damage limited to trees |
| EF0 | NE of Cat Square | Lincoln | | 2048 | unknown | Brief touchdown in an open field |
| EF0 | SE of Kirkland | New Hanover | | 2203 | unknown | No damage reported |
| EF0 | E of West Concord | Cabarrus | | 2219 | unknown | Brief touchdown |
| EF2 | NW of Lewiston to NW of Cremo | Bertie | 36°14′N 77°19′W | 2225 | 15 miles (24 km) | Tornado damaged several houses and destroyed some mobile homes and a church. Numerous trees knocked down. Two people were injured |
| EF2 | SE of Maysville | Onslow, Jones | | 2257 | 5 miles (8 km) | Outbuildings were destroyed and several homes were heavily damaged. 6 people were injured. |
| EF0 | NW of Morton Fork | Onslow | | 2328 | unknown | No damage reported |
| EF1 | Morehead City | Carteret | 34°44′N 76°44′W | 0006 | 3 miles (4.8 km) | Brief tornado knocked down some trees and flipped a trampoline. Minor damage to businesses also reported. |
| EF0 | SW of Crab Point | Carteret | | 0017 | unknown | Brief waterspout that moved onshore |
| EF1 | N of Beaufort | Carteret | | 0027 | unknown | Brief tornado touchdown |
Sources: Storms Reports for May 11, 2008, NWS Peachtree City, NWS Wilmington, OH, NWS Jackson, KY, NWS Jacksonville, NWS Columbia, NWS Wakefield, NWS Newport/Morehead City, NWS Charleston, SC, NWS Charleston, WV

=== May 13 event ===
List of confirmed tornadoes – Tuesday, May 13, 2008
| EF# | Location | County / Parish | State | Coord. | Time (UTC) | Path length | Max width | Summary |
|---|---|---|---|---|---|---|---|---|
| EF0 | SE of Mindenmines | Barton | MD | 37.47°N 94.59°W | 01:27–01:28 | 0.03 mi (0.048 km) | 20 yd (18 m) | Trained spotters observed a brief tornado near a surface mining pit; no damage occurred. |

=== May 14 event ===
List of confirmed tornadoes – Wednesday, May 14, 2008
| EF# | Location | County / Parish | State | Coord. | Time (UTC) | Path length | Max width | Summary |
|---|---|---|---|---|---|---|---|---|
| EF0 | SE of Burnet | Burnet | TX | 30.7241°N 98.2009°W | 10:10–10:12 | 0.25 mi (0.40 km) | 30 yd (27 m) | A brief tornado tracked through predominantly wooded areas, damaging numerous trees. One mobile home had minor damage from airborne debris. |
| EF1 | ESE of Pleasant Grove | Rusk | TX | 32.008°N 94.924°W | 14:30–14:40 | 4.26 mi (6.86 km) | 300 yd (270 m) | West of County Road 1798, a manufactured home was lifted from its foundation when wind got underneath it and thrown back down resulting in its destruction. Debris was strewn up to 3 mi (4.8 km) away. Farther along the tornado's path, a barn, shed, and outbuilding were destroyed or severely damaged. Numerous trees and power poles were snapped or uprooted. |
| EF0 | NE of Denver City | Yoakum | TX | 33.0593°N 102.6487°W | 20:15–20:16 | 1.91 mi (3.07 km) | 75 yd (69 m) | Motorists reported a tornado from U.S. Highway 82/380. While no damage was observed, Doppler radar imagery corroborated that a tornado likely occurred. |
| EF0 | N of Lubbock | Lubbock | TX | 33.6148°N 101.8428°W | 21:02–21:03 | 0.23 mi (0.37 km) | 100 yd (91 m) | A brief tornado severely damaged the roof of a metal warehouse and shattered car windows. |
| EF0 | W of Westbrook | Mitchell | TX | 32.35°N 101.0714°W | 22:05–22:10 | 2.11 mi (3.40 km) | 50 yd (46 m) | Local law enforcement observed a tornado over open fields. |
| EF0 | W of Edleona | Nolan | TX | 32.33°N 100.54°W | 22:35–22:38 | 0.1 mi (0.16 km) | 50 yd (46 m) | A trained spotter reported a brief tornado. |
| EF0 | S of Sweetwater | Nolan | TX | 32.34°N 100.4°W | 22:53–22:55 | 0.1 mi (0.16 km) | 50 yd (46 m) | A storm spotter reported a brief tornado. |
| EF0 | N of Melvin | McCulloch | TX | 31.2°N 99.58°W | 23:07–23:10 | 0.1 mi (0.16 km) | 50 yd (46 m) | A brief tornado was reported just outside the city limits of Melvin. |
| EF0 | W of Brady | McCulloch | TX | 31.126°N 99.397°W | 23:16–23:19 | 1.01 mi (1.63 km) | 85 yd (78 m) | A brief tornado tracked along the southeast shores of the Brady Creek Reservoir. Storage buildings, a marina, and many trees were damaged. |
| EF0 | SW of Lampasas | Burnet | TX | 31.0022°N 98.2101°W | 01:25 | 0.1 mi (0.16 km) | 10 yd (9.1 m) | A brief tornado uprooted trees. |
| EF0 | SW of Dublin | Erath | TX | 32.0589°N 98.3611°W | 01:30–01:31 | 0.25 mi (0.40 km) | 30 yd (27 m) | A storm spotter observed a brief tornado. |
| EF1 | NW of Winnsboro | Franklin | TX | 32.972°N 95.307°W | 05:50–06:00 | 3.21 mi (5.17 km) | 100 yd (91 m) | A bookend tornado formed along the north side of a straight-line wind event, impacting the north side of Winnsboro. One mobile home sustained minor damage. |

=== May 15 event ===
List of confirmed tornadoes – Thursday, May 15, 2008
| EF# | Location | County / Parish | State | Coord. | Time (UTC) | Path length | Max width | Summary |
|---|---|---|---|---|---|---|---|---|
| EF0 | SE of Buna | Jasper | TX | 30.4077°N 93.9324°W | 09:00–09:10 | 0.25 mi (0.40 km) | 25 yd (23 m) | A brief tornado downed trees and tore the roof from a barn. |
| EF1 | WSW of Deridder | Beauregard | LA | 30.812°N 93.4152°W | 09:15–09:22 | 4.92 mi (7.92 km) | 50 yd (46 m) | A tied-down mobile home was destroyed, a barn lost its roof, and one home had shingles blown off. Two people suffered minor injuries. Multiple trees were downed along the tornado's path. |
| EF0 | S of Deridder | Beauregard | LA | 30.7526°N 93.2425°W | 09:25–09:26 | 0.29 mi (0.47 km) | 25 yd (23 m) | A brief tornado uprooted trees. |
| EF0 | SW of Gueydan | Vermilion | LA | 29.967°N 92.5827°W | 11:12–11:13 | 0.27 mi (0.43 km) | 25 yd (23 m) | A brief tornado destroyed a barn and uprooted trees. |
| EF2 | N of Leroy to SW of Lafayette | Vermilion, Lafayette | LA | 30.1009°N 92.184°W | 11:15–11:28 | 7.6 mi (12.2 km) | 200 yd (180 m) | In Vermilion Parish, a mobile home was destroyed and another was shifted from its block foundation. After moving into Lafayette Parish, the tornado intensified and severely damaged a permanent home. The structure had its roof torn off and thrown into a neighboring home, causing significant damage to that structure. Several other homes suffered minor damage. Many trees were snapped or uprooted. |
| EF0 | Southwestern Lafayette | Lafayette | LA | 30.16°N 92.05°W | 11:35–11:36 | 0.69 mi (1.11 km) | 25 yd (23 m) | A brief tornado downed trees and blew shingles off the roofs of a few homes. |
| EF0 | SW of Abbeville | Vermilion | LA | 29.8878°N 92.2156°W | 11:35–11:41 | 5.55 mi (8.93 km) | 50 yd (46 m) | A brief tornado downed trees and a few homes sustained minor damage |
| EF1 | Downtown Lafayette | Lafayette | LA | 30.201°N 92.0176°W | 11:40–11:42 | 0.85 mi (1.37 km) | 100 yd (91 m) | A tornado touched down in the Oil Center District of Lafayette, causing significant damage to the roofs of buildings in the Ochsner Lafayette General Medical Center. Debris from these structures impacted nearby buildings, breaking many windows. Many trees were downed, some of which fell on cars. Total damage reached an estimated $3 million. |
| EF1 | Breaux Bridge | St. Martin | LA | 30.2964°N 91.909°W | 11:55–12:00 | 3.79 mi (6.10 km) | 50 yd (46 m) | A tornado touched down just north of Beaux Bridge (just northeast of Lafayette) and moved south through the city. Several large warehouses were damaged near a Wal-Mart. After crossing Highway 94, the tornado destroyed a business and caused damage to homes and an apartment complex as it tracked across Beaux Bridge. Near its dissipation point, a home was shifted from its foundation, injuring the sole occupant. Total damage reached an estimated $1.5 million. |
| EF1 | SW of Folsom | St. Tammany | LA | 30.6044°N 90.2297°W | 14:00–14:12 | 5.02 mi (8.08 km) | 75 yd (69 m) | A large metal building was severely damaged while several other structures had minor roof damage. Many trees were snapped or uprooted. |
| EF1 | ENE of Enon | Washington | LA | 30.7422°N 90.0178°W | 14:20–14:26 | 2.5 mi (4.0 km) | 100 yd (91 m) | This tornado occurred within a broader region of straight-line winds. Damage was primarily confined to large trees being snapped in half, though one structure was heavily damaged. |
| EF1 | ESE of Purvis to Camp Shelby | Lamar, Forrest | MS | 31.1438°N 89.4009°W | 15:05–15:24 | 15.43 mi (24.83 km) | 600 yd (550 m) | This longer tracked tornado touched down near Interstate 59, tracked toward U.S. Route 49, and subsequently dissipated near Camp Shelby. Many trees were snapped or uprooted in the touchdown area, with homes and outbuildings damaged by the falling debris. One mobile home was destroyed by a fallen tree. Within Camp Shelby, trees downed by the tornado fell onto base structures and vehicles. Total damage reached an estimated $1.21 million. |
| EF1 | W of Camp Shelby | Forrest | MS | 31.15°N 89.28°W | 15:15–15:17 | 1.3 mi (2.1 km) | 150 yd (140 m) | This tornado existed simultaneously with the preceding Camp Shelby tornado, tracking just to its south. Damage was primarily limited to downed trees, with only one church suffering roof damage. |
| EF0 | WNW of Paul to ENE of South | Conecuh, Covington | AL | 31.3255°N 86.7654°W | 17:17–17:38 | 14.96 mi (24.08 km) | 100 yd (91 m) | This weak tornado tracked through predominantly rural areas of Conecuh County, with damaged limited to trees. Within Covington County, the tornado damaged a home near Red Level and four others near South. A volunteer fire department was damaged in the latter community. |

=== May 17 event ===
List of confirmed tornadoes – Saturday, May 17, 2008
| EF# | Location | County / Parish | State | Coord. | Time (UTC) | Path length | Max width | Summary |
|---|---|---|---|---|---|---|---|---|
| EF0 | NW of Camden | Oneida | NY | 43.353°N 75.7774°W | 22:50–22:52 | 0.58 mi (0.93 km) | 250 yd (230 m) | A brief tornado touched down near the Fish Creek, where it caused a barn to collapse. A nearby home had siding ripped off and large branches were broken off trees. A trailer on the property was thrown 20 to 25 ft (6.1 to 7.6 m) and debris was scattered up to 0.5 mi (0.80 km) away. |

=== May 18 event ===
List of confirmed tornadoes – Sunday, May 18, 2008
| EF# | Location | County / Parish | State | Coord. | Time (UTC) | Path length | Max width | Summary |
|---|---|---|---|---|---|---|---|---|
| EF0 | SE of Benton Springs | Polk | TN | 35.13°N 84.6°W | 00:25 | 2.1 mi (3.4 km) | 25 yd (23 m) | A weak tornado damaged trees within the Cherokee National Forest. |

=== May 20 event ===
List of confirmed tornadoes – Tuesday, May 20, 2008
| EF# | Location | County / Parish | State | Coord. | Time (UTC) | Path length | Max width | Summary |
|---|---|---|---|---|---|---|---|---|
| EF1 | S of Govan to NE of Ehrhardt | Bamberg | SC | 33.2°N 81.184°W | 21:07–21:20 | 13.29 mi (21.39 km) | 800 yd (730 m) | This large tornado caused notable damage to three homes and two mobile homes and destroyed an outbuilding. Numerous trees and a few power lines were downed along its path. |
| EF0 | NNW of Collinsville | DeKalb | AL | 34.2817°N 85.8782°W | 21:48–21:50 | 0.21 mi (0.34 km) | 20 yd (18 m) | A brief tornado snapped multiple trees and left convergent grass patterns along its path. |
| EF0 | NW of Davisboro | Washington | GA | 32.9954°N 82.6183°W | 22:20–22:21 | 1 mi (1.6 km) | 50 yd (46 m) | A brief tornado downed multiple trees. |
| EF1 | Lebanon | Cherokee | GA | 34.1465°N 84.5173°W | 22:35–22:42 | 5.87 mi (9.45 km) | 1,760 yd (1,610 m) | 1 indirect death – A very large tornado touched down in and tracked through the city of Lebanon, causing extensive damage. The Falton Lakes Mobile Home Park was particularly hard-hit. Throughout the tornadoes path, 60 homes were destroyed (35 site-built and 25 mobile) while 1,014 other homes suffered damage (391 of which were major). Twenty school district buildings and ten businesses were also damaged. Total damage from the tornado reached $46 million. More than a week after the tornado, two trees damaged by the storm fell on cars, killing one person and injuring another. Georgia Governor Sonny Perdue declared a state of emergency for Cherokee County following the tornado. Perdue made an appeal for federal aid to FEMA on May 28; however, it was denied on July 23. |
| EF0 | ENE of Vidette to SW of Waynesboro | Burke | GA | 33.036°N 82.23°W | 23:41–23:55 | 10.43 mi (16.79 km) | 600 yd (550 m) | A weak tornado damaged many trees and a few power lines along its path. Fallen trees caused damage to an outbuilding and an abandoned church. |
| EF0 | WSW of Eureka | Hancock, Washington | GA | 33.1777°N 82.873°W | 01:00–01:08 | 4.83 mi (7.77 km) | 125 yd (114 m) | This tornado tracked through predominantly rural areas, leaving behind damage to only one barn and hundreds of trees damaged hundreds of trees. |

=== May 22 to May 27 events ===
A total of 173 tornadoes were confirmed during this multi-day tornado outbreak. Three of the tornadoes touched down in Canada.

=== May 28 event ===
List of confirmed tornadoes – Friday, May 28, 2008
| EF# | Location | County / Parish | State | Start Coord. | Time (UTC) | Path length | Max width | Summary |
|---|---|---|---|---|---|---|---|---|
| EF0 | Dubois | Fremont | WY | 43.5344°N 109.6311°W | 21:08–21:09 | 0.04 mi (0.064 km) | 10 yd (9.1 m) | Brief tornado blew the roof off of a restroom facility in town and snapped a sign support pole. A window at a nearby residence was shattered by flying debris, causing minor injuries to a woman inside. |
| EF0 | N of Sunset | Lincoln | NM | 33.39°N 105.06°W | 22:45–22:46 | 0.17 mi (0.27 km) | 15 yd (14 m) | Tornado remained over open country, causing no damage. |
| EF0 | N of Tecolotitio | San Miguel | NM | 35.29°N 105.18°W | 23:45–23:46 | 0.56 mi (0.90 km) | 100 yd (91 m) | Tornado remained over open country, causing no damage. |
| EF0 | N of Tucumcari | San Miguel | NM | 35.30°N 103.73°W | 00:27–00:28 | 0.18 mi (0.29 km) | 25 yd (23 m) | Brief tornado remained over open country, causing no damage. |

=== May 29 event ===
List of reported tornadoes – Thursday, May 29, 2008
| EF# | Location | County | Coord. | Time (UTC) | Path length | Damage |
Wyoming
| EF0 | NE of Thermopolis | Hot Springs | 43.75°N 108.07°W | 1834 | unknown | Tornado remained over open country, causing no damage. |
| EF0 | SE of Buffalo | Johnson | 44.23°N 106.34°W | 2125 | unknown | Tornado remained over open country, causing no damage. |
Kansas
| EF0 | E of Hoxie | Sheridan | 39.36°N 100.35°W | 2140 | 4 miles (6.4 km) | Narrow tornado remained over open country, causing no damage. |
| EF0 | S of Hoxie | Sheridan | 39.22°N 100.44°W | 2245 | 1 mile (1.6 km) | Rain-wrapped tornado remained over open country, causing no damage. |
| EF1 | S of Palco | Rooks | 39.25°N 99.60°W | 2302 | 2 miles (3.2 km) | Tornado struck four farmsteads, with damage to outbuildings, garages, and trees. A wood-frame metal building was completely destroyed. |
| EF1 | Woodston | Rooks | 39.45°N 99.10°W | 2336 | unknown | Brief tornado moved through town, with a brick building and a nearby house sustaining the heaviest damage. |
| EF0 | NW of Zurich | Rooks | 39.25°N 99.33°W | 0005 | unknown | Brief tornado damaged a few power poles. |
| EF0 | E of Zurich | Rooks | | 0009 | unknown | Brief tornado snapped a few power poles. |
| EF1 | S of Downs to N of Tipton | Osborne, Mitchell | 39.43°N 98.55°W | 0116 | 16 miles (25.6 km) | Tornado damaged trees and power poles along its path, and eventually merged with the larger, more powerful Glen Elder/Jewell EF3. |
| EF3 | SW of Glen Elder to N of Jewell | Mitchell, Jewell | 39.63°N 98.15°W | 0130 | 18 miles (29 km) | Near Glen Elder, this large multiple-vortex tornado produced EF2 damage, heavily damaging farmsteads and snapping trees and power poles. Additional farmsteads sustained major damage further to the northeast before the tornado reached EF3 strength and struck the west side of Jewell. A cafe, a trucking company, and several homes in town were destroyed, and the town's water tower was toppled to the ground. Trees in town were stripped, several large metal buildings were destroyed, vehicles were tossed, and several railroad cars were blown over as well. The tornado dissipated just north of Jewell. |
| EF0 | SW of Randall | Mitchell, Jewell | | 0158 | 10 miles (16 km) | Tornado caused minor damage to trees, power poles, and wheat fields. |
| EF3 | SW of Formoso to N of Fairbury, NE | Jewell, Republic, Thayer (NE), Jefferson (NE) | 39.72°N 97.89°W | 0234 | 54 miles (86.4 km) | Strong, long-tracked wedge tornado initially remained over open country before passing near Courtland at EF3 strength, where power poles were snapped, trees were ripped out of the ground and thrown, headstones were toppled at a cemetery, barns, grains bins, and outbuildings were destroyed, an old schoolhouse was destroyed, and an old stone house was destroyed as well. Several other homes sustained moderate to major damage. The tornado crossed into Nebraska and produced EF1 damage near Hubell, damaging grain bins, trees, and power poles. A few homes and outbuildings sustained roof damage as well. Additional power pole and outbuilding damage occurred further along the path before the tornado re-strengthened to EF2 intensity near Fairbury, where a garage was destroyed, a house had its roof torn off, a large barn was destroyed, several hangars were destroyed at the Fairbury Airport, and several large trees were snapped before the tornado dissipated. |
Nebraska
| EF0 | E of Stockville | Frontier | | 2050 | unknown | Brief tornado remained over open country, causing no damage. |
| EF0 | W of Elwood | Gosper | | 2110 | 6 miles (9.6 km) | Brief tornado remained over open country, causing no damage. |
| EF0 | NE of Smithfield to NE of Westmark | Gosper, Phelps | | 2132 | 21 miles (33.6 km) | Tornado remained over open country, causing no damage. |
| EF2 | N of Funk to S of Kearney | Phelps, Buffalo | 40.66°N 99.26°W | 2216 | 14 miles (23 km) | Near Funk, this tornado caused major damage to outbuildings and grain silos. The tornado weakened to EF0 strength as passed south of Kearny, damaging a billboard, irrigation piping, trees, and power poles. |
| EF1 | W of Kearney to Shelton | Buffalo | | 2220 | 26 miles (41.6 km) | Multiple-vortex tornado began west of Kearney, blowing numerous empty coal train cars off the tracks. The tornado moved directly through downtown Kearney, toppling numerous trees and tree limbs onto homes, businesses, and vehicles, and causing widespread roof and siding damage. Signs and power lines were downed, and empty grain bins were displaced as well. The tornado caused tree damage in the towns of Gibbon and Shelton before dissipating. |
| EF2 | W of Kearney to NE of Wood River | Buffalo, Hall | 40.70°N 99.12°W | 2226 | 30 miles (48 km) | Large rain-wrapped tornado caused significant damage in Kearney, including at the University of Nebraska at Kearney campus. An apartment building sustained major damage, losing much of its roof along with a wall, and cars in the parking lot were thrown into a pile. Extensive tree damage occurred at Harmon Park, and a building near the hospital had its roof torn off. The local fairgrounds sustained major damage, and the Expo Center building partially collapsed. A hangar was completely destroyed and collapsed onto a private jet at the local airport as well. The tornado weakened as it continued through rural areas east of town, causing relatively minor roof, grain bin, power pole, tree, and outbuilding damage before dissipating. |
| EF0 | W of Grand Island | Hamilton | | 2352 | 4 miles (6.4 km) | Power lines and trees were damaged. |
| EF2 | S of Aurora | Hamilton | 40.87°N 98.06°W | 0002 | 9 miles (14.4 km) | Large wedge tornado damaged several homes, some heavily. A cell tower was toppled to the ground, empty railroad cars were blown off the tracks, and high-voltage power lines were downed. Many power poles and irrigation sprinklers were blown over as well. |
| EF0 | E of Thayer | York | | 0044 | 4 miles (6.4 km) | tornado damaged trees and irrigation sprinklers. |
| EF1 | E of Winslow | Washington | 41.61°N 96.43°W | 0055 | 2 miles (3.2 km) | Narrow tornado damaged trees and destroyed half of a machine shed. Outbuildings were damaged at a church as well. |
| EF0 | E of Beaver Crossing | Seward | 40.78°N 97.22°W | 0100 | unknown | Brief tornado remained over mostly open country. A hay shed was flipped onto a neighboring shed at a dairy farm near the tornado's path, though it was unclear if this was a result of the tornado or straight-line winds that occurred later that evening. |
| EF1 | E of Herman | Washington | 41.67°N 96.14°W | 0115 | 1 mile (1.6 km) | Tornado flipped irrigation sprinklers, snapped power poles, and destroyed a shed. |
| EF2 | SE of Pickrell to NE of Filley | Gage | unknown | unknown | 10.81 miles (1.6 km) | Tornado embedded in a squall line heavily damaged two homes and multiple outbuildings near the beginning of the path. A church was damaged and trees were snapped and uprooted as well. Less intense tree, house, and outbuilding damage occurred at 10 other farmsteads further east before the tornado dissipated. |
South Dakota
| EF0 | E of Kingsburg | Bon Homme | 42.90°N 97.85°W | 2313 | unknown | Brief tornado remained over open country, causing no damage. |
| EF0 | W of Talmo | Yankton | 43.02°N 97.23°W | 0005 | unknown | Brief tornado remained over open country, causing no damage. |
| EF1 | NW of Wakonda | Clay | 43.03°N 97.15°W | 0010 | 2 miles (3.2 km) | Tornado caused widespread tree damage and littered roads with tree debris. |
| EF1 | NE of Wakonda | Clay | 43.06°N 97.08°W | 0017 | 2 miles (3.2 km) | Tornado struck a farmstead, where a barn was destroyed and outbuildings were damaged, with lumber scattered across a nearby field. Trees and power lines were also damaged. |
Iowa
| EF1 | SW of Moorhead | Monona | 41.89°N 95.89°W | 0100 | 3.5 miles (5.6 km) | Tornado damaged several groves of trees, including one where a large 3-foot in diameter tree was snapped off at the base. House and outbuilding damage occurred, and a chicken coop was damaged as well. |
| EF0 | SW of Dow City | Crawford | 41.92°N 95.51°W | 0137 | 1 mile (1.6 km) | A farmhouse had shingles peeled off and windows blown out. Nearby trees were damaged as well. |
| EF1 | E of Denison | Crawford | 42.02°N 95.35°W | 0146 | 3 miles (4.8 km) | Tornado tore the roof off of a barn, tore shingles from the roof of a house, and downed numerous trees. A hog confinement building was leveled, and trailers were damaged at a trailer park. |
| EF1 | SE of Templeton | Carroll | 41.91°N 94.91°W | 0210 | 4 miles (6.4 km) | Tornado struck three farmsteads, with outbuildings damaged and a large machine shed destroyed. Tree damage occurred along the path as well. |
| EF1 | Northern Somers | Calhoun | 42.39°N 94.43°W | 0223 | 3 miles (4.8 km) | Tornado struck the north side of town, damaging homes and garages. |
| EF0 | W of Farnhamville | Calhoun | 42.28°N 94.42°W | 0225 | 2 miles (3.2 km) | Tornado struck four farmsteads, causing minor tree and house damage. |
| EF0 | SW of Gardiner | Dallas | 41.76°N 94.07°W | 0406 | unknown | Brief tornado remained over open country, causing no damage. |
| EF1 | NW of Adel | Dallas | 41.62°N 94.04°W | 0550 | 4 miles (6.4 km) | Several farm outbuildings were damaged or destroyed by this tornado. Tree and power line damage occurred as well. |
Sources: SPC Storm Reports for May 29, 2008, NWS Hastings #1, NWS Hastings #2, NWS Sioux Falls, NWS Omaha #1, NWS Omaha #2, NWS Topeka

=== May 30 event ===
List of reported tornadoes - Friday, May 30, 2008
| EF# | Location | County | Coord. | Time (UTC) | Path length | Damage |
Iowa
| EF1 | NE of Murray | Clarke | | 0913 | 9.1 miles (15 km) | Outbuildings, power lines, an trees were damaged. |
| EF1 | S of Lacona to S of Melcher | Warren, Marion | 41.19°N 93.38°W | 0951 | 7.8 miles (12 km) | Tornado caused damage to farm buildings, trees, and power lines. |
| EF2 | NE of Columbia to W of Beacon | Marion, Mahaska | | 1007 | 18 miles (29 km) | Worst damage occurred near Attica, where several frame homes were heavily damaged or destroyed, and two mobile homes were destroyed. 10 people were injured. |
Indiana
| EF1 | S of Wabash | Wabash | 40.78°N 85.83°W | 2215 | 0.2 mile (320 m) | Two barns were heavily damaged, and 12 power poles were snapped or pushed over. Two people sustained minor injuries in one of the barns. |
| EF0 | SW of Dora | Wabash | | 2222 | unknown | A barn was damaged and spattered with mud, and a few trees were downed. |
| EF0 | NE of Pyrmont | Carroll | 40.48°N 86.67°W | 2330 | unknown | A few trees were damaged in a field. |
| EF2 | NE of Lawrence to NE of Gem | Marion | 39.83°N 86.08°W | 0227 | 2.5 miles (4 km) | Tornado struck residential areas of eastern Indianapolis. An apartment complex sustained major damage. Trees, power lines, and several homes were damaged as well. Barns were also damaged or destroyed towards the end of the path. 18 people were injured. |
| EF1 | SE of Fortville | Hancock | | 0235 | 4.5 miles (7.2 km) | Homes and farm buildings were damaged. |
| EF0 | NE of Rivare to NW of Wren, OH | Adams, Van Wert (OH) | 40.97°N 84.61°W | 0400 | unknown | In Indiana, several trees were downed and a shed sustained shingle damage. In Ohio, a barn had its steel doors destroyed. |
Missouri
| EF1 | N of Ewing | Lewis | | 2210 | 3 miles (4.8 km) | Several machine sheds were destroyed along the path, with debris scattered up to 200 yards away and boards driven into the ground. Power poles were snapped, a grain bin was damaged, and tree damage occurred as well. |
| EF0 | S of Center | Ralls | 39.50°N 91.53°W | 2215 | 3 miles (4.8 km) | Power poles were bent over, tree damage occurred, and a machine shed and a modular home were damaged. A mobile home was flipped onto its side as well. |
Illinois
| EF1 | SW of Summer Hill | Pike | 39.54°N 90.94°W | 2125 | 1 mile (1.6 km) | A large machine shed was destroyed with debris scattered up to a half-mile away. Trees were damaged as well. |
| EF0 | SE of Pittsfield | Pike | | 2315 | 4 mile (6.4 km) | Damage was limited to trees. |
| EF1 | W of Waverly to NW of Lowder | Morgan, Sangamon | 39.59°N 89.95°W | 0017 | 5.6 miles (9 km) | Near Waverly, this tornado snapped trees and damaged homes. Pole barns, grain bins, sheds, and garages were destroyed. Near Lowder, the tornado snapped trees and power poles, and damaged a house. Additional outbuildings were destroyed before the tornado dissipated. |
| EF0 | S of Taylorville | Christian | 39.51°N 89.26°W | 0120 | unknown | Brief tornado remained over open country, causing no damage. |
| EF0 | NE of Westervelt | Shelby | 39.50°N 88.83°W | 0133 | 1 mile (1.6 km) | Tornado remained over open country, causing no damage. |
Ohio
| EF1 | N of Glandorf | Putnam | 41.05°N 84.11°W | 0428 | 3 miles (4.8 km) | High-end EF1 damaged multiple homes, a few of which had their roofs blown off. Several outbuildings were destroyed, and numerous pieces of farm equipment and 11 vehicles were damaged or destroyed as well. |
| EF2 | SW of Arcadia to Southern Fostoria | Hancock, Seneca | 40.89°N 83.65°W | 0529 | 8 miles (13 km) | Near Arcadia, the tornado damaged numerous properties with two homes and many outbuildings destroyed, and other homes heavily damaged. Hundreds of trees were snapped and uprooted along the path. The tornado struck the south side of Fostoria before dissipating, where several homes were damaged and one was destroyed. Much of the damage in town was from falling trees and tree limbs. 6 people were injured. |
Minnesota
| EF0 | NW of Morris | Stevens | unknown | unknown | .5 miles (4.8 km) | Tornado remained over open country, causing no damage. |
Sources: SPC Storm Reports for May 30, 2008, NWS Indianapolis, NWS Central Illinois, NWS Cleveland, NWS St. Louis

=== May 31 event ===
List of reported tornadoes - Saturday, May 31, 2008
| EF# | Location | County | Coord. | Time (UTC) | Path length | Damage |
West Virginia
| EF0 | NNE of Terra Alta | Preston | | 1230 | 0.5 miles (800 m) | Brief touchdown. Many trees were snapped or toppled, two homes sustained damage, a mobile home was pushed off of its foundation, and one person was injured by flying glass. |
Virginia
| EF0 | Etna Mills | King William | 37.77°N 77.27°W | 2052 | unknown | Shingles were torn from homes and windows were blown out. An empty silo was blown over and numerous trees were snapped and uprooted. |
Oklahoma
| EF0 | N of Pawhuska | Osage | 36.67°N 96.34°W | 0007 | unknown | Tornado remained over open country, causing no damage. |
Sources: SPC Storm Reports for May 31, 2008, NWS Pittsburgh NWS Wakefield

== See also ==
- Tornadoes of 2008
