= Descending reflectivity core =

Small-scale area of enhanced radar reflectivity

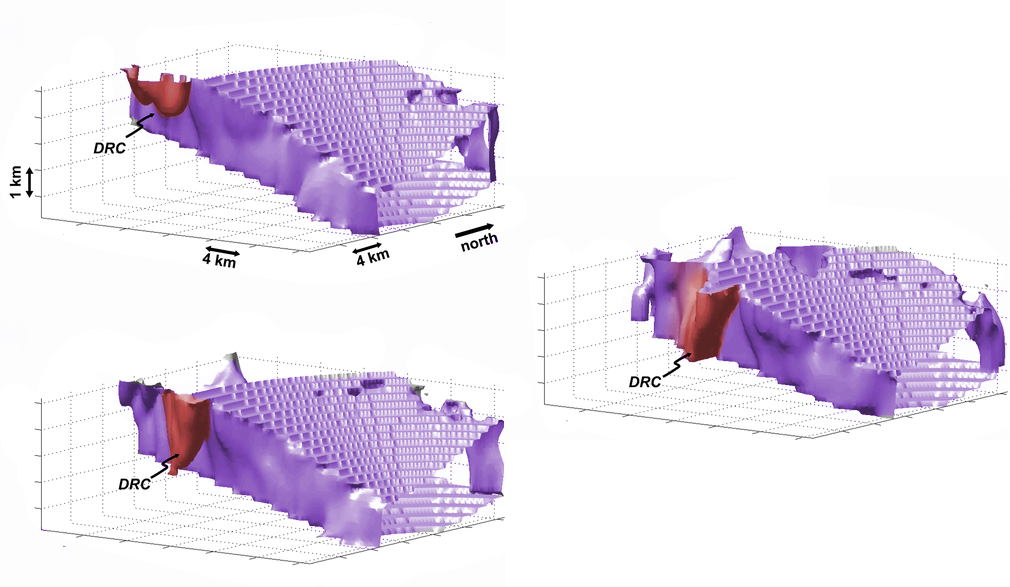
- Visualization of a descending reflectivity core during the May, 2000 Tornado Outbreak.
- Effect: tornadogenesis, updraft intensification, mesocyclone formation

A descending reflectivity core (DRC), sometimes referred to as a blob, is a meteorological phenomenon observed in supercell thunderstorms, characterized by a localized, small-scale area of enhanced radar reflectivity that descends from the echo overhang into the lower levels of the storm. Typically found on the right rear flank of supercells, DRCs are significant for their potential role in the development or intensification of low-level rotation within these storms. The descent of DRCs has been associated with the formation and evolution of hook echoes, a key radar signature of supercells, suggesting a complex interplay between these cores and storm dynamics.

First identified and studied through mobile Doppler radar observations, DRCs offer a higher resolution perspective than traditional operational radars, enabling a detailed examination of their structure and behavior. However, these observations often lack a broader, larger-scale view, limiting insights into the origin of DRCs and their relationship with other storm features. Advances in three-dimensional numerical simulations have furthered understanding of DRCs, shedding light on their formation mechanisms, their interaction with the storm's wind field, and the accompanying thermodynamic environment.

Despite their prominence in research, DRCs present challenges in operational meteorology, particularly in forecasting tornado development. The variability in the relationship between DRC observations and changes in the storm's low-level wind field has resulted in mixed results regarding their predictive value for tornadogenesis.

== Observation and analysis ==
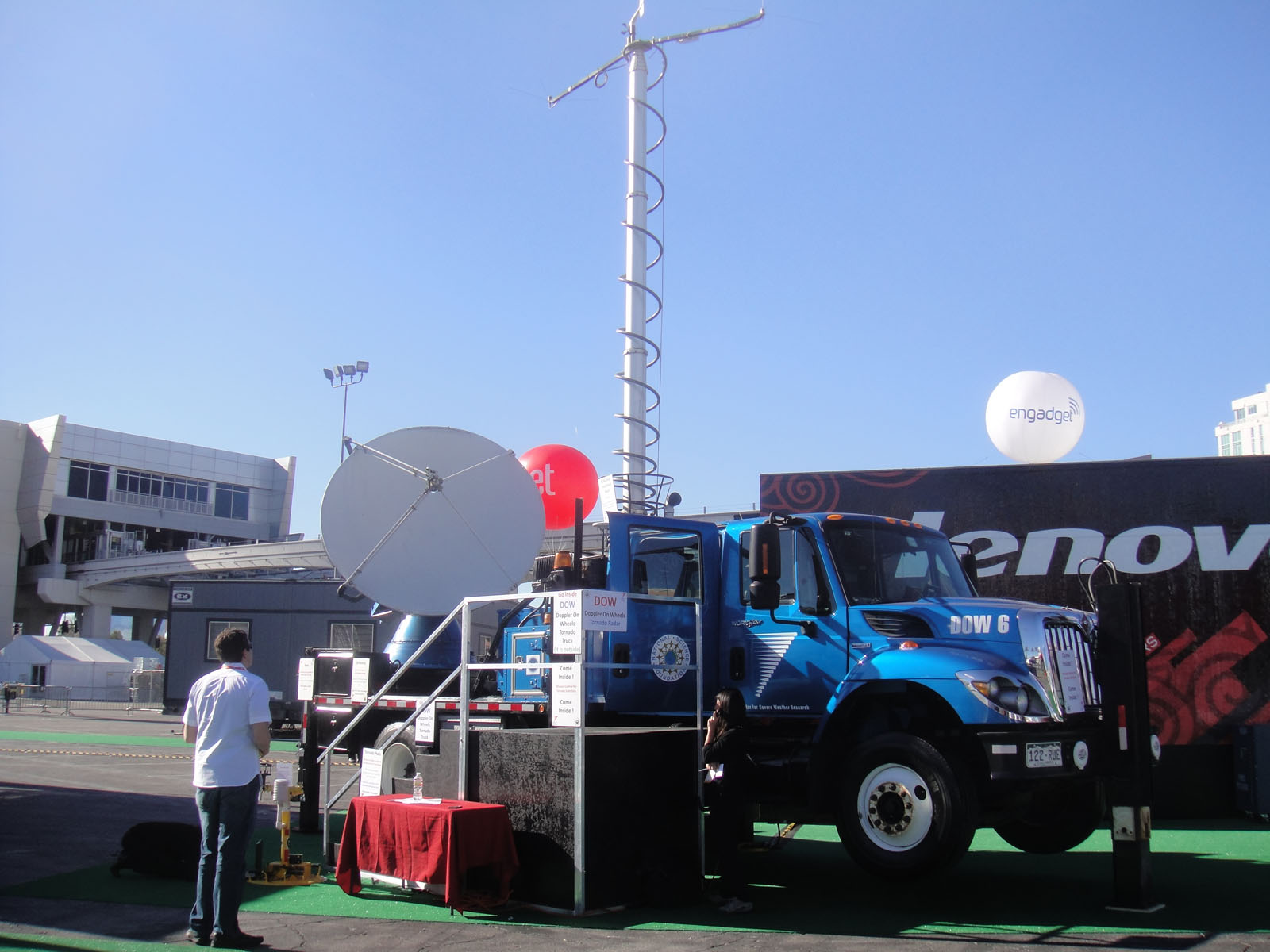
Doppler On Wheels (DOW) radar. Used for micro-scale and near-surface based analysis of the atmosphere

The concept of DRCs builds on the understanding of hook echoes, first documented in the 1950s. These hook echoes were initially hypothesized to form from the advection of precipitation around a supercell's rotating updraft. However, subsequent studies suggested alternative formation mechanisms, including the descent of precipitation cores from higher levels. DRCs have been observed using mobile doppler radar, offering higher resolution than operational radars but sometimes sacrificing larger-scale perspective. These observations have revealed the challenge in generalizing a relationship between DRCs and subsequent low-level wind field evolution. Studies using three-dimensional numerical simulations of supercells have also provided insights into DRC formation mechanisms and their interactions with three-dimensional wind fields.

Recent studies have identified different mechanisms for DRC development, not all of which lead to increases in low-level rotation. This variability might account for the difficulty in using DRC detection to aid operational forecasting of tornadogenesis. One significant study documented DRCs using Doppler on Wheels (DOW) radar data, revealing finer spatial resolution details in DRC evolution. The study presented cases where DRCs appeared as new convective cells, merging with the main echo region of storms, and influencing the formation of hook echoes.

== Mechanism and formation ==
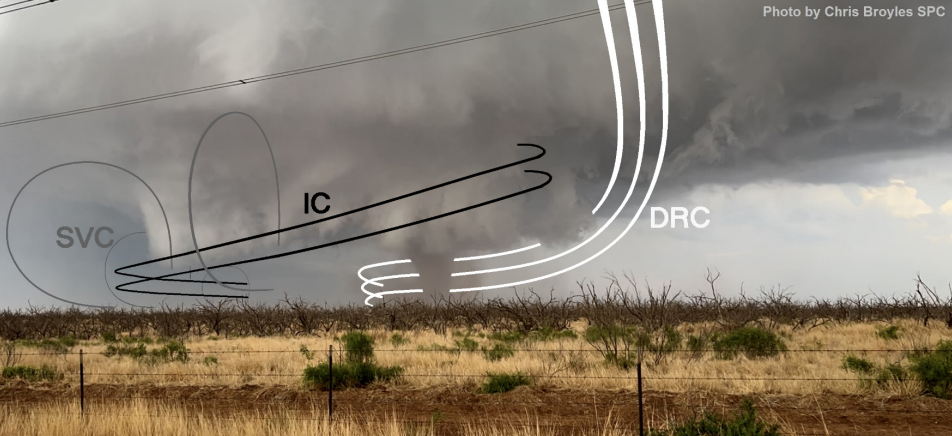
The 2022 Grow, Texas tornado, with illustrations highlighting the formation of the DRC.

The formation of descending reflectivity cores in supercell thunderstorms is a complex process influenced by various atmospheric dynamics. Research, particularly involving high-resolution radar data and numerical simulations, has identified several mechanisms through which DRCs can develop:

=== Stagnation of midlevel flow (Type I) ===
One of the primary mechanisms for DRC formation involves the stagnation of midlevel flow in supercell thunderstorms. This process occurs when updrafts in the storm intensify, leading to an accumulation of precipitation at the updraft summit. As this rainwater spills down the flanks of the updraft due to its tilt and the environmental wind profile, it forms a stagnation zone on the rear side of the storm. This zone is characterized by a buildup of precipitation that begins to descend once its terminal fall speed exceeds the updraft speed. This mechanism is delicate and seems to be a rare occurrence within the lifecycle of a supercell.

=== Updraft-mesocyclone cycling (Type II) ===
Another mechanism for DRC formation is associated with updraft-mesocyclone cycling. In this process, a new hook echo and subsequent DRC can form as part of the cyclic nature of the supercell. This is observed when the original hook echo decays and a new hook echo forms, not from the horizontal advection of hydrometeors from the main echo region but from falling hydrometeors enhancing reflectivity at lower elevation scans. This mechanism suggests a more dynamic and recurrent formation process of DRCs in relation to the evolving structure of the supercell.

=== Discrete propagation processes (Type III) ===
The third identified mechanism involves discrete propagation processes, distinct from the horizontal advection of hydrometeors. In this case, DRCs develop as reflectivity values appear within the hook echo, far from the main echo, suggesting a vertical rather than horizontal influence. This process indicates the development of DRCs due to unique atmospheric conditions that lead to the enhancement and eventual detachment of a reflectivity maximum from the main storm echo.

== Impact on tornadogenesis ==
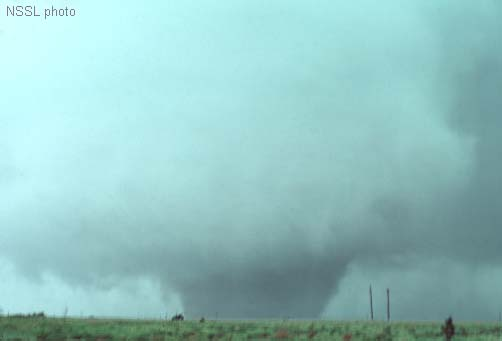
The May 16, 1977 Shamrock, Texas tornado, which had an observed DRC associated with its formation.

The relationship between descending reflectivity cores and tornadogenesis in supercell thunderstorms is a significant area of interest for meteorologists, given the potential of DRCs to influence storm dynamics and tornado formation.

DRCs have been observed to impact the low-level wind fields in supercells, a critical factor in tornado development. Upon descent to lower levels, DRCs are often accompanied by enhanced rear-to-front flow, which can lead to the formation of counter-rotating vortices. These vortices, particularly the cyclonic member, may act as precursors or catalysts to tornadogenesis. However, the exact impact of DRCs on tornado formation is complex and not yet fully understood.

Some studies suggest that the presence of a DRC may be a more reliable indicator of tornado likelihood than the hook echo alone. While hook echoes are a well-known radar signature of supercells, their presence does not consistently indicate tornado formation. In contrast, the appearance of a DRC, especially when observed in conjunction with other favorable conditions, might more accurately signify the potential for tornadogenesis.

Despite these observations, the predictive value of DRCs in forecasting tornadoes remains a challenge due to their variability. Not all DRCs lead to increases in low-level rotation, and their impact on the wind field can vary significantly from one storm to another. This variability makes it difficult to generalize the role of DRCs

== Notable instances ==
Multiple long-lived and violent tornadoes have been observed to have their formation associated with a DRC.

- 2025 Enderlin tornado
- 2022 Grow, TX tornado
- 2019 Dayton tornado
- 2017 New Orleans tornado
- 2016 Katie tornado
- 2015 Rochelle tornado
- 2014 Vilonia tornado
- 2013 Shawnee tornado
- 2013 Moore tornado
- 2013 El Reno tornado
- 2013 Hattiesburg tornado
- 2012 Henryville tornado
- 2011 El Reno tornado
- 2011 Goldsby tornado
- 2011 Joplin tornado
- 2010 Bowdle tornado
- 2008 Tipton, KS tornado
- 2008 Parkersburg tornado
- 2000 Crowell, TX tornado
- 1996 Decatur tornado
- 1965 Palm Sunday tornadoes

== See also ==
- Anticyclonic storm – Type of storm
- Cyclogenesis – Development or strengthening of cyclonic circulation in the atmosphere
- High-pressure area – Region with higher atmospheric pressure
