= Lemon technique =

Meteorological method to determine relative strength of thunderstorm cells

The Lemon technique is a method used by meteorologists using weather radar to determine the relative strength of thunderstorm cells in a vertically sheared environment. It is named for Leslie R. Lemon, the co-creator of the current conceptual model of a supercell. The Lemon technique is largely a continuation of work by Keith A. Browning, who first identified and named the supercell.

The method focuses on updrafts and uses weather radar to measure quantities such as height (echo tops), reflectivity (such as morphology and gradient), and location to show features and trends described by Lemon. These features include:

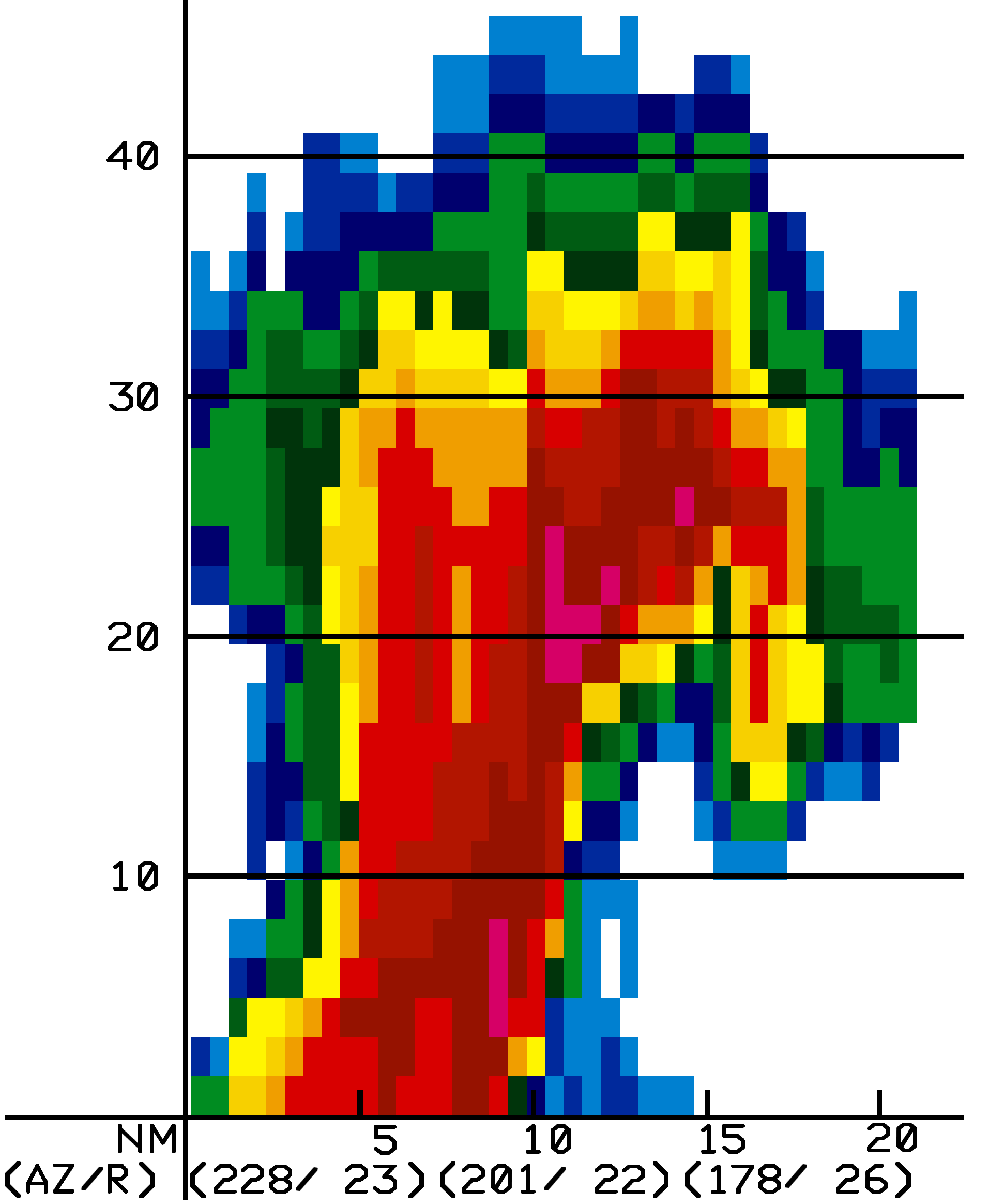
Vertical cross-section through a supercell exhibiting a BWER.

- Updraft tilt - The tilted updraft (vertical orientation) of the main updraft is an indication of the strength of the updraft, with nearly vertical tilts indicating stronger updrafts.
- Echo overhang - In intense thunderstorms, an area of very strong reflectivity atop the weak echo region and on the low-level inflow inside side of the storm.
- Weak echo region (WER) - An area of markedly lower reflectivity, resulting from an increase in updraft strength.
- Bounded weak echo region (BWER) - Another area of markedly lower reflectivity, now bounded by an area of high reflectivity. This is observed as a "hole" in reflectivity, and is caused by an updraft powerful enough to prevent ice and liquid from reaching the ground. This powerful updraft is often an indication of, or is facilitated by, a mesocyclone. A mesocyclone is not strictly necessary for BWER development. Storm rotation can be reliably detected by the Doppler velocities of a weather radar.
- Descending reflectivity core

== See also ==
- Convective storm detection
