= Coronado, Kansas =

Unincorporated community in Wichita County, Kansas

- Unincorporated community
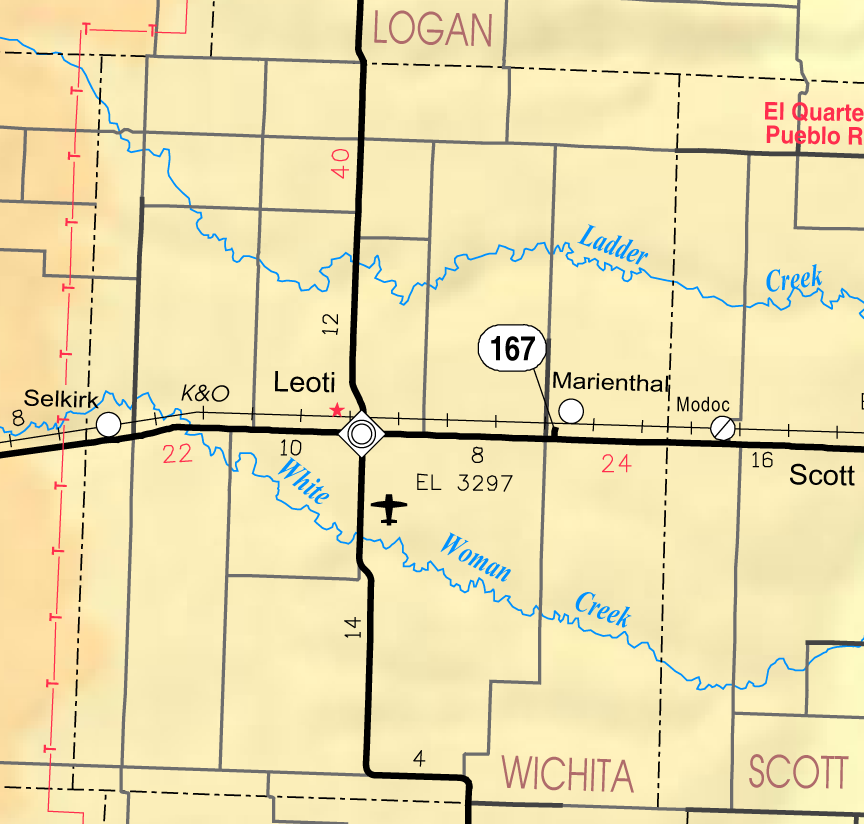
- KDOT map of Wichita County (legend)

- Location within Kansas Location within the United States
- Coordinates: 38°29′09″N 101°18′17″W
- Country: United States
- State: Kansas
- County: Wichita
- Elevation: 3,271 ft (997 m)
- Time zone: UTC-6 (CST)
  - Summer (DST): UTC-5 (CDT)
- Area code: 620
- FIPS code: 20-15775
- GNIS ID: 484561

Coronado is an unincorporated community in Wichita County, Kansas, United States. It is located a couple of miles east of Leoti.

== History ==
Platted in 1885, Coronado was involved in one of the bloodiest county seat fight in the history of the American West. The shoot-out on February 27, 1887, with boosters—some would say hired gunmen—from nearby Leoti left several people dead and wounded. Afterwards numerous famous lawmen from Dodge City, which included Wyatt Earp and Bat Masterson, gathered to calm the storm that ensued after the bloody fight. A small town called Farmer City, which was located between Coronado and Leoti, was hoped by some to become the county seat—which would end the fighting. Leoti later won the right to become the county seat and now the other two towns consist mainly of farmland.

Coronado had a post office from 1886 until 1899.
