= Farmer City, Kansas =

Ghost town in Wichita County, Kansas

- Ghost town
- Notice in The Western Farmer newspaper on 31 May 1888, touting Farmer City as the future county seat

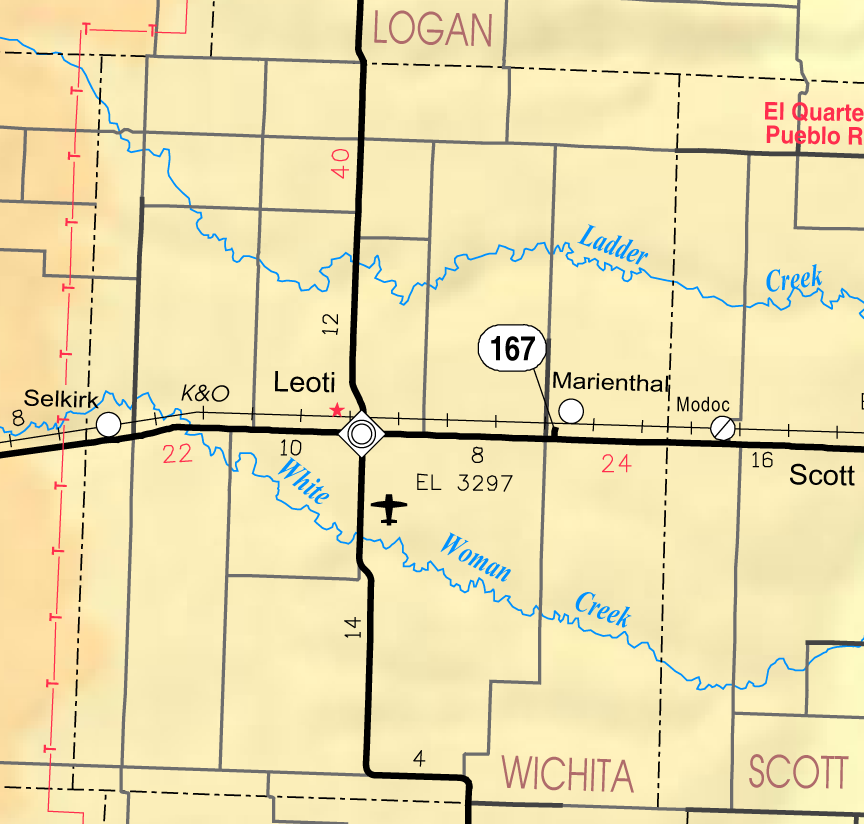
- KDOT map of Wichita County (legend)

- Location within Kansas Location within the United States
- Coordinates: 38°17′8″N 101°11′35″W
- Country: United States
- State: Kansas
- County: Wichita

Population
  - Total: 0
- Time zone: UTC-6 (CST)
  - Summer (DST): UTC-5 (CDT)
- Area code: 620

Farmer City is a ghost town in Wichita County, Kansas, United States.

== History ==
In the late 1880s, some hoped Farmer City would become the county seat of Wichita County (which was formed in 1886) — a compromise between the fighting towns of Leoti and Coronado in a hotly contested and bloody county seat war. The local newspaper, the Western Farmer, even moved from Leoti to Farmer City, though still reported its home location as Coronado, Farmer City, and Leoti, to keep the peace. Two County Commissioners moved public records to Farmer City, thinking it would prevail in the fight, though others demanded that the sheriff return the records.

On July 4, 1888, law enforcer Bill Tilghman shot and killed Ed Prather at Farmer City.

Soon after Leoti won the county seat fight, Farmer City and most of Coronado vanished.
