= Leoti, Kansas =

City in Wichita County, Kansas

- City and County seat
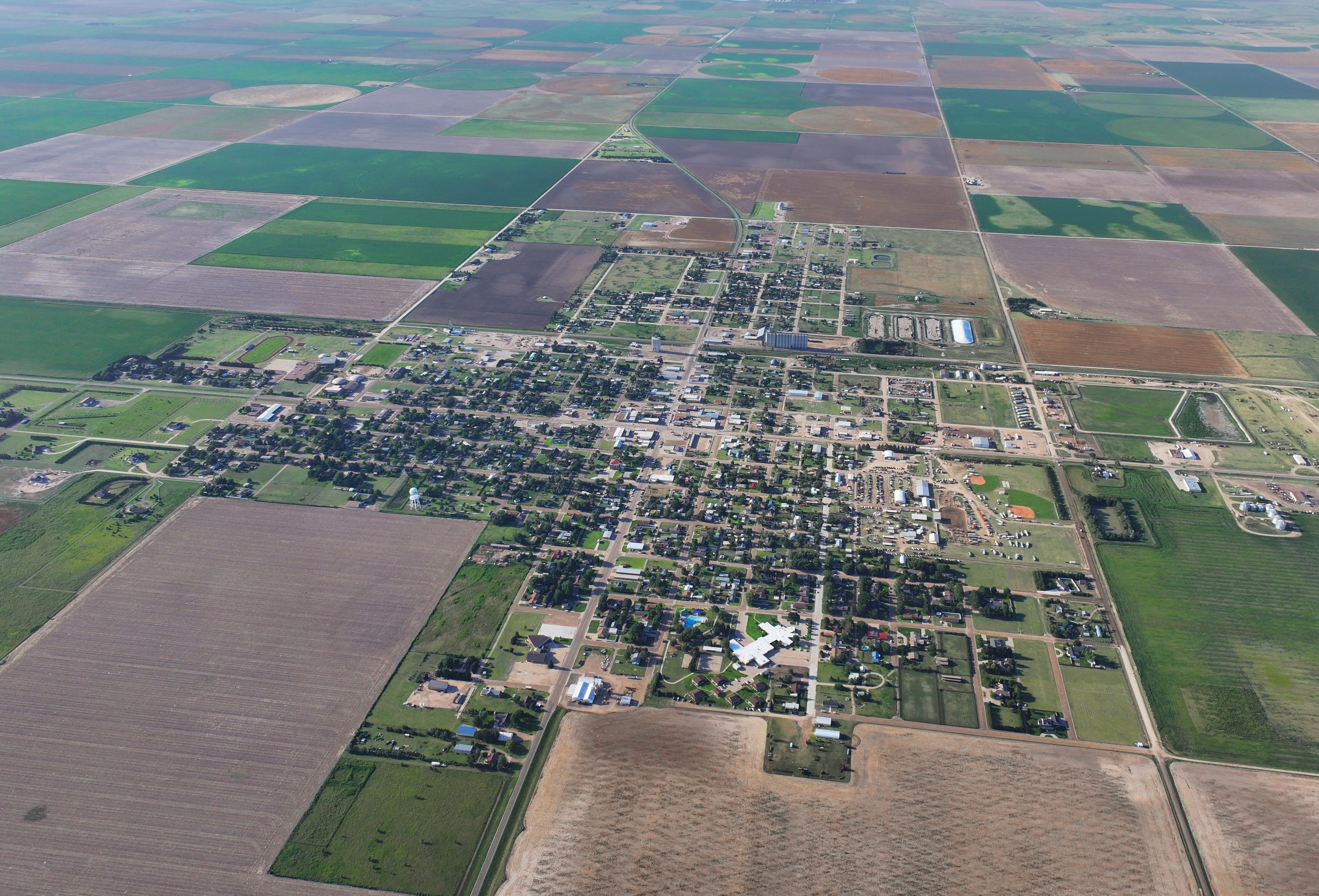
- Aerial view of Leoti (2023)

- Seal

- Location within Wichita County and Kansas

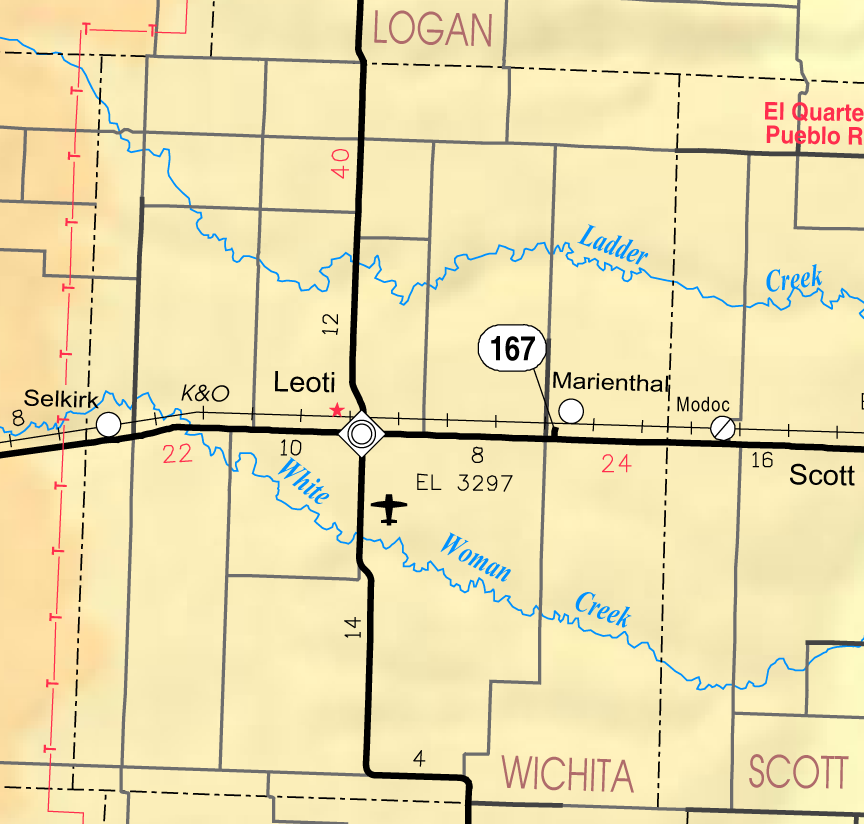
- KDOT map of Wichita County (legend)
- Coordinates: 38°29′00″N 101°21′28″W
- Country: United States
- State: Kansas
- County: Wichita
- Founded: 1885
- Incorporated: 1887

Area
  - Total: 1.32 sq mi (3.41 km^{2})
  - Land: 1.32 sq mi (3.41 km^{2})
  - Water: 0 sq mi (0.00 km^{2})
- Elevation: 3,301 ft (1,006 m)

Population (2020)
  - Total: 1,475
  - Density: 1,120/sq mi (433/km^{2})
- Time zone: UTC-6 (CST)
  - Summer (DST): UTC-5 (CDT)
- ZIP Code: 67861
- Area code: 620
- FIPS code: 20-39550
- GNIS ID: 2395684
- Website: leotikansas.org

Leoti (/liːˈoʊtə/) is a city in and the county seat of Wichita County, Kansas, United States. As of the 2020 census, the population of the city was 1,475.

== History ==
Leoti was founded in 1885 by a company of men from Garden City, Kansas. Two years later, in 1887, it was involved in the bloodiest county seat fight in the history of the American West. The shoot-out was on February 27, 1887, when men—some say hired gunmen—from Leoti, went to the neighboring, rival town of Coronado and left several people dead and wounded. A small town called Farmer City which was located between Coronado and Leoti, was hoped by some to become the county seat—which would end the fighting. Leoti later won the right to become the county seat and now the two other towns consist mainly of farmland.

The origin of the name Leoti is disputed: one tradition says the name is an Indian term for "prairie flower"; another says the community was named for settler Leoti Kibbee; a third says it was named for Leoti Gray, the daughter of a town founder.

== Geography ==
According to the United States Census Bureau, the city has a total area of 1.31 square miles (3.39 km^{2}), all land.

=== Climate ===
According to the Köppen Climate Classification system, Leoti has a semi-arid climate, abbreviated "BSk" on climate maps.

Climate data for Leoti, Kansas, 1991–2020 normals, extremes 1893–2018
Month	Jan	Feb	Mar	Apr	May	Jun	Jul	Aug	Sep	Oct	Nov	Dec	Year
Record high °F (°C)	78 (26)	83 (28)	90 (32)	98 (37)	104 (40)	110 (43)	111 (44)	109 (43)	105 (41)	96 (36)	89 (32)	80 (27)	111 (44)
Mean maximum °F (°C)	66.7 (19.3)	71.7 (22.1)	80.3 (26.8)	87.7 (30.9)	94.1 (34.5)	99.6 (37.6)	102.8 (39.3)	100.9 (38.3)	97.2 (36.2)	89.1 (31.7)	76.4 (24.7)	66.5 (19.2)	103.5 (39.7)
Mean daily maximum °F (°C)	44.2 (6.8)	47.7 (8.7)	57.3 (14.1)	65.5 (18.6)	75.2 (24.0)	86.6 (30.3)	91.5 (33.1)	88.5 (31.4)	81.7 (27.6)	68.4 (20.2)	55.1 (12.8)	45.1 (7.3)	67.2 (19.6)
Daily mean °F (°C)	30.1 (−1.1)	33.0 (0.6)	41.9 (5.5)	49.8 (9.9)	60.3 (15.7)	71.7 (22.1)	76.8 (24.9)	74.3 (23.5)	66.2 (19.0)	52.9 (11.6)	40.0 (4.4)	31.1 (−0.5)	52.3 (11.3)
Mean daily minimum °F (°C)	16.0 (−8.9)	18.3 (−7.6)	26.4 (−3.1)	34.1 (1.2)	45.5 (7.5)	56.8 (13.8)	62.0 (16.7)	60.1 (15.6)	50.7 (10.4)	37.3 (2.9)	25.0 (−3.9)	17.1 (−8.3)	37.4 (3.0)
Mean minimum °F (°C)	−1.6 (−18.7)	1.2 (−17.1)	9.4 (−12.6)	20.4 (−6.4)	31.8 (−0.1)	44.7 (7.1)	53.2 (11.8)	51.6 (10.9)	35.6 (2.0)	22.2 (−5.4)	8.5 (−13.1)	−0.6 (−18.1)	−8.8 (−22.7)
Record low °F (°C)	−26 (−32)	−25 (−32)	−21 (−29)	2 (−17)	18 (−8)	32 (0)	40 (4)	34 (1)	24 (−4)	2 (−17)	−10 (−23)	−22 (−30)	−26 (−32)
Average precipitation inches (mm)	0.38 (9.7)	0.51 (13)	1.27 (32)	1.95 (50)	2.31 (59)	2.58 (66)	2.87 (73)	3.11 (79)	1.40 (36)	1.66 (42)	0.64 (16)	0.60 (15)	19.28 (490.7)
Average snowfall inches (cm)	5.0 (13)	4.6 (12)	4.1 (10)	2.3 (5.8)	0.1 (0.25)	0.0 (0.0)	0.0 (0.0)	0.0 (0.0)	0.1 (0.25)	1.3 (3.3)	2.4 (6.1)	3.9 (9.9)	23.8 (60.6)
Average precipitation days (≥ 0.01 in)	2.7	2.7	3.9	6.3	7.6	7.8	8.1	8.6	5.2	4.2	3.0	2.5	62.6
Average snowy days (≥ 0.1 in)	2.4	2.3	1.7	0.7	0.0	0.0	0.0	0.0	0.0	0.5	1.2	2.1	10.9
Source 1: NOAA (mean maxima/minima 1981–2010)
Source 2: National Weather Service

== Demographics ==
Historical population
Census	Pop.	Note	%±
1890	341		—
1900	151		−55.7%
1910	288		90.7%
1920	392		36.1%
1930	618		57.7%
1940	816		32.0%
1950	1,250		53.2%
1960	1,401		12.1%
1970	1,916		36.8%
1980	1,869		−2.5%
1990	1,738		−7.0%
2000	1,598		−8.1%
2010	1,534		−4.0%
2020	1,475		−3.8%
U.S. Decennial Census

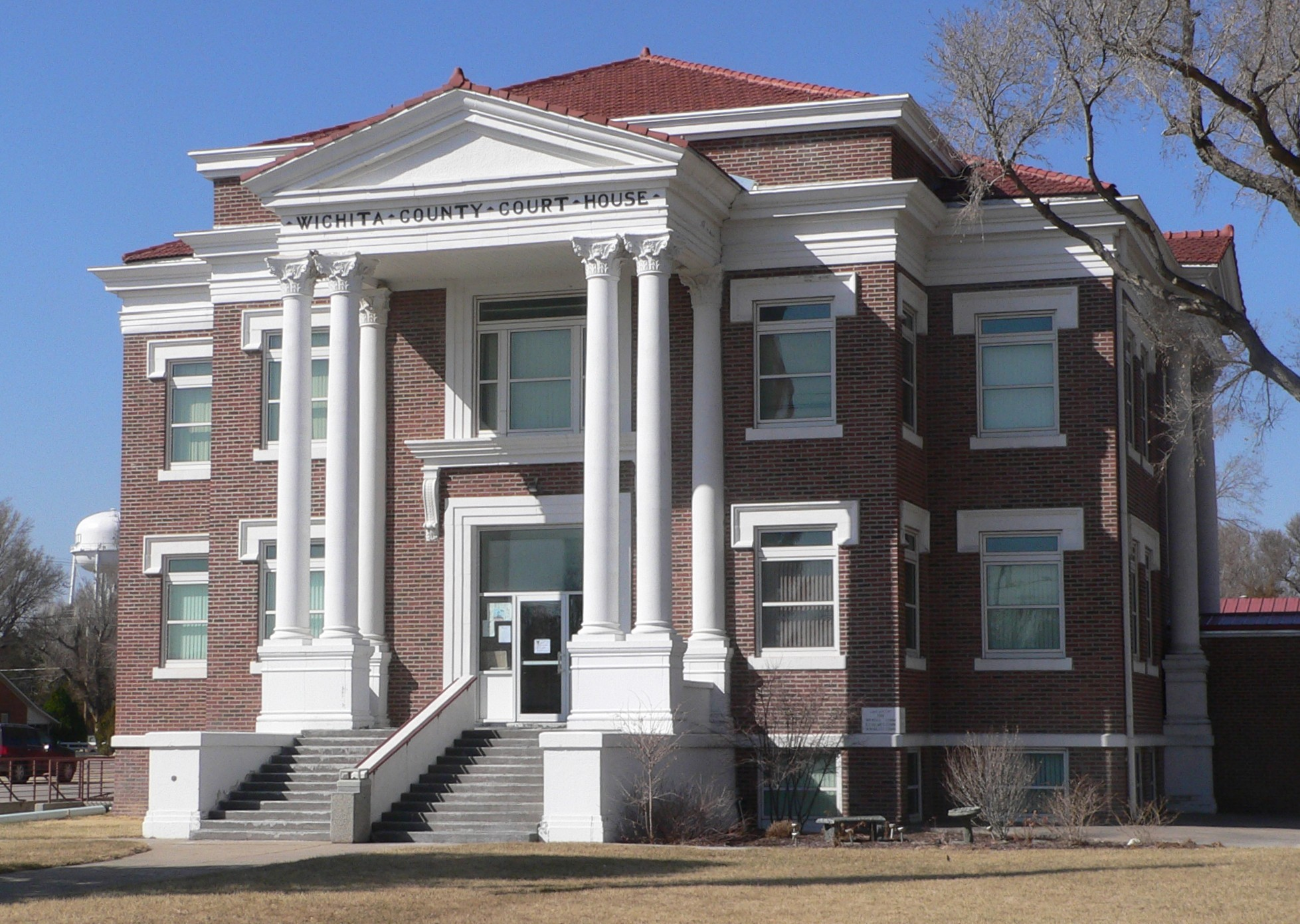
Wichita County courthouse in Leoti (2015)

=== 2020 census ===
The 2020 United States census counted 1,475 people, 589 households, and 375 families in Leoti. The population density was 1,120.8 per square mile (432.7/km^{2}). There were 669 housing units at an average density of 508.4 per square mile (196.3/km^{2}). The racial makeup was 64.34% (949) white or European American (55.46% non-Hispanic white), 0.14% (2) black or African-American, 1.22% (18) Native American or Alaska Native, 0.0% (0) Asian, 0.14% (2) Pacific Islander or Native Hawaiian, 17.15% (253) from other races, and 17.02% (251) from two or more races. Hispanic or Latino of any race was 39.66% (585) of the population.

Of the 589 households, 34.3% had children under the age of 18; 49.1% were married couples living together; 21.1% had a female householder with no spouse or partner present. 30.1% of households consisted of individuals and 12.4% had someone living alone who was 65 years of age or older. The average household size was 2.3 and the average family size was 3.1. The percent of those with a bachelor's degree or higher was estimated to be 14.2% of the population.

26.7% of the population was under the age of 18, 7.9% from 18 to 24, 24.5% from 25 to 44, 21.2% from 45 to 64, and 19.7% who were 65 years of age or older. The median age was 36.9 years. For every 100 females, there were 94.1 males. For every 100 females ages 18 and older, there were 94.1 males.

The 2016–2020 5-year American Community Survey estimates show that the median household income was $58,819 (with a margin of error of +/- $11,529) and the median family income was $80,441 (+/- $19,014). Males had a median income of $40,250 (+/- $10,260) versus $31,641 (+/- $8,897) for females. The median income for those above 16 years old was $35,268 (+/- $6,972). Approximately, 1.2% of families and 5.5% of the population were below the poverty line, including 2.6% of those under the age of 18 and 11.7% of those ages 65 or over.

=== 2010 census ===
As of the census of 2010, there were 1,534 people, 607 households, and 419 families residing in the city. The population density was 1,171.0 inhabitants per square mile (452.1/km^{2}). There were 708 housing units at an average density of 540.5 per square mile (208.7/km^{2}). The racial makeup of the city was 85.8% White, 0.7% African American, 0.6% Native American, 0.1% Asian, 10.8% from other races, and 2.1% from two or more races. Hispanic or Latino of any race were 31.6% of the population.

There were 607 households, of which 35.4% had children under the age of 18 living with them, 55.7% were married couples living together, 8.2% had a female householder with no husband present, 5.1% had a male householder with no wife present, and 31.0% were non-families. 28.5% of all households were made up of individuals, and 14% had someone living alone who was 65 years of age or older. The average household size was 2.48 and the average family size was 3.05.

The median age in the city was 37.4 years. 29.1% of residents were under the age of 18; 5% were between the ages of 18 and 24; 24.6% were from 25 to 44; 23.6% were from 45 to 64; and 17.7% were 65 years of age or older. The gender makeup of the city was 49.7% male and 50.3% female.

== Education ==
The community is served by Leoti–Wichita County USD 467 public school district. The Wichita County High School mascot is Wichita County Indians.

Prior to school unification, Leoti High School also used the Indians mascot.

== Notable people ==
- Marion Charles Bonner, paleontologist, fossil collector.
- Ben Diggins, baseball player.
- Steve Tasker, football player (retired), sportscaster.
