= Selkirk, Kansas =

Unincorporated community in Wichita County, Kansas

- Unincorporated community
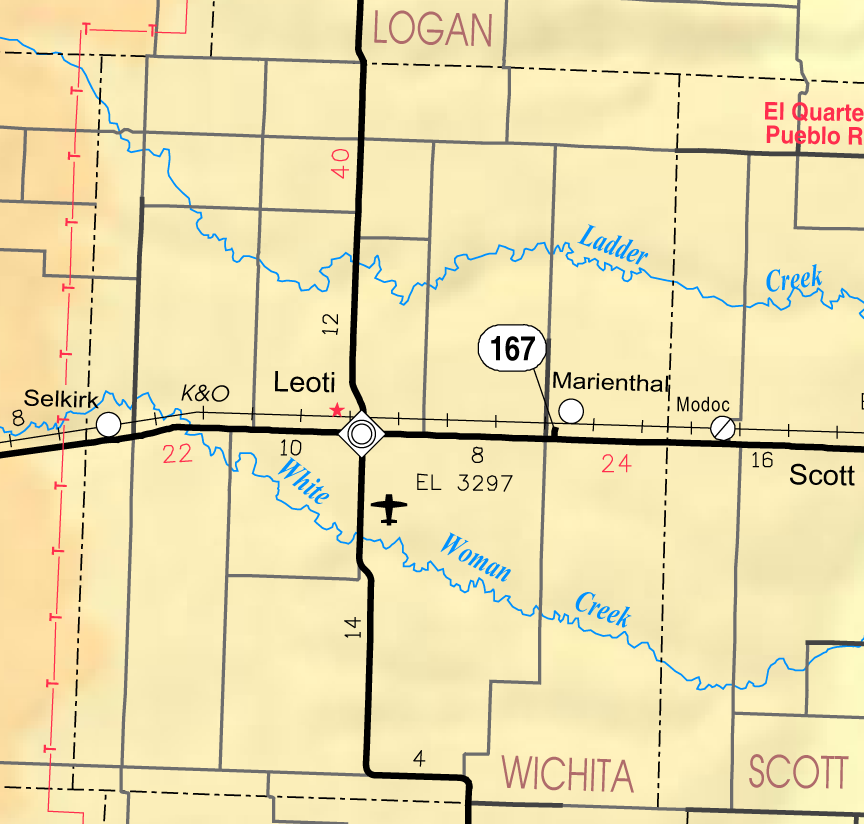
- KDOT map of Wichita County (legend)

- Location within Kansas Location within the United States
- Coordinates: 38°28′24″N 101°32′37″W
- Country: United States
- State: Kansas
- County: Wichita
- Elevation: 3,445 ft (1,050 m)
- Time zone: UTC-6 (CST)
  - Summer (DST): UTC-5 (CDT)
- Area code: 620
- FIPS code: 20-63900
- GNIS ID: 471496

Selkirk is an unincorporated community in Wichita County, Kansas, United States. It is located between Leoti and Tribune.

== History ==
Selkirk had a post office between 1887 and 1980.
