= Pullens, Virginia =

Unincorporated community in Virginia, US

Coordinates: 36°56′06″N 79°29′55″W

Pullens is an unincorporated community in Pittsylvania County, in the U.S. state of Virginia.
