= Wichita County, Kansas =

County in Kansas, United States

- County
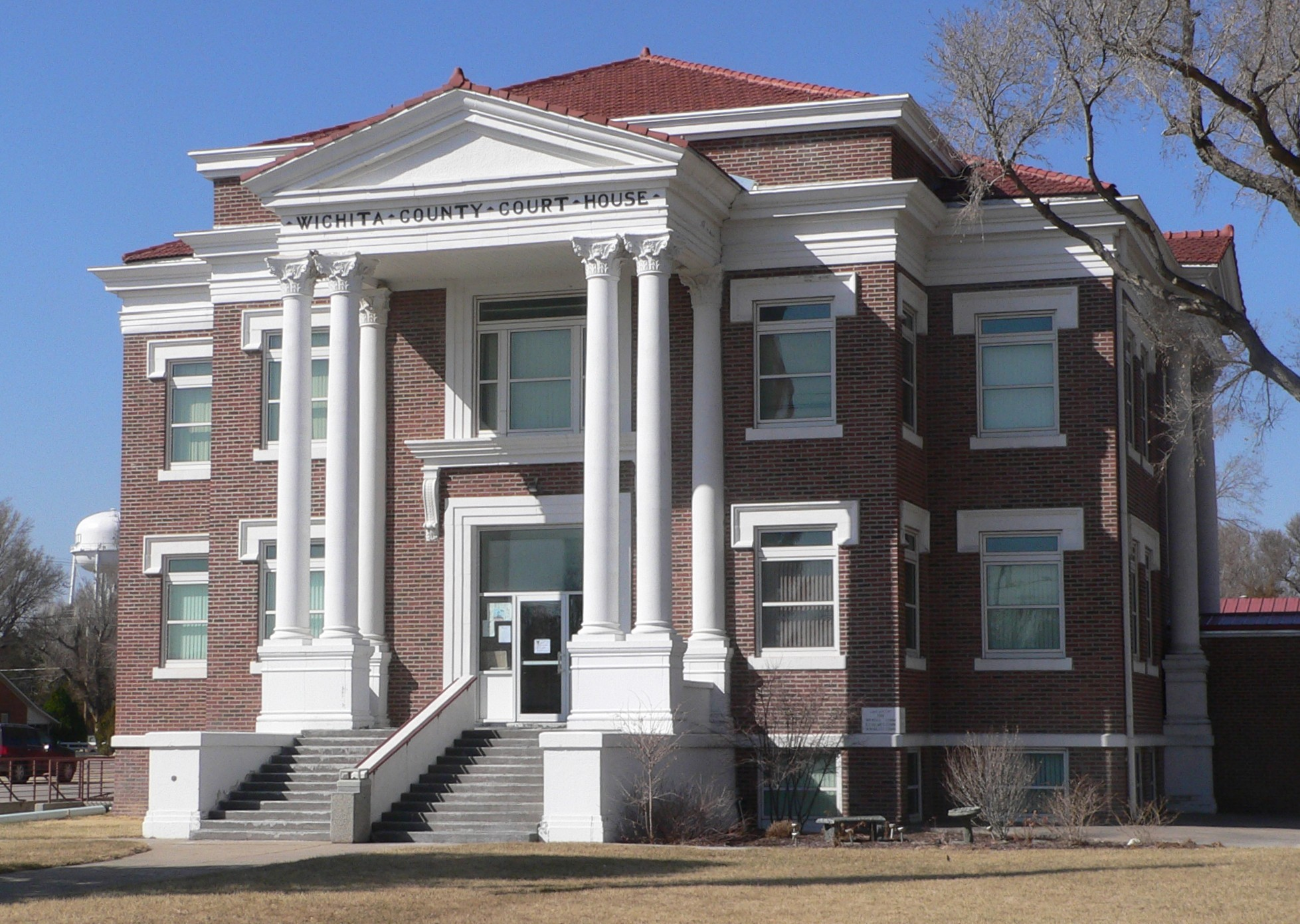
- Wichita County Courthouse in Leoti (2015)

- Location within the U.S. state of Kansas
- Coordinates: 38°28′00″N 101°21′00″W
- Country: United States
- State: Kansas
- Founded: December 24, 1886
- Named for: Wichita tribe
- Seat: Leoti
- Largest city: Leoti

Area
  - Total: 719 sq mi (1,860 km^{2})
  - Land: 719 sq mi (1,860 km^{2})
  - Water: 0.02 sq mi (0.052 km^{2}) 0.0%

Population (2020)
  - Total: 2,152
  - Estimate (2025): 2,031 ▼
  - Density: 2.99/sq mi (1.16/km^{2})
- Time zone: UTC−6 (Central)
  - Summer (DST): UTC−5 (CDT)
- Congressional district: 1st
- Website: wichitacounty.org

Wichita County is a county located in the U.S. state of Kansas. Its county seat is Leoti. As of the 2020 census, the county population was 2,152. The county was named after the Wichita tribe.

== History ==
=== Early history ===
For many millennia, the Great Plains of North America was inhabited by nomadic Native Americans. From the 16th century to 18th century, the Kingdom of France claimed ownership of large parts of North America. In 1762, after the French and Indian War, France secretly ceded New France to Spain, in accordance with the Treaty of Fontainebleau.

=== 19th century ===
In 1802, Spain returned most of the land to France, but keeping title to about 7,500 square miles. In 1803, most of the land for modern day Kansas was acquired by the United States from France as part of the 828,000 square mile Louisiana Purchase for 2.83 cents per acre.

In 1854, the Kansas Territory was organized, then in 1861 Kansas became the 34th U.S. state. In 1886, Wichita County was established.

== Geography ==
According to the U.S. Census Bureau, the county has a total area of 719 square miles (1,860 km^{2}), virtually all of which is land.

=== Major highways ===
- Kansas Highway 25
- Kansas Highway 96

=== Adjacent counties ===
- Logan County (north)
- Scott County (east)
- Kearny County (south)
- Hamilton County (southwest/Mountain Time border)
- Greeley County (west/Mountain Time border)
- Wallace County (northwest/Mountain Time border)

== Demographics ==
Historical population
Census	Pop.	Note	%±
1880	14		—
1890	1,827		12,950.0%
1900	1,197		−34.5%
1910	2,006		67.6%
1920	1,856		−7.5%
1930	2,579		39.0%
1940	2,185		−15.3%
1950	2,640		20.8%
1960	2,765		4.7%
1970	3,274		18.4%
1980	3,041		−7.1%
1990	2,758		−9.3%
2000	2,531		−8.2%
2010	2,234		−11.7%
2020	2,152		−3.7%
2025 (est.)	2,031	▼	−5.6%
U.S. Decennial Census; 1790-1960 1900-1990; 1990-2000 2010-2020

=== Racial and ethnic composition ===
Wichita County, Kansas – Racial and ethnic composition Note: the US Census treats Hispanic/Latino as an ethnic category. This table excludes Latinos from the racial categories and assigns them to a separate category. Hispanics/Latinos may be of any race.
Race / Ethnicity (NH = Non-Hispanic)	Pop 1980	Pop 1990	Pop 2000	Pop 2010	Pop 2020	% 1980	% 1990	% 2000	% 2010	% 2020
White alone (NH)	2,638	2,414	2,024	1,647	1,412	86.75%	87.53%	79.97%	73.72%	65.61%
Black or African American alone (NH)	1	1	2	14	1	0.03%	0.04%	0.08%	0.63%	0.05%
Native American or Alaska Native alone (NH)	1	8	18	5	8	0.03%	0.29%	0.71%	0.22%	0.37%
Asian alone (NH)	5	8	2	3	0	0.16%	0.29%	0.08%	0.13%	0.00%
Native Hawaiian or Pacific Islander alone (NH)	x	x	0	0	2	x	x	0.00%	0.00%	0.09%
Other race alone (NH)	9	1	0	0	6	0.30%	0.04%	0.00%	0.00%	0.28%
Mixed race or Multiracial (NH)	x	x	19	15	87	x	x	0.75%	0.67%	4.04%
Hispanic or Latino (any race)	387	326	466	550	636	12.73%	11.82%	18.41%	24.62%	29.55%
Total	3,041	2,758	2,531	2,234	2,152	100.00%	100.00%	100.00%	100.00%	100.00%

=== 2020 census ===
As of the 2020 census, the county had a population of 2,152. The median age was 38.5 years. 26.9% of residents were under the age of 18 and 19.7% of residents were 65 years of age or older. For every 100 females there were 109.1 males, and for every 100 females age 18 and over there were 108.2 males age 18 and over.

The racial makeup of the county was 71.9% White, 0.1% Black or African American, 1.1% American Indian and Alaska Native, 0.1% Asian, 0.1% Native Hawaiian and Pacific Islander, 12.7% from some other race, and 14.0% from two or more races. Hispanic or Latino residents of any race comprised 29.6% of the population.

0.0% of residents lived in urban areas, while 100.0% lived in rural areas.

There were 846 households in the county, of which 33.5% had children under the age of 18 living with them and 18.1% had a female householder with no spouse or partner present. About 27.1% of all households were made up of individuals and 12.3% had someone living alone who was 65 years of age or older.

There were 999 housing units, of which 15.3% were vacant. Among occupied housing units, 74.6% were owner-occupied and 25.4% were renter-occupied. The homeowner vacancy rate was 2.3% and the rental vacancy rate was 6.3%.

=== 2000 census ===
As of the census of 2000, there were 2,531 people, 967 households, and 723 families residing in the county. The population density was 4 people per square mile (1.5 people/km^{2}). There were 1,119 housing units at an average density of 2 per square mile (0.77/km^{2}). The racial makeup of the county was 86.25% White, 0.08% Black or African American, 0.71% Native American, 0.08% Asian, 10.51% from other races, and 2.37% from two or more races. 18.41% of the population were Hispanic or Latino of any race.

There were 967 households, out of which 35.10% had children under the age of 18 living with them, 65.30% were married couples living together, 5.80% had a female householder with no husband present, and 25.20% were non-families. 23.70% of all households were made up of individuals, and 10.00% had someone living alone who was 65 years of age or older. The average household size was 2.59 and the average family size was 3.07.

In the county, the population was spread out, with 28.70% under the age of 18, 7.30% from 18 to 24, 25.70% from 25 to 44, 22.30% from 45 to 64, and 16.00% who were 65 years of age or older. The median age was 37 years. For every 100 females there were 104.40 males. For every 100 females age 18 and over, there were 102.60 males.

The median income for a household in the county was $33,462, and the median income for a family was $41,034. Males had a median income of $27,523 versus $18,807 for females. The per capita income for the county was $16,720. About 11.20% of families and 14.80% of the population were below the poverty line, including 23.20% of those under age 18 and 4.70% of those age 65 or over.

== Government ==
=== Presidential elections ===
Presidential election results

United States presidential election results for Wichita County, Kansas
Year	Republican		Democratic		Third party(ies)	
Year	No.	%	No.	%	No.	%
1888	438	59.35%	207	28.05%	93	12.60%
1892	245	53.26%	0	0.00%	215	46.74%
1896	214	52.32%	192	46.94%	3	0.73%
1900	201	60.36%	128	38.44%	4	1.20%
1904	245	67.31%	91	25.00%	28	7.69%
1908	233	54.31%	173	40.33%	23	5.36%
1912	82	22.10%	135	36.39%	154	41.51%
1916	318	44.04%	333	46.12%	71	9.83%
1920	422	73.91%	127	22.24%	22	3.85%
1924	482	62.68%	147	19.12%	140	18.21%
1928	464	54.91%	370	43.79%	11	1.30%
1932	375	32.92%	732	64.27%	32	2.81%
1936	448	41.06%	637	58.39%	6	0.55%
1940	644	59.08%	433	39.72%	13	1.19%
1944	604	64.32%	329	35.04%	6	0.64%
1948	606	56.27%	443	41.13%	28	2.60%
1952	910	75.90%	276	23.02%	13	1.08%
1956	747	70.41%	312	29.41%	2	0.19%
1960	702	55.63%	554	43.90%	6	0.48%
1964	529	44.19%	662	55.30%	6	0.50%
1968	757	60.37%	364	29.03%	133	10.61%
1972	794	69.89%	288	25.35%	54	4.75%
1976	593	47.90%	614	49.60%	31	2.50%
1980	880	69.95%	303	24.09%	75	5.96%
1984	916	78.90%	232	19.98%	13	1.12%
1988	721	62.80%	399	34.76%	28	2.44%
1992	681	55.37%	241	19.59%	308	25.04%
1996	796	71.13%	239	21.36%	84	7.51%
2000	859	78.81%	207	18.99%	24	2.20%
2004	869	81.83%	183	17.23%	10	0.94%
2008	840	82.43%	163	16.00%	16	1.57%
2012	821	83.18%	157	15.91%	9	0.91%
2016	769	80.44%	140	14.64%	47	4.92%
2020	808	83.47%	149	15.39%	11	1.14%
2024	740	86.05%	107	12.44%	13	1.51%

Wichita County is overwhelmingly Republican. It was last carried for the Democratic Party by Jimmy Carter in 1976, but since then the only Democrat to win over a quarter of the county's vote has been Michael Dukakis during the 1988 election when the Democratic vote was boosted by reaction against a major Great Plains drought. In the past seven elections no Democrat has topped twenty percent of Wichita County's vote – a situation now almost general in the High Plains.

=== Laws ===
Although the Kansas Constitution was amended in 1986 to allow the sale of alcoholic liquor by the individual drink with the approval of voters, Wichita County has remained a prohibition, or "dry", county. The latest county alcohol control map indicates the county now allows liquor sales.

== Education ==
- Leoti USD 467

== Communities ==
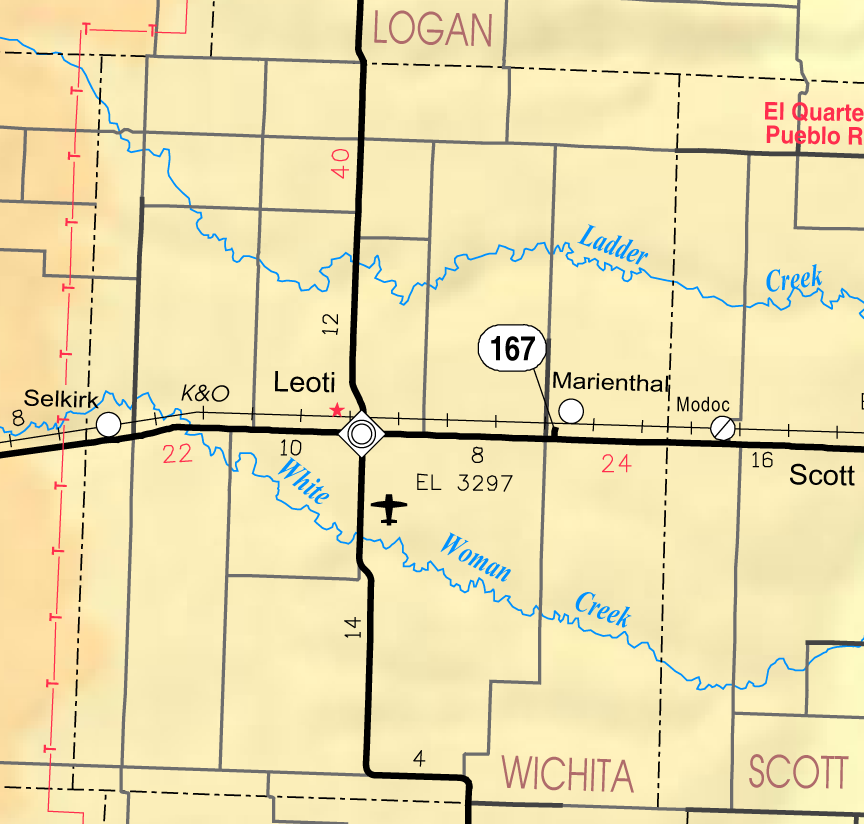
2005 map of Wichita County (map legend)

List of townships / incorporated cities / unincorporated communities / extinct former communities within Wichita County.
† means a community is designated a Census-Designated Place (CDP) by the United States Census Bureau.

=== Cities ===
- Leoti (county seat)

=== Unincorporated communities ===
- Coronado
- Lydia
- Marienthal†
- Selkirk

=== Ghost towns ===
- Farmer City

=== Townships ===
Wichita County has a single township. None of the cities within the county are considered governmentally independent, and all figures for the townships include those of the cities. In the following table, the population center is the largest city (or cities) included in that township's population total, if it is of a significant size.

Sources: 2000 U.S. Gazetteer from the U.S. Census Bureau.
Township	FIPS	Population center	Population	Population density /km^{2} (/sq mi)	Land area km^{2} (sq mi)	Water area km^{2} (sq mi)	Water %	Geographic coordinates
Leoti	39575	Leoti	2,531	1 (4)	1,861 (719)	0 (0)	0%	38°29′54″N 101°21′50″W

== See also ==
- National Register of Historic Places listings in Wichita County, Kansas
