= U.S. Route 69 in Oklahoma =

Segment of American highway

U.S. Highway 69
- US 69 highlighted in red

Route information
- Maintained by ODOT
- Length: 260.82 mi (419.75 km)

Major junctions
- South end: US 69 / US 75 south of Colbert
- US 70 in Durant; US 75 in Atoka; US 270 in McAlester; I-40 in Checotah; US 266 in Checotah; US 62 / US 64 in Muskogee; Future I-42 / US 412 in Chouteau I-44 Toll / Will Rogers Turnpike in Big Cabin; US 60 in Vinita; US 59 in Miami
- North end: US-69 / K-7 north of Picher

Location
- Country: United States
- State: Oklahoma
- Counties: Bryan, Atoka, Pittsburg, McIntosh, Muskogee, Wagoner, Mayes, Craig, Delaware, Ottawa

Highway system
- United States Numbered Highway System; List; Special; Divided; Oklahoma State Highway System; Interstate; US; State; Turnpikes
← SH-67	→ US 70

U.S. Route 69 (US 69) is a major north–south U.S. Highway in the U.S. state of Oklahoma. It extends the corridor formed by U.S. Route 75 in Texas from Dallas northeast via McAlester and Muskogee to the Will Rogers Turnpike (Interstate 44) near Vinita. From Vinita to the Kansas state line, US 69 generally parallels the turnpike along old U.S. Route 66.

== Route description ==
U.S. Route 69 crosses the Red River to enter Bryan County, Oklahoma concurrent with US 75 3 miles (4.8 km) south of Colbert. The first few miles of highway north of the state line are freeway-grade, featuring three interchanges, including one at State Highway 91. Near Calera, the route downgrades to an expressway. On the west side of Durant, however, US 69/75 becomes a freeway again, beginning with an interchange with U.S. Route 70 and followed by an interchange with SH-78. The freeway continues northeast, providing access to Armstrong, Caddo and SH-22 before becoming an expressway once again at the Atoka County line.

In Atoka County, US 69/75 bypass Caney and Tushka to the west before coming to the SH-3/7 junction in the county seat of Atoka, Oklahoma; at this junction, SH-3 joins with the U.S. routes while SH-7 has its eastern terminus. North of this interchange, US 75 and SH-3 split off, leaving US 69 without any concurrent routes for the first time since crossing the Red River. Seven miles (11 km) northwest of Atoka, US 69 begins another concurrency, this time with SH-43 near Stringtown. The two routes run along the east shore of Atoka Lake before SH-43 splits off to the west. US 69 then heads through unincorporated Chockie and then serves as the eastern terminus of SH-131 just south of the Pittsburg County line.

US 69 then crosses into Pittsburg County. US 69 runs just east of Kiowa where it intersects State Highway 63 at its western terminus. US 69 runs along the east edge of the McAlester Army Ammunition Plant, which it provides access to via an interchange near Savanna. It then has an interchange with the Indian Nation Turnpike, after which it enters McAlester. US 69 mostly runs along the east side of McAlester, the county seat of Pittsburg County with the downtown area being served by U.S. Highway 69 Business. The main route of US 69 has an interchange with US 270/SH-1/SH-31. North of McAlester, US 69 reunites with its business loop at an interchange which also serves as the southern terminus of SH-113. US 69 regains freeway status at this interchange and begins crossing over several arms of Lake Eufaula. US 69 provides several interchanges for lake access. Other interchanges serve the northern terminus of SH-113 (which has both termini at US 69) and the western terminus of SH-9A. US 69 then crosses the main channel of the Canadian River into McIntosh County.

Soon after crossing into McIntosh County, US 69 serves the county seat of Eufaula with exits for US 69's Eufaula business loop and State Highway 9. The freeway then has an exit to the southern terminus of State Highway 150. US 69 then meets Interstate 40 at a cloverleaf interchange and has a pair of interchanges serving Checotah. The route then enters Muskogee County where it has exits for Oktaha and Wainwright. The freeway then ends near Summit and US 69 continues north at-grade.

US 69 meets the western terminus of State Highway 165 as it enters Muskogee. The route runs along the west side of the city, intersecting U.S. Route 64 and briefly concurring with US 62. US 69 then crosses the Arkansas River into Wagoner County. Shortly after entering the county, the highway has an interchange with the Muskogee Turnpike, northeast of Tullahassee. In Wagoner, US 69 meets SH-51. It then enters Mayes County.

In Mayes County, the highway has an interchange with US 412 south of Chouteau. US 69 creates a spur to Sportsman Acres, SH-69A. The route then intersects SH-20 in Pryor and SH-28 in Adair. US 69 leaves Mayes County and enters Craig County south of Big Cabin. As the route approaches Big Cabin, signage affixed to the side of parked truck trailers warns of a speed zone, due to Big Cabin's former speed trap status. The trap was shut down by the Oklahoma Department of Public Safety on August 1, 2005. Just north of the town, US 69 has the first of three interchanges with Interstate 44, the Will Rogers Turnpike. After crossing the turnpike, the route begins a concurrency with US 60 into Vinita. The two U.S. routes serve as the southern terminus of SH-2 there. East of town, another access point to the turnpike is offered. SH-82's northern terminus lies 4 miles (6.4 km) east of this.

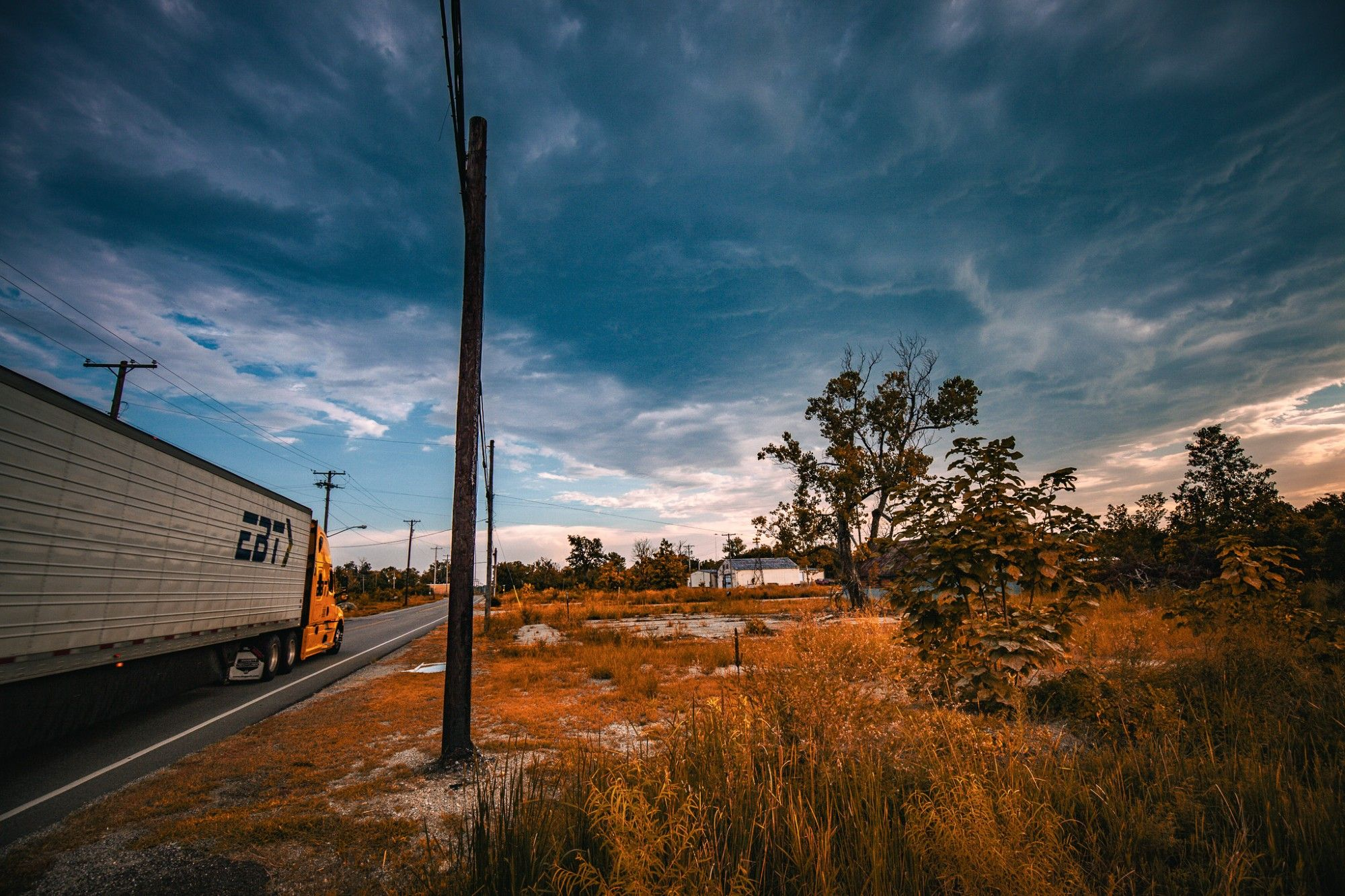
U.S. Rte 69 at East 1st St, Picher, Oklahoma, looking south.

US 60/69 cut the northwest corner of Delaware County, entering just west of the northern terminus of State Highway 85. The routes then cross into Ottawa County, passing through Afton, before US 59 joins the concurrency. Just north of this, US 60 splits off at an interchange which also serves as the third entry to the Will Rogers Turnpike. Near Narcissa, US 59/69 passes the east end of SH-25. US 59 then splits off to follow SH-10 westbound, while SH-10 eastbound follows US 69 into Miami. The two routes concur briefly before splitting near downtown Miami, where US 69 forms a one-way couplet. After reuniting north of downtown, US 69 serves as a major arterial through the city, before leaving town and arcing northeast through North Miami and Commerce. US 69 then spawns U.S. Route 69 Alternate to Quapaw and Baxter Springs, Kansas. The main route turns north, running through the Tar Creek Superfund site and abandoned community of Picher before leaving Oklahoma and entering the state of Kansas.

== History ==
U.S. Route 69 in Oklahoma generally follows the old Texas Road.

All of US 69 between the US 60 junction west of Vinita and the western terminus of US 69 ALT is part of the former route of U.S. Route 66.

The Intermodal Surface Transportation Efficiency Act of 1991 requires the United States Secretary of Transportation to designate U.S. 69 between the Texas state line and Checotah (I-40) as an Interstate highway upon request from ODOT.

== Major intersections ==
County	Location	mi	km	Exit	Destinations	Notes
Bryan	Red River	0.00	0.00		US 75 south (US 69 south) – Denison	Texas state line
Bryan		0.7	1.1	1	Old River Road, South Franklin Street	
Bryan	Colbert	2.2	3.5	2	SH-91 – Colbert, Denison Dam	
Bryan	Colbert	4.0	6.4	4	North Franklin Street, Leavenworth Trail	Northern end of freeway; formerly signed Platter
Bryan	Calera	8.9	14.3	8	Calera	Northbound exit and southbound entrance; southern end of freeway
Bryan	Calera	9.7	15.6	10	Main Street	
Bryan	Calera	10.6	17.1	11A	Rose Hill Road, South 9th Avenue	No southbound exit (signed at exit 11B); former US 69B/US 75B north
Bryan	Calera	10.9	17.5	11B	Choctaw Road	Signed as exits 11A-B southbound
Bryan	Calera	11.3	18.2	11C	Calera Service Road	Southbound exit and northbound entrance
Bryan	Durant	12.5– 12.8	20.1– 20.6	12	US 70 – Madill, Hugo	Signed as exits 12A (east) and 12B (west)
Bryan	Durant	14.9	24.0	14	West Main Street	Former US 70
Bryan	Durant	15.6	25.1	15	University Boulevard, Westside Drive	Southbound exit only
Bryan	Durant	15.6	25.1	15	University Boulevard, Bryan Drive	Northbound exit only; serves AllianceHealth Durant
Bryan	Durant	16.6	26.7	16	Washington Avenue	
Bryan	Durant	18.0	29.0	18	SH-48 north / SH-78 – Durant	SH-78 south is formerly part of US 69B/US 75B south
Bryan	Durant	19.2	30.9	19	Ury Drive	Formerly signed Armstrong, Durant State Fish Hatchery
Bryan		22.8	36.7	23	County Road N3760	Formerly signed Stockyard
Bryan	Caddo	27.2	43.8	26	SH-22 – Caddo, Kenefic	Northern end of freeway
Atoka	Atoka	46.3	74.5		SH-3 east / SH-7 west / SH-3 Byp. west (13th Street)	Southern end of SH-3 concurrency; eastern terminus of SH-7
Atoka	Atoka	47.2	76.0		US 75 north / SH-3 west – Coalgate, Ada	Northern end of US 75/SH-3 concurrency
Atoka	Stringtown	54.5	87.7		SH-43 east – Daisy	Southern end of SH-43 concurrency
Atoka		59.6	95.9		SH-43 west – Coalgate	Northern end of SH-43 concurrency
Atoka		70.0	112.7		SH-131 west – Wardville	
Pittsburg	Kiowa	74.5	119.9		SH-63 east (8th Street) – Pittsburg, Haileyville	
Pittsburg	Savanna	82.7	133.1	82	U.S. Army Ammunition Plant	Interchange
Pittsburg		85.7– 85.9	137.9– 138.2		Indian Nation Turnpike – Henryetta, Tulsa, Antlers, Hugo	Indian Nation Turnpike exit 63
Pittsburg	McAlester	87.8	141.3	87	US 69 Bus. north – McAlester	Interchange; no northbound entrance
Pittsburg	McAlester	89.7	144.4	89	Village Boulevard	Southern end of freeway
Pittsburg	McAlester	90.3	145.3	90	Peaceable Road, Comanche Avenue	
Pittsburg	McAlester	91.5– 91.7	147.3– 147.6	91	US 270 / SH-1 / SH-31 – McAlester, Krebs, Wilburton	Signed as exits 91A (east) and 91B (west)
Pittsburg	McAlester	92.2	148.4	92	Electric Avenue	Serves McAlester Regional Health Center
Pittsburg	McAlester	93.4	150.3	93	Hereford Lane	Northern end of freeway
Pittsburg		96.4	155.1	96	US 69 Bus. south / SH-113 north – Indianola, McAlester	Southern end of freeway
Pittsburg		99.8	160.6	100	Shady Grove Road	Formerly Coal Creek Road
Pittsburg		102.8	165.4	103	Rock Creek Road	
Pittsburg		105.3	169.5	106	Nale Road, Crowder	
Pittsburg	Canadian	110.7	178.2	109	SH-113 – Canadian, Indianola, Arrowhead State Park	
Pittsburg		114.7	184.6	113	SH-9A east to SH-9 – Carlton Landing, Stigler	
McIntosh		118.2	190.2		US 69 Bus. north – Eufaula	Northbound exit and southbound entrance
McIntosh	Eufaula	120.9	194.6		SH-9 – Eufaula, Wetumka	
McIntosh		121.4	195.4		US 69 Bus. south – Eufaula	
McIntosh		125.8	202.5		SH-150 / Texanna Road – Lake Eufaula State Park	
McIntosh		128.6	207.0		Onapa Road	
McIntosh		132.6– 133.1	213.4– 214.2		I-40 (US 69 Bus. north) – Oklahoma City, Fort Smith	I-40 exits 264 A–B
McIntosh	Checotah	133.9	215.5		US 266 – Checotah	
McIntosh	Checotah	135.9	218.7		US 69 Bus. south – Checotah, Rentiesville	
Muskogee		141.6	227.9		Oktaha, Rentiesville	
Muskogee		144.2	232.1		Wainwright	
Muskogee		150.6	242.4		Summit	At-grade intersection; northern end of freeway; former US 69 south
Muskogee	Muskogee	152.9	246.1		US 64 east to SH-165 (Peak Boulevard) – Tahlequah	Interchange; southern end of US 64 concurrency
Muskogee	Muskogee	155.9	250.9		US 62 west / US 64 west / SH-16 west / US 62 Bus. east / US 64 Bus. east (Okmulgee Avenue)	Northern end of US 64 concurrency; southern end of US 62/SH-16 concurrency
Muskogee	Muskogee	156.9	252.5		US 62 east / SH-16 east (Shawnee Bypass) – Tahlequah	Northern end of US 62/SH-16 concurrency
Wagoner		161.7	260.2		SH-51B west – Porter	
Wagoner		161.9	260.6		Muskogee Turnpike – Tulsa, Fort Smith	SH-351 exit 26
Wagoner	Wagoner	170.3	274.1		SH-51 – Coweta, Wagoner	
Mayes	Chouteau	185.0– 185.2	297.7– 298.1		Future I-42 / US 412 – Locust Grove, Tulsa	Interchange
Mayes		190.9	307.2		SH-69A east – MidAmerica Industrial Park	
Mayes	Pryor	195.2	314.1		SH-20 (Graham Avenue)	
Mayes	Adair	204.7	329.4		SH-28 (Main Street) – Chelsea, Langley	
Craig	Big Cabin	214.4	345.0		I-44 Toll / Will Rogers Turnpike – Joplin, Tulsa	I-44 exit 283
Craig		218.7	352.0		US 60 west – Chelsea	Southern end of US 60 concurrency
Craig	Vinita	222.5	358.1		SH-2 north (Wilson Street)	Southern terminus of SH-2
Craig		223.5	359.7		I-44 Toll / Will Rogers Turnpike – Joplin, Tulsa	I-44 exit 289
Craig		227.9	366.8		SH-82 south – Langley	
Delaware		232.4	374.0		SH-85 south – Bernice	Northern terminus of SH-85
Ottawa	Afton	239.7	385.8		US 59 south – Grove	Southern end of US 59 concurrency
Ottawa		240.4	386.9		US 60 east	Interchange; northern end of US 60 concurrency
Ottawa		240.6	387.2		I-44 Toll / Will Rogers Turnpike – Joplin, Tulsa	I-44 exit 302
Ottawa	Narcissa	246.3	396.4		SH-25 west (150 Road) – Bluejacket	Eastern terminus of SH-25
Ottawa	Dotyville	250.6	403.3		US 59 north / SH-10 west – Welch, Lenapah	Northern end of US 59 concurrency; southern end of SH-10 concurrency
Ottawa	Miami	252.4	406.2		SH-125 south (Main Street) – Fairland, Grove	Northern terminus of SH-125; does not intersect US 69 south ('A' Street SW)
Ottawa	Miami	252.5	406.4		SH-10 east (Steve Owens Boulevard)	Northern end of SH-10 concurrency
Ottawa	Commerce	259.0	416.8		SH-69A south to I-44 Toll / Will Rogers Turnpike	Northern terminus of SH-69A
Ottawa		259.6	417.8		US 69 Alt. north – Quapaw	
Ottawa		260.82	419.75		US-69 north / K-7 north – Columbus	Kansas state line
1.000 mi = 1.609 km; 1.000 km = 0.621 mi: Concurrency terminus; Electronic toll collection; Incomplete access; Proposed

U.S. Route 69
Previous state: Texas	Oklahoma	Next state: Kansas
