= National Register of Historic Places listings in Pittsburg County, Oklahoma =

Location of Pittsburg County in Oklahoma

This is a list of the National Register of Historic Places listings in Pittsburg County, Oklahoma.

This is intended to be a complete list of the properties and districts on the National Register of Historic Places in Pittsburg County, Oklahoma, United States. The locations of National Register properties and districts for which the latitude and longitude coordinates are included below, may be seen in a map.

There are 30 properties and districts listed on the National Register in the county. Another property was once listed but has been removed.

This National Park Service list is complete through NPS recent listings posted April 3, 2026.

== Current listings ==
	Name on the Register	Image	Date listed	Location	City or town	Description
1	Aldridge Hotel	Aldridge Hotel	December 7, 1995 (#95001408)	200 E. Carl Albert Parkway; 34°55′56″N 95°46′00″W	McAlester	
2	Blackburn's Station Site	Blackburn's Station Site	March 7, 1973 (#73001568)	9 miles southeast of Pittsburg; 34°41′05″N 95°44′39″W	Pittsburg	
3	Busby Office Building	Busby Office Building	December 6, 1979 (#79002021)	113 E. Carl Albert Parkway; 34°55′59″N 95°46′03″W	McAlester	
4	Busby Theatre	Busby Theatre	December 6, 1979 (#79002022)	Washington Ave. and 2nd St. 34°56′01″N 95°46′00″W	McAlester	Demolished in 1983
5	Canadian Jail and Livery Stable		November 6, 1980 (#80003295)	Off State Highway 113; 35°10′43″N 95°39′22″W	Canadian	
6	Choate Cabin	Choate Cabin	October 3, 1979 (#79002019)	2nd and Walnut Sts. 35°09′36″N 95°46′24″W	Indianola	
7	Cole Chapel School	Cole Chapel School	September 8, 1988 (#88001411)	North of Hartshorne; 34°54′19″N 95°32′32″W	Hartshorne	
8	Federal Building and US Courthouse	Federal Building and US Courthouse	March 24, 2000 (#00000242)	301 E. Carl Albert Pkwy. 34°55′56″N 95°45′54″W	McAlester	
9	First Presbyterian Church	First Presbyterian Church	December 11, 1979 (#79003139)	101 E. Washington Ave. 34°56′03″N 95°46′03″W	McAlester	
10	Hokey's Drugstore		December 6, 1979 (#79002020)	2 E. Washington Ave. 34°55′39″N 95°42′56″W	Krebs	
11	International Temple, Supreme Assembly, Order of the Rainbow for Girls	International Temple, Supreme Assembly, Order of the Rainbow for Girls	June 14, 2013 (#13000393)	315 E. Carl Albert Pkwy. 34°55′57″N 95°45′53″W	McAlester	
12	L'Ouverture Gymnasium	L'Ouverture Gymnasium	May 26, 2006 (#06000486)	Junction of S. 14th St. and E Chickasaw Ave. 34°55′32″N 95°45′02″W	McAlester	
13	Jeff Lee Park Bath House and Pool	Jeff Lee Park Bath House and Pool	September 8, 1988 (#88001413)	3rd and Fillmore Sts. 34°56′41″N 95°45′37″W	McAlester	
14	Mass Grave of the Mexican Miners		November 14, 1980 (#80003297)	Mount Calvary Cemetery; 34°55′39″N 95°44′32″W	McAlester	
15	McAlester Armory	McAlester Armory	September 8, 1988 (#88001412)	3rd and Polk Sts. 34°56′36″N 95°45′38″W	McAlester	
16	McAlester Downtown Historic District	McAlester Downtown Historic District	March 10, 2015 (#15000065)	Bounded by Business 69, E. Carl Albert Pkwy., N. 5th St. & RR tracks 34°55′53″N 95°45′58″W	McAlester	
17	McAlester DX		August 29, 1980 (#80004288)	5th St. and Carl Albert Parkway; 34°55′56″N 95°45′50″W	McAlester	Demolished
18	McAlester House	McAlester House	August 29, 1980 (#80004289)	14 E. Smith Ave. 34°57′20″N 95°45′38″W	McAlester	
19	McAlester Scottish Rite Temple	McAlester Scottish Rite Temple	November 22, 1980 (#80004521)	2nd St. and Adams Ave. 34°56′07″N 95°45′56″W	McAlester	
20	Mine Rescue Station Building	Mine Rescue Station Building	March 13, 1980 (#80004290)	509 S. 3rd St. 34°55′34″N 95°46′05″W	McAlester	
21	New State School		September 8, 1988 (#88001414)	South of Hartshorne near North Fork Elm Creek; 34°43′50″N 95°36′05″W	Hartshorne	
22	OKLA Theater	OKLA Theater	June 5, 2003 (#03000513)	18 E. Choctaw; 34°55′55″N 95°46′09″W	McAlester	
23	Perryville		May 5, 1972 (#72001076)	Southwest of McAlester on U.S. Route 69; 34°52′08″N 95°48′54″W	McAlester	
24	Pittsburg County Courthouse	Pittsburg County Courthouse	August 23, 1984 (#84003415)	115 E. Carl Albert Pkwy. 34°55′59″N 95°46′02″W	McAlester	
25	Pittsburg School and Gymnasium	Pittsburg School and Gymnasium	September 8, 1988 (#88001415)	Off State Highway 63; 34°42′55″N 95°51′14″W	Pittsburg	
26	Rock Creek Bridge		September 4, 2008 (#08000853)	Carries County Road NS-409.7 over Rock Creek; 34°38′56″N 95°43′56″W	Blanco	
27	St. Joseph's Catholic Church	St. Joseph's Catholic Church	November 12, 1980 (#80003296)	Off State Highway 31; 34°55′56″N 95°43′05″W	Krebs	
28	Saints Cyril and Methodius Russian Orthodox Greek Catholic Church	Saints Cyril and Methodius Russian Orthodox Greek Catholic Church	September 8, 2017 (#100001594)	501 S. 3rd St. 34°50′36″N 95°34′13″W	Hartshorne	
29	Tipton Ridge School		September 8, 1988 (#88001417)	North of Blocker; 35°07′15″N 95°30′26″W	Blocker	
30	Warden's House		June 17, 2005 (#05000615)	Penitentiary Boulevard and West St. 34°57′09″N 95°46′55″W	McAlester	

== Former listings ==
	Name on the Register	Image	Date listed	Date removed	Location	City or town	Description
1	Southern Ice and Cold Storage Company		October 11, 1979 (#79002023)	June 2, 2014	338 E. Choctaw Ave. 34°55′51″N 95°45′49″W	Pittsburg	

== See also ==
- List of National Historic Landmarks in Oklahoma
- National Register of Historic Places listings in Oklahoma
