= Canadian Shores, Oklahoma =

- Census-designated place
- Location within Oklahoma Location within the United States
- Coordinates: 35°10′27″N 95°44′33″W
- Country: United States
- State: Oklahoma
- County: Pittsburg

Area
  - Total: 1.24 sq mi (3.21 km^{2})
  - Land: 1.05 sq mi (2.73 km^{2})
  - Water: 0.18 sq mi (0.47 km^{2})
- Elevation: 646 ft (197 m)

Population (2020)
  - Total: 233
  - Density: 221.0/sq mi (85.31/km^{2})
- Time zone: UTC-6 (Central (CST))
  - Summer (DST): UTC-5 (CDT)
- ZIP Code: 74501 (McAlester)
- Area codes: 918/539
- FIPS code: 40-11530
- GNIS feature ID: 2812867

Canadian Shores is an unincorporated community and census-designated place (CDP) in Pittsburg County, Oklahoma, United States. It was first listed as a CDP prior to the 2020 census. As of the 2020 census, Canadian Shores had a population of 233.

The CDP is in northern Pittsburg County, on the south side of the Canadian River and the inundation zone of Eufaula Lake. It is on the north side of Oklahoma State Highway 113, which leads west 2 miles (3 km) to Indianola and east 5 miles (8 km) to Canadian. McAlester, the Pittsburg county seat, is 20 miles (32 km) to the south via Highway 113.

== Demographics ==
Historical population
Census	Pop.	Note	%±
2020	233		—
U.S. Decennial Census

=== 2020 census ===
As of the 2020 census, Canadian Shores had a population of 233. The median age was 37.4 years. 24.9% of residents were under the age of 18 and 17.2% of residents were 65 years of age or older. For every 100 females there were 102.6 males, and for every 100 females age 18 and over there were 92.3 males age 18 and over.

0.0% of residents lived in urban areas, while 100.0% lived in rural areas.

There were 92 households in Canadian Shores, of which 28.3% had children under the age of 18 living in them. Of all households, 43.5% were married-couple households, 23.9% were households with a male householder and no spouse or partner present, and 21.7% were households with a female householder and no spouse or partner present. About 35.9% of all households were made up of individuals and 23.9% had someone living alone who was 65 years of age or older.

There were 120 housing units, of which 23.3% were vacant. The homeowner vacancy rate was 7.0% and the rental vacancy rate was 0.0%.

Racial composition as of the 2020 census
Race	Number	Percent
White	135	57.9%
Black or African American	2	0.9%
American Indian and Alaska Native	53	22.7%
Asian	1	0.4%
Native Hawaiian and Other Pacific Islander	0	0.0%
Some other race	0	0.0%
Two or more races	42	18.0%
Hispanic or Latino (of any race)	9	3.9%
