= Adel, Oklahoma =

Unincorporated community in Oklahoma, US

Coordinates: 34°34′45″N 95°35′40″W

Adel is an unincorporated community in northwestern Pushmataha County, Oklahoma, United States. It is 12 miles west of Clayton.

Using the Public Land Survey System commonly in use in Oklahoma, its coordinates are T13-3S-R16E.

Prior to Oklahoma's statehood, Adel was located in Jack's Fork County, a part of the Pushmataha District of the Choctaw Nation.

Adel, Indian Territory, was granted a United States Post Office on June 3, 1907. It closed on November 15, 1954. Adel is isolated; the nearest communities are Daisy and Goss in Atoka County. Goss had a larger school, and Goss Schoolhouse still stands as a sturdy testament to its more prosperous times.

No landmarks remain extant in Adel except for a small cemetery containing five graves. Only one grave, that of a county sheriff from the old Choctaw Nation, bears a marker and it is dated 1880.

Adel's relative isolation was broken with the opening of the Indian Nation Turnpike in 1970, which features an interchange for Daisy. Upon completion of Sardis Lake, near Clayton, the state opened a paved highway, Oklahoma State Highway 43, from the Daisy interchange on the Turnpike to Sardis Lake, passing over its dam to meet Oklahoma State Highway 2.

At this writing, tourism at the lake has not been vigorously promoted and the lake does not generate much tourist traffic, either through Adel or elsewhere. That, however, may yet come to pass.

More information on Adel may be found in the Pushmataha County Historical Society.
