= Indian Nation Turnpike =

Toll road in Oklahoma

Indian Nation Turnpike
- The Indian Nation Turnpike highlighted in red

Route information
- Maintained by Oklahoma Turnpike Authority
- Length: 105.2 mi (169.3 km)
- Existed: 1966–present
- Component highways: SH-375 entire length

Major junctions
- South end: US 70 / US 271 near Hugo
- SH-3 / SH-7 in Antlers; US 69 in McAlester; US 270 / SH-1 in McAlester; SH-9 near Dustin
- North end: I-40 / US 62 / US 75 in Henryetta

Location
- Country: United States
- State: Oklahoma
- Counties: Choctaw, Pushmataha, Atoka, Pittsburg, McIntosh, Okmulgee

Highway system
- Oklahoma State Highway System; Interstate; US; State; Turnpikes

The Indian Nation Turnpike, also designated State Highway 375 (SH-375), is a controlled-access toll road in southeastern Oklahoma, United States, running between Hugo and Henryetta, a distance of 105.2 miles (169.3 km). It is the longest tollway in the state.

== Route description ==
The Indian Nation Turnpike is built to parkway-like design standards, omitting a center barrier and left-hand shoulders for a slightly mounded grassy median that is flush with the edge of the left lane in each direction. However, the median is slowly being upgraded to a cable barrier with left shoulders bordering it. The turnpike's speed limit is 80 mph (130 km/h) from I-40 south to north of US-270/OK-1, and from there to the southern terminus it is 75 mph (120 km/h).

Law enforcement along the Indian Nation Turnpike is provided by Oklahoma Highway Patrol Troop XC, a special troop assigned to the turnpike.

The only service plaza along the entire turnpike is located just north of the US 69 exit near McAlester. Service plazas formerly existed near the Antlers and OK-9 exits before the one near McAlester opened.

== History ==
The route is one continuous four-lane limited access highway, but consists of two separately constructed sections. The 41.1-mile (66.1 km) northern section, which opened in 1966, is the portion between I-40/US 62/US 75 near Henryetta and US 69 south of McAlester. The southern extension opened in 1970, and is the 64.1-mile (103.2 km) segment from the US 69 junction to US 70/271 in Hugo.

On December 2, 2014, the Oklahoma Turnpike Authority approved funds to reconstruct the Eufaula interchange, demolishing the Eufaula service plaza and relocating the toll plaza to where the service plaza once stood. The interchange previously had the highest accident rate of all Oklahoma's turnpikes. The funds also went towards demolishing the Antlers service plaza. A new service plaza opened north of the McAlester interchange on December 19, 2014, containing a McDonald's and a Love's convenience store.

The Indian Nation Turnpike originally bore no numbered designation. On August 2, 2021, the Oklahoma Transportation Commission unanimously approved a motion to apply the SH-375 designation to the turnpike. ODOT Director Tim Gatz stated in the Transportation Commission meeting that the numbering addition was primarily to aid in navigation using digital mapping and routing applications.

== Tolls ==
There are three mainline toll plazas, one just north of the OK-9/Eufaula exit, one just south of the US 69 exit near McAlester, and one within the Antlers exit. The toll plaza at the Eufaula exit has two high-speed Pikepass lanes, with one in each direction. These lanes do not have access to OK-9. To access the OK-9 exit from the southbound lanes, motorists must exit into the cash lanes and then exit the cash lanes before the mainline tollbooths (conversely motorists using the northbound turnpike entrance from OK-9 must merge with the cash lanes before merging back with the Pikepass lanes).

A two-axle vehicle pays $16.74 ($7.31 with Pikepass and other compatible systems) to drive the full length of the turnpike.

== Exit list ==
County	Location	mi	km	Exit	Destinations	Notes
Choctaw	Hugo	0.0	0.0	1	US 70 west / US 271 north – Hugo	Last free exit northbound; southbound continuation
Pushmataha	Antlers	15.4	24.8	Toll Gantry		
Pushmataha	Antlers	16.0	25.7	16	SH-3 / SH-7 – Antlers, Atoka	
Pushmataha	Antlers	16.4	26.4	Antlers Service Plaza (demolished 2014)		
Pushmataha	Antlers	17.3	27.8	Toll Gantry		
Atoka	Daisy	38.4	61.8	38	SH-43 – Atoka, Daisy, Stringtown	
Pittsburg	Blanco	54.9	88.4	54	SH-63 – Blanco	Interchange under construction
Pittsburg	McAlester	63.1	101.5	Toll Gantry		
Pittsburg	McAlester	63.3	101.9	63	US 69 – McAlester, Eufaula, Muskogee, Atoka, Durant	Signed as exits 63B (south) and 63A (north) southbound
Pittsburg	McAlester	66.8	107.5	McAlester Service Plaza (opened 2014)		
Pittsburg	McAlester	69.9	112.5	70	US 270 / SH-1 – McAlester, Calvin	Tolled northbound exit and southbound entrance
Pittsburg		73.1	117.6	73	Tannehil Road	Future interchange
Pittsburg		81.4	131.0	82	Canadian, Indianola	Tolled northbound exit and southbound entrance
McIntosh		92.2	148.4	92	SH-9 – Dustin, Eufaula	Mainline toll gantry located just after exit in both directions
McIntosh		92.5	148.9	Eufaula Service Plaza (demolished 2014)		
Okmulgee	Henryetta	104.4	168.0	104A	I-40 east – Fort Smith	Last free exit southbound; I-40 exit 240A
Okmulgee	Henryetta	104.7	168.5	104B	I-40 west / US 62 west / US 75 south – Oklahoma City	Turnpike ends; northbound continuation as US 62/75
Okmulgee	Henryetta	105.2	169.3		E. Main St.	Freeway ends
1.000 mi = 1.609 km; 1.000 km = 0.621 mi: Electronic toll collection; Closed/former; Unopened

== See also ==
- Oklahoma Turnpike Authority
- Pikepass
