= Oklahoma State Highway 150 =

State highway in Oklahoma, United States

State Highway 150
- SH-150 highlighted in red

Route information
- Maintained by ODOT
- Length: 8.77 mi (14.11 km)
- Existed: ca. 1964–present

Major junctions
- South end: US 69 north of Eufaula
- North end: I-40 west of Checotah

Location
- Country: United States
- State: Oklahoma

Highway system
- Oklahoma State Highway System; Interstate; US; State; Turnpikes
← SH-149	→ SH-151

State Highway 150 (abbreviated SH-150) is a state highway in McIntosh County, Oklahoma, in the United States. It is 8.77 miles (14.11 km) long, running diagonally from U.S. Highway 69 north of Eufaula in the southeast to Interstate 40 west of Checotah in the northwest. SH-150 provides access to Lake Eufaula and Lake Eufaula State Park. It has no lettered spur routes.

SH-150 was established in the mid-1960s as a spur route connecting I-40 to the parklands surrounding Lake Eufaula. In the early 1970s, it was extended to reconnect with the state highway system, as it does today, at its south end.

== Route description ==
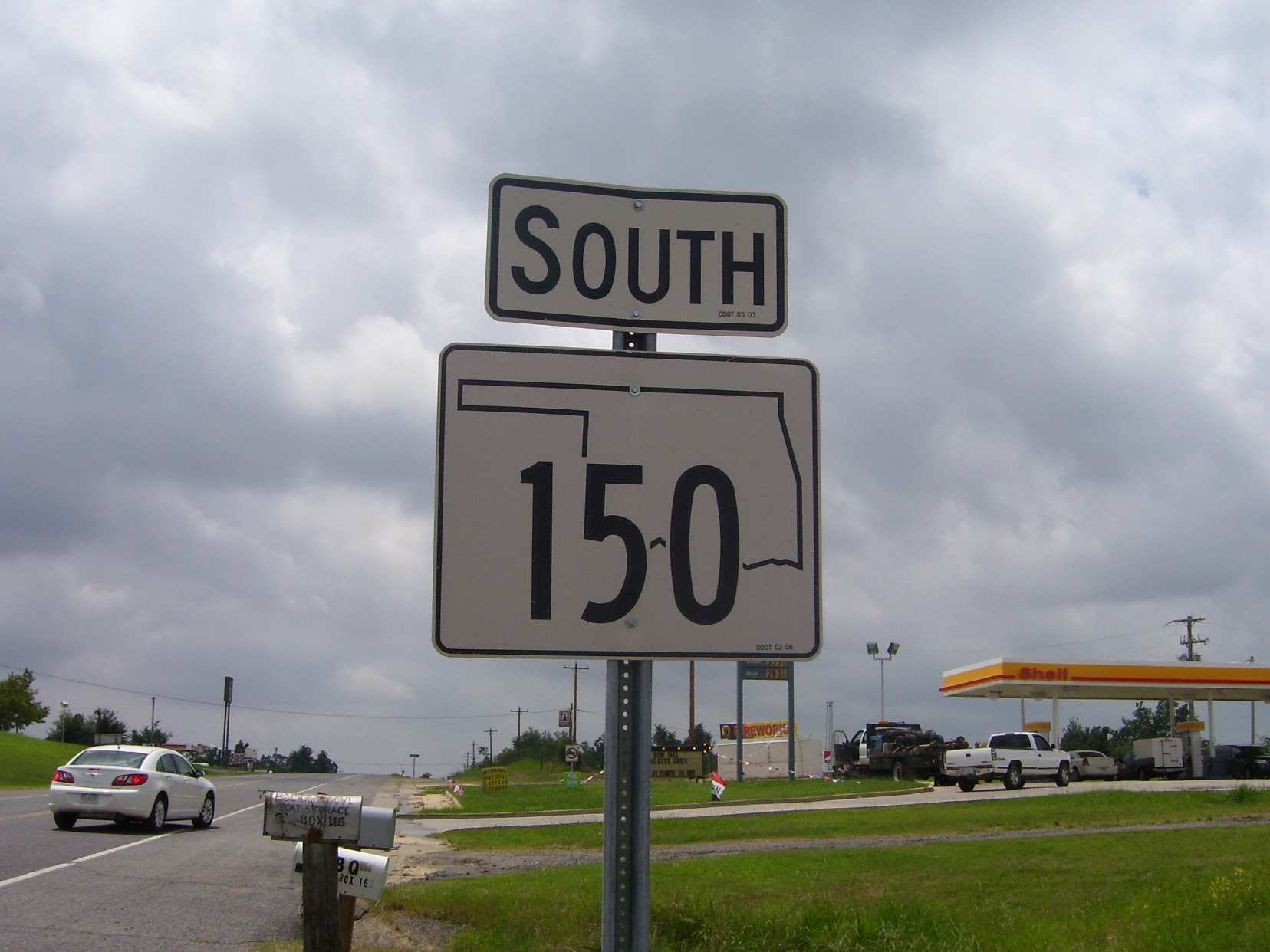
SH-150 shield just south of I-40

State Highway 150 begins at an interchange with U.S. 69 north of Eufaula. East of the freeway, the roadbed continues as Texanna Road. From the interchange, SH-150 angles northeast, crossing the Deep Fork River arm of Eufaula Lake. Upon reaching the shore, the highway enters Lake Eufaula State Park and turns due north. The highway provides access to Fountainhead Lodge Airpark, then curves around to the west. A sharp turn shortly thereafter turns the highway back to the north. SH-150 then passes through Brush Hill and leaves the state park. The highway turns northwest to avoid the lake, then turns back to the north before coming to an end at Interstate 40 exit 259.

== History ==
State Highway 150 first appeared on the 1965 Oklahoma highway map. The highway originally served as a spur from Interstate 40 (the adjacent section of which appeared on the state map at the same time as SH-150) to Fountainhead State Park, as Eufaula State Park was known at the time. By 1971, SH-150 was extended southeastward, connecting to US-69. No further changes to the highway have occurred since that time.

== Junction list ==
The entire route is in McIntosh County.

Location	mi	km	Destinations	Notes
	0.00	0.00	US 69	Southern terminus; diamond interchange
	8.77	14.11	I-40	Northern terminus; I-40 exit 259; diamond interchange
1.000 mi = 1.609 km; 1.000 km = 0.621 mi
