= Oktaha, Oklahoma =

Oktaha, Oklahoma Oktahv (Creek)
- Town
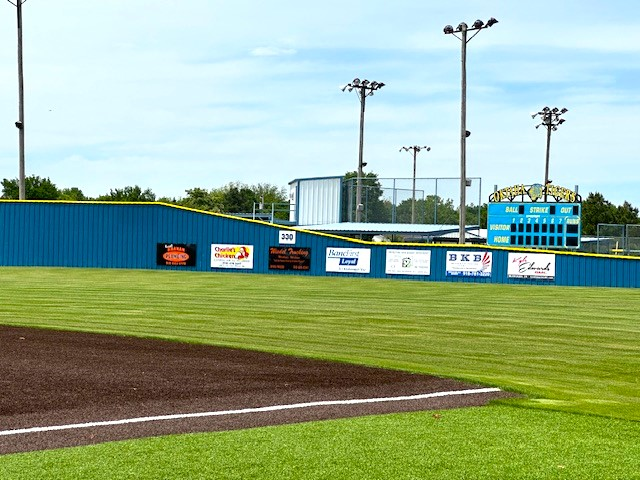
- Athletic field at the Oktaha school complex in May 2025

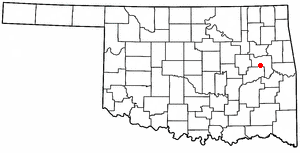
- Location in Oklahoma
- Coordinates: 35°34′39″N 95°28′40″W
- Country: United States
- State: Oklahoma
- County: Muskogee

Area
  - Total: 0.27 sq mi (0.71 km^{2})
  - Land: 0.27 sq mi (0.71 km^{2})
  - Water: 0 sq mi (0.00 km^{2})
- Elevation: 597 ft (182 m)

Population (2020)
  - Total: 343
  - Density: 1,256.6/sq mi (485.17/km^{2})
- Time zone: UTC-6 (Central (CST))
  - Summer (DST): UTC-5 (CDT)
- ZIP Code: 74450
- Area codes: 539/918
- FIPS code: 40-55200
- GNIS feature ID: 2413077

Oktaha (Creek: Oktahv) is a town in Muskogee County, Oklahoma, United States. As of the 2020 census, the population was 343.

== History ==
Oktaha was named for a Muscogee chief, Oktarharsars Harjo (also known as Sands). The town originated in 1872 as a stop on the MK&T "Katy" Railroad. By 1900, the town had its own post office; a small business district emerged as well. Local business was lagging, however, by mid-century, and the town struggled even more when U.S. Highway 69 was rerouted to bypass Oktaha. Nevertheless, Oktaha remains the site of a K-12 school that draws several hundred students from rural portions of Muskogee County.

== Geography ==
Oktaha is located 14 miles (23 km) south-southwest of Muskogee. U.S. Highway 69 passes 1 mile (1.6 km) west of town, leading north to Muskogee and south 7 miles (11 km) to Checotah.

According to the U.S. Census Bureau, the town has a total area of 0.27 square miles (0.70 km^{2}), all land. The town is within the watershed of Anderson Creek, a south-flowing tributary of Dirty Creek, which leads east to the Arkansas River at Robert S. Kerr Reservoir.

== Demographics ==
Historical population
Census	Pop.	Note	%±
1910	324		—
1920	335		3.4%
1930	292		−12.8%
1940	233		−20.2%
1950	207		−11.2%
1960	199		−3.9%
1970	193		−3.0%
1980	376		94.8%
1990	266		−29.3%
2000	327		22.9%
2010	390		19.3%
2020	343		−12.1%
U.S. Decennial Census

=== 2020 census ===
As of the 2020 census, Oktaha had a population of 343. The median age was 34.2 years. 30.0% of residents were under the age of 18 and 13.4% of residents were 65 years of age or older. For every 100 females there were 88.5 males, and for every 100 females age 18 and over there were 84.6 males age 18 and over.

0.0% of residents lived in urban areas, while 100.0% lived in rural areas.

There were 122 households in Oktaha, of which 45.1% had children under the age of 18 living in them. Of all households, 52.5% were married-couple households, 19.7% were households with a male householder and no spouse or partner present, and 20.5% were households with a female householder and no spouse or partner present. About 20.5% of all households were made up of individuals and 8.2% had someone living alone who was 65 years of age or older.

There were 141 housing units, of which 13.5% were vacant. The homeowner vacancy rate was 0.0% and the rental vacancy rate was 7.9%.

Racial composition as of the 2020 census
Race	Number	Percent
White	201	58.6%
Black or African American	3	0.9%
American Indian and Alaska Native	105	30.6%
Asian	0	0.0%
Native Hawaiian and Other Pacific Islander	0	0.0%
Some other race	0	0.0%
Two or more races	34	9.9%
Hispanic or Latino (of any race)	6	1.7%

=== 2000 census ===
As of the census of 2000, there were 327 people, 110 households, and 91 families residing in the town. The population density was 1,256.2 inhabitants per square mile (485.0/km^{2}). There were 127 housing units at an average density of 487.9 per square mile (188.4/km^{2}). The racial makeup of the town was 70.95% White, 3.36% African American, 16.82% Native American, 0.61% Asian, 0.31% from other races, and 7.95% from two or more races. Hispanic or Latino of any race were 0.31% of the population.

There were 110 households, out of which 41.8% had children under the age of 18 living with them, 60.0% were married couples living together, 19.1% had a female householder with no husband present, and 16.4% were non-families. 13.6% of all households were made up of individuals, and 5.5% had someone living alone who was 65 years of age or older. The average household size was 2.97 and the average family size was 3.25.

In the town, the population was spread out, with 31.5% under the age of 18, 8.9% from 18 to 24, 30.0% from 25 to 44, 18.3% from 45 to 64, and 11.3% who were 65 years of age or older. The median age was 32 years. For every 100 females, there were 95.8 males. For every 100 females age 18 and over, there were 83.6 males.

The median income for a household in the town was $24,844, and the median income for a family was $30,556. Males had a median income of $23,958 versus $21,250 for females. The per capita income for the town was $11,174. About 18.5% of families and 19.1% of the population were below the poverty line, including 24.1% of those under age 18 and none of those age 65 or over.

== Notable people ==
- The noted Native American sculptor Willard Stone was born in Oktaha in 1916.
