= Texanna, Oklahoma =

- Census-designated place
- Location within Oklahoma Location within the United States
- Coordinates: 35°21′26″N 95°30′17″W
- Country: United States
- State: Oklahoma
- County: McIntosh

Area
  - Total: 39.95 sq mi (103.48 km^{2})
  - Land: 39.70 sq mi (102.82 km^{2})
  - Water: 0.25 sq mi (0.66 km^{2})
- Elevation: 702 ft (214 m)

Population (2020)
  - Total: 2,293
  - Density: 58/sq mi (22.3/km^{2})
- Time zone: UTC-6 (Central (CST))
  - Summer (DST): UTC-5 (CDT)
- ZIP Codes: 74426 (Checotah); 74432 (Eufaula)
- Area codes: 539/918
- FIPS code: 40-72950
- GNIS feature ID: 2410073

Texanna is an unincorporated community and census-designated place (CDP) in McIntosh County, Oklahoma, United States. As of the 2020 census, the community had 2,293 residents.

Established in District 12 of the old Indian Territory, its post office existed from June 27, 1888, until July 16, 1940. Texanna's population in the 1905 Territorial Census was 200. It is said to have been named for a settlement of Texas Cherokees. Residents of Texanna now have a Eufaula or Checotah postal address.

== Geography ==
Texanna lies roughly east-southeast of Henryetta, being south of Interstate 40, east of U.S. Route 69, and on the north shore of Lake Eufaula.

According to the U.S. Census Bureau, the CDP has a total area of 40.0 square miles (104 km^{2}), of which 39.7 square miles (103 km^{2}) are land and 0.3 square miles (0.8 km^{2}), or 0.64%, are water.

== Demographics ==
Historical population
Census	Pop.	Note	%±
2000	2,083		—
2010	2,261		8.5%
2020	2,293		1.4%
U.S. Decennial Census

=== 2020 census ===
As of the 2020 census, Texanna had a population of 2,293. The median age was 54.9 years. 15.5% of residents were under the age of 18 and 33.4% of residents were 65 years of age or older. For every 100 females there were 96.2 males, and for every 100 females age 18 and over there were 93.3 males age 18 and over.

0.0% of residents lived in urban areas, while 100.0% lived in rural areas.

There were 1,009 households in Texanna, of which 20.5% had children under the age of 18 living in them. Of all households, 51.5% were married-couple households, 20.3% were households with a male householder and no spouse or partner present, and 23.2% were households with a female householder and no spouse or partner present. About 26.8% of all households were made up of individuals and 15.3% had someone living alone who was 65 years of age or older.

There were 1,846 housing units, of which 45.3% were vacant. The homeowner vacancy rate was 2.5% and the rental vacancy rate was 16.3%.

Racial composition as of the 2020 census
Race	Number	Percent
White	1,757	76.6%
Black or African American	29	1.3%
American Indian and Alaska Native	266	11.6%
Asian	4	0.2%
Native Hawaiian and Other Pacific Islander	0	0.0%
Some other race	16	0.7%
Two or more races	221	9.6%
Hispanic or Latino (of any race)	49	2.1%

=== 2000 census ===
As of the census of 2000, there were 2,083 people, 928 households, and 668 families residing in the CDP. The population density was 52.2 inhabitants per square mile (20.2/km^{2}). There were 1,763 housing units at an average density of 44.1 per square mile (17.0/km^{2}). The racial makeup of the CDP was 82.14% White, 0.67% African American, 12.43% Native American, 0.10% Asian, 0.19% from other races, and 4.46% from two or more races. Hispanic or Latino of any race were 1.10% of the population.

There were 928 households, out of which 20.7% had children under the age of 18 living with them, 60.1% were married couples living together, 8.2% had a female householder with no husband present, and 28.0% were non-families. 25.5% of all households were made up of individuals, and 13.6% had someone living alone who was 65 years of age or older. The average household size was 2.24 and the average family size was 2.65.

In the CDP, the population was spread out, with 19.3% under the age of 18, 4.8% from 18 to 24, 20.4% from 25 to 44, 30.6% from 45 to 64, and 25.0% who were 65 years of age or older. The median age was 49 years. For every 100 females, there were 95.4 males. For every 100 females age 18 and over, there were 95.7 males.

The median income for a household in the CDP was $27,653, and the median income for a family was $31,314. Males had a median income of $30,494 versus $15,875 for females. The per capita income for the CDP was $17,433. About 11.4% of families and 14.5% of the population were below the poverty line, including 13.6% of those under age 18 and 13.9% of those age 65 or over.
