= Savanna, Oklahoma =

- Town
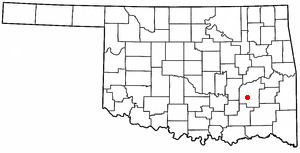
- Location of Savanna, Oklahoma
- Coordinates: 34°50′08″N 95°50′08″W
- Country: United States
- State: Oklahoma
- County: Pittsburg

Area
  - Total: 1.44 sq mi (3.73 km^{2})
  - Land: 1.43 sq mi (3.71 km^{2})
  - Water: 0.0077 sq mi (0.02 km^{2})
- Elevation: 745 ft (227 m)

Population (2020)
  - Total: 623
  - Density: 435.2/sq mi (168.03/km^{2})
- Time zone: UTC-6 (Central (CST))
  - Summer (DST): UTC-5 (CDT)
- ZIP code: 74565
- Area codes: 539/918
- FIPS code: 40-65600
- GNIS feature ID: 2413262
- Website: cityofsavanna.municipalimpact.com

Savanna is a town in Pittsburg County, Oklahoma, United States. As of the 2020 census, Savanna had a population of 623. It is the hometown of former Harlem Globetrotter and 2014 NAIA Dunk Champion Tyler Inman.

== History ==
Begun as a rural settlement in Tobucksy County, Choctaw Nation during the 1860s, the community's economy was based on agriculture and cattle ranching. Coal mining became the most important economic activity during the 1870s.

A post office was established at Savanna, Indian Territory on May 5, 1876. The town owed its existence to the Missouri, Kansas and Texas Railroad, for which it was a station stop, and the new post office was named for the private railroad car used by Robert Stevens, general manager of the railroad.

As coal mining developed, the community became one of the largest in Indian Territory. The mining companies built rows of 2- and 3- bedroom houses for the families of the miners. In 1887, accidental explosions in Mines #1 and #2 killed 6 miners and 12 rescue personnel. The Savanna Coal Mining and Trading Company closed its mines and moved the houses it owned to Lehigh, Oklahoma. Some growth continued, and Savanna boasted 450 residents in 1911. The Savanna News began publishing in 1915, but went out of business before the end of the decade.

However, the demand for coal fell, as the country began shifting to oil and gas as preferred fuels. Coal mining never regained its former importance to Pittsburg County after WWI. Savanna's boom essentially collapsed until after statehood came in 1907.

During World War II, the U.S. Navy constructed an ammunition production facility at McAlester. Many of Savanna's work force went to work there. In 1960, the census reported a population of 620, which grew to 948 in 1990.

One notable graduate of Savanna High School is former Harlem Globetrotter and 2014 NAIA Dunk Champion Tyler Inman.

== Geography ==
Savanna is located at 34°50′0″N 95°50′20″W (34.833229, -95.838768). It is 9 miles (14 km) south of McAlester on U.S. Highway 69. According to the United States Census Bureau, the town has a total area of 1.4 square miles (3.6 km^{2}), of which 1.4 square miles (3.6 km^{2}) is land and 0.71% is water.

== Demographics ==
Historical population
Census	Pop.	Note	%±
1960	620		—
1970	948		52.9%
1980	828		−12.7%
1990	869		5.0%
2000	730		−16.0%
2010	686		−6.0%
2020	623		−9.2%
U.S. Decennial Census

=== 2020 census ===
As of the 2020 census, Savanna had a population of 623. The median age was 43.8 years. 19.6% of residents were under the age of 18 and 17.7% of residents were 65 years of age or older. For every 100 females there were 95.9 males, and for every 100 females age 18 and over there were 98.0 males age 18 and over.

0.0% of residents lived in urban areas, while 100.0% lived in rural areas.

There were 257 households in Savanna, of which 28.8% had children under the age of 18 living in them. Of all households, 42.8% were married-couple households, 24.9% were households with a male householder and no spouse or partner present, and 26.5% were households with a female householder and no spouse or partner present. About 24.5% of all households were made up of individuals and 11.6% had someone living alone who was 65 years of age or older.

There were 310 housing units, of which 17.1% were vacant. The homeowner vacancy rate was 2.2% and the rental vacancy rate was 18.4%.

Racial composition as of the 2020 census
Race	Number	Percent
White	412	66.1%
Black or African American	3	0.5%
American Indian and Alaska Native	107	17.2%
Asian	6	1.0%
Native Hawaiian and Other Pacific Islander	0	0.0%
Some other race	0	0.0%
Two or more races	95	15.2%
Hispanic or Latino (of any race)	15	2.4%

=== 2000 census ===
As of the census of 2000, there were 730 people, 294 households, and 211 families residing in the town. The population density was 521.1 inhabitants per square mile (201.2/km^{2}). There were 354 housing units at an average density of 252.7 per square mile (97.6/km^{2}). The racial makeup of the town was 82.19% White, 0.68% African American, 11.64% Native American, 0.41% Asian, 0.41% from other races, and 4.66% from two or more races. Hispanic or Latino of any race were 1.37% of the population.

There were 294 households, out of which 32.3% had children under the age of 18 living with them, 54.8% were married couples living together, 12.6% had a female householder with no husband present, and 28.2% were non-families. 25.9% of all households were made up of individuals, and 11.9% had someone living alone who was 65 years of age or older. The average household size was 2.48 and the average family size was 2.94.

In the town, the population was spread out, with 24.5% under the age of 18, 7.7% from 18 to 24, 27.9% from 25 to 44, 24.9% from 45 to 64, and 14.9% who were 65 years of age or older. The median age was 39 years. For every 100 females, there were 100.5 males. For every 100 females age 18 and over, there were 96.1 males.

The median income for a household in the town was $28,015, and the median income for a family was $35,139. Males had a median income of $25,568 versus $21,042 for females. The per capita income for the town was $13,575. About 14.1% of families and 14.9% of the population were below the poverty line, including 14.9% of those under age 18 and 13.5% of those age 65 or over.

== Education ==
Savanna operates a fully equipped pre-K - 12 public school system, which had an enrollment of 513 in 2000.
