= Oklahoma State Highway 113 =

State highway in Oklahoma, United States

State Highway 113

Route information
- Maintained by ODOT
- Length: 21.87 mi (35.20 km)

Major junctions
- South end: US 69 Bus. north of McAlester
- North end: US 69 in Canadian

Location
- Country: United States
- State: Oklahoma

Highway system
- Oklahoma State Highway System; Interstate; US; State; Turnpikes
| ← SH-112 | → SH-115 |

State Highway 113 (abbreviated SH-113) is a state highway in Pittsburg County, Oklahoma, United States. It runs for 21.87 miles (35.20 km) and has no lettered spur routes.

== Route description ==
SH-113 begins at Business US-69 north of McAlester. It heads northbound to Indianola, where it turns east and heads to Canadian. It then ends at an interchange with the US-69 freeway.

== Junction list ==
The entire route is in Pittsburg County.

| Location | mi | km | Destinations | Notes |
|---|---|---|---|---|
| | 0.00 | 0.00 | US 69 Bus. | Southern terminus |
| Canadian | 21.87 | 35.20 | US 69 | Interchange, northern terminus |
1.000 mi = 1.609 km; 1.000 km = 0.621 mi
