= Big Cedar, Oklahoma =

Unincorporated Community in Oklahoma, United States

Coordinates: 34°38′45″N 94°38′56″W

Location of Big Cedar within the state of Oklahoma.

Big Cedar is an unincorporated community in Le Flore County, Oklahoma, United States.

== History ==
A post office opened at Bigcedar, Indian Territory on April 3, 1903. On December 1, 1929, the official spelling of the post office name was changed to Big Cedar. The post office was discontinued on October 15, 1943.

At the time of its founding, Big Cedar was located in Wade County, a part of the Apukshunnubbee District of the Choctaw Nation.

Big Cedar is at the intersection of U.S. Route 259 and State Highway 63. President John F. Kennedy visited Big Cedar on October 29, 1961, to dedicate the opening of US-259, then called the Ouachita National Forest Road. A copy of his remarks, along with other materials pertaining to this visit, are available for viewing at the John F. Kennedy Presidential Library and Museum. A John F. Kennedy Memorial, dedicated in 1966, is at the intersection of US-259 with SH-63 in Big Cedar.

Intercity bus service is available from Jefferson Lines in Mena, Arkansas, about 26 miles east.

Big Cedar is on the Ouachita National Recreation Trail, sometimes simply called the Ouachita Trail. The Big Cedar Trailhead is at mile 30.5 of Segment 02 of the Trail.
