= Oklahoma State Highway 43 =

State highway in Oklahoma, United States

State Highway 43

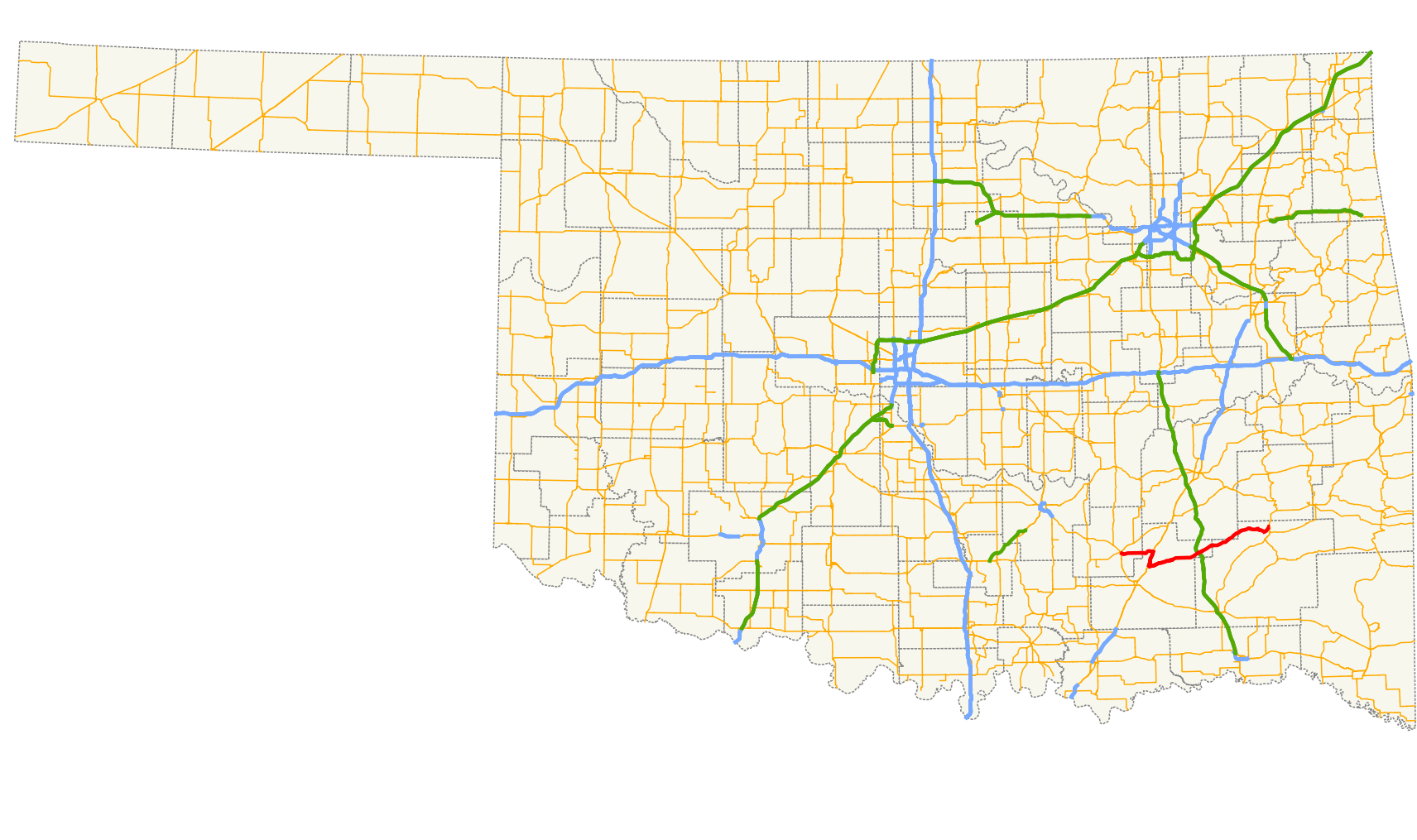

Route information
- Maintained by ODOT
- Length: 65.6 mi (105.6 km)

Major junctions
- West end: US 75 / SH-3 in Coalgate
- US 69 from Flora to Stringtown; Indian Nation Turnpike in Daisy
- East end: SH-2 north of Clayton

Location
- Country: United States
- State: Oklahoma

Highway system
- Oklahoma State Highway System; Interstate; US; State; Turnpikes
← SH-42	→ I-44

State Highway 43 (SH-43 or OK-43) is a state highway in Oklahoma, United States. It runs 65.3 miles west-to-east through Coal, Atoka, Pushmataha and Pittsburg counties.

== Route description ==
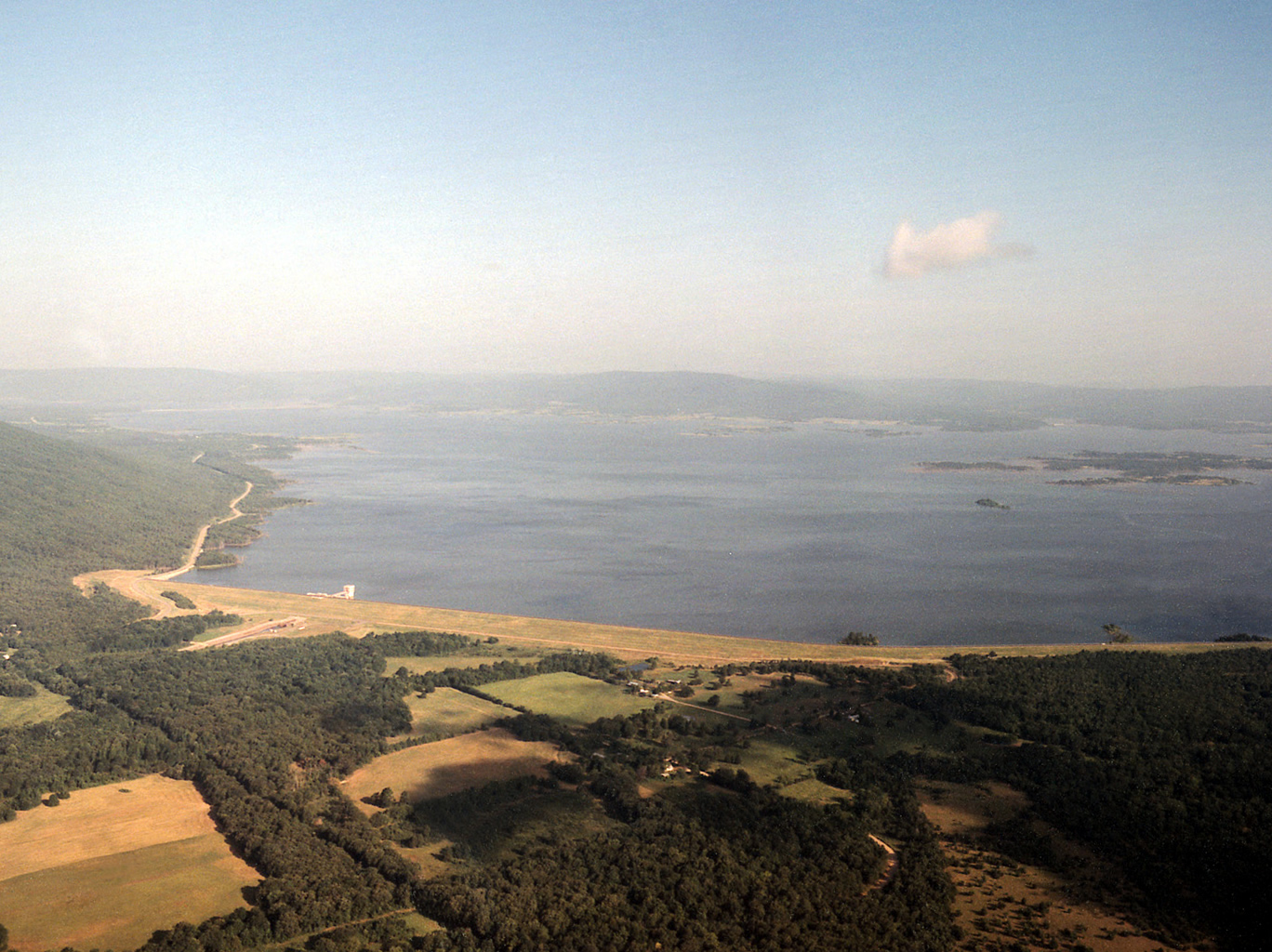
SH-43 runs along the shore of Sardis Lake and crosses its dam.

SH-43 begins at US-75/SH-3 in Coalgate, the seat of Coal County. It runs east from Coalgate for 11 miles (18 km) toward US-69. Before meeting US-69, it crosses into Atoka County and over Atoka Reservoir. Two boat ramps on the reservoir are accessible from SH-43. After crossing the reservoir, SH-43 reaches US-69, which it begins a concurrency with.

US-69 and SH-43 head south, passing through Flora, an unincorporated place, and in between Atoka Reservoir and Sub-Penitentiary Lake. The two highways pass to the west of Grants Gap before reaching Stringtown. There, SH-43 splits off to the east, leaving US-69 five miles (8 km) south of where the two highways first joined.

At Stringtown, SH-43 turns back to the east, paralleling Chickasaw Creek south of Grants Gap. The highway runs along the southern edge of the Atoka Wildlife Management Area west of unincorporated Redden. SH-43 has an interchange with the Indian Nation Turnpike, 19 miles (31 km) east of Stringtown. The diamond interchange, Exit 38 from the turnpike, carries the destination cities of Stringtown and Daisy. Daisy lies just east of the turnpike on SH-43.

East of Daisy, SH-43 passes just north of unincorporated Goss, then crosses into Pushmataha County. Turkey Mountain is just south of the highway as it enters the county. The route travels through the Jackfork Creek basin, a low area between the Jack Fork Mountains and the Big Caney Mountains. After passing through another unincorporated place, Adel, the highway cuts across the far southeast corner of Pittsburg County.

SH-43 re-enters Pushmataha County southwest of the far south arm of Sardis Lake, a reservoir formed by impounding Jackfork Creek. The highway runs along the south shore of the lake. At the southwest corner of the lake, SH-43 runs across the top of the lake's dam. Northeast of the dam, the highway intersects SH-2. This intersection is the highway's eastern terminus.

== Junction list ==
County	Location	mi	km	Destinations	Notes
Coal	Coalgate	0.0	0.0	US 75 / SH-3	Western terminus
Atoka		11.1	17.9	US 69	Northern end of US-69 concurrency
Atoka	Stringtown	16.2	26.1	US 69	Southern end of US-69 concurrency
Atoka	Daisy	34.2	55.0	Indian Nation Turnpike	INT exit 38; Diamond interchange.
Pushmataha	No major junctions				
Pittsburg	No major junctions				
Pushmataha		65.6	105.6	SH-2	Eastern terminus
1.000 mi = 1.609 km; 1.000 km = 0.621 mi: Concurrency terminus
