= Wainwright, Oklahoma =

- Town
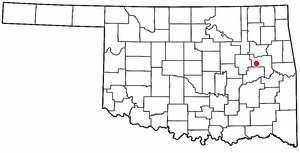
- Location in Oklahoma
- Coordinates: 35°36′49″N 95°33′56″W
- Country: United States
- State: Oklahoma
- County: Muskogee

Area
  - Total: 0.29 sq mi (0.76 km^{2})
  - Land: 0.29 sq mi (0.76 km^{2})
  - Water: 0 sq mi (0.00 km^{2})
- Elevation: 643 ft (196 m)

Population (2020)
  - Total: 93
  - Density: 315/sq mi (121.8/km^{2})
- Time zone: UTC-6 (Central (CST))
  - Summer (DST): UTC-5 (CDT)
- ZIP Code: 74468
- Area codes: 539/918
- FIPS code: 40-77900
- GNIS feature ID: 2413438

Wainwright is a town in Muskogee County, Oklahoma, United States. It was named for a local merchant, William Henry Wainwright. The population was 93 at the 2020 census, down from 165 in 2010.

== Geography ==
Wainwright is in western Muskogee County, 17 miles (27 km) southwest of Muskogee, the county seat, and 12 miles (19 km) north of Checotah. According to the U.S. Census Bureau, the town has a total area of 0.3 square miles (0.78 km^{2}), all land. The town is drained by Anderson Creek, a southeast-flowing tributary of Dirty Creek, which runs east to the Arkansas River southeast of Webbers Falls.

== Demographics ==
Historical population
Census	Pop.	Note	%±
1910	213		—
1920	254		19.2%
1930	162		−36.2%
1940	162		0.0%
1950	138		−14.8%
1960	114		−17.4%
1970	135		18.4%
1980	182		34.8%
1990	223		22.5%
2000	197		−11.7%
2010	165		−16.2%
2020	93		−43.6%
U.S. Decennial Census

=== 2020 census ===
As of the 2020 census, Wainwright had a population of 93. The median age was 48.3 years. 21.5% of residents were under the age of 18 and 26.9% of residents were 65 years of age or older. For every 100 females there were 93.8 males, and for every 100 females age 18 and over there were 97.3 males age 18 and over.

0.0% of residents lived in urban areas, while 100.0% lived in rural areas.

There were 29 households in Wainwright, of which 34.5% had children under the age of 18 living in them. Of all households, 44.8% were married-couple households, 20.7% were households with a male householder and no spouse or partner present, and 27.6% were households with a female householder and no spouse or partner present. About 24.1% of all households were made up of individuals and 10.3% had someone living alone who was 65 years of age or older.

There were 37 housing units, of which 21.6% were vacant. The homeowner vacancy rate was 3.8% and the rental vacancy rate was 0.0%.

Racial composition as of the 2020 census
Race	Number	Percent
White	72	77.4%
Black or African American	0	0.0%
American Indian and Alaska Native	14	15.1%
Asian	0	0.0%
Native Hawaiian and Other Pacific Islander	0	0.0%
Some other race	0	0.0%
Two or more races	7	7.5%
Hispanic or Latino (of any race)	1	1.1%

=== 2000 census ===
As of the census of 2000, there were 197 people, 64 households, and 48 families residing in the town. The population density was 673.2 inhabitants per square mile (259.9/km^{2}). There were 67 housing units at an average density of 229.0 per square mile (88.4/km^{2}). The racial makeup of the town was 77.16% White, 5.08% African American, 15.23% Native American, 2.03% from other races, and 0.51% from two or more races. Hispanic or Latino of any race were 3.05% of the population.

There were 64 households, out of which 35.9% had children under the age of 18 living with them, 62.5% were married couples living together, 6.3% had a female householder with no husband present, and 25.0% were non-families. 20.3% of all households were made up of individuals, and 4.7% had someone living alone who was 65 years of age or older. The average household size was 3.08 and the average family size was 3.54.

In the town, the population was spread out, with 36.0% under the age of 18, 6.6% from 18 to 24, 31.0% from 25 to 44, 18.3% from 45 to 64, and 8.1% who were 65 years of age or older. The median age was 32 years. For every 100 females, there were 105.2 males. For every 100 females age 18 and over, there were 93.8 males.

The median income for a household in the town was $20,833, and the median income for a family was $14,861. Males had a median income of $21,250 versus $17,292 for females. The per capita income for the town was $7,639. About 27.5% of families and 31.4% of the population were below the poverty line, including 42.0% of those under the age of eighteen and none of those 65 or over.
