= Oklahoma State Highway 63 =

State highway in Oklahoma, United States

State Highway 63

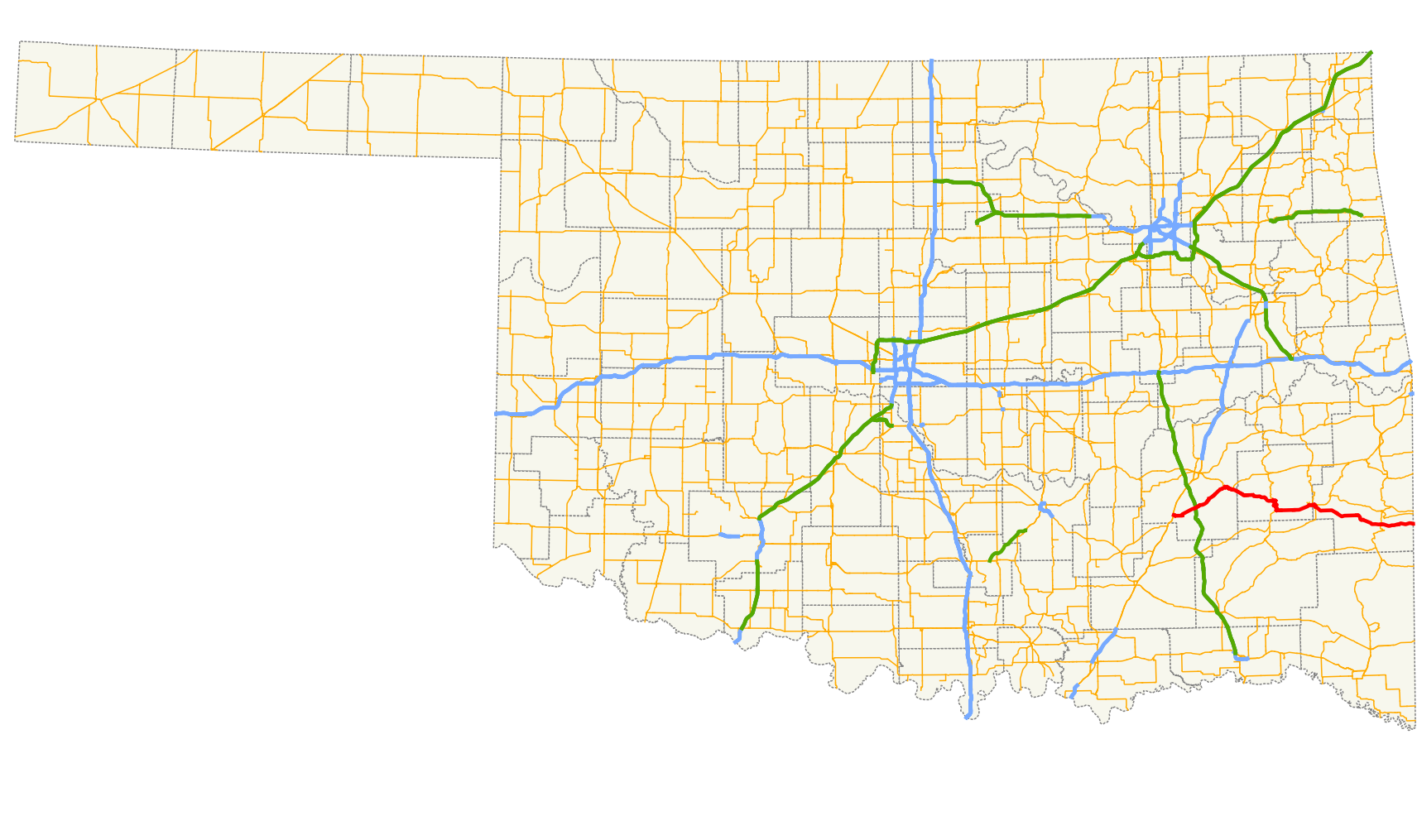

Route information
- Maintained by ODOT
- Length: 96.7 mi (155.6 km)
- Existed: November 6, 1935–present

Major junctions
- West end: US 69 in Kiowa
- US 270 from Haileyville to Heartshorne; SH-1 from Haileyville to Talihina; US 271 in Big Cedar
- East end: AR 8 at the Arkansas state line near Big Cedar

Location
- Country: United States
- State: Oklahoma

Highway system
- Oklahoma State Highway System; Interstate; US; State; Turnpikes
← US 62	→ US 64

State Highway 63 (abbreviated SH-63) is a 96.7 miles (155.6 km) state highway in southeastern Oklahoma. It runs from U.S. Highway 69 in Kiowa to the Arkansas state line. SH-1 forms a concurrency with SH-63 for 37.8 miles (60.8 km), nearly 40 percent of the highway's length. SH-63 has one spur route, designated as SH-63A.

SH-63 was added to the state highway system on November 6, 1935, as a short link highway between Talihina and SH-2. The highway was gradually extended to its present length between then and 1960. When the current incarnation of SH-1 was established, the middle of SH-63 was turned over to the new highway, leaving SH-63 in two separate parts. The two sections were connected via a concurrency in the early 1980s.

== Route description ==
SH-63 heads northeast from Kiowa, passing through Pittsburg and crossing under the Indian Nation Turnpike near Blanco. In Haileyville, it meets US-270/SH-1 and begins a concurrency with them. After passing through Hartshorne, US-270 splits off. Seven miles (11 km) later, the highways pass through unincorporated Higgins, then continues east for 9 miles (14 km), where they meets State Highway 2 and the two highways concur with it.

The SH-1/2/63 concurrency heads south for six miles (9.7 km). West of Buffalo Valley, SH-2 splits off to the south as SH-1/63 head east. In Talihina, the highways meet US-271, which SH-1 joins. SH-63 heads east alone, passing through Whitesboro and Muse. In Big Cedar, it crosses U.S. Highway 259. It then enters Ouachita National Forest and ends at the state line. Arkansas Highway 8 continues on to Mena.

== History ==
State Highway 63 was first established on November 6, 1935, as a connection between SH-2 and US-271 in Talihina. On April 1, 1936, the highway was extended east to end at the Arkansas state line. This remained the highway's extent for the remainder of the 1930s and the 1940s.

The highway was extended west for the first time on August 4, 1952, when SH-63's western terminus was set at US-270 near Hartshorne. The highway was extended further west on January 29, 1960, bringing it to US-69 in Kiowa. The SH-63 of 1960 had the same basic route as that of the present day. Minor realignments to the highway occurred on September 6, 1962, northwest of the northern SH-2 junction, and through Haileyville and Hartshorne on August 3, 1964.

The current State Highway 1 was designated on February 5, 1968. The portion of highway between Haileyville and Talihina was made solely part of SH-1. This left SH-63 in two discontinuous sections, one between Kiowa and Haileyville and one from Talihina to the Arkansas line. This situation would persist for fifteen years. On July 7, 1983, SH-63 was restored between the two segments, forming the SH-1/63 concurrency. No further changes have occurred to the highway since.

== Junction list ==
County	Location	mi	km	Destinations	Notes
Pittsburg	Kiowa	0.0	0.0	US 69	Western terminus
Pittsburg	Haileyville	21.9	35.2	US 270 / SH-1	Western end of US-270/SH-1 concurrency
Pittsburg	Hartshorne	24.6	39.6	US 270	Eastern end of US-270 concurrency
Latimer		39.9	64.2	SH-2	Northern end of SH-2 concurrency
Latimer		46.0	74.0	SH-2	Southern end of SH-2 concurrency
Latimer		57.9	93.2	SH-63A	Southern terminus of SH-63A
Le Flore	Talihina	59.2	95.3	SH-82	Southern terminus of SH-82
Le Flore	Talihina	59.7	96.1	SH-1	Eastern end of SH-1 concurrency
Le Flore	Big Cedar	85.4	137.4	US 271	
Le Flore		96.7	155.6	AR 8	Eastern terminus, Arkansas state line
1.000 mi = 1.609 km; 1.000 km = 0.621 mi: Concurrency terminus

== SH-63A ==
SH-63A shield

SH-63 has one lettered spur, SH-63A. SH-63A begins at SH-1/63 two miles (3 km) west of Talihina. It heads north for 1/4-mile (0.40 km) before forking into two separate highways. The west fork goes to the Choctaw Nation hospital, while the east fork goes to the Oklahoma Veterans Center. The west fork is exactly 1.00 mile (1.61 km) long, and the southern and eastern forks together are 1.40 miles (2.25 km), for a total combined length of 2.40 miles (3.86 km).
