= Krebs, Oklahoma =

- City
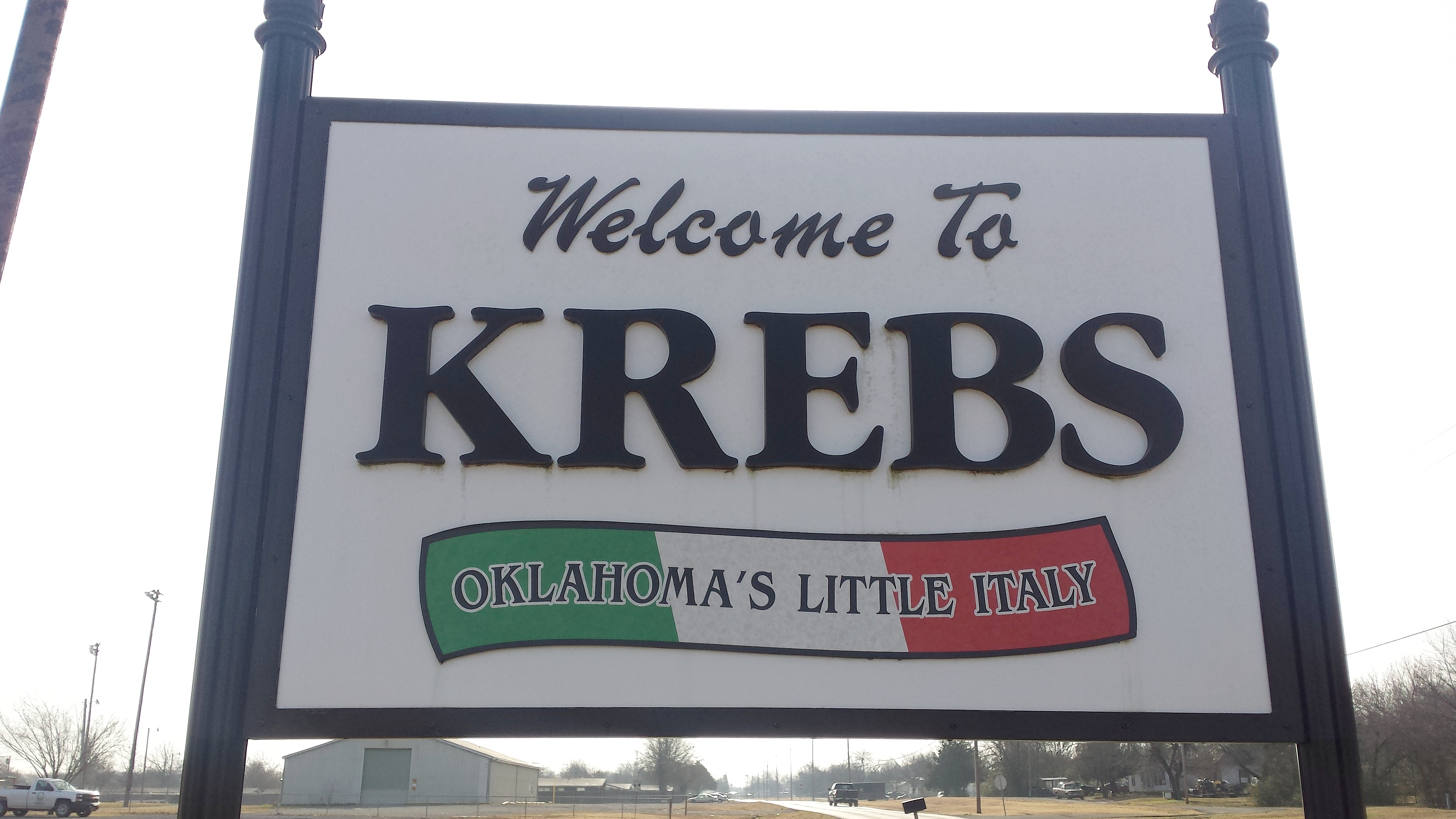
- Welcome sign
- Nickname: Little Italy
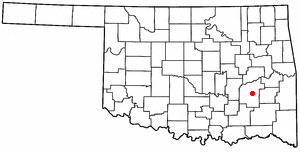
- Location of Krebs, Oklahoma
- Coordinates: 34°55′48″N 95°43′08″W
- Country: United States
- State: Oklahoma
- County: Pittsburg

Government
  - Type: Mayor-council
  - Mayor: Bobby Watkins

Area
  - Total: 4.85 sq mi (12.57 km^{2})
  - Land: 4.85 sq mi (12.55 km^{2})
  - Water: 0.0077 sq mi (0.02 km^{2})
- Elevation: 663 ft (202 m)

Population (2020)
  - Total: 2,083
  - Density: 430/sq mi (166/km^{2})
- Time zone: UTC-6 (Central (CST))
  - Summer (DST): UTC-5 (CDT)
- ZIP code: 74554
- Area codes: 539/918
- FIPS code: 40-40300
- GNIS feature ID: 2411559
- Website: http://cityofkrebs.com/home

Krebs is a city in Pittsburg County, Oklahoma, United States. The population was 2,083 at the time of the 2020 United States census, up 1.5% from the 2,053 reported at the 2010 census, which in turn was a slight increase from the 2,051 reported in 2000. Its nickname is "Little Italy." Krebs was founded before Oklahoma statehood as a coal-mining town in the Choctaw Nation of Indian Territory.

== History ==
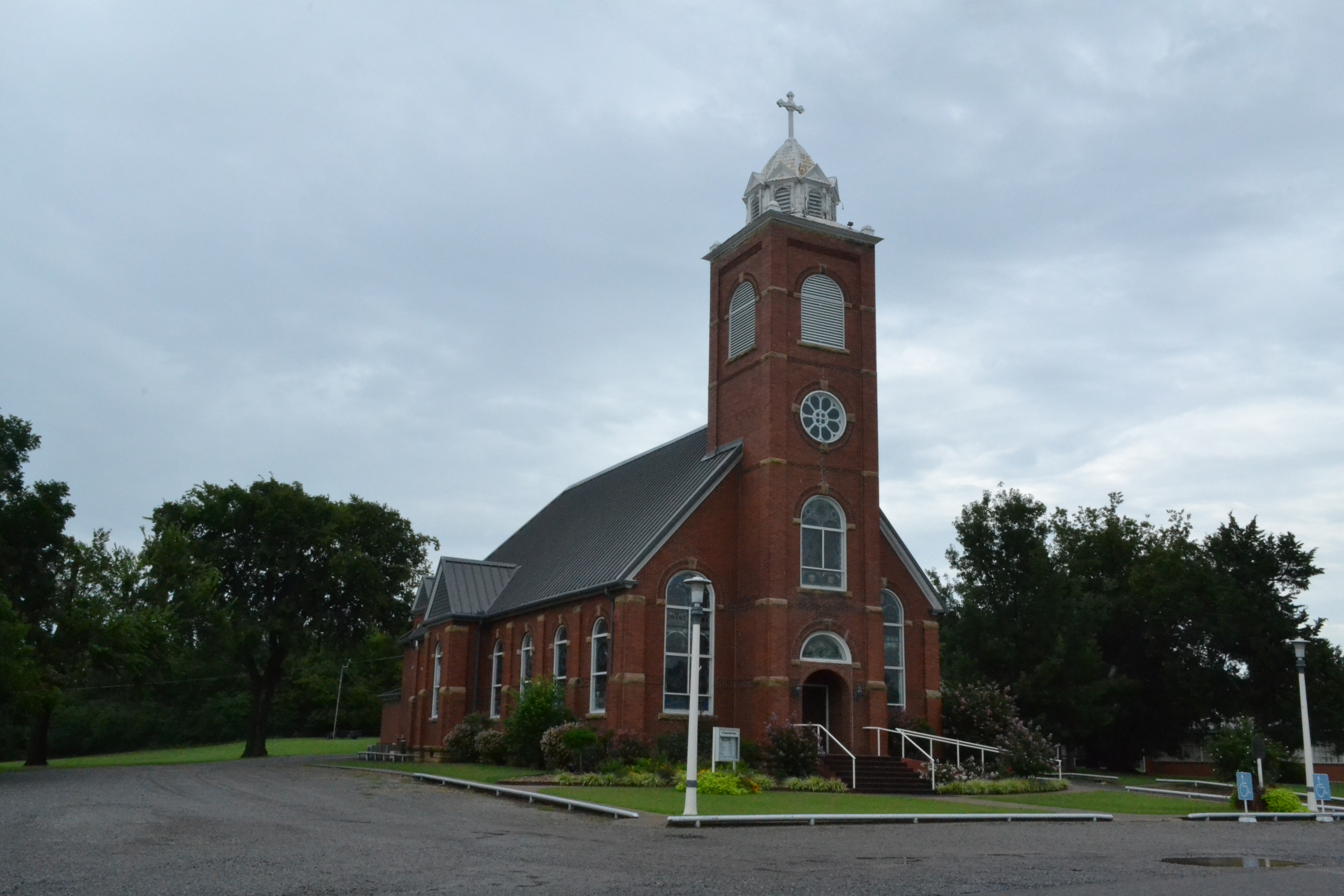
St. Joseph's Catholic Church

A post office was established at Krebs, Indian Territory on February 10, 1886. At the time of its founding, Krebs was located in Tobucksy County, a part of the Moshulatubbee District of the Choctaw Nation. Krebs began as a coal-mining camp housing European immigrants who came to work coal mines in the surrounding area. The town is named after Judge Edmond Folsom Krebs (1821-1893), a county judge in Tobucksy County. Judge Krebs was born of mixed German and Choctaw ancestry in Winston County, Mississippi.

=== 1892 mining explosion ===
An explosion in the Osage Coal & Mining Company’s No. 11 mine on January 7, 1892 killed about 100 workers and injured another 150, but mining continued to prosper. By 1895, there were 15 mines operating nearby. The first local of the United Mine Workers in Indian Territory was founded in the town in 1898.

=== Early Krebs ===
Krebs was incorporated in the Choctaw Nation in 1903, with Mel D. Reed elected as the first mayor and Bob Miller as the first chief of police. The current St. Joseph's Catholic Church was constructed in 1903. It and an opera house were the first two brick buildings in town. An earlier church and the first opera house, both built of wood, had previously burned down.

The Krebs school system was organized in 1907, the same year that the Choctaw Nation and Indian Territory governments were replaced by the new State of Oklahoma.

The Missouri–Kansas–Texas Railroad (also known as the MKT or "Katy") built a branch from McAlester to Wilburton, on which it ran a two-coach train known affectionately as "Nellie." The Katy station was in downtown Krebs. Later, another station was built south of town on the East-West line to serve the Chicago, Rock Island & Pacific Railroad (a.k.a. CRI&P or Rock Island.) Krebs was also linked to McAlester, Alderson, Bache, Haileyville, and Hartshorne by the Pittsburg County Railway interurban from 1903 to 1946.

Krebs had five newspapers at different times: Krebs Eagle, Krebs Cyclone, Krebs Banner, Krebs Advertiser, and The Oklahoma Miner.

== Geography ==
According to the United States Census Bureau, the city has a total area of 3.4 square miles (8.8 km^{2}), of which 3.4 sq mi (8.8 km^{2}) is land and 0.29% is water.

Krebs is 3 miles (4.8 km) east of McAlester, the county seat, on U.S. Route 270 and State Highway 31.

== Notable places ==
The Krebs Opera House was re-built as a brick structure in 1903, after the first one had been destroyed by fire the previous year. It and the St. Joseph's Catholic Church were the first brick buildings to go up in Krebs. It was the only place for miles around that featured stage shows. Many fine road shows played here, and moving pictures were shown in the Opera House, also. The Dreamland Theater, owned and operated by Mr. & Mrs. David Holstead, later became the popular movie theater in Krebs. The original wooden St. Joseph's Church also burned in 1902. That structure was replaced by the current brick St. Joseph’s Catholic Church in 1903; that facility has been completely refurbished in recent years, and is listed on the National Register of Historic Places listings in Pittsburg County, Oklahoma, as is Hokey’s Drugstore at 2 E. Washington Ave.

Also taking place in town was the Terrapin Derby, originated in 1929 when Mayor J.T. Sadler visited the Miller Brothers Shows in Ponca City, Oklahoma. Mayor Sadler brought the idea back to Krebs as a fundraising idea. The derby was a success, and enough money was raised to purchase a new truck for the city. Over the years the derby raised funds that provided vehicles and equipment for one of the finest volunteer fire departments in the region.

Krebs had an Italian Band that played in a double-decker bandstand in downtown Krebs. There were at least five bandstands between McAlester and Hartshorne that the band played at on weekends, providing entertainment for families from all over. Many families rode the street car to these sites for picnics and festivals.

The city of Krebs maintains a city park which includes a baseball park, a one-kilometer (0.6-mile) walking track, picnic facilities, a two-story replica of the gazebo that had stood in the town square, and will include playground equipment. The park stands on a portion of the old fairground/racetrack site of a hundred years ago. The original racetrack was a 1/8-mile (0.20 km), banked oval track where horses, sulkys, and early autos were raced. The Krebs Italian Band played many festivals or 'festas' at the park in bygone simpler times. For years during the 1990s, "The Ethnic Festival" was a popular attraction on Labor Day weekend, taking place on this Historical Site. Games such as bocce ball and morra were played by all for fun.

== Demographics ==
Historical population
Census	Pop.	Note	%±
1910	2,884		—
1920	2,078		−27.9%
1930	1,375		−33.8%
1940	1,436		4.4%
1950	1,532		6.7%
1960	1,342		−12.4%
1970	1,515		12.9%
1980	1,754		15.8%
1990	1,955		11.5%
2000	2,051		4.9%
2010	2,053		0.1%
2020	2,083		1.5%
U.S. Decennial Census

=== 2020 census ===
As of the 2020 census, Krebs had a population of 2,083. The median age was 36.8 years. 23.4% of residents were under the age of 18 and 17.9% of residents were 65 years of age or older. For every 100 females there were 100.3 males, and for every 100 females age 18 and over there were 98.1 males age 18 and over.

92.9% of residents lived in urban areas, while 7.1% lived in rural areas.

There were 837 households in Krebs, of which 30.6% had children under the age of 18 living in them. Of all households, 43.1% were married-couple households, 21.4% were households with a male householder and no spouse or partner present, and 27.0% were households with a female householder and no spouse or partner present. About 27.0% of all households were made up of individuals and 11.3% had someone living alone who was 65 years of age or older.

There were 998 housing units, of which 16.1% were vacant. Among occupied housing units, 64.5% were owner-occupied and 35.5% were renter-occupied. The homeowner vacancy rate was 3.4% and the rental vacancy rate was 16.9%.

Racial composition as of the 2020 census
Race	Percent
White	65.6%
Black or African American	2.0%
American Indian and Alaska Native	15.4%
Asian	0.6%
Native Hawaiian and Other Pacific Islander	0%
Some other race	2.2%
Two or more races	14.3%
Hispanic or Latino (of any race)	7.2%

=== 2000 census ===
As of the census of 2000, there were 2,051 people, 858 households, and 560 families residing in the city. The population density was 601.6 inhabitants per square mile (232.3/km^{2}). There were 949 housing units at an average density of 278.4/sq mi (107.5/km^{2}). The racial makeup of the city was 78.40% White, 1.17% African-American, 13.60% Native American, 0.44% Asian, 0.49% from other races, and 5.90% from two or more races. Hispanic or Latino of any race were 1.66% of the population.

There were 858 households, out of which 33.9% had children under the age of 18 living with them, 47.3% were married couples living together, 15.3% had a female householder with no husband present, and 34.7% were non-families. 31.5% of all households were made up of individuals, and 14.1% had someone living alone who was 65 years of age or older. The average household size was 2.39, and the average family size was 3.00.

In the city, the population was spread out, with 27.3% under the age of 18, 9.7% from 18 to 24, 28.6% from 25 to 44, 21.6% from 45 to 64, and 12.8% who were 65 years of age or older. The median age was 34 years. For every 100 females, there were 91.0 males. For every 100 females age 18 and over, there were 86.8 males.

The median income for a household in the city was $24,514, and the median income for a family was $31,641. Males had a median income of $27,321 versus $17,235 for females. The per capita income for the city was $13,042. About 16.6% of families and 19.1% of the population were below the poverty line, including 25.2% of those under age 18 and 10.7% of those age 65 or over.

== Government ==
Krebs has an aldermanic form of government. The current mayor is Tommy Ray Walker. The city has four council persons.

Krebs has a police force of nine officers.

== See also ==
St. Joseph's Catholic Church
