= Carlton Landing, Oklahoma =

- Town
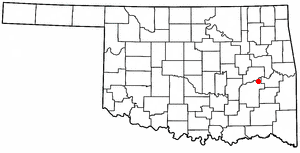
- Location of Carlton Landing, Oklahoma
- Coordinates: 35°12′46″N 95°33′28″W
- Country: United States
- State: Oklahoma
- County: Pittsburg
- Incorporated: October 21, 2013
- Founder: Grant Humphreys

Area
  - Total: 0.097 sq mi (0.25 km^{2})
  - Land: 0.097 sq mi (0.25 km^{2})
  - Water: 0 sq mi (0.00 km^{2})
- Elevation: 791 ft (241 m)

Population (2020)
  - Total: 94
  - Density: 959.2/sq mi (370.34/km^{2})
- Time zone: UTC-6 (Central (CST))
  - Summer (DST): UTC-5 (CDT)
- ZIP codes: 74432
- Area codes: 539/918
- FIPS code: 40-11990
- GNIS feature ID: 2747316
- Website: carltonlanding.com

Carlton Landing is a master-planned resort town in Pittsburg County, Oklahoma, United States, conceived and built by real estate developer Grant Humphreys. It was established on October 21, 2013, and had a population of 94 as of 2020.

== Geography ==
Carlton Landing is built along the shore of Lake Eufaula, a reservoir located on the Canadian River.

According to the United States Census Bureau, the town has a total area of 0.098 square miles (0.25 km^{2}), all land.

== History ==
Carlton Landing was conceived by Grant Humphreys, real estate developer and son of former Oklahoma City Mayor Kirk Humphreys. He was inspired by visits to Seaside, Florida, one of the first communities designed according to the tenets of New Urbanism. Humphreys, whose family had vacationed at a lake house on Lake Eufaula, Oklahoma since 1971, thought the area would be the ideal site for a similar community. His real estate company, The Humphreys Company, began to purchase land adjacent to the lake in 2007 and within 12 months had acquired approximately 1,600 acres (650 ha). Over the next two years Humphreys, through his real estate company, contracted with various urban planners, architects, and engineers to design what would become a pedestrian-centric neighborhood with lots for 2,000 homes. The final design was laid out by Miami-based architect Andres Duany. It included walking paths, shared public areas, homes with large front porches, a 200-acre (81 ha) preserve with walking trails, and a 600-acre (240 ha) area reserved for organic farming.

Site and infrastructure work began in 2010 and residential construction started in 2011. The first residents were Grant and Jen Humphreys and their family, who moved into Carlton Landing in 2012. By November 2019 the community had 200 homes, a charter school and an organic farm.

In June 2019, the town water district was fined $100,000 by the Oklahoma Department of Environmental Quality for repeatedly discharging wastewater without first obtaining approvals from the DEQ. The water district discharged millions of gallons of partially treated wastewater into Lake Eufaula between March 2018 and June 2019. Humphreys promised that the town would build a water treatment plant capable of handling 80,000 to 160,000 US gallons (300,000 to 610,000 L; 67,000 to 133,000 imp gal) a day, versus the current 18,000 US gallons (68,000 L; 15,000 imp gal) per day capacity.

== Demographics ==
Historical population
Census	Pop.	Note	%±
2020	94		—
U.S. Decennial Census

=== 2020 census ===
As of the 2020 census, Carlton Landing had a population of 94. The median age was 36.5 years. 36.2% of residents were under the age of 18 and 12.8% of residents were 65 years of age or older. For every 100 females there were 95.8 males, and for every 100 females age 18 and over there were 87.5 males age 18 and over.

0.0% of residents lived in urban areas, while 100.0% lived in rural areas.

There were 32 households in Carlton Landing, of which 68.8% had children under the age of 18 living in them. Of all households, 50.0% were married-couple households, 12.5% were households with a male householder and no spouse or partner present, and 31.3% were households with a female householder and no spouse or partner present. About 15.7% of all households were made up of individuals and 3.1% had someone living alone who was 65 years of age or older.

There were 239 housing units, of which 86.6% were vacant. The homeowner vacancy rate was 10.3% and the rental vacancy rate was 40.0%.

Racial composition as of the 2020 census
Race	Number	Percent
White	84	89.4%
Black or African American	0	0.0%
American Indian and Alaska Native	2	2.1%
Asian	0	0.0%
Native Hawaiian and Other Pacific Islander	0	0.0%
Some other race	0	0.0%
Two or more races	8	8.5%
Hispanic or Latino (of any race)	2	2.1%
