= Area codes 918 and 539 =

Telephone area codes in Oklahoma, US

Coordinates: 35.5°N 95.5°W

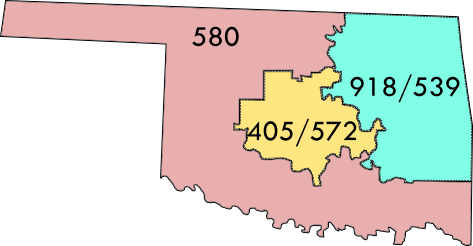

Area codes 918 and 539 are telephone overlay area codes in the North American Numbering Plan for the northeast of Oklahoma, including the city of Tulsa. The numbering plan area also comprises Bartlesville, Broken Arrow, Claremore, Gore, Jenks, McAlester, Muskogee, Okmulgee, Pryor, Sapulpa, Tahlequah.

Area code 918 was created in 1953 in an area code split of 405. Area code 539 was added to the numbering plan area on April 1, 2011. Mandatory ten-digit dialing became effective on March 5, 2011. It is the first overlay in Oklahoma.

== Service area ==
Below is a full list of all towns and cities in the numbering plan area.

- Adair
- Afton
- Agra
- Albion
- Alderson
- Arkoma
- Avant
- Barnsdall
- Bartlesville
- Bearden
- Beggs
- Big Cabin
- Bixby
- Boatman
- Bokoshe
- Boley
- Boynton
- Braggs
- Bristow
- Broken Arrow
- Bugtussle
- Burbank
- Bushyhead
- Cameron
- Canadian
- Cardin
- Carlton Landing
- Carter Nine
- Castle
- Catoosa
- Checotah
- Chelsea
- Chouteau
- Claremore
- Clayton
- Cleveland
- Colcord
- Collinsville
- Commerce
- Copan
- Council Hill
- Coweta
- Crowder
- Cushing
- Davenport
- Delaware
- Depew
- Dewar
- Dewey
- Disney
- Drumright
- Dustin
- Eufaula
- Fairfax
- Fairland
- Fanshawe
- Foraker
- Fort Gibson
- Foyil
- Gans
- Glenpool
- Gore
- Grayson
- Grove
- Haileyville
- Hallett
- Hanna
- Hartshorne
- Haskell
- Heavener
- Henryetta
- Hitchita
- Hoffman
- Hominy
- Howe
- Hulbert
- Indianola
- Inola
- Jay
- Jenks
- Jennings
- Kansas
- Kellyville
- Kendrick
- Kenwood
- Keota
- Kiefer
- Kinta
- Kiowa
- Krebs
- Langley
- Le Flore
- Lenapah
- Lequire
- Locust Grove
- Mannford
- Marmec
- Marble City
- Mazie
- McAlester
- McCurtain
- Miami
- Moffett
- Morris
- Mounds
- Muldrow
- Muse
- Muskogee
- New Tulsa
- North Miami
- Nowata
- Oakhurst
- Oaks
- Ochelata
- Oilton
- Okay
- Okemah
- Okmulgee
- Oktaha
- Oologah
- Osage
- Owasso
- Page
- Panama
- Park Hill
- Parkland
- Pawhuska
- Pawnee
- Peoria
- Pettit
- Picher
- Pittsburg
- Pocola
- Porter
- Porum
- Poteau
- Prue
- Pryor
- Quapaw
- Quinton
- Ralston
- Ramona
- Red Oak
- Redbird
- Rentiesville
- Ripley
- Roland
- Salina
- Sallisaw
- Sand Springs
- Sapulpa
- Savanna
- Schulter
- Shady Point
- Shamrock
- Shidler
- Skiatook
- Slick
- South Coffeyville
- Sparks
- Spavinaw
- Sperry
- Spiro
- Stidham
- Stigler
- Stilwell
- Strang
- Stroud
- Stuart
- Taft
- Tahlequah
- Talala
- Tamaha
- Terlton
- Texanna
- Ti
- Tryon
- Tullahassee
- Tulsa
- Turley
- Tussy
- Twin Oaks
- Vera
- Verdigris
- Vian
- Vinita
- Wagoner
- Wainwright
- Wann
- Warner
- Watts
- Webbers Falls
- Welch
- Welling
- Westport
- Westville
- Whitefield
- Wilburton
- Wister
- Wyandotte
- Wynona
- Yale

Oklahoma area codes: 405/572, 580, 918/539
	North: 620	
West: 580, 405/572	539/918	East: 417, 479, 870
	South: 580	
Kansas area codes: 316, 620, 785, 913
Missouri area codes: 314/557, 417, 573/235, 636, 660, 816/975
Arkansas area codes: 479, 501, 870/327
