= St. Joseph's Catholic Church (Krebs, Oklahoma) =

Historic church in Oklahoma, United States

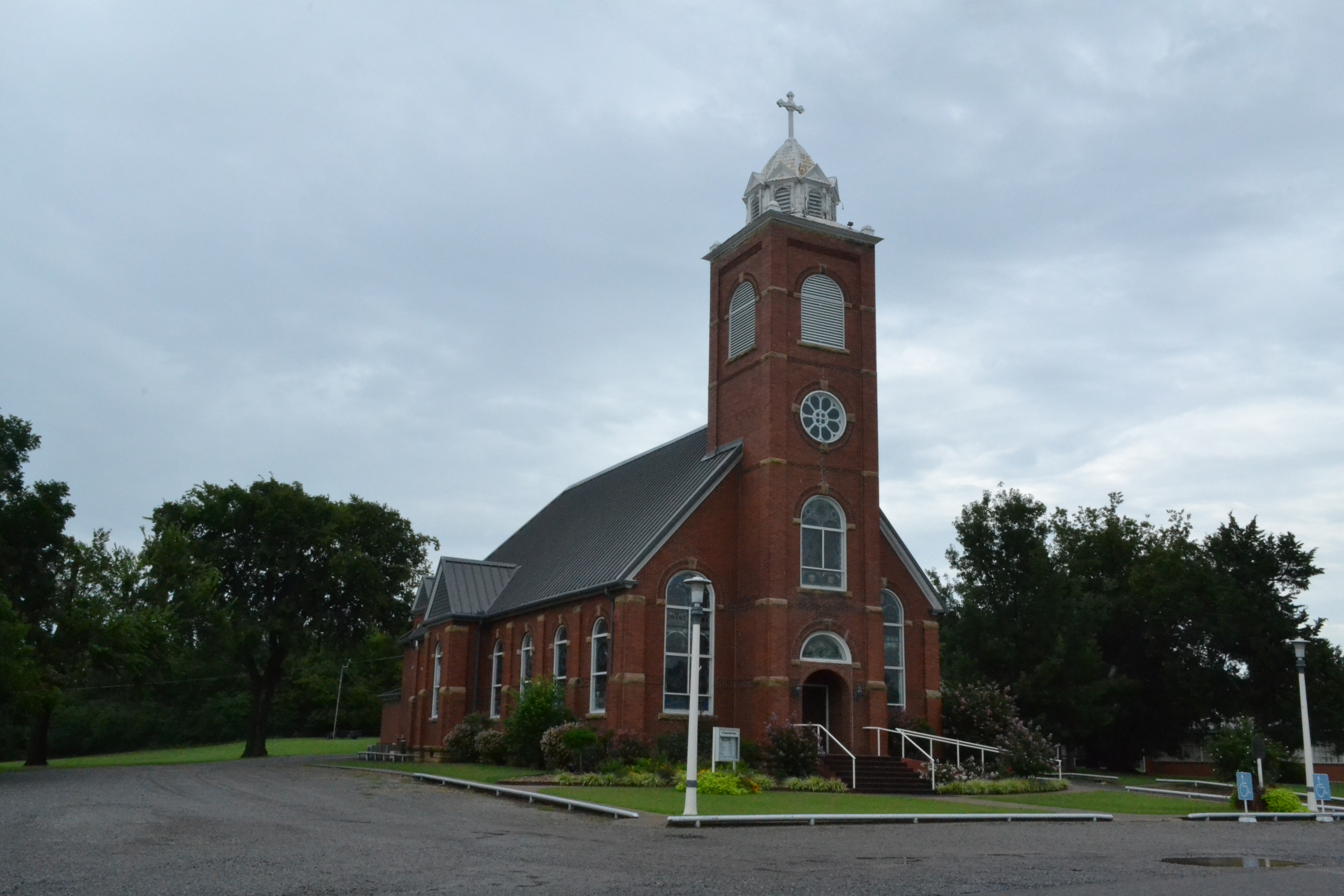
- St. Joseph's Catholic Church
- 34.9326°N 95.7184°W
- Location: 290 NW Church Street, Krebs, Oklahoma
- Country: United States
- Denomination: Roman Catholic
- Website: stjoseph-krebs.org

History
- Status: Active
- Founded: 1886
- Founder: Dom Isidore Robot

Architecture
- Architectural type: Eclectic
- Years built: 1903–1907

Administration
- Diocese: Tulsa
- Parish: St. Joseph's

Clergy
- Pastor: Father Kingsley George-Obilonu
- St. Joseph's Catholic Church
- U.S. National Register of Historic Places
- Location within Oklahoma Location within the United States
- Area: less than one acre
- NRHP reference No.: 80003296
- Added to NRHP: November 12, 1980

St. Joseph's Catholic Church is a historic Roman Catholic church building located at 290 NW Church Street in Krebs, Oklahoma, United States. The first church building was constructed of wood in 1886. It burned down in 1902, and a new brick structure was built in 1903 and added to the National Register of Historic Places (NRHP) in 1980.

== History ==
This church traces its history to 1885, when two Benedictine priests, Father (Fr.) Isidore Robot and Brother Dominic Lambert, (Note: Robot's official title at the time was Prefect Apostolic of Indian Territory.) arrived in the area and built a small house and chapel where St. Joseph's Cemetery is now. At the time, the area was part of Tobucksy County, Choctaw Nation. The site was a private home owned by Louis Roth. After the mass, a building committee was formed to develop plans to build a church and school. A wood-frame church and a two-room school building were completed in 1886. This was the first parochial school in what is now Oklahoma and was operated by Sisters of Mercy. Fr. Robot died February 15, 1887. Fr. Bernard Murphy was appointed as the first pastor.

The church and rectory were destroyed by fire on December 13, 1902. Construction of the church now in use began in 1903, and was completed in 1907. The new rectory was finished in 1906. The only part of the original church that could be salvaged was the bell, which has been reinstalled in the campanile of the new structure. The interior of the church was extensively remodeled in 1965 to accommodate the liturgical changes caused by Vatican II. A new chapel was added to the church in 1978.

== Physical appearance ==
The NRHP application for the current (1903) church described the building's architecture as eclectic. The exterior is constructed of red brick. A campanile (tower) sits above the entrance, and contains the original church bell. The exterior has several Romanesque elements: the campanile, the arcaded opening, the small wheel window and the other arched windows around the facade. Subsequent renovations have not altered the exterior appearance.

The interior, on the other hand, was substantially changed during the 1966 renovation. The principal changes were:

- The appearance of the altar was subdued;
- Paintings were removed and stored;
- Walls were covered with ivory paint;
- Ceiling was painted white.
