= Kiowa, Oklahoma =

- Town
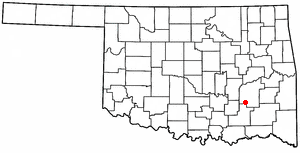
- Location of Kiowa, Oklahoma
- Coordinates: 34°43′22″N 95°54′09″W
- Country: United States
- State: Oklahoma
- County: Pittsburg

Area
  - Total: 1.25 sq mi (3.24 km^{2})
  - Land: 1.24 sq mi (3.22 km^{2})
  - Water: 0.0077 sq mi (0.02 km^{2})
- Elevation: 738 ft (225 m)

Population (2020)
  - Total: 595
  - Density: 478.9/sq mi (184.89/km^{2})
- Time zone: UTC-6 (Central (CST))
  - Summer (DST): UTC-5 (CDT)
- ZIP code: 74553
- Area codes: 539/918
- FIPS code: 40-40000
- GNIS feature ID: 2412839
- Website: www.kiowaoklahoma.com

Kiowa is a town in Pittsburg County, Oklahoma, United States. As of the 2020 census, the community had 595 residents.

== History ==
At the time of its founding, Kiowa was located in Jacksfork County, Choctaw Nation, in the Indian Territory. Its location is placed by some maps as in Tobucksy County, which included McAlester; the boundary was very near.

A post office was established at Kiowa, Indian Territory on May 6, 1881. It took its name from nearby Kiowa Hill.

== Geography ==
According to the United States Census Bureau, the town has a total area of 1.3 square miles (3.4 km^{2}), all land.

== Demographics ==
Historical population
Census	Pop.	Note	%±
1910	1,021		—
1920	1,287		26.1%
1930	689		−46.5%
1940	802		16.4%
1950	802		0.0%
1960	607		−24.3%
1970	754		24.2%
1980	866		14.9%
1990	718		−17.1%
2000	693		−3.5%
2010	731		5.5%
2020	595		−18.6%
U.S. Decennial Census

=== 2020 census ===
As of the 2020 census, Kiowa had a population of 595. The median age was 41.0 years. 25.5% of residents were under the age of 18 and 23.4% of residents were 65 years of age or older. For every 100 females there were 101.0 males, and for every 100 females age 18 and over there were 98.7 males age 18 and over.

0.0% of residents lived in urban areas, while 100.0% lived in rural areas.

There were 238 households in Kiowa, of which 33.2% had children under the age of 18 living in them. Of all households, 43.3% were married-couple households, 26.5% were households with a male householder and no spouse or partner present, and 24.4% were households with a female householder and no spouse or partner present. About 29.8% of all households were made up of individuals and 15.1% had someone living alone who was 65 years of age or older.

There were 306 housing units, of which 22.2% were vacant. The homeowner vacancy rate was 1.7% and the rental vacancy rate was 18.2%.

Racial composition as of the 2020 census
Race	Number	Percent
White	379	63.7%
Black or African American	4	0.7%
American Indian and Alaska Native	123	20.7%
Asian	0	0.0%
Native Hawaiian and Other Pacific Islander	0	0.0%
Some other race	3	0.5%
Two or more races	86	14.5%
Hispanic or Latino (of any race)	16	2.7%

=== 2000 census ===
As of the 2000 census, there were 693 people, 293 households, and 200 families residing in the town. The population density was 538.3 inhabitants per square mile (207.8/km^{2}). There were 335 housing units at an average density of 260.2 per square mile (100.5/km^{2}). The racial makeup of the town was 75.1% White, 14.2% Native American, and 6.8% from two or more races, 0.3% African American. Hispanic or Latino of any race were 3.6% of the population.

There were 293 households, out of which 28.7% had children under the age of 18 living with them, 56.0% were married couples living together, 8.2% had a female householder with no husband present, and 31.4% were non-families. 28.7% of all households were made up of individuals, and 15.4% had someone living alone who was 65 years of age or older. The average household size was 2.37 and the average family size was 2.92.

In the town, the population was spread out, with 25.0% under the age of 18, 6.8% from 18 to 24, 26.6% from 25 to 44, 23.4% from 45 to 64, and 18.3% who were 65 years of age or older. The median age was 38 years. For every 100 females, there were 90.4 males. For every 100 females age 18 and over, there were 93.3 males.

The median income for a household in the town was $22,614, and the median income for a family was $33,125. Males had a median income of $22,188 versus $20,000 for females. The per capita income for the town was $17,948. About 16.6% of families and 20.1% of the population were below the poverty line, including 22.2% of those under age 18 and 20.0% of those age 65 or over.

== Notable people ==
- Clonie Gowen, poker player
- Reba McEntire, singer/actress
- Rip Radcliff, baseball player
