= Daisy, Oklahoma =

Unincorporated community in Oklahoma, US

Daisy
- Unincorporated community
- Location within the state of Oklahoma Daisy (the United States)
- Coordinates: 34°32′09″N 95°44′23″W
- Country: United States
- State: Oklahoma
- County: Atoka
- Elevation: 735 ft (224 m)
- Time zone: UTC-6 (Central (CST))
  - Summer (DST): UTC-5 (CDT)
- ZIP code: 74540
- GNIS feature ID: 1100339

Daisy is a small unincorporated community in Atoka County, Oklahoma, United States, along State Highway 43.

== History ==
The community was founded as Many Springs, which served as county seat of Jacksfork County, Choctaw Nation. A post office was established here as Etna, Indian Territory, on August 7, 1884. It was named for Etna Hewitt, a local resident.

The post office closed on August 9, 1897. On April 5, 1906 another post office opened at this location and was known as Daisy, Indian Territory. It was named for Daisy Beck, a local girl.

The most famous person from Daisy is Clarence Carnes, who at 18 was the youngest inmate ever sent to Alcatraz. He is buried on the Indian land not far from Daisy.

== Utilities ==
Telephone and Internet is provided by Hilliary Communications.
