= Indianola, Pittsburg County, Oklahoma =

Indianola, Oklahoma
- Town
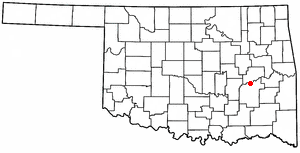
- Location of Indianola, Oklahoma
- Coordinates: 35°09′48″N 95°46′33″W
- Country: United States
- State: Oklahoma
- County: Pittsburg

Area
  - Total: 0.32 sq mi (0.83 km^{2})
  - Land: 0.32 sq mi (0.83 km^{2})
  - Water: 0 sq mi (0.00 km^{2})
- Elevation: 663 ft (202 m)

Population (2020)
  - Total: 148
  - Density: 463.4/sq mi (178.92/km^{2})
- Time zone: UTC-6 (Central (CST))
  - Summer (DST): UTC-5 (CDT)
- ZIP code: 74442
- Area codes: 539/918
- FIPS code: 40-36950
- GNIS feature ID: 2412793

Indianola is a town in Pittsburg County, Oklahoma, United States. As of the 2020 census, the community had 148 residents.

== History ==
Indianola probably began in 1875, when H. M. McElhany moved to the area and opened a one-room store. The store also served as a mail drop for local residents. The mail was delivered by horseback from the nearby town of Canadian, Oklahoma. McElhany stayed in business for about three years, then sold the store to Albert S. Cornelison and James H. Bynum. An actual post office was established at Indianola, Indian Territory on January 16, 1891, with Bynum being appointed as the first postmaster.

At the time of its founding, Indianola was located in Tobucksy County, Choctaw Nation.

According to the Encyclopedia of Oklahoma History and Culture, there are two versions of how the community acquired its name. One version says the name was on a stove in the general store. The other version says that the name honored Indianola, Mississippi.

The first school in Indianola was organized in February 1895. In 1898, Lyman H. Perkins, a Choctaw farmer who had originally all the land on which Indianola was built, donated 1 acre (0.40 ha) for construction of a Methodist church. In 1902, the Fort Smith and Western Railway built a track north of town. Indianola quickly relocated to be adjacent to the track, and the residents built a new school building. Lyman Perkins and his wife donated 4 acres (1.6 ha) to the new town, which retained the name Indianola. The former site was simply called "Old Town." By 1910, the community claimed 781 residents, which was the all-time high.

== Geography ==
Indianola is located on the south bank of the South Canadian River, approximately 18 miles (29 km) north of McAlester.

According to the United States Census Bureau, the town has a total area of 0.3 square miles (0.78 km^{2}), all land. Indianola is 211 meters above sea level.

== Demographics ==
Historical population
Census	Pop.	Note	%±
1910	481		—
1920	415		−13.7%
1930	378		−8.9%
1940	311		−17.7%
1950	314		1.0%
1960	234		−25.5%
1970	205		−12.4%
1980	254		23.9%
1990	171		−32.7%
2000	191		11.7%
2010	162		−15.2%
2020	148		−8.6%
U.S. Decennial Census

As of the census of 2000, there were 191 people, 72 households, and 52 families residing in the town. The population density was 613.3 inhabitants per square mile (236.8/km^{2}). There were 76 housing units at an average density of 244.0 per square mile (94.2/km^{2}). The racial makeup of the town was 90.58% White, 6.28% Native American, and 3.14% from two or more races.

There were 72 households, out of which 31.9% had children under the age of 18 living with them, 59.7% were married couples living together, 11.1% had a female householder with no husband present, and 26.4% were non-families. 25.0% of all households were made up of individuals, and 12.5% had someone living alone who was 65 years of age or older. The average household size was 2.65 and the average family size was 3.17.

In the town, the population was spread out, with 29.3% under the age of 18, 11.5% from 18 to 24, 22.5% from 25 to 44, 21.5% from 45 to 64, and 15.2% who were 65 years of age or older. The median age was 36 years. For every 100 females, there were 103.2 males. For every 100 females age 18 and over, there were 114.3 males.

The median income for a household in the town was $32,969, and the median income for a family was $32,031. Males had a median income of $23,750 versus $24,375 for females. The per capita income for the town was $18,908. About 7.3% of families and 7.8% of the population were below the poverty line, including none of those under the age of eighteen and 21.4% of those 65 or over.

== Economy ==
Agriculture has been the mainstay of Indianola's economy, with cotton being the main cash crop. Other major crops produced around the town have been corn, grains, soybeans, peanuts, and onions.
