= Checotah, Oklahoma =

Checotah, Oklahoma Cokotv (Creek)
- City
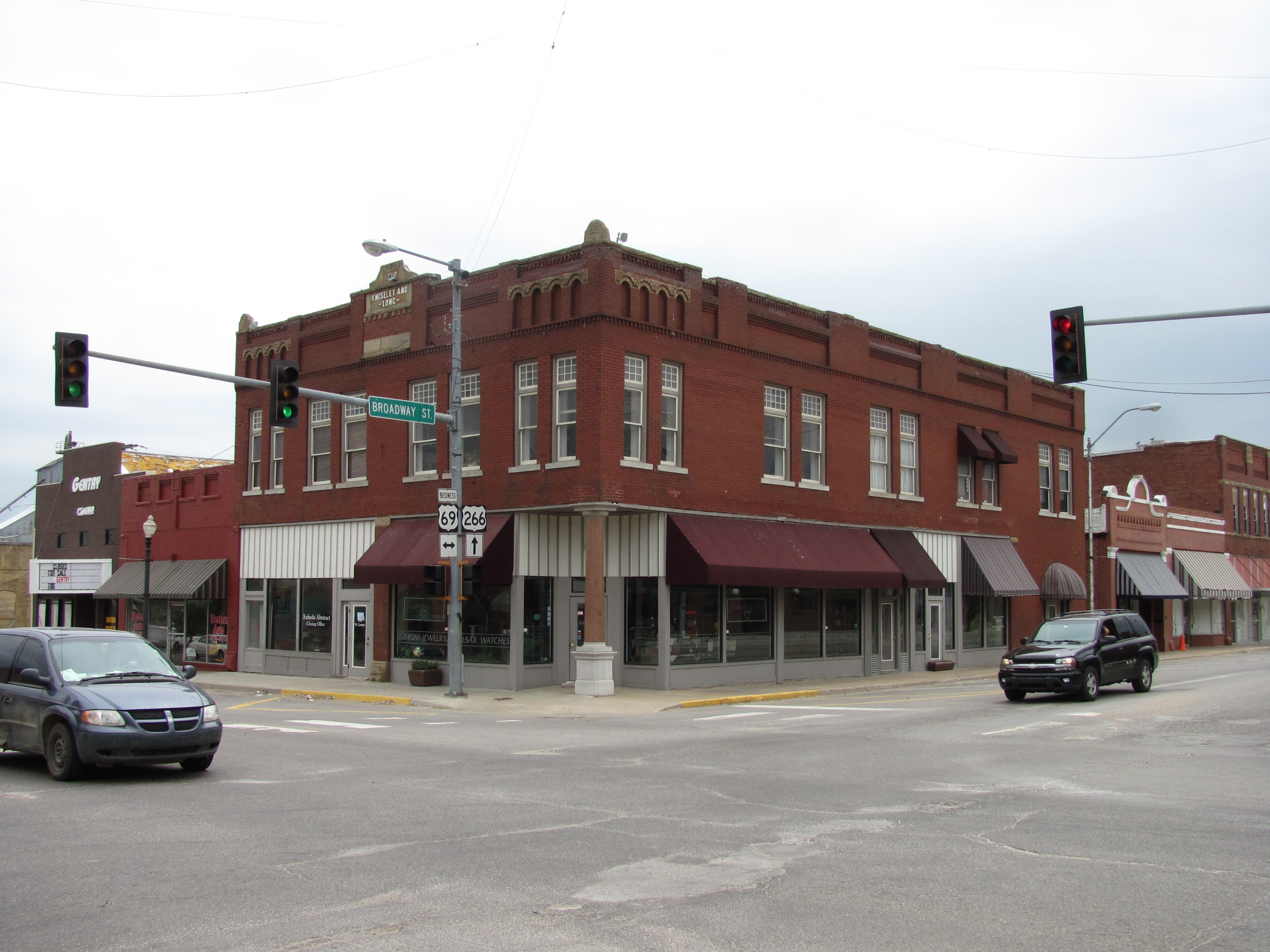
- Kniseley and Long Building
- Nicknames: "Steer Wrestling Capital of the World" "Gem of the Prairie"
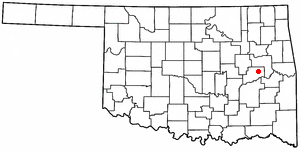
- Location in Oklahoma
- Coordinates: 35°28′55″N 95°31′21″W
- Country: United States
- State: Oklahoma
- County: McIntosh

Area
  - Total: 9.03 sq mi (23.39 km^{2})
  - Land: 8.97 sq mi (23.22 km^{2})
  - Water: 0.066 sq mi (0.17 km^{2})
- Elevation: 620 ft (190 m)

Population (2020)
  - Total: 3,018
  - Density: 336.6/sq mi (129.97/km^{2})
- Time zone: UTC-6 (Central (CST))
  - Summer (DST): UTC-5 (CDT)
- ZIP Code: 74426
- Area codes: 539/918
- FIPS code: 40-13650
- GNIS feature ID: 2409438
- Website: www.cityofchecotah.com

Checotah (Creek: Cokotv) is a city in McIntosh County, Oklahoma, United States. It was named for Samuel Checote, the first chief of the Creek Nation elected after the Civil War. Its population was 3,018 at the 2020 census, down from 3,335 in 2010.

Checotah is home to numerous antique malls, a Civil War battle site, and a downtown historic district. Checotah claims to be the steer wrestling capital of the world. Early boosters called Checotah "The Gem of the Prairie".

== History ==
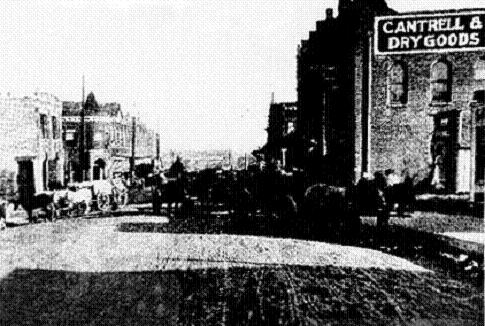
A street scene in Checotah around 1900

The Missouri–Kansas–Texas Railroad (also known as the MKT or Katy) established a railhead on the old Texas Road in 1872 that became the site of present-day Checotah. Although it was named "Checote Switch" for Samuel Checote, a later mapmaker spelled the name as Checotah. The town was chartered by the Creek Nation in 1893. The Dawes Commission held its first meeting here.

Between 1907 and 1909, the people of Checotah were involved in a dispute with nearby Eufaula known as the McIntosh County Seat War. After Checotah was designated as the new county seat, the people of Eufaula refused to hand over the county records. Soon after, a group of heavily armed men from Checotah attempted to seize the records from the courthouse in Eufaula, but were beaten back and forced to surrender during the gunfight that followed. Eufaula was designated as the permanent seat of McIntosh County one year later.

Checotah was on the route of the Jefferson Highway established in 1915, with that road running more than 2,300 miles (3,700 km) from Winnipeg, Manitoba, to New Orleans, Louisiana.

== Geography ==
Checotah is located in northeastern McIntosh County at an elevation of 652 feet (199 m) northeast of the intersection of Interstate 40 and U.S. Route 69. I-40 leads east 65 miles (105 km) to Fort Smith, Arkansas, and west 116 miles (187 km) to Oklahoma City, while US 69 leads north 22 miles (35 km) to Muscogee and south 13 miles (21 km) to Eufaula.

According to the U.S. Census Bureau, the city has a total area of 9.0 sq mi (23 km^{2}), of which 0.06 square miles (0.16 km^{2}), or 0.71%, are covered by water. Eufaula Lake, a reservoir on the Canadian River, is the largest-capacity lake wholly within the state of Oklahoma and is 5 miles (8 km) to the west of Checotah.

== Demographics ==
Historical population
Census	Pop.	Note	%±
1900	805		—
1910	1,683		109.1%
1920	2,390		42.0%
1930	2,110		−11.7%
1940	2,126		0.8%
1950	2,638		24.1%
1960	2,614		−0.9%
1970	3,074		17.6%
1980	3,454		12.4%
1990	3,290		−4.7%
2000	3,481		5.8%
2010	3,335		−4.2%
2020	3,018		−9.5%
U.S. Decennial Census

=== 2020 census ===
As of the 2020 census, Checotah had a population of 3,018. The median age was 40.4 years. 24.5% of residents were under the age of 18 and 21.6% of residents were 65 years of age or older. For every 100 females there were 86.5 males, and for every 100 females age 18 and over there were 80.5 males age 18 and over.

<0.1% of residents lived in urban areas, while 100.0% lived in rural areas.

There were 1,233 households in Checotah, of which 30.8% had children under the age of 18 living in them. Of all households, 38.4% were married-couple households, 18.9% were households with a male householder and no spouse or partner present, and 37.3% were households with a female householder and no spouse or partner present. About 32.5% of all households were made up of individuals and 17.8% had someone living alone who was 65 years of age or older.

There were 1,451 housing units, of which 15.0% were vacant. Among occupied housing units, 60.7% were owner-occupied and 39.3% were renter-occupied. The homeowner vacancy rate was 1.4% and the rental vacancy rate was 10.3%.

Racial composition as of the 2020 census
Race	Percent
White	60.6%
Black or African American	4.1%
American Indian and Alaska Native	19.5%
Asian	0.9%
Native Hawaiian and Other Pacific Islander	<0.1%
Some other race	1.7%
Two or more races	13.3%
Hispanic or Latino (of any race)	4.0%

=== 2000 census ===
As of the census of 2000, 3,481 people, 1,389 households, and 912 families were residing in the city. The population density was 389.3 inhabitants per square mile (150.3/km^{2}). The 1,576 housing units had an average density of 176.3 per square mile (68.1/km^{2}). The racial makeup of the city was 67.91% White, 6.92% African American, 15.91% Native American, 0.23% Asian, 0.09% Pacific Islander, 0.40% from other races, and 8.53% from two or more races. Hispanics or Latinos of any race were 1.29% of the population.

Of the 1,389 households, 31.5% had children under 18 living with them, 44.9% were married couples living together, 17.7% had a female householder with no husband present, and 34.3% were not families. About 31.5% of all households were made up of individuals, and 18.4% had someone living alone who was 65 or older. The average household size was 2.39, and the average family size was 2.98.

In the city, the age distribution was 26.1% under 18, 8.2% from 18 to 24, 23.7% from 25 to 44, 20.3% from 45 to 64, and 21.7% who were 65 or older. The median age was 39 years. For every 100 females, there were 77.7 males. For every 100 females 18 and over, there were 72.5 males.

The median income for a household in the city was $22,029, and for a family was $30,741. Males had a median income of $26,094 versus $17,298 for females. The per capita income for the city was $15,921. About 16.1% of families and 20.4% of the population were below the poverty line, including 23.4% of those under 18 and 7.6% of those 65 or over. The median house value is $50,500.

== National Register of Historic Places ==
Checotah has multiple sites on the National Register of Historic Places listings in McIntosh County, Oklahoma, including the Checotah Business District (Gentry Ave between W 1st and W Main Sts., and Broadway Ave between Lafayette and Spaulding Aves), Checotah City Hall (201 N Broadway), Checotah MKT Depot (Paul Carr Dr.), the Methodist Episcopal Church (South) (419 W. Gentry St.), the Oklahoma Odd Fellows Home at Checotah (211 W North St.), and the Tabor House (631 W. Lafayette).

== Honey Springs Battlefield ==
Checotah considers itself the host of the Honey Springs Battlefield, which is 4.5 miles (7.2 km) northeast of town.

== Popular culture ==
- American Idol winner Carrie Underwood wrote a song on her album Some Hearts called "I Ain't in Checotah Anymore". It includes references to the local high-school team (Wildcats), Highways 69 and 40, the Okra Fest (no longer held), and Eufaula Lake.

== Notable people ==
- Paul H. Carr, Silver Star recipient
- Woody Crumbo, Native American artist; lived and worked in Checotah
- Merle Haggard's parents James Francis Haggard and Flossie Mae Harp
- Jim G. Lucas (1914–1970), journalist and war correspondent, winner of Pulitzer Prize in Journalism
- Mel McDaniel, country musician
- Tracy Scroggins, NFL linebacker
- Carrie Underwood, Grammy Award-winning country musician
