= Canadian, Oklahoma =

- Town
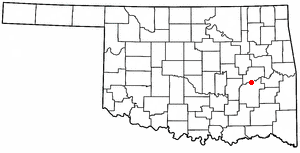
- Location of Canadian, Oklahoma
- Coordinates: 35°10′26″N 95°38′58″W
- Country: United States
- State: Oklahoma
- County: Pittsburg

Area
  - Total: 0.76 sq mi (1.96 km^{2})
  - Land: 0.76 sq mi (1.96 km^{2})
  - Water: 0 sq mi (0.00 km^{2})
- Elevation: 725 ft (221 m)

Population (2020)
  - Total: 143
  - Density: 189.2/sq mi (73.04/km^{2})
- Time zone: UTC-6 (Central (CST))
  - Summer (DST): UTC-5 (CDT)
- ZIP code: 74425
- Area codes: 539/918
- FIPS code: 40-11450
- GNIS feature ID: 2413156

Canadian is a town in Pittsburg County, Oklahoma, United States. As of the 2020 census, the community had 143 residents.

== History ==
At the time of its founding, Canadian was located in Tobucksy County, Choctaw Nation, in the Indian Territory. The settlement was originally called South Canadian, taking its name from the nearby South Fork of the Canadian River, now called Gaines Creek. A post office was established at South Canadian, Indian Territory on May 29, 1873. The name was changed to Canadian on December 11, 1899.

During the Civil War, the nearby Canadian Depot was an important supply depot.

== Geography ==
According to the United States Census Bureau, the town has a total area of 0.8 square miles (2.1 km^{2}), all land.

== Demographics ==
Historical population
Census	Pop.	Note	%±
1900	522		—
1910	481		−7.9%
1920	373		−22.5%
1930	295		−20.9%
1940	385		30.5%
1950	277		−28.1%
1960	255		−7.9%
1970	304		19.2%
1980	279		−8.2%
1990	261		−6.5%
2000	239		−8.4%
2010	220		−7.9%
2020	143		−35.0%
U.S. Decennial Census

=== 2020 census ===
As of the 2020 census, Canadian had a population of 143. The median age was 42.5 years. 25.2% of residents were under the age of 18 and 22.4% of residents were 65 years of age or older. For every 100 females there were 110.3 males, and for every 100 females age 18 and over there were 98.1 males age 18 and over.

0.0% of residents lived in urban areas, while 100.0% lived in rural areas.

There were 58 households in Canadian, of which 36.2% had children under the age of 18 living in them. Of all households, 55.2% were married-couple households, 13.8% were households with a male householder and no spouse or partner present, and 22.4% were households with a female householder and no spouse or partner present. About 12.0% of all households were made up of individuals and 8.6% had someone living alone who was 65 years of age or older.

There were 73 housing units, of which 20.5% were vacant. The homeowner vacancy rate was 0.0% and the rental vacancy rate was 12.5%.

Racial composition as of the 2020 census
Race	Number	Percent
White	124	86.7%
Black or African American	0	0.0%
American Indian and Alaska Native	11	7.7%
Asian	0	0.0%
Native Hawaiian and Other Pacific Islander	0	0.0%
Some other race	0	0.0%
Two or more races	8	5.6%
Hispanic or Latino (of any race)	1	0.7%

=== 2000 census ===
As of the census of 2000, there were 239 people, 99 households, and 62 families residing in the town. The population density was 318.9 inhabitants per square mile (123.1/km^{2}). There were 114 housing units at an average density of 152.1 per square mile (58.7/km^{2}). The racial makeup of the town was 79.50% White, 12.55% Native American, and 7.95% from two or more races.

There were 99 households, out of which 28.3% had children under the age of 18 living with them, 47.5% were married couples living together, 11.1% had a female householder with no husband present, and 36.4% were non-families. 30.3% of all households were made up of individuals, and 20.2% had someone living alone who was 65 years of age or older. The average household size was 2.41 and the average family size was 2.98.

In the town, the population was spread out, with 26.4% under the age of 18, 7.9% from 18 to 24, 19.2% from 25 to 44, 30.5% from 45 to 64, and 15.9% who were 65 years of age or older. The median age was 42 years. For every 100 females, there were 94.3 males. For every 100 females age 18 and over, there were 83.3 males.

The median income for a household in the town was $18,281, and the median income for a family was $31,250. Males had a median income of $21,750 versus $27,188 for females. The per capita income for the town was $13,824. About 20.0% of families and 27.4% of the population were below the poverty line, including 34.0% of those under the age of eighteen and 20.0% of those 65 or over.

== Notable people ==
Paranormal romance author, Kitt Lynn, was raised in Canadian. She still lives in Oklahoma.

Holly Holland, an eight-year-old girl who won a writing contest for the children's television series Arthur and had her concept air in the show's 1999 episode "The Contest".

Charles F. Carey, Jr., United States Medal of Honor recipient and Army Technical Sergeant, was born in Canadian. Carey, Jr. was an Army Infantryman during World War II who earned the posthumous Medal of Honor for commanding his outnumbered antitank battalion into positions of tactical survival, in 1945.
