= Vylon =

Vylon may refer to:

- Vylon, the father of Sigurd and Ethlyn and a minor non-playable character in Fire Emblem: Seisen no Keifu
- Vylon, the main global manufacture and supplier of Toyobo brand for Copolyester
