= List of military units and installations in Oklahoma =

The armed forces in the United States have built a number of military installations in the state of Oklahoma. Some of these units remain in operation. A number of military installations in Oklahoma operated before or during the Civil War era.

== Army / Army National Guard ==
- Fort Sill – Lawton

- 31st Air Defense Artillery Brigade
- 75th Fires Brigade
- 214th Fires Brigade
- Henry Post Army Airfield – KFSI
- United States Army Air Defense Artillery School
- United States Army Field Artillery School

- McAlester Army Ammunition Plant – McAlester/Savanna

- Defense Ammunition Center

- Oklahoma Army National Guard

- 45th Fires Brigade – Mustang (HIMARS)
- 45th Infantry Brigade Combat Team – Norman
- 90th Troop Command – Oklahoma City
- Camp Gruber Maneuver Training Center – Braggs
- Hal Muldrow Army Aviation Support Facility – Lexington – KHMY
- Oklahoma Regional Training Institute – Oklahoma City

== Navy ==
- Strategic Communications Wing One – Tinker AFB

== Air Force / Air Force Reserve / Air National Guard ==
- Altus Air Force Base – Altus – KLTS

- 97th Air Mobility Wing

- Kegelman Air Force Auxiliary Field – Jet – KCKA

- 71st Flying Training Wing

- Tinker Air Force Base – Oklahoma City/Midwest City – KTIK

- 10th Flight Test Squadron
- 38th Cyberspace Engineering Group
- 72d Air Base Wing
- 76th Maintenance Wing
- 448th Supply Chain Management Wing
- 507th Air Refueling Wing
- 513th Air Control Group
- 552d Air Control Wing
- Oklahoma City Air Logistics Complex

- Vance Air Force Base – Enid – KEND

- 71st Flying Training Wing

- Oklahoma Air National Guard

- 125th Weather Flight – Tinker AFB
- 137th Special Operation Wing – Will Rogers ANGB
- 138th Fighter Wing – Tulsa ANGB
- 146th Air Support Operations Squadron – Will Rogers ANGB
- 205th Engineering Installation Squadron – Will Rogers ANGB

== Marine Corps ==
- USMC Artillery Detachment – Fort Sill – All Marine Field Artillerymen – both officer and enlisted – are trained at the United States Army Field Artillery Training Center.

== Coast Guard ==
- Aids to Navigation Unit – Sallisaw

- USCGC Muskingum (WLR-75402) – River Buoy Tender.

- Coast Guard Institute – Oklahoma City
- Container Inspection Training and Assistance Team at Mike Monroney Aeronautical Center – Oklahoma City

== Former / closed military installations ==
- Fort Gibson (1824–1890). In Muskogee County. Established to maintain peace on the frontier of the American West and to protect the southwestern border of the Louisiana Purchase. Named after Major General George Gibson (1775–1861) who served in the War of 1812 (1812–1815) and the First Seminole War (1814–1819).
- Fort Towson (1824–1865). In Choctaw County. Established as a fortification on the international boundary with Mexico (Texas), and as a curb to lawlessness in the region. It was also intended to serve as a buffer between Plains Indians to the west and the Choctaw, who were slated for removal to the area from Mississippi. Named after Major General Nathaniel Towson (1784–1854) who served in the War of 1812 (1812–1815) and the Mexican–American War (1846–1848). Confederate Brigadier General Stand Watie surrendered to Union forces at Fort Towson on June 23, 1865. Watie was the last confederate general in the field to surrender.
- Old Fort Arbuckle (1833–1834). In Tulsa County. It served as a forward operating base for the First Dragoon Expedition. Named after Brigadier General Matthew Arbuckle (1778–1851) who served in the War of 1812 (1812–1815).
- Fort Coffee (1834–1838). In LeFlore County. Established to stop the influx of illegal whiskey and other contraband coming into Indian Territory from Arkansas. Named after Brigadier General John Coffee (1772–1833) who served in the War of 1812 (1812–1815) and the Creek War (1813–1814).
- Camp Holmes (May-Aug. 1835). In Cleveland County. The outpost was used as a council grounds for talks between the U.S. Government Stokes Commission and Indian tribes from the southern plains. Called Camp Holmes after Major Theophilus Holmes (1804–1880) who served in the Second Seminole War (1835–1842) and the Mexican–American War (1846–1848). During the Civil War, Holmes sided with the Confederacy, where he attained the rank of lieutenant general.
- Fort Wayne (1838–1842). In Delaware County. Established to protect a military road connecting frontier fortifications and to ease the fear of Cherokee depredations in Arkansas. Named after Major General Anthony Wayne (1745–1796) who served in the American Revolutionary War (1775–1783).
- Fort Washita (1842–1870). In Bryan County. Established to protect the Chickasaw from aggressive Plains Indian tribes and unscrupulous whites, and it also stood guard over the Texas frontier. Named after the Washita River.
- Camp Arbuckle (1850–1851). In McClain County. Established to stop raids by Plains Indian tribes on immigrant trains headed west to California and on settlements of Choctaws and Chickasaws in Indian Territory. Named after Brigadier General Matthew Arbuckle (1778–1851) who served in the War of 1812 (1812–1815). The site proved unacceptable, however, and was abandoned in 1851. The troops relocated the post approximately 28 miles to the south-southwest (201 degrees heading, True) to a position on Wild Horse Creek in present Garvin County.
- Fort Arbuckle (1851–1870). In Garvin County. Established to stop raids by Plains Indian tribes on immigrant trains headed west to California and on settlements of Choctaws and Chickasaws in Indian Territory. Named after Brigadier General Matthew Arbuckle (1778–1851) who served in the War of 1812 (1812–1815).
- Camp Radziminski (1858–1859) in Kiowa County. The camp was used by troops from Fort Belknap, Texas as a forward operating base to pursue Kiowa and Comanche raiders. Named after First Lieutenant Charles Radziminski (1805–1858) who served in the Mexican–American War (1846–1848).
- Fort Cobb (1859–1869). In Caddo County. Established to protect relocated Native Americans from raids by the Comanche, Kiowa and Cheyenne. Named after Howell Cobb (1815–1868) who was the 22nd Secretary of the Treasury.
- Fort Davis (1861–1862). In Muskogee County. It was the principal Confederate outpost in northern Indian Territory, named after Jefferson Davis (1807–1889) who was the President of the Confederate States of America (1861–1865).
- Fort McCulloch (1862–1865). In Bryan County. Main Confederate fortification in southern Indian Territory. Named for Confederate Brigadier General Benjamin McCulloch (1811–1862) McCulloch had also served in the Texas Revolution (1835–1836) and the Mexican–American War (1846–1848) where he was a major general with the Texas Militia.
- Camp Pike (1862–1865). In Haskell County. Confederate outpost. Named after Confederate Brigadier General Albert Pike (1809–1891). Pike had also served in the Mexican–American War (1846–1848) as a captain.
- Camp Nichols (Jun.-Nov. 1865). In Cimarron County. Established to protect the Cimarron Cut-off of the Santa Fe Trail from marauding parties of Kiowas and Comanches. Named after Captain Charles Nichols of the 1st Regiment California Volunteer Cavalry who served in the Civil War (1861–1865).
- Fort Supply (1868–1895). In Woodward County. Established as a supply base for General Philip Sheridan's winter campaign against the Southern Plains Indians, thus the name Fort Supply.
- Fort Reno (1874–1948). In Canadian County. Established to protect the Cheyenne-Arapaho Agency at Darlington following an Indian outbreak that led to the Red River War of 1874. In 1908 the post became a U.S. Army Remount Depot until 1948. Named after Major General Jesse Reno (1823–1862) who served in the Mexican–American War (1846–1848), the Utah War (1857–1858), and the Civil War (1861–1865).
- Cantonment (1879–1882) In Blaine County. In September 1878 a band of Northern Cheyenne had fled northward from the Cheyenne and Arapaho Reservation, causing panic among the residents of western Kansas and Nebraska. With orders to police the reservation, Colonel Richard Dodge (1827–1895) and four companies of the Twenty-third Infantry from Fort Leavenworth, Kansas, established the Cantonment midway between Forts Reno and Supply in March 1879. It was never officially named as cantonment, which is a term for a temporary military fortification.
- Muskogee AAF/Davis Field (1941–1947) (As an Air Reserve Base: 1956–1967) Named in honor of Muskogee native Jack Davis, who was killed in action in the South Pacific during World War II, Davis Field was previously known as the Muskogee Army Airfield. Built in 1941 42 by the War Department, the initial runway was constructed by commandeering a straight stretch of U.S. Highway 64. The facility was leased by the federal government in October 1942 to serve as a Ground Air Support Base to nearby Camp Gruber. It was also used as a combat-crew training site for aerial photographic reconnaissance during World War II.
- Naval Air Station Clinton (1942–1969) In Washita County. Trained naval aviators during World War II. The U.S. Navy left the area in 1946. In 1954 the U.S. Air Force took over the site to train bomber pilots and the name was changed to Clinton-Sherman Air Force Base. In 1959 Clinton-Sherman became a bomber base housing B-52 Stratofortresses. The air force vacated the area in 1969. Named after the nearby city of Clinton and the Sherman Iron Works, who had set up shop after the navy left to scrap surplus World War II naval aircraft.
- Naval Air Station Norman (1942–1959) In Cleveland County. Used in World War II to train naval aviators. Also had Naval Air Technical Training Center Norman which taught the maintenance on the aircraft. The navy moved out in 1946 but came back in 1952 because of the Korean War. The area was transferred to the University of Oklahoma in 1959. Named after the nearby city of Norman.
- Ardmore Air Force Base (1942–1959) In Carter County. Started out as Ardmore Army Air Field during World War II. Trained B-17 Flying Fortress and B-26 Marauder crews and CG-4 glider pilots. The army vacated in 1945 but the air force came back in 1953. From 1953 to 1959 cargo planes were stationed here. C-119 Flying Boxcar, YC-122 Avitruc, C-123 Provider and C-130 Hercules. Named after nearby city of Ardmore.
- Frederick Army Airfield (1942–1945) In Tillman County. Trained bomber crews during World War II. Aircraft that were based here for training purposes were the A-20 Havoc, B-17 Flying Fortress, B-24 Liberator, B-25 Mitchell and B-26 Marauder. Named after nearby city of Frederick. Today it is the headquarters for the World War II Airborne Demonstration Team Foundation which maintains two flyable C-47 Skytrain transports.
- U.S. Coast Guard LORAN-C Station Boise City (1990–2010) In Cimarron County. Enabled aircraft to determine their position and speed using radio signals. Named for nearby city of Boise City. LORAN station was actually at Felt.
- There were 11 prisoners of war base camps, 22 POW branch camps, 3 POW hospitals, 3 enemy alien internment camps and 4 POW cemeteries in Oklahoma during World War II.
- On July 1, 1961, the 577th Strategic Missile Squadron was activated at Altus Air Force Base and established twelve missile silo sites in a 40-mile radius around Altus, each with one Atlas-F nuclear missile. Of the twelve sites, all but one were located in Oklahoma. The squadron inactivated on March 25, 1965, when the Atlas-F was phased out in favor of the Titan II missile. All silo sites were subsequently demilitarized and sold to private owners.

== See also ==
- 45th Infantry Division Museum – Oklahoma City.
- Boise City Bomb Memorial – Boise City. Boise City bombed by mistake on a training mission during World War II.
- Brigadier General Stand Watie Grave Site – Grove. Last Confederate general to surrender.
- Cabin Creek Civil War Battle Site – Pensacola. Two Civil War battles fought here.
- Confederate Memorial Museum & Cemetery – Atoka
- Fort Gibson Historic Site & Interpretative Center – Fort Gibson
- Fort Gibson National Cemetery – Fort Gibson.
- Fort Sill Museum – Lawton.
- Fort Sill National Cemetery – Elgin.
- Fort Supply Historic Site – Fort Supply
- Fort Towson Historic Site – Fort Towson
- Fort Washita Historic Site & Museum – Durant
- General Tommy Franks Leadership Institute and Museum – Hobart.
- Historic Fort Reno – El Reno
- Honey Springs Battlefield Historic Site – Rentiesville. Largest Civil War battle fought in Oklahoma.
- Lieutenant General Thomas Stafford Air & Space Museum – Weatherford.
- Mount Scott – Wichita Mountains Wildlife Refuge. Named after Lieutenant General Winfield Scott.
- USS Oklahoma (BB-37) (1916–1944) – Battleship. Served in World War I. Sunk in the Attack on Pearl Harbor. Sunk by carrier-based aircraft torpedoes, raised in 1943, sank 17 May 1947 in a storm while being towed to San Francisco for scrapping. In 2003, the U.S. Navy recovered part of the mast of the Oklahoma from the bottom of Pearl Harbor. In 2007, it was flown to Tinker AFB, then delivered to War Memorial Park in Muskogee for permanent display.
- USS Tulsa (PG-22) (1923–1946) – Patrol Gunboat. Served in World War II. Scrapped in 1948.
- USS Batfish (SS-310) (1943–1969) – Submarine. On display at War Memorial Park in Muskogee. Served in World War II.
- USS Muskogee (PF-49) (1944–1945) – Patrol Frigate. Served in World War II. Transferred to Soviet Navy as part of Project Hula.
- USS Oklahoma City (CL-91) (1944–1979) – Light Cruiser. Served in World War II and the Vietnam War. Sunk as a target in 1999, southwest of Guam.
- USS Oklahoma City (SSN-723) (1988–2022) – Nuclear powered attack submarine. Home port at Naval Base Guam.
- USS Tulsa (LCS-16) – Littoral Combat Ship. Funding appropriated 5 Mar. 2013. Ship named 6 Jun. 2013. Laid down 11 Jan. 2016. Commissioned 16 Feb. 2019. Homeported at Naval Base San Diego. Ship built by Austal USA in Mobile, Alabama.
- Washita Battlefield National Historic Site – Cheyenne
- World War II Airborne Demonstration Team Foundation – Frederick. A non-profit 501(c)(3) organization located in the historic former Frederick Army Airfield portion of the airport. In addition to its museum functions focused on World War II U.S. Army airborne infantry/paratrooper operations, the team also maintains two flyable C-47 Skytrain transports in one of the airport's remaining World War II military hangars. Painted in U.S. Army Air Forces markings, these aircraft are regularly flown for use in historical reenactments of paratrooper airdrop operations.
