= Holston Army Ammunition Plant =

Facility of the US Army Joint Munitions Command

Coordinates: 36.533°N 82.632°W

Holston Army Ammunition Plant (HSAAP) is an arsenal in Kingsport, Tennessee. The plant manufactures Research Department Explosive (RDX) and High Melting Explosive (HMX) for ammunition production and development. It is a government-owned and contractor-operated (GOCO) facility that is part of the US Army Joint Munitions Command.

== History ==
The Holston Army Ammunition Plant, also known as the Holston Ordnance Works, was constructed by Tennessee Eastman in Kingsport, Tennessee, to manufacture explosives during World War II.

BAE Systems' division Ordnance Systems, Inc. currently operates the plant under a 25-year facilities use contract. On May 12, 2011, the Army announced that BAE Systems had won the contract to operate Radford Army Ammunition Plant in Radford, VA, as well.

== Capabilities ==
Capabilities of the plant include: production and development of insensitive munitions explosives; synthesis and manufacture of high explosives; recrystallization and purification from organic solvents; melt-cast, cast-cured, pressed and extruded explosives formulation; explosives performance testing; full-spectrum explosives research and development capability; and custom and fine chemical manufacture for the defense industry. ^{Information Provided by the Joint Munitions Command}

== Current operations ==
The current plant is on two sites: Plant A is in Kingsport, and Plant B is about 4 miles (6.4 km) away in a less developed part of Hawkins County. The two plants are connected by rail. Plant A has 120 acres (0.49 km^{2}). Plant B has 5,900 acres (24 km^{2}). The site as a whole includes 465 buildings.

== History ==
Holston Ordnance Works [HOW] was established in July 1942 and stopped production in 1945. It was reactivated in 1949 during the Cold War and continues today. The installation was renamed Holston Army Ammunition Plant [HSAAP or HAAP] in the early 1960s. Holston Defense Corporation operated the facility from 1949 through 1999 under a series of cost reimbursement contracts with the U. S. Army.

The plant was constructed 1942–1944 for use by the government contractor Tennessee Eastman Corporation, a subsidiary of Eastman Kodak. During World War II, it manufactured Composition B, a very powerful explosive mixture of RDX and TNT. The facility was placed in standby status after World War II, producing only fertilizer, until it was reactivated in 1949 under the Holston Defense Corporation, a new subsidiary of Eastman Kodak.

During the Korean War, the plant continued to manufacture Composition B as well as rework its stockpiled Composition B. New production lines were built during 1951–1954 in order to produce for the war. However, after the Korean War it was reduced to a one-line operation. It did not resume large-scale production until the mid-1960s when it was again modernized to produce large amounts of Composition B for the Vietnam War.

After 1973, production was again reduced to a much smaller amount, but the plant also began producing "special order" explosives and propellants for the Armed Services, including the Navy's Trident missile program. It also handles and stores material for the national defense stockpile.

As of 1988, the plant produced all of the RDX/HMX consumed in the United States, and 90 percent of that used by all of the nations friendly to the USA.

== Facilities ==
HSAAP is housed on 6,024 acres (24.38 km^{2}), with 325 buildings, 130 igloos and storage capacity of 275,000 square feet (25,500 m^{2}).^{Information Provided by the Joint Munitions Command}
