= Anniston =

Anniston may refer to:

- Anniston, Alabama
- Anniston, Missouri
- Anniston Munitions Center
- Anniston (Amtrak station)
- USS Anniston, a.k.a. USS Montgomery (C-9)

== See also ==
- Aniston (disambiguation)
