= Aniston =

Aniston is a surname and a given name. Notable people with the name include:

- Jennifer Aniston (born 1969), American actress
- John Aniston (1933–2022), Greek-American actor
- Nicole Aniston, American adult film actress
- Aniston Fernandes (born 1993), Indian footballer

== See also ==
- Anniston (disambiguation)
