= Crane Army Ammunition Activity =

Facility of the US Army Joint Munitions Command

Coordinates: 38.8911°N 86.831267°W

Crane Army Ammunition Activity (CAAA) in Crane, Indiana produces and provides conventional munitions requirements in support of United States Army and Joint Force readiness. It is one of 17 installations of the Joint Munitions Command and one of 23 organic industrial bases under the U.S. Army Materiel Command, which include arsenals, depots, activities and ammunition plants. Established in October 1977, it is located on Naval Support Activity Crane.

== Capabilities ==
Capabilities of the center include: munitions and manufacturing; demilitarization; munitions and munitions-related maintenance and renovation; remote operations and environmental testing; logistics support; machine shop; chemical laboratory; and engineering.

== History ==
Crane Army Ammunition Activity (CAAA) was established on October 1, 1977, when the Army was designated as the single manager for conventional ammunition for the Department of Defense. CAAA inherited a legacy mission of conventional ammunition manufacturing, storage and depot operations from what had previously been known as Naval Ammunition Depot, Crane, born in 1941 when the Navy needed an inland munitions depot during World War II.

CAAA became one of two major tenants on Naval Support Activity (NSA) Crane, eventually employing more than 700 employees and occupying 51,220 acres of land and 4.8 million square feet in buildings on the base. CAAA's manufacturing product lines grew to include countermeasure decoy flares, mortar and artillery illumination, signals and markers, loading assembly and packing of medium caliber munitions, Navy gun ammunition, Air Force and Navy bomb maintenance, explosive melt/pour and press load operations. CAAA also remained focused on its logistical mission set, storing and distributing approximately 25% of the DoD's conventional munitions valued at $9.8 billion, making it one of the largest ammunition depots in the DoD. On October 1, 1999, command and control of the Letterkenny Munitions Center (LEMC) in Chambersburg, PA, transferred to CAAA where it was aligned as a directorate in CAAA's organizational structure. CAAA's commander was also given responsibility for oversight of the Iowa and Milan Army Ammunition Plants.

=== Command ===
Col. Franyate Taylor became the 21st commander of Crane Army Ammunition Activity during a change of command ceremony on July 20, 2023.

== Facilities ==
The facilities at CAAA include more than 200 production buildings, a 72,000-square-foot (6,700 m^{2}) machine shop, roughly 1,800 storage buildings for both explosive and inert ammunition with a total capacity of 4,800,000 square feet (450,000 m^{2}), an 80-acre (320,000 m^{2}) demolition range and 40 acres (160,000 m^{2}) of ammunition burning grounds.

Renovation Ordnance and pyrotechnic renovation work is accomplished in any number of flexible manufacturing units. Remote defusing and refusing capabilities are available for a variety of items. Propellant charge renovation is accomplished in multiple facilities configured with powder lofts. Exterior maintenance is performed on ordnance and ordnance-related items such as containers, metal pallets, and wire cages using grit blasting, high pressure water cutting, degreasing, and painting. Crane also renovates a variety of bombs.

Production Pyrotechnics: Crane produces pyrotechnic devices including signal, smoke, illuminating projectiles, marine location markers, and infrared flares for illumination in conjunction with night vision devices. Crane has produced a variety of aircraft decoy flares.

Cast Load: Crane has the ability to produce cast loaded explosives utilizing various production lines with mixing, melting, and holding kettles. We have the capability to produce bombs, mines, shock test charges, demolition charges, shape charges, burster tubes, underwater sound signals, cluster bombs and projectiles.

Machining Center: Crane's machine shop is equipped with computer numerical control (CNC) machines (mills, lathes, laser fabrication center, wire electrical discharge machine, waterjet, etc.) for a wide variety of materials including tough alloys and metals. Cleaning and finishing processes include chemical cleaning, ultrasonic cleaner, turbo washer, plating titration, atomic absorption, powder coating, statistical process control and workstation automated data collectors.

Logistics Shipping/Receiving: Crane receives, stores and ships a wide variety of conventional ammunition and munitions in support of worldwide operations.

Logistics Facilities: Crane supports its magazines with both rail and truck access, blocking and bracing services and modern containerization facilities. Crane directly supports various units by receiving, storing and shipping their ammunition basic load as required.

Preconfigured Containers: Crane containerizes preconfigured ammunition loads that are delivered directly to troops on the ground, to ships afloat or to prepositioned stocks.

Demilitarization

Disposal: Crane utilizes a wide variety of methods including automated high pressure washout, breakdown, steam-out, permitted open burning and open detonation, contained detonation, water-jet and white phosphorus to phosphoric acid conversion.

Recycling: Crane has the facilities and capability to recycle various materials from a wide variety of ammunition and munitions.

== BRAC 2005 ==
CAAA will gain the detonator, relays and delays workload from Kansas Army Ammunition Plant. It also gained the demolition charges workload from Lone Star Army Ammunition Plant. Both of these facilities were closed due to the 2005 Base Realignment and Closure Commission (BRAC 2005). CAAA will also gain the ammunition demilitarization function from Sierra Army Depot which was another depot realigned by BRAC 2005.
