= Aniston Fernandes =

Indian professional footballer

Personal information
- Date of birth: 4 July 1993 (age 33)
- Place of birth: Betalbatim, Goa, India
- Position: Midfielder

Team information
- Current team: Dempo

Youth career
- 2008–2010: Tata FA
- 2011–2014: Dempo

Senior career*
Years	Team	Apps	(Gls)
2014–	Dempo	1	(0)

International career
2014	India U20		
- * Club domestic league appearances and goals

Aniston Fernandes (born 4 July 1993) is an Indian professional footballer who plays as a midfielder for Dempo in the I-League.

== Career ==
=== Early career ===
Born in Betalbatim, Goa, Fernandes started playing football for his school team at the age of eight while attending St Anthony's High School. He then joined his village school, St Judas High School, before joining the Tata Football Academy in 2008. He then joined the youth team at Dempo in 2011. While at Dempo, Fernandes played for the youth side in the GFA 2nd Division as well as the first-team in the Goa Professional League, the top state league in Goa. Also, in 2011, along with teammate Myron Fernandes, Aniston went abroad to Denmark for three to four months to train at the academy of Danish Superliga side FC Midtjylland.

=== Dempo ===
On 8 March 2014 Fernandes made his professional debut for Dempo in the I-League against Sporting Goa at the Fatorda Stadium. He came on as a 90th-minute substitute for Alwyn George as Dempo won the match 4–0.

== International ==
=== Goa-India ===
On 7 January 2014 it was announced that Fernandes was selected in the 20-man squad for the Goa-India football team that would participate in the 2014 Lusophony Games being played in Goa.

== Career statistics ==
As of 8 March 2014

Club	Season	League			Federation Cup		Durand Cup		AFC		Total	
Club	Season	Division	Apps	Goals	Apps	Goals	Apps	Goals	Apps	Goals	Apps	Goals
Dempo	2013–14	I-League	1	0	0	0	—	—	—	—	1	0
Career total			1	0	0	0	0	0	0	0	1	0

== Honour ==
India U20 (Goa India)

- Lusofonia Games Gold medal: 2014
