= Lake City Army Ammunition Plant =

U.S. government facility in Missouri

- Independence, Missouri in United States
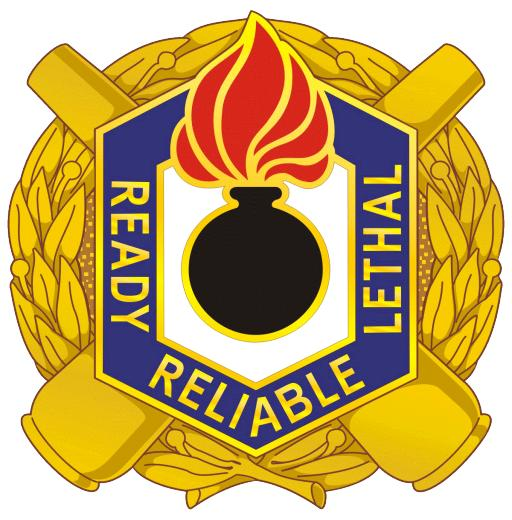
- Crest of Joint Munitions Command

Site information
- Type: Ammunition production facility
- Owner: United States Army
- Operator: Winchester Ammunition
- Controlled by: Joint Munitions Command

Location
- Location of Lake City Army Ammunition Plant Lake City Army Ammunition Plant (the United States)
- Coordinates: 39°06′4″N 94°15′47″W
- Area: 3,935 acres (1,592 ha)

Site history
- Built: 1941
- Built by: Remington Arms

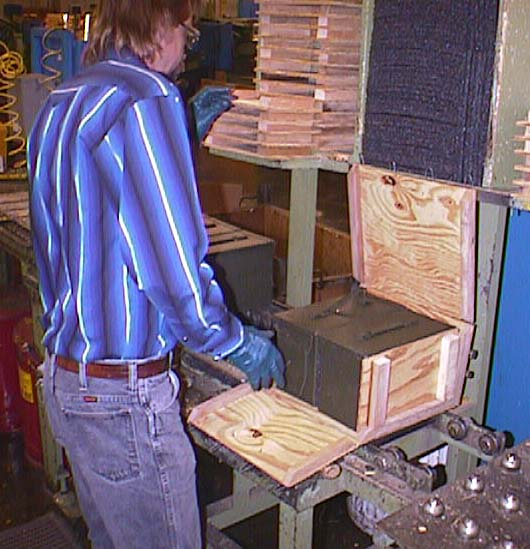
A worker at Lake City Army Ammunition Plant packs two cans of newly manufactured 5.56×45mm NATO ammunition into a wirebound crate. (c. 1998)

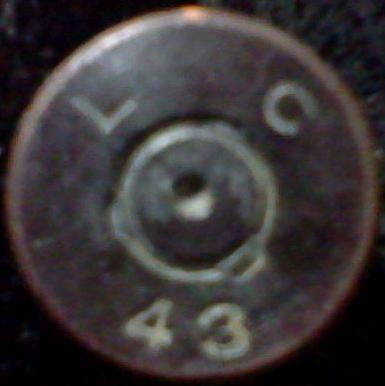
Headstamp of a .50 caliber cartridge casing made at the Lake City Army Ammunition Plant in 1943 and recovered from the Sahuarita Bombing and Gunnery Range in 2012.

Lake City Army Ammunition Plant (LCAAP) is a 3,935-acre (15.92 km^{2}) U.S. government-owned, contractor-operated facility in northeastern Independence, Missouri. It produces ammunition for military and personal rifles.

Lake City was established by Remington Arms in 1941 to manufacture and test small caliber ammunition for the U.S. Army. The facility has remained in continuous operation except for one 5-year period following World War II. As of July 2007, the plant produced nearly 1.4 billion rounds of ammunition per year. In addition, Lake City performs small caliber ammunition stockpile reliability testing and has ammunition and weapon testing responsibilities as the NATO National and Regional Test Center. LCAAP is the single largest producer of small arms ammunition for the United States Armed Forces.

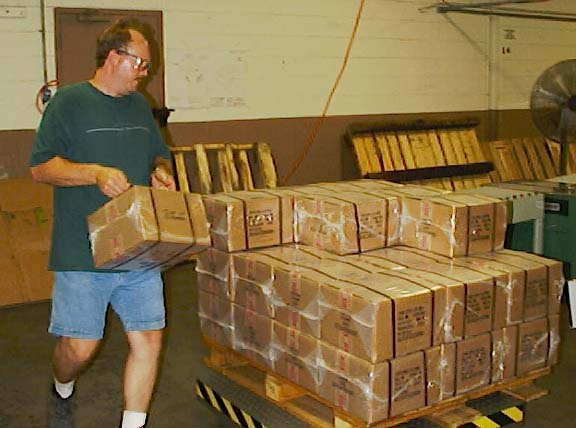
Finished outer boxes of the commercial pack, each containing 1,800 rounds, are palletized before the entire pallet is shrink-wrapped for shipment.

== Capabilities ==
The manufacturing capabilities of the plant include: cartridges; components such as percussion and electric primers; pyrotechnics; and small caliber ammunition (5.56 mm; 7.62 mm; .50BMG; and 20 mm).

The plant also performs reliability testing on small caliber ammunition (5.56×45; 7.62×51; 9 mm, .45ACP; and .50BMG) and demilitarization and disposal of small caliber ammunition and explosives.

== History ==
LCAAP was established in December 1940 as the Lake City Arsenal, with production beginning in 1941. It was the first of 12 small arms plants run by the Army. The plant was built by Remington with assistance from DuPont.

Remington Arms operated the plant from its inception until 1985, when operations were taken over by the Olin Corporation. From April 2000, it was operated by Alliant Techsystems (ATK), later known as Orbital ATK after a 2015 merger between Orbital Sciences Corporation and parts of Alliant Techsystems. Orbital ATK was acquired by Northrop Grumman in 2018 and is now known as Northrop Grumman Innovation Systems. Starting in October 2020, Winchester Ammunition was selected by the US Army to operate and manage the Lake City Plant.

An accidental explosion in a primer manufacturing facility at the plant in April 2017 killed one worker and injured four others.

Between 2000 and 2018, Lake City produced more than 17 billion rounds of ammunition for the US military. Since the late 2000s, the plant has been required to maintain the capability to manufacture 1.6 billion rifle rounds per year. As provided in its US Army contract, they have done so by selling rounds commercially. As of 2023, commercial sales have numbered in the hundreds of millions of rounds per year since 2011. This total often outstripped the plant's military production by 2-to-1 margins.

== Facilities ==
LCAAP is housed on 3,935 acres (1,592 ha) with 375 buildings, 80 magazines, 25 warehouses and 14 igloos. Together they provide a storage capacity of 652,837 square feet (60,650.5 m^{2}).

== Hazardous waste contamination ==
Historically, LCAAP waste treatment and disposal occurred on-site and relied on unlined lagoons, landfills, and burn pits. The plant generated large quantities of potentially hazardous wastes and hazardous substances, including solvents, oils, greases, explosives, radionuclides, perchlorates, and heavy metals. As a result of the extensive contamination, the site was added to the United States Environmental Protection Agency's National Priorities List in 1987, and it remains a Superfund site.
