= Defense Ammunition Center (United States) =

Facility of the US Army Joint Munitions Command

The Defense Ammunition Center (DAC) is the United States Department of Defense’s focal point for ammunition knowledge and logistical support. It is responsible for explosives safety, logistics engineering, transportability, training, depot/garrison doctrine, demilitarization technology, supportability, reliability, technical assistance and career management. DAC also supports all aspects of ammunition operations and activities from development through disposal. The center is part of the US Army Joint Munitions Command.

== History ==
The US Army Defense Ammunition Center and School was established in 1920 and was located at Savanna Army Depot, in Savanna, Illinois. DAC developed the Army's oldest civilian career program, which became the Quality Assurance Specialist (Ammunition Surveillance) or QASAS. In 1971, the organization was officially named Department of the Army Materiel Development and Readiness Command Ammunition Center. In 1994, it became the Defense Ammunition Center. In 1998, DAC relocated from the Savanna Army Depot to the McAlester Army Ammunition Plant, in McAlester, Oklahoma under the 1995 Base Realignment and Closure decision.

== Facilities ==
DAC is housed in two buildings as a tenant at McAlester Army Ammunition Plant.
