= Economic potential =

Economic potential is the potential of a region, nation, or corporation for economic development and growth. Typically, discussions of economic potential occur when available resources have not yet been tapped and fully developed or exploited, possibly because of missing infrastructure.

The Dictionary of Military and Associated Terms (2005) defines economic potential as

"The total capacity of a nation to produce goods and services."

== Measurement ==
Economists measure economic potential through indicators such as potential output, labor productivity, and capacity utilization. Institutions such as the International Monetary Fund and the World Bank use structural models to estimate potential growth trends and the distance of an economy from its productive frontier.

== See also ==
- Productive capacity
- Potential output
- Production–possibility frontier
- Developing country
- Potential superpowers
