= Meldon D'Silva =

Indian footballer

Personal information
- Date of birth: 17 November 1994 (age 31)
- Place of birth: Benaulim, Goa, India
- Position: Centre-back

Youth career
- Mumbai
- Calangute Association

Senior career*
Years	Team	Apps	(Gls)
2014–2016	Mumbai		
2016	→ Dempo (loan)	0	(0)
2016–2018	Churchill Brothers	3	(0)
2018–2019	Goa B	16	(3)
2019–2023	Churchill Brothers	8	(0)

International career
2014	India U20	4	(1)
- * Club domestic league appearances and goals as of 21:44, 8 January 2023 (UTC)

Meldon D'Silva (born 17 November 1994) is an Indian professional footballer who plays as a defender.

== Career ==
Born in Benaulim, Goa, D'Silva began his career with Dempo and Salgaocar's youth teams before playing in the Goa Professional League with Wilfried Leisure. In October 2014, he signed with professional I-League side Mumbai. He stayed with the club for two seasons before returning to Goa to play with Calangute Association. After showing good displays in the Goa Professional League with Calangute, D'Silva signed on loan with his former club Dempo.

After the Goan football season finished, D'Silva signed with Churchill Brothers for the I-League. He made his professional debut for the club on 10 February 2017 against Aizawl. He started and played the full match but could not prevent the club from losing 3–1.

== International ==
In 2014, D'Silva represented the Goan–India team during the Lusophony Games. He scored the opening goal for Goa–India in the gold medal match against Mozambique as the Goan side won 3–2.

== Career statistics ==
=== Club ===
As of 8 January 2023

Club	Season	League			Cup		AFC		Total	
Club	Season	Division	Apps	Goals	Apps	Goals	Apps	Goals	Apps	Goals
Churchill Brothers	2016–17	I-League	3	0	0	0	—		3	0
Goa B	2017–18	I-League 2nd Division	10	1	0	0	—		10	1
Goa B	2018–19	I-League 2nd Division	6	2	0	0	—		6	2
Goa B	Total		16	3	0	0	0	0	16	3
Churchill Brothers	2021–22	I-League	6	0	0	0	—		6	0
Churchill Brothers	2022–23	I-League	2	0	0	0	—		2	0
Churchill Brothers	Total		8	0	0	0	0	0	8	0
Career total			27	3	0	0	0	0	27	3

== Honour ==
India U20 (Goa India)

- Lusofonia Games Gold medal: 2014
