= Letterkenny Munitions Center =

Facility of the US Army Joint Munitions Command

Coordinates: 39.994°N 77.653°W

LEMC technicians perform software upgrades on a Missile Common Test Device

Letterkenny Munitions Center, located on Letterkenny Army Depot in Franklin County, Pennsylvania, is a satellite activity under Crane Army Ammunition Activity in Crane, Indiana. The center maintains, stores, and demilitarizes tactical missiles and conventional ammunition for the Army, Air Force, and Navy. LEMC assembles, disassembles, and tests missiles and missile sections. It is also responsible for every aspect of conventional ammunition and missiles, including demilitarization, renovation and X-ray. The facility is part of the US Army Joint Munitions Command.

== Capabilities ==
The capabilities of the center include: logistics support; storage; non-destructive testing; missile maintenance; munitions maintenance and renovation; and demilitarization.

== History ==
Letterkenny Army Depot was established in 1941 as an ammunition and general supply storage depot. In 1961, its Directorate of Ammunition Operations began supporting Army air defense missiles and Air Force intercept missiles. In 1991, the Directorate of Ammunition Operations was renamed Letterkenny Munitions Center with command and control transferred to Crane Army Ammunition Activity. LEMC is a tenant at Letterkenny Army Depot.

== Facilities ==
LEMC occupies 16,000 of Letterkenny’s 17,400 acres (70 km^{2}). Its facilities include 13 buildings, 2,300,000 square feet (210,000 m^{2}) of explosive storage space, 902 igloos, 26 rail docks, 28 miles (45 km) of railroad, 126 miles (203 km) of paved road, and a containerization facility.

== Environment ==
Letterkenny was placed on the Environmental Protection Agency’s National Priority List (Superfund) in 1987.

- Information compiled from
