= Naval Surface Warfare Center Crane Division =

Division of the U.S. Naval Surface Warfare Center

Coordinates: 38.8701°N 86.8344°W

- NSWC Crane Emblem
- Active: 1941 – present
- Country: United States
- Branch: United States Navy
- Garrison/HQ: Crane, Indiana
- Motto: "I Work at Crane With Pride.”

Commanders
- Current commander: Captain Rex Boonyobhas

Naval Surface Warfare Center Crane Division (NSWC Crane Division) is the principal tenant command located at Naval Support Activity Crane (NSA Crane) in Indiana.

NSA Crane is a United States Navy installation located approximately 25 miles (40 km) southwest of Bloomington, Indiana, and predominantly located in Martin County, but small parts also extend into Greene and Lawrence counties. It was originally established in 1941 under the Bureau of Ordnance as the Naval Ammunition Depot for the production, testing, and storage of ordnance under the first supplemental Defense Appropriation Act. The base is named after William M. Crane. The base is the third largest naval installation in the world by geographic area and employs approximately 3,300 people. The closest community is the small town of Crane, which lies adjacent to the northwest corner of the facility.

== Operations ==
With an increasing demand in the 1990s and 2000s by the US military for bases to support multiple functions rather than being sole-purpose installations, NSA Crane has taken on a broad variety of development and support operations. These include expeditionary warfare systems, fleet maintenance, and modernization, radar, power systems, strategic systems, small arms, surface and airborne electronic warfare, night vision systems, and undersea warfare systems. NSA Crane is also involved in systems development for the upcoming DD(X) class of destroyer for the U.S. Navy and the current littoral combat ship (LCS).

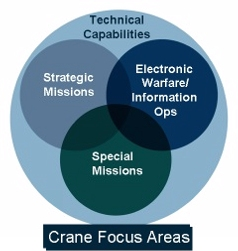
Diagram showing Crane focus areas

Operations at NSWC Crane are divided into three distinct focus areas: Strategic Missions, Electronic Warfare, and Expeditionary Warfare.

== Strategic missions ==
"Deter – Defend – Defeat"

The Strategic Missions Focus Area encompasses the full range of DoD activities that alter an adversary's will and ability to attack the United States and its interests.

Critical Infrastructure Protection

NSWC Crane is the acquisition engineering & technical support agent for the Navy's Strategic Programs Office for the fielding of the Integrated Nuclear Weapons Security System.

Full Spectrum Radar Engineering Support

NSWC Crane provides a broad range of systems engineering expertise for the sustainment and modernization of the Air Forces Ballistic Missile Early Warning Systems.

Flight Systems

NSWC Crane supports systems engineering design, analysis, test, and evaluation of flight systems for strategic platforms.

Launcher Systems

NSWC Crane provides product and subsystem engineering and logistics to the Navy's Strategic Systems Programs Strategic Weapons System and Attack Weapon Control System.

Modeling and Simulation

The Flight Systems Division (Code GXM) models and simulates electronic components and subsystems of the Navy's Strategic Weapons System including the Attack Weapon Control System and Counter Measurement System. Analyses include Signal Processing, Signal Integrity (SI), and Electromagnetic Compatibility/Electromagnetic Interference (EMC/EMI) using Signal Modeling and Simulation (M&S) techniques, Circuit M&S techniques, and Method of Moments (MoM). Particular signal M&S tools include Matlab/Simulink and particular circuit M&S and MoM tools include Agilent Technologies Advanced Design System (ADS) with Agilent Momentum.

The Platform and Launch Systems Division (Code GXP) models and simulates:

1. Components and subsystems of the Submarine, Launch Tube, and Missile including missile Launch Test Vehicle (LTV), Ballast Transport Fixtures, and Hydrophones. Analyses include Stress, Thermal, Modal, and Acoustic using Finite Element Method (FEM). Particular FEM analysis tools include ANSYS and ABAQUS.
2. Components and subsystems of the Common Missile Compartment (CMC) involving Missile Heating and Cooling (MHC) and Underwater Launch (UWL). Analyses include Computational Fluid Dynamics (CFD) using Finite Volume Method (FVM) and FEM. Particular CFD tools include ANSYS Fluent and ABAQUS CFD.
3. Electronic systems and subsystems of the Platform and Launch Tube. Analyses include Electromagnetic Compatibility/Electromagnetic Interference (EMC/EMI) using Circuit Modeling and Simulation (M&S) techniques and coupled Boundary Element Method and Finite Element Method (BEM/FEM). Particular circuit M&S tools and BEM/FEM tools include ANSOFT Simplorer and ANSOFT Q3D Extractor.

The Technology and Infrastructure Protection Division's Strategic Test and Validation Systems Branch Code GXQP models and simulates Strategic Weapon Systems Coordination. Analyses are performed for requirements verification using Matlab/Simulink.

The Radar Systems Engineering Division (Code GXR) models and simulates:

1. Electronic components and subsystems of Microwave and Radar equipment. Analyses include Electromagnetic Compatibility/Electromagnetic Interference (EMC/EMI) and Signal Integrity (SI) using Circuit Modeling and Simulation (M&S) techniques and Method of Moments (MoM). Particular circuit M&S and MoM tools include Agilent Technologies Advanced Design System (ADS) with Agilent Momentum.
2. Electron Guns inside Microwave Tubes. Analyses include calculation of Electric Potential and Electric Field using Finite Element Method (FEM). Particular FEM analysis tools include ANSOFT Maxell 2-D and 3-D steady state and transient electromagnetic fields solver.
3. Waveguides and Antennas. Analyses include the determination of antenna patterns/performance using FEM and Method of Moments (MoM). Particular FEM and MoM analysis tools include ANSOFT HFSS, Agilent EMPro, FEKO, and CST Microwave Studio.

== Electronic warfare ==
"Control the Spectrum – Control the Fight"

Electronic Warfare supports any military action using electromagnetic energy to control the electromagnetic spectrum or attack an adversary

Development

NSWC Crane develops and manufactures all of the infrared countermeasures used on US Navy aircraft

Test and Evaluation

NSWC Crane developed and operates the only COMOPTEVFOR certified test facilities to support EW T&E events such as Developmental Tests, Operational assessments, and Operational Tests

Sustainment

NSWC Crane is the only DOD Engineering, Logistics, and Maintenance Capability for Air, Ground, Surface, and Submarine EW Systems within one Facility

Training

NSWC Crane is helping the Army to improve their capabilities of countering improvised explosive devices (IED).

Modeling and Simulation

The Expeditionary Electronic Warfare Division models and simulates: Counter Radio Controlled IED Electronics Warfare (CREW) systems; radio control trigger devices for IEDs; and, the RF prorogation paths involved in the engagement and defeat of RCIEDS, allowing former field tests to be run in a controlled laboratory environment.

The IR/RF Systems Technologies Division's Navy Infrared Countermeasures Effectiveness Laboratory (NICEL) models and simulates threat IR missile vs. aircraft engagements to support aircraft countermeasure development.

The Maritime Electronic Warfare Systems Division models a systems engineering sustainment system that automates Electronic Warfare (EW) Systems sustainment activities. The model is created using the IBM Rational Rhapsody tool using the SysML modeling language and DoD Application Framework (DoDAF). The sustainment model implements life-cycle activities including logistics delays based on real or proposed replacement part reliabilities, quantities, and locations, along with workflows and processes to support a performance-based sustainment (PBS) solution for Electronic Warfare Systems. Using SysML and DoDAF, the interactions between Crane employees, automated tools, the Electronic Warfare systems, and data to accomplish PBS are simulated.

The Maritime Electronic Warfare Systems Division provides modeling and simulation for shipboard Electronic Warfare (EW) Systems. Scenarios have been constructed to characterize the effects of various threats on EW systems and to develop technology for increasing system performance. Antenna patterns measured in the anechoic environment are used to both enhance models and validate simulations.

== Expeditionary warfare ==
"Rapid Response – Proven Solutions"

Special Missions supports military forces engaged in Special Operations, Irregular Warfare and Riverine Operations

Mobility and Maneuverability

NSWC Crane designed, built, and fielded the first Counter-Sniper Enclosure for USAF Force Protection HMMWVs in six weeks

Special Munitions and Weapons

NSWC Crane is U.S. Special Operations Command's (USSOCOM) program manager for the development, acquisition, fielding, and sustainment of the SOF Combat Assault Rifle (SCAR)

Sensors and Communications

SOPMOD has surged more than $60 million in ground combat end items to Special Operations Forces (SOF) in the field during Operation Enduring Freedom and Operation Iraqi Freedom

Training

NSWC Crane provided small arms operations & maintenance training to over 500 personnel in FY06

Modeling and Simulation

Special Missions Human Systems Integration activity uses Concept Modeling tools to analyze gunner tasks to provide improved training and testing methods.

The Small Arms Weapons Systems Division utilizes a weapon shock simulator to augment live-fire on weapon accessories and other weapon-mounted electronics to ensure proper survivability. Measured shock profiles from actual weapons are used with the simulator to test the survivability of batteries, electrical connections, and optical components. This division also uses a six-axis platform that simulates sea states for testing auto tracker software. The Electro-Optic Technology Division uses modeling tools in a number of applications. Examples include using a variety of commercially available tools to do the following:

- evaluate the performance of Infrared systems, to accurately predict atmospheric effects on specific optical/electromagnetic wavelengths
- predict turbulence effects on optical transmission and imaging at different altitudes
- simulate a realistic system-level minimum resolvable temperature difference (MRTD) test result
- model laser beam propagation through the atmosphere over the distance to a target
- calculate spatial frequencies based upon range, scene, and sensor
- predict electro-optical sensors and I2 tubes Minimum Resolvable Contrast (MRC)
- predict the Contrast Threshold Function (CTF) of a human interacting with an imaging system in order to predict task range performance
- predict an imaging system modulation transfer function (MTF)
- predict electrooptical weapon and navigation systems performance
- model laser-based active imager performance
- predict mission effectiveness versus sensor system versus environmental conditions
- use Concept Modeling tools to analyze warfighter tasks to provide improved sensors, interfaces, communications, and testing methods

Additional modeling capabilities within the Special Missions Focus Area use common modeling tools (i.e., Finite Element Analysis, MATLAB, COMSOL, etc.) as well as tools developed within the government to better understand electrooptic phenomena, warfighter technology applications, benefits, and trade spaces of new technologies, etc.

== History ==
In the late 1940s, an ammunition quality evaluation unit was added by the Bureau of Ordnance to expand its quality control system. As the complexity and sophistication of weapons increased in the 1950s and 1960s, Crane's activities, capabilities, and expertise expanded in scope under the newly formed Bureau of Weapons to include small arms, sonobuoy surveillance, microwave tubes, Polaris missiles, and other scientific and engineering support to the Bureau.

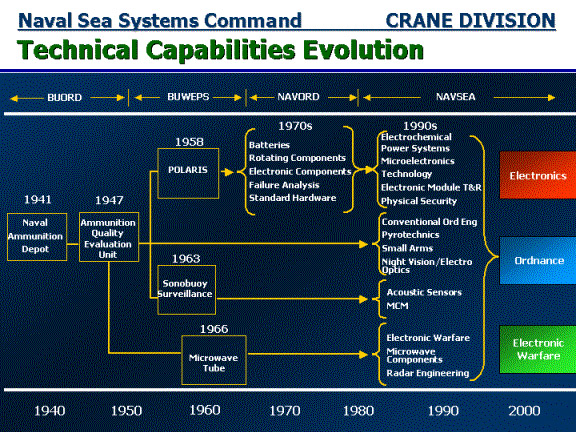
Chart showing the evolution of technical capabilities over time at Crane

In the 1960s, NSWC Crane came under the command of the newly established Naval Ordnance Systems Command and began providing technical support for weapons systems including logistics, in-service engineering, repair, overhaul, and design. In the 1970s, NSWC Crane's support began to include batteries, rotating components, electronic components, failure analysis, and standard hardware and new technologies related to night vision systems.

In 1974, NSWC Crane came under the Naval Sea Systems Command that was established from the merger of the Naval Ordnance Systems Command and Naval Ship Systems Command. Shortly after in 1975, Crane's name was changed to the Naval Weapons Support Center which more accurately reflected the true function of the installation.

In 1977, a major change occurred with the designation of the United States Army as the single-service manager of conventional ammunition. This resulted in the establishment of the tenant command, Crane Army Ammunition Activity (CAAA), which took over the loading, assembly, and storage of ammunition at the installation. CAAA and NSWC Crane's strong partnership continues today.

In 1992, NSWC Crane's name was changed to the Crane Division, Naval Surface Warfare Center when the warfare centers were established under the related systems commands. The Crane Division has grown over time and has produced a variety of technical product lines.

In 2005, the Base Realignment and Closure Commission recommended to retain most existing operations at NSA Crane, with weapons and armaments research, development and acquisition, and test and evaluation, but moving gun/ammunition, combat system security, and energetic materials to Naval Air Weapons Station China Lake, California. This BRAC change resulted in a net loss of 672 civilian jobs from the base.

== NSA Crane tenants ==
Naval Support Activity Crane hosts a number of different commands and divisions. These are:

- Naval Surface Warfare Center Crane Division
- Crane Army Ammunition Activity provides munitions and energetics storage and distribution, and first strike and war reserve ordnance support for the United States Department of Defense.
- Great Lakes Industrial Hygiene
- Defense Automated Printing Service
- Naval Criminal Investigative Service
- Defense Commissary Agency Detachment Crane
- Navy Exchange
- Defense Logistics Agency Disposition Services activity of the Defense Logistics Agency
- Resident Officer in Charge of Construction (ROICC)
- Explosive Ordnance Disposal
- United States Coast Guard
- United States Army Reserve
- Joint Test and Assessment Activity
- Joint Innovation and Technology Transition Center

== Geography ==
The base is the third largest naval installation in the world, comprising approximately 280 square kilometers (110 sq mi) of territory. Lake Greenwood, a 320-hectare (790-acre) lake, is entirely encompassed by the base. White oak wood for reconstruction of USS Constitution is harvested at this base from a grove of trees known as "Constitution Grove".

== See also ==
- Naval Surface Warfare Center
- Time in Indiana
