= Scranton Army Ammunition Plant =

Facility of the US Army Joint Munitions Command

- near Scranton and Dickson City, Pennsylvania in United States
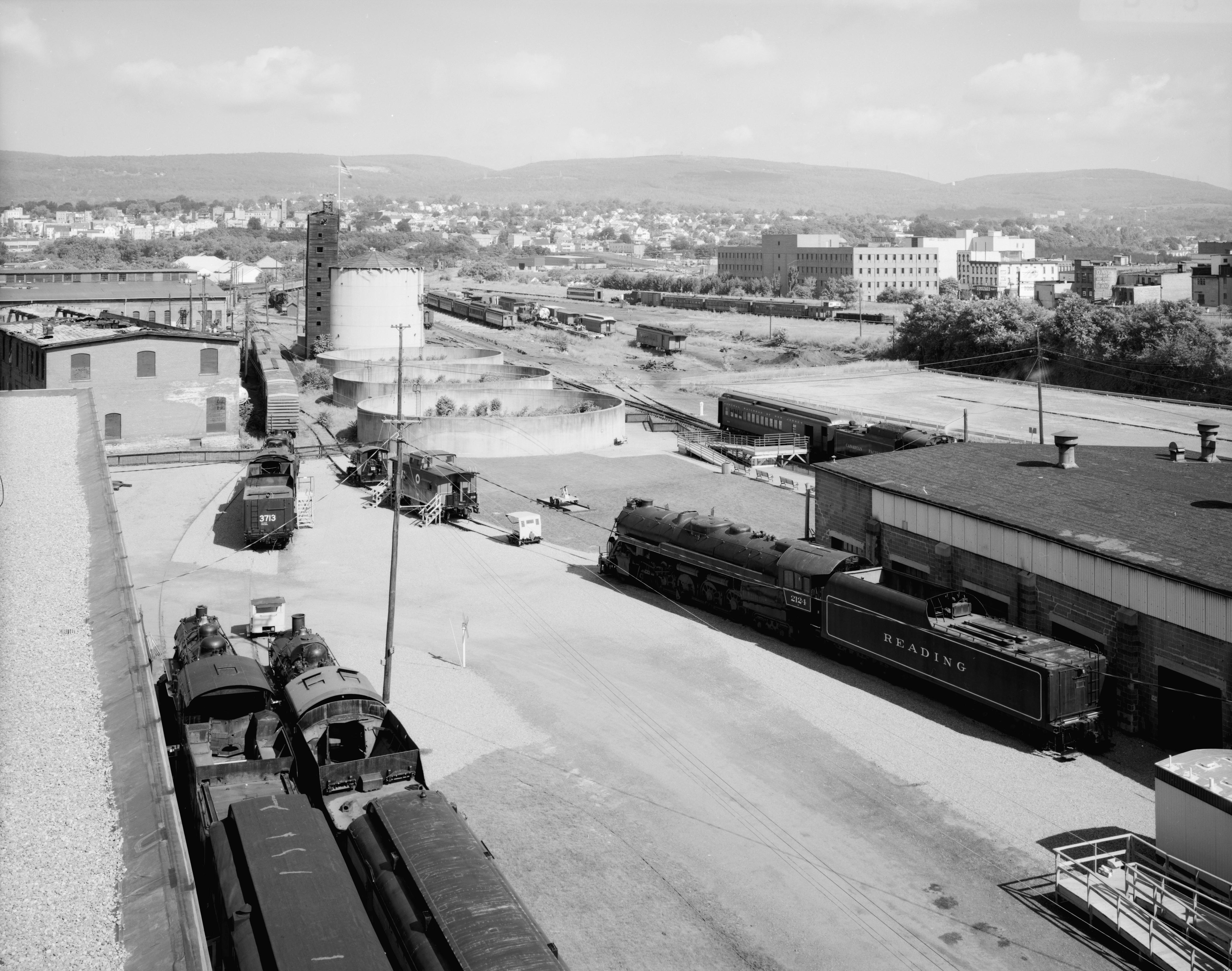
- SCAAP is located within The Delaware, Lackawanna and Western Railroad Yard-Dickson Manufacturing Co., 1989

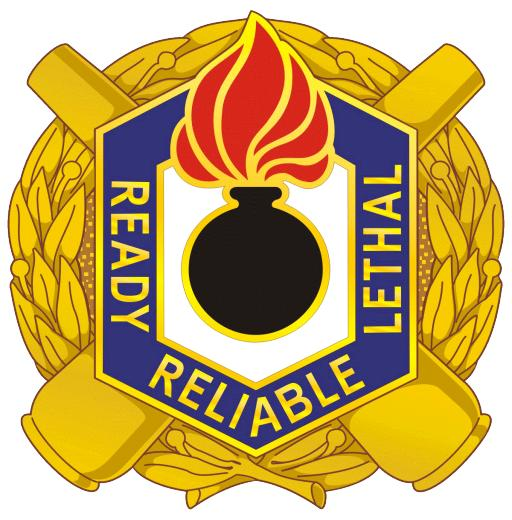
- Crest of Joint Munitions Command

Site information
- Type: Ammunition production facility (155mm, 105mm Artillery)
- Code: SCAAP
- Owner: United States Army
- Operator: General Dynamics-Ordnance and Tactical Systems (GD-OTS)
- Controlled by: Joint Munitions Command

Location
- Location of Scranton Army Ammunition Plant Scranton Army Ammunition Plant (SCAAP) (the United States)
- Coordinates: 41°24′15″N 75°39′58″W
- Area: 15.3 acres (6.2 ha)

The Scranton Army Ammunition Plant (SCAAP) is a United States Army Joint Munitions Command (JMC) facility that manufactures large-caliber metal projectiles and mortar projectiles for the Department of Defense.

== Capabilities ==
Capabilities of the plant to manufacture ammunition metal parts, and artillery and mortar rounds include forging, machining, heat-treating, welding, phosphating and painting, finishing, and destructive and non-destructive testing.

Some of the projectiles produced by SCAAP are 155 mm and 105 mm artillery projectiles, including the 155 mm M795 and M107, and the 105 mm PGU-45/B High Fragmentation (HF) cartridge for the Air Force's AC-130 gunship; 120 mm mortar (M120/M121) projectiles, M931 Full Range Training Cartridge (FRTC), M933 and M934 high-explosive (HE), M930 and M983 illumination, M929 white phosphorus (WP) smoke; and the 5"/54 (5-inch) naval gun projectile.

SCAAP can also produce 8-inch (203 mm) and 175 mm artillery shells like those used in the M110 howitzer and the M107 self-propelled gun which have been retired by the United States, but are used by some other nations, including some allied to the United States, including Taiwan.

== History ==
The installation that SCAAP sits on was originally made in 1908 as a steam locomotive erecting and repair facility. SCAAP was there in 1953 and operated by U.S. Hoffman. In 1963 Chamberlain Manufacturing became the operating contractor. In 2006 facility operation was assumed by General Dynamics, Ordnance and Tactical Systems from Chamberlain, and remains the current operating contractor. Selected buildings at the plant are included in the Delaware, Lackawanna and Western Railroad Yard-Dickson Manufacturing Co. Site and added to the National Register of Historic Places in 1990.

Before the Russo-Ukrainian war, SCAAP produced approximately 14,000 artillery shells per month. Since then, production has increased significantly. As of September 2024, the monthly production rate has reached 36,000 shells. Ukraine is currently receiving approximately 90,000 artillery shells per month from various sources, including the United States.

=== Awards ===
In 2007 SCAAP were the recipient of the Army Materiel Command (AMC)) Superior Unit Award with many of the other Army Ammunition Plants and Ammunition Depots. In 2012 SCAAP Received a second AMC Superior Unit Award.

SCAAP was awarded the 2011 Secretary of the Army Environmental Award for Sustainability - Industrial Installation, being the only JMC installation to receive the award. The award recognises efforts in environmental science and sustainability, as the highest honor in this field conferred by the United States Army, by pledging to reduced energy consumption by 25% over the next ten years, with SCAAP having already decreased electricity and gas consumption by 18.4% than compared to FY2010, as well as capturing, and reusing over 3,100,000 U.S. gal (12,000,000 L; 12,000 m^{3}) equating to a reduction in water consumption of 37%, through the period FY2011-2012; reducing greenhouse gas emissions and pollution; and, material substitution and replacement to reduce zinc phosphate in its production.

In 2016 SCAAP was awarded with the Better Plants Goal Achievement Award by the U.S. Department of Energy for achieving their energy reduction goal, set in 2011; SCAAP had pledged to reduce its energy consumption by 25% over the next ten years. In early 2016 SCAAP exceeded that goal having achieved a reduction of 32% from their 2009 baseline year.

== Facilities ==
SCAAP is housed on 15.3 acres (6.2 ha) with seven buildings and storage capacity of 495,000 square feet (46,000 m^{2}).

The SCAAP facilities have a number of key forging and machining capabilities including:

- Nine 155mm M795 Rotating band welders
- 5 Forge Presses (3 Gas-fired Rotary Hearth Furnaces, and 3 Electric Induction Furnaces)
- 4 Nosing Presses
- 5 Heat Treat Furnace Systems (Including Small Batch)
- 120+ Hydraulic Tracer and Computer Numerical Control (CNC) Lathes
- 2 Automated Coating Lines (Zinc Phosphate and ID/OD Prime and Paint)

SCAAP has surge capacity that can allow it to increase production volume and capacity at short notice if or when the need arises, with a listed capacity of 1,000,000 metal products. Some of this surge capability was activated in 2022 due to the demands of the Russo-Ukrainian War.

== Accreditation and Certification ==
Scranton Army Ammunition Plant has the following accreditations and certifications:

- ISO 9001 (since 1997)
- ISO 14001:2015 - Environmental management systems
- ISO 50001:20011(e)/ANSI/MSE 50021 Energy Management Systems and Superior Energy Performance (SEP)
  - In January 2013 SCAAP successfully passed a four day ANSI/MSE 50021 certification audit
