= Copolyester =

Polyester made of 2 or more different monomers

A copolyester is a copolymer synthesized by modification of polyesters, which are combinations of diacids and diols. For example, by introducing other diacids, such as isophthalic acid (IPA), or other diols, such as cyclohexane dimethanol (CHDM) to the polyester polyethylene terephthalate (PET), the material becomes a copolyester due to its comonomer content.

Copolyesters retain their strength, clarity, and other mechanical properties even when exposed to a variety of chemicals that typically affect other materials, such as polycarbonates. This, plus their versatility and flexibility, allows manufacturers to use them effectively in the design of both high-volume, low-cost parts as well as critical, more expensive component parts.

== Applications ==
Copolyesters offer versatility to meet a wide variety of applications. Copolyester resins have proved to be effective in packaging applications, due to their toughness, versatility and chemical resistance. They are also frequently used in the manufacture and packaging of consumer goods and materials. Markets that rely on copolyesters include medical packaging, home appliances, consumer goods (pens, toys, sporting goods, etc.), and cosmetics, among others. As a filament it is used in the 3D printing industry.

Table of Common Copolyester and Components

Polyester / Copolyester	Diacid (s)	Diol (s)	Properties
PET	Terephthalic acid (TPA)	Ethylene glycol (EG)	
PCTG	TPA	Cyclohexanedimethanol (CHDM)+EG	
PCTA	TPA + isophthalic acid (IPA)	CHDM	
PETG	TPA	CHDM+EG	
PCT	TPA	CHDM	

== Manufacturers ==
The main global manufacturers and suppliers of Copolyester resins are as follows (The brand names are in parentheses):

- Eastman Chemical Company – (Eastar, Provista, Tritan)
- Bostik Findley – (Vitel)
- Toyobo – (Vylon)
- Evonik – (Dynacoll S)
- SKChemical – (Skygreen, Ecozen, Skybon)
- Henkel – (Petaflex)
- Covestro (formerly Bayer MaterialScience AG) – (Vivak/ PETg)
- Macroocean – (Marcoa, Marnex)
- EMS CHEMIE - (Griltex)

== See also ==
- Polyester
