= Delaware, Lackawanna and Western Railroad Yard-Dickson Manufacturing Co. Site =

Historic district in Pennsylvania, United States

- U.S. National Register of Historic Places
- U.S. Historic district
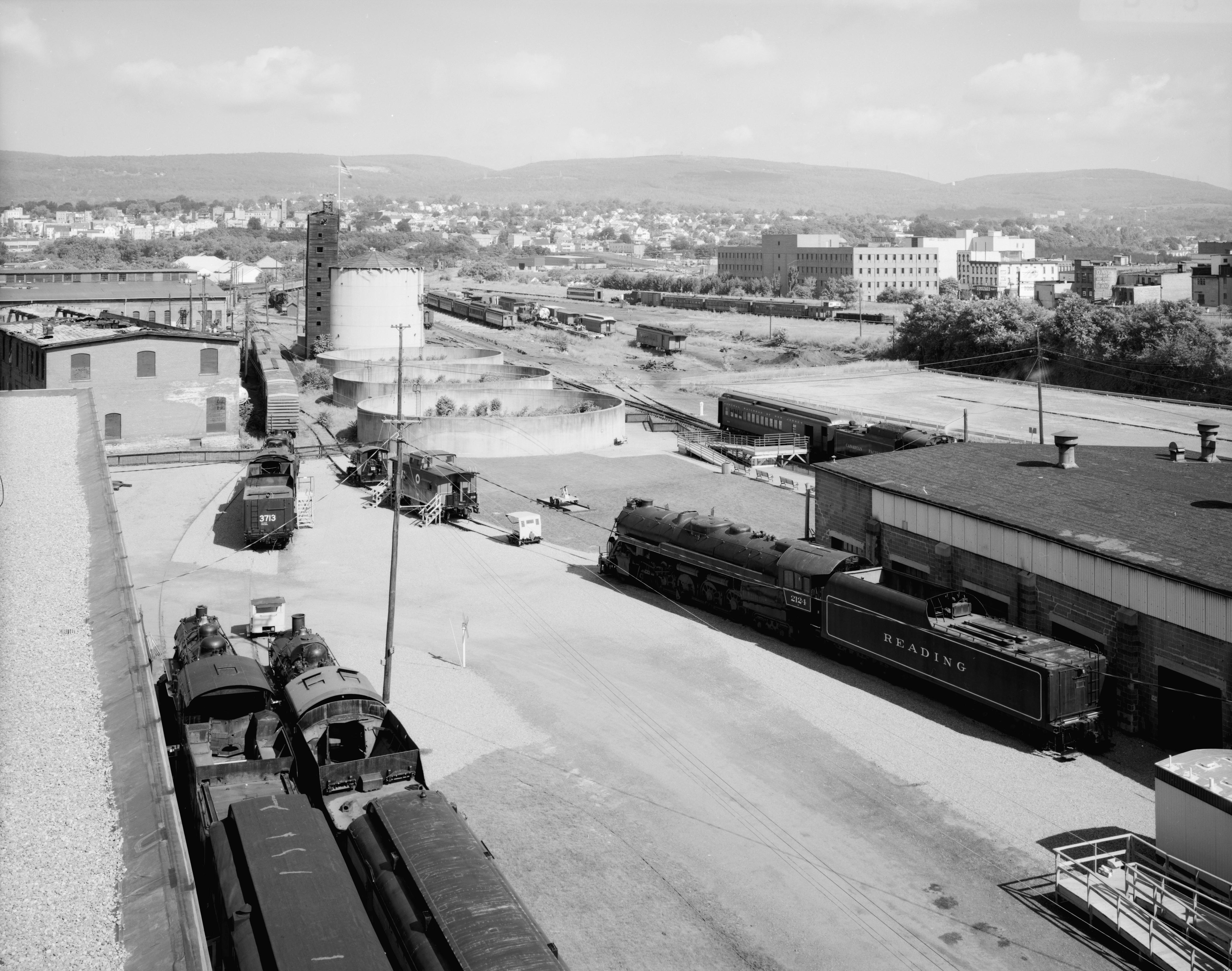
- Delaware, Lackawanna and Western Railroad Yard, 1989

- Location within Pennsylvania Location within the United States
- Location: Roughly bounded by Cliff St., Lackawanna Ave., Mattes Ave., River St. & the Lackawanna R., Scranton, Pennsylvania
- Coordinates: 41°24′23″N 75°40′09″W
- Area: 78 acres (32 ha)
- Architect: Frank J. Nies
- Architectural style: Utilitarian
- NRHP reference No.: 90001739
- Added to NRHP: November 21, 1990

Delaware, Lackawanna and Western Railroad Yard-Dickson Manufacturing Co. Site is a national historic district located in Scranton, Lackawanna County, Pennsylvania. It encompasses the Steamtown National Historic Site and Scranton Army Ammunition Plant and includes 16 contributing buildings, four contributing sites, and five contributing structures. The yard includes buildings and structures related to the yard's expansion in 1899–1939, and its usage as steam locomotive maintenance complex. The Dickson Manufacturing Company built steam locomotives, and the site of its works are included in this district.

Notable buildings at the Steamtown National Historic Site include the following:

- Gas House (1909)
- Office and Storage Building (1909)
- Green Sands Storage Bin and Dryer (1917)
- Oil House (1912)
- Maintenance Shop (1865–1949)
- Roundhouse Office and Storeroom (1902)
- Roundhouse remnants (1902, 1937)
- Mattes Street Signal Tower (1908) and Warehouse (1876, 1901, 1926).

Notable buildings at the Scranton Army Ammunition Plant include the following:

- Pattern Shop/Office Building (1907–1909)
- Foundry/Forge Shop (1907–1909)
- Blacksmith Shop/Heat Treat Building (1907–1909)
- Machine and Erecting Shop/Production Shop (1907–1909).

It was added to the National Register of Historic Places in 1990.
