= Productive capacity =

Productive capacity is the maximum possible output of an economy. According to the United Nations Conference on Trade and Development (UNCTAD), no agreed-upon definition of maximum output exists. UNCTAD itself proposes: "the productive resources, entrepreneurial capabilities and production linkages which together determine the capacity of a country to produce goods and services." The term may also be applied to individual resources or assets; for instance the productive capacity of an area of farmland.

== Definition in more depth ==
Productive capacity has a lot in common with a production possibility frontier (PPF) that is an answer to the question what the maximum production capacity of a certain economy is which means using as many economy's resources to make the output as possible. In a standard PPF graph, two types of goods’ quantities are set. PPF expresses all the possibilities of a combination of these goods that can be maximally produced by a certain economy due to its scarce resources and creates a downward-sloping line. When a certain body reaches any point under the line, the body's production is under productive potential. When the body's combination of the two goods included in the graph reaches a point which stands on the PPF line, the body is at its maximum productivity, which creates the highest efficiency on the body. Any other situation cannot be reached because the line gives a limit to the goods’ production that is not possible to be exceeded. In the case of a productive capacity graph, on the horizontal line are defined capital goods and on the vertical line, consumer goods are stated. The functioning of the productive capacity graph is the same as for the above-mentioned PPF graph. The only possible outputs are those that lie under and on the PPF line. If an economy suffers from an under-production, thus an output point can be located under the productive potential, the economy loses its maximum potential output and spare capacity is created. That equals to the fact that the economy has a lower GDP than is possible. An economy employing all the economically active people and all the resources efficiently produces on its PPF line, therefore has the biggest GDP as possible.

== Strengthening productive capacity ==
The process of heightening productive capacity can be related to many reasons, such as:

1. Quantity of labour – The most crucial factor is how wide and how qualified is the range of an economy's labour. With more economically active people, low unemployment and a high level of human capital, the economy is more able to move its PPF to the right.
2. Labour's productivity – Closely related to education, motivation, the efficiency of work etc. People who achieve internal motivation accomplish work-related activities more than people who are bored with their work. With more effective labour, a nation has bigger potential to do their best, thus has higher output because of a positive impact on labour productivity that increases its efficiency, hence the growth of the GDP.
3. Size of capital – The number of financial resources. It includes financial assets, enterprises, machines, patents or technologies that can be used by labour in a production process. It is always good to distinguish between spending or investing that because investing capital is often related to heightening the capital. Due to this fact, enterprises, states or even the whole society could be better off.
4. Entrepreneur potential – Immeasurable potential of people in a certain state to innovate, take risks or establish new enterprises. With more entrepreneurs, there will be a more significant competition that can lead to equilibrium. Without entrepreneurs, states do not have much potential to move their productive capacity to the right.
5. Political stability – In states that are affected by armed conflict, struggle for power, mafia etc., the investment inflow is not as high as it could be without all the above-mentioned issues. Enterprises that want to extend their production to other countries often choose the states that have high political stability because they do not want to risk. The fact that direct investment from a foreign nation predominantly brings many advantages for a state that is invested in is widely known. Some of these advantages could be technology innovations, jobs creation, improving relationships between the states included in the process and many others.

== Productive capacity of the world's Least Developed Countries (LDC) ==
All of the above-mentioned statements that could be applied to raise productive capacity apply to LDC as well. Investment in human or financial capital, providing better education, innovations or raising entrepreneurs – all of these have to be implemented especially in these countries. Although, because of its specific starting position, there are several additional recommendations to succeed in the productive capacity heightening process:

1. Enhancing the environment of a country – Quality of infrastructure, transport, or telecommunication services must be improved to entice investors from foreign countries. Without investing in the environment, states’ chances to manage an inflow of investors approach zero.
2. Improvement of power supply – Today, most of the places is dependent on electricity. Without a proper power supply, no investors will come due to electricity required to realise the investments and many other reasons.
3. Building social infrastructure – Social infrastructure consists of buildings that provide people education, health, banking, etc. All of these are as crucial as the above-mentioned ones – LDC that want to be successful in enhancing their country must improve all of the statements together because they are closely related to inflowing foreign investors.

== See also ==
- Capacity utilization
- Economic potential
- Production assurance
