= Eastman Chemical Company =

American chemicals company

- Type: Public
- Traded as: NYSE: EMN; S&P 600 component
- Industry: Manufacturing
- Founded: 1920; 106 years ago
- Founder: George Eastman
- Headquarters: Kingsport, Tennessee, U.S.
- Area served: Worldwide
- Key people: Mark J. Costa (CEO)
- Products: Chemicals; Fibers; Plastics
- Revenue: ▼US$8.75 billion (2025)
- Net income: ▼US$474 million (2025)
- Number of employees: 14,000 (2024)
- Website: eastman.com

Eastman Chemical Company is an American chemical products manufacturer based in Kingsport, Tennessee. Founded in 1920, it was a subsidiary of Kodak until 1994. The company is an independent global specialty materials company that produces a broad range of advanced materials, chemicals and fibers for everyday purposes. It operates 36 manufacturing sites worldwide and employs approximately 14,000 people. In 2023, Eastman had sales revenue of approximately $9.21 billion.

== Business segments ==
Eastman manufactures and markets chemicals, fibers, and plastics. It provides coatings, adhesives and specialty plastics products, is a major supplier of cellulose acetate fibers, and produces copolyesters for packaging.

The company's products and operations are managed and reported in four operating segments: Additives & Functional Products, Advanced Materials, Chemical Intermediates, and Fibers.

Additives & Functional Products

In this segment, Eastman manufactures chemicals and adhesive resins for products in the coatings and tires industries in transportation, building and construction, durable goods, health and wellness, and consumables markets. The development of cyanoacrylates ("super-glues", or instant adhesives) is attributed to Harry Coover, an employee of Eastman. The adhesives were patented in 1956.

Advanced Materials

In this segment, Eastman produces and markets specialty copolyesters, cellulose esters, interlayers, and aftermarket window film products for use in transportation, consumables, building and construction, durable goods, health and wellness, and electronics.

Chemical Intermediates

The Chemical Intermediates segment leverages large scale and vertical integration from the acetyl, olefins, and alkylamine streams and proprietary manufacturing technology for specialty fluids to manufacture diversified products that are sold externally for use in markets such as industrial chemicals and processing; building and construction; health and wellness; energy, fuels, and water; consumables; agriculture, as well as used internally by other Eastman segments.

Fibers

In the Fibers segment, Eastman manufactures and sells Estron acetate tow and Estrobond triacetin plasticizers for use primarily in the manufacture of cigarette filters; Estron natural and Chromspun solution-dyed acetate yarns for use in apparel, home furnishings and industrial fabrics; and cellulose acetate flake and acetyl raw materials for other acetate fiber producers.

== History ==
=== Founding as a subsidiary (1920–1994) ===
An effect of World War I was a scarcity in raw materials such as photographic paper, optical glass, gelatin and many chemicals, including methanol, acetic acid and acetone. After the war ended, George Eastman, founder of Eastman Kodak, began working to develop an independent supply of chemicals for his company's photographic processes. His search for suitable quantities of methanol and acetone led him to the southern United States.

In 1920, George Eastman founded Tennessee Eastman with two major platforms: organic chemicals and acetyls. Products such as calcium acetate, sodium acetate, acetic acid, and acetic anhydride were key. During World War II, RDX, a powerful explosive, was manufactured for the U.S. government at Holston Ordnance Works at Tennessee Eastman sites. At the peak of production near the end of the war, the plant was producing a million and a half pounds of explosives each day. Tennessee Eastman was responsible for managing the Y-12 National Security Complex at Oak Ridge, Tennessee, which produced enriched uranium for the Manhattan Project, from 1943 to May 1947.

In 1960, there was an explosion in the Kingsport plant's aniline production, which killed 16 people and injured many more. In 1983, Eastman opened the first commercial coal gasification facility in the United States at its Kingsport plant site to produce chemicals from syngas rather than petroleum. The "Chemicals from Coal Facility" at the Kingsport plant was recognized in 1995 as a National Historic Chemical Landmark by the American Chemical Society.

=== Independent company (1994–present) ===
In 1994, the Eastman Chemical Company was spun off from Eastman Kodak and became an independent corporation. In early 2005, Eastman broke ground on the first world-scale manufacturing facility using IntegRex, a technology that reduces the number of intermediate process steps in producing PET resin. This technology is now owned by DAK Americas.

Since 2000, Eastman, and its many subsidiaries have paid more than $82 million in EPA fines. In July 2012, Eastman completed its acquisition of Solutia Inc., a manufacturer of performance materials and specialty chemicals, for $4.8 billion. In December 2014, Eastman Chemical Company completed its acquisition of Taminco Corporation for $2.8 billion.

On the morning of October 4, 2017, an explosion occurred at Eastman's Kingsport Plant around the coal gasification building. In April 2018, the Tennessee Department of Environment and Conservation determined the cause to be a valve blockage due to slurry or debris intrusion.

=== Recycling ===
In 2019, Eastman began commercial-scale chemical recycling for a broad set of waste plastics that would otherwise be placed in a landfill or incinerated. Eastman Advanced Circular Recycling technologies complement mechanical recycling by processing a wide spectrum of waste plastics that traditional recycling methods cannot, including polyesters, polypropylene, polyethylene, and polystyrene. These waste plastics are derived from a variety of sources, including single-use plastics, textiles, and cuttings from discarded carpet.

Eastman claims that its recycling technologies - carbon renewal technology and polyester renewal technology - provide a true circular solution of infinite recycling for materials, allowing them to be reused repeatedly. Eastman began commercial operation of carbon renewal technology in October 2019 at the company's largest manufacturing facility in Kingsport, Tennessee. In 2020, Eastman will use carbon renewal technology to recycle millions of pounds of polyester carpet that would otherwise have been placed in a landfill.

In January 2021, Eastman announced plans to build a methanolysis plant that will convert polyester waste into durable products. The company expects to spend approximately $250 million to build the facility. When completed by the end of 2022, the methanolysis plant will use over 100,000 metric tons of plastic waste that cannot be recycled by current mechanical methods to produce premium, high-quality specialty plastics made with recycled content.

In January 2022, Eastman announced it would invest up to $1 billion in a material-to-material molecular recycling facility in France that would use Eastman's polyester renewal technology to recycle up to 160,000 tons annually of plastic waste. The plant is expected to be operational by 2025.

== Manufacturing sites ==
As of December 2023, Eastman Chemical Company operates 36 manufacturing sites in 12 countries:

United States

- Alvin, Texas
- Anniston, Alabama
- Axton, Virginia
- Chestertown, Maryland
- Columbia, South Carolina
- Fieldale, Virginia
- Kingsport, Tennessee
- Linden, New Jersey
- Longview, Texas
- Martinsville, Virginia
- Pace, Florida
- Springfield, Massachusetts
- St. Gabriel, Louisiana
- Sun Prairie, Wisconsin
- Texas City, Texas
- Watertown, New York

Latin America

- Mauá, Brazil
- Santo Toribio, Mexico

Europe

- Antwerp, Belgium
- Ghent, Belgium
- Kohtla-Järve, Estonia
- Oulu, Finland
- Dresden, Germany
- Leuna, Germany
- Marl, North Rhine-Westphalia, Germany
- Ávila, Spain
- Newport, United Kingdom

Asia Pacific

- Dalian, China
- Nanjing, China
- Suzhou, China
- Wuhan, China
- Zibo City, China
- Ulsan, Korea
- Kuantan, Malaysia
- Hefei, China
- Shenzhen, China

== Corporate responsibility ==
Eastman has been a member of Responsible Care, a voluntary initiative developed autonomously by the chemical industry to improve health, safety, and environmental performance, for more than 25 years. In 2013, Eastman was named Responsible Care Company of the Year in the large company category by the American Chemistry Council (ACC). Eastman was awarded the 2009 Presidential Green Chemistry Challenge Award presented by the U.S. Environmental Protection Agency (EPA). The award recognizes technologies that incorporate the principles of green chemistry into chemical design, manufacture, and use.

In 2013, the EPA designated a 3-km radius circle around the Eastman facility in Kingsport, Tennessee, as non-attainment for the 2010 1-hour sulfur dioxide (SO2) primary National Ambient Air Quality Standard (NAAQS). The State of Tennessee continues to monitor ambient sulfur dioxide levels within the non-attainment area.

Through 2015, Eastman improved energy intensity by approximately 8% compared to a 2008 baseline. The company established a goal to improve energy intensity 20% by 2020. In 2014 and early 2016, Eastman converted two boilers at its Kingsport, Tennessee, site from coal to natural gas combustion. Three additional boilers will be converted by 2018 for a total of five. The Kingsport boiler conversion project is the most significant air pollution control project in the history of Eastman and will diversify the Kingsport facility's energy mix from 90% coal to 50% coal and 50% natural gas. Eastman also converted a coal-fired boiler at its Indian Orchard facility in Springfield, Massachusetts, to natural gas in 2015.

As of 2019, Eastman has been recognized by the U.S. Environmental Protection Agency (EPA) as an ENERGY STAR Partner of the Year eight consecutive years. Eastman has also been recognized three consecutive years by Glassdoor as an Employees' Choice Best Place to Work and by Ethisphere Institute as a World's Most Ethical Company.

=== Mexican pine sourcing controversy ===
An April 2017 article in The Daily Beast reported that Eastman Chemical's plant in Uruapan, Michoacán, bought pine rosin (refined, solidified resin) from a supplier that was known to be controlled by the Knights Templar criminal cartel, even after being notified of the supplier's criminal links. The supplier (Unored) was using the cartel to impose sub-market prices upon the raw pine resin gatherers, with a portion of the reduction passed on to Eastman in lower prices.
