= Myron Fernandes =

Indian footballer

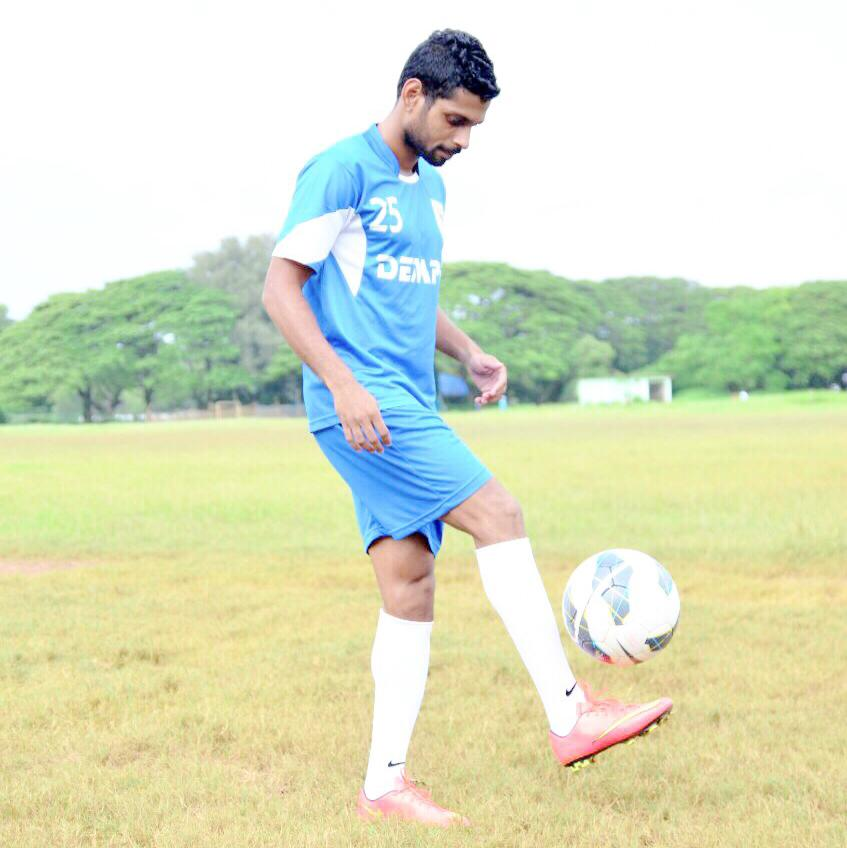
- Myron during a training session with Dempo

Personal information
- Full name: Myron Fernandes
- Date of birth: 2 May 1993 (age 33)
- Place of birth: Mapusa, Goa, India
- Height: 1.68 m (5 ft 6 in)
- Position: Striker

Youth career
- Goa United SA
- Benny XI
- Dempo

Senior career*
Years	Team	Apps	(Gls)
2013–2018	Dempo	232	(74)

International career
2014	India U20	4	(1)
- * Club domestic league appearances and goals

Myron Fernandes (born 2 May 1993) is an Indian professional footballer who plays as a striker.

== Career ==
=== Youth ===
Born in Mapusa, Goa, Fernandes started to play football from the age of nine years. Early on, Myron was trained by then Churchill Brothers S.C. player, Sebastian D’Costa, who was also his uncle. In school Myron played for the U14 side for St. Britto's High School at the age of 11. Later Myron was selected to train at the Goa United Sports Academy under the coaching of Agostinho Dias. Then, at the age of only 15, Fernandes was signed by Benny XI to play for the club's senior side in the Goa First Division which is only a level below the Goa Professional League, the top-tier league in Goa. He managed to score six goals for the club before being signed by Dempo S.C. to join their youth set-up.

In 2008, Fernandes was selected to the Goa U15 to train in Portugal. While in Portugal, Fernandes and Goa trained at the academy of Vitória S.C. and even played against the academy sides of S.C. Braga, S.L. Benfica, and Boavista F.C. for a week. After the stint in Portugal Fernandes was then selected, along with 13 other footballers from Goa, to train at the Manchester United Soccer Schools in Manchester, England. The next year, Fernandes was the only Indian footballer selected for the "Gary Linekar scholarship" which saw him train for one week at the academy of Leicester City.

Then, in February 2011 Fernandes was selected, along with teammate Aniston Fernandes, to train at the academy of Danish Superliga side FC Midtjylland for three to four months.

=== Dempo ===
Fernandes made his professional debut for Dempo S.C. in the I-League on 29 September 2013 against Mumbai F.C. at the Balewadi Sports Complex in which he came on in the 92nd minute for Clifford Miranda as Dempo managed to only draw the match 1–1.

== Personal ==
Fernandes is a fan of Manchester United F.C. and his favorite player is Cristiano Ronaldo.

== Honours ==
India U20 (Goa India)

- Lusofonia Games Gold medal: 2014
