= Joint Munitions Command =

Major Subordinate Command of the United States Army Materiel Command

Joint Munitions Command (JMC)
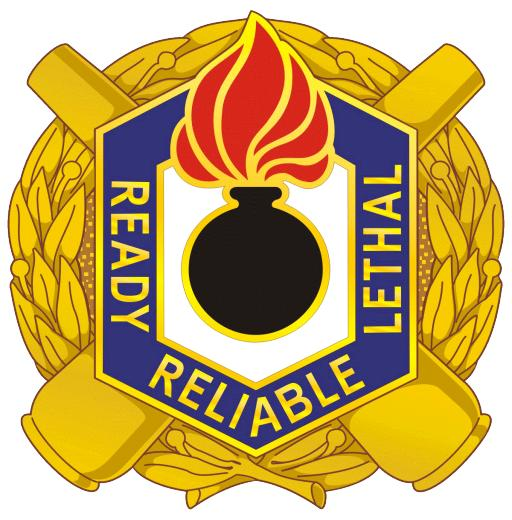
- Active: 2003–2026
- Country: United States
- Type: Major Subordinate Command
- Role: Operate a nationwide network of facilities where conventional ammunition is produced and stored.
- Size: Employs 20 military, over 5800 civilians and 8300 contractor personnel
- Part of: U.S. Army Materiel Command
- Garrison/HQ: Rock Island Arsenal
- Colors: red, yellow, white, black, blue
- Website: www.jmc.army.mil

Commanders
- Current commander: BG Daniel J. Duncan

The Joint Munitions Command (JMC) is the latest in a series of commands since World War II that have managed the ammunition plants of the United States. Since 1973, those commands have been headquartered on Rock Island Arsenal. Brigadier General Daniel J. Duncan commands the JMC. The headquarters on Rock Island Arsenal is responsible for munitions production (ammunition plants) and storage (depots) facilities in 16 states. JMC employs 20 military, over 5800 civilians and 8300 contractor personnel. Of these approximately 14,000 personnel, more than 650 work in the headquarters on Rock Island Arsenal. JMC has an annual budget of 1.2 billion dollars.

JMC provides bombs and bullets to America's fighting forces – all services, all types of conventional ammo from 2,000-pound bombs to rifle rounds. JMC manages plants that produce more than 1.6 billion rounds of ammunition annually and the depots that store the nation's ammunition for training and combat. It is responsible for the management and accountability of $26 billion of conventional munitions and stores $39 billion of missiles.

The Joint Munitions and Lethality Life Cycle Management Command (JM&L LCMC) is one of four life cycle management commands in the Army. Its role is to integrate significant elements of acquisition, logistics, and technology, fostering a closer relationship between the JMC, Program Executive Office-Ammunition and the Army Research Development and Engineering Center. The JM&L LCMC, headquartered at Picatinny Arsenal, New Jersey, and has a 10-person staff that integrates the efforts of PEO-Ammunition, JMC, and ARDEC. JMC has a partnership with the ARDEC and PEO-Ammunition to manage ammunition over its life cycle. ARDEC, which is headquartered in New Jersey and has an office on Rock Island Arsenal, is the research and development arm. PEO-Ammunition and its project managers are the ammunition life cycle managers and are responsible for acquisition of ammunition. JMC manages the ammunition plants and has the responsibility for storing and shipping the ammunition to wherever in the world it is needed. JMC is the logistics arm of the JM&L LCMC.

On Wednesday, June 10 2026 at the Rock Island Arsenal, a ceremony was held of the Joint Munitions Command colors casing as they become part of United States Army Sustainment Command. The ceremony also served as a farewell for Brig. Gen. Daniel Duncan who departed the installation for a position with Army Materiel Command at Redstone Arsenal, Alabama.

== JMC Locations ==
JMC operates a nationwide network of installations and facilities where conventional ammunition is produced and stored.

Production and Storage

| Installation | Location |
|---|---|
| Crane Army Ammunition Activity | Crane, Indiana |
| McAlester Army Ammunition Plant | McAlester, Oklahoma |

Production

| Installation | Location |
|---|---|
| Holston Army Ammunition Plant | Kingsport, Tennessee |
| Iowa Army Ammunition Plant | Middletown, Iowa |
| Lake City Army Ammunition Plant | Independence, Missouri |
| Milan Army Ammunition Plant | Milan, Tennessee |
| Pine Bluff Arsenal | Pine Bluff, Arkansas |
| Radford Army Ammunition Plant | Radford, Virginia |
| Scranton Army Ammunition Plant | Scranton, Pennsylvania |

Storage

| Installation | Location |
|---|---|
| Anniston Munitions Center | Anniston, Alabama |
| Blue Grass Army Depot | Richmond, Kentucky |
| Hawthorne Army Depot | Hawthorne, Nevada |
| Letterkenny Munitions Center | Chambersburg, Pennsylvania |
| Tooele Army Depot | Tooele, Utah |

Training and Special Services

| Installation | Location |
|---|---|
| Defense Ammunition Center | McAlester, Oklahoma |

While all JMC facilities are government-owned, contractors operate the 10 production-only facilities and Hawthorne Army Depot.

== BRAC ==
The following installations closed on or before 2011 as part of the 2005 Base Realignment and Closure Commission findings

| Installation | Location |
|---|---|
| Lone Star Army Ammunition Plant | Texarkana, Texas |
| Mississippi Army Ammunition Plant | Stennis Space Center, Mississippi |
| Riverbank Army Ammunition Plant | Riverbank, California |
| Red River Munitions Center | Texarkana, Texas |

- Information compiled from
