= Football at the 2014 Lusofonia Games =

The Football tournament of the 2014 Lusophony Games took place in Goa, India at the Fatorda Stadium and Tilak Maidan. The tournament was played from 19 to 28 January 2014. There was only men's competition and U20 teams represented their nations.

== Group stage ==
=== Group A ===
Team	Pld	W	D	L	GF	GA	GD	Pts
Sri Lanka	2	1	1	0	2	1	+1	4
Macau	2	1	0	1	2	2	0	3
São Tomé and Príncipe	2	0	1	1	2	3	-1	1

19 January 2014
17:30 IST

Macau	0–1	Sri Lanka
	Report	Rathnake 41'

Tilak Maidan Stadium, Vasco

21 January 2014
17:30 IST

São Tomé and Príncipe	1–1	Sri Lanka
Bastos 21'	Report	Zawran 90'

Tilak Maidan Stadium, Vasco

23 January 2014
17:30 IST

Macau	2-1	São Tomé and Príncipe
Hou 1', 90+3'	Report	Neto 56'

Tilak Maidan Stadium, Vasco

=== Group B ===
Team	Pld	W	D	L	GF	GA	GD	Pts
India	2	1	0	1	2	2	0	3
Mozambique	2	1	0	1	2	2	0	3

20 January 2014
17:30 IST

Mozambique	1–2	India
Gaumbe 86'	Report	Harijan 56'; Desai 60'

Tilak Maidan Stadium, Vasco

22 January 2014
17:30 IST

India	0–1	Mozambique
	Report	Costa 57' (o.g.)

Tilak Maidan Stadium, Vasco

== Semi-finals ==
25 January 2014
17:30 IST

Sri Lanka	0–1 (a.e.t.)	Mozambique
	Report	Miquissone 92'

Fatorda Stadium, Margao

26 January 2014
19:00 IST

India	2–0	Macau
Fernandes 17'; Noronha 89'	Report

Fatorda Stadium, Margao

== Bronze Medal ==
28 January 2014
16:00 IST

Sri Lanka	3–0	Macau
Ishan 10'; Chandrathna 58'; Zorwan 72'	Report

Fatorda Stadium, Margao

== Gold medal match ==
28 January 2014
19:00 IST

Mozambique	2–3	India
Matimbe 24'; Luis 72'	Report	D’Silva 3'; B. Fernandes 41'; M. Fernandes 51'

Fatorda Stadium, Margao

== See also ==
- ACOLOP
- Lusophony Games
- 2014 Lusophony Games
