= Anniston Munitions Center =

Facility of the US Army Joint Munitions Command

Coordinates: 33°37′36″N 85°59′9″W

The Anniston Defense Munitions Center (ADMC) located at the Anniston Army Depot in Bynum, Alabama, is a multi-functional ammunition facility under the US Army Joint Munitions Command. The primary mission is receipt, storage, surveillance and shipment of missiles and conventional ammunition. The ADMC is the site of the Department of Army’s only Missile Recycling Center and is one of the Army’s premium ammunition storage sites because it is capable of storing some of the Army’s largest munitions.

== Capabilities ==
Capabilities of the center include: ammunition renovation; shipping, receiving, outloading; preservation, packaging and maintenance; quality assurance; explosive demilitarization; and missile recycling.

== History ==
Anniston Ordnance Depot was established in February 1941. In 1952, the depot was assigned a maintenance mission for the overhaul and repair of combat vehicles. In 1962, the installation was renamed Anniston Army Depot and became part of the Army Materiel Command. In 1976, Anniston Army Depot became a part of the U.S. Army Depot System Command. In 1995, it became part of the Industrial Operations Command. In 1998, the 722nd Ordnance Company relocated from Fort McClellan, Ala. to Anniston Army Depot under Base Realignment and Closure 1995. Also in 1998, the conventional ammunition mission became a tenant organization function of the newly established Anniston Munitions Center. In 2004, the name was changed to the Anniston Defense Munitions Center. On October 1, 1999, ADMC officially came under the full command and control of Blue Grass Army Depot in Richmond, Ky. ADMC received its first on-site commander in June 2004.

== Facilities ==
ADMC is housed on 13,160 acres (53.3 km^{2}) with 33 buildings, 1,124 igloos and a storage capacity of 2,500,000 square feet (230,000 m^{2}).
