= McAlester Army Ammunition Plant =

Facility of the US Army Joint Munitions Command

Coordinates: 34°49′36″N 95°55′26″W

McAlester Army Ammunition Plant (MCAAP) is a weapons manufacturing facility for the United States Department of Defense in McAlester, Oklahoma, US. The facility is part of the US Army Joint Munitions Command. Its mission is to produce and renovate conventional ammunition and ammunition-related components. The plant stores war reserve and training ammunition. McAlester performs manufacturing, industrial engineering, and production product assurance. The plant also receives, demilitarizes, and disposes of conventional ammunition components. The plant is the largest, in terms of storage, housing close to one-third of the Department of Defense's munitions stockpile.

== Capabilities ==
The center's capabilities include: manufacturing; logistics support; demilitarization and disposal; training support; safety and environmental protection; research and development; and renovation. The facility produces a range of munitions from 20 mm shells to the 11 short tons (10 t) Massive Ordnance Air Blast (MOAB). As part of the facility's logistical duties, it provides maintenance on all rail lines connected to the facility. The facility is in charge of demilitarization and disposal of bombs that it receives. Through this process the facility receives outdated or nonfunctional munitions and breaks them down by each component. What cannot be reused is disposed of either by blast furnace, burning, or open air detonation.

== History ==
Due to the increased strain of the American military during World War II, the Department of Defense moved to build more munitions facilities within the nation. MCAAP was established on May 20, 1943 as the McAlester Naval Depot. It became part of the Army's Single Manager for Conventional Ammunition in 1977. After the 1995 Base Realignment and Closure Commission, it acquired Red River Munitions Center in 1999. As a result of the 2005 Base Realignment and Closure Commission, MCAAP will be acquiring additional workload. From Kansas Army Ammunition Plant, it will acquire the Sensor Fuzed Weapon and missile warhead production. From Red River Munitions Center, Lone Star Army Ammunition Plant, and Sierra Army Depot, it will acquire demilitarization, storage, and maintenance functions.

== Contracts ==
On August 26, 2020, Toyal America Inc. of Lockport, Illinois, was awarded roughly $12.7 million to provide MCAAP with aluminum powder.

== Facilities ==
MCAAP is housed on 44,964 acres (182 km^{2}) with 2,891 buildings, 2,426 igloos and storage capacity of 8,840,559 square feet (821,315 m^{2}). MCAAP provides many different services for those members of the Armed Forces stationed on the base. A child care facility is on location. A clinic is also located on the base, providing minor outpatient services for the civilian workers and the service members living there.

An article in the February 24, 2011 issue of the Army Times announced that a ceremony was to be held to mark the opening of a new $17-million dollar, 54,000-square-foot (5,000 m^{2}) armed forces reserve center for reserve component units, replacing old reserve centers and national guard armories in various locations that have been or are being converted to community centers or municipal buildings.
