= Radford Army Ammunition Plant =

Facility of the US Army Joint Munitions Command

Coordinates: 37°11′02″N 80°32′41″W

Radford Army Ammunition Plant (RFAAP) is an ammunition manufacturing complex for the U.S. military with facilities located in Pulaski and Montgomery Counties, Virginia. The primary mission of the RFAAP is to manufacture propellants and explosives in support of field artillery, air defense, tank, missile, aircraft, and naval weapons systems. As of 2011 RFAAP is operated by BAE Systems under contract to the US Army Joint Munitions Command. The current Commander for the Radford Army Ammunition Plant (RAAP) is Lt. Col. Adrien G. Humphreys.

== History ==
RFAAP was established April 5, 1941 as Radford Ordnance Works and New River Plant. In 1945, the works was renamed Radford Arsenal and the New River Ordnance Works was assumed as a subpost until 1950, when it became an integral part of the Radford Arsenal.

In 1961 the arsenal was renamed Radford Ordnance Plant and RFAAP in 1963. The facility used an ALCO MRS-1 military diesel locomotive, road number B2072, for switching, which was retired by the 1980s and scrapped at Cycle Systems in Roanoke, Virginia around 1993.

From 1970 to 1985, there were nine major explosions at RFAAP that caused multiple deaths and millions in damage. Notably, an explosion equivalent to 8,600 pounds of TNT destroyed the plant's TNT manufacturing facility and injured 100 workers in 1974, and a 5,000-pound nitroglycerine explosion in 1985 killed two employees and left a half-acre crater.

In 1995, Alliant Techsystems, parent company ATK Armament Systems, obtained a "facilities use" contract. In 1999, RFAAP gained the load, assembly and pack mission with the closure of Joliet Army Ammunition Plant in Illinois. "Radford is capable of producing mass quantities of solvent and solventless propellants to support direct fire, indirect fire, and rocket applications."

On May 12, 2011, the Army announced that BAE Systems had won the "facilities use" contract to become the plant operator.

As of 2017, the plant was the largest supplier of artillery propellant in the United States.

== 2025 explosion incident ==
On February 28, 2025, an explosion occurred in an ammunition production bay at the Radford Army Ammunition Plant. No injuries were reported and no ongoing safety or environmental hazards were identified by plant officials. Following the explosion, affected production zones were placed in a safety stand-down. The incident, which caused notable property damage, was reported to the U.S. Chemical Safety Board and the Bureau of Alcohol, Tobacco, Firearms, and Explosives is leading the investigation.

== Facilities ==
RFAAP is housed on 4,600 acres (19 km^{2}) with 1,038 buildings, 214 igloos and storage capacity of 657,003 square feet where the New River divides Pulaski from Montgomery County.

RFAAP is home to several tenants of similar industry, including:

- New River Energetics – Commercial Propellants
- Alliant Techsystems – Medium Caliber LAP
- Appalachian Railcar Service – Railcar Repair
- Alliant Ordnance – Laboratory Facilities
- Med Cal LAP – Manufacture of 25MM & 30MM Ammo
- Montgomery County PSA – Drinking Water Sales to Montgomery County
- Alexander Arms – Development, manufacturing, and sales of commercial rifles and ammunition
- ALTESS – US Army Acquisition, Logistics & Technology Enterprise Systems & Service
- Waco Inc. – Mechanical work on pipes and buildings, abatement of any asbestos containing materials and lead abatement.
- Virginia Tech – Rail Car unloading and Coal Storage
- Pyrotechnique by Grucci – Manufacture custom pyrotechnics for fireworks and DOD simulators.
- NTS – testing & lab support
- Cave Spring Painting – Equipment storage for commercial painting
- Alliant Painting – Equipment storage for residential painting
- Valley Turf – Office & Maintenance Shop for RFAAP mowing contractor and lawn tractor repairs
- US Cellular – Cellular Communications Tower Site
- Crown Castle (CFW Wireless) – Cellular Communications Tower Site
- GDOTS – General Dynamics MK-90 Field Rep Office

== Environmental problems ==
A 2014 inspection by the US Environmental Protection Agency (EPA) found that in 2021, the US Army and the plant's operators misreported the amounts of lead, dibutyl phthalate, and nitric acid that were shipped off site as waste from the plant, and failed to report copper waste altogether. The inspection also found the US Army and the plant's operators failed to report excess emissions from the plant's smokestacks on 287 separate occasions between 2011 and 2013.

In 2014 and 2015, the plant released more than 10 million pounds of toxic emissions, the single largest source of toxic emissions in the Commonwealth of Virginia, according to the federal Toxics Release Inventory. The EPA estimates that health risks to individuals who live near the plant are over 158,000 times greater than for residents in other parts of Virginia.

In June 2015, the plant requested a renewal of its permit of an open burning ground which it has used for decades to dispose of its waste. The ground is "located on the north bank of the New River in the Horseshoe Area, a section of the plant surrounded on three sides by the river." Rapid modernization is addressing this concern.
