= Production assurance =

Production assurance is a way to ensure a productive capacity meets its intended end-results such as customer requirements, planned production levels, safety, reliability, risk and direct economic cost. The term is used in industries as far reaching as livestock production, oil and gas and information technology. Production assurance is broadly related to productivity and quality management since organizational and human factors must be considered, as well as technical aspects. ISO 20815:2008 introduces production assurance as a concept composed of twelve processes where "seven are defined as core production-assurance processes".

Production assurance normally exists in the context of an enterprise or between producers and oversight bodies, such as regulators.

== See also ==
- Quality assurance
- Quality control
