= Toyobo =

Japanese manufacturers of fibres and textiles

Toyobo Co., Ltd. 東洋紡績株式会社

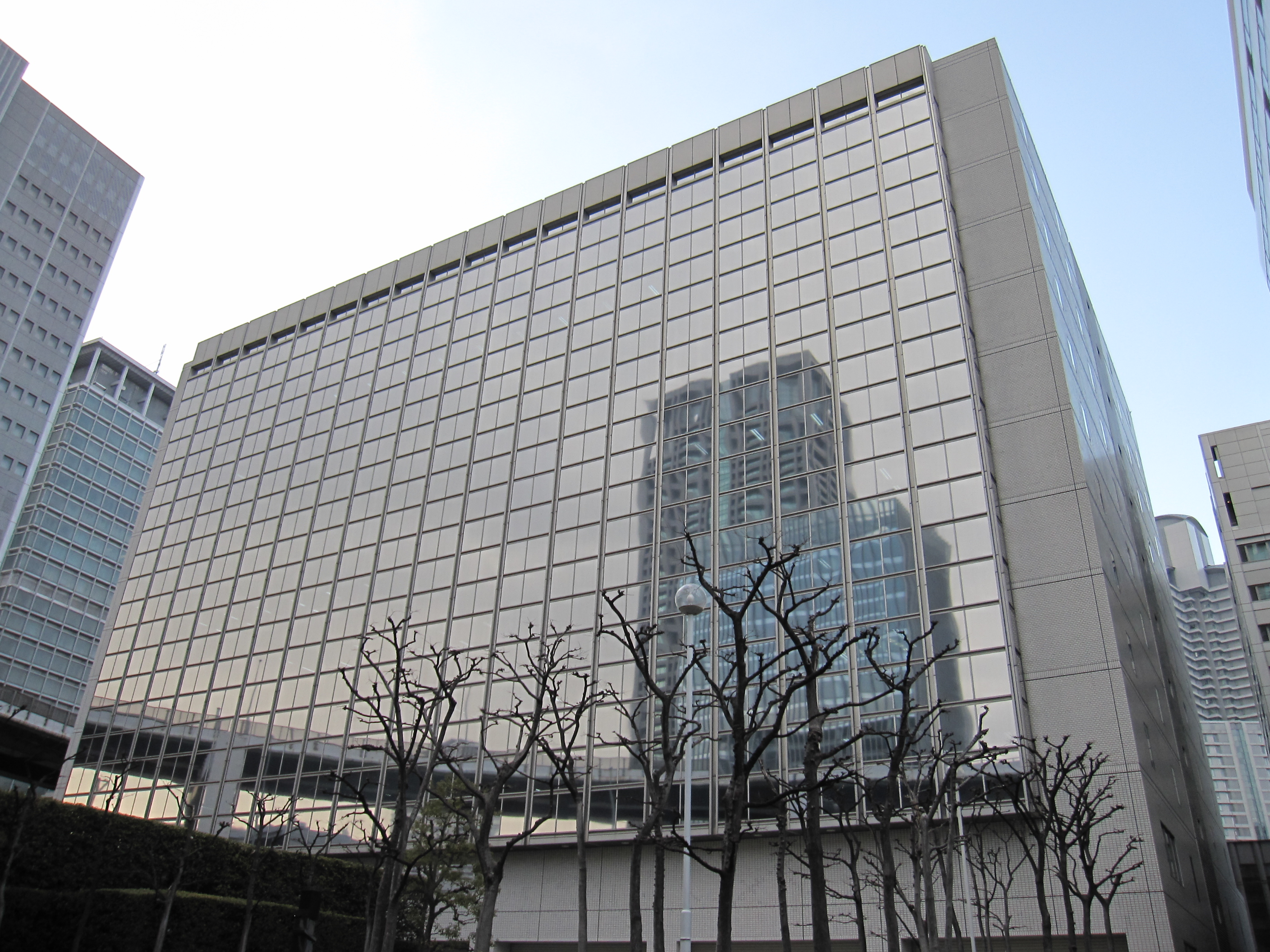
- The company headquarters building in Osaka
- Type: Public (K.K)
- Traded as: TYO: 3101; Nikkei 225 Component
- Industry: Textile
- Founded: Osaka (May 1882; 144 years ago)
- Headquarters: 2-8, Dojima Hama 2-chome, Kita-ku, Osaka 530-8230, Japan
- Key people: Ryuzo Sakamoto (Chairman of the board); Seiji Narahara (President)
- Products: Synthetic fibers; Textiles; Functional materials; Plastic films; Biochemical products; Medical reagents
- Revenue: ▲US$ 3.41 billion (FY 2013) (JPY 351.57 billion) (FY 2013)
- Net income: ▲US$ 79.2 million (FY 2013) (JPY 8.15 billion) (FY 2013)
- Number of employees: 10,487 (consolidated, as of March 31, 2014)
- Website: Official website

Toyobo Co., Ltd. (東洋紡績株式会社, Tōyōbōseki Kabushiki-gaisha) is one of Japan's top makers of fibers and textiles, including synthetic fibers (polyester, nylon and acrylics) and natural fibers, such as cotton and wool.

== History ==
Toyobo was established in 1882 by Shibusawa Eiichi as a cotton-spinning company in a context of post-Meiji Restoration. By the 1930s, Toyobo was the world's largest cotton-spinning company. In the 1960s, the company started to manufacture synthetic fibers and films.

In August 2013, Toyobo bought the Spanish company Spinreact for €22.3 million euros.

In 2015, Toyobo provided 40% of the yarn for airbags worldwide, and 50% of Japan's food packaging films. In March 2017, Toyobo introduced Cocomi, a t-shirt that tracks a driver's heartbeats and activates an alarm if somnolence is detected. In August 2017, Toyobo established a new group in Europe, Toyobo Chemicals Europe GmbH, with a focus on marketing specialty chemical products, and a new manufacturing base for airbag fabrics.

In March 2018, Toyobo paid $66 million to settle a case of defective bulletproof vests sold to the US Government between 2001 and 2005.

== Activities ==
Kinome River with the Toyobo factory in the background, Tsuruga

Toyobo's textiles are designed for clothing, home furnishings, and for industrial uses. Textiles include spandex yarn for apparel, polyurethane fiber for pantyhose, yarns for airbags and tire cords and synthetic fibers for apparel. Toyobo is also engaged in the spinning, weaving, knitting, dyeing, sewing, and the wholesaling and trading of textiles in Japan and internationally.

Toyobo also manufactures plastic films, and resins. Biochemical products such as reagents, medical products (e.g. fiber membranes for artificial organs), and purification devices are also manufactured by the company.

The company operates across Japan, China, South Korea, Singapore, Malaysia, Australia, United States, and Germany and is listed on the Tokyo Stock Exchange, being a component of the Nikkei 225 stock index.

== Gallery ==
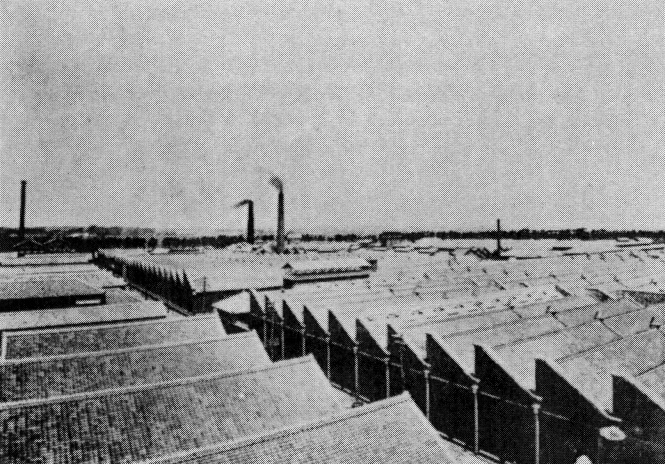
The Toyobo Chita factory in 1926

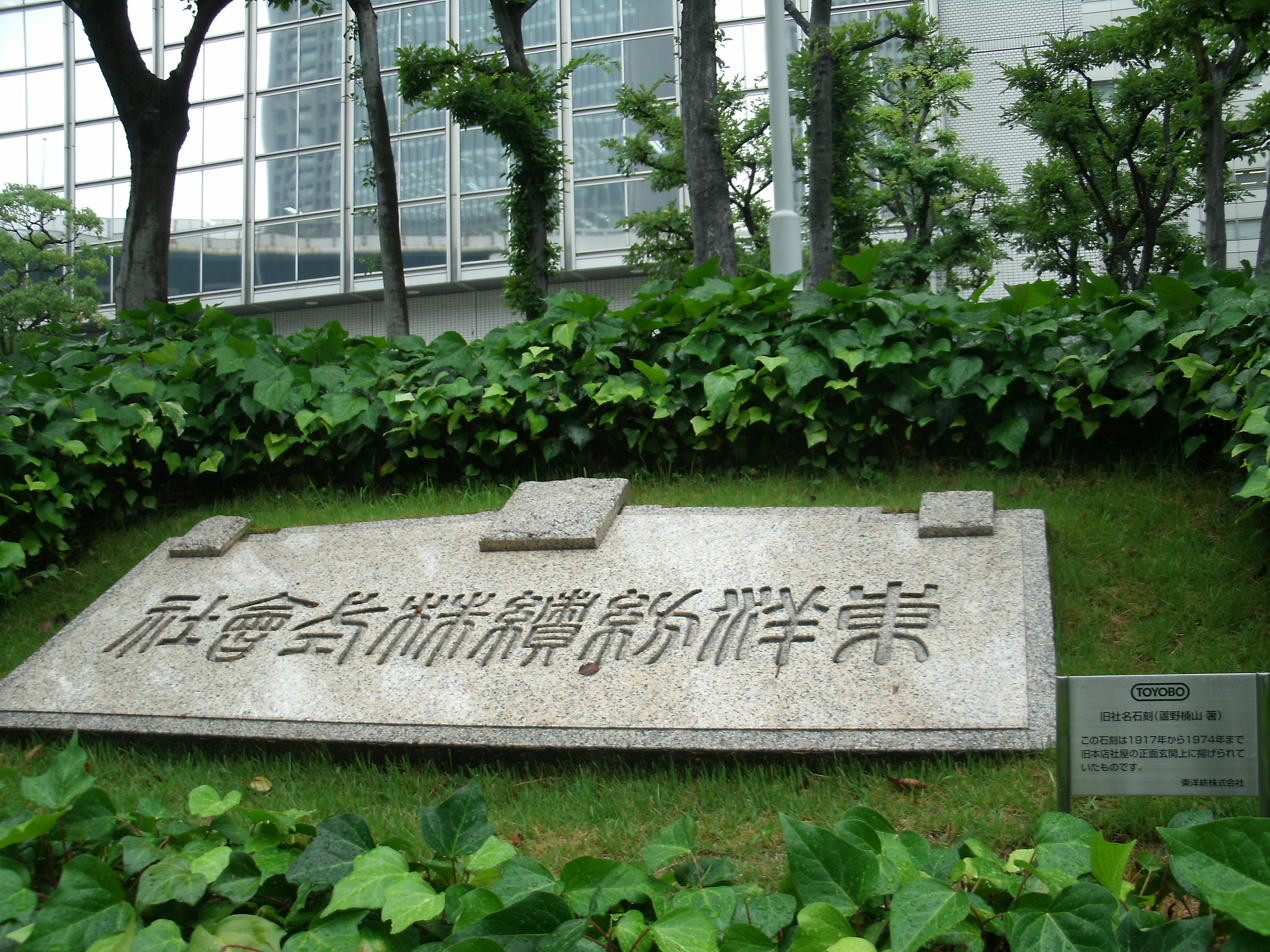
The nameplate of the former company headquarters

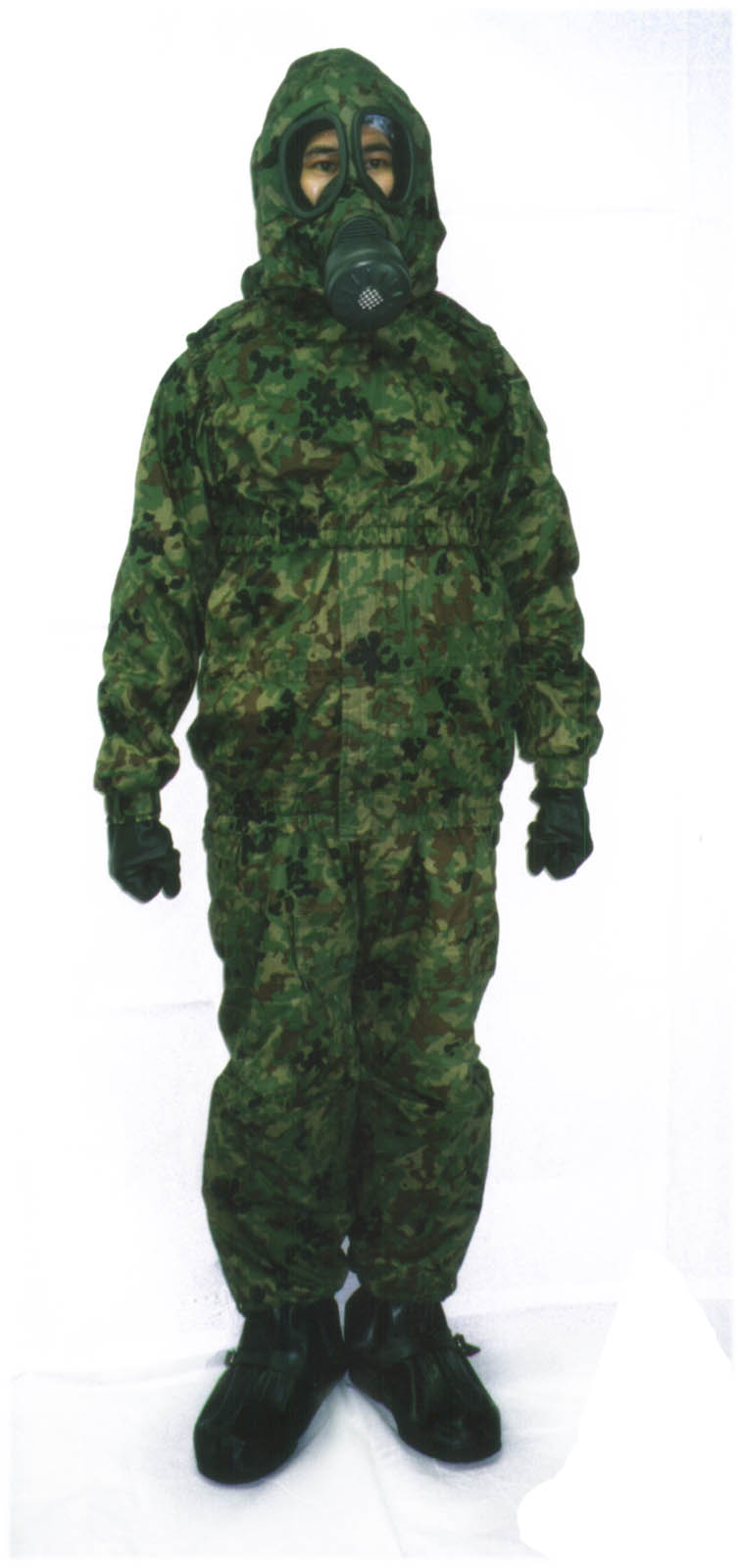
JSDF standard Personal protective equipment (also known informally as Type 00) NBC suit. Produced in cooperation with Nikko Research Co., Ltd.

== See also ==
- Biodefense
