= Early March 2025 North American blizzard =

2025 storm in the United States

- The storm complex moving over the Central United States in the evening hours of March 4

Meteorological history
- Formed: March 2, 2025

Tornado outbreak
- Tornadoes: 39
- Max. rating: EF2 tornado
- Duration: March 3–6, 2025

Blizzard
- Highest gusts: 105 miles per hour (169 km/h) in Haltom City, Texas
- Lowest pressure: 980
- Max. snowfall: 24 inches (61 cm) in Marquette, Michigan on March 5th

Overall effects
- Fatalities: 6
- Injuries: 10
- Damage: $2.5 billion (2025 USD)
- Areas affected: Southern United States
- Power outages: >423,300
- Part of the 2024–25 North American winter

A large-scale extratropical cyclone brought blizzard conditions across the Upper Midwest starting March 4, 2025, causing widespread gusty winds and several tornadoes. Developing on March 2, the system developed as a Colorado low and rapidly strengthened on March 4. Very gusty winds were prevalent due to the immense size and strength of the system as a result.

Over 400,000 power outages were reported to have been inflicted by the storm in the Dallas–Fort Worth metroplex, and at least six people were killed, three in Nebraska and three in Mississippi. The storm was the first major weather event to hit the United States since the mass layoff of federal employees at the National Oceanic and Atmospheric Administration.

== Meteorological synopsis ==
Map plotting the storm's track and intensity, according to the Saffir–Simpson scale Map key Saffir–Simpson scale Tropical depression (≤38 mph, ≤62 km/h) Tropical storm (39–73 mph, 63–118 km/h) Category 1 (74–95 mph, 119–153 km/h) Category 2 (96–110 mph, 154–177 km/h) Category 3 (111–129 mph, 178–208 km/h) Category 4 (130–156 mph, 209–251 km/h) Category 5 (≥157 mph, ≥252 km/h) Unknown Storm type Tropical cyclone Subtropical cyclone Extratropical cyclone, remnant low, tropical disturbance, or monsoon depression

The Storm Prediction Center (SPC) outlined an enhanced risk across portions of Texas, Louisiana, Arkansas, Mississippi, Alabama, far-western Georgia and northwestern Florida. Across portions of Texas and New Mexico, strong winds from the storm led the SPC to issue an extremely critical fire risk. An estimated 64 million people were under storm watches and warnings on March 4.

The Weather Prediction Center (WPC) had a 50% chance of significant winter precipitation accumulation as far as 5 days out for the Upper Peninsula of Michigan as well as eastern Canada.

== Impacts ==
=== Alabama ===
The Alabama Emergency Management Agency reported that gusty winds, with sustained speeds of 15 mph (24 km/h) to 25 mph (40 km/h) and gusts reaching up to 45 mph (72 km/h), led to numerous downed trees and power lines, particularly in central parts of the state.

In Winston County, the storms uprooted trees and damaged structures. A large tree crashed into an occupied home in Haleyville; no injuries were reported. Structural damage occurred in Lynn, and multiple reports indicated trees and power lines down throughout the county. As of March 5, over 200 residents in Winston County and more than 350 in Marion County were without power.

The severe weather also led to widespread power outages across Alabama. At the height of the storms on March 4, approximately 88,000 customers experienced power interruptions.

In response to the extensive damage, cleanup efforts commenced promptly. Crews worked diligently to remove fallen trees, repair power lines, and restore services to affected communities.

=== Iowa ===
Pottawattamie County and the city of Council Bluffs declared snow emergencies ahead of heavy snow produced by the storm.

Blizzard warnings were issued across the western and central parts of Iowa, with rain quickly transitioning to snow. Blizzard conditions were achieved over much of the warned area, with widespread wind gusts of 55–65 mph (89–105 km/h) leading to visibilities of less than half a mile in most locations, with a peak gust of 68 mph (109 km/h) in Lamoni. During the morning of March 5, a 15+ vehicle pileup occurred on I-35 in between Ames and Des Moines, leading to both directions of the interstate being shut down between those two cities. A separate pileup occurred on I-80 near Newton. I-80 west-bound was declared impassable between Avoca and Des Moines due to widespread zero visibility and drifting snow.

Prior to turning to snow, significant rain also fell across the state, with 1.7 in (43 mm) of total liquid in Ames and 1.4 in (36 mm) in Des Moines.

=== Illinois ===
The National Weather Service in Chicago reported that areas near and south of Interstate 80 received over 2 in (51 mm) of rain during this storm.

In Alton, the area experienced a minor snowstorm on Wednesday, receiving less than an inch of snow. However, the accompanying winds caused more significant issues than the snow itself, including knocking down tree limbs, tossing trash cans, and overturning outdoor objects. Sporadic power outages were also reported in different areas due to the snow and wind.

Wind gusts up to 52 mph (84 km/h) occurred at Quad Cities International Airport in Rock Island County, Illinois, as did a low-pressure reading of 980.8 mb (980.8 hPa), occurring at 4 a.m. on March 5, the lowest pressure reading at the airport since March 1, 2007.

=== Kansas ===
Significant disruptions occurred in Finney County, where eleven semi-trucks were blown off the road, a building lost its roof, and a traffic light fell onto a vehicle—fortunately without injuries. Several trees fell, some onto houses, and numerous power lines and utility poles were downed. US-50/US-400 was closed between Deerfield and Lakin due to blowing dust. The hazardous conditions produced by the dust storm led to accidents, including a two-vehicle crash in Kearny. The storm's winds shattered vehicle windows at a Tyson Foods facility in Holcomb, likely due to flying tumbleweeds or gravel. In Douglas County, a semi-truck and trailer slid across US-56, blocking traffic for several hours amid slick roads and high winds. There was also approximately 2,300 power outages in the county seat of Lawrence. In Dorrance, a dust devil shattered the back window of a vehicle, and in Norton, strong winds blew a chimney cap off a house. The storm also produced blowing snow in Goodland, creating additional travel hazards.

The strongest recorded wind gust in Kansas was 93 mph (150 km/h) near Hugoton, while Wichita experienced a gust of 58 mph (93 km/h). An 85 mph (137 km/h) wind gust was recorded in the Garden City area. Rainfall in Chautauqua County reached 2.46 in (62 mm) and Elk County saw 2.32 in (59 mm).

=== Louisiana ===
Mardi Gras celebrations in New Orleans were carried out earlier than usual ahead of the storm. In Natchitoches, high winds downed trees.

=== Michigan ===
Frequent wind gusts of 35–50 mph (56–80 km/h) combined with the maximum recorded storm snowfall of 24 inches caused prolific blizzard conditions across northern Michigan. These conditions caused the closure of Michigan Technological University and Northern Michigan University on March 5th.

=== Mississippi ===
Severe storms swept through Mississippi, causing three fatalities and widespread damage across multiple counties. The storms also produced an EF2 tornado in Wayne County and an EF1 tornado in George County as well as strong winds and heavy rain. The fatalities included two individuals in Madison County—one from a tree falling on their car and another from a downed power line—and a woman in Clarke County who died when a falling tree limb struck her.

The storms damaged at least fourteen homes and six farms across Clarke, Harrison, Madison, Perry, Warren, and Wayne counties. Wayne County, in particular, experienced significant agricultural losses, impacting the local economy. At the height of the storms, over 38,000 residents were without power, with around 6,800 still affected the following day.

Recovery efforts are underway, with local and state emergency management agencies coordinating assistance.

=== Missouri ===
Dozens of vehicle accidents resulted in two injuries across Missouri. Wind gusts reached up to 54 mph (87 km/h) in Kansas City, with a 68 mph (109 km/h) gust recorded in Rosendale. Light snow was also reported in the area.

=== New Mexico ===
A large dust cloud caused motor vehicle accidents in southern portions of the state of New Mexico. In Roswell, visibility dropped below 0.25 mi (0.40 km).

=== Texas ===
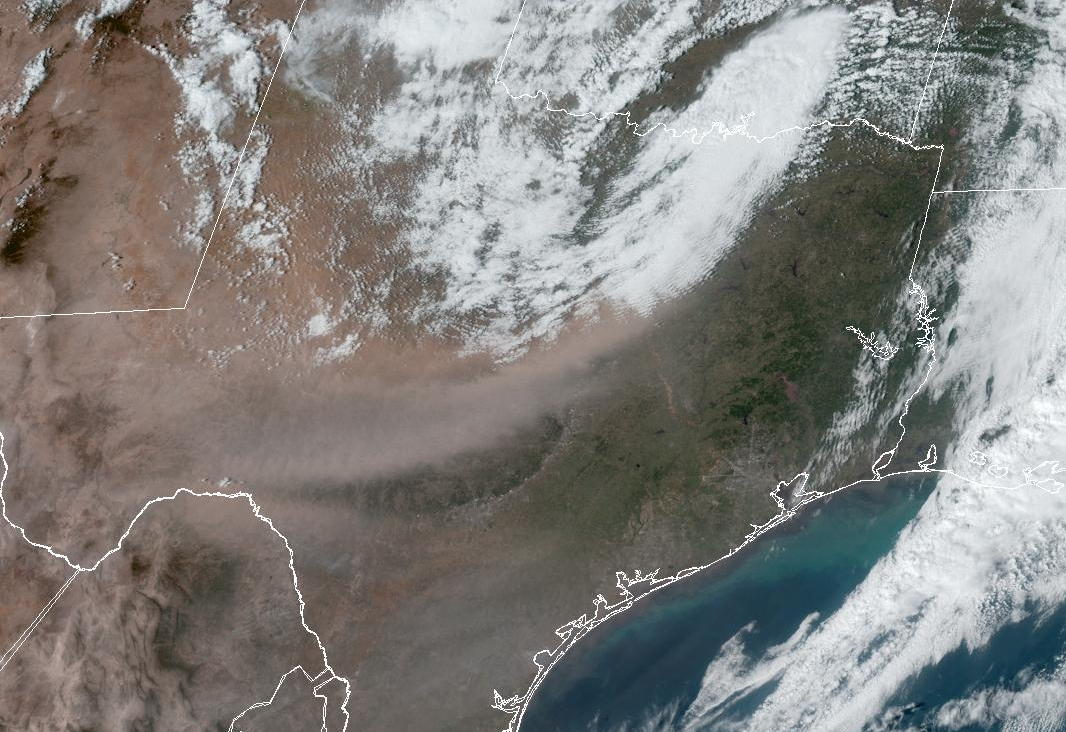
A large dust cloud produced by the storm moving over Central Texas

In North Texas, an EF1 tornado touched down in Irving, causing substantial structural damage. Hundreds of residents were evacuated from an apartment complex due to roof collapses and compromised structural integrity. Additionally, hurricane-force winds reaching up to 78 mph (126 km/h) were recorded at Dallas Love Field Airport, resulting in widespread power outages affecting approximately 318,000 customers. The severe winds also led to overturned 18-wheelers and roof damages in the Dallas–Fort Worth metroplex. Plano West Senior High School experienced partial roof loss, leading to flooding in its sports facilities. Firefighters in Dallas responded to multiple incidents, including roof damage at an apartment complex, where a chimney fell over from the winds. A massive haboob enveloped the metroplex, reducing visibility and causing traffic accidents.

In Central Texas and South Texas, high winds caused significant power outages and brush fires, with over 31,000 Austin residents left without electricity as of the afternoon of March 4. Austin Energy reported more than 140 active outages and 68 hazards, deploying all available crews to restore power. In San Antonio's southern region, the Calaveras Fire prompted the evacuation of approximately 182 homes. The fire consumed 284 acres before being fully contained by March 5, with no reported injuries. In Hays County, the Onion Creek Fire near Buda burned 190 acres and was 85% contained as of March 6. Temporary evacuations were lifted, but fire crews continued to monitor and secure the area. The Welder Complex Fire in San Patricio County, northeast of Sinton, affected 803 acres and reached 95% containment by March 6.

In Southeast Texas, a large dust cloud hit Houston, dropping visibility to as low as 3 mi (4.8 km) in some areas and causing poor air quality.

=== Oklahoma ===
In the early morning hours of March 4, an EF1 tornado hit Ada, Oklahoma, injuring one person in the town. Ada was left largely without power as a result of the tornado. The Owasso Police Department in Owasso reported flooding from the storm on several streets.

=== Northeastern United States ===
Radar imagery of the storm system’s impacts in the Tri-State region, featuring a predominant squall line.

In Pennsylvania, pea-sized hail was recorded as the storm complex moved over the Northeast late on March 5. New York City experienced heavy rainfall that inundated underground subway stations. In addition, a wind advisory was issued early on March 6 from the National Weather Service, with gusts reaching 45 to 50 mph (72.4 to 80.4 kmh). In Woodbine, New Jersey, wind gusts reached 69 mph (111 km/h) during the storm. Throughout the New York metropolitan area, around 2 inches (50.8 mm) of rain fell. Further north, the University of Connecticut was forced to cancel certain classes early on March 6 due to a power outage on campus. However, the rainfall in the state did help mitigate the drought conditions occurring in the state.

== Confirmed tornadoes ==
Confirmed tornadoes by Enhanced Fujita rating
EFU	EF0	EF1	EF2	EF3	EF4	EF5	Total
1	7	30	1	0	0	0	39

=== March 4 event ===
List of confirmed tornadoes – Tuesday, March 4, 2025 (Note: All dates are based on the local time zone where the tornado touched down; however, all times are in Coordinated Universal Time for consistency.)
EF#	Location	County / Parish	State	Start Coord.	Time (UTC)	Path length	Max width
EF1	N of Lone Grove	Carter	OK	34.232°N 97.268°W	10:28–10:29	0.5 mi (0.80 km)	120 yd (110 m)
EF1	Three homes were damaged, and three people were injured in one of the homes.						
EF1	S of Bridgeport	Wise	TX	33.1057°N 97.7517°W	10:30–10:35	3.17 mi (5.10 km)	250 yd (230 m)
EF1	This high-end EF1 tornado ripped most of the roof off of a home and caused minor damage to two nearby outbuildings. The tornado continued causing fascia and roof damage to frame homes, manufactured homes, and outbuildings before lifting. Damage to tree limbs also occurred.						
EF0	Northern Gene Autry	Carter	OK	34.287°N 97.038°W	10:43–10:44	1.2 mi (1.9 km)	40 yd (37 m)
EF0	A mobile home, a barn, and another building sustained minor damage.						
EF0	W of Fittstown	Pontotoc	OK	34.545°N 96.726°W	11:03–11:12	8.8 mi (14.2 km)	100 yd (91 m)
EF0	An RV was blown over and an outbuilding damaged near the beginning of the path. The tornado moved northeast damaging trees and producing shingle damage to a home. One other outbuilding was damaged just west of US 377 as the tornado was dissipating.						
EF1	Ada	Pontotoc	OK	34.768°N 96.706°W	11:11–11:15	3.7 mi (6.0 km)	200 yd (180 m)
EF1	This tornado began in western Ada and moved directly through the center of town, causing considerable damage. An old brick building was destroyed, while apartment buildings, businesses, and a school suffered partial roof loss. Houses, mobile homes, utility poles, and trees were also damaged throughout the city. One person was injured.						
EF1	NW of Stonewall	Pontotoc	OK	34.694°N 96.595°W	11:16–11:17	1 mi (1.6 km)	40 yd (37 m)
EF1	A volunteer fire station was heavily damaged, the roof of a home was damaged, and numerous trees were snapped.						
EF1	Irving	Dallas	TX	32.8179°N 96.9572°W	11:24–11:25	0.42 mi (0.68 km)	85 yd (78 m)
EF1	A brief high-end EF1 tornado touched down in Irving and downed multiple trees, one of which fell onto and damaged a vehicle. Every building at an apartment complex sustained heavy roof damage, including partial roof loss. The Irving Police Academy Family Advocacy building lost about half of its roof, and a nearby daycare center was damaged.						
EF1	Northern Allen	Pontotoc	OK	34.856°N 96.483°W	11:25–11:30	4.8 mi (7.7 km)	150 yd (140 m)
EF1	A tornado formed to the north of the rural community of Steedman and moved to the northeast, where a mobile home, a barn, and trees were damaged. It moved through the north side of Allen shortly before it dissipated, damaging multiple buildings.						
EF1	Nida	Johnston	OK	34.139°N 96.503°W	11:37–11:39	1.56 mi (2.51 km)	100 yd (91 m)
EF1	Barns, outbuildings and a mobile home were destroyed.						
EF1	NE of Horntown	Hughes	OK	35.097°N 96.229°W	11:46–11:49	2.88 mi (4.63 km)	50 yd (46 m)
EF1	A low-end EF1 tornado damaged at least two buildings.						
EF1	SSW of Henryetta	Okmulgee	OK	35.404°N 96.001°W	12:06–12:09	1.8 mi (2.9 km)	375 yd (343 m)
EF1	This tornado damaged and destroyed outbuildings, damaged homes, and uprooted trees.						
EF1	SE of Henryetta to ESE of Dewar	Okmulgee	OK	35.423°N 95.957°W	12:10–12:15	3.3 mi (5.3 km)	350 yd (320 m)
EF1	Large tree limbs and trees were snapped, and some outbuildings were damaged.						
EF1	NNW of Morris to S of Bald Hill	Okmulgee	OK	35.66°N 95.893°W	12:22–12:25	2.7 mi (4.3 km)	400 yd (370 m)
EF1	An RV was rolled, several power poles were snapped, three homes had roof damage, and multiple tree limbs were snapped.						
EF0	N of Eram	Okmulgee	OK	35.622°N 95.787°W	12:25–12:29	3.1 mi (5.0 km)	250 yd (230 m)
EF0	Large tree limbs were broken and the roof of a house was slightly damaged.						
EF1	NW of Eufaula	McIntosh	OK	35.301°N 95.622°W	12:33–12:34	0.7 mi (1.1 km)	150 yd (140 m)
EF1	A low-end EF1 tornado damaged outbuildings and homes. Several trees were downed as well.						
EF0	ESE of Checotah	McIntosh	OK	35.438°N 95.458°W	12:51–12:53	1.6 mi (2.6 km)	150 yd (140 m)
EF0	The roof of a barn was blown off, a home had its roof damaged, and numerous large tree limbs were snapped.						
EF1	NNE of Winnsboro to N of Pittsburg	Franklin, Camp	TX	33.0033°N 95.2739°W	13:15–13:35	18.44 mi (29.68 km)	858 yd (785 m)
EF1	This tornado began north of Winnsboro and moved east, snapping or uprooting many trees and causing significant damage to a fire department building, which had most of its metal roof panels removed. A house had much of its roof blown off, a manufactured home suffered roof and wall damage, a church lost a small part of its roof, and an outbuilding had roof damage as well. As it continued eastward, the tornado downed more trees and damaged homes and outbuildings. At a campground near Lake Bob Sandlin, an outbuilding was destroyed, two RVs were overturned, and three occupants were injured. After crossing the lake, the tornado caused sporadic tree damage before lifting near the Camp/Titus county line.						
EF1	SW of Omaha to SSE of Naples	Morris	TX	33.103°N 94.8072°W	13:44–13:55	8.98 mi (14.45 km)	735 yd (672 m)
EF1	A low-end EF1 tornado uprooted numerous trees and broke large branches.						
EF1	S of Avery to NW of New Boston	Red River, Bowie	TX	33.4345°N 94.7749°W	13:47–14:07	18.58 mi (29.90 km)	850 yd (780 m)
EF1	This tornado lifted the roof off of a shed shortly after it touched town and caused tree damage as it moved to the east-northeast. Trees were snapped and a couple of outbuildings were damaged or destroyed in and around the rural communities of New Hope and Hubbard. Near US 82, the tornado destroyed a shed and overturned some trailers before it lifted.						
EF1	N of Naples to Southern New Boston	Bowie	TX	33.3404°N 94.7073°W	13:51–14:09	18.87 mi (30.37 km)	580 yd (530 m)
EF1	A high-end EF1 QLCS tornado caused extensive tree damage along its path, uprooting or snapping trees and downing power lines. It removed the metal roof of a house, destroyed a large metal outbuilding at the Barry Telford Unit prison, and overturned three nearby camper trailers. The tornado continued northeast, causing tree damage and downing tree limbs in the southern portion of New Boston before dissipating.						
EF1	Eastern Scottsville	Harrison	TX	32.5412°N 94.2378°W	14:46–14:47	1.04 mi (1.67 km)	100 yd (91 m)
EF1	Trees were snapped or uprooted on the east side of Scottsville.						
EF1	NNE of Waskom to WSW of Blanchard	Caddo	LA	32.5589°N 94.0328°W	15:00–15:04	3.9 mi (6.3 km)	114 yd (104 m)
EF1	A small metal truss communications tower and pump station were bent in half, and several trees were snapped or uprooted.						
EF1	Northern Shreveport	Caddo	LA	32.5664°N 93.7831°W	15:19–15:20	0.82 mi (1.32 km)	225 yd (206 m)
EF1	This brief tornado occurred in the northern part of Shreveport, where it removed a few metal roof panels from an outbuilding, snapped a few trees, and downed large tree limbs.						
EF1	NW of Woodville	Tyler	TX	30.8225°N 94.4954°W	15:49–15:52	0.51 mi (0.82 km)	75 yd (69 m)
EF1	A brief tornado touched down near US 287, destroying an outbuilding and snapping trees. It damaged a home, which had portion of its roofing peeled off and also had wooden two-by-fours impaled into its roof.						
EF1	NE of Dubberly to WSW of Athens	Claiborne	LA	32.6138°N 93.163°W	16:06–16:07	1.82 mi (2.93 km)	300 yd (270 m)
EF1	Numerous trees and power poles were snapped by this high-end EF1 tornado. A few trees fell onto and damaged structures.						
EF1	ESE of Pineland to SE of Hemphill	Sabine	TX	31.206°N 93.824°W	16:29–16:36	5.58 mi (8.98 km)	625 yd (572 m)
EF1	This tornado touched down in the Sabine National Forest, snapping and uprooting numerous softwood trees. It continued northeast through inaccessible forested areas, crossing SH 87 before lifting within a cove at the Toledo Bend Reservoir.						
EF1	N of Almadane	Vernon	LA	30.9795°N 93.4962°W	17:01–17:03	1.06 mi (1.71 km)	100 yd (91 m)
EF1	A tornado touched down east of LA 111, where minor tree damage occurred and a structure had roofing torn off. It continued to the northeast, snapping several trees and causing additional tree damage in inaccessible areas.						
EFU	Fort Polk	Vernon	LA	31.0876°N 93.1643°W	17:27–17:30	2.24 mi (3.60 km)	10 yd (9.1 m)
EFU	Downed trees were reported in an inaccessible area. Satellite imagery will be used to assess further damage.						
EF1	Boyce	Rapides, Grant	LA	31.3777°N 92.6978°W	17:50–17:57	3.38 mi (5.44 km)	100 yd (91 m)
EF1	This tornado began in a field southwest of I-49, removing power lines from transmission towers. The tornado then crossed the interstate and moved into Boyce, where it damaged several homes, destroyed outbuildings, and caused varying degrees of tree damage in town. It then crossed the Red River into Grant Parish, damaging some trees before quickly lifting.						
EF1	ESE of Kelly	Caldwell	LA	31.9526°N 92.1085°W	18:10–18:11	0.44 mi (0.71 km)	200 yd (180 m)
EF1	Numerous trees were snapped or uprooted. A large hay barn lost most of its roof, and a single-family home sustained minor roof damage.						
EF1	ENE of Donaldsonville	Ascension	LA	30.1121°N 90.9584°W	22:52–22:53	0.30 mi (0.48 km)	50 yd (46 m)
EF1	Four homes were damaged and had parts of their roofs removed. Front porch pillars were moved or ripped away, a garage door was blown in, and fences were damaged as well.						
EF0	Gramercy	St. James	LA	30.0674°N 90.6986°W	23:17–23:18	0.29 mi (0.47 km)	75 yd (69 m)
EF0	Some homes in Gramercy had minor roof damage, and fences were also damaged.						
EF2	NW of Waynesboro	Wayne	MS	31.6904°N 88.7855°W	00:24–00:32	3.98 mi (6.41 km)	150 yd (140 m)
EF2	This strong tornado began in a forested area to the east of Whistler, rapidly intensifying as it crossed US 84, where it rolled a vehicle and destroyed several chicken houses. It quickly reached peak intensity as large tree trunks were snapped, a manufactured home was completely destroyed after being thrown over 50 yd (46 m), and a house was heavily damaged and had half of its roof torn off. A UTV was thrown 25 yd (23 m) into the house, and an outdoor kitchen on the property was destroyed. Farther along the path, another manufactured home was rolled and destroyed, a house had major roof damage, and a pickup truck was lofted and dropped 20 yd (18 m) away. The tornado then weakened and caused additional minor damage to trees and a manufactured home before dissipating in a forested area. Four people were injured. This tornado occurred near the same area that was impacted by an EF3 tornado the previous month on February 12.						
EF1	NW of Agricola	George	MS	30.8415°N 88.5696°W	01:55–01:56	0.92 mi (1.48 km)	30 yd (27 m)
EF1	A farm building was destroyed, a large outbuilding was rolled off its foundation, and a couple of trees were snapped or uprooted.						
EF1	S of Ironton to NW of Pointe à la Hache	Plaquemines	LA	29.5576°N 89.9547°W	02:13–02:20	5.49 mi (8.84 km)	75 yd (69 m)
EF1	A high-end EF1 tornado caused significant to buildings at a camp near Lake Laurier. It then weakened, damaging a few trees before lifting.						
EF1	Port Sulphur	Plaquemines	LA	29.52°N 89.73°W	02:33–02:37	2.88 mi (4.63 km)	50 yd (46 m)
EF1	This tornado quickly developed near LA 23, blowing over power poles in Port Sulphur before crossing the Mississippi River. Numerous trees were visibly damaged on high resolution satellite imagery across the river with a faint damage path continuing into the marsh thereafter. The end point of this tornado is estimated by radar and high resolution satellite imagery.						
EF0	Eastern Woodlawn Beach	Santa Rosa	FL	30.3984°N 86.974°W	05:06–05:07	0.32 mi (0.51 km)	75 yd (69 m)
EF0	A high-end EF0 tornado caused minor shingle damage to several homes on the east side of Woodlawn Beach, destroyed a metal awning, and overturned an RV along its path. Another RV was lifted and tossed approximately 50 yd (46 m) before the tornado dissipated.						

=== March 5 event ===
List of confirmed tornadoes – Wednesday, March 5, 2025
EF#	Location	County / Parish	State	Start Coord.	Time (UTC)	Path length	Max width
EF1	Northwestern Unionville	Union	NC	35.088°N 80.577°W	13:34–13:37	2.25 mi (3.62 km)	75 yd (69 m)
EF1	This tornado began on the Porter Ridge High School campus, damaging a tennis court, collapsing two storage sheds, and snapping tree branches and a light pole. The tornado then damaged a house under construction, ripping part of its roof off. Farther along the path, another house suffered minor structural damage and numerous trees were uprooted or snapped. Several wooden power poles were snapped before the tornado lifted to the west of US 601.						
EF0	SE of Almondsville	Gloucester	VA	37.387°N 76.645°W	20:39–20:40	0.35 mi (0.56 km)	75 yd (69 m)
EF0	A waterspout moved onshore from the York River, downing several large trees, displacing a large propane tank several hundred feet, and damaging a pillar and shingles on a cottage.						

== See also ==
- Tornadoes of 2025
- List of North American tornadoes and tornado outbreaks
