= Tornado (bull) =

American bucking bull (1957-1972)

- ProRodeo Hall of Fame bull
- Breed: Braford
- Sex: Bull
- Born: 1957; Texas, U.S.
- Died: 1972 (aged 14–15); Henryetta, Oklahoma, U.S.
- Nationality: United States
- Years active: 1960 - 1969
- Owner: Jim Shoulders
- Weight: 1850 lb (840 kg)
- Appearance: Red with a White Face
- Awards: Bucking Bull of the NFR 1962 - 1965

Tornado was an American bucking bull. He went to the National Finals Rodeo (NFR) at least four times. He was voted Bull of the NFR four times consecutively from 1962 to 1965. Owned by rodeo champion Jim Shoulders, Tornado was named the "meanest bull alive" at the NFR four times. Tornado is best known for his matchup with ProRodeo Hall of Fame bull rider, Freckles Brown, which is most often referred to as "The Ride." It was Brown who, in 1967, broke Tornado's undefeated streak of 220 buckoffs in six years. Tornado, Brown, and Shoulders all have been recorded in The Encyclopedia of Oklahoma History and Culture maintained online by the Oklahoma Historical Society. Tornado was inducted into the ProRodeo Hall of Fame 1979 and the Bull Riding Hall of Fame in 2016.

== Background ==
Tornado was born in 1957 in Texas. The cowboy, bull rider and stock contractor Jim Shoulders, of Henryetta, Oklahoma, owned and managed the bull; Shoulders actually maintained several quality bucking stock, which included the other "weather" bulls Cyclone, Hurricane, and Twister. According to Frank Boggs, an Oklahoman sports writer and columnist, Shoulders bought Tornado in South Texas when the bull was three years old. Tornado was a Brahma-Hereford crossbred bull, known as a Braford that generally weighed 1,850 pounds. He was described as red with a white face. Tornado first started bucking in Mesquite, Texas, in 1960.

== Career ==
From Tornado's first rodeo in Mesquite, Texas, in 1960 through to the NFR in December 1967, he was undefeated, bucking off the toughest cowboys. There was a sign outside his pen at Shoulder's ranch in Henryetta: "Warning: Enter at Your Own Risk." Shoulders declared that outside of the arena Tornado was tame, and he "often walked up to Tornado in the pasture to pet him or feed him grass". However, in the arena, "Tornado transformed into a holy terror".

Tornado bucked on the Rodeo Cowboys Association (RCA) circuit. He qualified for the NFR every year from 1962 through 1967 and perhaps more. For those four years, he was the top-ranked bull on the bucking-stock list. For the first 220 attempts to ride him for a qualified ride, he remained undefeated. In addition to typical bucking abilities such as jumping, kicking, and spinning, Tornado also possessed something labeled "clown-and-barrel fighting ability." His name came from his ability to quickly alter the direction of his spin. However, he used just enough energy as he needed to buck off the level of rider on him. Another hall of fame bull, Red Rock was known for using this strategy, and he was undefeated for his entire PRCA career of 309 attempts.

Tornado was sometimes referred to as "unrideable" by the cowboys. He was finally defeated in a famous ride with Brown. Cowboy songwriter and singer Red Steagall captured "The Ride" in his song "The Ballad of Freckles Brown." Tornado (and Brown) are now documented in the Encyclopedia of Oklahoma History and Culture maintained online by the Oklahoma Historical Society.

"His reputation had not been gained smelling flowers. He was rodeo’s orneriest critter, a massive assembly of muscles and guts and powerful old bones."
— rodeo journalist Frank Boggs

For four of his trips to the NFR, Tornado was voted the Bull of the NFR and named "The Meanest Bull Alive." Rodeo photographer Ferrell Butler, explained "If you didn’t get out of there, he’d camp onto you something fierce. Then he’d go wipe out the barrel." Jim Shoulders’ wife Sharon said she did not consider him vicious; she believed that he “sized up” his riders, having noticed that he bucked harder with top riders than he did for locals.

Halfway through his bucking career, in 1965, Shoulders put Tornado up for a $500 prize to anyone who could ride him at the 101 Wild West Ranch Rodeo. The offer was open to anyone, not just bull riders, as long as they were of legal age. No one won the prize. At the NFR in 1967 in Oklahoma City, Oklahoma, ProRodeo Hall of Fame bull rider Myrtis Dightman tried to ride Tornado but failed. After "The Ride," with Freckles Brown, Tornado was ridden four more times, once by Brown, and also by three other riders for a total of five qualified rides. The second time Brown rode him was in Miami, Florida.

=== The Ride ===
On December 1, 1967, at the NFR in Oklahoma City, Oklahoma, approximately 9,000 fans gathered in the Oklahoma State Fair Arena to watch 47-year-old Freckles Brown, the 1962 PRCA World Champion Bull Rider, attempt to ride Tornado. Brown had been studying the bull’s performance at many rodeos. However, his odds of success were considered to be slim: he was older than the typical cowboy and had gotten surgery on his neck.

The two were loaded into chute #2. After they were introduced, there was a great silence in the arena. Then Tornado exploded out of the gate, and Brown's eyes were fixed on his shoulders. Butler snapped his first of two iconic photographs. One of two photographs, of which one would be lost. Tornado spun right with Brown following. "I got over there to the right," Brown recalled. "Maybe just a hair too far. I straightened up and he spun three or four times." For about four or five seconds Brown hung on. The crowd was cheering. "People were screamin' and hollerin'," Butler said. "I never heard it so loud in that place before." For a split second Brown felt worried. "I just got behind him a little bit," he said. "I throwed my foot out there, got my head back in there and did all right. You can feel it. It may not look like you were in a storm, but you can tell it when you're riding." Brown was close to making history. "I just felt real good," Brown said. "I got where I wanted to be, and that's the first time I got exactly where I wanted to be. Sometimes you don't feel that way. Sometimes out there, about the third or fourth round if they're bucking, you feel like you can ride him regardless of what he does, but not very often. It was just before the whistle when I felt like I had him rode.

Later, Brown said "the crowd was so loud that he couldn't hear the whistle. However, he knew when the clowns moved in that he had successfully ridden the bull." The chute they had used was later exhibited in the office of the Chamber of Commerce.

Tornado was 11 years old by this time, yet he was still considered the most challenging bull. "Tornado had such a reputation that most cowboys were thrown before they even got on him," says former state senator and Oklahoma Congressman Clem McSpadden, general manager of the NFR that year. "But the bull was at a point in its career where it was fit to be ridden. Freckles got on him, bore down and ended up riding him pretty easy".

"Radio icon Paul Harvey regaled a national audience for several minutes with details of Freckles Brown's historic ride on the fearsome Tornado. The publicity did wonders for the professional rodeo circuit." Butler noticed that before "The Ride", there would be modest crowds on the weekends, saying "we couldn't get enough people in an arena to start a cussin' fight", but afterwards, he saw crowd size increase noticeably.

== Retirement and death ==
Tornado was retired after the end of the 1968 rodeo season, to Shoulders' J Lazy S Ranch in Oklahoma. Shoulders stated that "He enjoyed his prestigious position at the ranch and made it a point to attract attention when strangers were around by bellowing and throwing dirt – almost as though he wanted all to know he was still a champion". Tornado died in spring 1972.

Shoulders died in 2007, but his wife Sharon loved to reminisce about him and Tornado, for example the cookies her two youngest daughters hand-fed Tornado while Jim was out touring. She claimed Tornado was "docile and gentle" in the pasture, and still and relaxed in the chute until it was go time. "He'd just stand there; he'd look out between the chute boards, almost like he was sizing up what he was going to do".

Tornado is buried at the National Cowboy and Western Heritage Museum in Oklahoma City, Oklahoma, near the graves of two notable bucking horses. Apparently 18 acres at the museum are set aside for burial memorials of notable rodeo animals. To date, there have only been four animals buried there: Tornado, two notable bucking horses (Midnight and Five Minutes Til Midnight), and the museum's Longhorn mascot, Abilene. Tornado's spot has a huge memorial plaque with a dedication. It appears on the Waymarking website.

=== Honors ===
- Has his own entry in The Encyclopedia of Oklahoma History and Culture maintained online by the Oklahoma Historical Society
- The NFR entry in The Encyclopedia of Oklahoma History and Culture mentions the match between Tornado and Freckles Brown
- 1979 ProRodeo Hall of Fame
- 2016 Bull Riding Hall of Fame
- Voted "Bull of the NFR" at the NFR 1962-1965
- Named the "Meanest Bull Alive" at the NFR four times
