= The Fighting Parson =

The Fighting Parson may refer to:

== People ==
- William Gannaway Brownlow (1805–1877), Tennessee preacher and politician
- James Caldwell, American Presbyterian minister and supporter of the American Revolution
- John M. Chivington, American Methodist pastor who served as colonel in the United States Volunteers during the Colorado War and the New Mexico Campaigns of the American Civil War
- Fountain E. Pitts, American Methodist pastor, Confederate chaplain and colonel in the American Civil War
- Joseph Roby, American Congregationalist minister and supporter of the American Revolution
- Pleasant Tackitt, American politician, pioneer Methodist minister, stockman, teacher, farmer, Indian fighter and Confederate Officer
- Frederick Wedge, American boxer and clergyman
- John Steele (1715–1779), American Revolutionary War-era Pennsylvania
- Andrew Jackson Potter (1830–1895), American circuit rider, soldier, and drover

== Films ==
- The Fighting Parson, a 1930 film starring Harry Langdon
- The Fighting Parson, a 1933 film starring Hoot Gibson

== Theater ==
- The Fighting Parson, a play by Marty Gervais based on the life of Leslie Spracklin

== Sports teams ==
- A former nicknamed used by University of Denver athletic teams
