= Texas Trail of Fame =

Texas cowboy hall of fame

- Established: 1997
- Location: 130 E. Exchange Avenue, Fort Worth, Texas, 76164
- Type: Hall of fame
- Website: texastrailoffame.org

The Texas Trail of Fame is a cowboy hall of fame in Fort Worth, Texas. Established in 1997, the building is located at 130 E. Exchange Avenue, in the Fort Worth Stockyards National Historic District of the city.

The hall honors individuals who have contributed to the Western way of life. Bronze markers have been installed for each inductee. The markers are designed to resemble a frontier marshal's badge and each is inscribed with an inductee's name. New inductees are honored annually during ceremonies at the Red Steagall Cowboy Gathering and Western Swing Festival.

== Inductees ==
=== 1990s ===
1997

- J. Frank Dobie
- Will Rogers
- Roy Rogers
- Sid W. Richardson
- Bill Pickett
- Quanah Parker
- José Antonio Navarro
- Walt Matthews
- Tad Lucas
- Oliver Loving
- Justin Boots
- Bose Ikard
- Charles Goodnight
- Dale Evans
- Amon G. Carter
- Samuel Burk Burnett

1998

- Bob Wills
- K. M. Van Zandt
- Christopher Slaughterford
- Juan Seguín
- George W. Saunders
- Frederic Remington
- Annie Oakley
- Richard King
- Sam Houston
- Zane Grey
- Gene Autry
- Stephen F. Austin

1999

- Sue McCafferty
- Charlie McCafferty
- John Ware
- William Thomas Waggoner
- Red Steagall
- Windy Ryon
- Charles Marion Russell
- Theodore Roosevelt
- Ruth Roach
- Steve Murrin
- Pawnee Bill Lillie
- Robert J. Kleberg
- Holt Hickman
- Charles French
- Davy Crockett
- Samuel Colt
- Buffalo Bill
- Jesse Chisholm
- Dolph Briscoe

=== 2000s ===
2000

- Lewis and Clark
- Ernest Tubb
- Deaf Smith
- Sacagawea
- Nat Love
- Elmer Kelton
- Will James
- John Coffee Hays
- Amanda Burk
- James Bowie
- James Beckwourth

2001

- Yakima Canutt
- William B. Travis
- Edward H. Tarrant
- Sons of the Pioneers
- Luke Short
- Bat Masterson
- Jane Herbert Wilkinson Long
- Herb Jeffries
- John Ford
- Wyatt Earp
- Lorenzo de Zavala
- Kit Carson

2002

- Jay Silverheels
- Lawrence Sullivan Ross
- Tex Ritter
- Clayton Moore
- John O. Meusebach
- M. L. Leddy
- Lady Bird Johnson
- Wild Bill Hickok
- Jim Courtright
- Calamity Jane
- Roy Bean
- Ripley A. Arnold

2003

- Jim Shoulders
- Cynthia Ann Parker
- Bob Moorhouse
- Tom Mix
- Miller Brothers 101 Ranch
- Louis L'Amour
- Britt Johnson
- Ben Johnson
- Susanna Dickinson
- Will S. Davis

2004

- Jim Wright
- Leon White
- John Wayne
- W. R. “Billy Bob” Watt
- Old Blue
- Audie Murphy
- Enid Justin
- John Graves
- Jerry Diaz
- Chief Joseph

2005

- Peta Nocona
- William A. A. Wallace
- Mitzi Lucas Riley
- Larry Mahan
- Jim Lane
- Cleo Hearn
- Julian Osgood Field
- George “Press” Farmer

2006

- Hank Thompson
- H. Allen Short
- Tom Bailey Saunders
- Midnight
- Charles McFarlane
- Don Edwards
- E. M. Daggett
- John Butterfield

2007

- Daniel Webster Wallace
- Gustavus Franklin Swift
- John Peter Smith
- Samuel “Booger Red” Privett Jr.
- Garlene Tindall Parris
- Chris LeDoux
- Adina Emilia De Zavala
- Mark Twain
- Edward Burleson
- Catherine Bryant Arnold

2008

- Buck Taylor
- William Wallace Simpson
- Randolph Scott
- Larry McMurtry
- Mirabeau B. Lamar
- George Glenn
- Clara Driscoll
- Bison

2009

- Oliver Winchester
- The Vaquero
- John B. Stetson
- Nolan Ryan
- Lillie Langtry
- Joseph Glidden
- Henry Ossian Flipper
- Jack Favor
- John Chisum

=== 2010s ===
2010

- Casey Tibbs
- Dean Smith
- Middleton Tate Johnson
- Johnny Gimble
- Neal Gay
- Commission Companies
- Choctaw Code Talkers
- Lynn Anderson

2011

- Leon Rausch
- Pam Minick
- Billy Minick
- Joseph McCoy
- Phil Lyne
- Quail Dobbs
- Henrietta King
- Superior Livestock Auction
- Texas Sesquicentennial Wagon Train
- Texas Declaration of Independence
- Anson Jones

2012

- Butch Cassidy
- Buckley Burton Paddock
- Bobbie Nelson
- Willie Nelson
- Sundance Kid
- Lyndon B. Johnson
- Temple Grandin
- Trevor Brazile
- Philip Danforth Armour
- Old Trail Drivers

2013

- William J. Worth
- Tumbleweed Smith
- Simon Farrar
- Satanta
- Rudy Warner Robbins
- Leon Coffee
- John Lomax
- Perry and Nancy Lee Bass
- Jim Thorpe
- Bass Reeves

2014

- Mary Fields
- Christer Segerliv
- Billy Dixon
- Mabel Strickland
- Lawrence Steel
- Joe Dulle
- James Farmer
- Horace Greeley
- Comanche Code Talkers
- Ben Tahmahkera
- Ben K. Green

2015

- Joseph Sterling Bridwell
- Graham H. Childress
- Álvar Núñez Cabeza de Vaca
- Five Civilized Tribes
- Southwestern Exposition and Livestock Show
- Fountain Goodlet Oxsheer
- James Hampton
- Stylle Reed
- Bob Simpson

2016

- John Barclay Armstrong
- Choctaw code talkers
- Great American Cattle Drive
- Frank Hamer
- Loyd Jinkens
- Leander H. McNelly
- North Fort Worth Historical Society
- Vicente Oropeza
- Mary D. and F. Howard Walsh Sr.
- Cathay Williams

2017

- Billy Bob Barnett
- Margaret Borland
- Wilson Franklin
- Johnny Fry
- Bruce Greene
- Donald Jury
- W. O. Rominger
- Eddie Sandoval
- Clint Walker

2018

- Robert Fuller
- Barry Corbin
- Douglas Harman
- Granville Woods
- Jeanette Sterns Keim
- Plenty Coups
- S. Omar Barker
- Benjamin Tyler Henry
- H.B. Baker

2019

- James Arness
- Marty Robbins
- John Smith
- Black Kettle
- Chuck DeHaan
- Mathew Caldwell
- True West Magazine
- Clay O'Brien Cooper
- James Drury

=== 2020s ===
2021

- Dave Bald Eagle
- John “Pete” Bonds
- Fort Worth Herd
- Lawson Daniel Gratz (Gratts)
- Keith Maddox
- Michael Martin Murphey
- Fess Parker
- George Strait
- Western Horseman Magazine
- George Westby

2022

- Robert Duvall
- Sam Elliott
- Geronimo
- Rebecca Tyler Lockhart
- Texas Rangers
- Jimmy Riscky
- Mollie Taylor Stevenson Jr. and Sr.
- Buster Welch
- William D. Wittliff

2023

- Asleep at the Wheel
- Mary Overton Burke
- John V. Farwell
- Molly Goodnight
- J. D. “Bob” and Almeady Jones
- Burl Washington
- Bob Watt Jr.
- Chuckwagon
- Taylor Sheridan

2024

- Jerry Baird
- Patrick Gottsch
- Arvol Looking Horse
- Paul W. McCallum
- Reba McEntire
- Charlie and Kit Montcrief
- Chuck Norris
- Dale Robertson
- Professor Richard Fillmore Selcer
- Leta G. Smothermon

2025

- Elaine Agather
- Mrs. Ninnie L. Baird
- Dan Blocker
- Lane Frost
- Walt Garrison
- Deb Haaland
- John T. Lytle
- Bobby Norris
- Sancho
- Samuel Hamilton Walker

== See also ==
- List of museums in North Texas
- National Cowboy and Western Heritage Museum in Oklahoma
