= Freckles (disambiguation) =

Freckles are clusters of concentrated melanin which are most often visible on people with a fair complexion.

Freckles may also refer to:

- Freckles (novel), a 1904 American novel
  - Freckles (1917 film), a 1917 film based on the novel
  - Freckles, a 1928 film based on the novel
  - Freckles (1935 film), a 1935 film based on the novel
  - Freckles (1960 film), a 1960 American film based on the novel
- Freckles Brown (1921–1987), American bull rider
- Calvin "Freckle" McMurray, a male feline character from the 2006 webcomic Lackadaisy
- "Freckles", a song by Eves Karydas, 2021
- "Freckles", a song by Natasha Bedingfield from the album Pocketful of Sunshine, 2007
- Freckles, a type of candy decorated with nonpareils

== See also ==
- Freckles and His Friends, a comic strip published in the US from the 1910s to the late 1970s
