= Thomas Jefferson Moore =

American cattleman, soldier and banker (1847–1911)

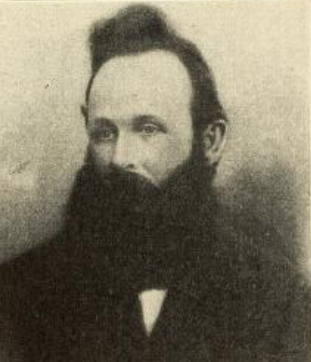
- Moore in a 1925 publication
- Born: March 31, 1847; Tuscaloosa County, Alabama, US
- Died: May 31, 1911 (aged 64); Llano, Texas, US
- Military career
- Allegiance: United States
- Unit: 32nd Texas Cavalry Regiment
- War: American Civil War
- Other work: Cattleman, banker

Thomas Jefferson Moore (March 31, 1847 – May 31, 1911) was an American cattleman, soldier and banker.

== Biography ==
Moore was born on March 31, 1847, in Tuscaloosa County, Alabama, to a Baptist family. He and his family moved to a farm near Seguin, Texas in 1855. During the American Civil War, from 1863 to 1865, he served in the 32nd Texas Cavalry Regiment. After the war, he joined the freight company his father also worked for. In the early 1870s, he drove cattle to northern markets, and owned a ranch by the late 1870s, near Llano, Texas. On August 10, 1875, he married Carrie Roberts, having one child together.

In 1889, Moore, John Blocker, John T. Lytle, and W. H. Jennings, pooled funds and jointly bought the 500,000-acre Piedra Blanca Ranch. Moore operated it from Llano. Moore became president of what is now Arrowhead Bank in the late 1890s. He died on May 31, 1911, in Llano, and is buried there.
