= Hubbard Independent School District =

Hubbard Independent School District may refer to:

- Hubbard Independent School District (Bowie County, Texas)
- Hubbard Independent School District (Hill County, Texas)
