= Lytle, Texas =

City in Atascosa, Bexar, and Medina counties in Texas, United States

- City
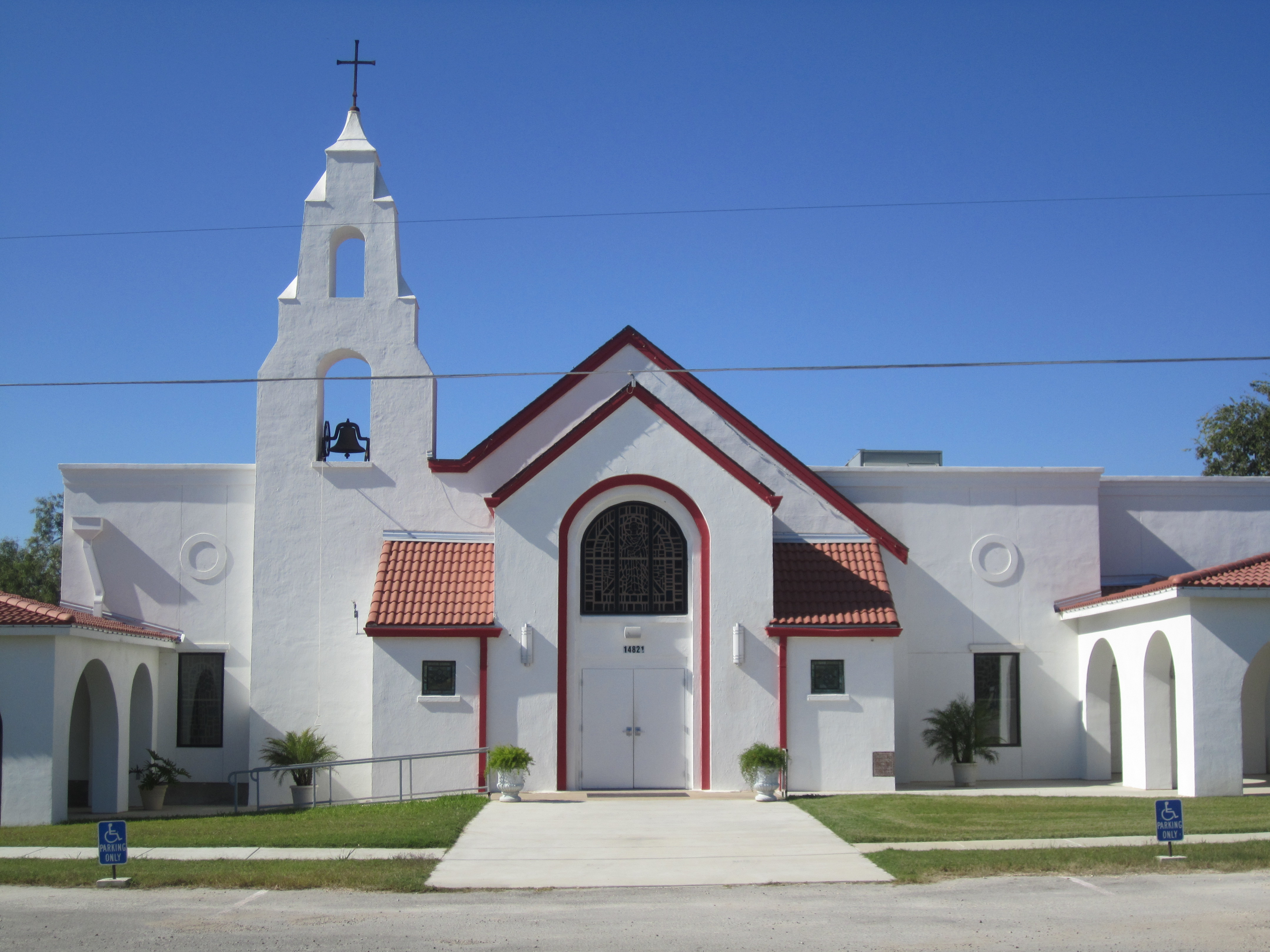
- St. Andrew the Apostle Catholic Church in Lytle
- Motto: A city on the grow!
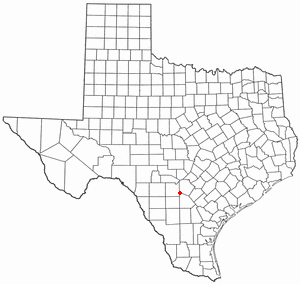
- Location of Lytle in Texas

- Location of Lytle in Atascosa County
- Coordinates: 29°14′03″N 98°47′42″W
- Country: United States
- State: Texas
- Counties: Atascosa, Medina, Bexar
- Established: December 8, 1948
- Named for: John T. Lytle

Area
  - Total: 4.81 sq mi (12.45 km^{2})
  - Land: 4.76 sq mi (12.33 km^{2})
  - Water: 0.046 sq mi (0.12 km^{2})
- Elevation: 715 ft (218 m)

Population (2020)
  - Total: 2,914
  - Density: 612.1/sq mi (236.3/km^{2})
- Time zone: UTC-6 (Central (CST))
  - Summer (DST): UTC-5 (CDT)
- ZIP code: 78052
- Area code: 830
- FIPS code: 48-45288
- GNIS feature ID: 2410903
- Website: www.lytletx.org

Lytle is a city in Atascosa, Bexar, and Medina counties in Texas, United States. The population was 2,914 at the 2020 census. It is part of the San Antonio metropolitan area.

== History ==
Lytle grew out of 321 acres (130 ha) located around the head of Atascosa Creek, patented to Henry Volkner in 1856. Volkner was the assignee of Mahan Matter, and the patent was signed by Elisha M. Pease, Governor of Texas. In 1870, Volkner sold the 321 acres for $175 to Fitch S. Adams. Lytle's first school was built on Adams' property with a verbal agreement that as long as the school building was there, the land it stood would belong to the school.

In 1881, officials from the International–Great Northern Railroad made an agreement with B. G. Andrews in which he was to give land for a new station ("Andrews Station"). There was some misunderstanding in making the deed, and the dispute ended with Mr. Andrews refusing to submit the property deed. Cattleman John T. Lytle then secured land some three miles southwest of Andrews Station, and one morning in 1882 railroad employees loaded Andrews Station on two flat cars, and moved it to the present site near the Lytle-McDaniel Ranch, which became known as Lytle or Lytle Station. When a post office was granted in 1883, the town also consisted of a general store, a bar, and a casketmaker named W. J. Garnand, who also became the first postmaster. An undated newspaper clipping entitled "Pioneer of Lytle" reads, "...W. J. Garnand was the first man to locate in the town of Lytle. That was in 1883. He was the first postmaster there and has been a leading citizen all the time."

In 1884, Lytle had a population of fifty and the town included a union church, a district school, a hotel, and a physician. By 1892, the population doubled and grew to include four general stores, two livestock breeders, and a Methodist church. Lytle's early settlers were primarily engaged in farming and raising cattle. Over time, Lytle became a major shipping point for cattle, and for years the old stock pens and loading chute were familiar landmarks until they were removed in the late 1960s and early 1970s. Cotton and corn were also two important crops, and cotton gins were located in both Lytle and in now-abandoned Benton City. In the late 1890s, coal mining also contributed to the local economy. By 1896, the population had risen to 150. By 1914, the town had grown to include telephone service, another general store, two lumberyards, and a weekly newspaper called The Herald, and the population had grown to 600. Lytle School had 127 students. During the Great Depression, the school was enlarged as part of a WPA project.

After World War II, the Chamber of Commerce raised enough money together with property owner participation to pave the streets. Later, a pitch by W. C. Loessberg and a group of volunteers led to the town being incorporated on October 27, 1951. On May 28, 1955, a bond election was passed to drill the Edwards well for city water service, and the Lytle Volunteer Fire Department was also founded that year. Another bond election passed to give the city a gas system in 1960, and a sewer system in 1961. More streets were paved in 1971, and a garbage removal and ambulance service were added in 1974. Since that time, the city has continued to grow.

== Geography ==
Lytle is located in the northern corner of Atascosa County. Most of the city lies in Atascosa County; only small portions extend into Bexar and Medina counties.

Interstate 35 passes through the southeastern part of the city, with access from Exit 131. Lytle's Main Street is Texas State Highway 132, following the route of the former U.S. Route 81 southwest to Natalia and Devine, before rejoining I-35. Downtown San Antonio is 25 miles (40 km) northeast via I-35, and Laredo is 133 miles (214 km) to the south.

According to the United States Census Bureau, the city has a total area of 4.5 square miles (12 km^{2}), of which 4.45 square miles (11.5 km^{2}) is land and 0.04 square miles (0.10 km^{2}) is water.

== Climate ==
The area's climate is characterized by hot, humid summers and generally mild to cool winters. According to the Köppen Climate Classification system, Lytle has a humid subtropical climate.

== Demographics ==
Historical population
Census	Pop.	Note	%±
1960	798		—
1970	1,298		62.7%
1980	1,920		47.9%
1990	2,255		17.4%
2000	2,383		5.7%
2010	2,492		4.6%
2020	2,914		16.9%
U.S. Decennial Census

=== 2020 census ===
As of the 2020 census, Lytle had a population of 2,914. The median age was 39.8 years; 25.5% of residents were under the age of 18 and 18.4% of residents were 65 years of age or older. For every 100 females there were 94.9 males, and for every 100 females age 18 and over there were 91.3 males age 18 and over.

There were 1,013 households in Lytle, of which 39.3% had children under the age of 18 living in them. Of all households, 48.8% were married-couple households, 16.3% were households with a male householder and no spouse or partner present, and 27.5% were households with a female householder and no spouse or partner present. About 20.8% of all households were made up of individuals and 8.5% had someone living alone who was 65 years of age or older.

There were 1,119 housing units, of which 9.5% were vacant. The homeowner vacancy rate was 2.0% and the rental vacancy rate was 7.1%.

0.0% of residents lived in urban areas, while 100.0% lived in rural areas.

Racial composition as of the 2020 census
Race	Number	Percent
White	1,635	56.1%
Black or African American	33	1.1%
American Indian and Alaska Native	22	0.8%
Asian	24	0.8%
Native Hawaiian and Other Pacific Islander	2	0.1%
Some other race	424	14.6%
Two or more races	774	26.6%
Hispanic or Latino (of any race)	2,004	68.8%

=== 2000 census ===
As of the census of 2000, there were 2,383 people, 811 households, and 633 families residing in the city. The population density was 593.4 inhabitants per square mile (229.1/km^{2}). There were 898 housing units at an average density of 223.6 units per square mile (86.3 units/km^{2}). The racial makeup of the city was 73.81% White, 0.46% African American, 0.92% Native American, 0.29% Asian, 0.04% Pacific Islander, 21.57% from other races, and 2.90% from two or more races. Hispanic or Latino of any race were 61.18% of the population. There were 811 households, out of which 39.6% had children under the age of 18 living with them, 60.8% were married couples living together, 13.6% had a female householder with no male householder present, and 21.9% were non-families. 19.9% of all households were made up of individuals, and 9.4% had someone living alone who was 65 years of age or older. The average household size was 2.94 and the average family size was 3.38.

In the city, the population was spread out, with 30.5% under the age of 18, 9.3% from 18 to 24, 26.6% from 25 to 44, 21.4% from 45 to 64, and 12.2% who were 65 years of age or older. The median age was 34 years. For every 100 females, there were 91.6 males. For every 100 females age 18 and over, there were 85.1 males.

The median income for a household in the city was $34,857, and the median income for a family was $40,699. Males had a median income of $27,734 versus $21,129 for females. The per capita income for the city was $14,826. About 15.0% of families and 16.6% of the population were below the poverty line, including 21.8% of those under age 18 and 20.0% of those age 65 or over.

== Education ==
The Lytle Independent School District serves almost all of Lytle and is home to the Lytle High School Pirates. A small sliver of Lytle (the portion in Bexar County) is served by the Southwest Independent School District. Another portion is in the Natalia Independent School District.

== In popular culture ==
English artist Cornelia Parker retrieved charcoal from a Baptist church which had been struck by lightning in Lytle and reassembled the pieces in her 1997 installation, Mass (Colder Darker Matter), which was displayed in the Frith Street Gallery in London, England.

== Gallery ==
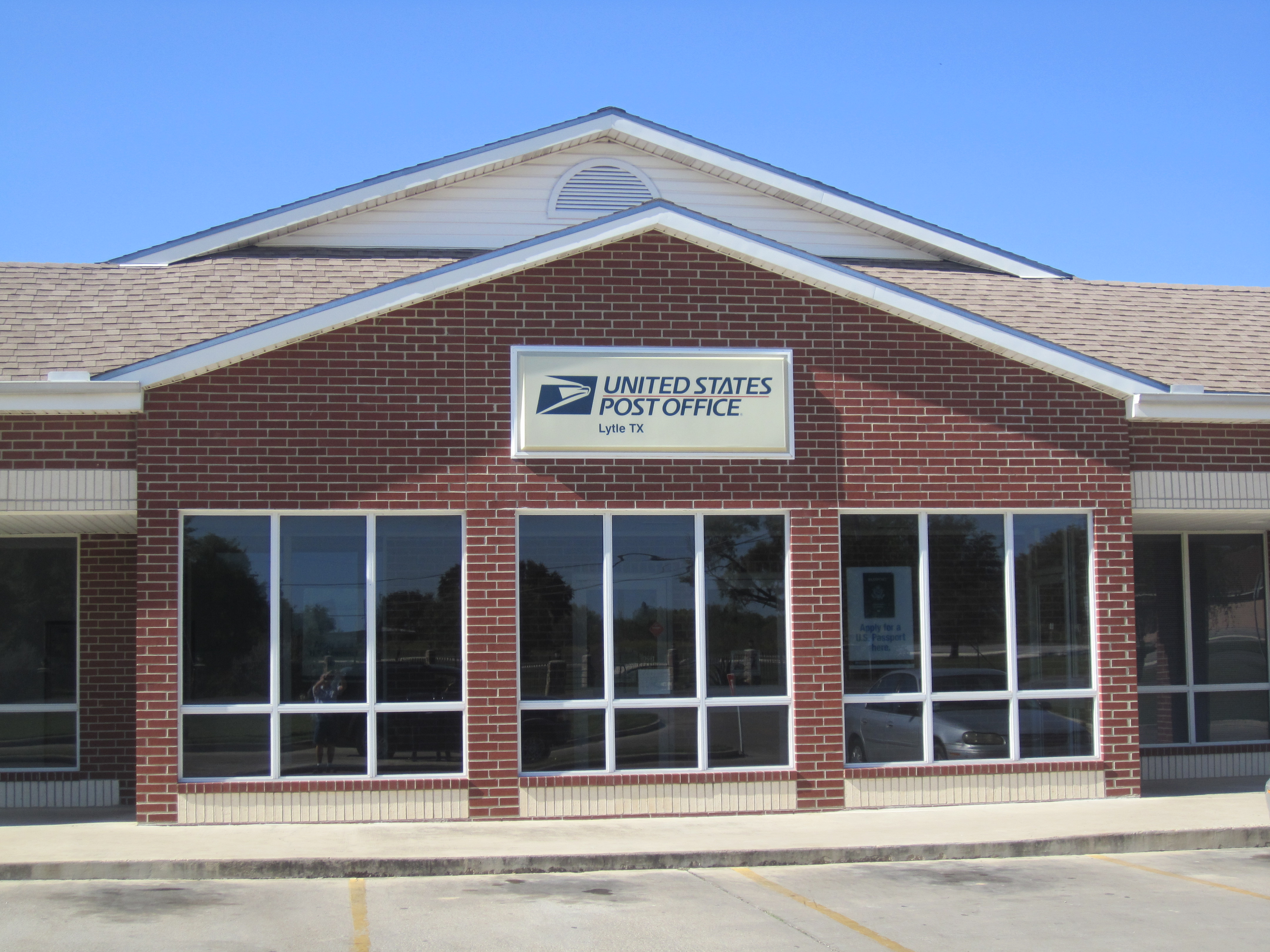
U.S. Post Office in Lytle

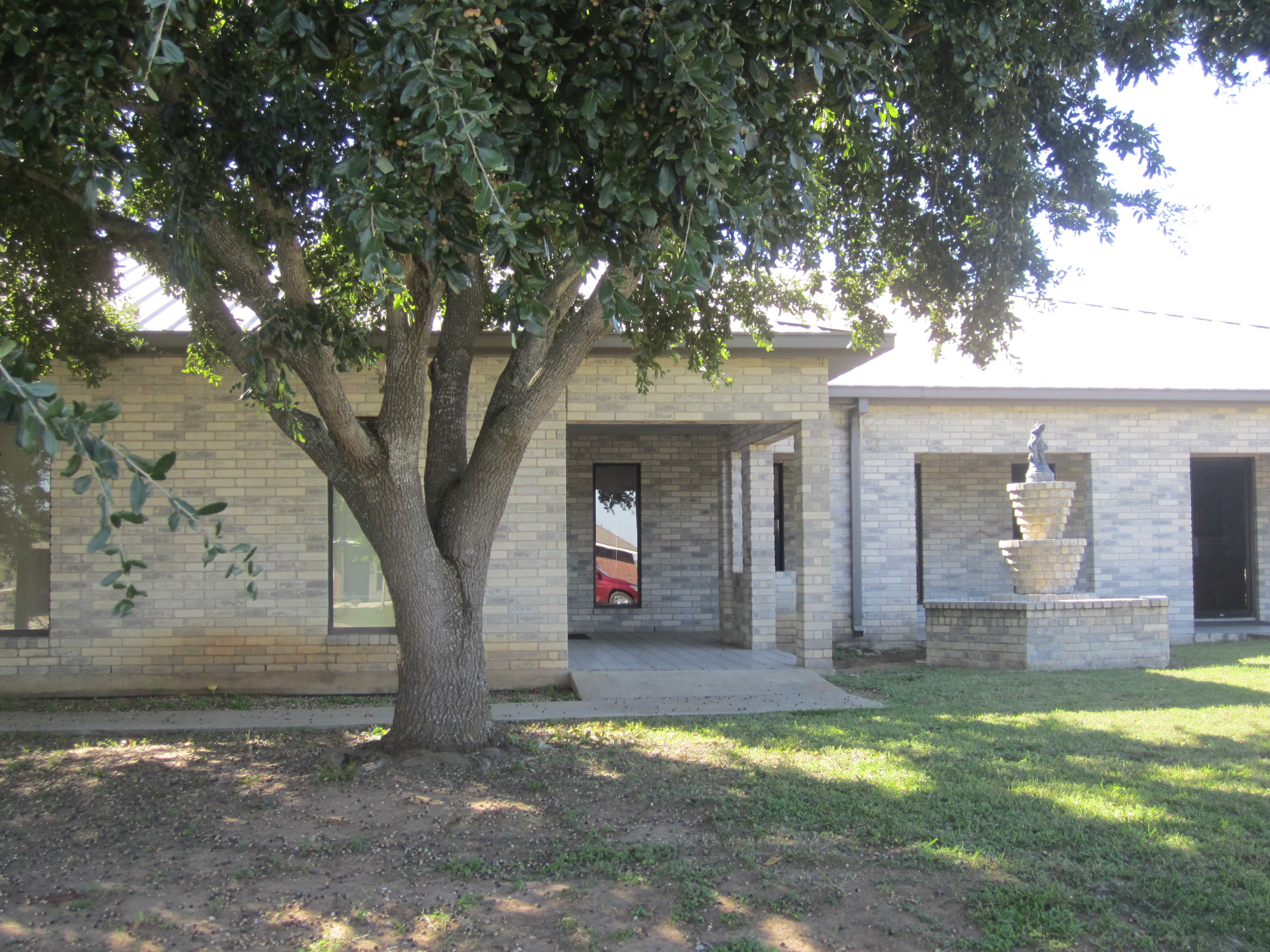
Lytle Community Center

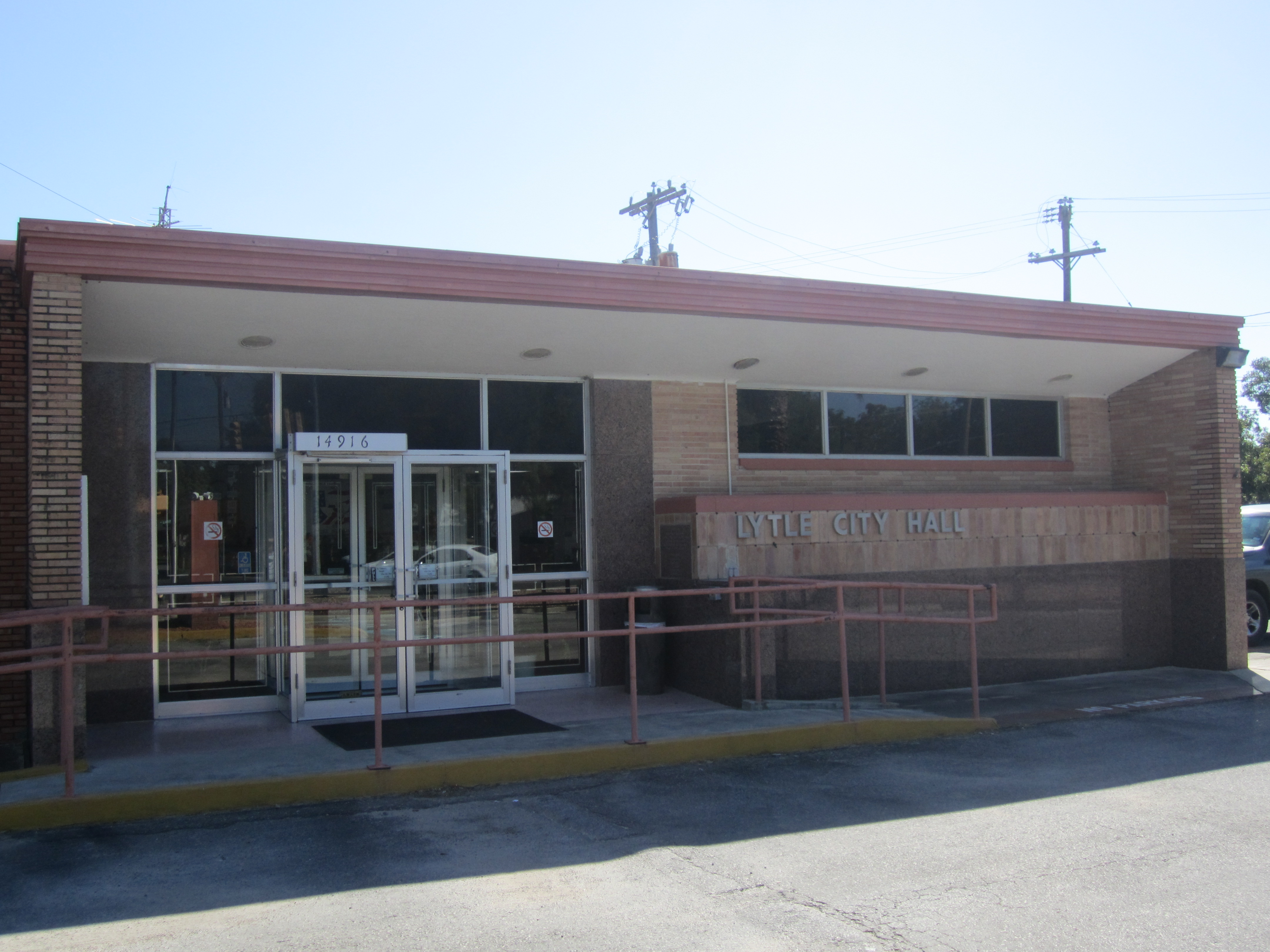
Lytle City Hall

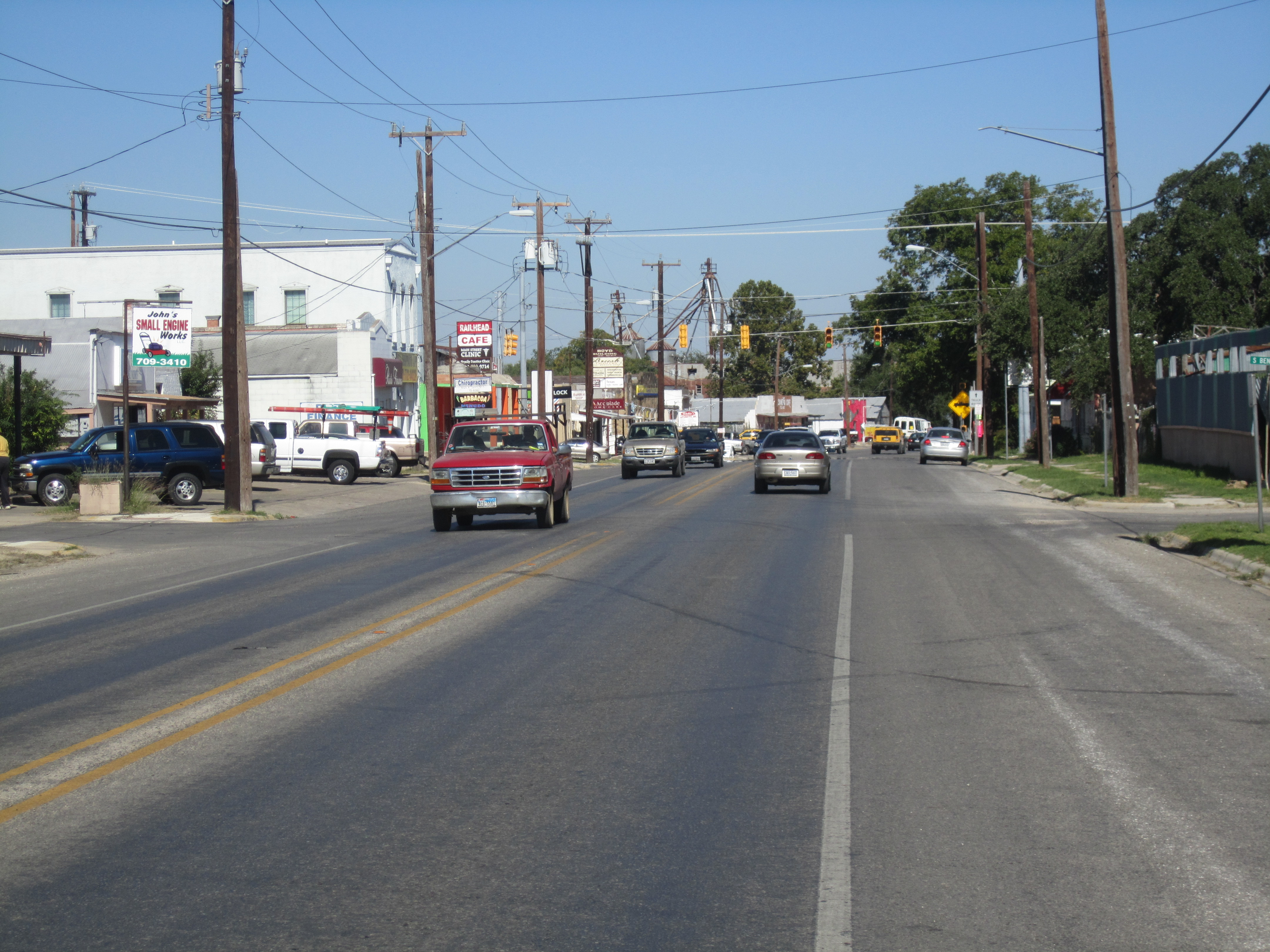
Downtown Lytle

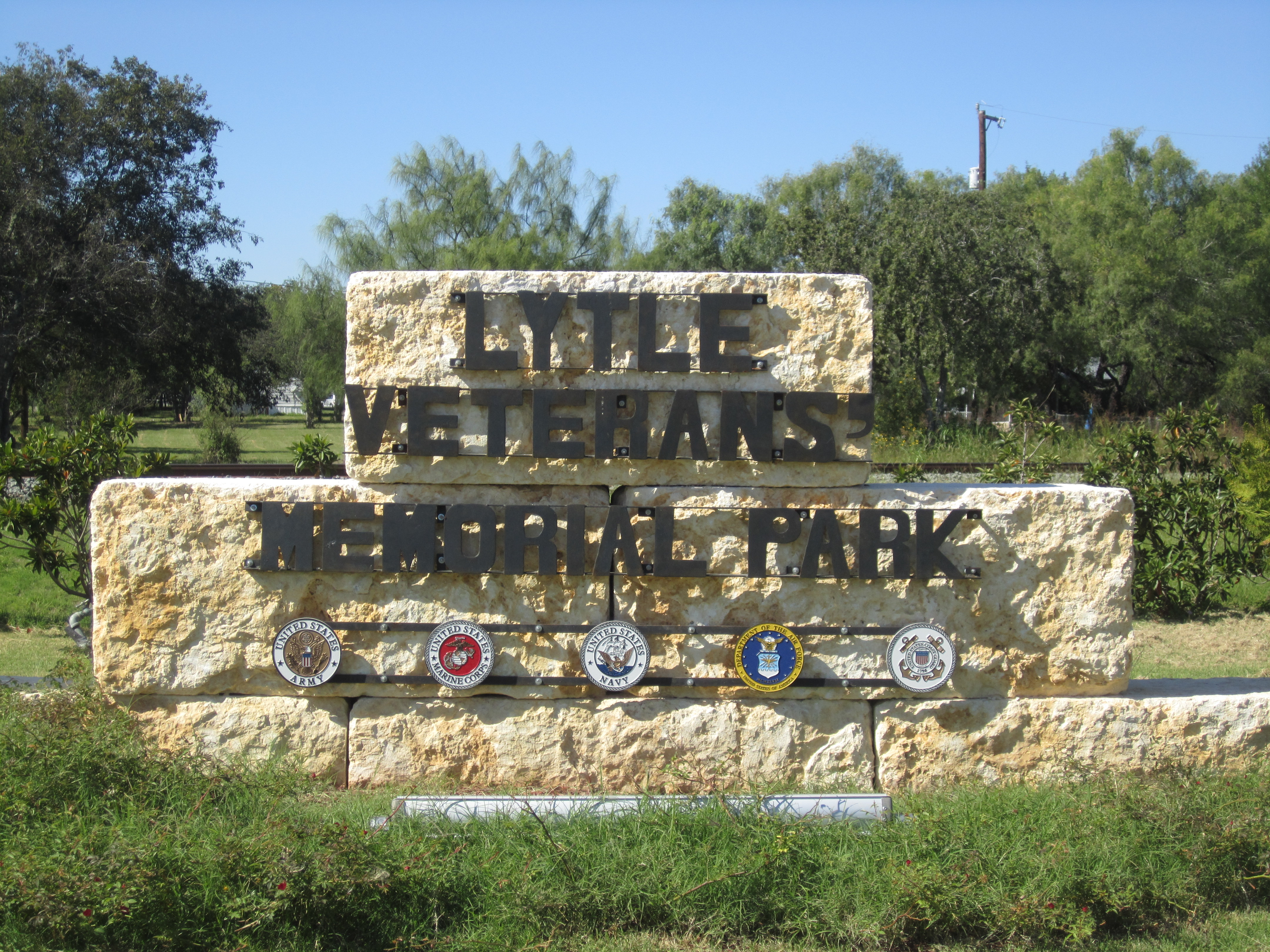
Veterans Memorial Park in Lytle

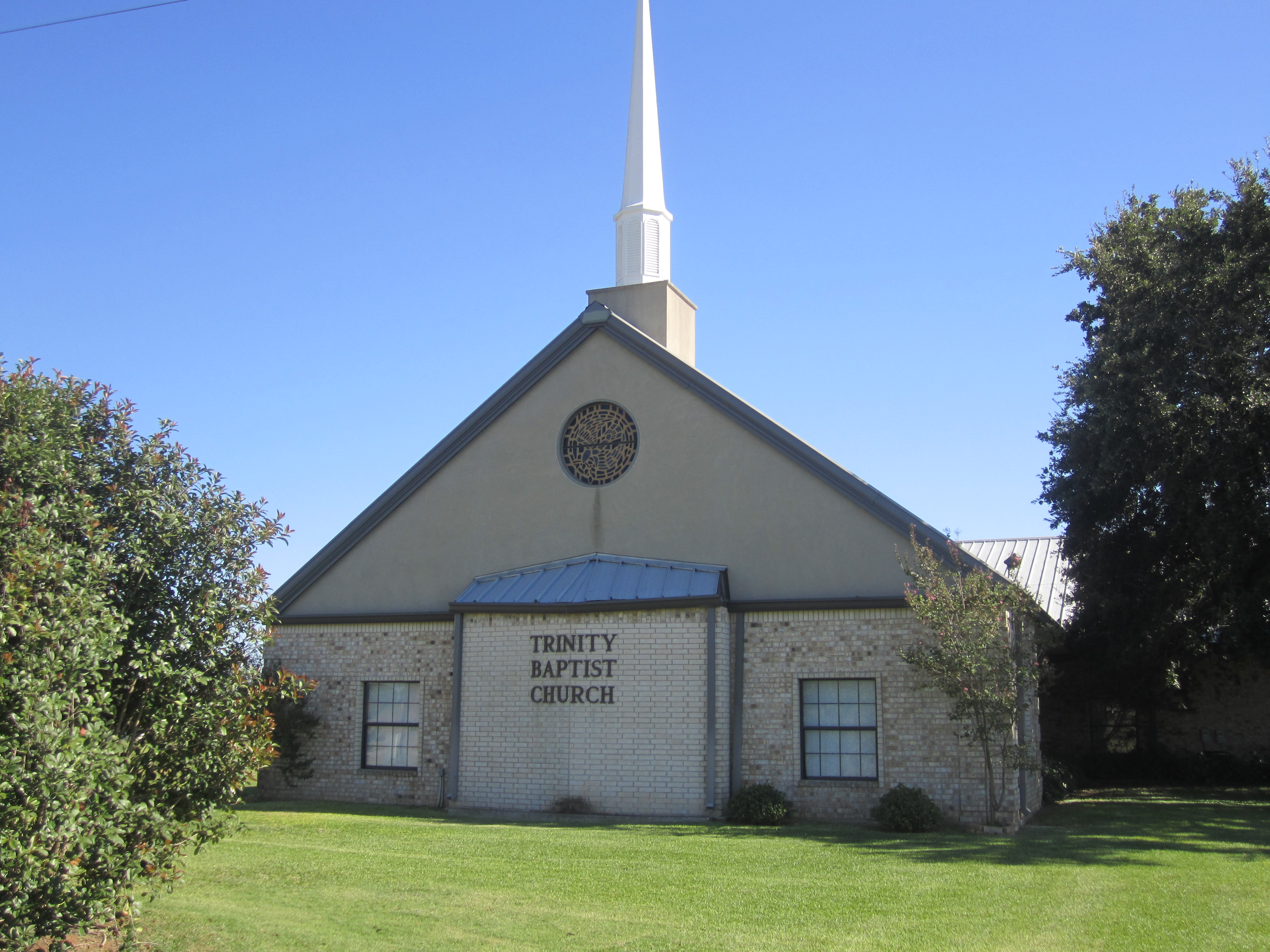
Trinity Baptist Church in Lytle

== See also ==
- List of municipalities in Texas
