= Potter-Blocker Trail =

Cattle trail in Texas, US

The Potter-Blocker Trail (sometimes called the Potter-Bacon Cutoff or Potter-Bacon Trail), was a cattle trail in Texas, United States. It was blazed by Jack Potter—son of Andrew Jackson Potter—c. 1883. It was a collateral branch of the Great Western Cattle Trail, but was shorter and crossed more unforgiving land. The trail went at least from Hebbronville, Texas up to Albany, intersecting the Western Trail at Alice.

It was likely never a widely utilized trail since by the time it sprang up in 1889 trail drives had fallen out of use as rail lines increasingly connected distant states with the rest of the country.
