= Warren G. Brown =

American rodeo cowboy (1921-1987)

Warren G. "Freckles" Brown
- Born: January 18, 1921; Wheatland, Wyoming, U.S.
- Died: March 20, 1987 (aged 66); Soper, Oklahoma, U.S.
- Awards: 1962 RCA World Champion bull rider

Warren Granger "Freckles" Brown (January 18, 1921 – March 20, 1987) was a hall of fame American rodeo cowboy from Wheatland, Wyoming. His career spanned from 1937 to 1974, competing in bull riding, saddle bronc riding, bareback bronc riding, team roping, and steer wrestling. He was the World Bull Riding Champion in 1962. Brown was inducted into the ProRodeo Hall of Fame in Colorado Springs, Colorado, for bull riding in 1979. He was also inducted into the inaugural class of the Bull Riding Hall of Fame in Fort Worth, Texas, in 2015. Brown was most famous for riding Tornado, who had an undefeated record of 220 riders. Brown was also a close friend and mentor of Lane Frost.

== Early career ==
Brown began competitive rodeo in Willcox, Arizona in 1937, at the age of 16. In 1941, he won his first bull riding trophy by riding his horse to Cody, Wyoming, before riding back again.

== World War II ==
Brown enlisted to join the U.S. army, and undertook basic training in Fort Sill. He studied horseshoeing while stationed at Fort Riley. He was recruited by the Office of Strategic Services (OSS) and "did his part by helping to train Chinese paratroopers in secret". The war ended in the summer of 1945, and Brown "returned to China to compete in a Red Cross-sponsored event in which U.S. pack mules were used in place of saddle-broncs and barebacks and native cattle were rounded up for bull riding. Brown left China with the all-around title".

== 1962 World Championship ==
Brown was injured badly in October 1962 at the rodeo in Portland, Oregon. While riding a bull name "Black Smoke" for 8 seconds, the bull flipped Brown, who fell on his head, paralyzing him. The doctor "pulled on his head and feeling returned to his right side and left foot". He was operated on and put in traction for 34 days, followed by a plaster cast "from his waist to the top of his brow for over 2 months". He had saved enough money to win the Championship. His earnings in 1962 were $18,675. Brown competed in the Professional Rodeo Cowboys Association (formerly the Rodeo Cowboys Association)..During that year he won the World Bull Riding Championship at the National Finals Rodeo (NFR) while he was on the sidelines watching.

== Tornado, the unrideable bull ==
Brown is remembered for riding an "unrideable" bull named Tornado in December 1967. The bull, owned by Jim Shoulders, had thrown over 200 riders over a 14-year period before Brown's successful ride, and was considered the ultimate challenge on the bull-riding circuit, but Brown stayed on for the 8 seconds required, in front of 6,000 people. Tornado died in 1972 as unridden by 220 professional riders except for Brown and two others, and was buried on the grounds of the National Cowboy & Western Heritage Museum, near two notable bucking horses, Midnight and Five Minutes Til Midnight. Brown, this ride, and Tornado are all memorialized in Red Steagall's song, "Freckles Brown".

== Awards and recognition ==
- 1962 West Best Cowboy (World Champion) Award
- 1972 For the 1971 Film/Television - Western Documentary - "Rodeo," Concepts Unlimited, Inc and Contemporary Films/McGraw Hill; Gaby Monet, Producer; Carroll Ballard, Director; Freckles Brown & Larry Mahan, Actors. Bronze Wrangler at the Western Heritage Awards of the National Cowboy & Western Heritage Museum
- 1979 ProRodeo Hall of Fame
- 1983 Brown received a trophy in 1983 that is in Denver for his "life long contribution to the sport of rodeo"
- 1986 Rodeo Hall of Fame of the National Cowboy and Western Heritage Museum
- 1993 Oklahoma Sports Hall of Fame
- 2006 Cheyenne Frontier Days Hall of Fame
- 2015 Bull Riding Hall of Fame
- 2017 Molalla Walk of Fame
- 2025 PBR Ring of Honor

== Personal life ==
He was the youngest of 10 brothers and sisters. Brown had a wife named Edith, and a daughter named Donna Harrison, and two grandchildren.

Brown had retired at age 53 to his 600-acre ranch in Soper, Oklahoma. Brown was found to have prostate cancer in November 1982. He was advised to go to Houston for radiation treatment, but was determined to go to the December finals beforehand, where a dance was held to raise funds to support his treatment. By March 1983 he had returned home to give interviews.

His cancer returned in 1987, after being in remission for four years. Another fundraiser was planned for March 1987, but Brown died two days before at his ranch in Soper, Oklahoma. The fund raiser went forward nevertheless and US$41,000 was raised to help with Brown's medical bills.

He was a friend and mentor to bull riding champion Lane Frost, who is buried near him in Mount Olivet Cemetery in Hugo, Oklahoma.
