= Andrew Jackson Potter =

American circuit rider, soldier and drover (1830–1895)

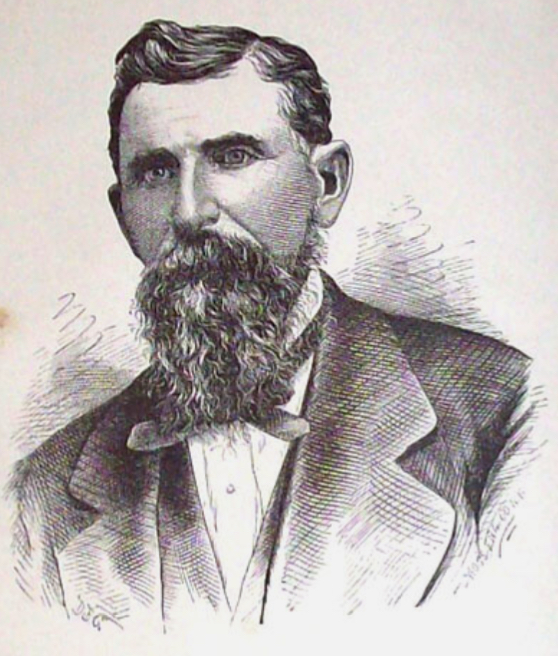
- Sketch of Potter in an 1882 publication
- Born: April 3, 1830; Chariton County, Missouri, US
- Died: October 21, 1895 (aged 65); Caldwell County, Texas, US
- Occupations: Circuit rider, soldier, drover
- Children: 14
- Military career
- Conflicts: Mexican–American War; American Civil War; Red River campaign

Andrew Jackson Potter (April 3, 1830 – October 21, 1895) was an American Methodist circuit rider, soldier, and drover.

== Early life ==
Potter was born on April 3, 1830, in Chariton County, Missouri, one of six children of Kentucky natives Joshua Potter—a War of 1812 veteran who died in 1840—and Martha Potter. He was named for president Andrew Jackson. As a teenager, he worked as a jockey, and won many races. He was known for his fearlessness, once stealing a gun from a man who hurt his daughter-in-law.

== Career, military service, and death ==
Potter enlisted and served under Sterling Price when the Mexican–American War began, and worked as a drover, physician at Fort Leavenworth, scout and soldier. During the American Civil War, he enlisted to the 36th Texas Cavalry Regiment February 1862 and served under Peter Cavanaugh Woods. He was later transferred to the 27th Texas Cavalry Regiment under Xavier Debray, and was also a chaplain for the regiment.

Potter prospected at the Chino mine, returning to San Antonio in 1852 and working as a firefighter. He married Emily C. Guin on August 23, 1853, and had 14 children together. He converted to Methodism in 1856 while working as a logger in Bastrop County, and became a licensed preacher after studying—a difficult task due to being undereducated.

In 1866, Potter was appointed a circuit pastor headquartered at a church in Prairie Lea, Texas, and preached around south-central Texas, travelling about 2,500 miles annually. In 1880, he founded the Fort Concho circuit. He was nicknamed "Fighting Parson" because he often preached in dangerous areas. In 1883, he and his family moved to San Angelo—where he preached in 1880—continuing to work as a circuit rider until converting to the Methodist Episcopal Church, South in 1886. He was appointed to the Lockhart circuit in 1894, and died on October 21, 1895, aged 65, while preaching in Caldwell County. He was buried in Bunton Cemetery, in Dale. His son, Jack, trailblazed the Potter-Blocker Trail, an offshoot of the Great Western Cattle Trail.
