= Lytle High School =

Public school in Texas, United States

Location
- 18975 West FM 2790 South; Lytle, Medina County, Texas 78052-0190; United States; 29.2368°N 98.8071°W

Information
- School type: Public, high school
- Locale: Rural: Fringe
- School district: Lytle ISD
- NCES School ID: 482865003246
- Principal: Elizabeth Stewart
- Teaching staff: 39.66 (on an FTE basis)
- Grades: 9–12
- Enrollment: 495 (2023–2024)
- Student to teacher ratio: 12.48
- Colors: Black & Gold
- Athletics conference: UIL Class 3A
- Mascot: Pirate
- Yearbook: Jolly Roger
- Website: www.lytleisd.org/o/lhs

Lytle High School is a public high school located in Lytle, Texas (USA) and classified as a 3A school by the UIL. It is part of the Lytle Independent School District located in extreme northwest Atascosa County. During 2022–2023, Lytle High School had an enrollment of 487 students and a student to teacher ratio of 12.68. The school received an overall rating of "C" from the Texas Education Agency for the 2024–2025 school year.

== Academics ==
- UIL Academic Meet Champions
  - 1991(2A)

== Athletics ==
The Lytle Pirates compete in these sports -

- Baseball
- Basketball
- Cross Country
- Football
- Golf
- Softball
- Tennis
- Track and Field
- Volleyball

=== State Titles ===
- Boys Cross Country -
  - 2013(3A), 2022(3A), 2024(3A), 2025(3A), 2026(3A)
