= Lytle Independent School District =

School district in Texas, United States

Location
- Lytle, Texas ESC Region 20 USA

District information
- Type: Public Independent school district
- Grades: EE through 12
- Superintendent: Dr. Dustin Breithaupt
- Schools: 5
- NCES District ID: 4828650

Students and staff
- Students: 1850 (2026-27)
- Teachers: 115.70 (2011-12) (on full-time equivalent (FTE) basis)
- Student–teacher ratio: 14.86 (2011-12)

Other information
- Website: www.lytleisd.org

Lytle Independent School District is a public school district based in Lytle, Texas (USA). Located in extreme northwest Atascosa County, a small portion of the district extends into Medina County.

In 2009, the school district was rated "academically acceptable" by the Texas Education Agency.

== Schools ==
High school
- Lytle High School (Grades 9–12)

Middle schools

- Lytle Junior High School (Grades 6–8)

Elementary schools

- Lytle Elementary School (Grades 3–5)
- Lytle Primary School (Grades EE-2)

Alternative school

- Lytle DAEP (Grades 3–12)
