= Tumbleweed Smith =

American broadcaster (born 1935)

Bob Lewis (born 1935), known professionally as "Tumbleweed Smith", is an American radio presenter, broadcaster and newspaper columnist.

== Biography ==
Lewis was born in 1935, in Waco, Texas. He began broadcasting throughout Texas, and adopted the name Tumbleweed Smith in 1970. His radio show The Sound of Texas began broadcasting in 1969, and Lewis has amassed a collection of 14,000 interviews throughout his career, one of the largest private oral history collections in the United States.

Lewis regularly writes for The Gatesville Messenger from his home in Big Spring.

He was inducted into the Texas Trail of Fame in 2013.
