= Nichols Park =

City park in Oklahoma, US

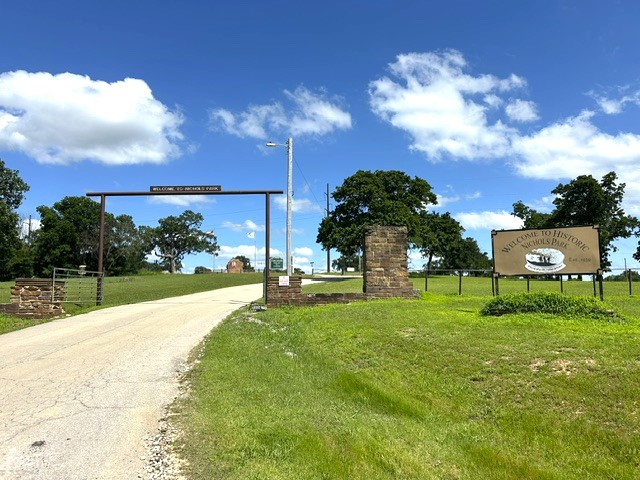
- Entrance to Nichols Park, June of 2026

- Location within Oklahoma
- Location: Okmulgee County, Oklahoma, United States
- Nearest city: Henryetta, OK
- Coordinates: 35.4083266°N 95.9859376°W
- Area: 300 acres (120 ha)
- Established: 1939
- Governing body: City of Henryetta
- Website: www.travelok.com/listings/view.profile/id.33827#listing-menu-tabs

Nichols Park is located south of downtown Henryetta, Okmulgee County, Oklahoma. It was initially developed between 1938 and 1941 by the Civilian Conservation Corps (“CCC”) and the National Park Service. It is over 300 acres in size, and includes the 17-acre Nichols Lake. The park was named after Jack Nichols, a Democratic congressman from the second district of Oklahoma, who was a promoter of CCC projects and was instrumental in securing the park’s construction. The park was added to the National Register of Historic Places listings in Okmulgee County, Oklahoma on December 6, 2006, National Register Information System ID 06001115, with its Areas of Significance listed as Entertainment/Recreation, Architecture, and Landscape Architecture.

== History ==
The park was constructed around the city's original water reservoir, now called Nichols Lake, which was built in 1910. Original highlights include a large rock Beach House in front of a beach swimming area, and two rock shelters, built in the National Park Service rustic style. More recent additions include a 54-hole disc golf course which regularly hosts tournaments. A sand volleyball court is used daily. Three playground areas are scattered through the park. And, a modern rodeo arena hosts two major events each year, including the Jim Shoulders Living Legends Rodeo which attracts thousands. The nearby Jim Hall Lake, also known as Lake Henryetta, adds 450 surface acres of water and about 11 miles of shoreline. Amenities there include boat ramps, docks, primitive campsites, picnic areas, and outdoor grills.

== Gallery ==
Depictions of Nichols Park
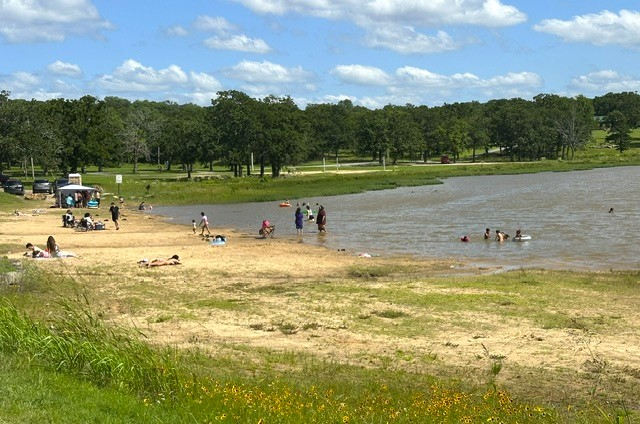
Nichols Park Beach in June, 2026

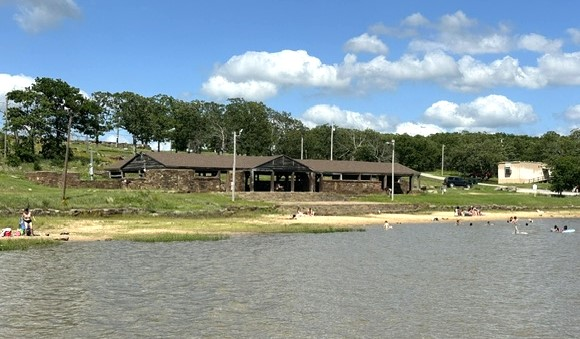
The original rock Nichols Park Beach House in June of 2026

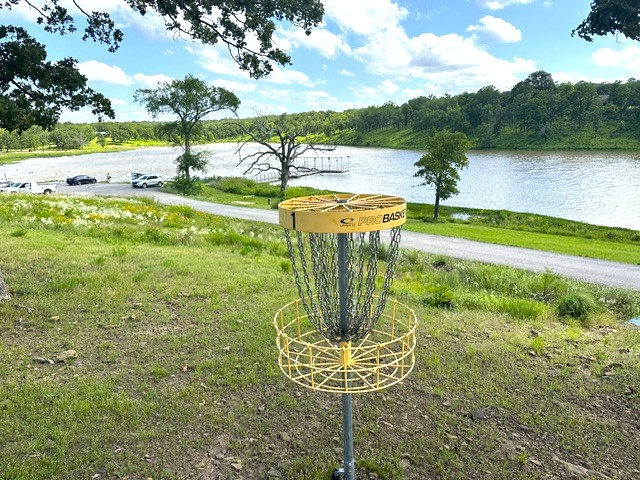
Hole 1 of Nichols Park Disk Golf Course in June of 2026

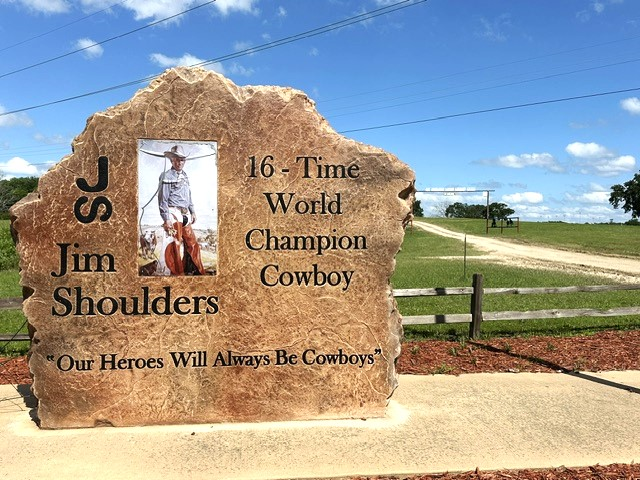
Marker at Jim Shoulders Living Legends Arena in June of 2026

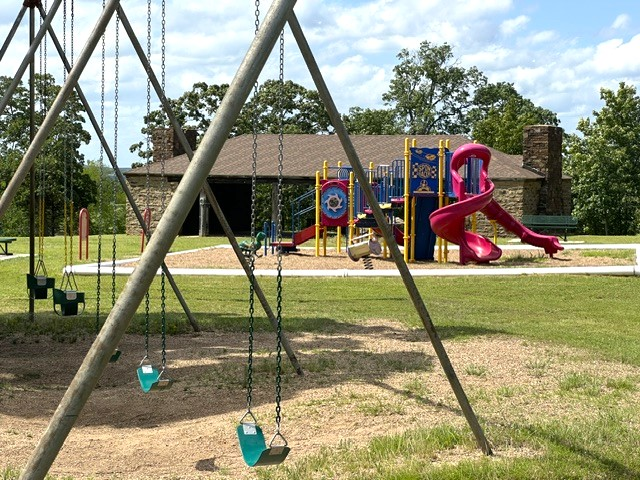
Nichols Park playground equipment with original rock shelter in background, June of 2026

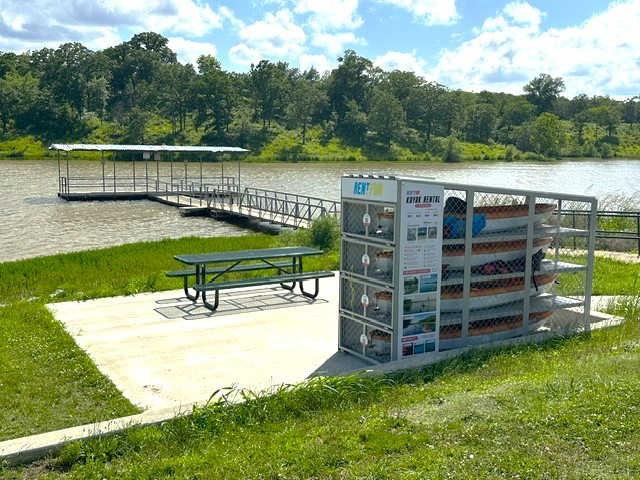
Kayak rentals for Nichols Lake

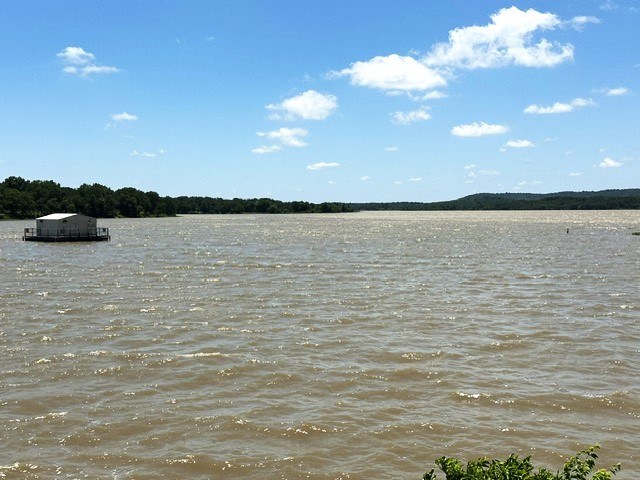
Jim Hall Lake, Henryetta, Oklahoma, in June of 2026

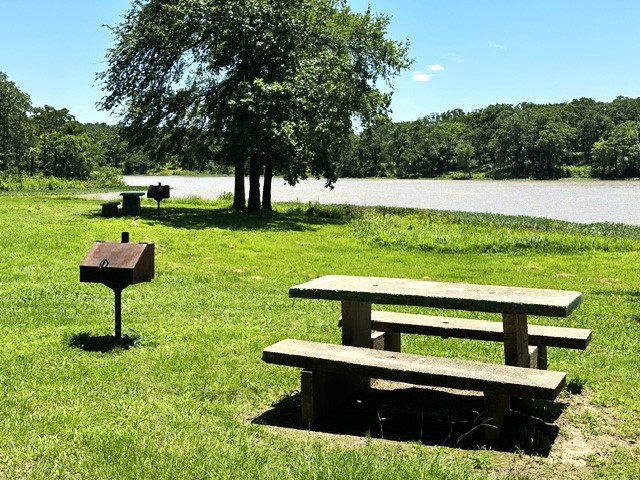
Picnic area at Jim Hall Lake at Henryetta, 6-2026
