= Spelter City, Oklahoma =

Coordinates: 35°27′30″N 95°57′48″W

Spelter City is a populated place within the city of Henryetta, Oklahoma. It is located northeast of Henryetta’s town center, and west of Dewar, Oklahoma.

The area was originally a separate platted addition formally called the Henryetta Townsite Company, but which Henryetta annexed in 1916. Known as Spelter City, it became a “city within a city” due to the placement of a massive Eagle-Picher zinc smelting facility there. Because the area was remote from Henryetta’s business district, it developed as a separate enclave, complete with its own hotels and union hall.

The word “spelter” is directly tied to zinc. One definition says spelter literally means zinc, especially in the form of ingots, slabs or plates. Another definition says spelter refers to impure zinc, usually containing about 3 per cent of lead and other impurities.

Smelting continued at the location through the 1960’s before being discontinued. But Spelter City continues to be shown on maps and the name applied as a recognized area of Henryetta.
