= John T. Lytle =

American rancher, cattle drover and military officer (1844–1907)

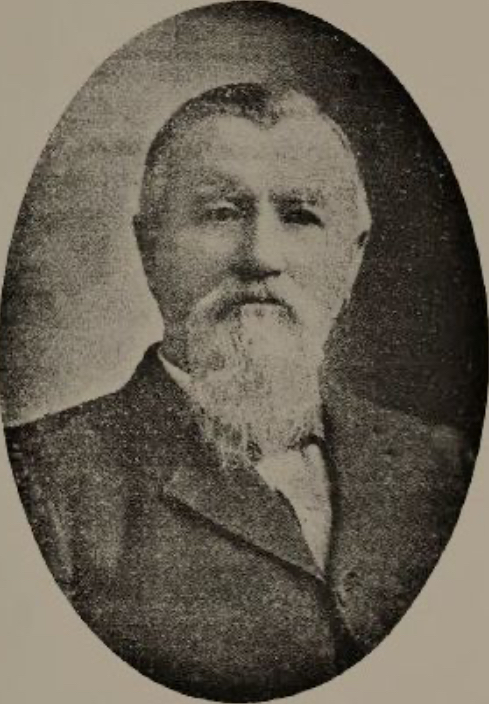
- Born: October 8, 1844; McSherrystown, Pennsylvania, US
- Died: January 10, 1907 (aged 62); San Antonio, Texas, US
- Children: 2
- Military career
- Branch: Army
- Rank: Sergeant
- Unit: 32nd Texas Cavalry Regiment
- Conflicts: American Civil War; Red River campaign; Battle of Mansfield; Battle of Pleasant Hill

John Thomas Lytle (October 8, 1844 – January 10, 1907), nicknamed "Captain Lytle" was an American rancher, cattle drover and military officer. He created the Great Western Cattle Trail.

== Biography ==
Lytle was born on October 8, 1844, in McSherrystown, Pennsylvania, to Irish immigrants Francis and Margaret Lytle (née Collins), moving to San Antonio in 1860, where he worked as a clerk until falling ill in 1861. Afterwards, he and his uncle William moved a Atascosa County ranch. During the American Civil War, he served in the 32nd Texas Cavalry Regiment from September 11, 1863 to 1865, fighting in the Red River campaign, including the battles of Mansfield and Pleasant Hill. He was ranked sergeant by the time of his discharge. In 1869, he married Elizabeth Noonan—sister of judge George H. Noonan—having three children together, one a stillborn.

After the war, he returned to his ranch, leaving in 1867 to found another close to Castroville. In 1871, he and his cousin Thomas McDaniel partnered, and with help from Charles A. Schreiner and others, created the Great Western Cattle Trail in 1874 to supply beef to the Sioux.

In 1886, he, George W. Saunders and Jesse Presnall created a feedlot in San Antonio, and in 1869, he, Thomas Jefferson Moore, John Blocker and W. H. Jennings pooled funds to buy the 500,000-acre Piedra Blanca Ranch. In 1901, he was elected vice president of the Texas and Southwestern Cattle Raisers Association. He died on January 10, 1907, aged 62, in San Antonio, of influenza. He was buried on January 12.

In 2017, a placard covering Lytle's work was installed in Doans, the beginning point of the Great Western Cattle Trail. The community of Lytle is named for him, because he donated land to the residents for public use.
