= Jim Shoulders =

American rodeo cowboy (1928-2007)

- Born: May 13, 1928; Tulsa, Oklahoma, U.S.
- Died: June 20, 2007 (aged 79); Henryetta, Oklahoma, U.S.
- Occupations: Rodeo cowboy; rancher
- Spouse: Sharon (married 1947–2007)

James A. Shoulders (May 13, 1928 – June 20, 2007) was an American professional rodeo cowboy and rancher. He is commemorated at the ProRodeo Hall of Fame. At the time of his death, he was one of the most successful contestants in the Professional Rodeo Cowboys Association (PRCA), having won 16 World Championships, which was the most of any performer at that time. He was known as the 'Babe Ruth of rodeo'.

== Rodeo career ==
In 1943, Shoulders won his first bull riding competition in Oilton, Oklahoma, at the age of fourteen. Shoulders earned $18. He competed until his retirement due to injury at the age of forty-two. His success at competitions included:

- World All-Around Champion Cowboy Championships (1949, 1956, 1957, 1958, 1959).
- World Bull Rider Championships. (1951 and 1954 to 1959).
- World Bareback Bronc Rider Championships. (1950 and 1956 to 1958).

Shoulders was the first competitor to win all three events (bareback bronc, bull riding and all-round) at the National Finals Rodeo (NFR).

Shoulders set the record of 16 world championships in 1959 when he won his 15th and 16th titles. The record stood for a long time until steer roper Guy Allen matched the record in 2001 after winning his 16th steer roping title. Two years later in 2003, he broke Shoulder's record after winning a 17th title. Allen won his 18th and final record to date in 2004. In 2013, Trevor Brazile won another all-around title and his total number of world titles moved to 19 world titles. This broke Allen's record of 18 world titles. As of 2020, Brazile has 26 world titles, eight more than Allen, who is in second place with 18 titles, and Shoulders is in third place with 16 titles. Brazile won his 26th title in 2020.

== Business ventures ==
From his rodeo career earnings, Shoulders bought a 400-acre (1.6 km^{2}) ranch in Oklahoma where he raised livestock. He owned several bucking "weather" bulls, the most famous of which was Tornado, a rodeo bull who threw 200 riders over 14 years. According to Frank Boggs, an Oklahoman sports writer and columnist, Shoulders bought Tornado in South Texas when he was three years old. In 1967, Freckles Brown rode Tornado.

On the basis of his rodeo success, Shoulders took work in advertising. His manager was Billy Martin, a former New York Yankees manager. He made advertisements for products such as Miller Lite beer, jeans (helping to design the Wrangler Jeans 13MWZ 'cowboy cut' jeans); and Justin Boots.

== Honors ==
Shoulders is honored in many rodeo halls of fame. He was an early participant in the American Cowboy Culture Association, which holds the annual National Cowboy Symposium and Celebration each September in Lubbock, Texas.

- Was inducted into the Madison Square Garden Hall of Fame in New York City.
- In 1955, was an inaugural inductee of the National Cowboy & Western Heritage Museum into its National Rodeo Hall of Fame.
- In 1976, was inducted into the Oklahoma Hall of Fame.
- In 1979, was an inaugural inductee into the ProRodeo Hall of Fame in Colorado Springs, Colorado.
- In 1996, was an inaugural inductee into the Professional Bull Riders (PBR) Ring of Honor.
- In 1997, was inducted into the Ellensburg Rodeo Hall of Fame.
- In 1999, was inducted into the St. Paul Rodeo Hall of Fame. That same year, was inducted into the Pendleton Round-Up and Happy Canyon Hall of Fame.
- In 2002, was inducted into the Cheyenne Frontier Days Hall of Fame.
- In 2003, was inducted into the Texas Trail of Fame.
- In 2004, was awarded the Ben Johnson Memorial Award of the National Cowboy & Western Heritage Museum.
- In 2007, was awarded the Legends of ProRodeo by the ProRodeo Hall of Fame.
- In 2011, the Professional Bull Riders created the Heroes and Legends Celebration awards, one of which is the Jim Shoulders Lifetime Achievement Award.
- In 2015, was an inaugural inductee into the Bull Riding Hall of Fame.
- In 2017, was inducted into the Molalla Walk of Fame.
- In 2023, was inducted into the California Rodeo Salinas Hall of Fame. That same year, was posthumously awarded the PBR Ty Murray Top Hand Award.
- Has an entry in the Encyclopædia Britannica.
- Has an entry in the Encyclopedia of the Great Plains.
- Has an entry in The Encyclopedia of Oklahoma History and Culture maintained online by the Oklahoma Historical Society.

The Jim Shoulders Living Legends Rodeo is one of two major events held each year at the Jim Shoulders Living Legends Arena in Nichols Park in his longtime hometown of Henryetta, Oklahoma.

== Personal life ==
Shoulders was born in Tulsa, Oklahoma, on May 13, 1928. Shoulders attended East Central High there and graduated in 1946. In 1951, he moved to Henryetta. In 1947, Shoulders married Sharon Lee Heindselman, and they had four children. Shoulders' son, Marvin Paul Shoulders, has also competed professionally in rodeo sports.

According to his son, Marvin, Shoulders died on June 20, 2007, at 3:30 a.m. in Henryetta, Oklahoma. Shoulders fought a long battle with heart disease but succumbed to the disease at his home.
