= Ironton, Louisiana =

Unincorporated community in Louisiana, U.S.

Coordinates: 29°38′55″N 89°57′41″W

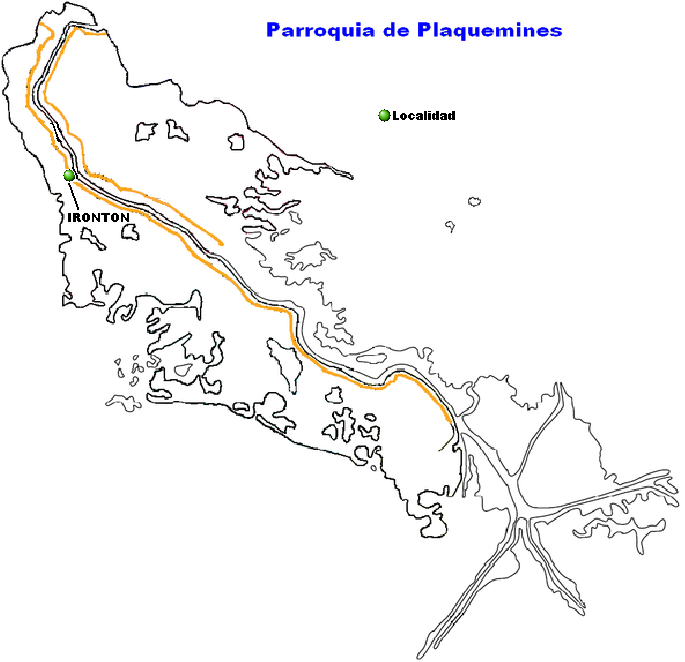
Location of Ironton in Plaquemines Parish

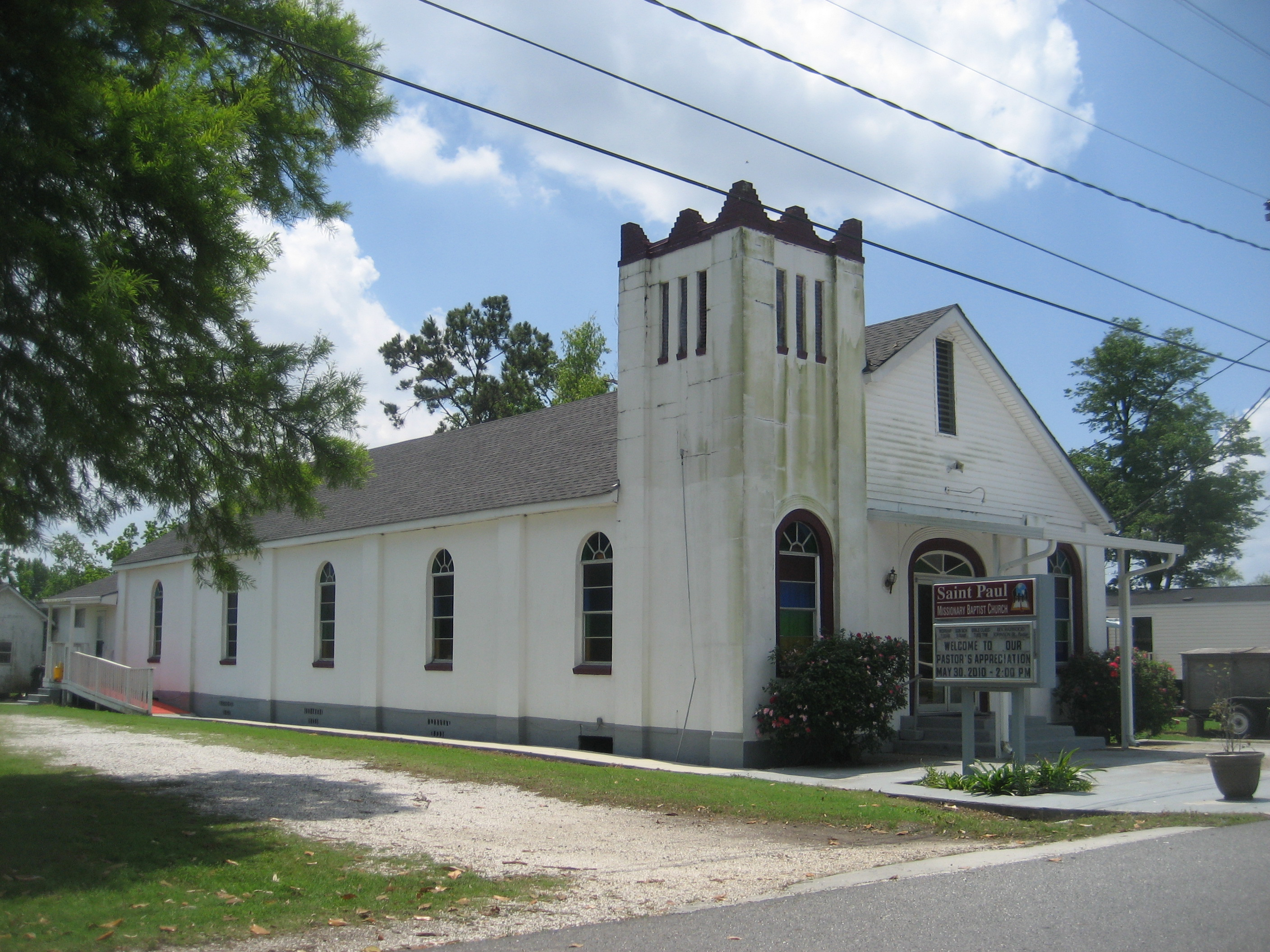
St. Paul Missionary Baptist Church in Ironton

Ironton is an unincorporated community in Plaquemines Parish, Louisiana, United States.

Ironton is on the west bank of the Mississippi River, between Louisiana Highway 23 and the river. The community has historically had a majority-black population. During the long reign of segregationist Plaquemines Parish boss Leander Perez (and continuing under his immediate successors), Ironton was denied infrastructure development granted to white communities in the area. Running water was not provided by the parish until 1980, and only after stories of the residents' demand for this common amenity had been publicized by Time Magazine and CBS 60 Minutes.

Like most of the area, Ironton was devastated in 2005 by Hurricane Katrina and its resulting storm surge.

On August 29, 2021, 16 years to the day after Hurricane Katrina, Category 4 storm Hurricane Ida came ashore just south of Ironton, completely devastating the area for the second time in two decades.
