= Hubbard Independent School District (Bowie County, Texas) =

School district in Texas

Coordinates: 33.5087°N 94.6163°W

District information
- Grades: PK-8
- Schools: 1

Other information
- Website: https://www.hubbardisd.net/

Hubbard Independent School District is a public school district based in the community of Hubbard, Bowie County, Texas, United States, which is located 5 miles south of DeKalb on US 259. The district has one school that serves students in prekindergarten through grade eight. In 2009, the school district was rated "recognized" by the Texas Education Agency. The district changed to a four-day school week in fall 2022.
