= Almondsville, Virginia =

Unincorporated community in Virginia, United States

Coordinates: 37°23′37″N 76°39′03″W

Almondsville is an unincorporated community in Gloucester County, in the U. S. state of Virginia.
