= Great Western Cattle Trail =

Cattle trail used for moving beef stock and horses

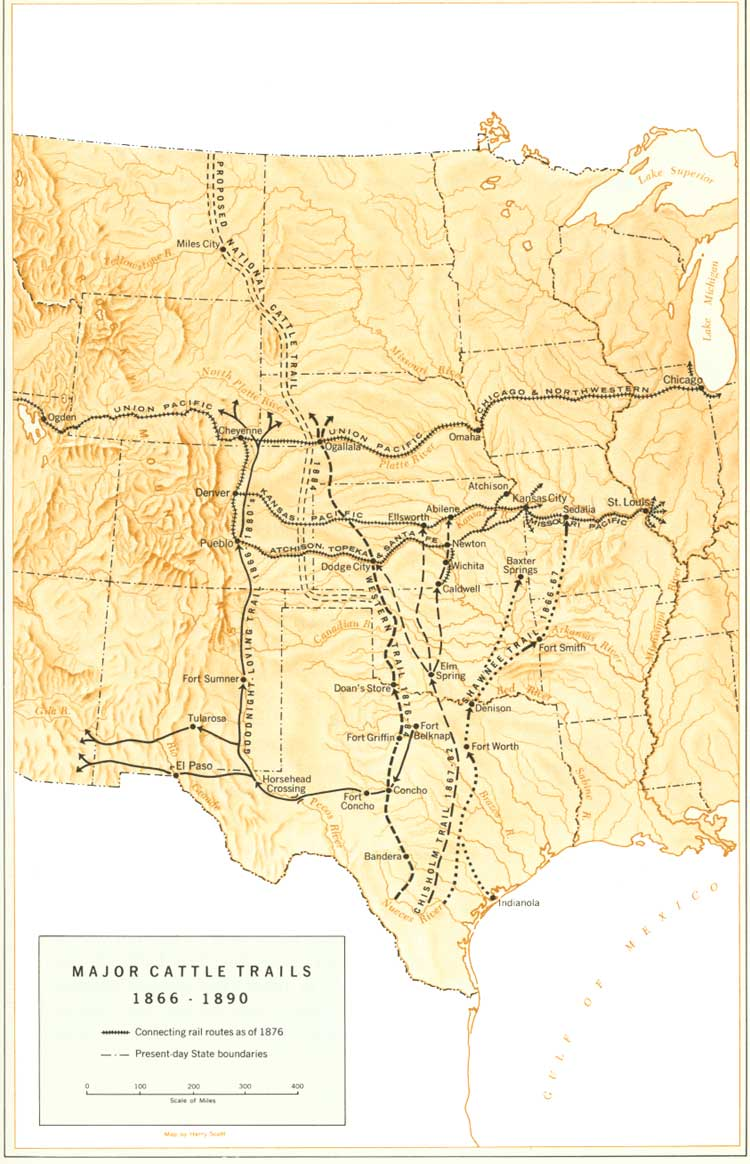
Map of major cattle trails, with the Great Western Trail in the center

The Great Western Cattle Trail is the name used today for a cattle trail established during the late 19th century for moving beef stock and horses to markets in eastern and northern states. It ran west of and roughly parallel to the better known Chisholm Trail into Kansas, reaching an additional major railhead there for shipping beef to Chicago, or longhorns and horses continuing on further north by trail to stock open-range ranches in the Dakotas, Wyoming, Montana in the United States, and Alberta and Saskatchewan in Canada.

Although rail lines were built in Texas, high freight prices for stock continued to make it more profitable to drive cattle north to the major east-west lines in Kansas.

== History ==
In 1874, John T. Lytle left his ranch in Medina County, Texas, with Tom M. McDaniel, according to Gary and Margaret Kraisinger, "to deliver 3,500 head of aged steers to the Red Cloud Indian Agency in unpopulated western Nebraska. Lytle had a government contract with the newly established agency and needed to establish a new route. The route that Lytle blazed across Texas (via Fort Griffin), Indian Territory (via Camp Supply), and by way of Dodge City, Kansas was followed by other outfits and became known as the Western Trail." The 1875 Kansas quarantine law would eventually shut down eastern Kansas rail depots, which led to the development of Dodge City and Ogallala, Nebraska as cattle towns. From 1875 until 1880, the Chisholm Trail, also referred to as the Eastern Trail, became a feeder route into the Western Trail. Western Trail feeder routes extended from Brownsville, Texas, through San Antonio, Bandera, Texas, and the Kerrville area. The Red River was crossed at Doan's Crossing. In 1881, Doan noted that the trail reached its peak, with 301,000 head of cattle driven by.

A western extension of the trail was used by the XIT Ranch for trail drives connecting Tascosa to Dodge City until 1885. Afterwards, the northern portion of the trail connected Buffalo Springs to the XIT range on Cedar Creek, 60 miles north of Miles City, Montana. The trail passed through Lamar, Kit Carson, and Lusk. That trail was used from 1886 until 1897. Over a period of 3 months, some 10,000 to 12,500 steers were moved from the Yellow Houses, at the south end of the XIT Ranch, 1000 miles north to Cedar Creek. There they would graze for two years before being shipped to Chicago.

In 2003 a new project was launched in order to place cement markers every six to ten miles along the trail, from the Rio Grande to Ogallala, Nebraska. Oklahoma set the first post south of the city at Altus. Texas placed its first marker at the Doan's adobe house during the 121st Doan's May Day Picnic of 2005, an event that had been held annually at the now-ghost town of Doans, north of Vernon. A barbecue lunch and T-shirts are available for purchase, and a king and queen are crowned at the event. One of the shirts for 2017 features a design by Harold Dow Bugbee, former curator of the Panhandle-Plains Historical Museum in Canyon, Texas, which depicts longhorns and a cowboy crossing the Red River at Doan's Crossing. There the postmaster Corwin F. Doan (1848-1929) also operated a store to supply the cowboys. Bugbee's sculpture is part of the 1931 Trail Drivers Monument at Doans. During the event, riders cross the river each year from Oklahoma and usually arrive just before noon. The adobe house, built in 1881, is the oldest in Wilbarger County, and is open for tours during the picnic.

In 2004, according to the Kraisingers, "Rotary International started to mark the Western Cattle Trail in its full length from Matamoras, Texas, area to Val Marie, Canada."

== See also ==
- Cattle drives in the United States
- Great Western Trail (board game)
- Dodge City, Kansas - history
- Potter-Blocker Trail
