= Hubbard, Bowie County, Texas =

- Unincorporated community
- Location within Texas Location within the United States
- Coordinates: 33°27′59″N 94°38′19″W
- Country: United States
- State: Texas
- County: Bowie
- Elevation: 427 ft (130 m)
- Time zone: UTC-6 (Central (CST))
  - Summer (DST): UTC-5 (CDT)
- Area codes: 903 & 430
- GNIS feature ID: 1359757

Hubbard is an unincorporated community in Bowie County, Texas, United States. According to the Handbook of Texas, the community had a population of 269 in 2000. It is part of the Texarkana metropolitan area.

== History ==
The community was most likely named for early settler Richard B. Hubbard. The oldest graves in the Hubbard Chapel Cemetery date as far back as 1835. A church, a cemetery, and several scattered houses were in Hubbard in 1936. Its population was recorded as 269 in 1990 and 2000.

== Geography ==
Hubbard is located on U.S. Highway 259, 34 mi (55 km) west of Texarkana and 3 mi (4.8 km) southwest of DeKalb in western Bowie County.

== Education ==
Hubbard had its own school in 1936. The Hubbard Independent School District and the DeKalb Independent School District serve area students.
