= Blocker brothers =

American rancher brothers

William "Bill" Butler Blocker (May 28, 1850 – October 28, 1921), John Rufus Blocker (December 19, 1851 – December 1, 1927) and Abner "Ab" Pickens Blocker Jr. (January 30, 1856 – August 9, 1943) were American rancher brothers.

== William Blocker ==
William Blocker
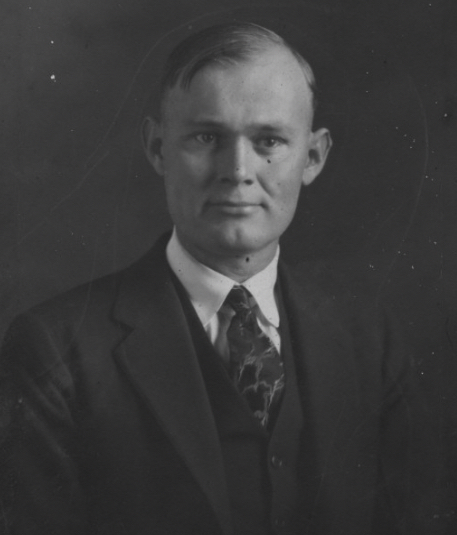
- Blocker's portrait for Clarendon College
- Born: William Butler Blocker; May 28, 1850; Mobile, Alabama, US
- Died: October 28, 1921 (aged 71); Austin, Texas, US

William was born on May 28, 1850, the oldest son of planter Abner Pickens Sr. and Cornelia Randolph Blocker (née Murphy), in Mobile, Alabama. In 1852, the family moved onto a ranch south of Austin, Texas, where the brothers worked as cattle ranchers. An attendee of private school throughout his childhood, he attended Clarendon College from 1922 to 1924 to study law, but began ranching at age 19, using $3,000 he borrowed from Thomas F. McKinney to purchase cattle to drove up the Chisholm Trail. In 1871, he and John purchased a ranch in Blanco County, and were joined by Abner in 1876. In 1874, William married pioneer and rancher Elizabeth Eleanor Irving and had eight children together. He bought a second ranch between Lockhart and Austin, but lived with his family in Austin. In 1893, all three brothers completed their last drove of 9,000 head to Deadwood, South Dakota for Harris Franklin. After the invention of the car, he continued driving a buggy despite purchasing one. He died on October 28, 1921, aged 71, in Austin.

== John Blocker ==
John Blocker
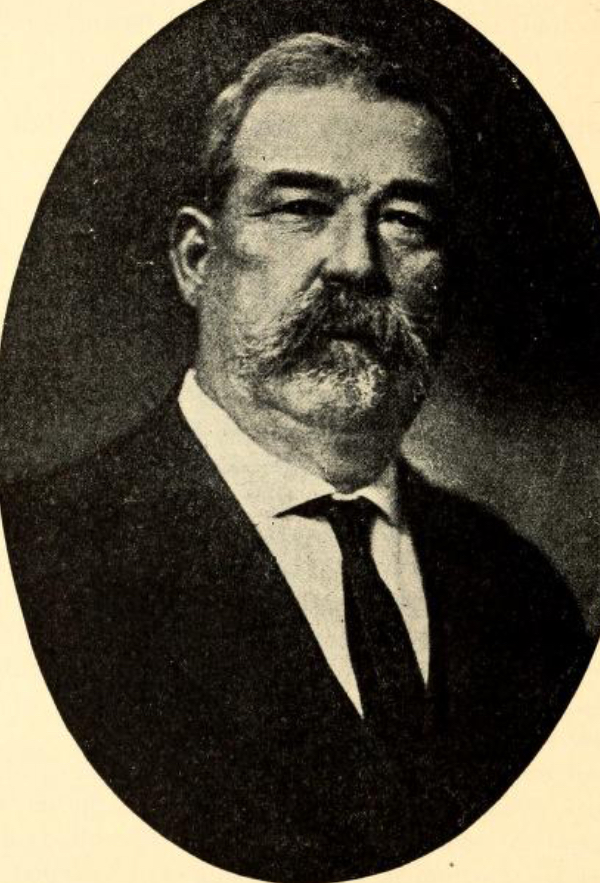
- Blocker in 1925
- Born: John Rufus Blocker; December 19, 1851; Edgefield County, South Carolina, US
- Died: December 1, 1927 (aged 75); San Antonio, Texas, US
- Burial place: Dignowity Cemetery

John was born on December 19, 1851, in Edgefield County, South Carolina. During the American Civil War, John worked as a cattle drover and later attended Bastrop Academy. Until the 1890s, John drove Texas Longhorns northward, and was noted for his "Blocker loop" lasso. He married Annie Lane in 1881, having four children together. The owner of several ranches—including Chupadero Ranch, which he made Abner the range boss of—he lived with his family in San Antonio, and was a member of the Texas and Southwestern Cattle Raisers Association and the Trail Drivers Association, serving as the latter's first president. He died on December 1, 1927, aged 75, in San Antonio, and was buried in Dignowity Cemetery, along with Abner.

== Abner Blocker ==
Abner Blocker
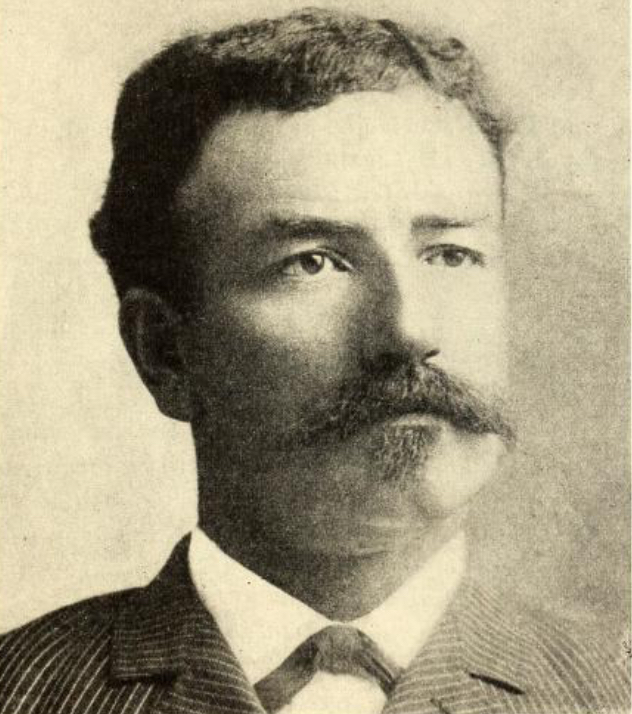
- Blocker in 1925
- Born: Abner Pickens Blocker Jr. January 30, 1856; Austin, Texas, US
- Died: August 9, 1943 (aged 87); San Antonio, Texas, US
- Burial place: Dignowity Cemetery

Abner was born on the ranch near Austin on January 30, 1856. Joining William and John in 1876, he drove 3,000 cattle to John Sparks in Wyoming in 1867. He continued droving Texas Longhorns through the north, and in 1885, began droving for XIT Ranch, after doing so for manager Burton "Barbecue" Harvey Campbell. He created the 'XIT' brand. He worked as a cotton farmer from 1887 to 1889, and returned to ranching following a drought. In 1890, John made him the range boss of his Chupadero Ranch. Retiring in 1893, he married Florence Baldwin in 1896, having one child. The family lived on a La Salle County ranch until moving to Oklahoma in 1901 following drought. Returning to Texas in 1902, they moved to San Antonio and Abner became a member of the Texas and Southwestern Cattle Raisers Association. He died on August 9, 1943, aged 87, and was buried in Dignowity Cemetery, along with John.
