= Henryetta, Oklahoma =

- City
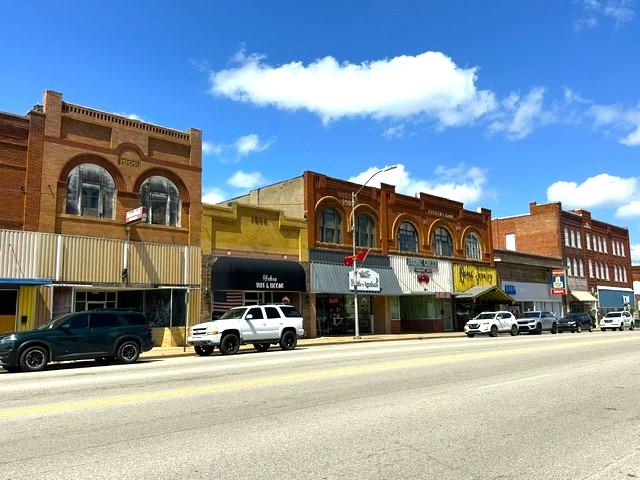
- On Henryetta’s Main St, 6-2026, inc. (L-R) commercial buildings from 1909, 1908 & 1905; the Citizens Bank from 1904; & at far right, the Opera House from 1910.

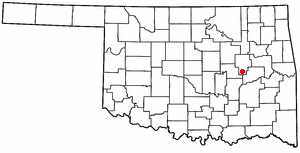
- Location of Henryetta, Oklahoma
- Coordinates: 35°26′30″N 95°59′11″W
- Country: United States
- State: Oklahoma
- County: Okmulgee

Government
  - Type: Council-Manager

Area
  - Total: 6.88 sq mi (17.83 km^{2})
  - Land: 6.85 sq mi (17.74 km^{2})
  - Water: 0.039 sq mi (0.10 km^{2})
- Elevation: 738 ft (225 m)

Population (2020)
  - Total: 5,640
  - Density: 823.6/sq mi (318.01/km^{2})
- Time zone: UTC-6 (Central (CST))
  - Summer (DST): UTC-5 (CDT)
- ZIP code: 74437
- Area codes: 539/918
- FIPS code: 40-33750
- GNIS feature ID: 2410744
- Website: henryetta.gov

Henryetta is a city in Okmulgee County, Oklahoma, United States. The population was 5,640 at the 2020 census.

== History ==
Hugh Henry established a ranch on Creek Nation land in 1885. He soon found a deposit of coal, which he began using to fuel the forge at his ranch. Discovery of more coal deposits in the large Henryetta Coal Formation attracted several railroads to develop these mines. A settlement named Furrs grew up around the mines. The name changed to Henryetta when a post office opened on August 28, 1900.

At statehood in 1907, Henryetta had 1,051 residents. The economy was based on agriculture, coal, natural gas and oil. In 1909, the area had 14 coal mines, producing 65,000 tons per month. By 1910, the population had grown to 1,671. The town added a broom factory, several brick factories and a bottling plant during the 1920s. By the time of the 36th annual report of the Department of Mines and Minerals in 1943, combined yearly production by Acme Coal Company, Atlas Coal Company, Ben Hurr Coal Company, Starr Coal Company, and Wardin-Pullen Coal Company—all of Henryetta—was over 600,000 tons.

Henryetta's manufacturing base continued to expand. Pittsburgh Plate Glass (PPG) built a plate glass window plant in Henryetta in 1929–30, employing 900 people and claiming to be the largest west of the Mississippi River. The factory closed in 1974, but was purchased and refitted for making glass containers, and continues in operation by Anchor Glass Container.

Eagle-Picher placed a massive zinc smelting facility in the Spelter City area of town, which continued through the 1960's. The company also employed more than 700 people at its plant that extracted the rare metal germanium. The plant has since closed and become a successful Superfund cleanup site.

Besides Anchor Glass, current employers include the international oilfield-services company Shawcor; Henryetta Pallet, a regional wood pallet manufacturer; and, G&H Decoy, a waterfowl decoy manufacturer since 1934.

On May 1, 2023, seven people were killed in a mass murder in Henryetta, allegedly by Jesse McFadden, found as one of the deceased.

== Geography ==
According to the United States Census Bureau, the city has a total area of 6.1 square miles (16 km^{2}), of which 6.0 square miles (16 km^{2}) is land and 0.04 square miles (0.10 km^{2}) (0.66%) is water.

== Demographics ==
Historical population
Census	Pop.	Note	%±
1910	1,671		—
1920	5,889		252.4%
1930	7,694		30.7%
1940	6,905		−10.3%
1950	7,987		15.7%
1960	6,551		−18.0%
1970	6,430		−1.8%
1980	6,432		0.0%
1990	5,872		−8.7%
2000	6,096		3.8%
2010	5,927		−2.8%
2020	5,640		−4.8%
U.S. Decennial Census

=== 2020 census ===
As of the 2020 census, Henryetta had a population of 5,640. The median age was 38.7 years, 25.2% of residents were under the age of 18, and 20.3% of residents were 65 years of age or older. For every 100 females there were 90.3 males, and for every 100 females age 18 and over there were 86.7 males age 18 and over.

97.0% of residents lived in urban areas, while 3.0% lived in rural areas.

There were 2,175 households in Henryetta, of which 31.8% had children under the age of 18 living in them. Of all households, 38.7% were married-couple households, 19.9% were households with a male householder and no spouse or partner present, and 33.3% were households with a female householder and no spouse or partner present. About 32.4% of all households were made up of individuals and 16.6% had someone living alone who was 65 years of age or older.

There were 2,684 housing units, of which 19.0% were vacant. Among occupied housing units, 59.0% were owner-occupied and 41.0% were renter-occupied. The homeowner vacancy rate was 3.6% and the rental vacancy rate was 13.5%.

Racial composition as of the 2020 census
Race	Percent
White	64.9%
Black or African American	1.0%
American Indian and Alaska Native	19.6%
Asian	0.6%
Native Hawaiian and Other Pacific Islander	0.3%
Some other race	0.9%
Two or more races	12.9%
Hispanic or Latino (of any race)	4.6%

=== 2000 census ===
As of the census of 2000, there were 6,096 people, 2,460 households, and 1,589 families residing in the city. The population density was 1,009.8 inhabitants per square mile (389.9/km^{2}). There were 2,844 housing units at an average density of 471.1 per square mile (181.9/km^{2}). The racial makeup of the city was 79.69% White, 0.57% African American, 12.30% Native American, 0.33% Asian, 0.02% Pacific Islander, 0.79% from other races, and 6.30% from two or more races. Hispanic or Latino of any race were 2.20% of the population.

There were 2,460 households, out of which 14.8% had a female householder with no husband present, and 35.4% were non-families. 31.9% of all households were made up of individuals, and 17.3% had someone living alone who was 65 years of age or older. The average household size was 2.39 and the average family size was 3.00.

In the city, the population was spread out, with 25.9% under the age of 18, 8.3% from 18 to 24, 23.6% from 25 to 44, 22.5% from 45 to 64, and 19.7% who were 65 years of age or older. The median age was 39 years. For every 100 females, there were 86.3 males. For every 100 females age 18 and over, there were 80.1 males.

The median income for a household in the city was $20,115, and the median income for a family was $24,760. Males had a median income of $28,661 versus $14,268 for females. The per capita income for the city was $11,908. About 19.9% of families and 22.8% of the population were below the poverty line, including 29.8% of those under age 18 and 17.8% of those age 65 or over.

== Arts and culture ==
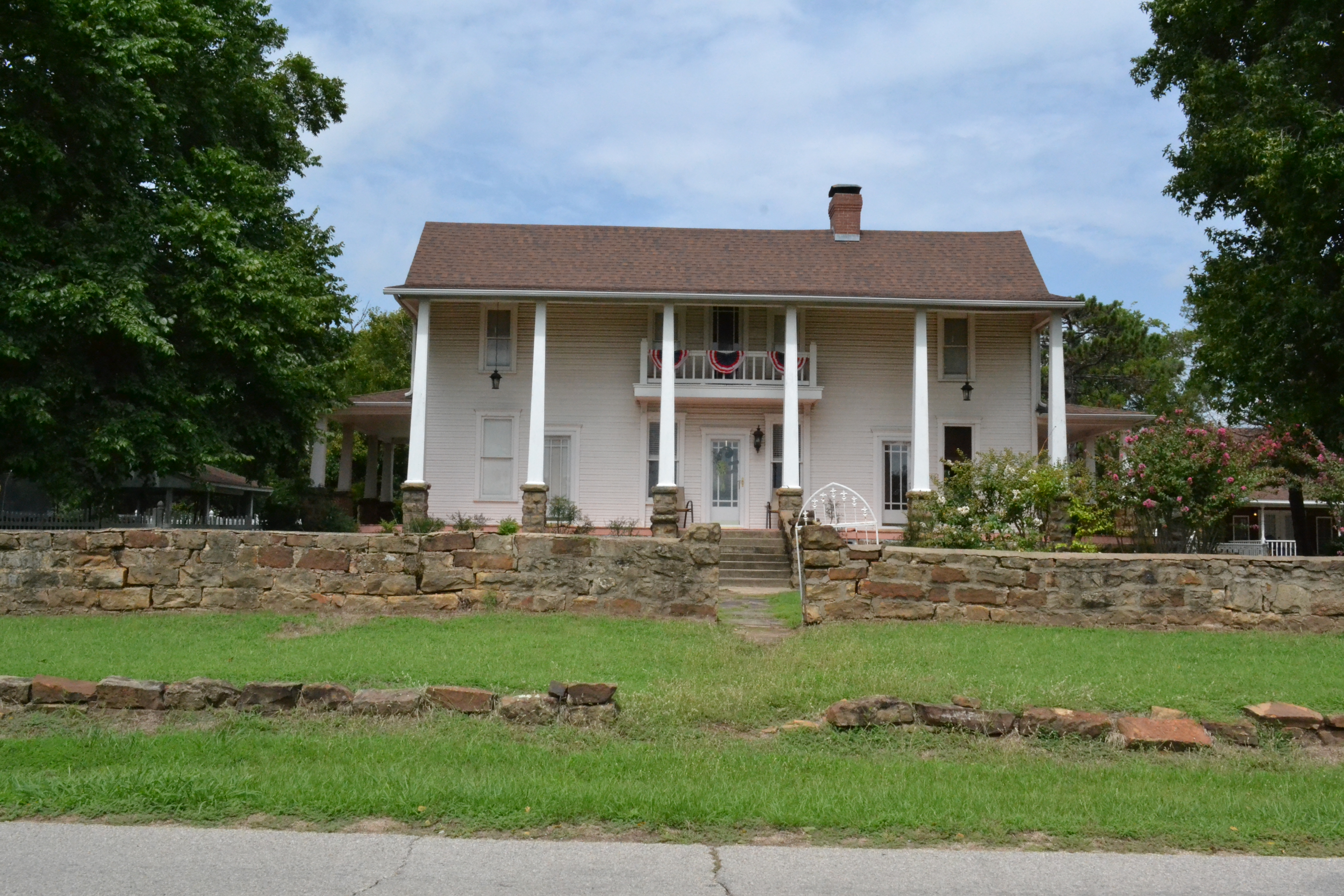
Hugh Henry House

=== Events ===
Henryetta Labor Day Beard & Stache Competition is an annual community event held in Henryetta, Oklahoma, as part of the city’s Labor Day festival programming. It was founded locally by Oklahoma Beard Lovers.

Henryetta has two large annual rodeos, being the Jim Shoulders Spring Roundup Rodeo in June and the Living Legends Rodeo over Labor Day Weekend.

=== Historic locations ===
The Henryetta Historical Museum is housed in what was the town's first schoolhouse, and later what was the town's first courthouse.

The Henryetta Golf Course and Country Club was established in the 1920s.

Hugh Henry House, Nichols Park, and the First Presbyterian Church are included on the National Register of Historic Places listings in Okmulgee County, Oklahoma.

== Parks and recreation ==
South of Henryetta is Nichols Park, developed between 1938 and 1941 by the Civilian Conservation Corps and the National Park Service, which is over 300 acres in size, and includes the 17 acre Nichols Lake. The park hosts many outdoor activities such as disc golf, baseball, all-terrain vehicle off-road trails, hiking trails, several playgrounds, multiple covered shelters for picnicking, primitive campsites, and large open fields for events.

Jim Hall Lake, also known as Lake Henryetta, is 450 surface acres southeast of town. Amenities include boat ramps, docks, primitive campsites, picnic areas, and outdoor grills.

Lake Henryetta is the town's source of public drinking water.

== Government ==
Henryetta has a council-manager form of government with an elected mayor.

== Media ==
Both the Henryetta Free-Lance and TheHenryettan.com offer news services to the community.

== Infrastructure ==
=== Transportation ===
Henryetta is at the crossroads of Interstate 40, being a major east–west interstate highway through the south-central portion of the United States, and U.S. Route 75, being a major north–south highway currently extending from Noyes, Minnesota on the Canada–United States border south to Dallas, Texas. Henryetta is also served by US Route 266 and Oklahoma State Highway 124.

Henryetta Municipal Airport (FAA ID: F10), owned by the City of Henryetta, is located about 3 miles southwest and offers a 3501 x 50 ft. (1067 x 15 m) paved runway.

Commercial air transportation is available out of Tulsa International Airport, about 60 miles to the north.

Henryetta is served by the KI BOIS Area Transit System ("KATS"), a low-cost public bus/van service established in 1983 to help communities, primarily in southeast Oklahoma, by providing access to Senior Citizen centers, groceries, medical services, and jobs. Their service includes transportation to Okmulgee and Tulsa.

== Notable people ==
- Troy Aikman: NFL Hall of Fame quarterback
- Alice Ghostley: actress (Bewitched, Grease, Designing Women)
- Dwanna L. McKay: Indigenous studies scholar and sociologist
- Mark Ryal: former Major League baseball player
- Jim Shoulders: rodeo favorite
- Steven W. Taylor: Oklahoma Supreme Court Chief Justice
