= Midnight (horse) =

- Breed: Thoroughbred x Percheron
- Discipline: Saddle bronc
- Foaled: 1916
- Color: Black

Honors
- Inducted into ProRodeo Hall of Fame

Midnight (1916–1936) was a bucking horse who in 1979 was inducted into the ProRodeo Hall of Fame.

== Early life and appearance ==
Midnight was foaled in 1916 on the Cottonwood ranch in the Porcupine Hills, west of Fort MacLeod, in Alberta, Canada. He was originally owned by Jim McNab. He was a black horse standing 15.1 hands (61 inches, 155 cm) and weighing 1,300 pounds. He was a crossbred horse. He was Thoroughbred on his dam's side and Percheron /Morgan cross on his sire's side. Midnight was branded with McNab's Door Key brand.

When he was a three-year-old, McNab broke him to be a saddle horse by using him for a cow horse. He used him this way for two years. Midnight's spirit was so erratic that he was ready to buck even after a one- or two-day ride. According to an article by a writer in the Oklahoman, Midnight is a legend. "As often happens with legends, both human and equine, recounting the early days of such standouts can be difficult and confusing. As a rodeo historian, I have heard it both ways: Midnight was never gentled, always bucked from the very start; or Midnight was broken to the saddle and served on the McNabb Ranch as a using horse."

== Career - 1920s ==
McNab had tired of dealing with Midnight by 1920. He decided to try his luck using the horse for bucking at some nearby rodeos. In 1924, he entered Midnight in the Calgary Stampede rodeo. Midnight was proclaimed the "champion bucking horse of Western Canada." During the 1920s, Midnight developed the reputation of being unrideable. Those attempting to ride him were usually thrown off in only 2 to 3 seconds. At that time, the target was to ride the horse for ten seconds. Then, in 1926, according to the Canadian Pro Rodeo Hall of Fame, a cowboy who would some day be in the ProRodeo Hall of Fame rode Midnight in Montreal, Quebec. An article in the Calgary Herald also claims Pete Knight rode the horse.

It was in the late 1920s that McNab sold Midnight to stock contractors Peter Welch and Strawberry Red Wall. The two were producers for Canadian rodeos. The pair then also acquired a smaller black horse called Tumbling Mustard. Tumbling Mustard's previous owner was a Sarcee Indian reservation. Not too long after that, the pair sold both horses to Colonel Jim Skew. Supposedly, he paid $250 for the horse but he was just "too much horse" for his show's riders. So, Skew turned around and sold both to producers Eddie McCarty and Vern Elliot. They hailed from Wyoming and Colorado. Verne and McCarty were a team who operated together. Verne was a notable rodeo producer and stock contractor who was inducted into ProRodeo Hall of Fame in 1990. He was the last owner of the two horses.

== 1930s career ==
Some say it is only rumors that he was ridden by a cowboy named Pete Knight during Cheyenne Frontier Days at some point in the early 1930s. Regardless, according to many sources, no one is on record as having officially ridden Midnight, despite his long career and multiple appearances in large rodeos. However, the Texas Trail of Fame claims he was ridden by nine riders. He bucked at the inaugural National Western Stock Show and Rodeo in Denver, Colorado, in 1931. This continued until 1933 when he retired from bucking at the end of Cheyenne Frontier Days due to ringbone disorder. However, owner and horse made one trip to England. Midnight took four exhibition rides there, in Wembley Stadium. They soon returned home where Elliot retired Midnight to the pasture of his ranch.

== Death ==
About three years after retirement, Midnight died on November 5, 1936, at the Denver Rodeo. He was buried on the McCarty-Elliott Ranch in Johnstown, Colorado, originally. He was estimated to be around 20 years old. He was buried beneath a gravestone saying: "Underneath this sod lies a great bucking horse. There never lived a cowboy he couldn't toss. His name was Midnight, his coat as black as coal. If there is a hoss-heaven, God please, rest his soul." Tumbling Mustard was renamed to Five Minutes to Midnight. He also died on the ranch and was buried there. Later, both horses were moved and buried on the grounds of the National Cowboy and Western Heritage Museum in Oklahoma City, Oklahoma. Both horses were posthumously inducted into the ProRodeo Hall of Fame in 1979. On July 9, 1967, in recognition of Midnight, Jim McNab officially opened the Midnight Stadium in Fort MacLeod, Alberta.

== Honors ==
- 2006 Texas Trail of Fame
- 2003 Cheyenne Frontier Days Hall of Fame
- 1981 Canadian Pro Rodeo Hall of Fame
- 1979 ProRodeo Hall of Fame
- 1969 Pendleton Round-Up and Happy Canyon Hall of Fame

== Pop culture ==
In 1957 a 96-page novella entitled Midnight, Champion Bucking Horse was written about him by Sam Savitt.

== See also ==
- List of historical horses
