= Oklahoma State Highway 56 =

Highway in Oklahoma, United States

State Highway 56
- Seminole Nation Highway
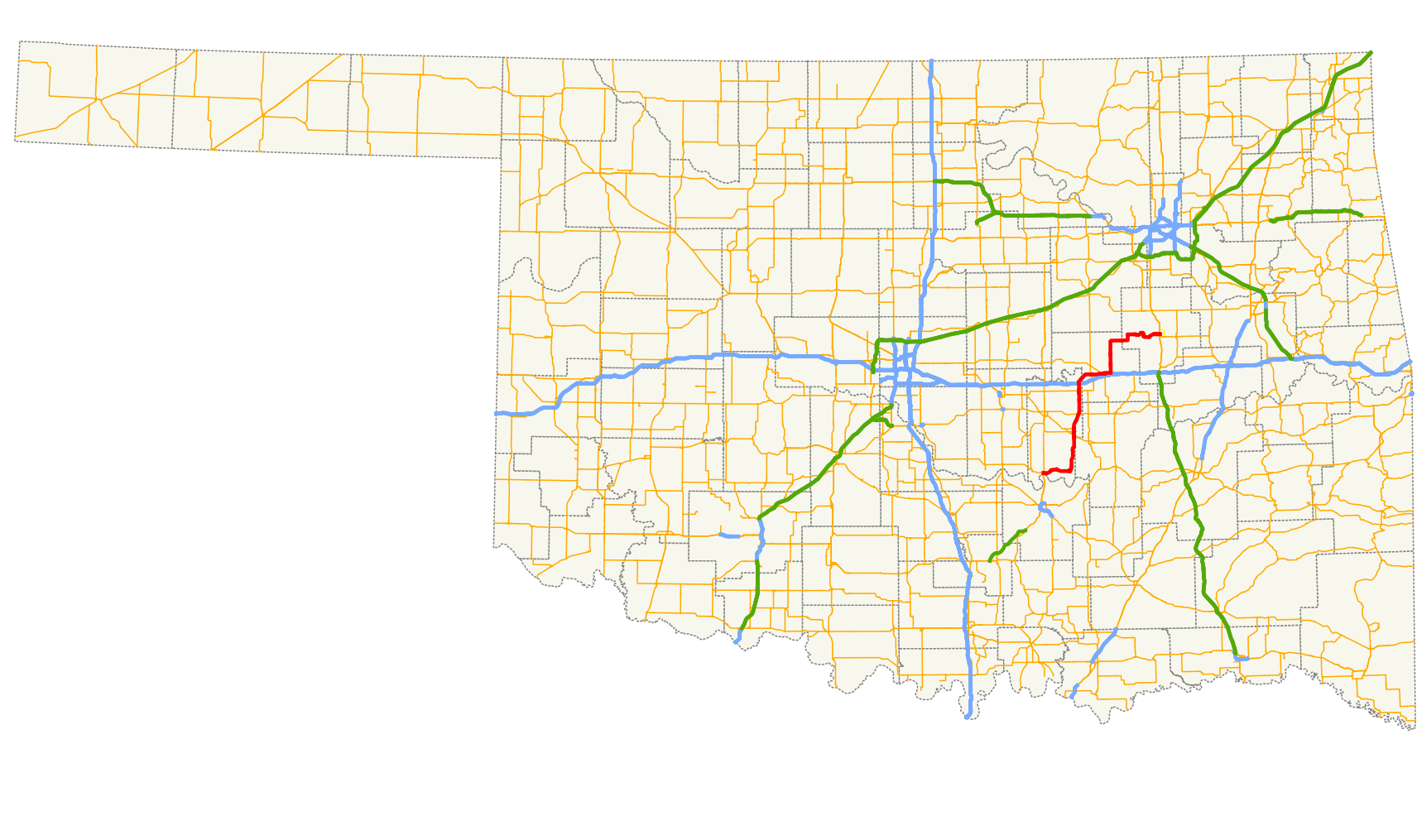

Route information
- Maintained by ODOT
- Length: 86.7 mi (139.5 km)
- Existed: August 28, 1929–present

Major junctions
- South end: US 377 / SH-3E / SH-39 / SH-99 east of Konawa
- US 270 in Wewoka; I-40 in Cromwell; US 62 / SH-27 in Okemah
- North end: US 75 in Okmulgee

Location
- Country: United States
- State: Oklahoma

Highway system
- Oklahoma State Highway System; Interstate; US; State; Turnpikes
| ← US 56 | → SH-58 |

State Highway 56 (abbreviated SH-56 or OK-56) is a state highway in the U.S. state of Oklahoma. The road serves Seminole County, Okfuskee County, and Okmulgee Counties in central and east-central Oklahoma. In Seminole County, it is also designated as the Seminole Nation Highway in honor of the contributions the Seminole Nation has made to the state of Oklahoma.

SH-56 begins at an intersection with US-377 four miles (6 km) east of Konawa, and extends to US-75 in Okmulgee. The highway's total length is 86.7 miles (139.5 km).

SH-56 was first added to the state highway system in 1929. It was gradually extended to its present length between then and 1942.

== Route description ==
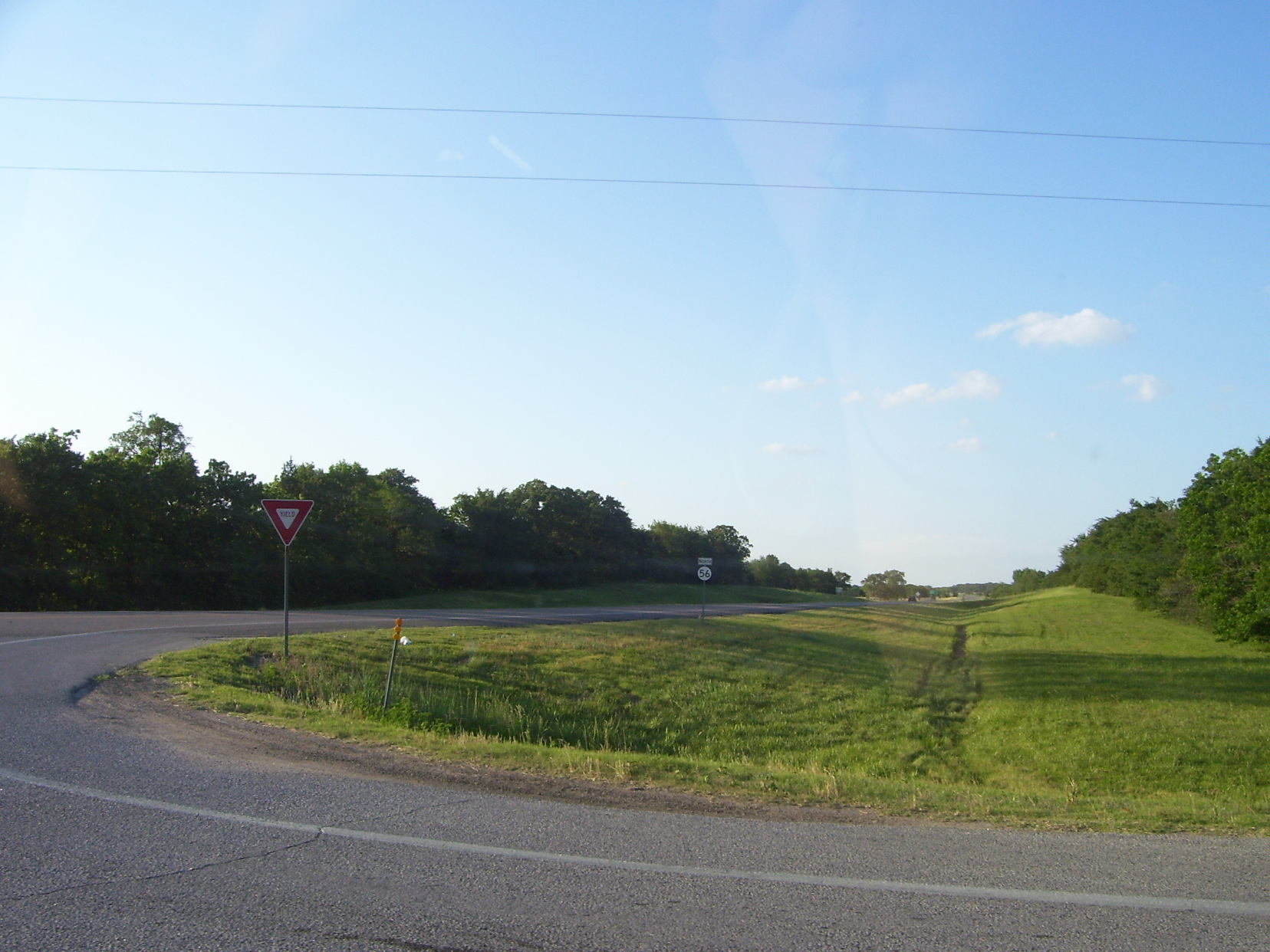
Northbound SH-56 as seen from the SH-9 junction

SH-56 begins at the junction of SH-39 and US-377/SH-3E/SH-99 four miles (6 km) east of Konawa. From here, the highway and heads east, curving through the hilly terrain of southeastern Seminole County. The highway passes through the town of Sasakwa 10 miles (16 km) east of US-377. At Sasakwa, the road turns north, crossing the Little River northeast of town and generally paralleling the Seminole–Hughes County county line.

The highway then bisects the town of Wewoka, intersecting US-270 and concurring with its business loop. SH-56 also serves as the eastern terminus of SH-59 in Wewoka. North of the town, SH-56 intersects with SH-9. The highway continues north, intersecting SH-99A in Cromwell and interchanging with I-40 near the unincorporated community of Schoolton. After crossing I-40, SH-56 makes a long arc to the east, bringing it into Okfuskee County.

Just east of the county line, SH-56 bridges the North Canadian River. South of Castle, the road intersects with SH-48. SH-56 then proceeds east into Okemah, the county seat, where it has a short concurrency with both US-62 and SH-27. The highway continues east from town, then turns north, before turning back to the east to pass through the unincorporated settlement of Okfuskee. East of Okfuskee, the highway enters Okmulgee County.

In Okmulgee County, SH-56 skirts the northern edge of Okmulgee Lake and serves Dripping Springs State Park. East of the lake, it passes through Okmulgee Wildlife Refuge and Deep Fork National Wildlife Refuge. It then enters the city of Okmulgee. There, SH-56 comes to an end at US-75. However, there is a separate loop route segment of SH-56 that starts from a more northerly point on US-75 and runs a short distance to US-62.

== History ==
State Highway 56 traces its origins to August 28, 1929, its original date of commissioning. At that time, the highway only consisted of the portion of the route extending from the SH-99 junction (then SH-48) east to Sasakwa, thence north to end at SH-3 south of Wewoka. The highway underwent its first extension just under two years later, on June 15, 1931, when it was extended to end at US-62 in Okemah. The highway was extended to Okmulgee on April 13, 1942, bringing it to its current extent. Other than minor realignments and establishment of the Loop route segment, the highway has undergone no further changes since 1942.

== Junction list ==
| County | Location | mi | km | Destinations | Notes |
|---|---|---|---|---|---|
| Seminole | | 0.0 | 0.0 | SH-39 west / US 377 / SH-3E / SH-99 | Southern terminus; road continues west as SH-39 |
| Seminole | Wewoka | 23.1 | 37.2 | US 270 / US 270 Bus. begin | Eastern terminus of US-270 Bus., southern end of US-270 Bus. concurrency |
| Seminole | Wewoka | 24.2 | 38.9 | SH-59 (14th Street) | Eastern terminus of SH-59 |
| Seminole | Wewoka | 25.1 | 40.4 | US 270 Bus. west | Northern end of US-270 Bus. concurrency |
| Seminole | | 30.5 | 49.1 | SH-9 | |
| Seminole | Cromwell | 38.6 | 62.1 | SH-99A | |
| Seminole | Cromwell | 41.2 | 66.3 | I-40 – Oklahoma City, Ft. Smith | I-40 exit 212 |
| Okfuskee | | 47.2 | 76.0 | SH-48 | |
| Okfuskee | Okemah | 51.8 | 83.4 | US 62 east / SH-27 south (Woody Guthrie Street) | Western end of US-62/SH-27 concurrency |
| Okfuskee | Okemah | 52.1 | 83.8 | US 62 west (Columbia Street) / SH-27 end | Eastern end of US-62/SH-27 concurrency, northern terminus of SH-27 |
| Okmulgee | Okmulgee | 86.7 | 139.5 | US 75 (Wood Drive) | Northern terminus; road continues east as 6th Street |
1.000 mi = 1.609 km; 1.000 km = 0.621 mi: Concurrency terminus; Route transition

== Loop route ==
State Highway 56 Loop
- Location: Okmulgee, Oklahoma
- Existed: 1962–present

State Highway 56 Loop (also known as SH-56 Loop or more commonly, Loop 56) is a bypass route around the northeast quadrant of Okmulgee, starting from US-75 in the north of Okmulgee, running in an arc east and then south, and connecting with US-62 east of the city. Although it shares its number with SH-56, it does not intersect its implied parent route. Among other functions, the highway provides access to Oklahoma State University Institute of Technology as well as the College of the Muscogee Nation. Loop 56 is 3.7 miles (6.0 km) long. It was established on May 7, 1962.

=== Loop Route Major Intersections ===
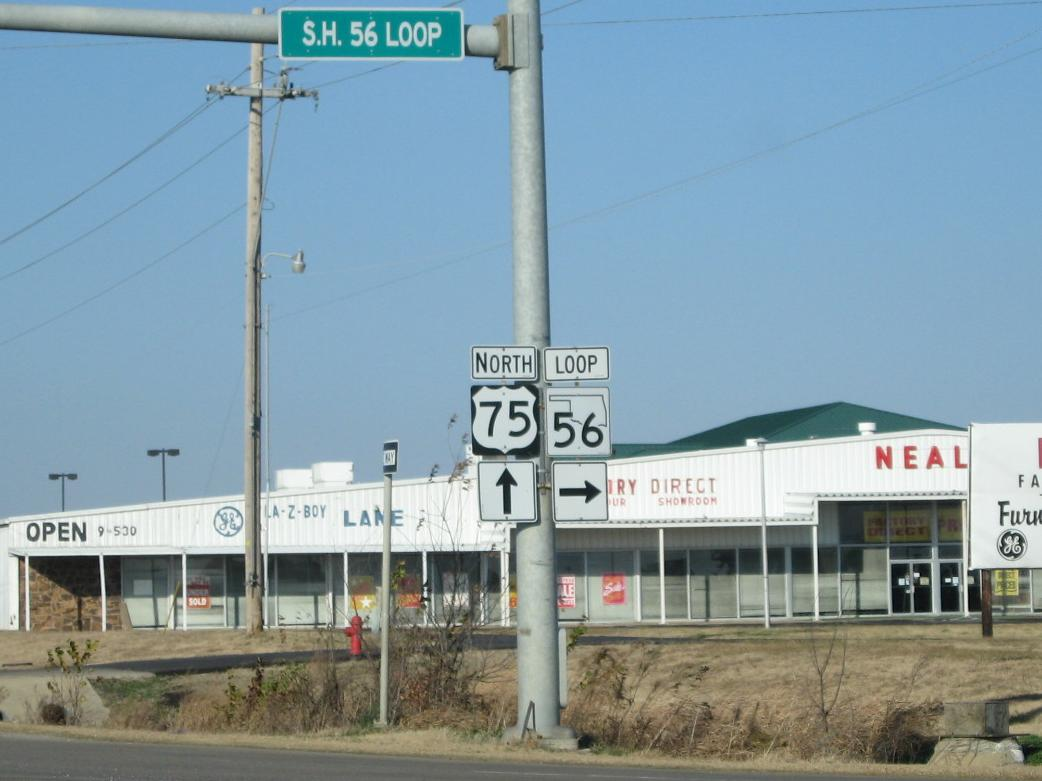
Loop 56 at its intersection with US-75

The entire route is in Okmulgee, Okmulgee County.

| mi | km | Destinations | Notes |
|---|---|---|---|
| 0.00 | 0.00 | US 62 (New Morris Highway) | Southern terminus |
| 3.7 | 6.0 | US 75 (Wood Drive) | Northern terminus; road continues west as Fairgrounds Road |
1.000 mi = 1.609 km; 1.000 km = 0.621 mi
