= Okmulgee Northern Railway =

Overview
- Headquarters: Okmulgee, Oklahoma
- Reporting mark: ON
- Locale: Oklahoma
- Dates of operation: 1916–1964

Technical
- Track gauge: 4 ft 8 1/2 in (1,435 mm) standard gauge
- Length: 12.041 miles (19.378 km)

The Okmulgee Northern Railway Company (ON), originally the Coalton Railway, was a shortline rail carrier in Okmulgee County, Oklahoma. It was in operation from 1916 to 1964.

== History ==
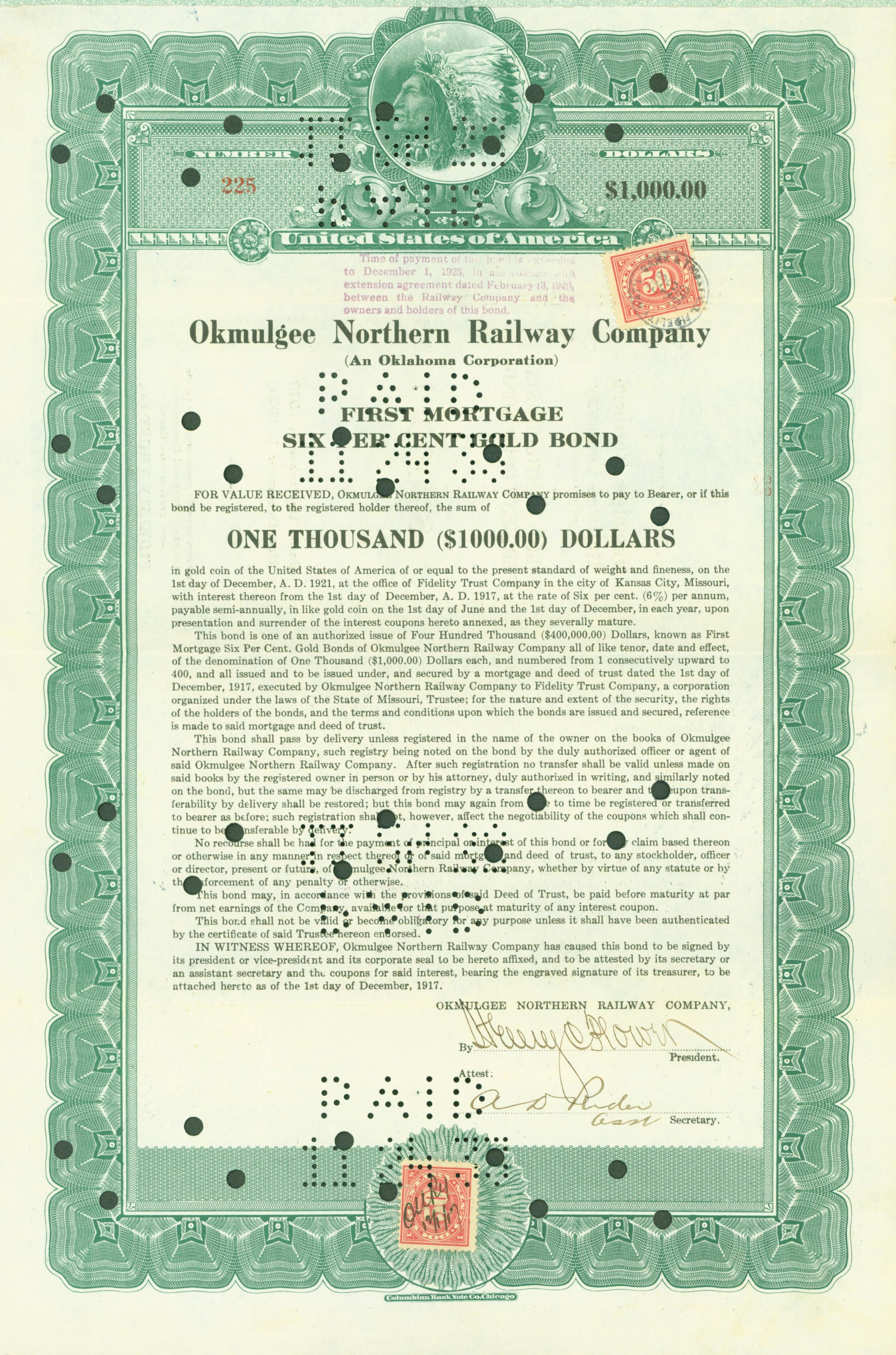
Gold Bond of the Okmulgee Northern Railway Company, issued 1 December 1917

The line was chartered December 15, 1915 under Oklahoma law, and completed October 8, 1916. A snapshot of the company as of June 30, 1919 shows it with its headquarters in the city of Okmulgee, 1.710 miles of yard tracks and sidings, plus a single-track, standard-gauge mainline of 10.331 miles extending south from Okmulgee into the Deep Fork area. The line traversed gently rolling terrain, with only one metal bridge which featured a 166-foot through-truss span on two pile piers. From Deep Fork, the company had overhead trackage rights on 11.6 miles of the Missouri, Oklahoma and Gulf Railway Company—later reorganized as the Kansas, Oklahoma and Gulf Railway (KO&G)-- to Henryetta, Oklahoma, limited to passenger operations. The line, primarily a freight-hauler, had one steam locomotive and only owned three passenger cars. The company interchanged with the KO&G at Deep Fork, and with the St. Louis–San Francisco Railway (Frisco) at Okmulgee. The company was valued by the Interstate Commerce Commission as of 1919 at $321,000 for rate-making purposes.

The line ran south from Okmulgee along the Deep Fork River carrying coal out of the Dewar, Coalton and Schulter producing areas. The Thirty-sixth annual report of the Department of Mines and Minerals from 1943 shows combined production by coal companies in Coalton and Dewar of over 30,000 tons annually. Production peaked in the Henryetta mining area in 1948, with number of mines shutting down thereafter.

The ICC authorized abandonment of ON's entire line on May 18, 1964, and the railroad ceased operations on June 27, 1964. All assets were sold to the Frisco.

== Legacy ==
One mile of the railroad's old right-of-way is now incorporated in the Railroad Trail and River Overlook at the Deep Fork National Wildlife Refuge.

One of the ON's former steam locomotives is on static display at the Belton, Grandview and Kansas City Railroad, a museum and heritage railroad in Belton, Missouri. Built by the American Locomotive Company (ALCO) Cooke facility in 1923, the engine is a 2-8-0 Consolidation. Due to be sold to Cuba after construction, it was stored for many years after the order was cancelled, and ended up being sold to the ON in 1933. Numbered as engine #5 and nicknamed “Tommy,” it was retired from service in 1958.
