= Sunrise, Okfuskee County, Oklahoma =

Coordinates: 35°31′14″N 96°07′23″W

Sunrise is an unincorporated place in Okfuskee County, Oklahoma, at an elevation of 830 feet. It is located about 17 miles southwest of the city of Okmulgee, Oklahoma, and directly south of Dripping Springs Lake.

This is not to be confused with the community of Sunrise in Okmulgee County, Oklahoma, which is located just to the east of Dewar, Oklahoma.
