= Sunrise, Okmulgee County, Oklahoma =

Unincorporated community in Oklahoma, United States

Coordinates: 35°27′22″N 95°55′04″W

Sunrise is an unincorporated place in Okmulgee County, Oklahoma, at an elevation of 610 feet. It is located just to the east of Dewar.

This is not to be confused with the community of Sunrise in Okfuskee County, Oklahoma, about 17 miles southwest of the city of Okmulgee and directly south of Dripping Springs Lake.
