= Coalton, Oklahoma =

Populated place in Oklahoma, US

Coordinates: 35°29′51″N 95°56′21″W

Coalton is a populated place in Okmulgee County, Oklahoma. It is less than 11 miles south of the City of Okmulgee, and just east of US Route 62/US Route 75. In the Henryetta Coal Formation coal-mining region and an oil-producing area, the town in its heyday had its own newspaper, The Coalton Enterprise, and was along the route of the shortline Coalton Railway, later called the Okmulgee Northern Railway, which operated from Okmulgee south along the Deep Fork River carrying the coal out of the Coalton, Schulter and Dewar producing areas from 1916 to 1964. The Thirty-sixth annual report of the Department of Mines and Minerals from 1943 shows production by two coal companies in Coalton—Coalton Coal Company and Davis Coal Company—of almost 17,000 tons annually.
