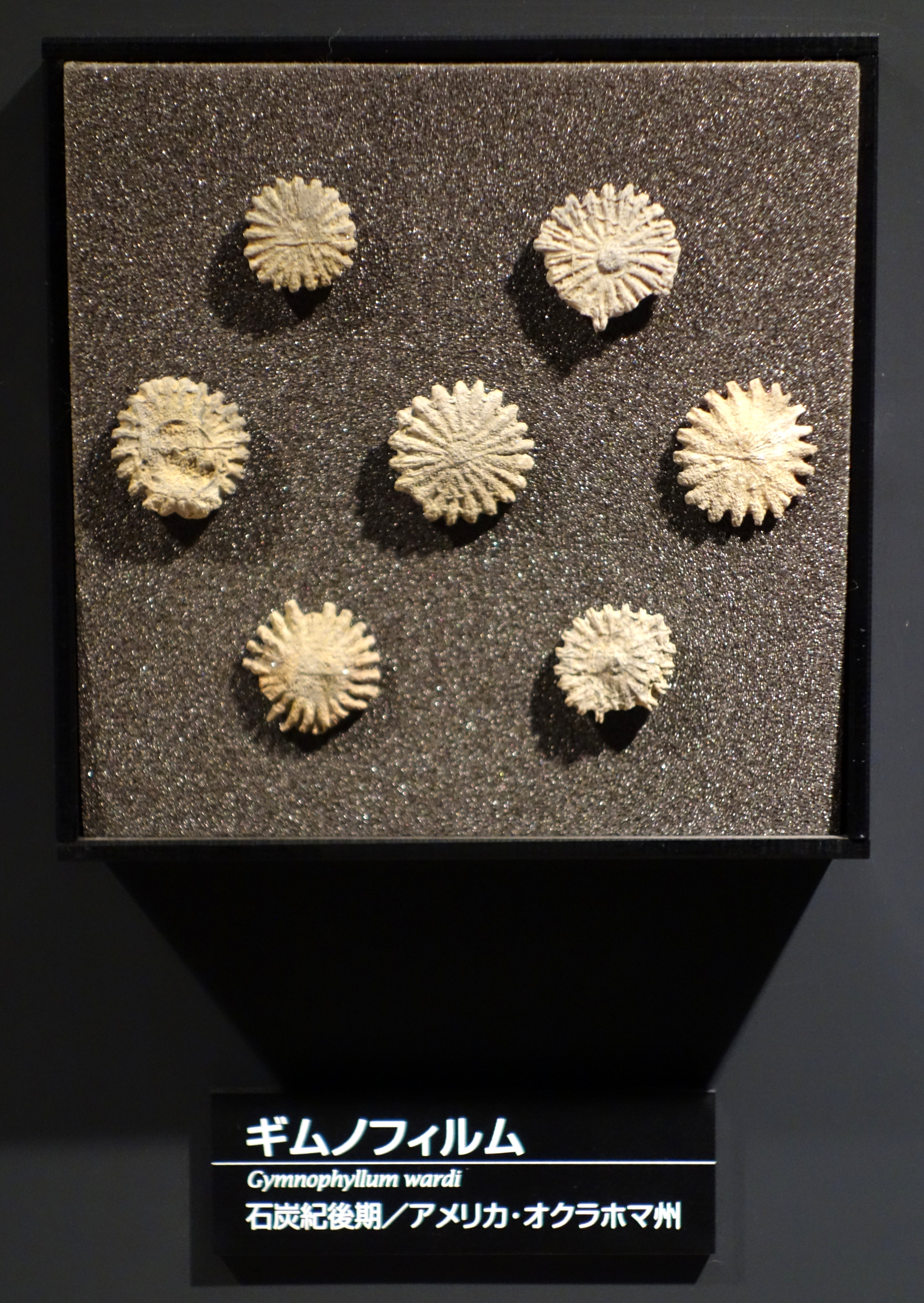

Scientific classification
- Kingdom: Animalia
- Phylum: Cnidaria
- Subphylum: Anthozoa
- Class: †Rugosa
- Order: †Stauriida
- Genus: †Gymnophyllum
- Species: †G. wardi

Binomial name
- †Gymnophyllum wardi Howell, 1945

= Gymnophyllum =

Gymnophyllum wardi Temporal range: 318.1–299 Ma Pennsylvanian

Extinct genus of corals

Gymnophyllum wardi, commonly known as button coral, is an extinct coral from the Pennsylvanian part of the Carboniferous period. The fossils are found in relatively few places worldwide; most specimens are known from the upper part of the Wewoka Formation in and around Lake Okmulgee in Okmulgee State Park or the adjoining Dripping Springs State Park in Okmulgee County, Oklahoma in the United States.

G. wardi was first described by B.F. Howell in 1945, and is the only species in the genus Gymnophyllum. Many specimens of G. wardi are known, ranging in age from very young and immature to very old individuals. The individuals are described as "flat disclike solitary corallites", with exposed septa almost everywhere on the base, though not at the peduncle in the center, which is depressed. The top of the coral disc has a "large smooth axial area" and shorter septa. The youngest individuals have long septa, which can be somewhat crooked; the axial center has a deep fossula which contains the cardinal septum, which is thick and short. Older corals have a large axial area with the cardinal fossula and projecting septa at their edges, making them appear like a "toothed wheel".

In mature specimens, the fossula has almost disappeared and the top axial area is smooth and wide with septa that project slightly starting outside this area, and continuing almost to the basal peduncle, which is small. The oldest specimens are flat, have "short deformed septa" and no fossula, but do have a theca between the basal septa. Some specimens consist of two corralites joined together. All of these physical characteristics are similar to those of some other fossil coral species, like Hadrophyllum orbignyi. G. wardi and other similar fossil corals may even have been able to move along the sea floor or right themselves if tipped over.

Samples of G. wardi can be 15.5 millimetres (0.61 in) in diameter. They are found in outcrops of shale from the Wewoka formation, and may be collected along the shores of Lake Okmulgee by getting in the shallow water, "washing the edge with a container of water, and watching carefully for little discs freed from the sediment". The University of Kansas Biodiversity Research Center has a large collection of fossils. Park rangers have discouraged fossil collection in the park; fossils are on display in the park's shop and are available for sale from some dealers.
