= Coalton =

Coalton may refer to a place in the United States:

- Coalton, Illinois
- Coalton, Kentucky
- Coalton, Ohio
- Coalton, Oklahoma
- Coalton, West Virginia
