= St. Anthony's Catholic Church (Okmulgee, Oklahoma) =

Historic church in Oklahoma, United States

- U.S. National Register of Historic Places
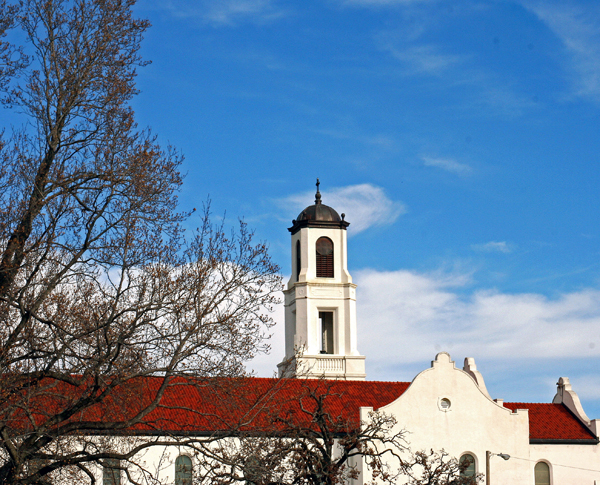

- Location within Oklahoma Location within the United States
- Location: 515 S. Morton St., Okmulgee, Oklahoma
- Coordinates: 35°37′6″N 95°58′20″W
- Area: less than one acre
- Built: 1927
- Built by: Dennehy Construction Co.
- Architect: Monnot & Reid
- Architectural style: Mission/spanish Revival
- NRHP reference No.: 83002112
- Added to NRHP: July 14, 1983

St. Anthony's Catholic Church is a historic Spanish Colonial Revival-style church at 515 S. Morton Street in Okmulgee, Oklahoma, United States. It was built in 1927 and added to the National Register of Historic Places in 1983.

The interior features tall, smooth-shafted Corinthian columns topped with capitals enriched with acanthus leaves, caulicoli, and molded abacus. It also contains an 18 feet (5.5 m) high Carrara marble and stone altar imported from Tuscany soon after the church was built.
