= College of the Muscogee Nation =

Community college in Okmulgee, Oklahoma, US

Coordinates: 35°38′07″N 95°56′11″W

- Motto in English: Preserving the Past, Cultivating Futures.
- Type: Public tribal community college
- Established: 2004
- Affiliations: American Indian Higher Education Consortium
- President: Dr. Monte Randall
- Dean: Mekko Tyner, Krystal Wind
- Students: 127 men and 191 women (2016–2017 school year)
- Location: Okmulgee, Oklahoma, United States
- Campus: Rural
- Website: cmn.edu

College of the Muscogee Nation (CMN) is a public tribal community college in Okmulgee, Oklahoma, the capital of the Muscogee (Creek) Nation.

== History ==
It was established in 2004 by an act of the Muscogee (Creek) Nation National Council. On 7 November 2009, Muscogee (Creek) citizens voted in support of the College of the Muscogee Nation becoming a constitutional college. Passage of the referendum resulted in the College Board of Regents becoming Article XIII in the Constitution of the Muscogee (Creek) Nation.

The college is a member of the American Indian Higher Education Consortium, and was designated as a 1994 Land-Grant institution in the 2014 Farm Bill. As of November 2020, 90% of the faculty were reported to be "American Indian or Alaska Native" and 60% were reported as female.

CMN was granted Initial Accreditation by the Higher Learning Commission in November 2016. The accreditation was renewed 15 December 2020, with the next accreditation review scheduled for 2026–2027.

== Governance ==
The Board of Regents is the governing board of the College of the Muscogee Nation, guaranteed by the Muscogee (Creek) Nation Constitution and in the College Charter. The CMN's governance consists of a five-member board of regents of Muscogee citizens who meet monthly. Board members are nominated by the Principal Chief and approved by the National Council.

== Academics ==
Undergraduate demographics as of Fall 2023
Race and ethnicity	Total
American Indian/Alaska Native	74%
Two or more races	18%
Hispanic	4%
White	3%
Economic diversity
Low-income (Note: The percentage of students who received an income-based federal Pell grant intended for low-income students.)	42%
Affluent (Note: The percentage of students who are a part of the American middle class at the bare minimum.)	58%

CMN offers general education and Tribal-specific courses. CMN students can earn associate degrees or certificates in programs that focus on needs or interests of the Muscogee Nation, including Mvskoke studies and the Mvskoke language. It is one of seven tribal colleges in the U.S. to offer a degree related to tribal administration.

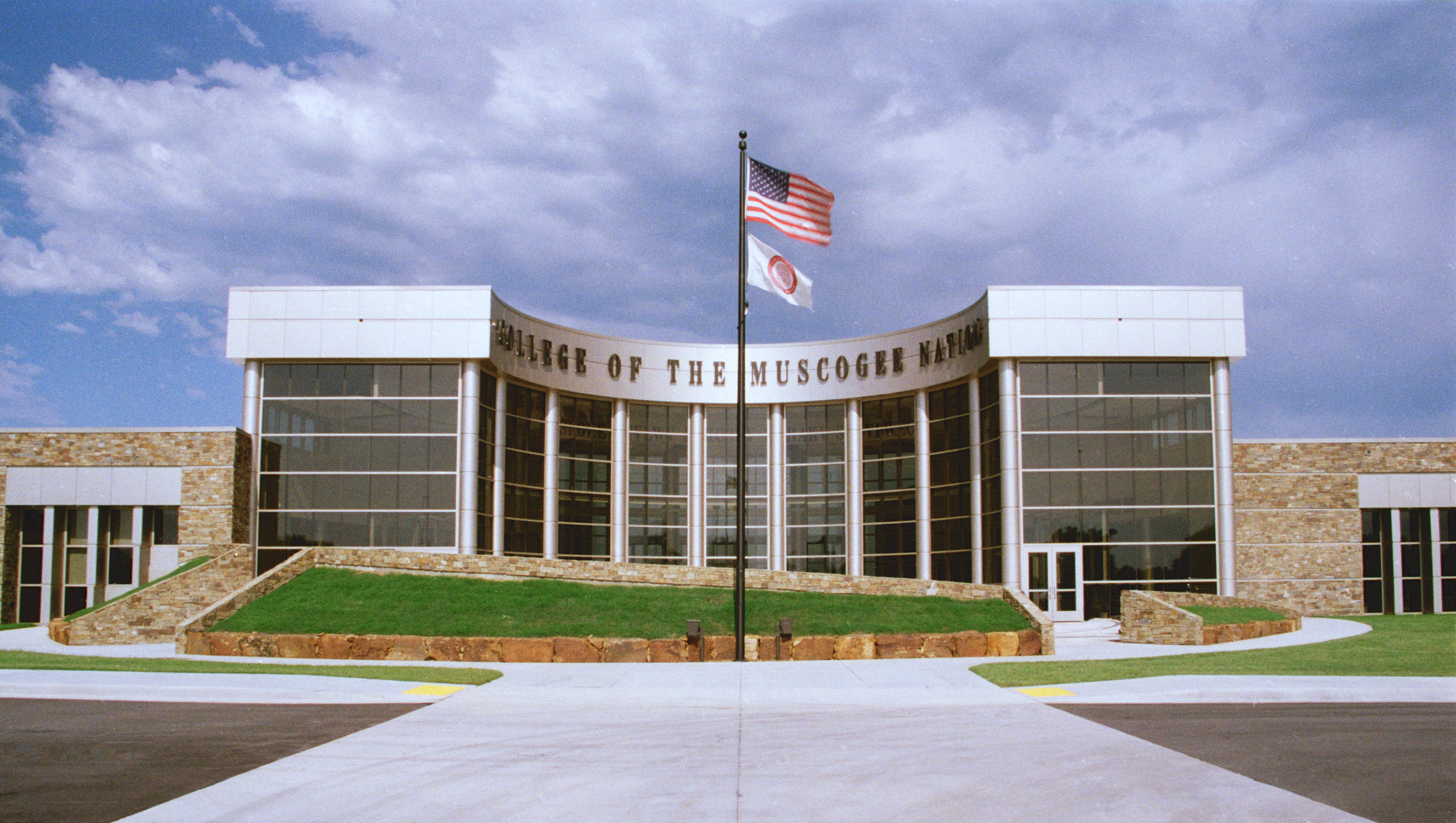
College of the Muscogee Nation

== Campus ==
The college is located on a 37-acre campus on Loop 56 in Okmulgee, Oklahoma. Included on campus is the educational and administrative facility, student housing, a Student Center, and cultural community garden.
