= KOKL =

Radio station in Okmulgee, Oklahoma

- Okmulgee, Oklahoma; United States
- Frequency: 1240 kHz
- Branding: 106.3FM & 1240AM The Brew

Programming
- Format: Classic hits

Ownership
- Owner: Third Day Broadcasting, Inc.

History
- First air date: October 1937 (as KHBG)
- Former call signs: KHBG (1937–1959)
- Call sign meaning: "Okmulgee" and "Oklahoma"

Technical information
- Licensing authority: FCC
- Facility ID: 55496
- Class: C
- Power: 1,000 watts unlimited
- Transmitter coordinates: 35°36′31″N 95°58′19″W
- Translator: 106.3 K292HF (Okmulgee)

Links
- Public license information: Public file; LMS
- Webcast: Listen live
- Website: listentothebrew.com

KOKL (1240 AM) is a radio station broadcasting a classic hits format in Okmulgee, Oklahoma, United States. The station is owned by Third Day Broadcasting, Inc., and broadcasts from studios in the historic Kress building in downtown Okmulgee.

== History ==
=== KHBG ===
In 1936, three groups applied to build a new radio station on 1210 kHz in Okmulgee, the city's first. Two represented local newspapers, the Record and Daily Times, while the third was the Okmulgee Broadcasting Company. The newspapers dropped out of the running that April, with the Times stating that it felt local advertising support would be insufficient to sustain the outlet, especially if it could not broadcast at night. Taking the call letters KHBG, representing founding owner Harry B. Greaves, the new outlet signed on in the first week of October. It broadcast during the daytime only with 100 watts.

Two years after putting the station on air, the founding owners of Okmulgee Broadcasting Company transferred their shares to two families with involvement on the station staff, the Buford and Ross families, in 1939. The new owners upgraded the station to broadcast with 250 watts and add nighttime service in 1939; two years later, NARBA reallocation moved it to its present 1240 kHz. The station gained its first live network hookup in 1944 when it affiliated with the Mutual Broadcasting System.

A decade after dropping its bid to build a radio station, the Daily Times bought KHBG in 1948 for $125,000, after the paper's owner, Donald W. Reynolds, had filed to build a new station there. Reynolds pledged to the Federal Communications Commission that the station's operations would be separate with those of the newspaper and that the two businesses would compete in advertising sales.

While the transmitter had been located on 20th Street on the southern edge of town since going on air, the studios had moved around between three different downtown sites, including the historic Hotel Parkinson. Station operations moved in with the Times in 1951.

=== KOKL ===
On September 15, 1959, KHBG relaunched as KOKL—call letters representing both Okmulgee and Oklahoma—but retained its full-service format, playing a variety of music throughout the day. Four years later, Reynolds would make one last upgrade, being approved to increase the station's daytime power to 1,000 watts.

In 1964, Reynolds sold KOKL to J. William Brauer, an advertising executive, for $85,000; the station moved to the Enterprise Building on 6th Street after separating from the Times. The station's transmitter site was damaged in a 1971 brush fire.

Brauer sold the station to James R. "Bob" Brewer, who also owned stations in Claremore, Frederick, Elk City and Chickasha, in 1973. A sister station on FM, KLLS (94.3 FM), signed on May 24, 1976; it became an adult contemporary outlet, and KOKL settled into a country format. The FM station was sold to a group headed by former pro football player Ben Davis in 1989; the new owner upgraded and moved it into the Tulsa market on 94.1 MHz in 1990.

The station moved from the Enterprise Building to the Kress Building in 1997; during this time, it broadcast country music during the day and programming from American Family Radio during evening hours. In 2014, Bob retired, and his son Brooks purchased the station by way of Third Day Broadcasting. Music programming concentrates on artists of the 60’s, 70’s and 80’s.

== FM translator ==
KOKL is also broadcast on the following FM translator, which began broadcasting in 2018.

Broadcast translator for KOKL
Call sign	Frequency	City of license	FID	ERP (W)	HAAT	Class	FCC info
K292HF	106.3 FM	Okmulgee, Oklahoma	200672	250	92 m (302 ft)	D	LMS
