= Jim House =

American politician and farmer (1948–2018)

Member of the Arkansas House of Representatives from the 89th district
- In office 2007–2011
- Succeeded by: Charlie Collins

Personal details
- Born: September 14, 1948 Okmulgee, Oklahoma, U.S.
- Died: December 5, 2018 (aged 70) Washington County, Arkansas, U.S.
- Party: Democratic
- Children: 2
- Education: University of Arkansas
- Occupation: farrier, farmer

Military service
- Allegiance: United States
- Branch/service: United States Army
- Rank: Sergeant

James William House (September 14, 1948 – December 5, 2018) was an American farmer and a Democratic politician from the U.S. state of Arkansas.

== Biography ==
House was born in Okmulgee, Oklahoma, and moved in 1957 to Washington County, Arkansas, where he resided in the county seat of Fayetteville. In 1971, House received his Bachelor of Science degree in agriculture from the University of Arkansas. He served in the United States Army in 1971 and 1972 and was stationed in South Vietnam. He was commissioned a sergeant. From 1974 to 2000, House worked for the Arkansas Department of Health as an area manager. He was a farmer and a farrier. House served for two terms in the Arkansas House of Representatives from 2007 to 2011. House died on December 5, 2018, in a tractor mishap at his farm in Washington County. He was 70.
