= Charlie Collins (politician) =

American politician (born 1962)

Member of the Arkansas House of Representatives from the 89th district
- In office 2011–2019
- Preceded by: Jon Eubanks (moved to District 74)
- Succeeded by: Denise Garner

Personal details
- Born: November 30, 1962 (age 63)
- Party: Republican
- Education: Franklin High School (Livonia, Michigan) United States Naval Academy George Washington University
- Occupation: Businessman

Charlie Collins (born November 30, 1962) is a businessman and Republican politician in Arkansas. Collins served four terms in the Arkansas House of Representatives for District 84, which encompasses part of Washington County near Fayetteville. In 2014, Collins briefly sought the Republican nomination for Lieutenant Governor of Arkansas. Following reelection in 2016, Collins sponsored legislation to allow anyone over age 21 to carry guns on college campuses and other public places. Controversial among the University of Arkansas community within District 84, Collins lost his reelection bid in 2018.

== Biography ==
=== Early life ===
He graduated from Franklin High School in Livonia, Michigan. He graduated in 1985 from the United States Naval Academy in Annapolis, Maryland. He received a master's degree in 1986 in quantitative economics from George Washington University in Washington, D.C.

=== Career ===
He started his career at Procter & Gamble in 1990 as a brand manager in Cincinnati, Ohio. He came to Arkansas in 1996. He later worked for Eastman Kodak as vice president of sales, as team leader at Wal-Mart and Sam's Club, and as vice president of the H. J. Heinz Company in Arkansas. In 2005, he joined Crown Partners Executive Search, LLC, a recruiting and consulting firm.

=== State representative ===
He has served as a state representative for District 84 since 2011 and he was re-elected in 2012 and 2014. The position was formerly District 89 and held by a Democrat Jim House, who Collins defeated in 2010. During his first term, he was a member of the House Agriculture, Forestry and Economic Development Committee, the House Revenue and Taxation Committee, and the Legislative Joint Auditing Committee, where he was vice chair of the Subcommittee on Educational Institutions. In his second term, he is a member of the Legislative Joint Audit Committee, Insurance and Commerce Committee, and Chairman of the House Revenue and Taxation Committee.

He has also proposed a bill to reduce the state income tax.

==== Act 562 of 2017 ====
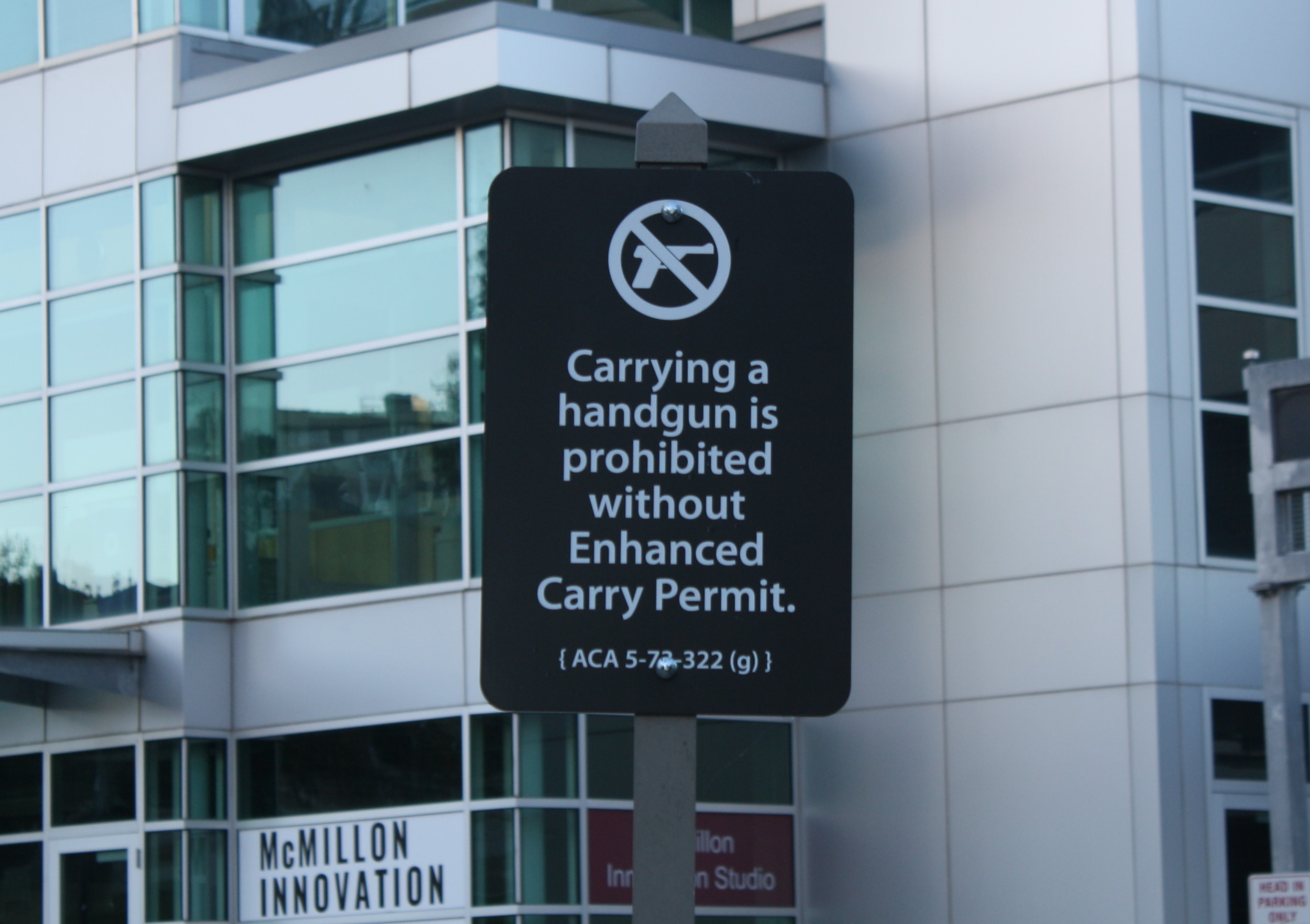
Sign posted on UA campus pursuant to Act 562 of 2017

In the 92nd Arkansas General Assembly, Collins sponsored a bill to allow faculty at public universities (including the University of Arkansas within District 84) to use concealed carry handguns on campus as long as they have a Firearms license. The bill caused major debates on the state's open carry law and the Second Amendment.

Every public college opposed the bill, including UA Chancellor Joseph E. Steinmetz. Gun advocates in the Arkansas General Assembly succeeded in expanding Collins' initial proposal to almost all public places, including the courthouses, bars, churches, and sporting events. The expanded measure ultimately became law as Act 562 of 2017, with exemptions for sporting events, the state hospital, and the University of Arkansas for Medical Sciences (UAMS).

Collins was unseated in his bid for a fifth legislative term in the general election held on November 6, 2018. Democrat Denise Garner outpolled Collins by 1,440 votes, 7,456 (55.3 percent) to 6,016 (44.7 percent).

=== Personal life ===
He is married to Leeann Collins, and they have two sons and two daughters. They live in Fayetteville, Arkansas. He is a Protestant.

Preceded by John Eubanks (moved to District 74)	Arkansas State Representative for District 84 (Washington County); 2011–2019	Succeeded by Denise Garner
