= Angela Barker-Jones =

Cherokee jurist (1969–2018)

Cherokee Nation Supreme Court Justice
- In office January 2, 2013 – July 31, 2018
- Appointed by: Bill John Baker
- Preceded by: Darell Matlock
- Succeeded by: Lee W. Paden

Personal details
- Born: Angela Barker; July 29, 1969 Okmulgee, Oklahoma, U.S.
- Died: July 31, 2018 (aged 49)
- Citizenship: Cherokee Nation; United States
- Children: 3
- Education: Northeastern State University; University of Tulsa

Angela Marie Barker-Jones (July 29, 1969 – July 31, 2018) was a Cherokee jurist who served as a justice on the Cherokee Nation supreme court. She was the second woman to hold this position in the court's history.

== Biography ==
Barker-Jones was born on July 29, 1969, in Okmulgee, Oklahoma. Her mother, Dianne Barker-Harrold, was an attorney, and her husband, Stephen, led dental programs within the Cherokee Nation health system. She graduated from Tahlequah High School in 1987 and received a B.S. in criminal justice from Northeastern State University in 1991, where Barker-Jones graduated summa cum laude. In 1995, she earned her J.D. from the University of Tulsa College of Law, graduating in the top ten percent of her class and being named to the Order of the Curule Chair.

Barker-Jones began her legal career as an assistant district attorney for Muskogee County from 1995 to 1996, later serving in the same role for Cherokee County in 2007. She later became a public defender in Cherokee and Adair counties, where she focused on ensuring fair legal representation for all clients, particularly juveniles. She maintained a private law practice in Tahlequah, Oklahoma, where she worked on criminal and civil cases. Barker-Jones served as a hearing officer for the Cherokee Nation's administrative appeals board and was a member of the tribe's employee appeals board.

On January 2, 2013, Barker-Jones was sworn in as a Cherokee Nation supreme court justice after her appointment was approved by the tribal council in December 2012. Her appointment marked her as the second woman to serve on the court, following Stacy Leeds, and the first to be appointed under principal chief Bill John Baker’s administration. Barker-Jones was 43 at the time and began a 10-year term on the five-member Supreme Court, replacing justice Darell Matlock, whose term expired at the end of 2012. During her five and a half years on the bench, she interpreted Cherokee Nation laws and oversaw cases involving child custody, the Indian Child Welfare Act, citizenship, and other legal matters. Lee W. Paden was selected to fill the remainder of Barker-Jones' term set to run until December 31, 2022.

Barker-Jones was married to Stephen Jones, with whom she had three children. She and her husband owned and operated The Grill, a restaurant in Tahlequah. She served on the Tahlequah Main Street Association board and provided pro bono legal services to local organizations. Barker-Jones died on July 31, 2018, at the age of 49, after a cancer diagnosis.

== See also ==
- List of Native American jurists
- Native American women in politics
