= Denise Garner =

American politician

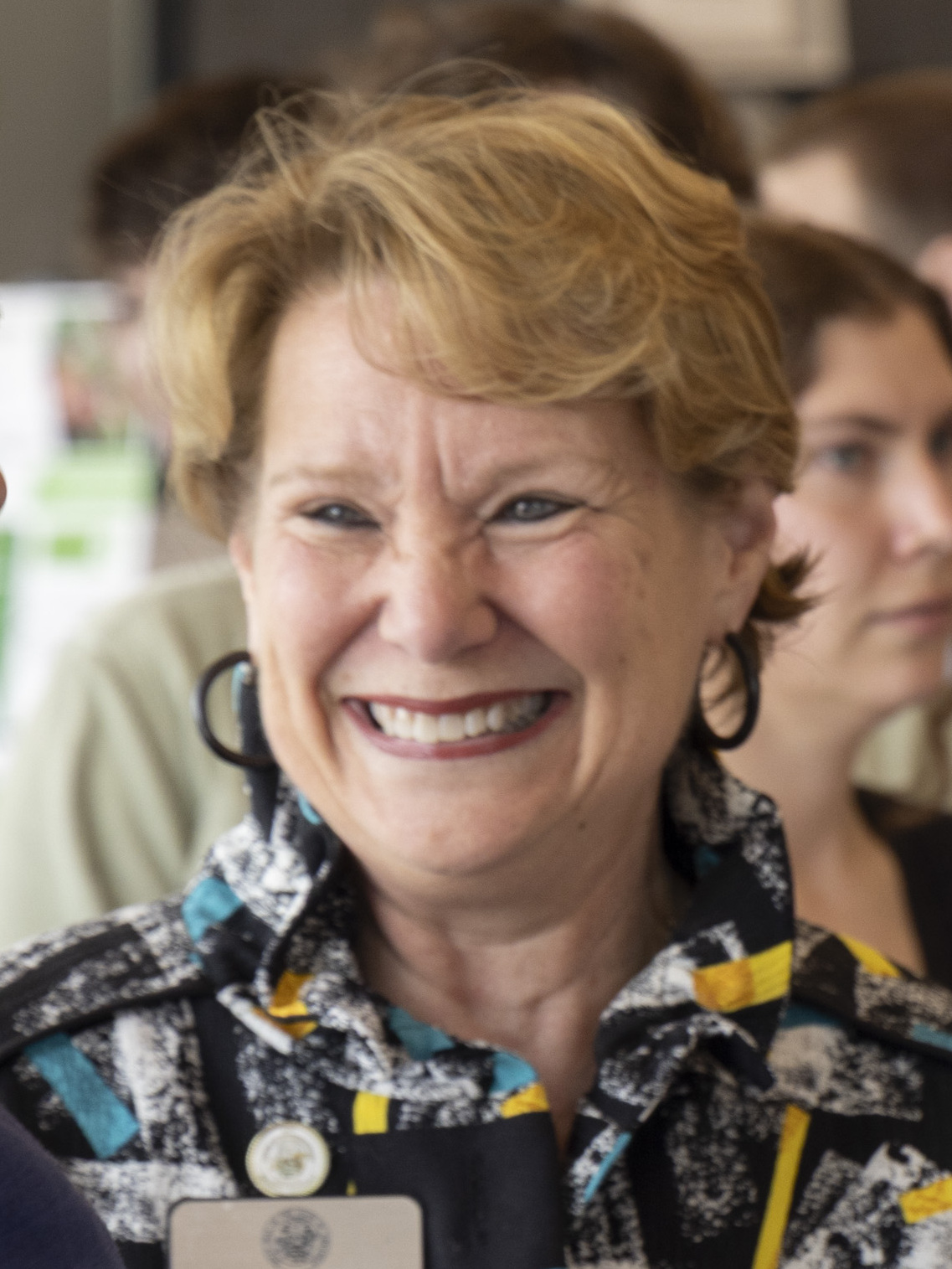
- Garner in 2025

Member of the Arkansas House of Representatives from the 20th district
- Incumbent
- Assumed office January 14, 2019
- Preceded by: Charlie Collins
- Succeeded by: Max Deitchler (elect)

Personal details
- Born: December 9, 1956 (age 69)
- Party: Democratic
- Spouse: Hershel Garner

Denise Firmin Garner (born December 9, 1956) is an American politician serving as a member of the Arkansas House of Representatives from District 20, covering parts of Washington County and the town of Fayetteville. Garner was first elected in 2019 to the district then known as District 84, before redistricting changed the numbering of this district in 2021.

Garner is a retired registered nurse practitioner, small business owner and philanthropist, with a focus on education, health and food security related causes.

== Political career ==
=== Election ===
Garner was elected in the general election on November 6, 2018, winning 55 percent of the vote over 45 percent of Republican candidate Charlie Collins.

Garner was reelected in 2022. She is running for the Arkansas Senate in 2024 in District 30 to succeed term-limited Senator Greg Leding.
