= Belton, Grandview and Kansas City Railroad =

Railroad and museum in Belton, Missouri, US

Coordinates: 38°48′46″N 94°31′54″W

The Belton Missouri Historical Railroad, formerly known as the Belton, Grandview and Kansas City Railroad (SHRX), is a short line passenger railroad and museum located in Belton, Missouri. It operates as a heritage railroad, on what was once the St. Louis and San Francisco Railway (Frisco), on the Kansas City to Springfield branch. With the merger of the Frisco with the Burlington Northern, the line was partially sold to the Kansas City Southern Railway north of 155th Street. The north of the line is used once a year when tree trimming/weed spraying takes place, and the tracks are bad though can still can be used. The bridge is still there past Markey Road but with missing ties, while the southernmost portion from Peculiar, MO. to Clinton, MO. has been scrapped and abandoned. This left the remaining trackage of a few miles connecting Grandview and Belton, Missouri. The railroad currently operates a 1956 EMD GP9 locomotive, which is used to pull an excursion train. Also included in the railroad's collection are various locomotives, cars and equipment.

== History ==
The Smoky Hill Railway and Historical Society was formed in 1964 to take donation of an out-of-service steam locomotive, a 1918 coal-fired 2-10-0 Russian decapod built by Baldwin. The engine, originally sent to the Frisco and numbered as 1632, had been sold in 1952 to Eagle Picher Mining Company at Miami, Oklahoma, along with four similar locomotives. Eagle-Picher retired the units in 1957, and by 1964 was looking to donate each somewhere. Smoky Hill took donation of 1632, and stored the unit at Ottawa, Kansas.

Smoky Hill started a railway museum in 1964 at the Trough-Nichols siding in Lenexa, Kansas, followed by the "house track" in downtown Lenexa until 1973. Expansion forced it to move north of downtown Kansas City, Missouri, at 226 West 3rd Street to the Kansas City Southern "old team track" in the River Quay area, where it became The Kansas City Railroad Museum. It was forced to distribute out its collection to Richards-Gebaur Air Force Base and five other locations in October 1980. It relocated engine 1632 to Belton, Missouri (part of the Kansas City metropolitan area) in 1991, and consolidated there about 1995 where it started operations with reporting mark SHRX. The Belton Missouri Historical Railroad was formed to be a short line passenger railroad and demonstration museum as a project of Smoky Hill.

As of July 2013, the museum roster included 2 static steam locomotives, 2 diesel locomotives, 6 freight cars, 3 cabooses, 6 special service (maintenance of way) cars, and 3 passenger cars. Among the more notable acquisitions include:

- 1918 Baldwin 2-10-0 steam locomotive, former St. Louis-San Francisco Railway #1632 (static display)
- 1923 ALCO-Cooke 2-8-0 steam locomotive, former Okmulgee Northern Railway Company #5, named “Tommy” (static display)
- 1956 EMD GP9 diesel locomotive, former Huron and Eastern Railway #102 (operational)
- 1939 Plymouth Locomotive Works ML-8 switcher locomotive (temporarily non-operational)
- Kansas City Southern lightweight observation car "Hospitality"
