= Oklahoma State Highway 27 =

State highway in Oklahoma, United States

State Highway 27

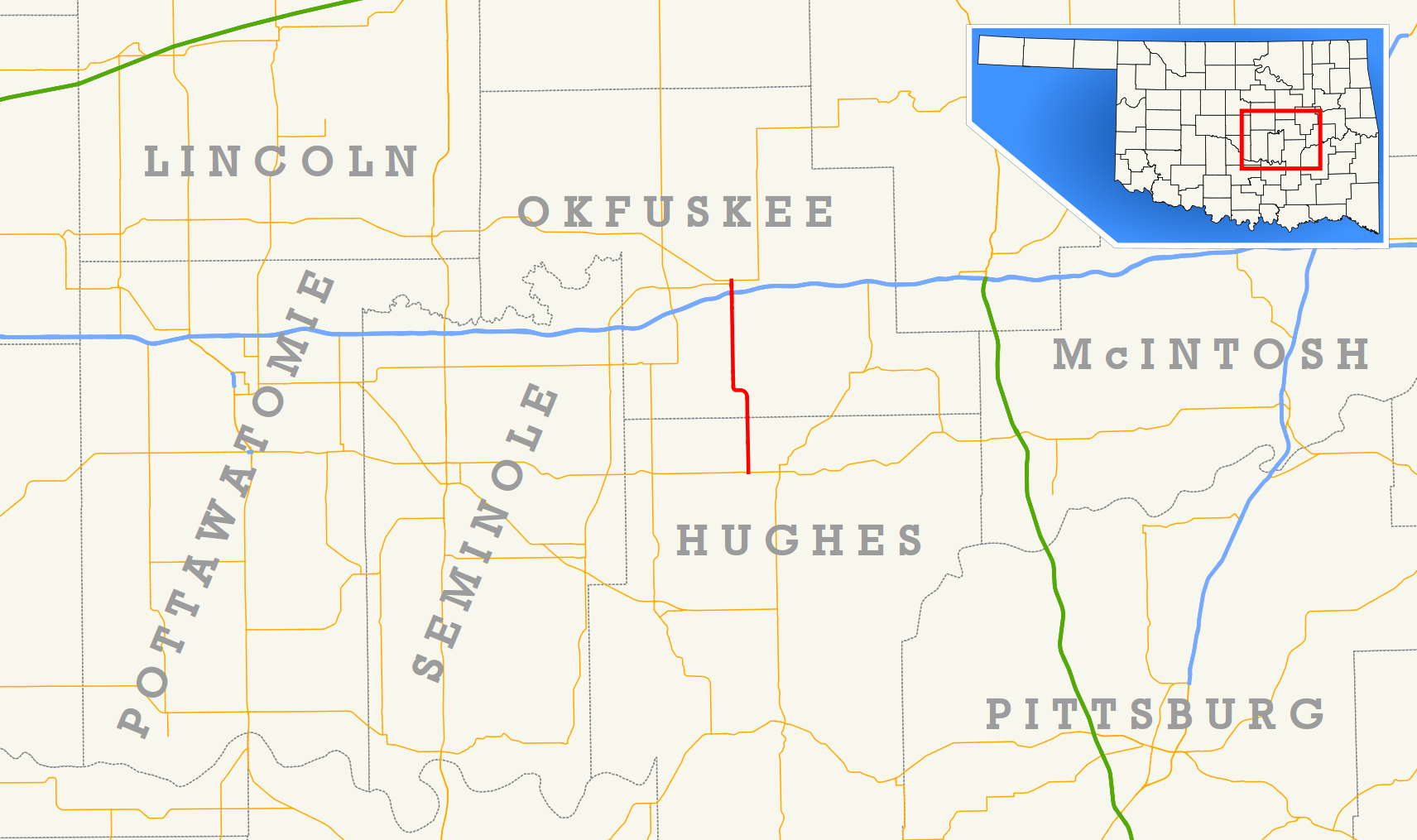

Route information
- Maintained by ODOT
- Length: 14.7 mi (23.7 km)
- Existed: ca. 1947 – 1956; ca. 1958–present

Major junctions
- South end: SH-9 west of Wetumka
- I-40 / US 62 near Okemah
- North end: US 62 / SH-56 in Okemah

Location
- Country: United States
- State: Oklahoma

Highway system
- Oklahoma State Highway System; Interstate; US; State; Turnpikes
← SH-26	→ SH-28

State Highway 27 (abbreviated SH-27) is a state highway in east-central Oklahoma. It has an extent of 14.7 miles (23.7 km) from south to north in Hughes and Okfuskee Counties. There are no letter-suffixed spur highways branching from SH-27.

SH-27 was first added to the state highway system in the late 1940s, but was removed from state control for approximately two years. Around 1958 it was returned to the highway system. Over the course of the highway's history, it was upgraded from a dirt and gravel connector route to a fully paved highway. The route was realigned in the mid-1990s, changing its southern end from US-75 north of Wetumka to SH-9 west of Wetumka. The route's northern terminus, at US-62 in Okemah, has remained constant throughout its history.

== Route description ==
State Highway 27 begins at SH-9, 2.3 miles (3.7 km) west of Wetumka. From this terminus, SH-27 proceeds due north. It passes approximately one mile (1.6 km) west of Lake Wetumka. The route spends a total of 4.02 miles (6.47 km) in Hughes County before crossing the line into Okfuskee County.

In Okfuskee County, SH-27 diverges from its due north heading, curving to the northwest briefly before crossing the North Canadian River. From the river, it is a straight shot into Okemah. On the south edge of town, SH-27 intersects I-40 at Exit 221. US-62 exits the interstate at this interchange, and follows SH-27 into town along Division. At Broadway, SH-56 joins the concurrency. Finally, at the north end of town, US-62 turns west on Columbia, while SH-56 turns east; SH-27 ends at this intersection.

== History ==
SH-27 first appears on the official state highway map in its 1948 edition, suggesting that it was created at some point in 1947. At this time, the route began in the north in Okemah, as it does presently; its southern terminus, however, was at US-75 north of Wetumka. In Hughes County, the highway consisted of gravel, switching to dirt in Okfuskee County. The highway existed in this state until 1956, when it was removed from the highway system.

By 1959, SH-27 had returned to the state highway system. The Okfuskee County portion of the route had been upgraded to gravel. In 1960, the route was realigned to cross the county line further east than it did previously. The segment of highway extending from approximately the North Canadian River crossing northward to Okemah was paved in 1967. By 1972, the entire route had been paved.

SH-27 remained unchanged throughout the remainder of the 1970s and 1980s. In 1994, the southernmost reaches of the route were realigned. Instead of ending at US-75 north of Wetumka, the highway's southern terminus was changed to fall at SH-9 west of town. This change left the highway in essentially the same configuration that it is today.

== Junction list ==
County	Location	mi	km	Destinations	Notes
Hughes		0.0	0.0	SH-9	Southern terminus
Okfuskee		13.8	22.2	I-40 / US 62	Southern end of US-62 concurrency, I-40 exit 221
Okfuskee	Okemah	14.4	23.2	SH-56	Southern end of SH-56 concurrency
Okfuskee	Okemah	14.7	23.7	US 62 / SH-56	Northern terminus, northern end of US-62/SH-56 concurrency
1.000 mi = 1.609 km; 1.000 km = 0.621 mi: Concurrency terminus
