= Max Deitchler =

American politician

Member-elect of the Arkansas House of Representatives from the 20th district
- Assuming office January 2027
- Succeeding: Denise Garner

Personal details
- Party: Democratic

Max Deitchler is an American politician. A member of the Democratic Party, he is the member-elect for the 20th district of the Arkansas House of Representatives.
