= Dewar, Oklahoma =

- Town
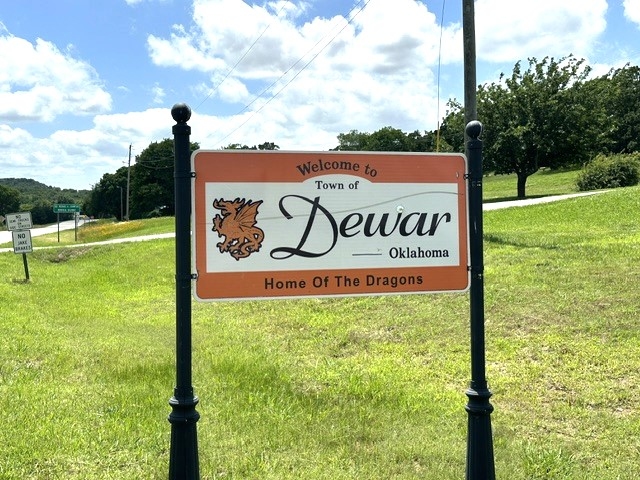
- Welcome sign in Dewar, June 2026

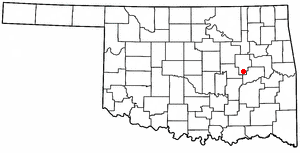
- Location of Dewar, Oklahoma
- Coordinates: 35°27′29″N 95°56′54″W
- Country: United States
- State: Oklahoma
- County: Okmulgee

Area
  - Total: 1.02 sq mi (2.64 km^{2})
  - Land: 1.01 sq mi (2.62 km^{2})
  - Water: 0.0077 sq mi (0.02 km^{2})
- Elevation: 646 ft (197 m)

Population (2020)
  - Total: 763
  - Density: 754.1/sq mi (291.17/km^{2})
- Time zone: UTC-6 (Central (CST))
  - Summer (DST): UTC-5 (CDT)
- ZIP code: 74431
- Area codes: 539/918
- FIPS code: 40-20500
- GNIS feature ID: 2412423

Dewar is a town in Okmulgee County, Oklahoma, United States. The population was 763 at the 2020 census. Founded in 1909 by workers for the Missouri, Oklahoma and Gulf Railway (MO&G), it was named for William Peter Dewar, a railroad official. It incorporated in 1909.

Dewar has a history with coal in the large Henryetta Coal Formation: the Thirty-sixth annual report of the Department of Mines and Minerals from 1943 shows production by four coal companies in Dewar— Berkey Coal Company, Coal Creek Coal Company, Dewar Coal Company, and Martin-Geary Coal Company—with a combined total of over 13,600 tons of coal annually. Dewar was along the route of the shortline Coalton Railway, later called the Okmulgee Northern Railway, which operated from Okmulgee south along the Deep Fork River carrying the coal out of the Dewar, Coalton and Schulter producing areas from 1916 to 1964.

== Geography ==
According to the United States Census Bureau, the town has a total area of 0.9 square miles (2.3 km^{2}), of which 0.9 square miles (2.3 km^{2}) is land and 1.08% is water.

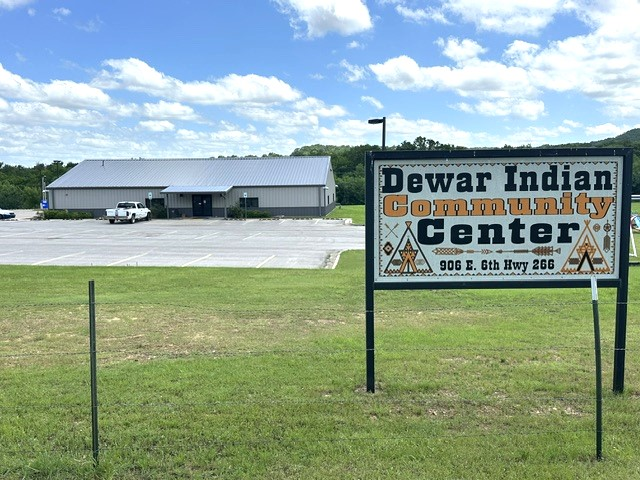
Dewar Indian Community Center in June of 2026

== Demographics ==
Historical population
Census	Pop.	Note	%±
1920	1,558		—
1930	994		−36.2%
1940	778		−21.7%
1950	1,015		30.5%
1960	817		−19.5%
1970	933		14.2%
1980	1,048		12.3%
1990	921		−12.1%
2000	919		−0.2%
2010	888		−3.4%
2020	763		−14.1%
U.S. Decennial Census

=== 2020 census ===
As of the 2020 census, Dewar had a population of 763. The median age was 41.4 years. 25.6% of residents were under the age of 18 and 22.4% of residents were 65 years of age or older. For every 100 females there were 96.1 males, and for every 100 females age 18 and over there were 90.0 males age 18 and over.

91.9% of residents lived in urban areas, while 8.1% lived in rural areas.

There were 285 households in Dewar, of which 30.2% had children under the age of 18 living in them. Of all households, 49.5% were married-couple households, 15.8% were households with a male householder and no spouse or partner present, and 29.5% were households with a female householder and no spouse or partner present. About 28.4% of all households were made up of individuals and 15.5% had someone living alone who was 65 years of age or older.

There were 333 housing units, of which 14.4% were vacant. The homeowner vacancy rate was 3.2% and the rental vacancy rate was 3.4%.

Racial composition as of the 2020 census
Race	Number	Percent
White	455	59.6%
Black or African American	8	1.0%
American Indian and Alaska Native	176	23.1%
Asian	0	0.0%
Native Hawaiian and Other Pacific Islander	0	0.0%
Some other race	7	0.9%
Two or more races	117	15.3%
Hispanic or Latino (of any race)	17	2.2%

=== 2000 census ===
As of the census of 2000, there were 919 people, 344 households, and 261 families residing in the town. The population density was 999.2 inhabitants per square mile (385.8/km^{2}). There were 386 housing units at an average density of 419.7 per square mile (162.0/km^{2}). The racial makeup of the town was 71.49% White, 0.33% African American, 19.80% Native American, 0.54% from other races, and 7.83% from two or more races. Hispanic or Latino of any race were 2.07% of the population.

There were 344 households, out of which 34.3% had children under the age of 18 living with them, 58.4% were married couples living together, 12.8% had a female householder with no husband present, and 24.1% were non-families. 23.0% of all households were made up of individuals, and 14.0% had someone living alone who was 65 years of age or older. The average household size was 2.67 and the average family size was 3.12.

In the town, the population was spread out, with 27.3% under the age of 18, 10.0% from 18 to 24, 24.8% from 25 to 44, 24.5% from 45 to 64, and 13.4% who were 65 years of age or older. The median age was 35 years. For every 100 females, there were 93.9 males. For every 100 females age 18 and over, there were 92.0 males.

The median income for a household in the town was $30,000, and the median income for a family was $35,417. Males had a median income of $27,625 versus $18,036 for females. The per capita income for the town was $12,188. About 11.5% of families and 15.2% of the population were below the poverty line, including 22.6% of those under age 18 and 17.4% of those age 65 or over.
