= Okmulgee Park =

Park in Oklahoma, United States

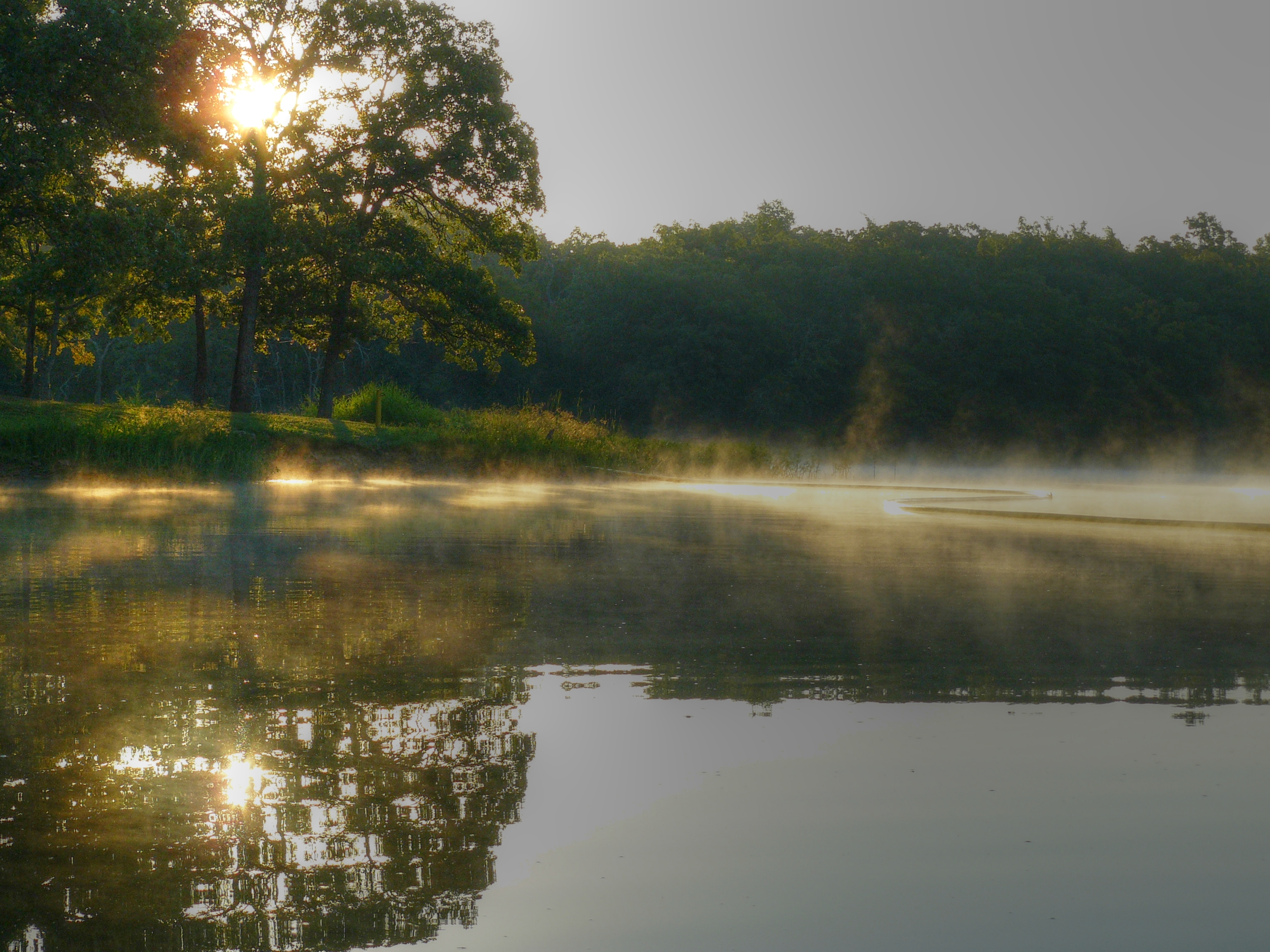

- Location within Oklahoma
- Location: Okmulgee County, Oklahoma, United States
- Coordinates: 35°36′01″N 96°03′35″W
- Area: 1,075 acres (4.35 km^{2})
- Governing body: City of Okmulgee
- Website: www.travelok.com/listings/view.profile/id.5520

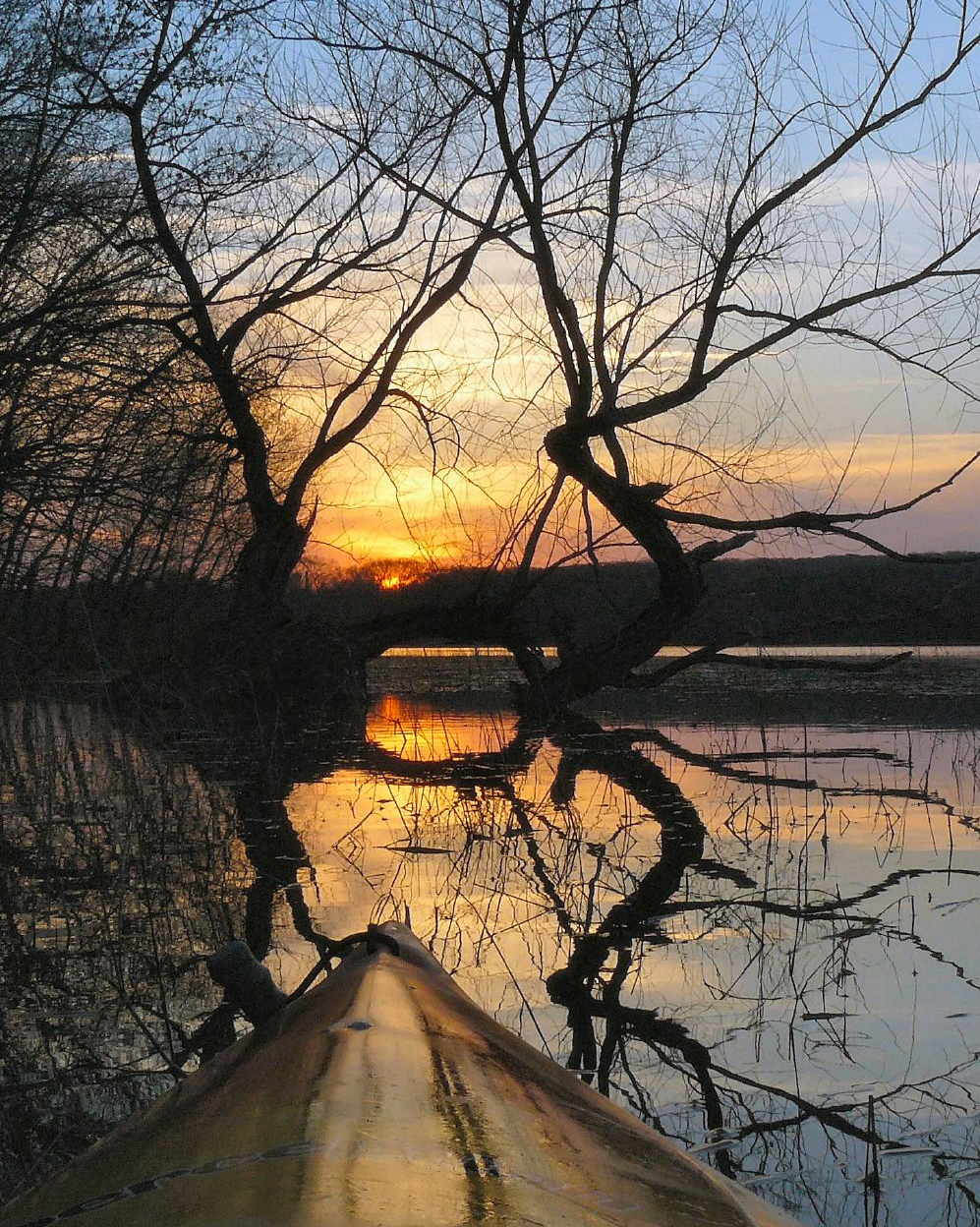
Sunset kayaking, Lake Okmulgee.

Okmulgee Park is a city park in Okmulgee, Oklahoma in the United States. The park contains 1,075 acres (435 ha) and sits at an elevation of 758 feet (231 m). The park is adjacent to Dripping Springs Park and is located on Okmulgee Lake. Okmulgee Park, a municipal park established in 1963, is open for year-round recreation including camping, fishing, swimming and hiking.

== History ==
Okmulgee Park is on land that was at the bottom of a vast inland sea 200 to 350 million years ago. The rocks at the park date back to the Pennsylvanian Period. Okmulgee and neighboring Dripping Springs Park are two of the very few places in the world where the rare fossil, Gymnophyllum wardi also known as "button coral", can be found.

The facilities of Okmulgee and Dripping Springs Parks were constructed by the Works Progress Administration and Civilian Conservation Corps. The WPA and CCC were work relief programs for men from unemployed families, established during the Great Depression. As part of President Franklin D. Roosevelt's New Deal legislation, they were designed to combat unemployment during the Great Depression. The WPA and CCC operated in every U.S. state. The men of the WPA and CCC replaced an earthen dam at Okmulgee Lake which was built in 1927. They also built a spillway and many of the park facilities that are still in use today.

Both Dripping Springs and Okmulgee Parks became Oklahoma state parks when management of the park was transferred from the city of Okmulgee to the state. The latter became Oklahoma State Park in 1963. Dripping Springs was leased to the state by the city in 1988. In 2015, the parks were removed from the state park system and are again managed by the City of Okmulgee.

== Recreation ==
Okmulgee Park is open for year-round recreation. Okmulgee Lake has a surface area of 668 acres (270 ha), is open to fishing, boating and swimming. Built in 1927 to provide water for the city of Okmulgee, it is considered to be an "old fishing lake." The lake bottom features large boulders and thick oak tree trunks. Common game fish found in the lake are crappie, white bass, sunfish, largemouth bass, and channel catfish. Okmulgee Lake has been designated as an Oklahoma "Trophy Bass Lake." In addition to fishing the lake is open to boating, kayaking, swimming, and water-skiing. There are 75 RV camping sites and 50 tent camping sites at the park. The boat ramps are lit. Okmulgee Park also features a 3-mile (4.8 km) hiking trail and extensive picnic facilities. Hunting is not permitted within the park, but a public hunting area is located on the north and west side of the lake.

== Lake Okmulgee Dam Spillway Cascade ==
The end of Okmulgee Lake features the Lake Okmulgee Dam Spillway Cascade, listed in the National Register of Historic Places in Okmulgee County, Oklahoma, which on occasions of heavy rains and high lake levels creates an intense man-made waterfall.
