= Okmulgee, Oklahoma =

Okmulgee, Oklahoma Okmulke (Creek)
- City
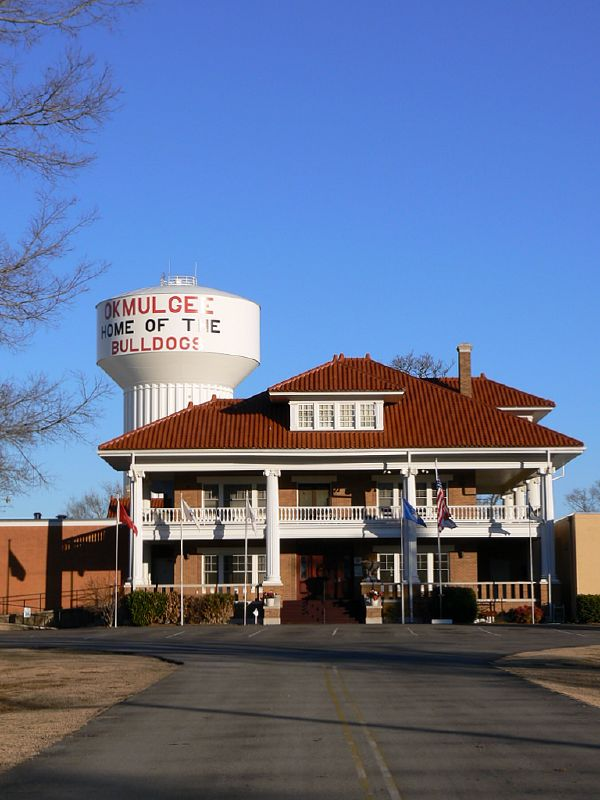
- Elks Lodge and Water Tower in Okmulgee, originally the Wilson Mansion

- Location of Okmulgee in Oklahoma Location of Okmulgee in the US
- Coordinates: 35°37′28″N 95°57′48″W
- Country: United States
- State: Oklahoma
- County: Okmulgee

Government
  - Type: Council-Manager

Area
  - Total: 19.98 sq mi (51.76 km^{2})
  - Land: 17.22 sq mi (44.59 km^{2})
  - Water: 2.77 sq mi (7.17 km^{2})
- Elevation: 650 ft (200 m)

Population (2020)
  - Total: 11,322
  - Density: 658/sq mi (253.9/km^{2})
  - CSA: 1,126,243 (US: 53rd)
- Time zone: UTC-6 (Central (CST))
  - Summer (DST): UTC-5 (CDT)
- ZIP code: 74447
- Area codes: 539/918
- FIPS code: 40-55150
- GNIS feature ID: 2411312
- Website: okmulgeeonline.com

Okmulgee (Note: /oʊkˈmʌlɡiː/ ohk-MULL-ghee; Creek: Okmulke) is a city in the Tulsa metropolitan area and the county seat of Okmulgee County in Oklahoma, United States. As of the 2020 census, Okmulgee had a population of 11,322. The name is from the Muskogee word okimulgi, which means "boiling waters". The site was chosen because of the nearby rivers and springs. Okmulgee is 38 miles south of Tulsa and 13 miles north of Henryetta via US-75.

== History ==
Okmulgee has been the capital of the Muscogee (Creek) Nation since 1868, when it was founded following the Civil War. The Creek Nation began restoring order after that conflict. They had allied with the Confederacy during the war and needed to make a new peace treaty with the United States afterward as a result. They passed a new constitution and elected Samuel Checote as their first principal chief after the war.

In 1869, a post office (originally spelled Okmulkee) was established in the town, with Captain Frederick B. Severs appointed as the first postmaster. The name of the post office was officially changed to the present spelling on November 15, 1883. For seven years, beginning December 20, 1870, Okmulgee was the seat of government of all of what would become the State of Oklahoma, except for the Panhandle.

Okmulgee became a transportation center. The St. Louis, Oklahoma and Southern Railway (later absorbed by the St. Louis – San Francisco Railway or "Frisco") reached Okmulgee in 1900; this route still remains and is now operated by the BNSF Railway. The Shawnee, Oklahoma and Missouri Coal and Railway (also later acquired by the Frisco) was built from Muskogee to Okmulgee in 1902-03, and lasted until abandoned in 1973. And, the shortline Coalton Railway, later called the Okmulgee Northern Railway, operated between Okmulgee and Deep Fork carrying coal from the producing areas around Schulter, Coalton and Dewar from 1916 to 1964. Railroad projects which tried unsuccessfully to reach Okmulgee include the Oklahoma-Southwestern Railway, which planned to build from Bristow to Okmulgee but only made it to Nuyaka; the Kansas, Okmulgee and Gulf Railroad, which planned a line from Kansas City through Okmulgee to a point on the Red River, but never got off the ground; and, the Kansas, Oklahoma Central and Southwestern Railway which had Congressional authorization to build a branch from Bartlesville through Okmulgee to Sherman, Texas, but was bought out by the Atchison, Topeka and Santa Fe Railway before construction began.

The arrival of the railways triggered a building boom. By the time of Oklahoma statehood in 1907, the town had 2,322 residents and was named as the seat of Okmulgee County.

Coal mined in the Henryetta area and agriculture were the basis of the early economy. Discovery of oil at nearby Morris in 1907 stimulated expansion of Okmulgee, and attracted several new industries to town. These included three glass factories, a bottle factory, and foundry and machine shops. Five local refineries were operational by the early 1920s. (Note: The five refineries in Okmulgee, their build dates, and their initial processing capacities were: American Refining Co., 1907, 4,000 barrels per day (“bpd”); Indiahoma Refining Co., 1910, 3,750 bpd; Lake Park Refining Co., 1915, 2,000 bpd; Okmulgee Producing & Refining Co., 1916, 2,500 bpd; and, Allied Refining Co., 1917, 1,000 bpd. The American Refining facility was acquired by Empire Refining in 1916, and the Lake Park Refining facility was merged into Meridian Petroleum Company in 1920. The Okmulgee Producing facility lasted the longest. It was acquired in 1920 by Phillips Higrade Refining Company, a subsidiary of Waite Phillips Company, and was a Phillips Petroleum Company operation from 1930 to 1966. It was sold in 1966 to Okmulgee Refining Co., later called OKC Refining, Inc., a subsidiary of Oklahoma Cement Co., later called OKC Corp. In 1981 the refinery was sold to Basin Refining Inc., and was finally closed permanently in 1982 in conjunction with Basin’s bankruptcy. Cleanup of the area was led by Phillips Petroleum under state supervision starting in 1996, and the tract was reopened under Okmulgee Area Development Corporation ownership in 2012 as the Okmulgee Business Complex. The Empire Refining site, later a peanut processing plant, was cleaned up through a voluntary effort among the City of Okmulgee, the Oklahoma Department of Environment Quality, and OXY USA Inc., completed in September of 2023.)

These industries were a catalyst for growth: The population was 4,176 in the 1910 census, but the city boomed to approximately 35,000 people during the 1920s. A newspaper article from this era claimed Okmulgee had more millionaires per capita than anyplace else in Oklahoma. The Okmulgee Chamber of Commerce has said the town had more millionaires per capita than any other place in the entire country.

But decreasing oil production and lower prices, the coming of the Great Depression, and other factors caused the population to shrink to 17,097 by the 1930 census. The population then remained relatively stable for a time, increasing slightly to 18,317 by the 1950 census. In the postwar period, there was an urbanization shift of population toward larger cities and their suburbs because of job opportunities, and the city's population declined again. The population at the 2020 census was 11,332, a loss of about 8% percent from the 2010 census figure of 12,321.

== Geography ==
Okmulgee is located at 35°37′28″N 95°57′48″W (35.624558, -95.963254). According to the United States Census Bureau, the city has a total area of 33.8 square miles (33.2 km^{2}), all of its land. It is located in the heart of Oklahoma's "Green Country", in the North East Quadrant of Oklahoma. Okmulgee is 38 miles south of Tulsa and 13 miles north of Henryetta via US-75.

== Demographics ==
Historical population
Census	Pop.	Note	%±
1910	4,176		—
1920	17,430		317.4%
1930	17,097		−1.9%
1940	16,051		−6.1%
1950	18,317		14.1%
1960	15,951		−12.9%
1970	15,180		−4.8%
1980	16,263		7.1%
1990	13,441		−17.4%
2000	13,022		−3.1%
2010	12,321		−5.4%
2020	11,322		−8.1%

=== 2020 census ===
As of the 2020 census, Okmulgee had a population of 11,322, 4,380 households, and a median age of 38.6 years. The population density was 657.6 people per square mile.

20.7% of residents were under the age of 18 and 19.2% were 65 years of age or older. For every 100 females there were 99.5 males, and for every 100 females age 18 and over there were 95.6 males age 18 and over.

94.1% of residents lived in urban areas, while 5.9% lived in rural areas.

There were 4,380 households, of which 27.1% had children under the age of 18 living in them. Of all households, 32.8% were married-couple households, 20.9% were households with a male householder and no spouse or partner present, and 38.9% were households with a female householder and no spouse or partner present. About 36.2% of all households were made up of individuals and 17.3% had someone living alone who was 65 years of age or older.

There were 5,266 housing units, of which 16.8% were vacant. Among occupied housing units, 54.1% were owner-occupied and 45.9% were renter-occupied. The homeowner vacancy rate was 3.6% and the rental vacancy rate was 14.5%.

Racial composition as of the 2020 census
Race	Percent
White	47.8%
Black or African American	16.2%
American Indian and Alaska Native	18.4%
Asian	0.7%
Native Hawaiian and Other Pacific Islander	<0.1%
Some other race	2.5%
Two or more races	14.2%
Hispanic or Latino (of any race)	5.3%

The median household income, for the period 2016-2020 and in 2020 dollars, was $31,572. The per capita income for the city in the last 12 months, also for the period 2016–2020 and in 2020 dollars, was $19,564. About 24.3% are considered persons in poverty.

== Economy ==
Along with coal mining, agriculture supported the early economy. Cotton, corn, feed grains, and forage were the main crops. Truck farming, dairying, and poultry raising were also important.

Discovery of the Morris and Lucky oil pools in 1907 brought prosperity to Okmulgee. It also attracted new manufacturing facilities to the city.

In the 21st century, the most important business sectors in Okmulgee are: construction, retail trade, health care & social assistance, and accommodation & food services. The Okmulgee area's major employers include the Muscogee (Creek) Nation, Anchor Glass (plant is in Henryetta), Paccar Winch-Okmulgee, Tate & Lyle, PLC (plant produces gellan and xanthan gum for food and pharmaceutical applications),, Honeywell's Callidus Technologies (facility is in Beggs), East Central Electric Cooperative, Covington Aircraft, G&H Decoy (in Henryetta), and PolyVision. Dlubak Glass Oklahoma runs a glass recycling facility, while wood pallet producer Mid-America Pallet is operated by The Hodges Companies. Walmart operates a Supercenter in town.

== Government ==
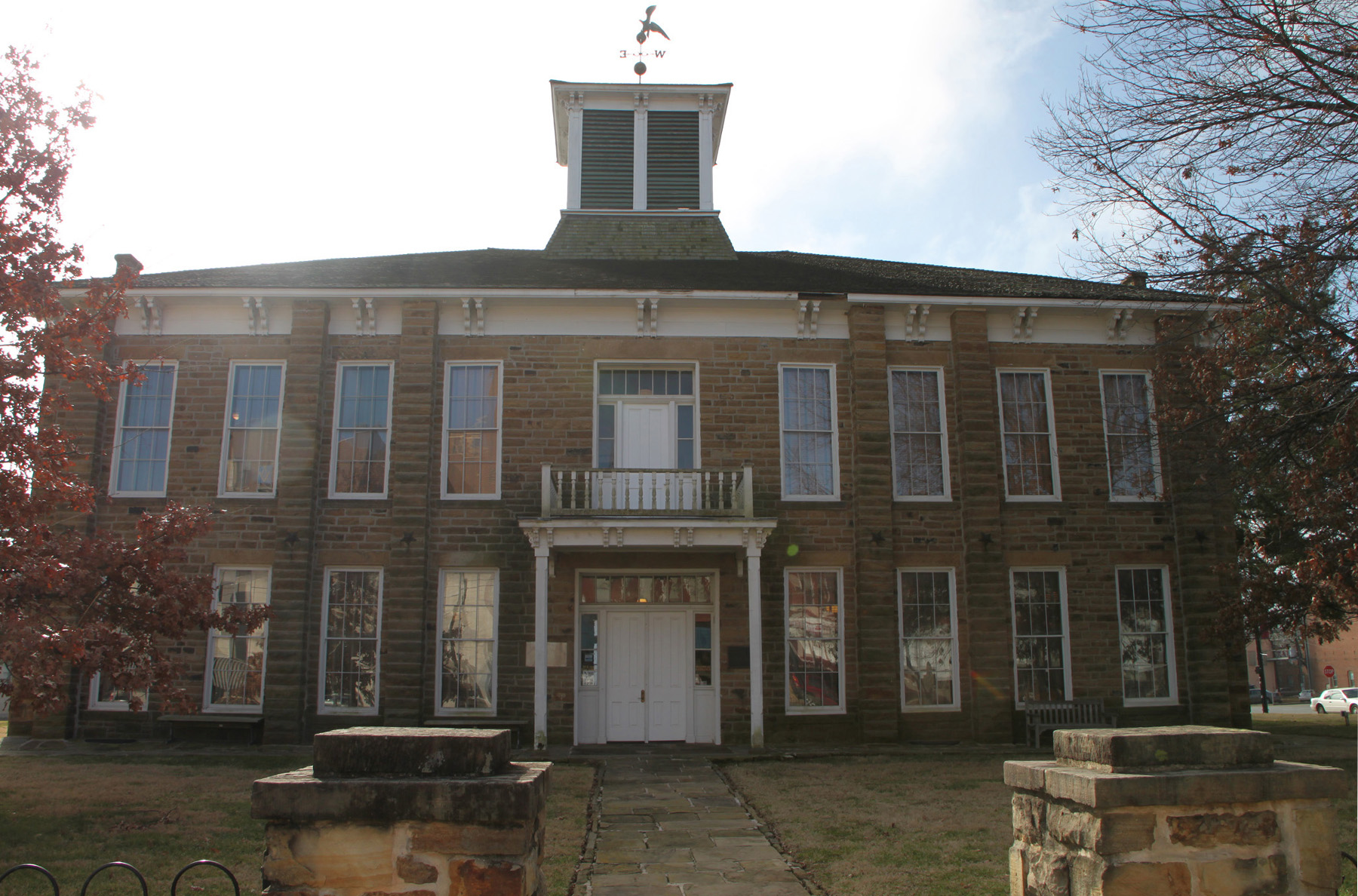
Muscogee (Creek) Nation Council House. Former capitol of the Muscogee (Creek) Nation. March 9, 2017.

=== City government ===
The City of Okmulgee government has a City Council composed of five members: a council member "at-large" who serves as the Mayor, and one council member from each of the City's four wards. A City Manager is in charge of directing the day-to-day operations of the City in order to carry out the policies established by the City Council. City Hall is at 111 E 4th Street downtown.

=== County government ===
Okmulgee County government has three commissioners, one for each of the three Districts. County services, including the District Court, Assessor, County Clerk, Jail, and Sheriff's office, are all located between 6th and 8th St, and Alabama and Seminole Avenues.

=== Native American government ===
While the historical capitol of the Muscogee (Creek) Nation is the Creek Council House in downtown Okmulgee, the MCN's modern headquarters is at Okmulgee Creek Nation Tribal Complex at U.S. Route 75 and Loop 56. Other MCN facilities in town include the College of the Muscogee Nation, a tribal college primarily for students seeking careers in the tribal sector, located at 2170 Raven Circle; One Fire Casino at 1901 Wood Dr; and, the Claude A. Cox Omniplex, cattycornered across from the Tribal Complex off U.S. 75 and Loop 56, which includes the Muscogee Dome multipurpose recreation center and other festival grounds and facilities.

== Education ==
=== Okmulgee Public Schools ===
Okmulgee Public Schools include the Primary School, Dunbar, and High School.

=== CareerTech ===
- Green Country Technology Center, part of the Oklahoma Department of Career and Technology Education system.

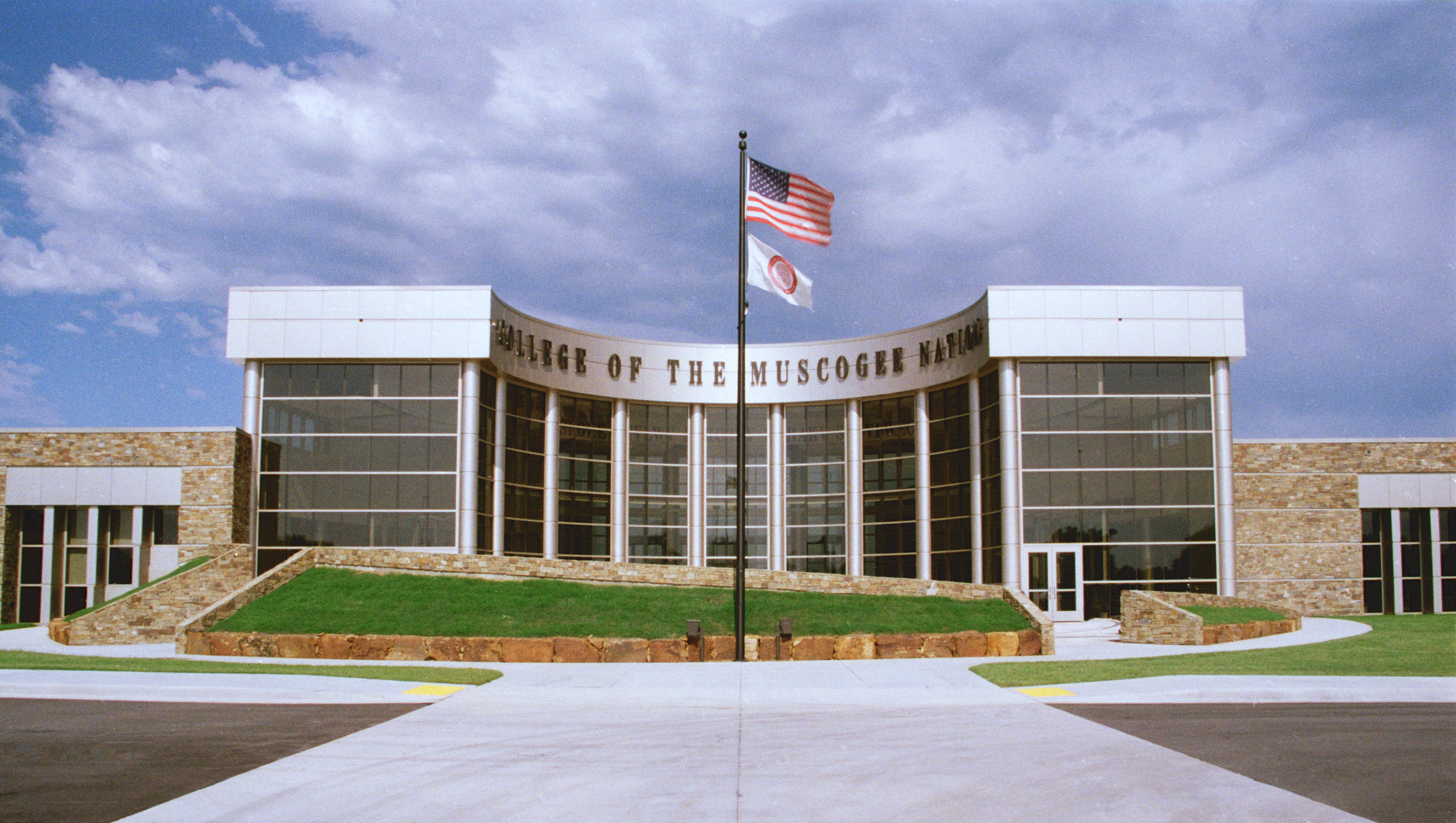
College of the Muscogee Nation

=== Post secondary ===
- College of the Muscogee Nation
- Oklahoma State University Institute of Technology ("OSUIT"), also known as Oklahoma State University-Okmulgee, or informally, as Okmulgee Tech. The school site in 1943 was Glennan Military Hospital, constructed on land formerly belonging to the Creek Orphan Home. The hospital originally treated WWII American servicemen, but later served wounded POWs. In 1946 the site was sold to Oklahoma State Technical College to provide technical training for returning GIs. This evolved into the current OSUIT.

== Parks and recreation ==
Recreational opportunities include Okmulgee Park and Dripping Springs Park, which offer RV and camping facilities. The parks also offer swimming, fishing, and boating opportunities through the adjacent Dripping Springs Lake, which has 18 miles (29 km) of shoreline and 1,150 acres (4,700,000 m^{2}) of water, and the separate Okmulgee Lake. The end of Okmulgee Lake features the Lake Okmulgee Dam Spillway Cascade, listed in the National Register of Historic Places in Okmulgee County, Oklahoma, which on occasions of heavy rains and high lake levels creates an intense man-made waterfall. Near Okmulgee is the Deep Fork National Wildlife Refuge. Established in 1993, this approximately 9,000 acres (36 km^{2}) of habitat for waterfowl along the Deep Fork River features opportunities for wildlife viewing such as along the Cussetah Bottoms Boardwalk, as well as fishing and certain archery, muzzle-loading, and small-game hunting opportunities.

Lake Eufaula, Oklahoma’s largest lake, is to the southeast.

Okmulgee Municipal Park, at W 20th St. & S Seminole Ave., features a bike trail, walking track, playground, and soccer field. Other municipal park facilities include Hawthorne Park (having a skate park, baseball park, and tennis court, among other facilities) at N Okmulgee Ave & W Fairfax St, Kiddy Lake Park at Cliff Dr & Parkview Dr, Noble Park at 13th & Delaware, Red Francis Park at S Woodlawn Ave & E 7th St, and Southeast Rotary Park at W 15th St & S Okmulgee Ave.

The Okmulgee County Fairgrounds hosts the annual Okmulgee County Fair and other events through the year.

== Historic buildings ==
In November 1992, the Okmulgee Downtown Historic District (NRIS number 92001693) was added to the National Register of Historic Places (NRHP) in Okmulgee County. The area is roughly bounded by Fourth Street, Eighth Street, Okmulgee Avenue and the Frisco tracks. In support of Okmulgee's downtown, an organization has been formed called Okmulgee Main Street, one of the various national Main Street programs that aim to reenergize their respective downtowns and commercial districts through preservation-based economic development and community revitalization. This group is helping to propel the “Okmulgee Rising” movement that started in the city in 2014. The process is aided in part by tax incentives for preserving historic properties. Among the downtown structures is the Orpheum Theater at 210 W 7th St, which opened as the Cook Opera House on August 23, 1920 with 1,200-seat capacity. This is the finest and last surviving of three grand theatres formerly located in Okmulgee. The Orpheum's architecture, which is an elegant derivation of Spanish Baroque Revival, includes a colorful lobby which is the finest example in Oklahoma of the interior use of polychrome terra cotta.

The historic Okmulgee County Courthouse, at 314 W. 7th, was built in 1916 and is also NRHP-listed.

The Creeks initially built a two-story log council house to serve as their capital. This building burned in 1878 and was replaced with the stone Creek Council House building that stands today. Ownership of the building changed over the years, but in November 2010 the City sold the building back to the tribe for $3.2 million. The building currently houses the Creek Council House Museum, with artifacts and exhibits about the history of the Muscogee tribe and the arts and crafts of other Native American tribes. The building is NRHP-listed.

The Okmulgee Public Library, 218 S. Okmulgee Avenue, completed in 1921, is a good example of Georgian Revival architecture, and is NRHP-listed.

In 2012 the Muscogee (Creek) Nation purchased the Okmulgee Golf Club, also known as the Okmulgee Country Club, at 1400 S. Mission Street, an NRHP-listed location complete with the original 1920 golf course and the 1925 clubhouse built using locally sourced limestone. The MCN intends to turn that facility into a cultural center where events can be held.

Historic churches include First Baptist Central Church, an historically black church built in 1915 and NRHP-listed; Eastside Baptist Church, built in 1921 and NRHP-listed; and, St. Anthony's, a Spanish Colonial Revival-style Catholic church built in 1927 and NRHP-listed.

Historic mansions remaining from the boom days include the Okmulgee Elks Lodge at 701 S. Mission, being a 7-acre site that was originally the Wilson Mansion from 1922; the Southern Mansion just off US-75 on Banyan Road, being the 1928 home for Creek orphan Katie Fixico; the Kennedy Mansion from 1904 at 502 S. Okmulgee Avenue, which is NRHP-listed; and, the "Historic Okmulgee Mansion" at 1700 E. 6th Street, originally the stately 1921 Italian Renaissance home built for oil producer Eugene R. Black, now law offices.

The Nuyaka Mission site is located on McKeown Rd. (aka E0945 Rd) just off N 120 Rd (aka N3850 Rd) approximately 15.7 miles west of the intersection of U.S. Route 75 and State Highway 56 (aka 6th Street) in Okmulgee, and is NRHP-listed.

== Events ==
Okmulgee is known for its annual Okmulgee Invitational Rodeo and Festival, which is the nation's oldest African-American rodeo and one of the state's longest running rodeos.

The Okmulgee Farmer's Market has been running every year since 2013, and is open once a week (sometimes twice weekly) from May to October.

Okmulgee has an annual Pecan Festival. At the festival in 1989, a record was set for what was then the largest pecan pie in the world, being 40’ in diameter and using over sixteen-and-a-half tons of ingredients. A mural in town commemorates the event.

The Okmulgee County Fair is held annually (typically in September) at the Okmulgee County Fairgrounds, and includes commercial booths, exhibits, livestock shows, livestock judging, a horse show and cattle displays.

Other family-oriented festivals and special events occur on a monthly schedule throughout the year, including the OrangeFest, Harvest Spoon Chili Fest, Muscogee Creek Nation Festival, Eats and Beats, and the bi-annual Airfest.

== Transportation ==
Okmulgee is served by U.S. Route 75, a major national north/south artery for much of its length, currently running from the Canada-US border at Noyes, Minn. to Dallas, Texas, as well as by U.S. Route 62, which runs from the Mexico-US border at El Paso, Texas to Niagara Falls, New York near the Canada-US border.

Okmulgee is in the 10-county region served by the KI BOIS Area Transit System ("KATS"), a low-cost public bus/van service established in 1983 to help communities, primarily in southeast Oklahoma, by providing access to Senior Citizen centers, groceries, medical services, and jobs. This includes transportation to certain out-of-town destinations such as Henryetta, Beggs, Preston, Morris, and Schulter. The Muscogee (Creek) Nation partners with KATS on certain on-demand transportation services; and, Muscogee (Creek) Nation Transit provides regularly scheduled trolley-style bus services to various locations around the city. These services are not limited to tribal citizens.

The city has the Okmulgee Regional Airport (originally called the Okmulgee Municipal Airport), designated OKM by IATA Code and KOKM by ICAO Code. Construction of this airport was authorized in 1942 as a national defense project, and was completed on September 7, 1943. The main runway (18-36) is concrete-surfaced, 100' wide and 5,150' long. Effective July 1, 2015, the airport is managed by the Tulsa Airports Improvement Trust.

Commercial air transportation is available at Tulsa International Airport, about 47 miles to the north.

Rail freight service is provided by BNSF Railway.

== Media ==
The Okmulgee Times is the local daily paper, also available online in an E-Edition.

OHS Broadcast Media is an Official Okmulgee Public Schools site for all things Bulldog.

KOKL, a/k/a The Brew, is a broadcast radio station in Okmulgee on FM 106.3 and AM 1240, playing classic hits of the 60’s, 70’s and 80’s.

== Notable people ==
- Donald W. Burgess, meteorologist, tornado and weather radar expert
- Joyce Cobb, jazz and R&B singer
- Samuel Checote, (1819–1884), Creek chief
- John Karl Baldischwiler, (NFL Player) Detroit Lions (1978–1982) Baltimore/Indianapolis Colts (1983–1986)
- Angela Barker-Jones, Cherokee jurist
- Patrick Collins, NFL player
- Ron Gardenhire, manager of MLB's Detroit Tigers
- Jim House, Arkansas state legislator
- Dan Kenan, football player and head coach at Wesleyan University, lived in Okmulgee and served as its mayor for two terms
- Wright King, actor, birthplace
- Dewey McClain, NFL player, labor leader, politician
- Mel McDaniel, country musician
- Edward H. Moore (1871–1950), United States Senator from Oklahoma (1943 - 1949), wealthy businessman
- Melvin Morris, United States Army Medal of Honor Recipient
- Gary P. Nunn, country music singer and songwriter
- David Obey, US Congressman, birthplace
- Oscar Pettiford, jazz bass player
- Will Sampson, artist and actor
- Bill Self, Hall of Fame college basketball coach at Kansas
- Leon B. Senter, architect, established his first office in Okmulgee in 1920 and designed the Okmulgee Golf Course and Country Club, then moved to Tulsa where he headquartered for the rest of his life
- Ted Taylor, singer
- David Thompson, Former NFL running back for St.Louis Rams (1997 - 1999), Oklahoma State University 3rd All-Time Leading Rusher 4,493 rushing yards(1993). 2 X State Champion 200 meters 21.2 seconds 1992 & 1992.

== In popular culture ==
The pilot for the FX comedy series Reservation Dogs from filmmaker Sterlin Harjo, which concerns four Native American teens in rural Oklahoma, was shot in Okmulgee. Additional principal photography for the rest of Season 1 also occurred in Okmulgee, as well as Tulsa, Sand Springs, Beggs, Inola, and Terlton. Seasons 2 and 3 were primarily filmed on location in Okmulgee as well.

The film Sarah's Oil, regarding the fight of Oklahoman Sarah Rector, child of a Creek Freedman, to hold on to her fabulous oil wealth in the early 1900’s, was shot primarily in Okmulgee in mid-2024.

In the Elmore Leonard novella “Comfort to the Enemy,” the parties stay in Okmulgee while visiting the POW camp.
