= Deep Fork National Wildlife Refuge =

Protected area in Oklahoma, United States

- IUCN category IV (habitat/species management area)
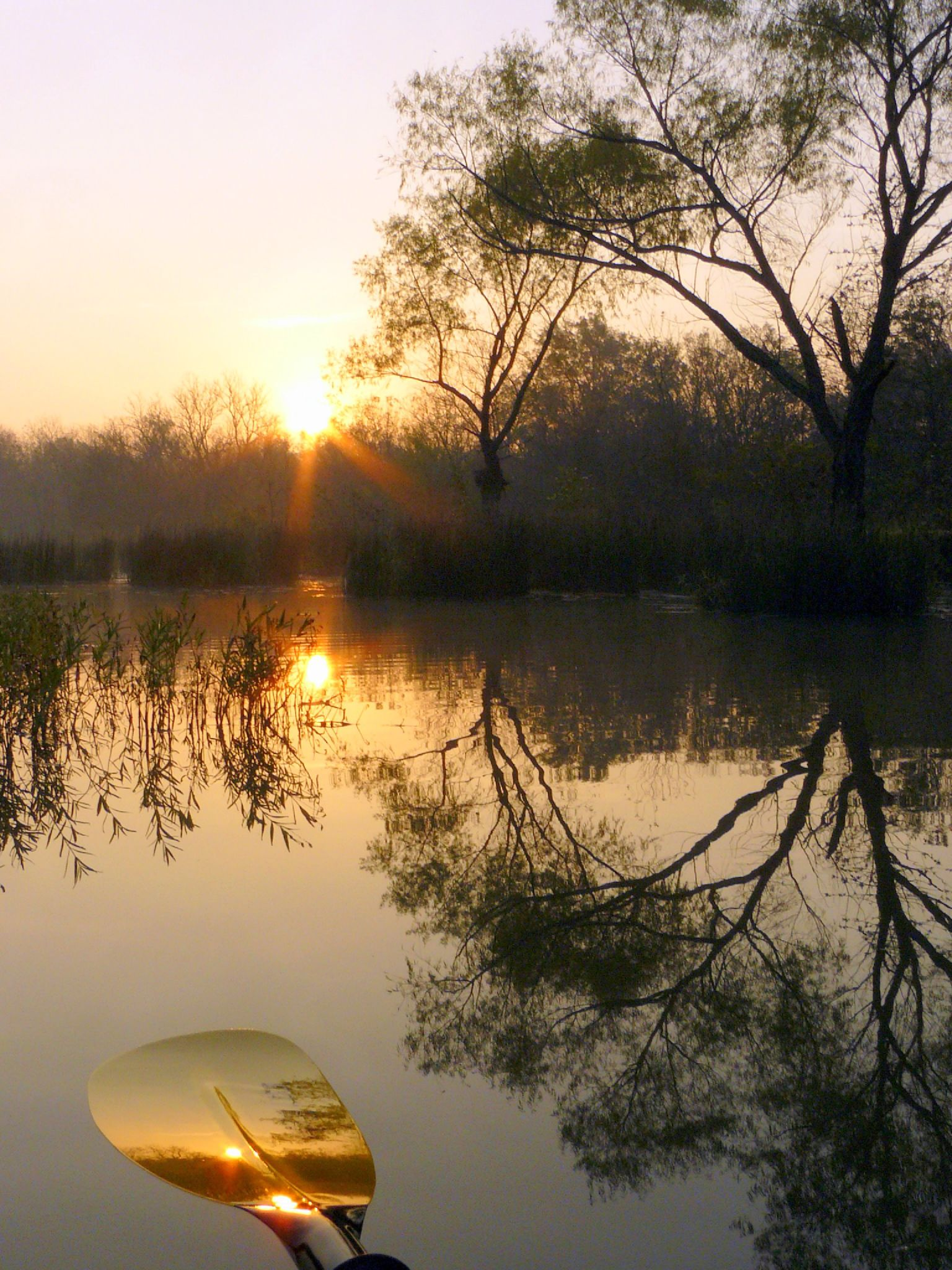
- Kayaking in the Deep Fork Wildlife Refuge at sunrise

- Location within the United States
- Location: Okmulgee County, Oklahoma, United States
- Nearest city: Okmulgee, Oklahoma
- Coordinates: 35°35′N 95°58′W
- Area: 9,748.28 acres (39.4499 km^{2})
- Established: 1993
- Visitors: 45,000 per year
- Governing body: U.S. Fish and Wildlife Service
- Website: Deep Fork National Wildlife Refuge

The Deep Fork National Wildlife Refuge (DFNWR) is part of the United States system of National Wildlife Refuges, and is a critical resource for wildfowl that migrate along the Central Flyway in Spring and Fall. It is located in Eastern Oklahoma, near the city of Okmulgee. The preserve runs along both banks of the Deep Fork River for about 20 miles (32 km). According to TravelOK, DFNWR receives about 45,000 visitors every year.

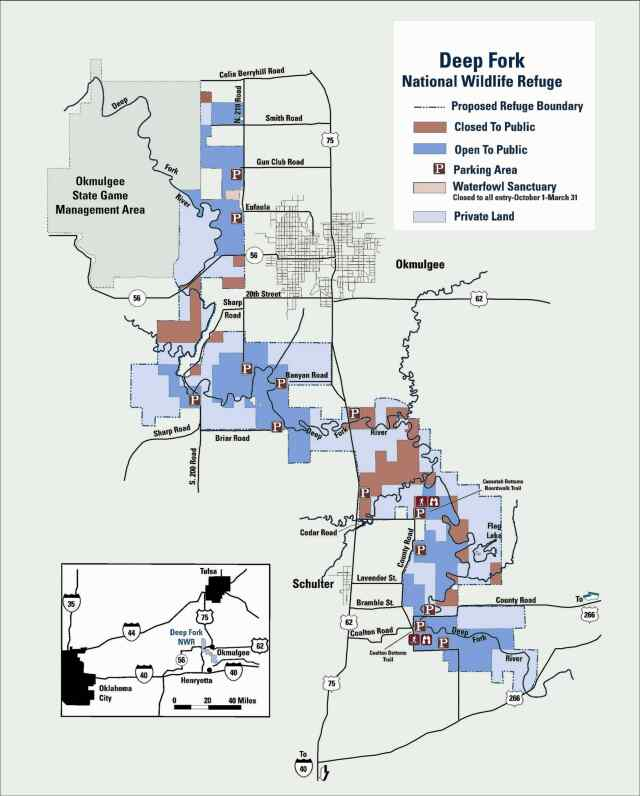
A map of the Deep Fork National Wildlife Refuge.

== Description ==
The refuge was established in June 1993 and dedicated in February 1995. The land within its legal boundaries is 18,359 acres (74.30 km^{2}) of which about 9,748 acres (39.45 km^{2}) were publicly owned in 2015. Additional land will be purchased from willing sellers as funds are available, and until the refuge reaches its legal limit in size.

The refugee is a narrow ribbon of wetlands, oxbow lakes, swamps, and upland forests along the meandering Deep Fork River. More than 80 percent of the refuge floods annually, thus providing excellent habitat for waterfowl and a wide variety of other animals, including white-tailed deer, bald eagles, and wild turkey. 254 species of birds and 51 species of mammals have been recorded in the refuge. Four wildlife species of special concern abound here (the river otter, Bell’s vireo, alligator snapping turtle, and the northern scarlet snake). Beavers are so numerous as to be considered pests, as are feral hogs.

Most of the vegetation in the refuge is bottomland forests of oak, pecan, elm, hickory, ash, sugarberry, walnut, river birch, and willow. The area has been logged in the past and most of the forest is still relatively young, although a few patches of mature forests can be found. New hardwood growth sprouts near the river, then spreads more widely in the refuge when the floods come.

== Recreation ==
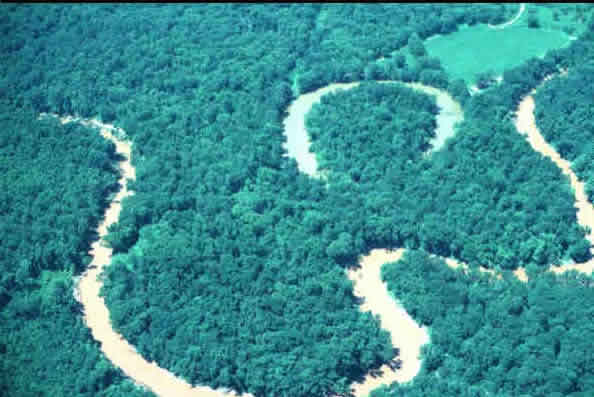
An aerial view of the Deep Fork River in the National Wildlife Refuge.

Most of the refuge is open to the public year-round. Several parking areas scattered around the refuge give access to visitors for bird watching, hunting, fishing, hiking, and boating. A fishing area is maintained on Montezuma Creek. Near the headquarters the Cussetah Bottoms Boardwalk leads through forests, swamps, and beaver ponds for about one-half mile. In the southernmost part of the refuge a trail through forests follows an old railroad grade, thus elevating it above the frequently-flooded land. Deer, rabbits, squirrel, turkey, and ducks can also be hunted. The Deep Fork River is noted for large Flathead catfish and also has other species. Kayaking is popular in the refuge. The refuge has 22 parking lots connected to the hunting and wildlife observation areas by 25 miles (40 km) of trails and unimproved roads. Off-road vehicles are prohibited.

The Deep Fork National Wildlife Refuge is bordered on the north by the Okmulgee Wildlife Management area (OWMA) of 10,900 acres (44 km^{2}). Deep Fork River runs for 6 miles (9.7 km) through the OWMA, which is mostly upland and hilly rather than flat and swampy, as the refuge is. Adjoining the refuge on the south is the Eufaula Wildlife Management area which preserves another 7 miles (11 km) of the Deep Fork River to its mouth at Eufaula Lake. Land in Eufaula WMA is similar in character to the refuge. The three areas together preserve in a near natural state more than 25,000 acres (100 km^{2}) and 30 miles (48 km) of the Deep Fork River.
