= Schulter, Oklahoma =

- Town
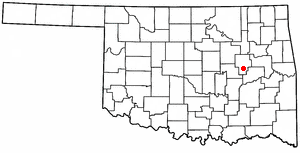
- Location of Schulter, Oklahoma
- Coordinates: 35°30′40″N 95°57′23″W
- Country: United States
- State: Oklahoma
- County: Okmulgee

Area
  - Total: 0.85 sq mi (2.20 km^{2})
  - Land: 0.85 sq mi (2.20 km^{2})
  - Water: 0 sq mi (0.00 km^{2})
- Elevation: 699 ft (213 m)

Population (2020)
  - Total: 422
  - Density: 497.3/sq mi (192.01/km^{2})
- Time zone: UTC-6 (Central (CST))
  - Summer (DST): UTC-5 (CDT)
- ZIP code: 74460
- Area codes: 539/918
- FIPS code: 40-65900
- GNIS feature ID: 2413265

Schulter is a town in Okmulgee County, Oklahoma, United States. The population was 422 at the time of the 2020 census.

== History ==
Located approximately eight miles south of Okmulgee and six miles north of Henryetta in Okmulgee County, just off U.S. routes 75 and 62, the original name of the town may have been Winchell. The town was added along the route of the St. Louis, Oklahoma and Southern Railway (later the St. Louis–San Francisco Railway, or Frisco) built between Okmulgee and Henryetta in 1900. The post office built in August 1903 was named for Matt Schulter, said to be a resident of St. Louis, Missouri. Coal mining in the Henryetta Coal Formation was an important early industry in the area, and attracted many nationalities of European immigrants. Early Schulter, circa 1909, had three coal company offices, phone service, a school, a general store, and even a pool hall for its 200 residents. Later, the town benefitted from oil exploration, production, and refining. The town's peak population may have been circa 1930, at 650 people. The town did not officially incorporate until May 5, 1998.

== Geography ==
Okmulgee is north of town, while Henryetta is south. U.S. routes 75 and 62 run concurrently north and south through Schulter. Lake Eufaula is east-southeast of town.

According to the United States Census Bureau, the town has a total area of 0.9 square miles (2.3 km^{2}), all land.

== Demographics ==
Historical population
Census	Pop.	Note	%±
2000	600		—
2010	509		−15.2%
2020	422		−17.1%
U.S. Decennial Census

=== 2020 census ===
As of the 2020 census, Schulter had a population of 422. The median age was 45.8 years. 20.4% of residents were under the age of 18 and 24.6% of residents were 65 years of age or older. For every 100 females there were 96.3 males, and for every 100 females age 18 and over there were 88.8 males age 18 and over.

0.0% of residents lived in urban areas, while 100.0% lived in rural areas.

There were 170 households in Schulter, of which 28.2% had children under the age of 18 living in them. Of all households, 45.3% were married-couple households, 18.8% were households with a male householder and no spouse or partner present, and 31.8% were households with a female householder and no spouse or partner present. About 31.8% of all households were made up of individuals and 17.7% had someone living alone who was 65 years of age or older.

There were 215 housing units, of which 20.9% were vacant. The homeowner vacancy rate was 4.2% and the rental vacancy rate was 13.6%.

Racial composition as of the 2020 census
Race	Number	Percent
White	312	73.9%
Black or African American	1	0.2%
American Indian and Alaska Native	64	15.2%
Asian	0	0.0%
Native Hawaiian and Other Pacific Islander	0	0.0%
Some other race	4	0.9%
Two or more races	41	9.7%
Hispanic or Latino (of any race)	14	3.3%

=== 2000 census ===
As of the census of 2000, there were 600 people, 234 households, and 169 families residing in the town. The population density was 681.3 inhabitants per square mile (263.1/km^{2}). There were 253 housing units at an average density of 287.3 per square mile (110.9/km^{2}). The racial makeup of the town was 84.50% White, 8.33% Native American, and 7.17% from two or more races. Hispanic or Latino of any race were 1.67% of the population.

There were 234 households, out of which 35.0% had children under the age of 18 living with them, 57.3% were married couples living together, 12.0% had a female householder with no husband present, and 27.4% were non-families. 24.8% of all households were made up of individuals, and 12.8% had someone living alone who was 65 years of age or older. The average household size was 2.56 and the average family size was 3.04.

In the town, the population was spread out, with 26.8% under the age of 18, 8.5% from 18 to 24, 24.2% from 25 to 44, 27.7% from 45 to 64, and 12.8% who were 65 years of age or older. The median age was 39 years. For every 100 females, there were 89.9 males. For every 100 females age 18 and over, there were 91.7 males.

The median income for a household in the town was $26,818, and the median income for a family was $35,500. Males had a median income of $31,667 versus $20,417 for females. The per capita income for the town was $12,539. About 8.6% of families and 15.9% of the population were below the poverty line, including 13.9% of those under age 18 and 23.2% of those age 65 or over.
