= Dripping Springs Park =

State park in Oklahoma, US

- Location within Oklahoma
- Location: Okmulgee County, Oklahoma, United States
- Nearest city: Okmulgee, OK
- Coordinates: 35.608889°N 96.070278°W
- Area: 1,100 acres (450 ha)
- Established: 1979
- Governing body: City of Okmulgee
- Website: www.travelok.com/listings/view.profile/id.2368

Dripping Springs Park is located in Okmulgee County, Oklahoma, near the city of Okmulgee, Oklahoma. Previously Dripping Springs State Park, the lake and park are now owned by Okmulgee, and are approximately 9 miles (14 km) south of the city.

Recreational opportunities at Dripping Springs Park include RV camping, tent camping, swimming, fishing, and boating. Facilities offered include group pavilions, grills, picnic areas, showers, lighted boat ramp, fishing dock, and an ADA comfort station. RV sites include electric, water, and sewer service. Water skiing is not allowed.

== Dripping Springs Lake ==
Dripping Springs Lake was designated as Oklahoma's first trophy bass lake. The park is adjacent to Okmulgee Park and Okmulgee Lake. This lake has a surface area of 1,100 acres (450 ha) and a relatively flat shoreline of 18 miles (29 km).

The lake has a surface area of 1,150 acres (4,700,000 m^{2}), a mean depth of 14 feet (4.3 m), a normal capacity of 16,200 acre-feet (20,000,000 m^{3}) and a normal pool elevation of 741 feet (226 m) above mean sea level (MSL). Construction began in 1976, but the lake was not completely filled until 1979. The Oklahoma Water Resources Board reported that the lake becomes thermally stratified during summer and does not support the dissolved oxygen (DO) requirements set by the state Fish and Wildlife Propagation Program. However, ODWC also reported that water clarity was excellent, compared to other state lakes, and that it was neutral to slightly alkaline (pH 6.68-7.82).

== See also ==
- Okmulgee Park
