= Henryetta Coal Formation =

Geologic formation in Oklahoma, U.S.

- Stratigraphic range: Carboniferous
- Type: Formation

Location
- Region: Oklahoma
- Country: United States

The Henryetta Coal Formation is a geologic formation in Oklahoma. It contains fossils dating back to the Carboniferous period.

As of a 1955 government report, the mapped area of the Henryetta mining district included about 168 square miles in Okmulgee County. Coal occurred in the Senora formation in two minable beds: the Morris bed and the overlying Henryetta bed. The Morris bed averaged about 16 inches in thickness, while the Henryetta coal bed averaged about 25 to 36 inches in thickness. The coal in both beds was of high volatile A and B bituminous ranks. Remaining coal reserves were estimated to be 275 million tons, 271 million tons of which was in the Henryetta bed.

== See also ==
- List of fossiliferous stratigraphic units in Oklahoma
- Paleontology in Oklahoma
