= Samuel Benton Callahan =

Muscogee politician

Samuel Callahan

Member of the C.S. House of Representatives from the Creek and Seminole's At-large district
- In office February 18, 1864 – May 10, 1865
- Preceded by: Constituency established
- Succeeded by: Constituency abolished

Personal details
- Born: January 26, 1833 Mobile, Alabama, U.S.
- Died: February 17, 1911 (aged 78) Muskogee, Oklahoma, U.S.
- Party: Democratic

Samuel Benton Callahan (January 26, 1833 – February 17, 1911) was an influential, Muscogee politician, born in Mobile, Alabama, to a white father, James Callahan, and Amanda Doyle, a mixed-blood Creek woman. Callahan is listed as 1/8th Creek by Blood on the Dawes Rolls. One source says that James was an Irishman who had previously been an architect or a shipbuilder from Pennsylvania, while Amanda was one-fourth Muscogee. His father died while Callahan was young; Callahan and his mother were required to emigrate to Indian Territory in 1836. His mother married Dr. Owen Davis of Sulphur Springs, Texas, where they raised Samuel.

Callahan married Sarah Elizabeth McAllester, the daughter of a Methodist minister in Sulphur Springs, in 1858. Callahan then moved back to Indian Territory. During the American Civil War, Callahan fought in the First Creek Mounted Volunteers of the Confederate Army. In 1864, Callahan resigned his command to serve in the Second Confederate Congress in Richmond, Virginia, where he would represent the Creek and Seminole nations as a delegate.

Very soon after Callahan left to join the army, a band of marauders invaded his ranch, burning or looting everything valuable they could find. His wife barely escaped discovery and fled to safety in Sulphur Springs along with a slave nurse, a bag of gold, and two small children. Callahan returned to his family in Sulphur Springs, then moved back to Indian Territory after the war. (Note: Sarah was so terrified by the escape that it would take twenty years before Samuel could persuade her to return to Indian Territory. Until then, she and the rest of the family remained in Sulphur Springs.) Settling near Muskogee, Callahan resumed farming and ranching and soon became a significant player in the politics of the Creek Nation. Callahan served in the Creek National Council as clerk of the House of Kings (the Creek equivalent of the Senate) for four years, then as clerk to the Creek Supreme Court. Callahan also acted as executive secretary for three notable principal chiefs, Samuel Checote, Roley McIntosh, and Isparhecher. Callahan worked as editor of the Muskogee Indian Journal, starting in 1887. Callahan was the superintendent of the Wealaka Boarding School. In 1901, Callahan was appointed Justice of the Creek Supreme Court.

Samuel Callahan was born in Mobile, Alabama, as a member of the Creek tribe. Callahan represented the Creek and Seminole nations in the Second Confederate Congress. Removed with his tribe to Indian Territory, Callahan fled with his family to Sulphur Springs, Texas during the Civil War. His daughter Sophia Alice Callahan was born during their time in Texas. Still, at War's end, the family returned to Okmulgee. Callahan served as the editor of the Indian Journal in Muskogee. Callahan was active in tribal affairs, serving as executive secretary to three principal chiefs of the Muscogee (Creek) Nation and became a justice of the Muscogee Nation Supreme Court in 1901.

== Parental family and move to Indian Territory ==
Samuel was born to James Oliver Callahan and Amanda (Doyle) Callahan. Amanda Doyle was born in Georgia (part of the Old Creek Nation) to a white man, Nimrod Doyle, and a Creek mother, Susannah Islands. Little is known of James other than that he died in Alabama before the United States forced Creek Indians to emigrate to Indian Territory. Amanda married James Callahan when she was 16 years old. The Callahans moved to Alabama, where they had two children, but one died in infancy. Amanda and Samuel, the surviving son, were forced to emigrate from Alabama to Indian Territory in 1836. Amanda married Dr. Owen Simpson Davis of Sulphur Springs, Texas, which became Samuel's new home. After her husband died, she moved to Muskogee, where she remained with her son for the rest of her life.

Callahan went to live in Texas when his mother remarried. Callahan attended public schools in Sulphur Springs, then went to McKenzie College in Clarksville, Texas. After graduation, Callahan became editor of the Sulphur Springs Gazette. After two years at the newspaper, Callahan returned to Indian Territory, where he settled in Okmulgee and began a cattle ranch.

== Marriage and family ==
In 1857, S. B. married Sarah Elizabeth Thornberg, daughter of Methodist minister William Thornberg, in Sulphur Springs. They had eight children: Josephine, James Owen, Jane Evylin, Samuel B. Jr., Sophia Alice, Emma Price, Walter McKenzie, and Edwin Thornberg.

== Service to the Confederate States of America ==
During the American Civil War, Callahan served in the First Creek Mounted Volunteers of the Confederate Army. Callahan was popular among the men of his unit, who were mostly full-blood Creeks. Callahan was commissioned as a first lieutenant. Callahan was promoted to adjutant later that year. Callahan assisted in reorganizing his unit in 1863 and emerged as Captain of Company K, First Creek Regiment. On May 18, 1864, Callahan resigned from the Confederate Army to serve in the Second Confederate Congress in Richmond, Virginia, where he would represent both the Creek and Seminole nations as a delegate, beginning May 30, 1864.

When the New York Times published a list of members of the Confederate Congress in 1864, S. B. Callahan was identified as representing both the Creek and Seminole Nations.

== Post Civil War ==
Callahan remained heavily involved in governing the Creek Nation after the Civil War. Callahan was elected to the Creek House of Kings and served from 1868 to 1872. Callahan also served as Private Secretaries for three Creek Principal Chiefs: Roley McIntosh, Samuel Checote and Isparhecher. (Note: The archives of Oklahoma University contain a document generated on the following occasion: On June 11, 1883, Chief Samuel Checote, then Principal Chief of the Muscogee Nation, appointed S.B. Callahan as his Private Secretary.) After his term in the House of Kings, Callahan became a Creek Supreme Court clerk. Callahan worked as editor of the Muskogee Indian Journal, starting in 1887. Callahan was the superintendent of the Wealaka Boarding School from 1892 to 1894. In 1901, Callahan was elected a justice of the Creek Supreme Court.

Callahan died in Muskogee County, Oklahoma, on February 17, 1911, and was buried in Greenhill Cemetery. Just before Callahan died, he was the last living member of the Confederate Congress in Richmond, Virginia. His daughter noted that Callahan was buried wearing his Confederate Army uniform.

According to his obituary, Callahan was survived by the following children: J. O. Callahan and K. W. Callahan of Muskogee; Bent Callahan of Morse, Oklahoma; Mrs. Adair of Little Rock; Mrs. Eva Shaw of Waggoner; and Mrs. H. B. Spaulding of Muskogee.

== Sources ==
- http://hd.housedivided.dickinson.edu/node/5303
- Cox, James Howard; Cox, James H.; Justice, Daniel Heath (2014). The Oxford Handbook of Indigenous American Literature. New York: Oxford University Press. ISBN 978-0-19-991403-6.

Confederate States House of Representatives
New constituency	Delegate to the C.S. House of Representatives from the Creek and Seminole's At-large congressional district 1864–1865	Constituency abolished
