= Nuyaka =

Place in Oklahoma, U.S.

Coordinates: 35.654158°N 96.139862°W

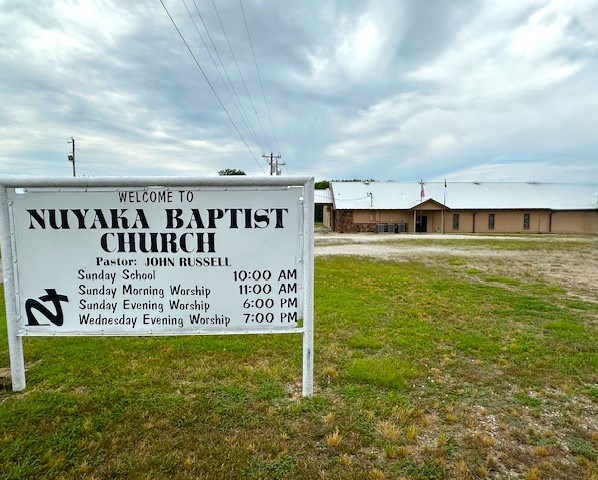
The Baptist Church in Nuyaka, July 2025

Nuyaka (Creek: Nuyakv) is a populated place in Okmulgee County, Oklahoma, United States. It is approximately 7.4 kilometres (4.6 mi) south-southwest of Beggs and is west of the city of Okmulgee off SH-56. The Old Nuyaka Cemetery and the Nuyaka Mission site are southwest of town. The elevation is 735 feet (224 m) and the coordinates are latitude 35.653 and longitude -96.14. It was notable as the center of traditionalist opposition to the Creek national government during the late 19th century.

According to one source, the name Nuyaka is from the Creek pronunciation for New York, which was the site of a meeting between President George Washington and 26 Creek chiefs. The meeting was to discuss a treaty and to obtain a cession of Creek land to the U, S. Government. Reportedly, the Creeks were so impressed with New York City that they named one of their towns in present-day Alabama on the Tallapoosa River for it. The town was abandoned during the Creek War in the fall of 1813 and destroyed by Major General David Adams in December 1813. That site was never rebuilt and is now within the boundary of the Horseshoe Bend National Military Park. White men wrote the town name as Nuyaka.

After the Muscogee (Creek) Nation moved to Indian Territory, the name was given to one of the new Creek towns near Okmulgee. This Nuyaka was populated mainly by full-blood Creeks who did not want to adopt the ways of white civilization. After the Civil War, it became the center of a threatened insurrection by a group of full-blood Creeks against the officially recognized Creek Nation government and the ruling faction, led by Samuel Checote. The dissidents were led by Lochar Harjo and, after Harjo's death, Isparhecher. The rebellion over various issues, such as retention of tribal culture as a way of life and tribal ownership of land, was settled with little bloodshed, though it was called the Green Peach War.

The town was the terminus in 1921 of the Oklahoma-Southwestern Railway, which originated in Bristow and ran through Slick. The town's estimated oilboom population of 600 in 1922 was enough to support daily passenger rail service to Slick and points beyond. However, by 1929, the population was down to about 50, and train service was limited to three times a week. The line was abandoned altogether in 1930.
