= Sulphur Springs, Texas =

- City
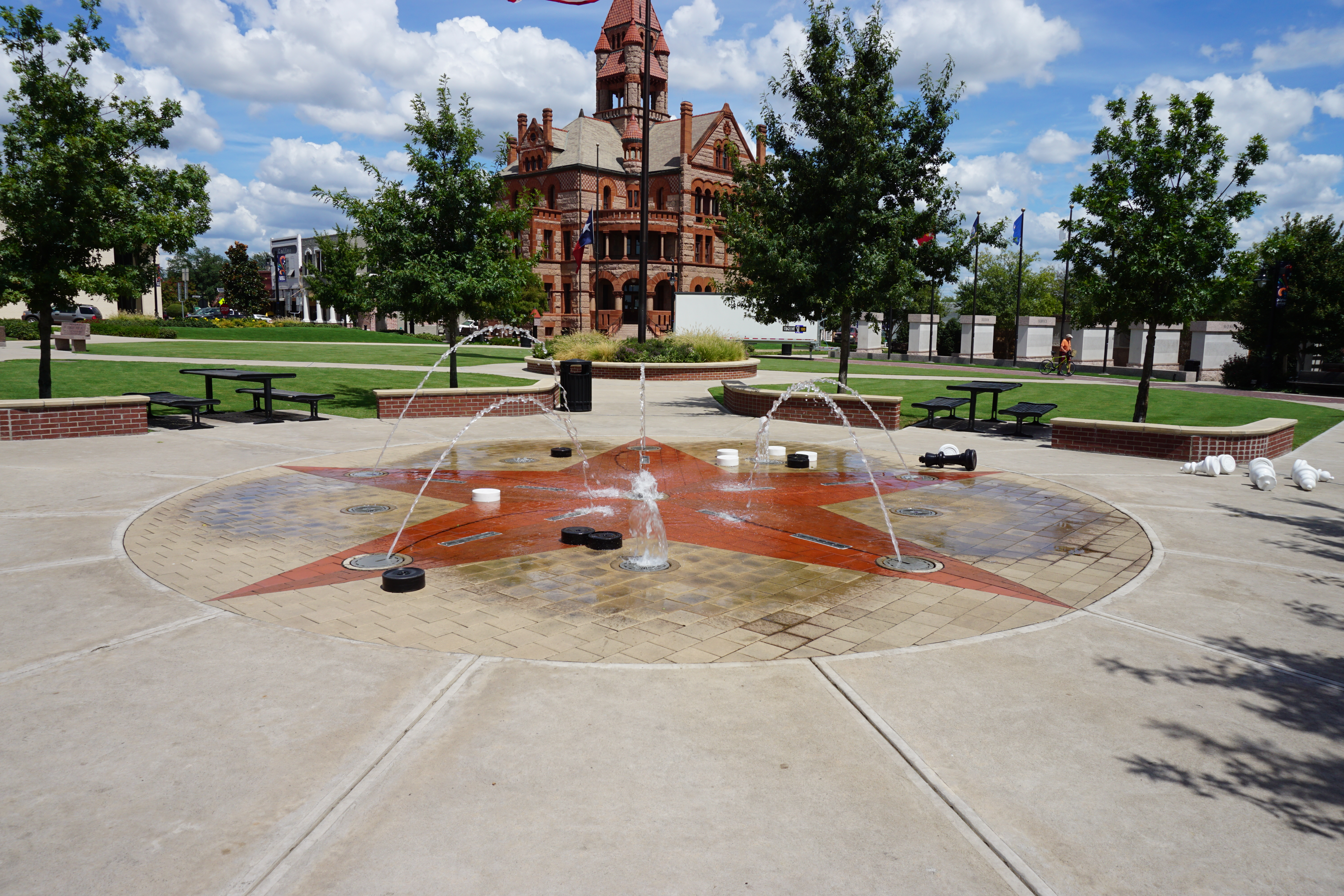
- Sulphur Springs in 2015
- Nickname: The Celebration City
- Motto: “Just Play. Have Fun. Celebrate!”
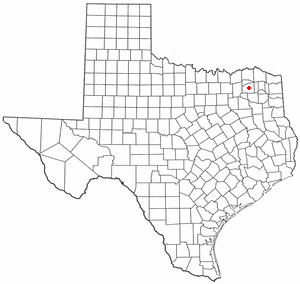
- Location of Sulphur Springs, Texas

- Location within Texas
- Coordinates: 33°8′3″N 95°36′7″W
- Country: United States
- State: Texas
- County: Hopkins

Government
  - Type: Council-manager
  - City Council: Mayor Tyler Law; Mayor Pro Tem Oscar Aguilar Doug Moore; Places 1, 3, and 5 currently vacant
  - City manager: Marc Maxwell

Area
  - Total: 23.92 sq mi (61.94 km^{2})
  - Land: 20.54 sq mi (53.20 km^{2})
  - Water: 3.37 sq mi (8.74 km^{2})
- Elevation: 502 ft (153 m)

Population (2020)
  - Total: 15,941
  - Density: 780/sq mi (300/km^{2})
- Time zone: UTC-6 (Central (CST))
  - Summer (DST): UTC-5 (CDT)
- ZIP codes: 75482-75483
- Area codes: 903, 430
- FIPS code: 48-70904
- GNIS feature ID: 1348056
- Website: www.sulphurspringstx.org

Sulphur Springs is a city in and the county seat of Hopkins County, Texas, United States, its population was 15,941. Sulphur Springs is located in Northeast Texas.

== History ==
=== Early settlers ===
Sulphur Springs [sic] was named so because when the area was first settled, springs of sulfurous water were abundant.

Eli Bib, one of the first European-American settlers, ran a store from his cabin, selling staples, whiskey, persimmon beer, and slabs of ginger cake. In 1849, Dr. and Mrs. Davis moved into the area. Dr. Davis envisioned the spot as a future city. In 1850, the residents organized the area's first church, the Methodist Episcopal. Construction of the church was completed in 1853. In 1852, the Presbyterian Church was organized. At that time, the population of the village was 441. To serve the growing population, commodities began to be brought in from nearby Jefferson. New stores were established.

The village became a city in 1854 when the first post office was established. The city's name was originally "Bright Star". Mail to and from the city was delivered by the Pony Express. On May 18, 1871, the legislature moved the county seat of Hopkins County from Tarrant to Sulphur Springs, and the name "Bright Star" was removed from the postal directory.

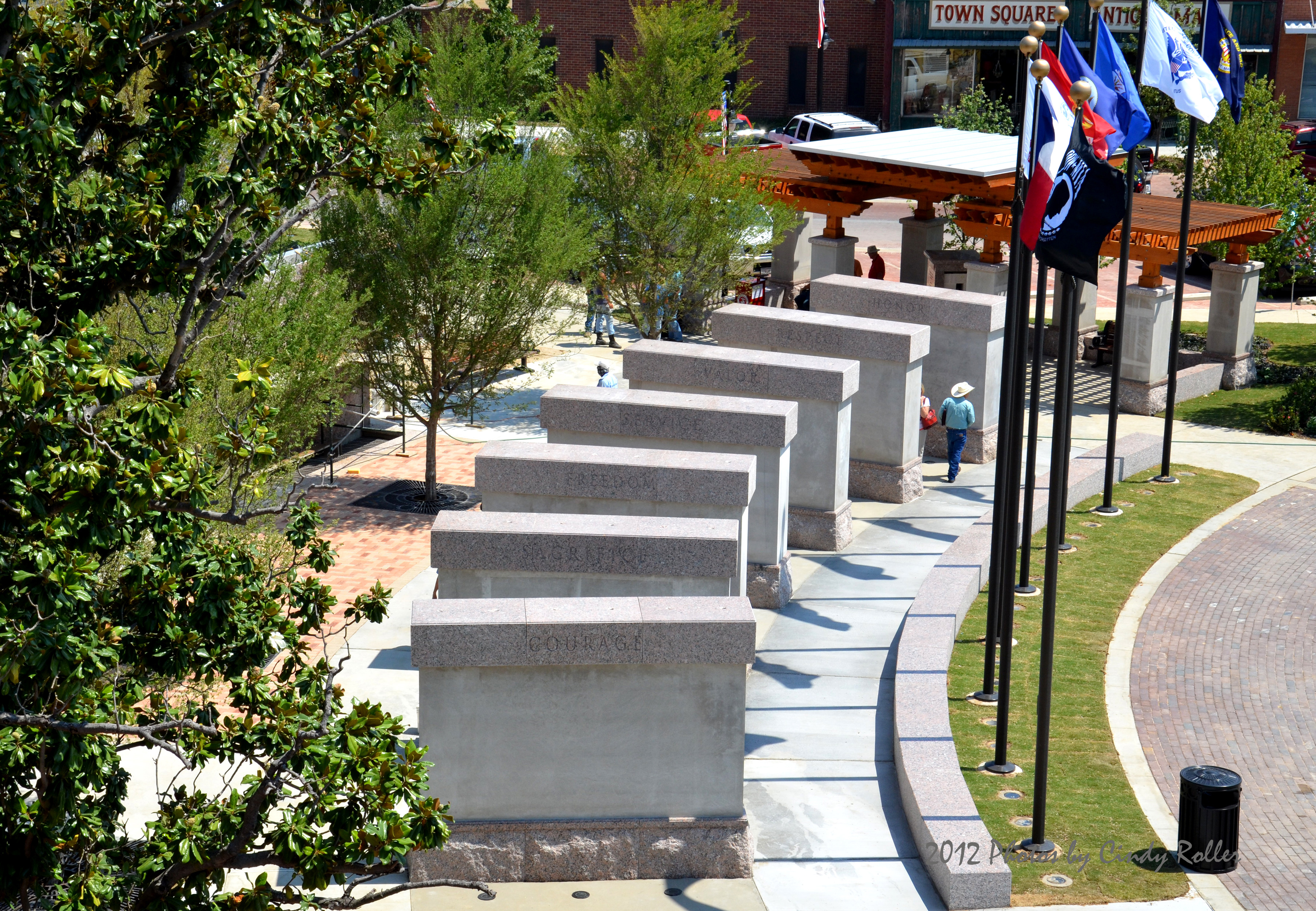
Sulphur Springs Veterans' Memorial at the downtown courthouse

=== Further growth, abundance of newspapers ===
Local government organized slowly. The first known mayor was William A. Wortham. In 1854, Wortham had bought the Texas Star press and moved to Sulphur Springs. His brother-in-law, Bill Davis, and he established the city's first newspaper.

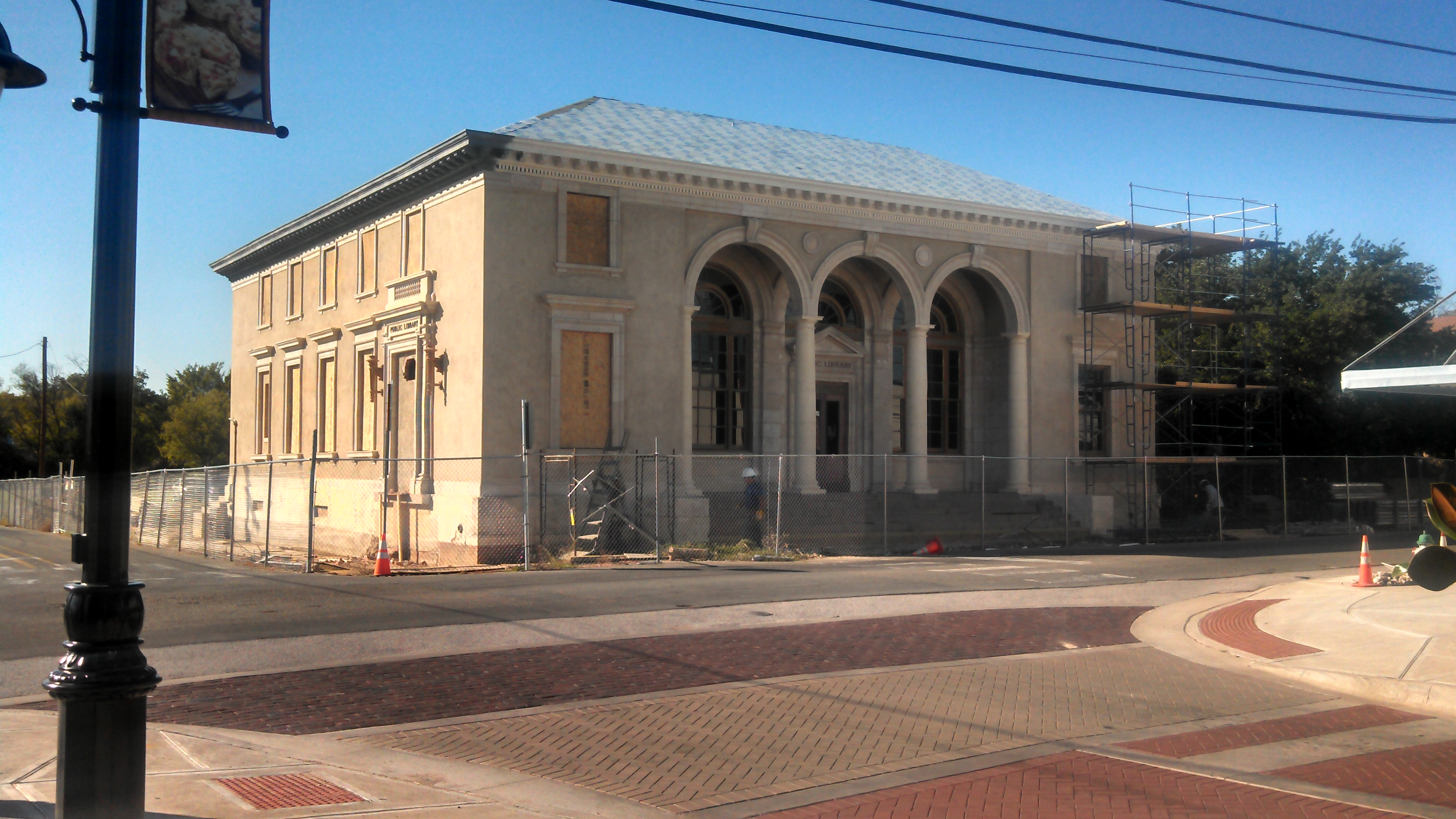
Building being rehabilitated as the new city hall

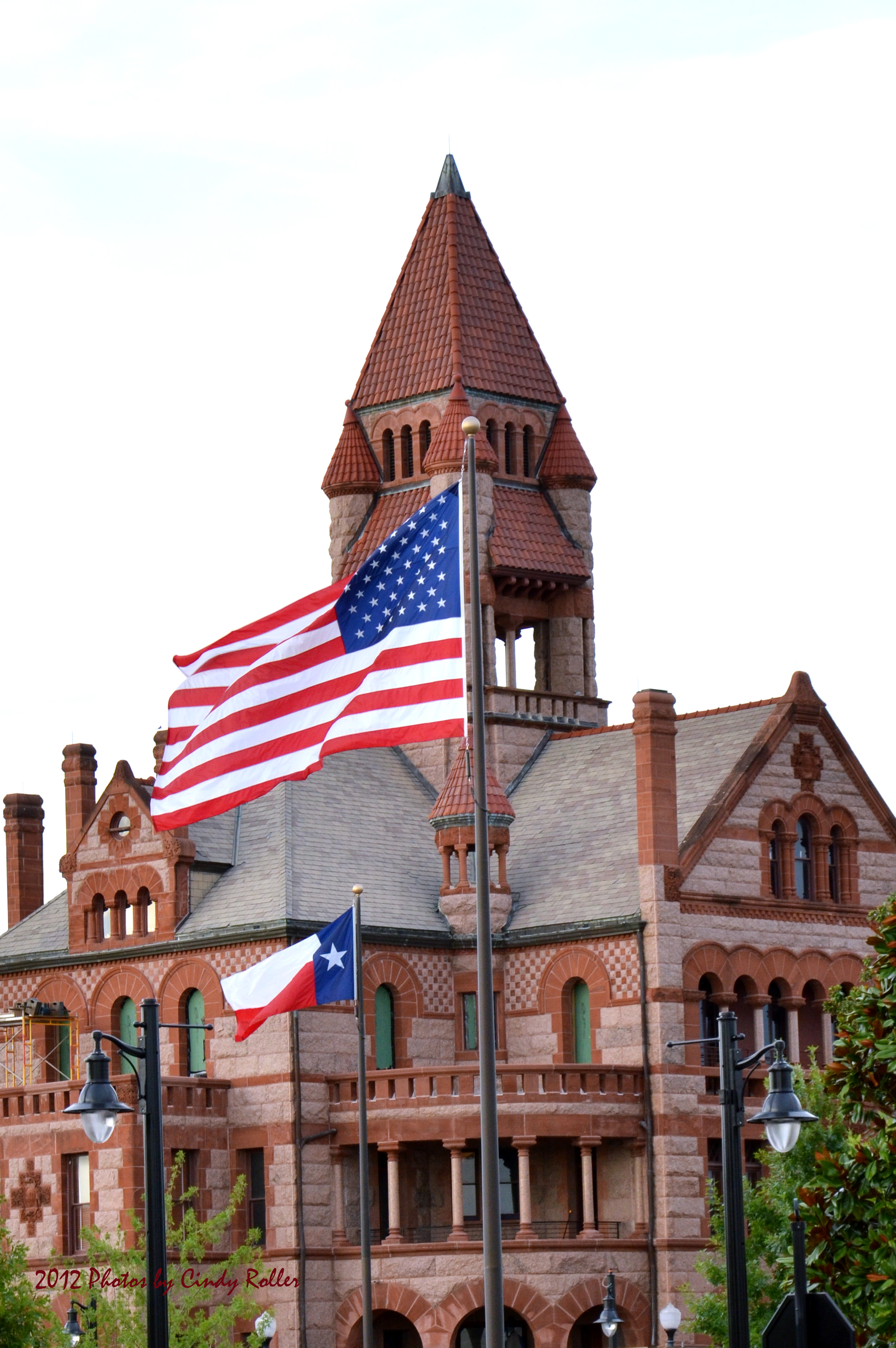
Hopkins County Courthouse in downtown Sulphur Springs

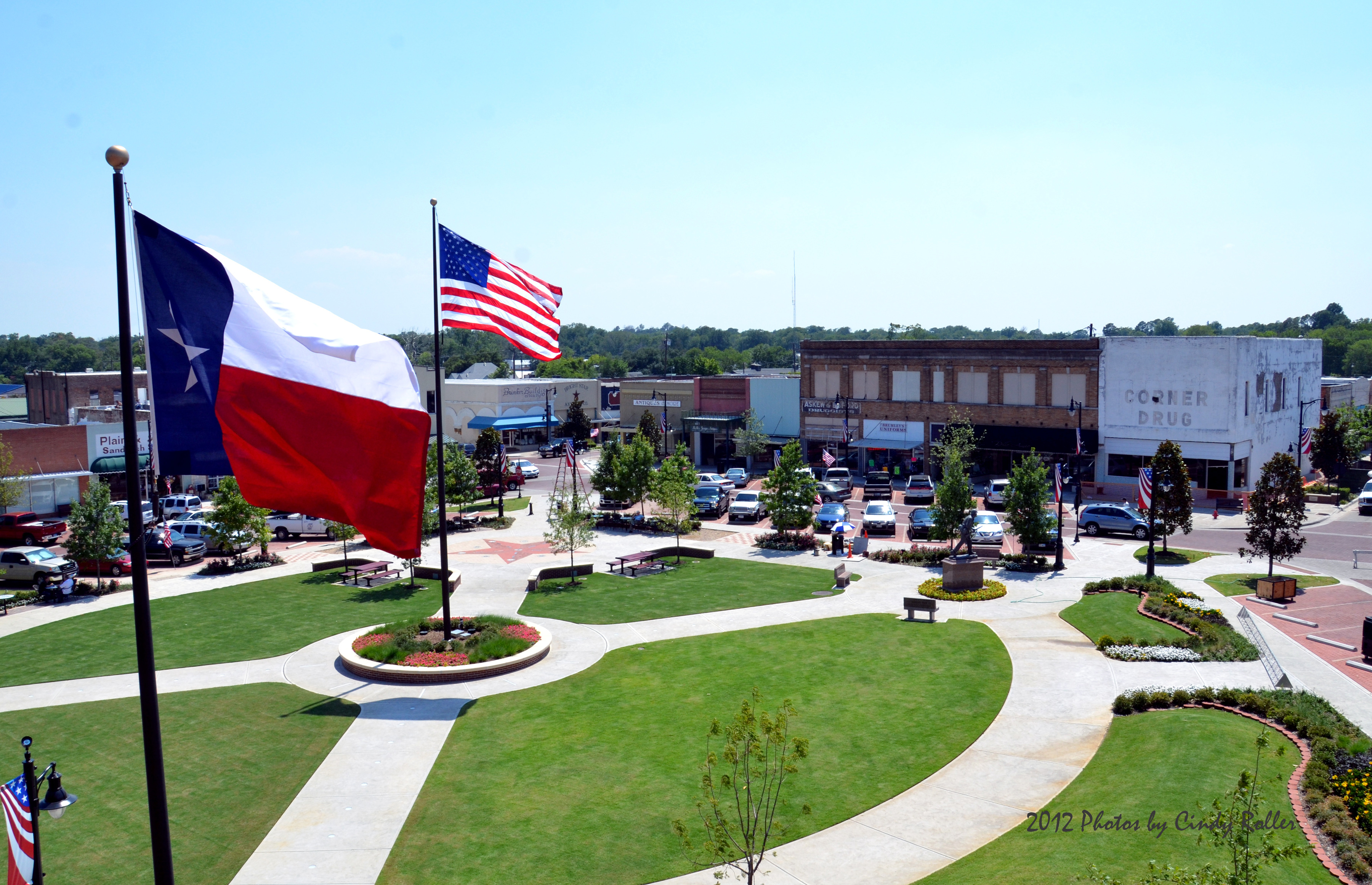
Courthouse Square - ground view of plaza

The county seat had numerous newspapers. Echo Publishing Company was founded in 1897. It was the first steam-powered press in Sulphur Springs. After the first plant was lost to a fire, a new plant was constructed that used gasoline as fuel. In 1884, the Sulphur Springs Enterprise was founded. In the same year, James Harvey "Cyclone" Davis, a Populist (People's Party) US congressman, founded the Alliance Vindicator; it was published until 1901. John S. Bagwell bought the Hopkins County Echo in 1916. In 1924, the Texas Star was merged into the Daily News Telegram. The Daily News Telegram later was renamed the Daily Gazette and still later the Weekly Gazette. Eventually, all these newspapers were merged into the Sulphur Springs News-Telegram and the Hopkins County Echo, both of which still operate.

=== Late 18th, early 19th centuries ===
In 1857, the city set aside 10 acres (40,000 m^{2}) of land for Bright Star University. The Sulphur Springs District Conference High School began in 1877, established on Bright Star University land on College Street. In December 1882, the school became known as Central College. It was owned by the Methodist Episcopal Church. It was later renamed Eastman College and Conservatory of Music and Art under a new charter and after the leading professor. Before 1900, the college burned and Professor Eastman left the area.

The First National Bank of Sulphur Springs received its national charter in 1855. It is now known as City National Bank.

In 1857, the area's first steam-powered factory was established by the Bell brothers. In the same year, the Morro Castle was built on North Street. Its builders remain unknown.

C. Denton was elected to lead the new city government, which was incorporated during the Reconstruction Era. During the Civil War, the town had lost its charter and had to be incorporated again by the state legislature.

In 1868, federal troops moved into Sulphur Springs and occupied the city for two years during Reconstruction, in an effort to protect freedmen after emancipation. Upon their departure and the end of the military occupation, A. J. Bridges was elected as mayor.

The construction of a railroad line from Mineola, Texas, in 1872 stimulated growth in the city. Settlers were drawn by tales of the healing powers of the city's sulfur baths. Due to population growth, the springs of sulfur were gradually covered. None is active today. A rail line was run from Jefferson to Sulphur Springs in 1879. The St. Louis, Arkansas & Texas Railroad (Cotton Belt) was built through Sulphur Springs in 1887 on its way to Commerce and Sherman. The next year, the line was completed to Fort Worth, connecting the city to a major market. In 1891, the bankrupt railroad was sold to Jay Gould interests and renamed the St. Louis Southwestern Railway.

An ice plant was built in 1887. The city's courthouse, which is still used today, was constructed in 1895. In 1904, wells were dug to supply the city with water. In the same year, a long-distance telephone line was run to nearby Greenville. In 1889, the City National Bank was organized.

=== Post-World War II to today ===
After World War II, the city adopted a new council-manager type of government. It stimulated new programs. Industrialization brought new plants and factories to the city. The population has grown as a result, to an estimate of more than 16,000 in 2016.

The dairy industry was a major component of the local economy from the late 1940s through 1995. The Southwest Dairy Museum in the city features artifacts on the history of the dairy industry. The industry began to shrink largely because of declining milk prices, higher labor costs, and large corporations operating industrial-scale dairies.

Large industries in the area today include Pinnacle, Ocean Spray, Grocery Supply, Jeld-Wen, Clayton Home Mfg., Flowserve, and others.

In 2025, a large-scale data center was to be built southeast of downtown Sulphur Springs, spanning over 2,000 acres of land formerly used as a thermo lignite coal mine, just off of Texas state highway 11. The land was to be owned by MSB Global Services. After breaking ground in January 2025, the local government halted construction, and in June 2026 Sulphur Springs mayor Tyler Law announced that MSB Global Services was being phased out due to several lawsuits regarding the Texas Open Meetings Act. Subsequently, the project was taken over by CyrusOne.

== Geography ==
Sulphur Springs is at the center of Hopkins County, roughly halfway between Dallas and Texarkana. Interstate 30 passes through the south side of the city, with access from exits 120 through 127. I-30 leads east 38 miles (61 km) to Mount Pleasant and 100 miles (160 km) to Texarkana, while to the west it leads 30 miles (48 km) to Greenville and 79 miles (127 km) to Dallas. Texas State Highway 19 runs through the western side of Sulphur Springs, leading north 37 miles (60 km) to Paris and southwest 44 miles (71 km) to Canton. Texas State Highway 11 passes through the southern and western sides of Sulphur Springs, leading southeast 23 miles (37 km) to Winnsboro and northwest 20 miles (32 km) to Commerce. Texas State Highway 154 runs through the center of Sulphur Springs as Gilmer Street and Church Street, leading north 21 miles (34 km) to Cooper and south 27 miles (43 km) to Quitman.

According to the United States Census Bureau, Sulphur Springs has a total area of 23.9 square miles (61.9 km^{2}), of which 20.5 square miles (53.2 km^{2}) are land and 3.4 square miles (8.7 km^{2}), or 14.1%, are covered by water. The city is part of the Rock Creek (White Oak Creek) watershed, which flows east to the Sulphur River, a tributary of the Red River.

=== Climate ===
Sulphur Springs has a humid subtropical climate (Köppen Cfa) with long, very hot summers and short, mild winters.

Climate data for Sulphur Springs, Texas (1991–2020 normals, extremes 1893–1910, 1945–present)
Month	Jan	Feb	Mar	Apr	May	Jun	Jul	Aug	Sep	Oct	Nov	Dec	Year
Record high °F (°C)	83 (28)	91 (33)	91 (33)	96 (36)	101 (38)	107 (42)	111 (44)	115 (46)	112 (44)	101 (38)	89 (32)	85 (29)	115 (46)
Mean maximum °F (°C)	74.5 (23.6)	77.9 (25.5)	83.1 (28.4)	86.4 (30.2)	91.6 (33.1)	96.4 (35.8)	101.5 (38.6)	102.5 (39.2)	98.4 (36.9)	91.0 (32.8)	82.0 (27.8)	75.8 (24.3)	103.9 (39.9)
Mean daily maximum °F (°C)	55.2 (12.9)	59.5 (15.3)	67.0 (19.4)	74.9 (23.8)	82.4 (28.0)	89.9 (32.2)	94.2 (34.6)	94.9 (34.9)	88.9 (31.6)	78.2 (25.7)	66.3 (19.1)	57.3 (14.1)	75.7 (24.3)
Daily mean °F (°C)	44.6 (7.0)	48.7 (9.3)	56.1 (13.4)	63.7 (17.6)	72.3 (22.4)	80.2 (26.8)	84.1 (28.9)	84.0 (28.9)	77.4 (25.2)	66.3 (19.1)	55.2 (12.9)	46.7 (8.2)	64.9 (18.3)
Mean daily minimum °F (°C)	34.0 (1.1)	37.8 (3.2)	45.2 (7.3)	52.4 (11.3)	62.2 (16.8)	70.5 (21.4)	73.9 (23.3)	73.1 (22.8)	65.8 (18.8)	54.3 (12.4)	44.1 (6.7)	36.1 (2.3)	54.1 (12.3)
Mean minimum °F (°C)	17.9 (−7.8)	22.1 (−5.5)	26.4 (−3.1)	36.0 (2.2)	45.9 (7.7)	58.8 (14.9)	65.2 (18.4)	63.4 (17.4)	49.9 (9.9)	37.0 (2.8)	26.2 (−3.2)	20.5 (−6.4)	14.8 (−9.6)
Record low °F (°C)	−5 (−21)	−12 (−24)	11 (−12)	27 (−3)	36 (2)	48 (9)	53 (12)	49 (9)	39 (4)	23 (−5)	14 (−10)	−4 (−20)	−12 (−24)
Average precipitation inches (mm)	3.30 (84)	3.63 (92)	4.43 (113)	4.31 (109)	4.30 (109)	4.27 (108)	3.03 (77)	2.92 (74)	2.96 (75)	4.90 (124)	3.98 (101)	4.47 (114)	46.50 (1,181)
Average precipitation days (≥ 0.01 in)	10.4	10.4	10.4	9.3	10.4	8.0	6.1	6.0	6.4	7.9	9.2	10.8	105.3
Source: NOAA IEM

== Demographics ==
Historical population
Census	Pop.	Note	%±
1860	621		—
1870	921		48.3%
1880	1,854		101.3%
1890	3,038		63.9%
1900	3,635		19.7%
1910	5,151		41.7%
1920	5,558		7.9%
1930	5,417		−2.5%
1940	6,742		24.5%
1950	8,991		33.4%
1960	9,160		1.9%
1970	10,642		16.2%
1980	12,804		20.3%
1990	14,062		9.8%
2000	14,551		3.5%
2010	15,449		6.2%
2020	15,941		3.2%
2023 (est.)	16,262		2.0%
U.S. Decennial Census

=== Racial and ethnic composition ===
Sulphur Spring, Texas – Racial and ethnic composition Note: the US Census treats Hispanic/Latino as an ethnic category. This table excludes Latinos from the racial categories and assigns them to a separate category. Hispanics/Latinos may be of any race.
Race / Ethnicity (NH = Non-Hispanic)	Pop 2010	Pop 2020	% 2010	% 2020
White alone (NH)	10,574	10,008	68.45%	62.78%
Black or African American alone (NH)	1,944	1,906	12.58%	11.96%
Native American or Alaska Native alone (NH)	57	83	0.39%	0.52%
Asian alone (NH)	80	155	0.52%	0.97%
Pacific Islander alone (NH)	5	4	0.03%	0.03%
Some Other Race alone (NH)	12	39	0.08%	0.24%
Mixed race or Multiracial (NH)	317	648	2.06%	4.06%
Hispanic or Latino (any race)	2,460	3,098	15.92%	19.43%
Total	15,449	15,941	100.00%	100.00%

=== 2020 census ===
As of the 2020 census, Sulphur Springs had a population of 15,941 and a median age of 37.0 years. Twenty-four point four percent of residents were under the age of 18 and 18.3% of residents were 65 years of age or older. For every 100 females there were 90.6 males, and for every 100 females age 18 and over there were 86.8 males age 18 and over.

As of the 2020 census, 92.1% of residents lived in urban areas, while 7.9% lived in rural areas.

As of the 2020 census, there were 6,232 households in Sulphur Springs, of which 33.2% had children under the age of 18 living in them. Of all households, 43.2% were married-couple households, 17.6% were households with a male householder and no spouse or partner present, and 32.3% were households with a female householder and no spouse or partner present. About 29.9% of all households were made up of individuals and 14.5% had someone living alone who was 65 years of age or older.

As of the 2020 census, there were 6,966 housing units, of which 10.5% were vacant. The homeowner vacancy rate was 1.9% and the rental vacancy rate was 10.6%.

Racial composition as of the 2020 census
Race	Number	Percent
White	10,786	67.7%
Black or African American	1,930	12.1%
American Indian and Alaska Native	133	0.8%
Asian	158	1.0%
Native Hawaiian and Other Pacific Islander	10	0.1%
Some other race	1,384	8.7%
Two or more races	1,540	9.7%
Hispanic or Latino (of any race)	3,098	19.4%

=== 2010 census ===
As of the census of 2010, 15,449 people, 5,959 households, and 3,987 families were residing in the city. The population density was 867 inhabitants per square mile (335/km^{2}). The 6,654 housing units averaged 373 per sq mi (140.3/km^{2}). The racial makeup of the city was 68.4% White, 12.6% African American, 0.4% Native American, 0.5% Asian, 0.11% from other races, and 2.1% from two or more races. Hispanics or Latinos of any race were 15.9% of the population.

Of the 5,959 households, 30.0% had children under the age of 18 living with them, 46.1% were married couples living together, 15.5% had a female householder with no husband present, and 33.1% were not families. About 28.4% of all households were made up of individuals, and 11.9% had someone living alone who was 65 years of age or older. The average household size was 2.53, and the average family size was 3.1 people.

In the city, the age distribution was 28.8% under 18, 6.7% from 19 to 24, 25.3% from 25 to 44, 23.8% from 45 to 64, and 15.5% who were 65 or older. The median age was 36.2 years. For every 100 females, there were 92 males. For every 100 females age 18 and over, there were 88 males.

The median income for a household in the city was $42,701, and for a family was $36,802. Males had a median income of $32,022 versus $20,325 for females. The per capita income for the city was $20,967. About 12.6% of families and 16.4% of the population were below the poverty line, including 19.5% of those under age 18 and 14.3% of those age 65 or over.

== Economy ==
According to the city's 2024 Comprehensive Annual Financial Report, the top 10 employers in the city are:

#	Employer	# of Employees
1	Sulphur Springs ISD	663
2	Grocery Supply Company	540
3	Saputo Foods, Inc.	540
4	Hopkins County Hospital	463
5	Wal-Mart Stores, Inc.	375
6	CMH Manufacturing	293
7	Signature Solar	257
8	Hopkins County	252
9	M&F Western Products	198
10	City of Sulphur Springs	183

== Arts and culture ==
- The city public library has two collections; the Leo St. Clair Music Box Collection includes more than 150 music boxes, and the Sinclair World War II Collection displays letters, pictures and other World War II artifacts.
- The Southwest Dairy Museum and Learning Center depicts all facets of milk production and the history of the dairy industry.
- The Farm and Art Market is located downtown from May through October during the evening. In 2012, American Farmland Trust voted the market “America's Favorite Farmers Market”.

== Parks and recreation ==
Several parks in the city feature recreational opportunities:

- Coleman Lake and Park is a 186-acre (75 ha) park with waterfalls, trails, and ball parks.
- Buford Park is a one-acre park with castle store known as Kid's Kingdom. The local walking trail crosses Pea Vine Pinion pond.
- Hopkins County Museum and Heritage Park features 11 acres (4.5 ha) of historical buildings that have been relocated to the park for restoration and preservation.
- Lake Sulphur Springs, a large lake to the north of the town.
- Cooper State Park, a state park 10 miles northwest from the town which is known for its hiking trails.

== Education ==
The city is served by the Sulphur Springs Independent School District. Sulphur Springs High School has the Wildcats as its sports mascot.

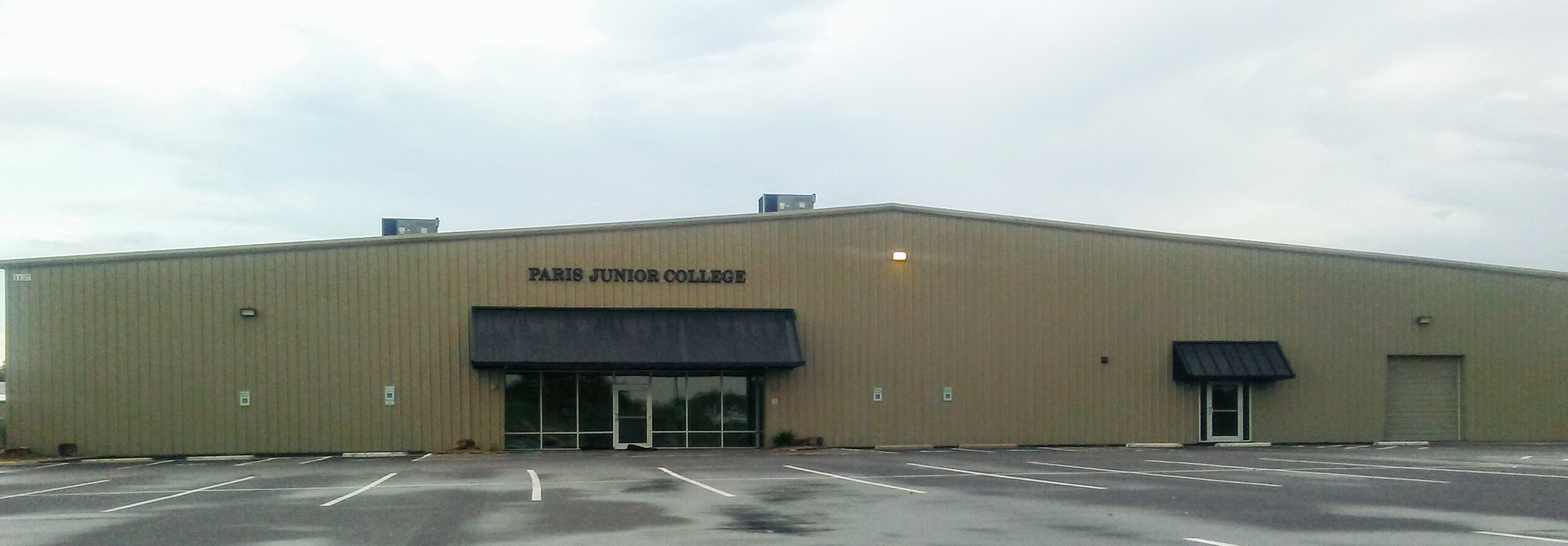
The Paris Junior College location in Sulphur Springs

Sulphur Springs Center Paris Junior College is a post-secondary educational institution located in the city, offering two-year college courses. Texas A&M University–Commerce, a major university of over 12,000 students, has a campus in Commerce, 20 miles (32 km) west of Sulphur Springs.

== Infrastructure ==
=== Transportation ===
==== Intercity ====
Greyhound provides daily service to Dallas and points west, and Texarkana, Arkansas, and all points east, but the city has no bus depot. The Greyhound buses stop at the 7 Star Travel Center

==== Highways ====
Sulphur Springs is served by these highways that run through the city:

- Interstate 30
- U.S. Highway 67 (runs concurrently with Interstate 30)
- State Highway 11
- State Highway 19
- State Highway 154
- State Loop 301

==== Airport ====
The city is served by the Sulphur Springs Municipal Airport. It was named Texas Airport of the Year for 2003 by the Federal Aviation Administration.

==== Railroad ====
Direct class 1 railroad service is provided by the CPKC Railway. Northeast Texas Connector, based in Sulphur Springs, also provides rail access to the town and interchanges with Union Pacific and CPKC.

== Notable people ==
- Earl Black and Merle Black, political scientists
- Kaci Brown, pop singer
- Samuel Benton Callahan, mixed blood Creek Nation politician, lived in Sulphur Springs before and after the American Civil War
- Sophia Alice Callahan, daughter of Samuel Benton Callahan, author of Wynema, a Child of the Forest, lived in Sulphur Springs during and after the American Civil War
- Jim Chapman, former congressman
- Mandy Clark (born Amanda Barney), voice actress
- Keenan Clayton, NFL linebacker
- Steve George, NFL defensive tackle
- Forrest Gregg, SMU football, all Southwest Conference, All-Pro Green Bay Packers, Dallas Cowboys, coach of the Cincinnati Bengals, NFL Hall of Famer
- Tyreo Harrison, NFL linebacker
- Colleen Hoover, New York Times best-selling author
- Damione Lewis, NFL defensive tackle
- Gerald Mann, Texas attorney general and SMU quarterback
- Caleb Miller, NFL linebacker
- Kacey Musgraves, Grammy award-winning country singer
- Gary Panter, artist, illustrator, musician
- Grover Sellers, Texas attorney general
- Donald W. Washington, former Director of the United States Marshals Service
