= Joe Martel III =

Amputee football player from Oklahoma

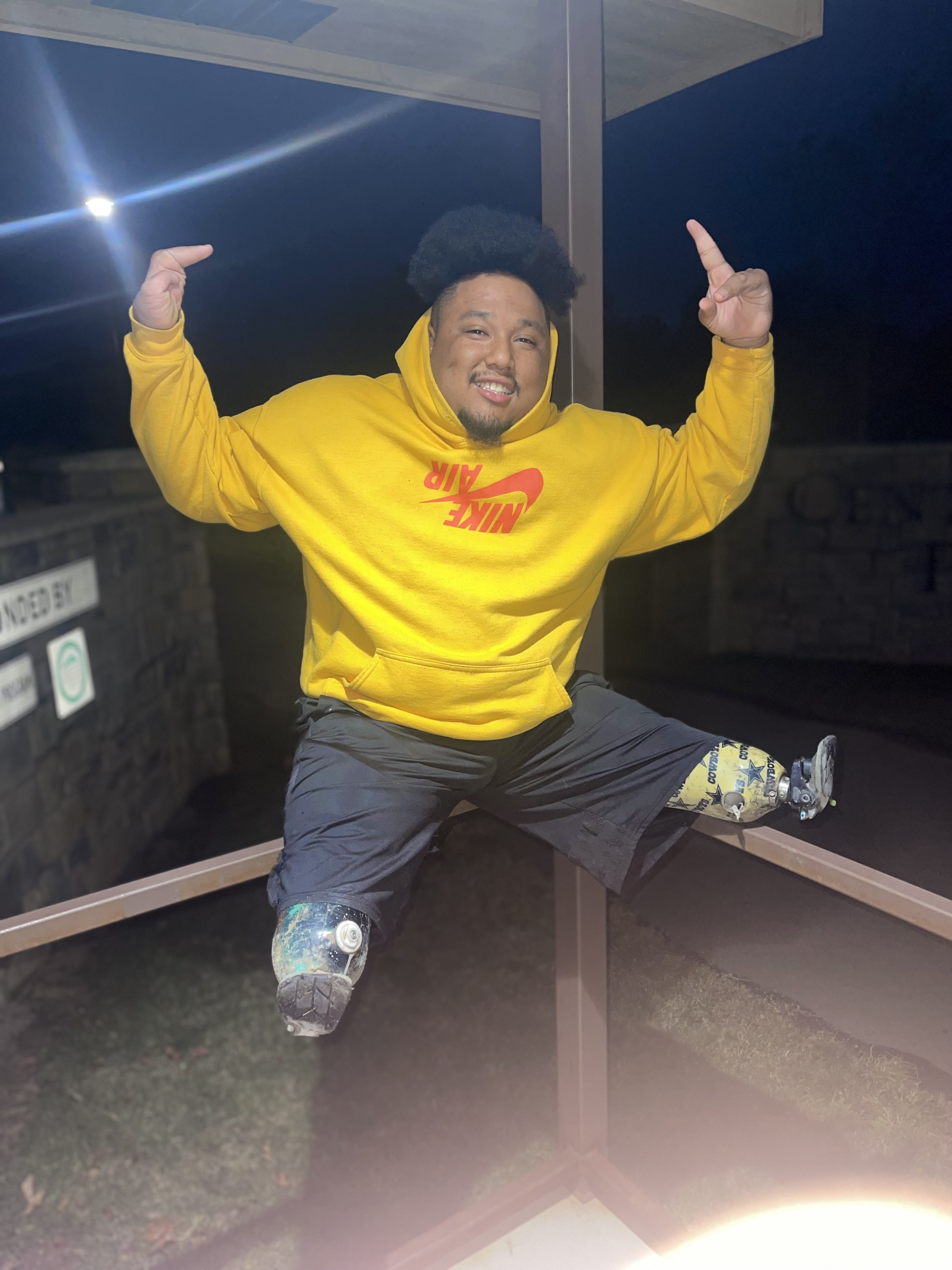
- Born: Joe Martel III; October 14, 2000 (age 26); Okmulgee, Oklahoma
- Other name: Tu
- Education: Beggs High School
- Occupation: Influencer
- Relatives: Mekusapv "Red" Martel (Brother)

Joe Martel III also known as Tu (born October 14, 2000) He is the first known double amputee to play football in the state of Oklahoma without legs making Oklahoma history when he was 14 years old.

== Biography ==
At Beggs High School (Beggs, Oklahoma), 2015-2018 Martel was a three-sport athlete playing football, basketball, and Track & field.

Martel stands 4-foot 3-inches tall with his prosthetics off and with them on he is about 6 foot tall. Martel was born without shin bones a condition known as tibial hemimelia and portions of both legs were amputated when he was just 18 months old.

Martel is now a popular TikToker posting comedy and inspirational videos on his account.
