= Sophia Alice Callahan =

American novelist (1868–1894)

- Born: January 1, 1868; Sulphur Springs, Texas, U.S.
- Died: January 7, 1894 (aged 26); Muskogee, Creek Nation, Indian Territory
- Occupations: Teacher, novelist (one book)
- Years active: 1876–1895
- Known for: First Native American female novelist
- Notable work: Wynema, a Child of the Forest

Sophia Alice Callahan (1 January 1868 – 7 January 1894) was a novelist and teacher of Muscogee heritage. Her novel, Wynema, a Child of the Forest (1891) is thought "to be the first novel written by a Native American woman". Shocked about the Massacre at Wounded Knee at the Pine Ridge Indian Reservation, which took place about six months before she published her book, Callahan added an account of this and the 1890 Ghost Dance of the Lakota to her book in the first fictional treatment of these subjects. This may have been "the first novel written in Oklahoma", which was at the time Indian Territory. Callahan wrote in a romantic novel style but she also clearly intended what has been called a "reform novel", identifying many wrongs suffered by Native Americans in United States society. After being discovered in the late 20th century, the novel was reprinted in 1997. It has been the subject of scholarly studies.

== Early life and education ==
Sophia Alice Callahan was born in Sulphur Springs, Texas, United States, on January 1, 1868, to a father who was culturally Muscogee and mixed-race, with Creek and European ancestry; and a white mother, daughter of a Methodist missionary. Her father, Samuel Benton Callahan, was one-eighth Muscogee-Creek and enrolled in the tribe. He lost his own father during Indian Removal of the Creek to Indian Territory in the 1830s, when the elder man died on the journey. Sophia's mother was Sarah Elizabeth Thornberg.

Sophia Alice Callahan went East for part of her education. After having studied for nearly a year at the Wesleyan Female Institute in Staunton, Virginia, she was qualified in grammar, arithmetic, physics, geography and history.

== Career ==
Subsequent to her schooling, she taught at several different boarding schools in the Creek Nation of Indian Territory. In 1892–3, she worked at Wealaka Mission School, where her father was the superintendent. Late in 1893, she moved to the Methodist-sponsored Harrell International Institute in Muskogee. She also published articles in the school journal, Our Brother in Red.

She married Samuel Callahan, editor of the Indian Journal. He was elected to represent the Creek (Muscogee) and Seminole in the Confederate States Congress from Indian Territory and served as an officer in the Confederate States Army. The family had fled from Indian Territory to Sulphur Springs during the American Civil War. Afterward they returned to their home in Okmulgee, Indian Territory, where Samuel Callahan developed a large farm and cattle ranch.

Having become a member of the Woman's Christian Temperance Union (WCTU) in Muskogee, Callahan explored this and other social movements in her novel, Wynema, a Child of the Forest (1891).

== Later life ==
Callahan last worked for the Indian Mission Conference of the Methodist Episcopal Church, South. She had returned to Wesleyan Female Institute to get a college degree, in order to open her own school in the Creek Nation. However, several other teachers at Harrell had fallen ill during the winter, and she was summoned to return home. After reaching Muskogee, Callahan also fell ill, She had contracted pleurisy and died in Muskogee at the age of 26 on January 7, 1894.

== Bibliography ==
- Bakken, Gordon Moris; Farrington, Brenda (June 26, 2003). Encyclopedia of Women in the American West. SAGE Publications. ISBN 978-1-4522-6526-1.
- Bataille, Gretchen M.; Lisa, Laurie (December 16, 2003). Native American Women: A Biographical Dictionary. Routledge. ISBN 978-1-135-95587-8.
- Chapman, Mary; Mills, Angela (2011). Treacherous Texts: U.S. Suffrage Literature, 1846-1946. Rutgers University Press. ISBN 978-0-8135-4959-0.
- Cox, James Howard; Cox, James H.; Justice, Daniel Heath (August 1, 2014). The Oxford Handbook of Indigenous American Literature. Oxford University Press. ISBN 978-0-19-991403-6.
- Sonneborn, Liz (January 1, 2007). A to Z of American Indian Women. Infobase Publishing. ISBN 978-1-4381-0788-2.
