= Sulphur Springs High School =

Coordinates: 33.138°N 95.620°W

Location
- 1200 Connally; Sulphur Springs, Texas 75482; United States

Information
- School type: Public high school
- School district: Sulphur Springs Independent School District
- Principal: Darius Ingram
- Teaching staff: 103.41 (on an FTE basis)
- Grades: 9-12
- Enrollment: 1,278 (2023–2024)
- Student to teacher ratio: 12.36
- Colors: Royal Blue & Gold
- Athletics conference: UIL Class 4A
- Mascot: Wildcat
- Rival: Greenville Lions
- Newspaper: Wildcat Nation News
- Website: Springs High School

Sulphur Springs High School is a public high school located in Sulphur Springs, Texas, United States and classified as a 4A school by the University Interscholastic League (UIL). It is part of the Sulphur Springs Independent School District located in central Hopkins County. In 2013, the school was rated "Met Standard" by the Texas Education Agency.

== Athletics ==
The Sulphur Springs Wildcats compete in the following sports -

Cross Country, Volleyball, Football, Basketball, Powerlifting, Soccer, Golf, Tennis, Track and Field, Softball, and Baseball

=== State Titles ===
- Football
  - 2008(4A/D2)

== Academics ==
- UIL Academics State Champions
  - 2023(4A), 2026(4A)

== Notable alumni ==
- Keenan Clayton, former professional football player
- Forrest Gregg, former professional football player and coach. Inducted into the Pro Football Hall of Fame in 1977.
- Tyreo Harrison, former professional football player
- Damione Lewis, former professional football player
- Caleb Miller, former professional football player
- Darroh Sudderth, former lead singer of the progressive metal band Fair to Midland
- Colby Suggs, professional baseball coach and former player, current bullpen coach for the Texas Rangers
