= Sulphur Springs Independent School District =

School district in Texas

Location
- Sulphur Springs, Texas United States

District information
- Type: Public School
- Grades: PK-12
- Superintendent: Dr. Deana Steeber

Students and staff
- Athletic conference: UIL Class 4A
- District mascot: Wildcats
- Colors: Royal Blue & Gold

Sulphur Springs Independent School District is a public school district based in Sulphur Springs, Texas (USA).

In 2009, the school district was rated "academically acceptable" by the Texas Education Agency.

== Schools ==
Sulphur Springs ISD operates eight schools and one alternative education center:

- Sulphur Springs High School (Grades 9-12)
- Sulphur Springs Middle (Grades 6-8)
- Sulphur Springs Elementary (Grades 4-5)
- Barbara Bush Primary (Grades K-3)
- Bowie Primary (Grades K-3)
- Rowena Johnson Primary (Grades K-3)
- Travis Primary (Grades K-3)
- Douglass Early Childhood Learning Center (Grades Headstart, PK)
- Austin Alternative Education
