= Lighthorse (American Indian police) =

Former Indigenous American mounted police force

Current boundaries of the Five Tribes.

Lighthorse (or Light Horse) is an official or colloquial name for the police forces of federally recognized tribes in the United States. Some tribal governments officially refer to their police as Lighthorse while others do not. Historically, the term referred to the Five Civilized Tribes of the United States' mounted police forces. The Lighthorse were generally organized into companies and assigned to different districts. Perhaps the most famous were the Cherokee Lighthorsemen which had their origins in Georgia. Due to the Indian Removal Act, the Five Civilized Tribes were forcibly removed to Indian Territory, where the modern day Lighthorse Police Departments have their precincts.

== Pre-colonial forms of policing ==
Before European contact, many tribes maintained order through social values rather than formal policing. These values were based on kinship: respecting one’s relatives and avoiding behavior that could embarrass the family encouraged people to follow community expectations. Social ridicule was often a natural way to maintain harmony within the tribe.

When an offense occurred, tribes generally used negotiation and compensation to repair the harm. The greatest consequence was often the shame brought upon the person and their family. If private negotiation did not work, the issue could be handled by influential members, such as chiefs and other representatives.

Punishments varied depending on the situation. They could involve giving valuable goods, such as horses, destroying the offender’s property, physical punishment, or, in some cases, “blood revenge,” a practice that was later exaggerated in many colonial accounts.

== Cherokee ==
In 1795, the Cherokees created organizations called "regulating companies" to deal with horse theft and other property crimes. The regulating companies were a mounted tribal police force, empowered to enforce tribal laws. They began to be called "Lighthorsemen" in the 1820s. Their authority expanded to apprehending criminals, whom they turned over to tribal courts for trial and sentencing. The Lighthorsemen's scope was then extended to more serious crimes including murder, rape and robbery. They also enforced the tribal laws against drunkenness. One author asserted that the Cherokees took the force's name from General Henry "Lighthorse Harry" Lee, who got the nickname because his cavalry moved so quickly.

On November 13, 1844, the Cherokee National Council authorized the formation of a lighthorse company. It was composed of a captain, a lieutenant, and twenty four horsemen. They were to arrest all fugitives from justice in the Cherokee Nation. For several years the lighthorsemen also served as judges and jurors, administering punishments themselves. Usually, they punished those convicted of minor crimes by whipping and worse crimes cause 100 to 300 lashes, getting the ears cut off, or even death. In 1874, the Cherokees built a prison at Tahlequah. It was the only Native Nation to do so.

== Chickasaw ==
In 1829, Levi Colbert and a group of Mixed-blood Chickasaws created a code of laws to protect Chickasaw property, which led to the creation of their Lighthorse corps by the Chickasaw National Council. These corps included 25 men from each of the tribal districts, 100 Lighthorsemen in total.After forced removal in 1836 to Indian Territory, in which many Chickasaw lives were lost in the process, the Chickasaw Lighthorse corps were disbanded. Although other law enforcement groups were established after the Chickasaw Constitution was created, separating the Chickasaws from the Choctaw nation, Lighthorse would not be the name used for the Chickasaw police force until 2004, when the Chickasaw Lighthorse Police Department (LPD) was reformed.

Today, the Chickasaw LPD has jurisdiction over 13 counties in Oklahoma, divided in 3 Precincts (WinStar, Ada, Newcastle) and has 105 full time law enforcement officers.

== Choctaw ==
The Treaty of Doak's Stand in 1820 appropriated US$600 per year to the Choctaw Nation to organize and maintain the Choctaw Lighthorsemen. These men were given the authority to arrest, try and punish those who broke tribal laws. The first corps became operational in 1824. Peter Pitchlynn became the head of this force in 1825. After the Choctaws were forcibly removed to Indian Territory, as part of the Indian Removal (1831–1833), the Lighthorsemen reported to the tribal Chief.

The Choctaw Constitution of 1838 specified that it "shall be the duty of any of the light horsemen to proclaim to the candidates or their representatives to form into separate lines; the voters forming in a line with such candidates as they wish to elect; and there shall be two or more judges appointed by the Captain of the Light-horse company to determine the number of electors in each line, and their qualifications; and one of said judges shall publicly state the number of voters in each line, and proclaim the person having the highest number elected;"

According to historian Carolyn Foreman, the treaty stipulated "that all men, both white and red, may be compelled to pay their just debts, it is stipulated and agreed, that the sum of two hundred dollars shall be appropriated by the United States, for each district, annually, and placed in the hands of the agent, to pay the expenses incurred in raising and establishing said corps; which is to act as executive officers, in maintaining good order, and compelling bad men to remove from the nation, who are not authorized to live In it by a regular permit from the agent."

Called Issuba Vmbinili Tʋshka ("Perched Horse Warrior") in the Choctaw language, Lighthorsemen rode their own horses and used their own weapons.

== Muscogee (Creek) ==
The Muscogee were removed to Indian Territory in the winter of 1836–1837. When they arrived, they preserved their original form of government and continued their system of law enforcement.

At the outbreak of the Civil War, the Confederate States of America (CSA) made a treaty with the Creek Nation. Among many other provisions, the CSA promised to provide CS$600 per year for the support of lighthorsemen.

During 1882–1883, a group of dissident Creeks led by Isparhecher revolted against the leadership of Principal Chief Samuel Checote. Checote responded by ordering the Creek Lighthorsemen to put down the rebellion. He soon put Pleasant Porter as the leader of the lighthorsemen. Porter and his men were successful in forcing the dissidents to leave Creek territory and take refuge in Sac and Fox territory and later in Kiowa territory. The dissidents found they were unwelcome in both places. They returned to make peace with the majority of the tribe. Porter later became principal chief of the Creek Nation (1899–1907).

== Seminole ==
The Seminoles were the last of the Five Civilized Tribes to establish their own police force, as their removal to Indian Territory had a tremendous impact on them. The Seminoles resisted removal and were at war with the United States from 1835 to 1842, during which they were gradually forced to relocate to Indian Territory.

Impacted by the removal, the Seminoles had no funds for that, and during the American Civil War, the Seminole Government was dysfunctional. In 1876 Governor John Brown hired A. Q. Teague, a young cattle drover from Texas, as the first lighthorseman.

== Changes in Native criminal justice ==
A series of laws gradually took away tribes’ authority to police and try their own members.

In 1817, the General Crimes Act extended federal jurisdiction to crimes on Native land involving a non-Indigenous person and an Indigenous person. However, it did not apply to crimes committed by one Indigenous person against another. The act specifically stated that it “shall not extend to offenses committed by one Indian against the person or property of another Indian”.

This changed in the 1880s. In the case Ex Parte Crow Dog, a Lakota man named Crow Dog was tried in a federal court for killing Spotted Tail. He argued that, since the incident involved only Indigenous people, he should be judged under tribal law, not federal law. The Supreme Court ruled in his favor. Still, because Spotted Tail was a pro-government-leaning chief, the United States responded by passing the Major Crimes Act in 1885. This law greatly reduced Indigenous sovereignty by placing certain crimes under federal authority, even when they were committed between members of the same tribe.

In the 1978 Oliphant v. Suquamish Indian Tribe case, the Supreme Court ruled that Native American tribes did not have the authority to prosecute non-Indigenous people for crimes committed on tribal land.
