= Caleb Miller =

American football player (born 1980)

No. 58
- Position: Linebacker

Personal information
- Born: September 3, 1980 (age 46); Seguin, Texas, U.S.
- Listed height: 6 ft 3 in (1.91 m)
- Listed weight: 225 lb (102 kg)

Career information
- High school: Sulphur Springs (TX)
- College: Arkansas
- NFL draft: 2004: 3rd round, 80th overall pick

Career history
- Cincinnati Bengals (2004–2007)

Awards and highlights
- Second-team All-SEC (2003)

Career NFL statistics
- Total tackles: 164
- Sacks: 1
- Fumble recoveries: 3
- Pass deflections: 6
- Stats at Pro Football Reference

Caleb Miller (born September 3, 1980) is an American former professional football player who was a linebacker in the National Football League (NFL). He was selected by the Cincinnati Bengals in the third round of the 2004 NFL draft with the 80th overall pick. He played college football for the Arkansas Razorbacks.

== Early life ==
Miller was a three-year starter for the Razorbacks at outside linebacker, after an all-state senior year at Sulphur Springs, Texas.

== College career ==
Miller was the Defensive MVP of the 2003 Independence Bowl after registering 16 tackles in the game. Arkansas Razorbacks finished the year at 9–4, and Miller was a 2nd team Southeastern Conference selection.
