= 2003 Independence Bowl =

Missouri Tigers	Arkansas Razorbacks
(8–4)	(8–4)
Big 12	SEC
14	27
Head coach: Gary Pinkel	Head coach: Houston Nutt
	1	2	3	4	Total
Missouri	7	0	7	0	14
Arkansas	3	18	3	3	27
- Date: December 31, 2003
- Season: 2003
- Stadium: Independence Stadium
- Location: Shreveport, Louisiana
- MVP: Cedric Cobbs; Caleb Miller
- Referee: Walt Davenport (Sun Belt)
- Attendance: 49,625
- Payout: US$2,504,112

United States TV coverage
- Network: ESPN
- Announcers: Sean McDonough, Mike Golic, Rod Gilmore and Rob Stone

The 2003 Independence Bowl was a post-season college football bowl game between the Missouri Tigers and the Arkansas Razorbacks on December 31, 2003, at Independence Stadium in Shreveport, Louisiana. Missouri was making their first bowl appearance since 1998. This was Missouri's first bowl game under Head Coach Gary Pinkel. Arkansas, on the other hand, made their sixth straight bowl appearance, but had lost the last three.

Arkansas defeated Missouri 27–14, winning their first bowl game since the 2000 Cotton Bowl. It was Arkansas' first victory in the Independence Bowl. Missouri fell to (8–5) on the season, while Arkansas improved to (9–4). This was the Hogs' second bowl victory under head coach Houston Nutt. It would be the Hogs last bowl victory until 2009 when they won the Liberty Bowl.

The Tigers opened the game with a 7–3 lead after the first quarter, but Arkansas rallied back, scoring 18 unanswered points to take a 21–7 lead into halftime. Mizzou cut the Hogs lead to 21–14 with a third quarter touchdown. But Arkansas answered with two field goals, one in the third and one in the fourth, to seal the victory for the Razorbacks. The Hogs outdueled the Tigers in every facet of the game, to include a blocked punt against Missouri in the second half.

Arkansas running back Cedric Cobbs was named the game's Offensive MVP, rushing for 141 yards and a touchdown. The game's Defensive MVP was Razorback linebacker Caleb Miller, who finished the game with 14 tackles and an interception.

== See also ==
- Battle Line Rivalry
