= Oklahoma-Southwestern Railway =

Overview
- Locale: Oklahoma
- Dates of operation: 1920–1930

Technical
- Track gauge: 4 ft 8 1/2 in (1,435 mm) standard gauge
- Length: 28.31 mi (45.56 km)

The Oklahoma-Southwestern Railway (“OSR”) ran between Bristow, Oklahoma and Nuyaka, Oklahoma. It operated from 1920 to 1930 before being abandoned.

== History ==
Incorporated January 12, 1920 by legendary Oklahoma oilman T.B. Slick, the OSR was intended to service Oklahoma oilfields, and was originally projected to run about 50 miles from Bristow to Okmulgee, then an active refining center. Starting from a connection with the St. Louis-San Francisco Railway at Bristow and heading generally southeast, the line was built in 1920 through the Bristow oil field to Slick, Oklahoma, about 12 miles, where a large depot was constructed to handle the crowds that flocked to Slick to "get rich from the gushing black gold." The line terminated in Nuyaka, Oklahoma in 1921, about another 11.9 miles, never reaching Okmulgee. The railroad also built two spurs northerly from the mainline, the Rock Creek spur extending into the Continental oil fields about 3.14 miles, and the Chicken Creek spur extending from a point near the town of Slick to the oil fields to its north, about 1.31 miles. Together with the 23.86-mile mainline, this put the total trackage of the OSR at 28.31 miles.

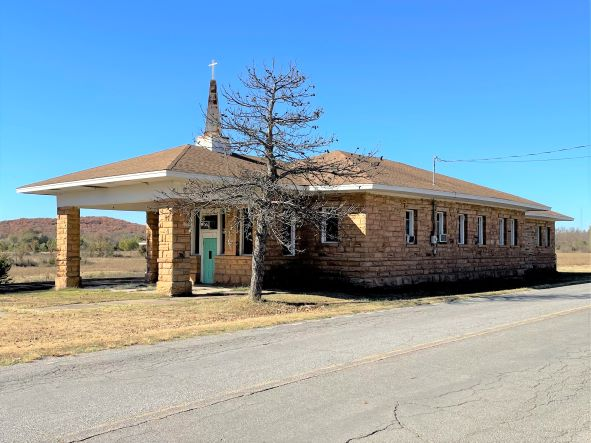
Former railroad depot at Slick, Oklahoma, later a church, in October 2022.

The standard-gauge, steam operated railroad, while primarily a freight carrier, did have passenger operations. Three regular passenger trains ran daily in each direction between Bristow and Slick, and another operated daily between Slick and Nuyaka.

But the good times were not to last. Production of oil began to decline in the latter part of 1923, and other methods of transportation, such as pipelines and motor vehicles, eventually took half the cargo the railway might have carried. The production downturn caused the towns along the line to experience a loss of population, with Slick going from a 1922 estimated population of 2500-3500 to 150 by the end of 1929, and Nuyaka dropping from about 600 to about 50 in the same period. By 1929, the railroad was losing money, and passenger service was down to one mixed train doing a round trip three times a week. Total passenger revenues for the first six months of 1929 were said to be $5.30.

The Interstate Commerce Commission authorized abandonment of the line on December 21, 1929. Operations were suspended January 31, 1930, and the track was dismantled soon thereafter.
