= GSC Enterprises, Inc. =

American retailer

GSC Enterprises, Inc
- “Big enough for the job, small enough to care.”
- Company type: Private
- Industry: Distribution; Financial services
- Founded: 1947 in Mount Vernon, Texas, United States
- Headquarters: Sulphur Springs, Texas
- Key people: Michael K. McKenzie (Chairman of the Board); Ryan McKenzie (COO)
- Revenue: $1.17 Billion (2005)
- Number of employees: 1,150
- Divisions: Fidelity Express
- Website: www.grocerysupply.com www.fidelityexpress.co

GSC Enterprises, Inc. is a company that has two major business segments: Grocery Supply Company specializing in convenience store distribution and Fidelity Express specializing in bill payment and money order processing.

== Grocery Supply Company ==
Grocery Supply Company was founded in 1947 by Ken McKenzie, Curtis McKenzie, and Woodrow Brittain in Mount Vernon, Texas. The company was created to supply food and other products to grocery stores in the area. In 1953, the company moved to its present location in Sulphur Springs, Texas. By 1991, the company had grown substantially and was even listed on Forbes list of top 500 private companies. Today, Grocery Supply Company continues to be one of the top distributors for convenience stores in the Midwest and Southern United States. Grocery Supply Company serves the following states: Texas, Oklahoma, Arkansas, Kansas, Missouri, Louisiana, Mississippi, New Mexico, and Nebraska.

== Fidelity Express ==
"Real-time, Real Service, Real People."

Fidelity Express was founded in 1988 by GSC Enterprises. Fidelity offers bill payment and money order processing to convenience stores throughout the United States, since its inception Fidelity has been a leader in walk-in bill payment and money order processing. Fidelity Express serves convenience stores in the following 19 states: Alabama, Arkansas, District of Columbia, Florida, Georgia, Illinois, Kansas, Kentucky, Louisiana, Maryland, Missouri, Mississippi, North Carolina, New Mexico, Oklahoma, South Carolina, Tennessee, Texas, Virginia, and West Virginia
