= Pleasant Porter =

Muscogee statesman

- Tvlof Haco
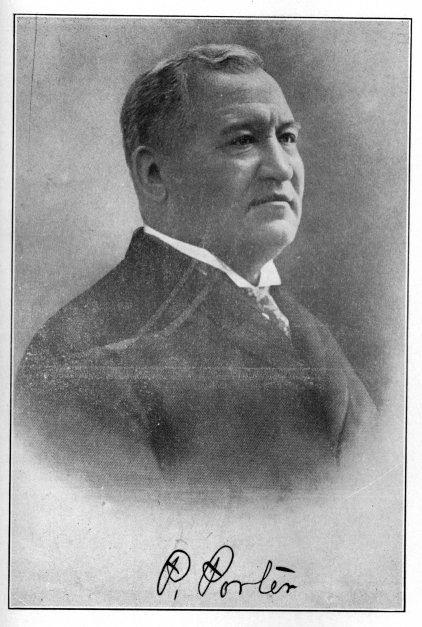

Principal Chief of the Creek Nation
- In office 1899–1907

President of the Sequoyah Constitutional Convention
- In office August 21, 1905 – September 8, 1905
- Vice President: Green McCurtain; William C. Rogers
- Deputy: Alexander Posey

Muscogee Delegate to the United States
- In office 1872–1899
- Preceded by: D. N. McIntosh
- Succeeded by: Position abolished

Personal details
- Born: Talof Harjo; September 26, 1840 Indian Territory (now Wagoner County, Oklahoma)
- Died: September 3, 1907 (aged 66) Vinita, Indian Territory
- Party: Republican

Military service
- Allegiance: Muscogee Nation; Confederate States
- Branch/service: Confederate States Army
- Rank: Quartermaster Sergeant
- Unit: First Creek Regiment
- Battles/wars: American Civil War; Battle of Round Mountain; Battle of Chusto-Talasah; Battle of Chustenahlah; Battle of Elkhorn Tavern; Battle of Honey Springs

Pleasant Porter (Creek: Tvlof Haco; September 26, 1840 – September 3, 1907) was an American Indian statesman and the last elected Principal Chief of the Creek Nation, serving from 1899 until his death.

He had served with the Confederacy in the 1st Creek Mounted Volunteers, as superintendent of schools in the Creek Nation (1870), and as commander of the Creek Light Horsemen (1883). He was elected several times as the Creek delegate (non-voting status) to the United States Congress. In 1905 he was President of the Sequoyah Constitutional Convention, an effort by Native American tribes to acquire statehood for the Indian Territory. Congress did not approve their proposal, instead passing legislation to extinguish their land rights and make their territory part of the new state of Oklahoma in 1907.

== Early life ==
Pleasant Porter was born on September 26, 1840, to Benjamin Edward Porter and Phoebe Perryman (Creek). She and her mother were of mixed-race, with some European ancestry in her grandfather's line; she was the daughter of Lydia Perryman and Tah-lo-pee Tust-a-nuk-kee, a town chief. (Her mother Lydia was a daughter of Chief Perryman and his wife.) Porter was considered born into his mother's Bird Clan, as the Creek had a matrilineal kinship system. Children took their social status from their mother's family and clan.

He was born in the Creek Nation, Indian Territory, in what is now Wagoner County, Oklahoma. His Creek name was Talof Harjo, which means "Crazy Bear" in English.

His paternal grandfather, John Snodgrass Porter, had founded a family ranch here. He had fought with Andrew Jackson against the Creek in Georgia after the massacre at Fort Mims. To minimize further bloodshed, Captain Porter volunteered to mediate between the Creek leaders and white army. Grateful for his efforts, the Creek adopted him as an honorary member of the tribe.

They allowed him to settle on Creek land in Russell County, Alabama. When the federal government began urging Indian Removal to west of the Mississippi River, John Porter moved with the first group of Lower Creek, who went to Indian Territory in the 1820s. There, he settled on the north bank of the Arkansas River. He developed a plantation based on the labor of enslaved African Americans.

As John Porter was dying in 1847, family members gathered around his deathbed. His grandson Pleasant was seven. According to historian John Meserve, Porter put his hand on the boy's head and announced to the family, "He will do more than any of you."

Pleasant Porter was educated at the Tullahassee Mission School on the Creek Nation, where he studied for five years. He grew up in a bi-cultural environment, and he was fluent in both Muscogee and English. This gave him an advantage in operating in both the white and Creek worlds as an adult. He supplemented this basic education by developing a lifelong habit of study at home. After leaving school, he clerked in a store for some time. He traveled to New Mexico, where he drove cattle until the outbreak of the Civil War.

== Civil War service ==
During the Civil War, Porter served in the First Confederate Creek Regiment. Most of the Creek had allied with the Confederacy, whose leaders promised to establish an all-Indian state if they were victorious. He had enlisted as a Private under the command of Col. D. N. McIntosh. (He was the son of chief William McIntosh, who had been a prominent leader in the treaty party. They had agreed to cede communal lands in the homeland and remove to Indian Territory without gaining consensus. McIntosh was later executed by opponents for this action.)

Porter participated in several battles, including Round Mountain, Chusto-Talasah (Bird Creek), Chustenahlah, Pea Ridge and Honey Springs. He was wounded three times, once in the thigh. He walked with a limp for the rest of his life. Twice he was wounded in the head. His highest rank was Quartermaster Sergeant.

== Creek political life ==
In 1865, after the end of the war, Porter served as a guard for Creek commissioners who traveled to Fort Smith, Arkansas, to begin peace negotiations with U. S. government representatives. The US required a new peace treaty following the war, one that included emancipation of Creek-owned enslaved African Americans. The Creek government reorganized in 1866.

Porter was asked by Creek Nation leaders to reorganize the schools, which had been disrupted by the war. Most of the missionaries who had established schools had left the Territory during the war. In 1871, Porter was reelected as superintendent of schools, but declined a second term.

=== Tribal insurrections ===
The "Sands Rebellion" of 1871 was the culmination of grievances between two Creek factions. These had roots to divisions in the society from the Southeast, between the Lower Creek, who tended to have lived more closely near European Americans and had more interaction with them. They had more members and leaders of mixed-blood or partial European ancestry, and more of their men had received some European-American education. The Upper Creek, by contrast, had been more isolated from European-American culture, were still primarily full-blood Creek in ancestry, and kept to traditional ways. Even decades after removal to Indian Territory, divisions remained among the Creek. In 1871 the name "Sands" refers to the leader of a disgruntled group of Upper Creek led by Oktars-sars-har-jo (known in English as "Sands".)

When Principal Chief Samuel Checote convened a National Creek Council in October 1871, nearly 300 Sands followers marched on the capital and dispersed the meeting. Pleasant Porter, commanding a group of Creek horsemen, together with a group of Federal agents, put down the short-lived rebellion without loss of life. Porter convinced the Sands followers to lay down their arms and go home.

In the fall of 1872, the Creek Nation selected Porter as a delegate to Washington, D.C., to represent the nation's interests with Congress and the government. He performed this work so effectively that he served for much of his life on business in the national capital. He soon became well-known and respected by members of Congress and several presidents, and was befriended by President Theodore Roosevelt.

In 1875, Lachar Harjo was elected Principal Chief to replace Checote. Checote supporters controlled the Creek legislature and impeached Harjo, replacing him with a Checote supporter. Porter was called on to quell the subsequent demonstration and convinced the Haijo supporters to go home.

In 1882, Judge Isparhecher, from Okmulgee, was charged with sedition by the Creek National Council and removed from office. He gathered about 350 followers of Sands and Haijo, established a military camp and formed a rival government, complete with armed light horsemen.

Checote recalled Porter from Washington and put him in charge of about 700 men. He attacked the opponents camp, beginning what historian Meserve says the Creek called the "Green Peach War". Porter's troops chased their opponents into Sac and Fox territory in February 1883. Isparhecher and his remaining followers tried to gain asylum with the Kiowa, but U.S. troops captured them and sent them to Fort Gibson. According to Meserve, there were seven or eight casualties in the Green Peach War. Afterward, some Creek began calling Porter "General" as an honorific title.

Isparhecher remained the de facto leader of the full-bloods (then known as the Nuyaka faction). When Checote stepped down as principal chief in 1883, an election elevated a follower of Isparhecher to the position, narrowly defeating Isparhecher himself. Checote came in a distant third. Isparhecher served briefly in December 1883. On February 24, 1884, the Indian Agent at Muskogee, under orders from the Secretary of the Interior, whose department administered Native American affairs, officially recognized Joseph Perryman as the principal chief, although he was not elected by the council.

Under the terms of the Dawes Act, the Creek Nation had to agree to an allotment of former tribal lands to individual households, in an effort to force adaptation to European-American styles of farming and property ownership. Porter headed another Creek commission to negotiate the terms with Federal officials. Agreement was announced September 27, 1897, and incorporated as part of the Curtis Act, passed by Congress in June 1898. The US insisted that any land remaining after allotment would be considered "surplus" and made available for sale to non-Indians. Although the agreement was rejected by the Creek in an election on November 1, 1898, the Dawes Commission began to register tribal members for the process of allotment.

Porter headed a delegation to Washington, C. C. in January 1889 to negotiate the terms for turning over some more of their land to the United States, as required by the 1866 peace treaty. At the time the treaty was signed, it was intended that these lands were to be used for the resettlement of other Native Americans and freedmen. The lands were not intended for settlement by whites. Now, the government wanted to open these so-called "unassigned lands" for white settlement. Porter and his delegation agreed to remove the restrictions on land use in exchange for $2.25 million. The agreement was signed on January 31, 1889.

Pleasant Porter was elected Principal Chief on September 5, 1899. He and his delegation negotiated more concessions regarding rights of individual Creek members than had been allowed to many other tribes. But, many Creek opposed the allotment plan and break-up of communal land. In 1900, a leader of the full-blood faction, Chitto Harjo ("Crazy Snake"), declared a separate government. Porter appealed to the U. S. government for help putting down the revolt. A cavalry troop arrived and arrested the leaders in January 1901. Crazy Snake and his lieutenants pleaded guilty, were lectured by the judge, and sent home.

Porter was reelected as Principal Chief in 1903. The powers of the office had been greatly reduced by the Curtis Act, so its duties were largely ceremonial or clerical. Much time was consumed signing land allotment deeds. Porter and other prominent leaders became interested in the movement to create a state out of Indian Territory, to be governed by Native Americans. The movement proposed to call it the State of Sequoyah, after the Cherokee who created an alphabet.

== Porter and the Sequoyah Constitutional Convention ==
The Sequoyah Convention met in the Hinton Theater at Muskogee on August 21, 1905. The purposes were to draft a constitution for the proposed state, choose a name for the state, and name a capital city. Porter was elected permanent chairman of the convention. Other key officers elected by the delegates included Charles N. Haskell, vice chair and Alexander Posey, secretary. The delegates met again on the following day, then departed. They reconvened for a three-day meeting in September, at which the proposed constitution was overwhelmingly approved. At a third session on October 14, the delegates voted to authorize Porter and Posey to sign the document on behalf of all the delegates.

== Family life ==
After the Civil War, Porter restored the family plantation. He also went into business as a merchant and rancher. He opened a general store at Okmulgee that he sold in 1869. He moved to Wealaka, built a home and lived there for the rest of his life.

Pleasant Porter married Mary Ellen Keys in St. Louis, Missouri, on November 25, 1872. She was born in the Cherokee Nation on April 6, 1854, the daughter of Judge Riley Keys and his wife; he was chief justice of the courts of the Cherokee Nation for twenty-five years. The Porters had three children: William Adair, Pleasant and Annetta Mary. Mary Ellen died at Wealaka on January 15, 1886.

The widower Porter married Mattie Leonora Bertholf, a cousin of his first wife, on May 26, 1886. They had one daughter, Leonora. She died July 19, 1929.

== Death ==
Porter, accompanied by Judge John R. Thomas and M. L. Mott, Creek Nation attorney, boarded a train on September 2, 1907, to attend to legal business in Missouri. They had to stop over in Vinita, I. T. to change trains. Porter complained of feeling unwell, had a stroke sometime that night, lapsed into a coma and died on the morning of September 3, 1907. He is buried in the Pleasant Porter Cemetery in Bixby, Oklahoma.

== See also ==
- Sequoyah Constitutional Convention
