= Beggs Independent School District =

School district in Oklahoma

Location
- Beggs, Oklahoma United States

District information
- Type: Public

The Beggs Independent School District is a school district based in Beggs, Oklahoma, United States. It contains an elementary school, a middle school, and a high school. The district-wide mascot is the Golden Demons.

On March 6, 2026, an EF3 tornado caused damage to a school and various school buses.

== See also ==
- List of school districts in Oklahoma
