= Lake Sulphur Springs =

Lake in Texas

- Location within Texas
- Location: Hopkins County, Texas
- Coordinates: 33°10′36.8″N 95°37′56.1″W
- Type: reservoir
- River sources: White Oak Creek (Sulphur River tributary)
- Built: July 24, 1973
- Surface area: 1,340 acres (540 ha)
- Max. depth: 28 feet (8.5 m)

Lake Sulphur Springs is an artificial lake located in Sulphur Springs, Hopkins County, Texas. The lake is located directly north of the Sulphur Springs Municipal Airport.
