= Sulphur Springs Municipal Airport =

- IATA: SLR; ICAO: KSLR; FAA LID: SLR

Summary
- Airport type: Public
- Owner: City of Sulphur Springs
- Serves: Sulphur Springs, Texas
- Elevation AMSL: 489 ft / 149 m
- Coordinates: 33°09′35″N 095°37′16″W
- Website: www.SLR.aero

Map
- Location of airport in Texas

Runways
Direction	Length		Surface
Direction	ft	m	Surface
1/19	5,001	1,524	Concrete

Statistics (2009)
- Aircraft operations: 17,910
- Based aircraft: 74
- Source: Federal Aviation Administration

Sulphur Springs Municipal Airport (IATA: SLR, ICAO: KSLR, FAA LID: SLR) is a city-owned, public-use airport located two nautical miles (4 km) northwest of the central business district of Sulphur Springs, a city in Hopkins County, Texas, United States. It is included in the National Plan of Integrated Airport Systems for 2011–2015, which categorized it as a general aviation facility. The airport is situated on the shores of Lake Sulphur Springs.

It was named Texas Airport of the Year for 2003 by the Texas Department of Transportation Aviation Division.

The American Legend Aircraft Company is located at the airport.

== Facilities and aircraft ==
Sulphur Springs Municipal Airport covers an area of 197 acres (80 ha) at an elevation of 489 feet (149 m) above mean sea level. It has one runway designated 1/19 with a concrete surface measuring 5,001 by 75 feet (1,524 x 23 m).

For the 12-month period ending March 7, 2009, the airport had 17,910 aircraft operations, an average of 49 per day: 97% general aviation, 3% military, and <1% air taxi. At that time there were 74 aircraft based at this airport: 88% single-engine, 8% multi-engine, 1% jet, 1% helicopter, and 1% ultralight.

== See also ==
- List of airports in Texas
