= Wynema, a Child of the Forest =

1891 historical novel by Sophia Alice Callahan

Wynema, a Child of the Forest was a historical novel by American (Muscogee) author, Sophia Alice Callahan, published in 1891. It is the first novel by a Native American woman in the U.S.

== Plot ==
The novel follows Wynema, a young Muscogee girl, who, like Callahan, becomes educated in English and teaches at a mission school. She later marries the brother of her friend, a white teacher. She has a child with him, but after Wounded Knee, also adopts a Lakota infant girl.

== Major themes ==
She completed the novel and published it six months after the Massacre at Wounded Knee at the Pine Ridge Indian Reservation and the year following the Ghost Dance, major events in Native American history. Her novel offered "the first fictional re-creation of both the messianic religious movement that reached the Pine Ridge Reservation in the spring of 1890 and the infamous slaughter of Lakota men, women, and children that occurred on December 29 of that same year."

Callahan shows how strongly learning to read and write in English is related to assimilation, but she also shows her lead characters reading critically, applying judgment, and "scrutinizing contexts and subtexts."

While Callahan has her characters (often through the white characters) express some of the common ideas about allotment, the Ghost Dance and the massacre, "Old Masse Hadjo," an Indian, explicitly explains how the Ghost Dance religion is better for the Indians than Christianity. His comments "validate the Native religion and emphasizes the threat of white hostility, turning dominant rhetoric on its head and thereby extricating the Ghost Dance from the violence to follow."

== Publication history ==
In the late 20th century, Wynema, a Child of the Forest was rediscovered. It was reprinted in 1997.

== Literary significance ==
The timing of the publication of Callahan's novel in the spring of 1891 shows that she had to decide to incorporate the events of Wounded Knee into her novel, as they took place in December 1890. A. Lavonne Brown Ruoff says this section appears to be tacked on to the novel, which otherwise has a classic romantic structure that was resolved with the marriages of Wynema and her white teacher friend Genevieve.

Callahan used the novel to dramatize the issue of tribal allotments and breakup of communal lands, and dedicated it to the Native American population, calling for an end to injustices suffered by Indians. Her heroine "Wynema serves as both a reflection of Callahan's Christian ideals and a vehicle through which those ideals can be shown to fail."

== Reception ==
According to scholars Gretchen M. Bataille and Laurie Lisa, the novel is "thin, and sometimes highly improbable, plots are woven through with themes concerning the importance of Christianity and education in English, fraud in Indian administration, allotments, temperance, women's rights, the Ghost Dance movement, and atrocities committed upon the Sioux at Wounded Knee".

When Callahan addresses Wounded Knee, she repeats inaccuracies of the press. But she introduces a radical element by describing Lakota women before and after the battle, which most other accounts ignore. In a contrived ending, Chikena, an elder Lakota woman finds and saves three infants from the battlefield. In this section, the reader learns that Wynema speaks Lakota; she invites the older woman to live with her and adopts the infant girl. "Wynema's charge, named Miscona after her dead mother, becomes ... a "famous musician and wise woman" (Callahan 104), offering at least the possibility of an Indian-identified life." This is in contrast to the two Lakota boys, adopted by Wynema's white friends, who are given Anglo-European names and said to become a doctor and missionary as adults. Lisa Tatonetti says that Callahan wrote from her position as an acculturated Native American but she also sought to imagine the lives of the Plains Indians.

== Bibliography ==
- Bakken, Gordon Moris; Farrington, Brenda (June 26, 2003). Encyclopedia of Women in the American West. SAGE Publications. ISBN 978-1-4522-6526-1.
- Bataille, Gretchen M.; Lisa, Laurie (December 16, 2003). Native American Women: A Biographical Dictionary. Routledge. ISBN 978-1-135-95587-8.
