= Samuel Checote =

Muscogee political leader, military veteran and Methodist preacher

- Born: 1819; Alabama
- Died: 1884 (aged 64–65); Okmulgee, Creek Nation, Indian Territory
- Occupation: Preacher
- Known for: Principal Chief, Creek Nation

Samuel Checote (1819–1884) (Muscogee) was a political leader, military veteran, and a Methodist preacher in the Creek Nation, Indian Territory. He served two terms as the first principal chief of the tribe to be elected under their new constitution created after the American Civil War. He had to deal with continuing tensions among his people, as traditionalists opposed assimilation to European-American ways.

Checote fought with the Confederacy during the war; most Creek supported their cause. He served as a lieutenant colonel with a Creek mounted unit in Indian Territory. After the war he resumed preaching.

== Early life and education ==
Checote was born in 1819 to a Muscogee family in the Chattahoochee Valley, traditional Creek territory. It is in present-day eastern Alabama, near the Georgia state line. He started school at the Asbury Manual Labor School, established by Methodist missionaries near Fort Mitchell, Alabama. In 1829, he and his family were forced to move to Indian Territory (present-day Oklahoma) as part of Indian Removal. They settled near where Okmulgee developed.

Later, Checote attended an academy founded by John Harrell, a Methodist missionary. He encouraged Checote's studies and persuaded him to become a minister to the Creek (Muscogee).

== Preacher ==
Following removal, the Lower Creek Council, which had earlier been dominated by those who wanted to take up some European-American ways, passed laws in 1832 and 1844 forbidding any tribal member from preaching Christianity. Checote and several other Creek preachers fled for their safety; they remained outside the Creek Nation until they were able to appeal to Chief Roley McIntosh. He overrode the council and repealed the law.

In 1852, Checote joined the Indian Mission Conference of the Methodist Episcopal Church, South. The national church had split into North and South denominations because of disagreement over slavery. Some of the Creek and members of the other Civilized Tribes held enslaved African Americans; they had taken many to Indian Territory at the time of removal, and later purchased others.

Checote continued preaching until the American Civil War began. He and many other Creek supported the Confederacy, which had promised an all-Indian state if it was victorious. He enlisted in the Confederate Army on August 13, 1861, as captain of Company B of the First Regiment of Creek Mounted Volunteers. On August 19, 1861, he was commissioned as lieutenant colonel of his regiment. He and his regiment participated in several actions against Union forces, including the 1864 Battle of Cabin Creek and a skirmish at Pryor Creek.

After the end of the Civil War, Checote resumed his career as a Methodist preacher. He served as a circuit rider, traveling distances to serve other Creek in their territory. He was a presiding elder of the Indian Mission.

== Principal chief ==
In 1867 Checote was elected as principal chief of the Creek Nation; he was the first to serve under the new postwar Creek constitution. He was reelected to a second term in 1871.

Checote's skills as a political leader were tested by tribal tensions and rivalries, which increased over the next decade. Many of the Creek were traditionalists who continued to oppose assimilation into the white man's way of life. This group, initially led by Locha Harjo, opposed the new constitution.

They eventually formed a kind of rival government based in the town of Nuyaka. After the death of Harjo, the group turned to Isparhecher, a former Checote supporter and district judge, as their chief.

During this period, Checote remained affiliated with the Methodist Church. The Methodist Church, South, chose Checote as a delegate to the international 1882 Ecumenical Council in London, England. But he was unable to attend because of illness.

Troubles continued with rebel opposition within the Nation. In early 1883 Checote called on the Creek Lighthorse, the law enforcement unit, led by Pleasant Porter, to put down the rival movement. In February 1883, Porter's force defeated the Nuyaka rebels in a battle that came to be known as the "Peach Orchard War" or Green Peach War.

The Nuyaka men, accompanied by their families, moved to Anadarko, where they sought refuge among the Kiowa tribe. Isparhecher had gone to meet with some Cherokee, seeking their support. The Federal government intervened, arresting the fugitives and sending them to Fort Gibson. A U.S. Government commission came to meet with representatives of both Creek factions at Muskogee, seeking to resolve the dispute.

Checote resigned as Principal Chief in mid-1883 and called for a new election. It was a contest between Isparhecher and Joseph Perryman, a member of the Checote party. The election on September 3, 1883, was very close. While Isparhecher believed that he had won and briefly served as principal chief during December 1883, the Secretary of the Interior intervened. That department ruled that Perryman had won the vote count and was rightfully the principal chief.

The Perryman government named Isparhecher as its delegate in Washington, D. C. in 1884. It also compensated him for losses of his property and other expenses during the insurrection.

Checote died at his home in Okmulgee on September 3, 1884.
