= Slick, Oklahoma =

- Town
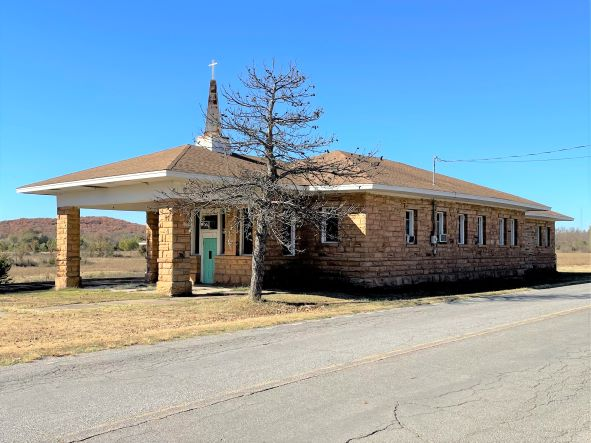
- Railroad depot at Slick, later a church and now the Town Hall

- Location within Creek County, and the state of Oklahoma
- Coordinates: 35°46′31″N 96°16′00″W
- Country: United States
- State: Oklahoma
- County: Creek

Area
  - Total: 7.85 sq mi (20.34 km^{2})
  - Land: 7.76 sq mi (20.09 km^{2})
  - Water: 0.097 sq mi (0.25 km^{2})
- Elevation: 702 ft (214 m)

Population (2020)
  - Total: 151
  - Density: 19.5/sq mi (7.52/km^{2})
- Time zone: UTC-6 (Central (CST))
  - Summer (DST): UTC-5 (CDT)
- ZIP code: 74071
- Area codes: 539/918
- FIPS code: 40-68000
- GNIS feature ID: 2413297

Slick is a town in Creek County, Oklahoma, United States. The population was 151 at the 2020 census, a 15.3% increase over the population in 2010.

== History ==
Slick began as an oil boom town in 1920, and was named for oilman Thomas B. Slick, who drilled a discovery well nearby. A railroad, the Oklahoma-Southwestern Railway, was completed into town the same year. By 1922, the town had an estimated population of 2500-3500. However, production of oil began to decline in the latter part of 1923, and the railroad was abandoned by 1930. So when the town appeared for the first time in the U.S. census in 1930, the population was only 422, a figure which declined until 1950 and has since fluctuated. All of its employed citizens commute to work in Bristow, Sapulpa, and Tulsa.

== Geography ==
Slick is on the Deep Fork River, and situated southeast of Bristow on SH-16.

Slick has a public park, located on the west side of SH-16, where Easter Egg Hunts and other events are held.

According to the United States Census Bureau, the town has a total area of 0.4 square miles (1.0 km^{2}), all land.

== Demographics ==
Historical population
Census	Pop.	Note	%±
1930	422		—
1940	300		−28.9%
1950	151		−49.7%
1960	151		0.0%
1970	171		13.2%
1980	187		9.4%
1990	124		−33.7%
2000	148		19.4%
2010	131		−11.5%
2020	151		15.3%
U.S. Decennial Census

=== 2020 census ===
As of the 2020 census, Slick had a population of 151. The median age was 48.5 years. 22.5% of residents were under the age of 18 and 16.6% of residents were 65 years of age or older. For every 100 females there were 98.7 males, and for every 100 females age 18 and over there were 98.3 males age 18 and over.

0.0% of residents lived in urban areas, while 100.0% lived in rural areas.

There were 69 households in Slick, of which 36.2% had children under the age of 18 living in them. Of all households, 43.5% were married-couple households, 15.9% were households with a male householder and no spouse or partner present, and 30.4% were households with a female householder and no spouse or partner present. About 20.3% of all households were made up of individuals and 7.2% had someone living alone who was 65 years of age or older.

There were 78 housing units, of which 11.5% were vacant. The homeowner vacancy rate was 0.0% and the rental vacancy rate was 0.0%.

Racial composition as of the 2020 census
Race	Number	Percent
White	109	72.2%
Black or African American	5	3.3%
American Indian and Alaska Native	15	9.9%
Asian	1	0.7%
Native Hawaiian and Other Pacific Islander	0	0.0%
Some other race	1	0.7%
Two or more races	20	13.2%
Hispanic or Latino (of any race)	2	1.3%

=== 2000 census ===
As of the census of 2000, there were 148 people, 52 households, and 35 families residing in the town. The population density was 335.2 inhabitants per square mile (129.4/km^{2}). There were 63 housing units at an average density of 142.7 per square mile (55.1/km^{2}). The racial makeup of the town was 79.73% White, 10.81% African American, 8.11% Native American, 0.68% from other races, and 0.68% from two or more races. Hispanic or Latino of any race were 0.68% of the population.

There were 52 households, out of which 34.6% had children under the age of 18 living with them, 59.6% were married couples living together, 5.8% had a female householder with no husband present, and 30.8% were non-families. 28.8% of all households were made up of individuals, and 13.5% had someone living alone who was 65 years of age or older. The average household size was 2.85 and the average family size was 3.58.

In the town, the population was spread out, with 29.7% under the age of 18, 10.8% from 18 to 24, 31.8% from 25 to 44, 18.2% from 45 to 64, and 9.5% who were 65 years of age or older. The median age was 34 years. For every 100 females, there were 114.5 males. For every 100 females age 18 and over, there were 96.2 males.

The median income for a household in the town was $35,000, and the median income for a family was $37,500. Males had a median income of $32,083 versus $19,000 for females. The per capita income for the town was $13,554. There were 4.2% of families and 7.3% of the population living below the poverty line, including no under eighteens and 11.8% of those over 64.

== Education ==
It is in the Bristow Public Schools school district.

== See also ==
- Ghost Towns In Oklahoma
- Map of Ghost Towns In Oklahoma
