= Isparhecher =

Muscogee political leader (1829–1902)

- Espahehcv (Creek)
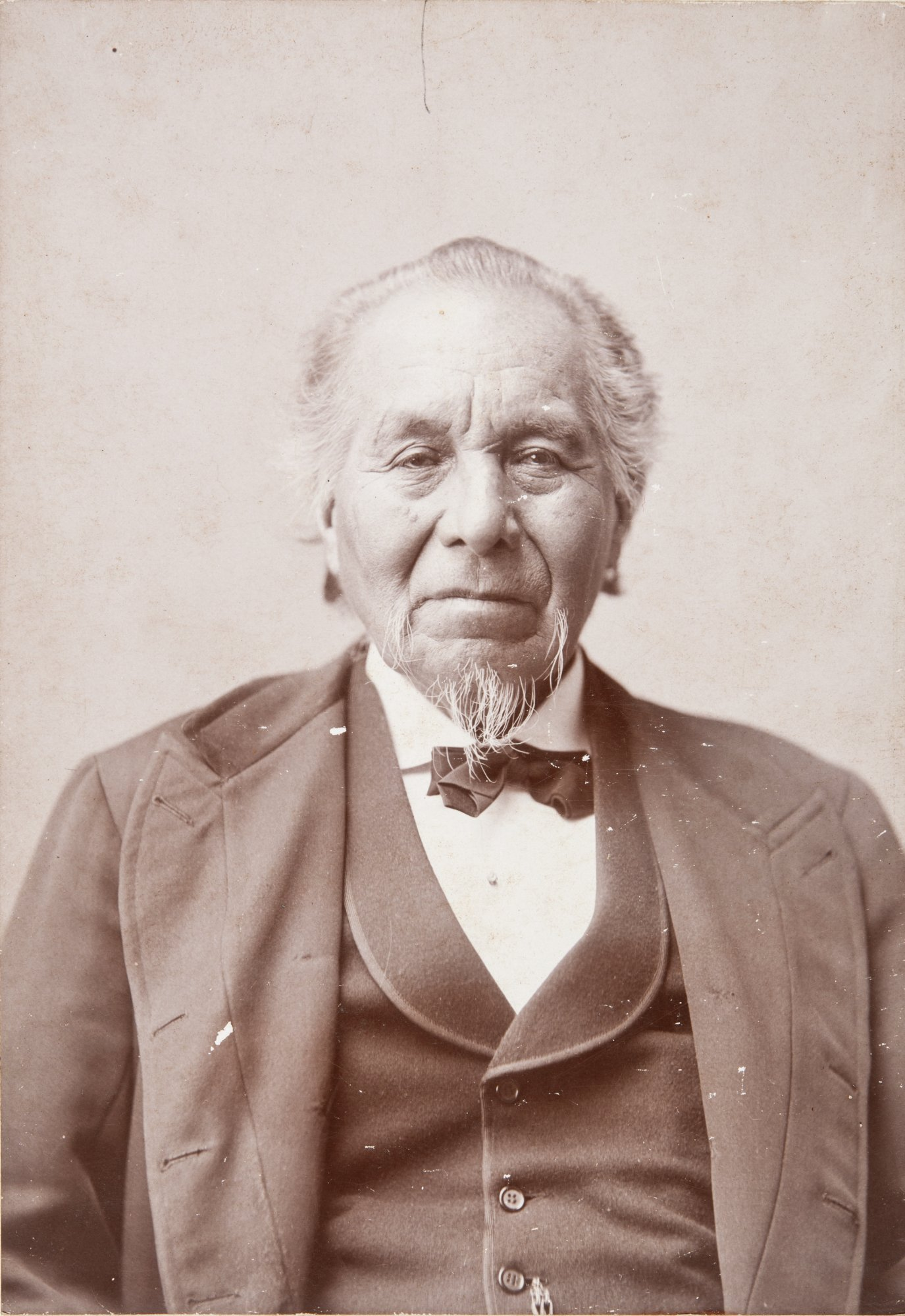
- Isparhecher, c. 1898
- Born: c. 1829; Alabama, U.S.
- Died: December 22, 1902; Creek Nation, U.S.
- Other names: Is-pa-he-che, Spa-he-cha, Isparhecker
- Occupations: farmer, political activist

Isparhecher (Creek: Espahehcv; c. 1829 – 22 December 1902) was a political leader of the opposition in the Creek Nation (now known by their autonym Muscogee) in the post-Civil War era. He led a group that supported traditional ways and was opposed to the assimilation encouraged by Chief Samuel Checote and others.

Born in Alabama in 1829 to full-blood Creek parents, Isparhecher and his family belonged to the Lower Creek (a.k.a., McIntosh faction), who wanted to keep traditional ways. They were among the majority of Creek who removed to Indian Territory in the early 1830s. They settled on a farm at Cussetah town, about 7 miles (11 km) southeast of the present city of Okmulgee, Oklahoma

After most of the Creek Nation allied with the Confederacy at the outbreak of the American Civil War, Isparhecher joined the Confederate army in 1861. During the war, he switched his allegiance in 1863 to the Union and fought with their army.

In the postwar years, Isparhecher became active in Creek politics. After the Nation was forced to make a new peace treaty with the United States, he initially supported the recognized Creek government. The council had drafted a new constitution, under which Samuel Checote was elected as principal chief. But Isparhecher became increasingly aligned with the opposition, which consisted mostly of full-blood Creek who wanted to preserve traditional ways rather than assimilate to European–American culture. They formed a rival Creek government based in the town of Nuyaka. It was led first by Locha Harjo, then by Isparhecher. In 1883 Checote mustered the Creek Lighthorse, led by Pleasant Porter, to confront and defeat the Nuyaka group. Isparhecher remained politically active until his death.

== Early life ==
Isparhecher was born in Alabama in 1829 to full-blood Creek parents, Yar-de-ka Tus-tan-nug-ga and his wife Ke-char-te. The family belonged to the Lower Creek (a.k.a., McIntosh faction), which wanted to keep to traditional ways. They had had less contact with European Americans than the Upper Creek. Both groups were forced to cede their land and remove to Indian Territory in the early 1830s. Isparhecher's family settled on a farm at Cussetah town, about 7 miles (11 km) southeast of what developed as Okmulgee, Oklahoma. His parents were said to have died early. Isparhecher became a farmer and stockman. He is listed on the Dawes Rolls as "Creek by Blood" with a "Full" blood quantum.

== Marriage and family ==
Sometime prior to the Civil War, Isparhecher married a woman named Polikissut. They had a son named Washington. His first wife may have died, as he was recorded as marrying Lucy Barnett. They had four children together.

His third wife was Alma Harrover, whom he met and married in Washington, D.C., on June 4, 1884. He was serving as the Creek delegate to Congress, under the Chief Joseph Perryman administration. They divorced November 28, 1891.

His last wife was Cindoche Sixkiller, a woman 36 years younger than he. They married on March 26, 1896, at the Creek Nation. She survived him, and died June 14, 1931.

== Civil War service ==
The Creek Nation leadership allied with the Confederacy, which had promised an Indian-controlled state if they were victorious.

Isparhecher enlisted for a one-year term in the Confederate Army on August 17, 1861, becoming 4th Sergeant in Company K of the 1st Regiment of Creek Mounted Volunteers. D. N. McIntosh was the company commander and the unit was attached to a brigade led by Col. D. H. Cooper. Muster rolls indicate he was absent from August 19, 1861, until August 17, 1862. After that date, he appeared on every muster roll until December 1, 1862. He did not report again after that.

After the Union army began to wrest control of Indian Territory from the Confederates in 1863, many Indians changed their alliance. Isparhecher was one of these. According to an 1896 article in the New York Times, Isparhecher had become disillusioned by the way the Confederates' white officers treated the Native American soldiers. He noticed that the Union side was more welcoming and shifted his allegiance.

Isparhecher went to Fort Gibson, then controlled by the Union Army, where he volunteered to join Company K in the 1st Regiment of Indian Home Guards, Kansas Infantry, in the Union Army. He missed only one muster roll until he was honorably discharged at Fort Gibson on May 31, 1865. He was in combat at the battle on Barren Fork and was promoted to Sergeant on March 12, 1864.

== Post-war activities and Green Peach War ==
Isparhecher returned to the Creek nation to resume civilian life as a farmer. He also became active in Creek political life. He became a member of the Creek House of Warriors in 1867. In October 1867, he was a member of the Creek National Council that created a new constitution as the framework for a new tribal government.

He served as the Muscogee District judge from 1872 to 1874. When his judicial appointment expired, he moved from Cussetah to a farm near the present town of Beggs, Oklahoma. He was named trustee of the Salt Creek School in 1874–75. In 1877, he was appointed as principal judge of the Okmulgee District.

A group of full-blood Creeks led by Lochar Harjo had settled in the vicinity of Nuyaka, a few miles west of Okmulgee. Most of these had been loyal to the Union side in the Civil War and wanted to continue their traditional way of life. They opposed efforts to assimilate to European-American culture.

They rejected the authority of the new Creek government and the constitution of 1867. As time passed, the group became more assertive, refusing to send representatives to the national government, and refusing to obey laws passed by it.

They began to form their own government in Nuyaka. After moving to the Beggs area, Isparhecher began to cultivate the political support of the Nuyaka Creek faction. Even while he was a judge in Okmulgee, he began to argue that the constitution was unsuited to Creek traditional ways and therefore was not binding. Supporters of elected principal chief Samuel Checote impeached Isparhecher and removed him from judicial office. But the Nuyaka Creek considered Isparhecher as the successor to the late Lochar Harjo, who had emerged as their chief.

Isparhecher began traveling throughout the Creek Nation to rally support from other full-blood Creek for the opposition movement. He also sought support from Seminole and Cherokee. In 1882, after hearing that a band of Cherokee under Sleeping Rabbit might come to support the Nuyaka Creek, Chief Checote mustered militia against the movement. He ordered the Creek Lighthorse under William Robison and Thomas Adams to stop the Nuyaka campaign. Checote's troops captured one Nuyaka horseman, but his companions rescued him and killed two of Checote's militia.

Checote summoned Pleasant Porter back from Washington, D.C., where he was serving as a delegate to Congress. He appointed him to lead the Lighthorse. In February 1883, Porter led forces that defeated the Nuyaka in an armed skirmish in a peach orchard. The action was thereafter known as the "Peach Orchard War" or Green Peach War (Pvkanv Lokceko Enhorre). Porter's men pursued the Nuyaka forces as they fled west through the Sac and Fox territory. Then, Porter's troops returned to Okmulgee.

The Nuyaka men, accompanied by their families, moved to Anadarko, where they sought refuge among the Kiowa tribe. Isparhecher had gone to meet with some Cherokee, seeking their support. The Federal government intervened, arresting the fugitives and taking them for detention at Fort Gibson. A U.S. government commission came to meet with representatives of both Creek factions at Muskogee, seeking to resolve the dispute.

Checote resigned as Principal Chief and called for a new election to choose his replacement. The election developed into a contest between Isparhecher and Joseph Perryman, a member of the Checote party. The election on September 3, 1883, was very close.

Isparhecher believe that he had won and served as principal chief briefly during December 1883. However, the Secretary of the Interior intervened, ruling that Perryman had won the vote count and was rightfully the principal chief.

The next year, the Perryman government appointed Isparhecher as its delegate in Washington, D.C. It also compensated him for losses of his property and other expenses during the insurrection.

== Legacy and honors ==
=== Isparhecher House and Grave ===
Chief Isparhecher later returned to the Creek Nation, where he died at home on December 22, 1902. He was buried in the Isparhecher family cemetery in Okmulgee County, Oklahoma. The Isparhecher House and Grave are listed on the National Register of Historic Places of sites in Okmulgee County. The site is privately owned and not open for visitors. It is located about 4 miles west of the town of Beggs, off State Highway 16.
