= Beggs, Oklahoma =

- City
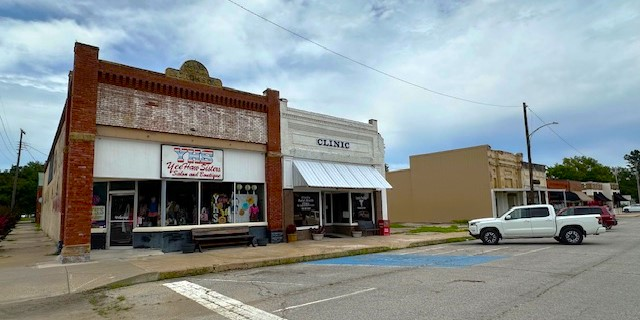
- Downtown Beggs in July 2025

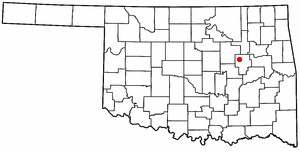
- Location of Beggs, Oklahoma
- Coordinates: 35°45′20″N 96°01′18″W
- Country: United States
- State: Oklahoma
- County: Okmulgee
- Established: 1902

Government
  - Type: Mayor-Council
  - Mayor: Roger Merrill (L)

Area
  - Total: 4.20 sq mi (10.88 km^{2})
  - Land: 4.20 sq mi (10.87 km^{2})
  - Water: 0.0039 sq mi (0.01 km^{2})
- Elevation: 866 ft (264 m)

Population (2020)
  - Total: 1,179
  - Density: 281.0/sq mi (108.49/km^{2})
- Time zone: UTC-6 (Central (CST))
  - Summer (DST): UTC-5 (CDT)
- ZIP code: 74421
- Area codes: 539/918
- FIPS code: 40-05000
- GNIS feature ID: 2409813
- Website: https://beggs.municipalimpact.com

Beggs is a city in Okmulgee County, Oklahoma, United States. The population was 1,179 as of the 2020 census. Beggs was named for Charles Hoffman Beggs (1865–1942), vice president of the St. Louis-San Francisco (Frisco) Railway.

== History ==
Starting as a Frisco railroad stop in 1899, Beggs officially became a town on September 15, 1900, when its post office opened. It originally was a center for hog, cattle, and horse ranches in the area. In 1918, oil was discovered just to the west, and Beggs became an oil boomtown until circa 1926. After that, corn, cotton, pecans, and stock raising became important local industries, but Beggs went into a gradual decline, going from an official population of 2,327 in 1920 to 1,531 in 1930 and 1,107 in 1970. The population has since shown some upward fluctuation, settling at 1,179 as of the 2020 Census.

Isparhecher House and Grave is among the National Register of Historic Places listings in Okmulgee County, Oklahoma, and is located approximately four miles west of town off State Highway 16 on private land.

Roger Merrill became Oklahoma's first Libertarian municipal leader when he was elected in 2025.

On March 6, 2026, an EF3 tornado impacted the western and northern part of the city, killing two people.

== Geography ==
Beggs is located approximately 30 miles south of downtown Tulsa and four miles west of U.S. Route 75, a major national north–south artery. U.S. Route 75 Alternate, the only such bannered route stemming from U.S. Route 75, is largely along the former alignment of the old Highway 75 prior to 1959, and travels from U.S. 75 west to Beggs, along SH-16, before turning north along said former alignment and continuing to Sapulpa. The former alignment running directly south from Beggs to Okmulgee is known as Old Highway 75. The major east–west route through Beggs is Oklahoma State Highway 16.

According to the United States Census Bureau, the city has a total area of 4.3 square miles (11 km^{2}), all land.

== Demographics ==
Historical population
Census	Pop.	Note	%±
1910	855		—
1920	2,327		172.2%
1930	1,531		−34.2%
1940	1,283		−16.2%
1950	1,214		−5.4%
1960	1,114		−8.2%
1970	1,107		−0.6%
1980	1,428		29.0%
1990	1,150		−19.5%
2000	1,364		18.6%
2010	1,321		−3.2%
2020	1,179		−10.7%
U.S. Decennial Census

=== 2020 census ===
As of the 2020 census, Beggs had a population of 1,179 and a median age of 39.0 years. 24.9% of residents were under the age of 18 and 17.5% were 65 years of age or older. For every 100 females there were 88.6 males, and for every 100 females age 18 and over there were 86.3 males age 18 and over.

Less than 0.1% of residents lived in urban areas, while 100.0% lived in rural areas.

There were 445 households in Beggs, of which 35.5% had children under the age of 18 living in them. Of all households, 39.1% were married-couple households, 19.1% were households with a male householder and no spouse or partner present, and 35.3% were households with a female householder and no spouse or partner present. About 30.4% of all households were made up of individuals and 15.5% had someone living alone who was 65 years of age or older.

There were 532 housing units, of which 16.4% were vacant. Among occupied housing units, 62.7% were owner-occupied and 37.3% were renter-occupied. The homeowner vacancy rate was 3.8% and the rental vacancy rate was 7.3%.

Racial composition as of the 2020 census
Race	Percent
White	51.6%
Black or African American	14.2%
American Indian and Alaska Native	13.9%
Asian	0.3%
Native Hawaiian and Other Pacific Islander	<0.1%
Some other race	1.2%
Two or more races	18.7%
Hispanic or Latino (of any race)	4.7%

=== 2000 census ===
As of the 2000 census, there were 1,364 people, 538 households, and 363 families residing in the city. The population density was 320.3 inhabitants per square mile (123.7/km^{2}). There were 608 housing units at an average density of 142.8 per square mile (55.1/km^{2}). The racial makeup of the city was 59.53% White, 21.70% African American, 9.75% Native American, 0.15% from other races, and 8.87% from two or more races. Hispanic or Latino of any race were 1.25% of the population.

There were 538 households, out of which 33.5% had children under the age of 18 living with them, 47.2% were married couples living together, 17.1% had a female householder with no husband present, and 32.5% were non-families. 30.7% of all households were made up of individuals, and 15.2% had someone living alone who was 65 years of age or older. The average household size was 2.51 and the average family size was 3.13.

In the city, the population was spread out, with 28.8% under the age of 18, 9.3% from 18 to 24, 26.5% from 25 to 44, 22.1% from 45 to 64, and 13.3% who were 65 years of age or older. The median age was 35 years. For every 100 females, there were 89.4 males. For every 100 females age 18 and over, there were 82.5 males.

The median income for a household in the city was $25,063, and the median income for a family was $31,250. Males had a median income of $26,150 versus $22,143 for females. The per capita income for the city was $12,191. About 16.9% of families and 18.4% of the population were below the poverty line, including 20.1% of those under age 18 and 29.3% of those age 65 or over.

== Recreation and infrastructure ==
Recreational opportunities include Old Beggs Lake, southeast of the town center, and the larger New Beggs Lake, almost directly east of the town center.

A city playground on Main Street was revitalized as Legacy Park in the 2019–2020 timeframe, complete with playground equipment, a pavilion, and picnic tables.

Beggs Fairgrounds and Round-Up Club Arena is a fairgrounds and rodeo arena available for special events.

Beggs has at least seven churches. (Note: Churches include: Crossroads Baptist Church at 6962 Happy Camp Rd; First Baptist Church South at 8150 Highway 16; First United Methodist Church at 506 N Broadway; Beggs First Assembly of God at the corner of 400 East Main at Cherokee street; First Apostolic Church at 302 West 3rd Street; Church of Christ at Fifth & Osage; and, Handy Chapel A.M.E. Church at E 1st St & S Broadway St.)

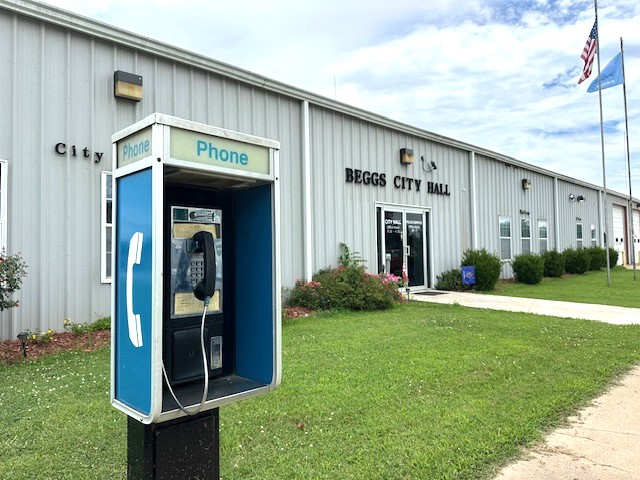
Nickel public pay phone outside Beggs City Hall, July 2025

== Notable people ==
- Lloyd Edgar Acree, posthumous recipient of the Navy Cross
- Suzan Shown Harjo, advocate for Native Americans
- Joe Martel III, first known amputee to play football in Oklahoma
- Dan Rowan, actor who portrayed the straight man on Rowan & Martin's Laugh-In
- Rodney Tate, NFL running back for the Cincinnati Bengals (1982–83) and Atlanta Falcons (1984)
- Alvin "Pooh" Williamson, former college basketball player and assistant coach

== In popular culture ==
Beggs attracted national attention in the late 1970s when public pay phones offering calls for only five cents had long since been phased out across the country, but Beggs still had them. In the 21st century, pay phones of any cost began to be phased out across the country by AT&T in 2007 and Verizon in 2011. But as of mid-2022, Beggs still has nickel public pay phones, maintained by the Beggs Telephone Company.

Beggs features prominently in The Great War: American Front, the second volume of the Southern Victory alternate history novels by author Harry Turtledove.

Beggs was one of the filming sites for principal photography on Season One of the FX comedy series Reservation Dogs from filmmaker Sterlin Harjo, which concerns four Native American teens in rural Oklahoma.
