= National Register of Historic Places listings in Okmulgee County, Oklahoma =

Location of Okmulgee County in Oklahoma

This is a list of the National Register of Historic Places listings in Okmulgee County, Oklahoma.

This is intended to be a complete list of the properties and districts on the National Register of Historic Places in Okmulgee County, Oklahoma, United States. The locations of National Register properties and districts for which the latitude and longitude coordinates are included below, may be seen in a map.

There are 23 properties and districts listed on the National Register in the county, including 1 National Historic Landmark.

This National Park Service list is complete through NPS recent listings posted June 19, 2026.

== Current listings ==
	Name on the Register	Image	Date listed	Location	City or town	Description
1	Creek National Capitol	Creek National Capitol	October 15, 1966 (#66000632)	6th St. and Grand Ave. 35°37′21″N 95°58′18″W	Okmulgee	
2	Eastside Baptist Church	Eastside Baptist Church	November 23, 1984 (#84000306)	219 N. Osage Ave. 35°37′33″N 95°57′30″W	Okmulgee	
3	First Baptist Central Church	First Baptist Central Church	November 23, 1984 (#84000307)	521 N. Central Ave. 35°37′39″N 95°58′11″W	Okmulgee	
4	First Presbyterian Church	First Presbyterian Church	January 20, 2026 (#100012564)	412 West Division Street; 35°26′31″N 95°59′11″W	Henryetta	
5	Grayson Jail	Grayson Jail	January 25, 2024 (#100009891)	approx. 200 feet (61 m) west, intersection of Perkins St. and Finley St. 35°30′12″N 95°52′25″W	Grayson	
6	Harmon Athletic Field	Harmon Athletic Field	January 25, 1999 (#98001588)	North of the junction of 12th St. and Creek Ave. 35°37′05″N 95°57′51″W	Okmulgee	
7	Haygood-Shepherd American Legion Post 103	Haygood-Shepherd American Legion Post 103	November 21, 2025 (#100012339)	N800 North Wilson Avenue; 35°37′48″N 95°57′10″W	Okmulgee	
8	Hugh Henry House	Hugh Henry House	August 18, 1983 (#83002110)	N. 3rd St. 35°27′02″N 95°59′00″W	Henryetta	
9	Isparhecher House and Grave		July 12, 1976 (#76001573)	About 4 miles west of Beggs off State Highway 16; 35°44′15″N 96°07′50″W	Beggs	
10	Kennedy Mansion	Kennedy Mansion	December 10, 2014 (#14001032)	502 S. Okmulgee Ave. 35°37′07″N 95°58′31″W	Okmulgee	
11	Lake Okmulgee Dam Spillway Cascade	Lake Okmulgee Dam Spillway Cascade	January 25, 1999 (#98001591)	State Highway 56, 10 miles west of U.S. Route 62; 35°37′19″N 96°03′32″W	Okmulgee	See mention Okmulgee Park
12	Nichols Park	Nichols Park	December 6, 2006 (#06001115)	1.9 miles south of the junction of Lake Rd. and Main St. 35°24′23″N 95°58′35″W	Henryetta	
13	Nuyaka Mission	Nuyaka Mission	April 13, 1972 (#72001075)	9 miles west of Okmulgee; 35°38′59″N 96°09′46″W	Okmulgee	
14	Okmulgee Armory	Okmulgee Armory	January 25, 1999 (#98001589)	Junction of 2nd and Alabama Sts. 35°37′37″N 95°58′35″W	Okmulgee	
15	Okmulgee Colored Hospital	Okmulgee Colored Hospital	June 22, 1984 (#84003387)	320 N. Wood Dr. 35°38′03″N 95°57′39″W	Okmulgee	
16	Okmulgee Country Club and Golf Course	Okmulgee Country Club and Golf Course	March 15, 2018 (#100002219)	1400 S. Mission Ln. 35°36′38″N 95°56′39″W	Okmulgee	See also Okmulgee, Oklahoma#Historic buildings
17	Okmulgee County Courthouse	Okmulgee County Courthouse	August 23, 1984 (#84003390)	300 W. 7th St. 35°37′20″N 95°58′27″W	Okmulgee	
18	Okmulgee Downtown Historic District	Okmulgee Downtown Historic District	December 17, 1992 (#92001693)	Roughly bounded by 4th St., Frisco Ave., 8th St., and Okmulgee Ave. 35°37′22″N 95°58′12″W	Okmulgee	
19	Okmulgee Public Library	Okmulgee Public Library	July 28, 1983 (#83002111)	218 S. Okmulgee Ave. 35°37′17″N 95°58′31″W	Okmulgee	
20	Okmulgee Stock Pavilion	Okmulgee Stock Pavilion	January 25, 1999 (#98001590)	Junction of Lagonda and Okmulgee Sts. 35°38′14″N 95°58′29″W	Okmulgee	
21	St. Anthony's Catholic Church	St. Anthony's Catholic Church	July 14, 1983 (#83002112)	515 S. Morton St. 35°37′06″N 95°58′20″W	Okmulgee	
22	Severs Block	Severs Block	March 22, 1991 (#91000311)	101 E. 6th St. 35°37′24″N 95°58′16″W	Okmulgee	
23	Wilson School		January 28, 1981 (#81000465)	Northwest of Henryetta; 35°30′28″N 96°02′06″W	Henryetta	Demolished

== See also ==
- List of National Historic Landmarks in Oklahoma
- National Register of Historic Places listings in Oklahoma
