= Okmulgee County, Oklahoma =

County in Oklahoma, United States

- County
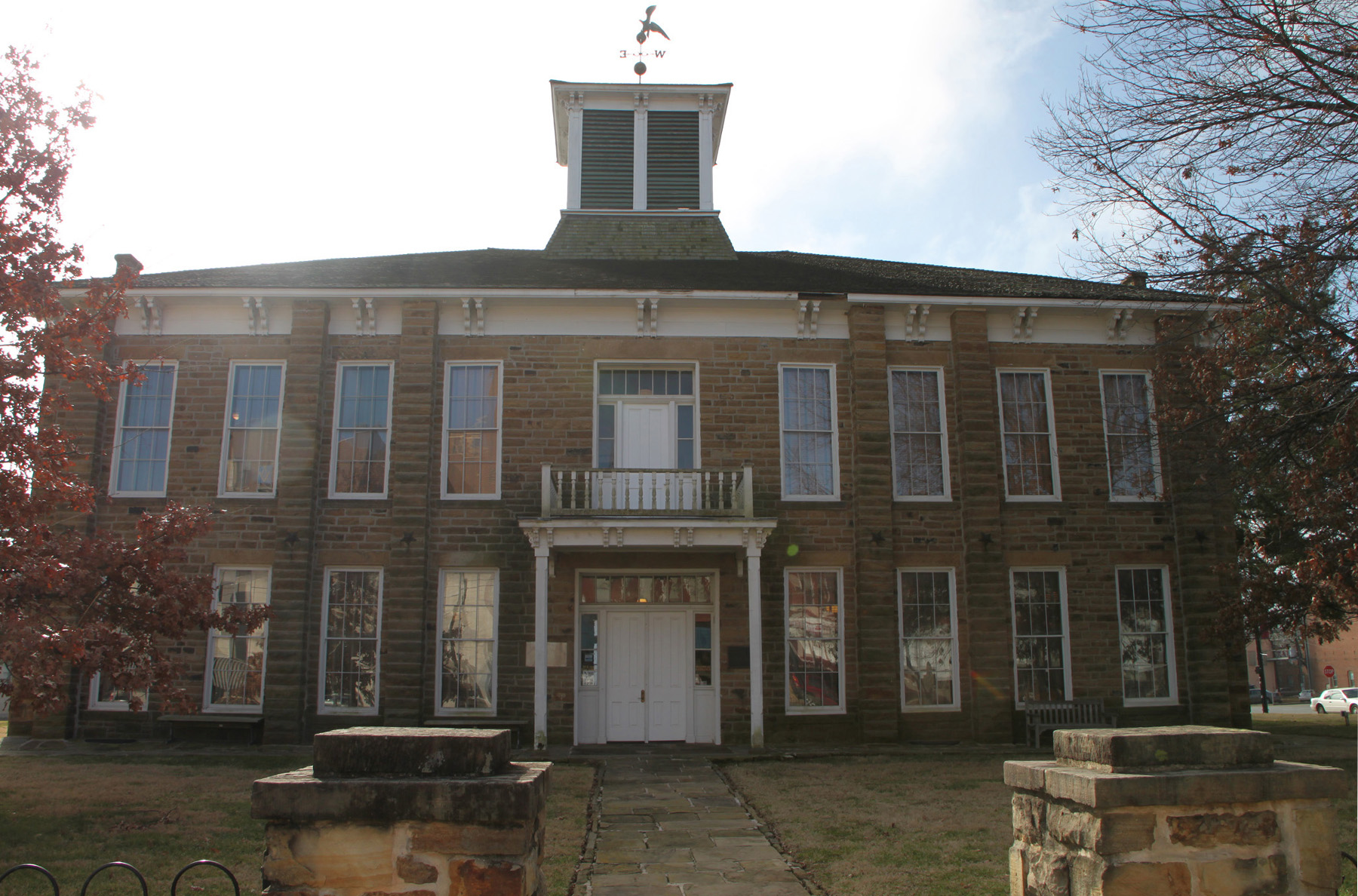
- Muscogee (Creek) Council House in downtown Okmulgee.

- Location within the U.S. state of Oklahoma
- Coordinates: 35°38′N 95°58′W
- Country: United States
- State: Oklahoma
- Founded: 1907
- Seat: Okmulgee
- Largest city: Okmulgee

Area
  - Total: 702 sq mi (1,820 km^{2})
  - Land: 697 sq mi (1,810 km^{2})
  - Water: 5.0 sq mi (13 km^{2}) 0.7%

Population (2020)
  - Total: 36,706
  - Estimate (2025): 37,241 ▲
  - Density: 52.7/sq mi (20.3/km^{2})
- Congressional district: 2nd

Okmulgee County is a county in the U.S. state of Oklahoma. As of the 2020 census, the population was 36,706. The county seat is Okmulgee. Located within the Muscogee Nation Reservation, the county was created at statehood in 1907. The name Okmulgee is derived from the Hitchita (Lower Creek) word okimulgi, meaning "boiling waters".

Okmulgee County is included in the Tulsa, OK metropolitan statistical area.

== History ==
The Creek Nation was removed into this part of Indian Territory along the Trail of Tears after signing treaties exchanging their land in Georgia and Alabama in 1826 and 1832. The actual move occurred over the period from 1827 to 1836. The Creek Nation government, led by chief Samuel Checote, revised its constitution in 1867 and designated Okmulgee as its capital in 1868. The U.S. Post Office opened in Okmulgee on April 29, 1869. The Creek Nation built its capitol, a log building, in 1869. The building was rebuilt of stone in 1878.

Okmulgee County was formed on July 16, 1907, from Muskogee land, with a population of 14,362. County government offices were located in the Creek Council House until 1916, when the present Okmulgee County Courthouse was built. The former council building was then repurposed. The county's population was 21,115 in 1910 and increased to a high of 56,558 by 1930.

Railroads came to the area in 1900, when the St. Louis, Oklahoma and Southern Railway (later the St. Louis and San Francisco Railway or Frisco) built a line from Sapulpa, Oklahoma via Okmulgee to a place near the Red River. The Shawnee, Oklahoma and Missouri Coal and Railway (later also acquired by the Frisco) built a line from Muskogee to Okmulgee in 1902–03. It was abandoned in 1973. The Missouri, Oklahoma and Gulf Railway (purchased by the Kansas, Oklahoma and Gulf Railway in 1919) ran through Dewar, Oklahoma beginning in 1909, and the Okmulgee Northern Railway operated between Okmulgee and Deep Fork from 1916 to 1964.

In 1918, the boundary between Okmulgee County and McIntosh County was realigned, moving the towns of Grayson and Hoffman from McIntosh into Okmulgee County.

The Creek Council House still stands today. While ownership of the building changed over the years, the City of Okmulgee in November 2010 sold the building back to the tribe for $3.2 million. The building currently houses the Creek Council House Museum, with artifacts and exhibits about the history of the Muscogee tribe and the arts and crafts of other Native American tribes.

== Geography ==
According to the U.S. Census Bureau, the county has a total area of 702 square miles (1,820 km^{2}), of which 697 square miles (1,810 km^{2}) is land and 5.0 square miles (13 km^{2}) (0.7%) is water. Lake Henryetta, Okmulgee Lake, Nichols Lake, most of Dripping Springs Lake, and the tip of Oklahoma's largest lake, Lake Eufaula, lie within the county. The Deep Fork of the North Canadian River is the principal waterway in the county. The eastern part of the county is within the Eastern Lowlands physiographic region and the western part is in the Osage Plains. Okmulgee Park and Dripping Springs Park lie west and southwest of the city of Okmulgee. Deep Fork National Wildlife Refuge lies within the southern part of the county. The area known as the High Spring Mountains is in the eastern part of the county south of Eram, and extending further south into McIntosh County in the Hitchita vicinity.

=== Adjacent counties ===
- Tulsa County (north)
- Wagoner County (northeast)
- Muskogee County (east)
- McIntosh County (southeast)
- Okfuskee County (southwest)
- Creek County (northwest)

== Demographics ==
Historical population
Census	Pop.	Note	%±
1910	21,115		—
1920	55,072		160.8%
1930	56,558		2.7%
1940	50,101		−11.4%
1950	44,561		−11.1%
1960	36,945		−17.1%
1970	35,358		−4.3%
1980	39,169		10.8%
1990	36,490		−6.8%
2000	39,685		8.8%
2010	40,069		1.0%
2020	36,706		−8.4%
2025 (est.)	37,241	▲	1.5%
U.S. Decennial Census; 1790-1960 1900-1990; 1990-2000 2010

=== 2020 census ===
As of the 2020 census, the county had a population of 36,706. Of the residents, 23.1% were under the age of 18 and 19.5% were 65 years of age or older; the median age was 40.9 years. For every 100 females there were 98.8 males, and for every 100 females age 18 and over there were 95.8 males.

The racial makeup of the county was 60.2% White, 7.5% Black or African American, 16.7% American Indian and Alaska Native, 0.4% Asian, 1.7% from some other race, and 13.4% from two or more races. Hispanic or Latino residents of any race comprised 4.7% of the population.

There were 14,134 households in the county, of which 29.9% had children under the age of 18 living with them and 29.4% had a female householder with no spouse or partner present. About 29.3% of all households were made up of individuals and 14.5% had someone living alone who was 65 years of age or older.

There were 16,624 housing units, of which 15.0% were vacant. Among occupied housing units, 70.2% were owner-occupied and 29.8% were renter-occupied. The homeowner vacancy rate was 2.5% and the rental vacancy rate was 12.6%.

=== 2000 census ===
As of the 2000 census, there were 39,685 people, 15,300 households, and 10,694 families residing in the county. The population density was 22/km^{2} (57/mi^{2}). There were 17,316 housing units at an average density of 10/km^{2} (26/mi^{2}). The racial makeup of the county was 69.73% White, 10.20% Black or African American, 12.85% Native American, 0.19% Asian, 0.02% Pacific Islander, 0.61% from other races, and 6.40% from two or more races. 1.95% of the population were Hispanic or Latino of any race.

There were 15,300 households, out of which 32.00% had children under the age of 18 living with them, 52.80% were married couples living together, 13.10% had a female householder with no husband present, and 30.10% were non-families. 27.10% of all households were made up of individuals, and 12.60% had someone living alone who was 65 years of age or older. The average household size was 2.53 and the average family size was 3.06.

In the county, the population was spread out, with 26.90% under the age of 18, 9.50% from 18 to 24, 25.30% from 25 to 44, 23.30% from 45 to 64, and 15.10% who were 65 years of age or older. The median age was 37 years. For every 100 females, there were 95.20 males. For every 100 females age 18 and over, there were 90.80 males.

The median income for a household in the county was $27,652, and the median income for a family was $33,987. Males had a median income of $29,935 versus $20,861 for females. The per capita income for the county was $14,065. About 14.90% of families and 18.90% of the population were below the poverty line, including 24.90% of those under age 18 and 15.50% of those age 65 or over.

== Government ==
Okmulgee County government has three commissioners, one for each of the three Districts. County services, including the District Court, Assessor, County Clerk, Jail, and Sheriff's office, are all located between 6th and 8th St, and Alabama and Seminole Avenues, in the City of Okmulgee.

== Politics ==
Despite a wide Democratic registration advantage as recently as the late 2010s, the county—like every Oklahoma county since 2000—has favored the Republican candidate for president in every election since 2000, with the Republican margin of victory increasing with every election.

Voter Registration and Party Enrollment as of June 30, 2023
Party	Number of Voters	Percentage
Democratic	7,282	35.20%
Republican	9,870	47.69%
Others	3,542	17.12%
Total	20,694	100%

United States presidential election results for Okmulgee County, Oklahoma
Year	Republican		Democratic		Third party(ies)	
Year	No.	%	No.	%	No.	%
1908	1,400	50.00%	1,103	39.39%	297	10.61%
1912	1,140	38.68%	1,243	42.18%	564	19.14%
1916	1,860	36.91%	2,406	47.75%	773	15.34%
1920	5,367	51.33%	4,495	42.99%	593	5.67%
1924	6,015	46.85%	5,927	46.17%	896	6.98%
1928	9,149	60.77%	5,834	38.75%	73	0.48%
1932	4,762	29.67%	11,287	70.33%	0	0.00%
1936	4,975	29.11%	12,061	70.56%	57	0.33%
1940	6,696	37.63%	11,016	61.90%	84	0.47%
1944	5,430	35.74%	9,737	64.09%	25	0.16%
1948	4,368	29.44%	10,467	70.56%	0	0.00%
1952	6,717	39.91%	10,115	60.09%	0	0.00%
1956	6,703	46.78%	7,626	53.22%	0	0.00%
1960	7,107	49.46%	7,262	50.54%	0	0.00%
1964	4,704	31.57%	10,195	68.43%	0	0.00%
1968	4,709	34.81%	6,089	45.02%	2,728	20.17%
1972	8,706	63.82%	4,494	32.94%	442	3.24%
1976	5,333	38.19%	8,499	60.87%	131	0.94%
1980	6,652	46.57%	7,236	50.65%	397	2.78%
1984	8,704	53.76%	7,380	45.59%	105	0.65%
1988	5,674	40.52%	8,262	59.00%	68	0.49%
1992	4,586	29.74%	7,767	50.37%	3,068	19.89%
1996	4,246	31.84%	7,555	56.65%	1,536	11.52%
2000	5,797	43.99%	7,186	54.53%	195	1.48%
2004	8,363	53.17%	7,367	46.83%	0	0.00%
2008	8,727	58.50%	6,191	41.50%	0	0.00%
2012	7,731	58.73%	5,432	41.27%	0	0.00%
2016	8,944	64.12%	4,385	31.44%	620	4.44%
2020	9,668	67.55%	4,357	30.44%	288	2.01%
2024	10,100	70.39%	3,979	27.73%	270	1.88%

== Communities ==
- Beggs
- Bryant
- Dewar
- Dighton
- Eram
- Grayson
- Henryetta
- Hoffman
- Liberty
- Morris
- Okmulgee
- Preston
- Pumpkin Center
- Schulter
- Winchester
- Nuyaka

== Former communities ==
- Browning
- Cobb
- Greene
- Hoardsville
- Kusa
- Mundell
- Parsley
- Sharp
- Spelter City
- Tolon

== Transportation ==
=== Major highways ===
- I-40
- US 62
- US 75
  - US 75 Alt.
- US 266
- SH-16
- SH-52
- SH-56
- Indian Nation Turnpike

== NRHP Sites ==
The following sites in Okmulgee County are listed on the National Register of Historic Places:

- Creek National Capitol, Okmulgee
- Eastside Baptist Church, Okmulgee
- First Baptist Central Church, Okmulgee
- Harmon Athletic Field, Okmulgee
- Hugh Henry House, Henryetta
- Isparhecher House and Grave, Beggs
- Lake Okmulgee Dam Spillway Cascade, Okmulgee
- Nuyaka Mission, Okmulgee
- Okmulgee Armory, Okmulgee
- Okmulgee Black Hospital, Okmulgee
- Okmulgee County Courthouse, Okmulgee
- Okmulgee Downtown Historic District
- Okmulgee Public Library, Okmulgee
- Okmulgee Stock Pavilion, Okmulgee
- Severs Block, Okmulgee
- St. Anthony's Catholic Church, Okmulgee
- Wilson School, Henryetta
