= Hoardsville, Oklahoma =

Hoardsville was formerly a locale in Okmulgee County, Oklahoma. It was situated southeast of Henryetta.

== History ==
Hoardsville was associated with John Henry Hoard, an African-American born in Kentucky who became a pastor at the First Baptist Central Church in Okmulgee in 1899. He purchased farmland in the Henryetta oilfield area, and on February 8, 1909 established the Post Office for Hoardsville, becoming Postmaster. The town was shown on a 1911 Rand-McNally map, located to the southeast of Henryetta. However, the post office was discontinued on July 14, 1914, after which the mail was handled by Henryetta. Hoardsville nevertheless continued to be shown on maps at least as late as 1919 before disappearing.

The Hoardsville Cemetery continues to exist, though sometimes referred to as the Hoytville Cemetery, located on Arbeka Road north of Interstate 40. As of 2024, burials continue to take place there.
