= Kennedy Mansion (Okmulgee, Oklahoma) =

- Severs Block
- U.S. National Register of Historic Places
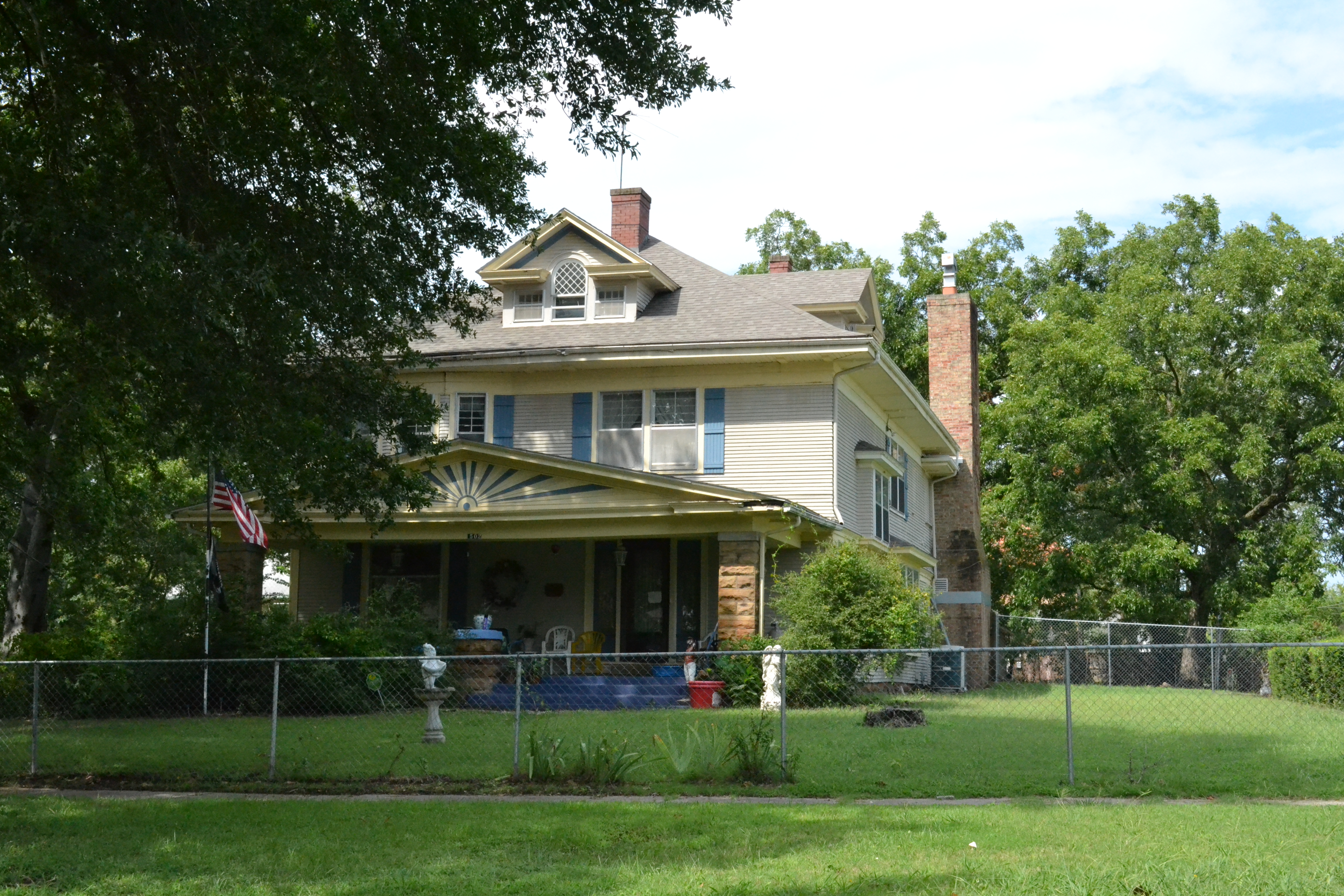

- Location within Oklahoma
- Location: 502 S. Okmulgee Ave., Okmulgee, Oklahoma
- Coordinates: 35°37′07″N 95°58′31″W
- Built: 1904
- Built by: Henry Clay Kennady
- Architectural style: Colonial Revival
- NRHP reference No.: 14001032
- Added to NRHP: December 10, 2014

The Kennedy Mansion is a dwelling located at 502 S. Okmulgee Ave. in Okmulgee, Oklahoma. The mansion was listed on the National Register of Historic Places listings in Okmulgee County, Oklahoma on December 10, 2014.

== History ==
The mansion is located southwest of the commercial core of Okmulgee, which is itself NRHP-listed as the Okmulgee Downtown Historic District. It was constructed for Asa D. Kennedy and Nellie Kennedy; Asa D. Kennedy was a bank founder and real estate investor. The house was completed in 1904 by builder Henry Clay Kennady (sic). The house is a sub-type of the Colonial Revival style, having a hipped roof with a full-width porch; about one-third of Colonial Revival houses built prior to 1915 were of this sub-type.

A two-story clapboard Carriage House, also built around 1904 and located southwest of the main house, is a contributing structure on the property. Also contributing is a one-story shed, built around 1915, which has a set of hinged doors on the side gable elevation and a double hung window in each gable end. A non-contributing structure, a garage built circa 2000, is also on the property. The house is still a private residence.
