= Tulsa Coliseum =

Ice hockey arean in Tulsa, Oklahoma, U.S.

- Tulsa Coliseum c. 1943
- Interactive map of the Tulsa Coliseum area

General information
- Type: Arena
- Architectural style: "Saracenic"
- Location: Fifth Street and Elgin Avenue, Tulsa, Oklahoma, United States
- Coordinates: 36°09′10″N 95°59′06″W
- Opened: January 1, 1929
- Cost: $800,000
- Owner: Walter Robert Whiteside (1929–1942); Coliseum Corporation (1942–1944); Sam Avey (1944–1952)

Height
- Height: 48 ft

Dimensions
- Other dimensions: 160 feet (49 m) across x 300 feet (91 m) long x 48 feet (15 m) high

Design and construction
- Architect: Smith and Senter
- Main contractor: W. S. Bellows

Other information
- Seating capacity: 4,500 (ice hockey); 8,000 (including temporary floor seats)

The Tulsa Coliseum was an indoor arena built in Tulsa, Oklahoma at the corner of Fifth Street and Elgin Avenue. It hosted the Tulsa Oilers ice hockey team from 1929 to 1951. Many other sporting events were held at the facility including rodeos, track meets, professional wrestling, and boxing matches. The building was destroyed by fire in 1952.

Walter Whiteside, a wealthy native of Duluth, Minnesota who was attracted to Tulsa by the oil boom during the 1920s, partnered with W. S. Stryker to form the Magic City Amusement Company. The partnership commissioned noted Tulsa architect Leon Senter to design an indoor arena for the city in 1928. Whiteside, evidently the driving force of the partnership envisioned using the arena to present a variety of public entertainments, including such wintertime sports as ice hockey and ice shows, for which there were no suitable venues south of the Mason-Dixon Line. He even organized the Tulsa Oilers, the first Tulsa Hockey team.

== History ==
=== Walter Whiteside, first owner ===
Walter Whiteside, a millionaire lumberman from Duluth, Minnesota, had it constructed in 1928 at a cost of US$800,000. Whiteside's family was successful in oil, mining and lumber. Whiteside himself was the owner of Douglas Oil Company. Joining forces with W. S. Stryker, he formed Magic City Amusement Co. to have an indoor arena built on Elgin Avenue and extending the entire block between Fifth and Sixth Streets on the east side of downtown Tulsa. (Note: The building's exterior dimensions were reportedly 300 feet (91 m) long by 48 feet (15 m) high.) Whiteside also intended to have the arena introduce winter entertainments such as ice hockey and ice shows. So, when he hired architect Leon B. Senter to design the facility, he specified that it must have the ability to cover the floor with ice within an 8-hour period. The skating oval measured 218 feet (66 m) long by 96 feet (29 m) wide. The building became the first indoor skating rink in this part of the United States.

The building opened on January 1, 1929, with skating displays by the Magic City Amusement Co. (also owned by Whiteside) and the first game of the new Tulsa Oilers, versus the Duluth Hornets. The facility had a seating capacity of 7,500, and boasted a $25,000 organ. The building was sold to Coliseum Corporation at a sheriff's sale in 1942 and later was sold to wrestling promoter Sam Avey in 1944 for $185,000, and it was also known as Avey's Coliseum.

=== Sam Avey, second owner ===
Sam Avey, a native of Kingfisher, Oklahoma was promoter of vaudeville shows. He had spent six years with vaudeville companies during the 1910 decade learning the trade. Shortly after the end of WWI, he went on a tour with noted promoter Billy Sandow and his professional wrestling show.

In 1924, Avey moved his family to Tulsa, intending to start a new venture for Sandow. Avey was well aware that the athletic program at Oklahoma A.& M. (now Oklahoma State University) had become notable for training prospective young professional wrestlers, but there was no venue in Oklahoma to stage public matches, which were becoming wildly popular elsewhere in the country. He met up with Whiteside and concluded that Tulsa was ripe and ready for such a venue.

Pro wrestling shows bore little resemblance to Olympic wrestling, the (Greco-Roman) type that A&M students learned. The emphasis was definitely put on showmanship. Its practitioners had outlandish personalities and questionable ethics. Avey first recruited a former A&M star named Leroy McGuirk, who had become the U.S. Junior Heavyweight wrestling champ. Out of town pros jumped at a chance to take down the local favorite, who was a credible opponent. Unfortunately, McGuirk was blinded in an auto accident en route to a match in Little Rock. Avey took him out of the ring, put him to work setting up matches, and gave him a stake in Avey's company. Other notable performers who graced the Coliseum ring included "Killer" Kowalski, "Strangler" Lewis, "Farmer" Jones and Al "Spider" Galento. "Spider was especially popular because he would offer money to any man in the audience who could stay in the ring with him for more than a minute. The cash reward was one dollar a minute and $100 to any volunteer who won.

The Oilers played in the American Hockey Association (AHA) from 1929 (1928–29 season) - 1942, and the United States Hockey League (USHL) from 1945 to 1951. The Oilers first disbanded in 1942, and were revived under the ownership of Avey in 1945. The Oilers disbanded when the USHL disbanded in 1951.

== Destruction ==
Avey also owned the radio station KAKC, and it broadcast from the Coliseum basement. On September 20, 1952, the building caught fire when it was struck by lightning. A later report said that the KAKC antenna, which was located atop the building had attracted the bolt. The building's dry wooden roof accelerated the fire.

There were no events scheduled that night, so only two people were in the building, both KAKC employees. One happened to be outside on break, when the bolt hit. He went back to the basement office, where his co-worker was monitoring a network feed, unaware of what had just happened to their own building. After switching to look at images from the roof top camera, they exited quickly and safely. The first fire alarm was received at 9:31 PM. Two more alarms were turned in later. Within minutes, Tulsa Fire Department responded to the scene with ten fire trucks and 150 fire fighters. A significant number of responders had come from nearby cities, but all efforts subsequently proved futile. Before midnight, the entire roof collapsed into the building, pulling down much of the exterior walls as it fell. It seemed obvious then that the facility was a total loss.

Avey and his wife had gone out that night to a house-warming party for his daughter and son-in-law, so it took a while before one of his employees located him and gave him the bad news over the telephone. He drove to the site and arrived just after the west section of the roof collapsed. He then went home to watch reports on TV, after telling a reporter, "... I've had too many happy memories in that old barn to watch it die."

Police estimated that the raging fire attracted approximately 12,000 spectators as it occurred, and that another 125,000 drove by the next day to view the wreckage. (Note: By comparison, the 1950 census credited Tulsa as having a total population of 182,740 people.) When another reporter asked Avey about the damage estimate, the owner offhandedly said that it would be about one million dollars. Later, a professional estimate showed that replacement of the facility would cost around $2.5 million. Avey could not raise the additional funding, and had to file for bankruptcy. The debris was removed and the property was cleared for conversion into parking lots. The Coliseum was never repaired or replaced.

== See also ==
- Leroy McGuirk
