= Hoffman, Oklahoma =

- Town
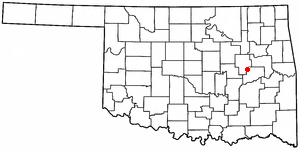
- Location of Hoffman, Oklahoma
- Coordinates: 35°29′20″N 95°50′41″W
- Country: United States
- State: Oklahoma
- County: Okmulgee

Area
  - Total: 0.25 sq mi (0.65 km^{2})
  - Land: 0.25 sq mi (0.65 km^{2})
  - Water: 0 sq mi (0.00 km^{2})
- Elevation: 623 ft (190 m)

Population (2020)
  - Total: 81
  - Density: 321.5/sq mi (124.12/km^{2})
- Time zone: UTC-6 (Central (CST))
  - Summer (DST): UTC-5 (CDT)
- ZIP code: 74437
- Area codes: 539/918
- FIPS code: 40-35300
- GNIS feature ID: 2412759

Hoffman is a town in Okmulgee County, Oklahoma, United States. The population was 81 at the 2020 census.

== History ==
Hoffman was apparently settled before December 18, 1905, when a post office was established. It was originally in McIntosh County until Okmulgee annexed the community in 1918.

The origin of the town name is unclear. The Encyclopedia of Oklahoma History and Culture says that the namesake was either W. Hoffman, vice president of the Missouri, Oklahoma and Gulf Railway, or Roy V. Hoffman, an Oklahoma City attorney.

The population at statehood in 1907 was 344. It fell to 307 in 1910, then rose to a peak of 432 in 1940.

== Geography ==
Hoffman is located northeast of Henryetta off US-266.

According to the United States Census Bureau, the town has a total area of 0.3 square miles (0.78 km^{2}), all land.

== Demographics ==
Historical population
Census	Pop.	Note	%±
1910	307		—
1920	365		18.9%
1930	375		2.7%
1940	432		15.2%
1950	302		−30.1%
1960	248		−17.9%
1970	262		5.6%
1980	407		55.3%
1990	175		−57.0%
2000	148		−15.4%
2010	127		−14.2%
2020	81		−36.2%
U.S. Decennial Census

=== 2020 census ===
As of the 2020 census, Hoffman had a population of 81. The median age was 43.5 years. 19.8% of residents were under the age of 18 and 16.0% of residents were 65 years of age or older. For every 100 females there were 125.0 males, and for every 100 females age 18 and over there were 132.1 males age 18 and over.

0.0% of residents lived in urban areas, while 100.0% lived in rural areas.

There were 34 households in Hoffman, of which 29.4% had children under the age of 18 living in them. Of all households, 44.1% were married-couple households, 23.5% were households with a male householder and no spouse or partner present, and 23.5% were households with a female householder and no spouse or partner present. About 26.4% of all households were made up of individuals and 11.8% had someone living alone who was 65 years of age or older.

There were 44 housing units, of which 22.7% were vacant. The homeowner vacancy rate was 0.0% and the rental vacancy rate was 15.0%.

Racial composition as of the 2020 census
Race	Number	Percent
White	52	64.2%
Black or African American	11	13.6%
American Indian and Alaska Native	7	8.6%
Asian	0	0.0%
Native Hawaiian and Other Pacific Islander	1	1.2%
Some other race	1	1.2%
Two or more races	9	11.1%
Hispanic or Latino (of any race)	1	1.2%

=== 2000 census ===
As of the census of 2000, there were 148 people, 58 households, and 42 families residing in the town. The population density was 566.5 inhabitants per square mile (218.7/km^{2}). There were 82 housing units at an average density of 313.9 per square mile (121.2/km^{2}). The racial makeup of the town was 68.92% White, 18.24% African American, 10.14% Native American, and 2.70% from two or more races. Hispanic or Latino of any race were 1.35% of the population.

There were 58 households, out of which 32.8% had children under the age of 18 living with them, 53.4% were married couples living together, 13.8% had a female householder with no husband present, and 25.9% were non-families. 22.4% of all households were made up of individuals, and 10.3% had someone living alone who was 65 years of age or older. The average household size was 2.55 and the average family size was 2.91.

In the town, the population was spread out, with 28.4% under the age of 18, 5.4% from 18 to 24, 29.7% from 25 to 44, 25.0% from 45 to 64, and 11.5% who were 65 years of age or older. The median age was 37 years. For every 100 females, there were 100.0 males. For every 100 females age 18 and over, there were 86.0 males.

The median income for a household in the town was $21,607, and the median income for a family was $25,625. Males had a median income of $17,083 versus $20,250 for females. The per capita income for the town was $9,227. There were 28.9% of families and 36.8% of the population living below the poverty line, including 36.8% of under eighteens and 23.1% of those over 64.
