= Sam Avey =

American businessman and sports promoter (1895–1962)

Personal information
- Born: February 5, 1895 Kingfisher, Oklahoma, US
- Died: August 9, 1962 (aged 67) Tulsa, Oklahoma

Professional wrestling career
- Debut: 1924
- Retired: 1960

Sam Avey (February 5, 1895 – August 9, 1962) was an American businessman and sports promoter. Best known as the wrestling promoter of little big men, he is also credited for helping to create the Tulsa wrestling territory later used by the National Wrestling Alliance.

== Early life ==
Sam Avey was born in Kingfisher, Oklahoma, on February 5, 1895. Prior to wrestling, Avey was a merchant in the family grocery, located in Cherryvale, Kansas. While growing up in Cherryvale, the community’s most prominent sports celebrity was Billy Sandow. Sandow was the manager of Ed “Strangler” Lewis, and Sandow was the catalyst for Avey’s interest in professional wrestling.

== Professional wrestling ==
After serving in World War I, Avey returned to Cherryvale and was recruited by Sandow to embark upon a wrestling career. He started in wrestling by travelling as a referee. In his early years in wrestling, it was not uncommon that Avey was misspelled Avery. Later on, Avey was brought to Tulsa to promote the matches of Ed “Strangler” Lewis.

At the time, Oklahoma was a breeding ground for potential wrestlers. One of the wrestlers who caught Avey’s eyes was Leroy McGuirk, a grappler from Oklahoma A&M. McGuirk would eventually become a junior heavyweight champion, and wrestlers from all over the country came to Oklahoma.

After McGuirk was injured in auto accident, Avey gave him points in the company and named him the matchmaker. In September 1950, both men were appointed to Executive Positions in the National Wrestling Alliance. McGuirk was appointed as Second Vice-President while Avey was named the Treasurer due to his banking background.

== Hockey and Avey's Coliseum ==
Sam Avey had other interests outside of wrestling. He helped reorganize the American Hockey Association following World War II and owned the Tulsa Oilers hockey club in the 1940s. At the time, the Oilers were affiliated with the United States Hockey League. In 1942, he acquired the Tulsa Coliseum for $185,000, and it was known affectionately as Avey's Coliseum. It regularly hosted prestigious political events and sporting events, such as ice hockey, boxing, and wrestling matches.

Avey also owned the radio station KAKC, and it broadcast from the Coliseum basement. On September 20, 1952, the building was burned to the ground after it was struck by lightning. The building’s wooden roof accelerated the fire.

In January 1958, Avey sold out the wrestling promotion to McGuirk. He left to concentrate on his role as senior vice president with the Farmers and Merchants State Bank. He was still linked to the NWA and remained as Treasurer until August 1960.

== Charitable Work ==
Avey was the director of the Tulsa Chamber of Commerce, president of the Rotary Club and was involved in numerous charities. Said charities included the annual Milk Fund wrestling spectacular every March and a celebrated Christmas party for children.

Part of Avey’s wrestling legacy is that he gave Tulsa a structured promotion, which McGuirk ran with great success. Avey died on August 9, 1962, the age of 67.
