= Leon B. Senter =

American architect (1889–1965)

- Born: Leon Bishop Senter; March 5, 1889; Kansas, (Note: Various sources report the locality as Morris, Morse, Topeka and Johnson County, Shawnee County, Wyandotte County. Given that one source says he attended elementary school in Topeka (Shawnee County), that may be the birthplace. There is also a Morse neighborhood of Overland Park (Johnson County), another possibility.) U.S.
- Died: September 16, 1965 (aged 76); Tulsa, Oklahoma, U.S.
- Other names: Leon Senter, Sr.
- Occupation: Architect
- Years active: 1912–1965
- Practice: Smith, Rae, and Lovitt; Smith, Rea, Lovett, & Senter; Smith & Senter; Senter and Associates

Leon Bishop Senter (March 5, 1889 – September 16, 1965) was an American architect who worked primarily in Oklahoma. Although not formally educated in architecture, he became Oklahoma's first licensed architect in 1925 and designed several buildings on the National Register of Historic Places.

== Background ==
Senter was born in Johnson County, Kansas to James and Emma Senter, received his primary education Topeka and graduated from Manual High School in Kansas City, a vocational school. He then enrolled in International Correspondence School (ICS), a correspondence school to study architectural engineering, including basic drafting and building design. He also gained experience under local draftsmen and architects. (Note: No source indicates he attended any university or college. However the Tulsa Foundation for Architecture biography credits Senter with earning a certificate in Architectural Engineering from International Correspondence Schools (ICS).)

He worked as a steel superintendent in 1910 for a Kansas City, Missouri construction company the Oak Cliff Viaduct, a 6,562-foot-long (2,000 m) viaduct being built between Dallas and Oak Cliff, Texas By 1912, he had secured a position with the Smith, Rae, and Lovitt architectural firm in Kansas City, Missouri as a draftsman and specification writer. (Note: The individual partners were: Charles A. Smith, Frank S. Rea and Walter Y. Lovitt.) When the partners decided to open a new office in Okmulgee, Oklahoma in 1915, Senter was named branch manager there while the other partners remained in Kansas City between. In 1918, he was made a full partner in the firm (renamed Smith, Rea, Lovitt & Senter) and remained in Okmulgee.

After Frank Rea died in 1920, the partnership was dissolved. In 1924, it was reformed as Smith & Senter, headquartered in Okmulgee. Senter became the first architect in Oklahoma to become a Registered Architect in 1925, after the state enacted a law requiring registration of architects. He carried License Number 1 for the rest of his career.

In 1928, Senter opened an office in Tulsa at the request of millionaire Waite Phillips, whom Senter met earlier in Okmulgee when Philips was in the oil business and they were neighbors. Phillips hired Senter to design the Philcade Building, a nine-story annex to the Philtower Building. The Tulsa office of Smith & Senter was the first tenant of the Philtower Building. By 1933, Senter was working independently and renamed the firm Senter and Associates. He son, Leon B. Senter, Jr., who had also become an architect, joined the firm. Senter remained active there until his death in 1965.

== Building in Okmulgee ==
Senter designed of several significant buildings during his time in Okmulgee. These include:

- Orpheum Theatre (1919), a vaudeville theater with an ornate terra cotta exterior. (Note: Credited to Smith, Rea, Lovitt & Senter in the ODHD NRHP nomination form)
- Okmulgee Country Club and Golf Course, (1920). As of 2018, it still stands at 1400 S Mission Lane in Okmulgee, and was added to the National Register of Historic Places (NRHP). When it opened, the facility had a clubhouse, golf course, tennis courts and croquet ground. The article said the State Historic Preservation Office described it as "an exceptional example of the Bungalow/Craftsman style clubhouse.
- Commerce Building, 117-121 S. Grand (1921), at eight stories, it was the tallest office building built during the Okmulgee oil boom and most ornate. (Note: Credited to Smith & Senter in the ODHD NRHP nomination form)
- McCullough Building (1926), a six-story, red brick and terracotta office building at the corner of fifth and Grand in the Okmulgee Downtown Historic District (ODHD). The sixth floor has served as the Masonic Temple for much of the building's history.
- Okmulgee Public Library (1922), a Carnegie Library, individually listed on the National Register of Historic Places.

== Buildings in Tulsa ==
=== Coliseum ===
The Tulsa Coliseum was a major commission for the firm in Tulsa, (Note: It is unclear what role Smith was playing by this time, and even whether he had moved to Tulsa himself, since it seems that Senter was rapidly becoming credited with all of the firm's designs.) a multi-purpose, indoor arena built by Walter Whiteside, a Minnesota millionaire who wanted to introduce ice hockey to the southwest. The building had a terazzo floor for regular events such as circuses and musical performances. The floor was flooded and frozen by refrigerant circulated in pipes cast into the concrete beneath to make the ice rink. The system had an elaborate design to prevent cracking during the freeze-thaw cycles, made of layers of concrete, asphalt, cork board, sand, concrete with steel aggregate, and finally the terazzo. The building also had a unique acoustic ceiling made with tons of crushed sugar cane fibers (bagasse). According to a newspaper article covering the grand opening, the ceiling, designed by "expert acoustical engineers on the staff of Smith and Senter ... makes the coliseum's acoustics perfect for conventions, theatrical attractions and musical entertainments." The building was the first indoor ice rink south of the Mason–Dixon line and home of the Tulsa Oilers from 1929 until it was destroyed by fire in 1952.

=== Other buildings ===
The Tulsa Foundation for Architecture compiled the following list of projects completed by Leon Senter after he moved his office to Tulsa:

- Tulsa Coliseum (1928) Saracen Revival style (destroyed by fire after a lightning strike in 1952)
- Philcade Building (1929-1930) Art Deco style, NRHP listed
- Skelly Stadium University of Tulsa - Skelly Stadium (1930)
- Tulsa Fire Alarm Building (1931), NRHP listed
- Tulsa Municipal Airport Administration Building (1932, Smith & Senter)
- Union Bus Depot (1935) Art Deco style
- Will Rogers High School (1939) Art Deco style, NRHP listed
- Arco Building (1949), built as the Service Pipe Line Co. Building, later known as the Stanolind Building or Amoco East Building, Streamline/Art Moderne style
- Booker T. Washington High School (1950)
- Mayo Motor Inn (1952)
- First Baptist Church Educational Building (1953)
- Downtown Tulsa YMCA (1953) International style
- Continental Baking Company (1956)
- St. John's Hospital (south and west additions)
- Carter Oil Company Research Laboratory
- Page Belcher Federal Building and United States Post Office (1967), International style

== Architectural style ==
Although Senter was sometime labeled primarily a designer of Art Deco, over his long career he working in many styles as leading trends changed. Some of his early works were in Spanish Baroque Revival, Beaux-Arts, Georgian Revival and Renaissance Revival. Coincident with moving to Tulsa at the end of the 1920s and the rising popularity of Art Deco in the United States, his best-known early works in Tulsa were of that style. Post-World War II works reflected the post-Art Deco styles that were then in vogue, including Streamline/Art Moderne, and International style.

== Professional honors and recognition ==
Senter was elected as a Fellow of the American Institute of Architects in 1957. He was also a former president and founding member of the Oklahoma chapter. He served as a member of the National Council of Architectural Registration Boards, as a member of the licensing board for Oklahoma architects (State Board of Governors of Licensed Architects in Oklahoma), and as a member of the board of design for the Tulsa Civic Center, the American Society of Planning Officials, Tulsa City Planning Commission for 13 years, the Oklahoma State Planning Commission, and a State Director of the Historical American Building Survey. He was made a Fellow of the International Institute of Arts and Letters (Geneva, Switzerland) in 1962. In 1963, he was recognized by the City of Tulsa for "his many contributions to the city" with a Bronze Key. He had served on the City Planning Board for 19 years.

== Personal life ==
On November 2, 1910, he married Murriel Houghton a native of Streator, Illinois, with whom he had three children, including Leon B. Senter, Junior, who also became an architect.
