= Tulsa Fire Alarm Building =

- U.S. National Register of Historic Places
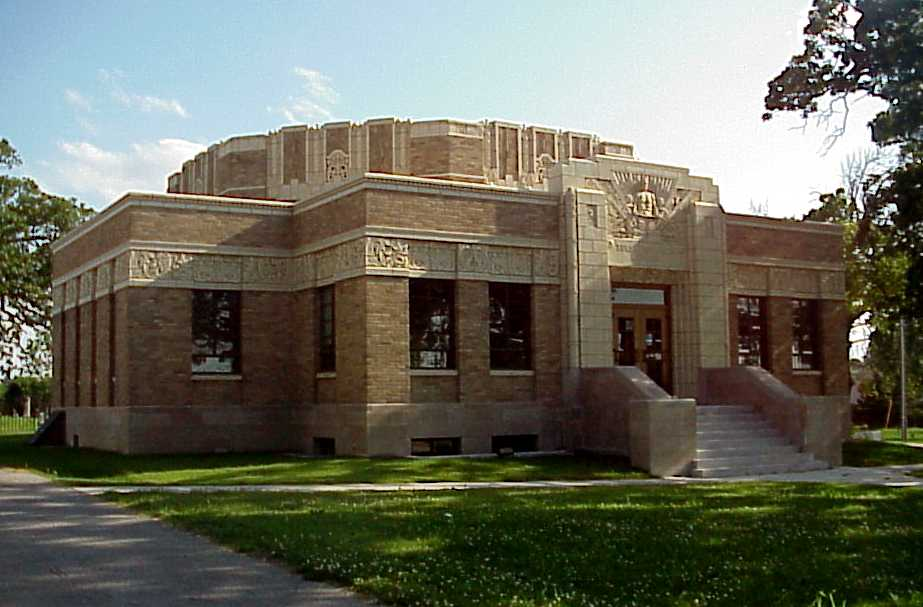
- Tulsa Fire Alarm Building in 2007

- Location within Oklahoma Location within the United States
- Location: Tulsa, Oklahoma
- Coordinates: 36°8′59.53″N 95°58′43.42″W
- Built: 1931-1934
- Architect: Frederick V. Kershner, of Smith & Senter
- Architectural style: Art Deco
- NRHP reference No.: 03000879
- Added to NRHP: September 2, 2003

The Tulsa Fire Alarm Building is a historic Art Deco building at 1010 East Eighth Street in the Pearl District of Tulsa, Oklahoma. It was built in 1931 and served as the central reporting station for the Tulsa Fire Department. Fires were reported from alarm boxes spread around town to this building and the firemen in this building would alert the fire station closest to the fire. At the time of its construction, this system was the best available alarm system. The building is just east of the Inner Dispersal Loop in Tulsa's Pearl District.

== Building design ==
The building was designed by architect Frederick V. Kershner and inspired by Mayan temple design. (Note: Kershner was a young architect employed by Smith and Senter, the Tulsa architectural design firm who had been awarded the contract for the building.) It is relatively small, containing only 6,090 square feet (566 m^{2}) of space. The building has a structural steel frame and masonry walls. It features an extensive terra cotta frieze program, with several fire-related motifs. A recurring theme on the front facade is a double-headed dragon. The large frieze over the front door depicts a half-naked male figure holding in his hands Gamewell alarm tape (Note: The alarm system originally developed by James Gamewell was considered the state of the art when the Tulsa Fire Alarm Building was constructed. By 1910, the Gamewell system dominated the U. S. market for fire alarm devises.) (part of the first alarm system used in this building; the paper tape was punched with the number of the fire alarm box making the call) and who is flanked by two helmeted firefighters. The building originally had two large art deco style lanterns above the front doorway. (Note: The original brass entrance doors and the decorative lanterns were removed by vandals.) The back side of the building has four gargoyle-like figures topped with a hatchet on either side of nine windows.

The basement once housed an auxiliary generator system. Although the building was completed in 1931, it took three more years to complete the hookups to the alarm boxes that were dispersed throughout the city. The system went into service in 1934.

== Change to another use ==
Advances in alarm system and dispatching technology made the Gamewell obsolete by 1958, although Tulsa maintained its system as a backup until 1966. The Fire Alarm Office moved to the newer Police & Municipal Courts Building at the Civic Center in 1981. The building was used by the Fire department until 1984. It was left vacant and fell into disrepair. In 1994, it was purchased by Martin Newman, chairman of the Tulsa Preservation Commission. During the hiatus, it was damaged by a flood in 1984 and by vandalism. After purchase by the American Lung Association of Oklahoma around 2000, the group spent more than five years raising $3.2 million and rebuilding the facility, both as the group's new headquarters and as a showcase for the best construction methods and materials to promote healthy indoor air quality. The building was listed on the National Register of Historic Places in 2003, under Criteria A and C. The NRIS number is 03000879.

== Tulsa Fire Museum ==
The Tulsa Development Authority reached a preliminary agreement to sell the building to the Firefighters Union for a museum in 1986–1987, but the union was unable to raise the necessary funding for the project.

Having instead been purchased by the American Lung Association of Oklahoma, the building was reported in March 2015 to be up for sale. A group of fire history buffs and other interested people wished to purchase and turn it into a museum that would display a large collection of fire fighting memorabilia.

The Tulsa World reported on July 29, 2015, that the building had been sold to The Carol Tandy Foundation, a private organization, which would donate it to Tulsa Firefighters Museum Inc.

As of the beginning of 2021, the Museum was still in the planning stages, with the Museum website indicating the main Fire Alarm Building will show artifacts from the history of Tulsa's fire service, while the lower level will be an interactive kid's area. The website of James Boswell, Architect shows more ambitious plans, which include not only renovation of the original building, but also the addition of more exhibit space and an outdoor event plaza.

By early 2026, the museum was scheduling regular Open Houses, rotating between weekend afternoons and weekday evenings on alternate months. It was also launching a fundraising campaign for the planning phase of their intended expansion, possibly to be completed by late 2028.

== See also ==
- Fire alarm call box
