= Eram, Oklahoma =

Unincorporated Community in Oklahoma, United States

Coordinates: 35°37′01″N 95°45′18″W

Eram is an unincorporated community in Okmulgee County in the U.S. state of Oklahoma. It is located approximately five miles east of Morris, to the north of US Highway 62. It appears on a 1911 Rand-McNally map of the county. The town had a post office starting in 1913, but ending in 1950.

The name of Eram is "reportedly derived from the initials of the four children of Ed Oates: Eugene, Roderick, Anthony, and Marie".
