= Kusa, Oklahoma =

Coordinates: 35°26′57″N 95°55′27″W

Kusa is a populated place located in Okmulgee County, Oklahoma, about 4 miles east-northeast of Henryetta. Officially incorporated March 27, 1916, and located in the Henryetta Coal Mining District, Kusa became a coal mining and lead smelting boomtown, complete with movie theaters, hotels, and banks. It even had its own newspaper, The Kusa Industrial, which published between 1914 and 1920. The population grew to a size of about 3,500, making it the largest town in the county at one point.

While coal mining was the major draw, the town was the site of a 47-acre horizontal retort smelter which processed zinc ore beginning in 1915, but ending in 1928. Brickmaking grew up in the 1920s spurred by the need to make the construction grade bricks, fireclay retorts, and clay condensers that were used in the zinc smelting operation; but, those facilities were cleared by 1949. Along with these shutdowns and the closure of the coal mines, Kusa's anticipated bright future was short-circuited by the railroad bypassing the locale in favor of Henryetta, and later by the highway (Highway 266) bypassing it to the north. The town's incorporation was eventually dissolved, and nothing is now left of the original buildings except foundations, although some people still live in the area.
