= Severs Block =

Buildings in Okmulgee, Oklahoma

- U.S. National Register of Historic Places
- U.S. Historic district – Contributing property
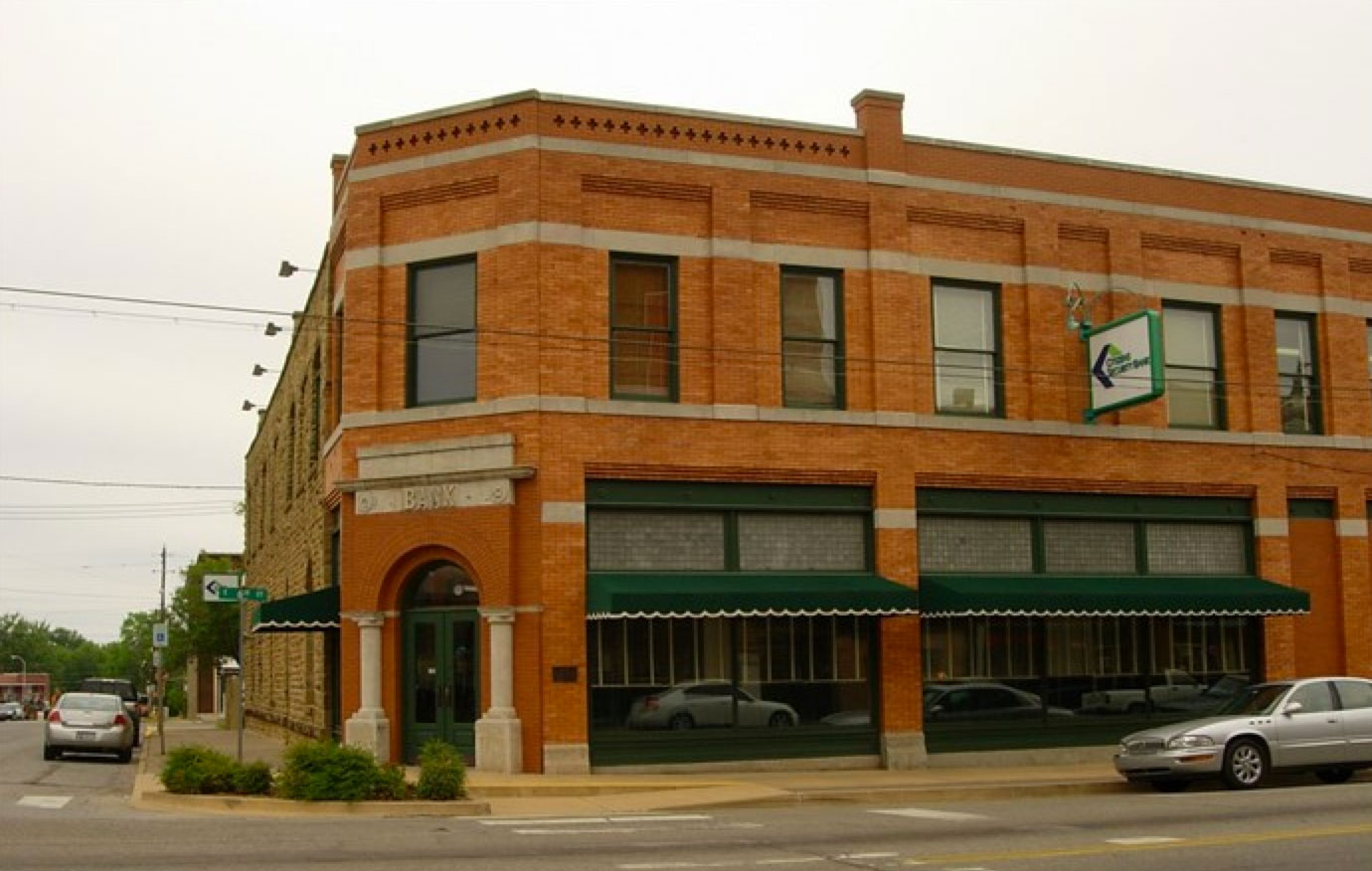
- Building in 2010

- Location within Oklahoma
- Location: 101 E. 6th St., Okmulgee, Oklahoma
- Coordinates: 35°37′24″N 95°58′16″W
- Area: 2.5 acres (1.0 ha)
- Built: 1907
- Architectural style: Romanesque Revival
- Part of: Okmulgee Downtown Historic District (ID92001693)
- NRHP reference No.: 91000311

Significant dates
- Added to NRHP: March 22, 1991
- Designated CP: December 17, 1992

Built between 1904 and 1907, the Severs Block at 101 E. 6th St. in Okmulgee, Oklahoma is a two-story generally rectangular brick building which incorporates an earlier two-story stone building (now the west wall and a part of the rear wall). The 1882 F.B. Severs’ General Store was a Romanesque structure, the second stone building in all of Okmulgee and the first two-story stone building. Frederick Severs himself expanded his building with the new construction that included storefronts and office space. The canted corner entrance faces the Creek National Capitol. The building was rehabilitated in 1989; that renovation reversed extensive remodeling efforts made in 1954, reconstructed the entry from historical photographs, and generally returned the building to its appearance at the time of its construction.

Severs Block is significant in the area's history. The original Severs Building was the primary supplier of general goods in the Creek Nation from 1882 until the turn of the century, and the Severs Block played a significant role In Okmulgee's commercial development through the first half of the 20th Century. It is also an excellent example of pre-Statehood commercial buildings.

The Severs Block was added to the National Register of Historic Places on March 3, 1991.

It was further included on the National Register again as a contributing building in the 1992 listing of the Okmulgee Downtown Historic District.

== See also ==
- National Register of Historic Places listings in Okmulgee County, Oklahoma
