= Tulsa Fire Department =

Fire department of Tulsa, Oklahoma

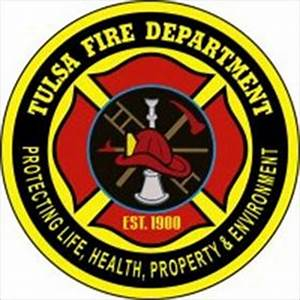

Operational area
- Country: United States
- State: Oklahoma
- City: Tulsa
- Address: 1760 Newblock Park Dr

Agency overview
- Established: June 6, 1900
- Annual calls: 57,000
- Annual budget: $76.3 million
- Fire chief: Michael Baker

Facilities and equipment
- Stations: 29
- Ambulances: Tulsa Metropolitan Area is worked EMSA

Website
- Official website

The Tulsa Fire Department is the fire department for the City of Tulsa, Oklahoma, serving approximately 400,000 citizens out of their 29 fire stations in an area of 201 square miles. The department was founded as a volunteer fire department on June 6, 1900, following a fire that broke out in Downtown Tulsa in 1897. The Tulsa Fire Department headquarters is located at 1760 Newblock Park Drive and the current fire chief is Michael Baker.

== History ==
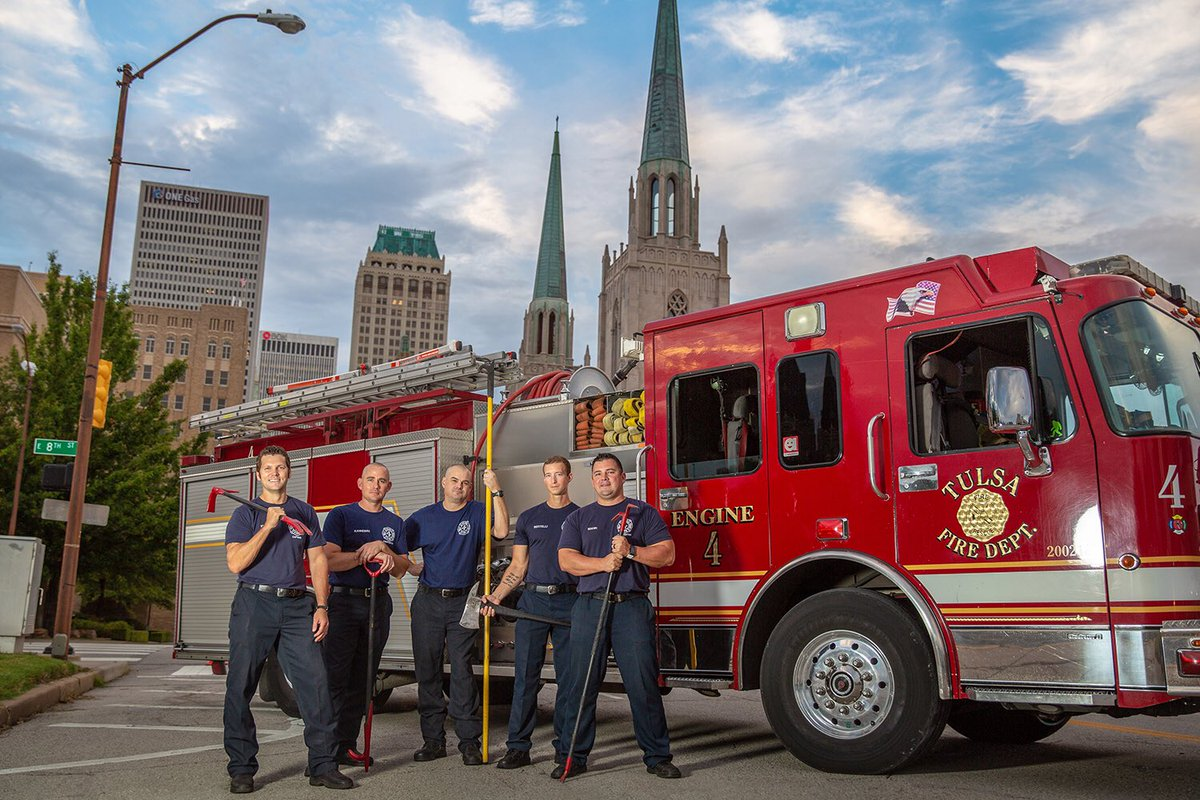
Some of the members of Engine #4.

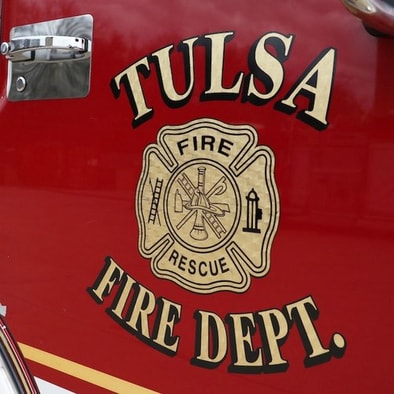
Detail of a fire truck of the department

=== R. C. Alder (1900–1922) ===
On June 6, 1900, the Tulsa Volunteer Fire Department was officially founded and R. C. Alder was elected fire chief for the city of Tulsa. In 1901, the fire department received its first alarm and responded to deployed hoses and water more effectively than ever before. The city council decided to pay for a chemical truck and start paying them for their response. The chemical truck was named "Old Soda Fountain" and saved multiple buildings while in service. In early 1905, Chief Alder was sent to Kansas City to choose some recruits and a horse team, leading to the first paid fire department in Tulsa.

When the electric call boxes were installed around Tulsa it allowed the Tulsa Fire Department to respond more efficiently and frequently to calls. In February 1906, the Tulsa Fire Department was called the most perfect department in the country. The head of the rating bureau, Mr. Ingalls said if all the fire departments in the US followed off of Tulsa the number of fire losses would be decreased by 50% nationwide.

The Tulsa Fire Department received their first motorized vehicle in 1907. In 1908, the Tulsa Fire Department purchased its first aerial ladder truck, a horse team, and a 75-foot aerial ladder for $5,000. By October 1, 1913, everything in Tulsa Fire Department was motorized. The Tulsa Fire Department was the first fire department west of the Mississippi River to be completely motorized.

On October 24, 1917, two firefighters, Ross Shepard and Ben Hanes, were killed while fighting a fire at the Mayo Building when they fell through a stairwell. In 1919, the men had 84 hour work weeks divided into two shifts.

=== Wesley Bush (1922–1926) ===
While chief Wesley Bush was chief, Tulsa Fire Department received 3 new Seagrave Fire Apparatus pumper trucks in 1924. The department had 13 companies and 122 men on the payroll in 1924. On July 1, 1926, the end of the fiscal year showed that the Tulsa Fire Department had responded to 1,091 alarms. Later that year Bush stepped down from his position as fire chief.

=== R. E. Pitts (1926–1933) ===
The NFBU rated Tulsa Fire Department as one of the best in the nation in 1927. The department ranked among the best despite being undermanned and inadequately equipped. On April 3, 1928, the firemen submitted a "petition NO. 2" to raise the salary from $0.42 an hour to $0.56 per hour. In 1931 each man signed a contract saying they would pay the survivors of an active firefighter in the event they died on or off the job. In 1931 the fire department had 161 men, 12 pump trucks, 4 ladders, and 3 hose carts. Chief R. E. Pitts retired on June 28, 1933.

=== R. W. Granger (1933–1940) ===
Granger started his career with the company on June 1, 1933, as fire chief. In December 1935, Chief Granger made up a Drill Evolution Instruction Guide for governing Company Evolutions. It consisted of "Order No. l," which spelled out how the Drill Evolutions would be carried out, and "Evolution No. l," which was to lay a line into the Drill Tower and charge it". Granger served for 7 years before being replaced by Fire Chief C.C. Jennings.

=== C. C. Jennings (1940–1950) ===
In 1940, the fire department received 2 1939 Ford sedans for the district chiefs. In 1941, Captain J.C. Warf was thrown from an open cab Seagrave pumper truck during a collision at Pine and Rockford. Captain Warf died at the age of 51 the next day at Hillcrest Medical Center. In 1943, each Tulsa fire truck would receive a 2-way mobile radio. In 1945 the Tulsa Fire Department got its radio station. In 1949 Fire Station #16 was opened and equipped with a 1949 500 gallon American La France Pumper. After 30 years of service, Chief Jennings retired from the department, having been Chief for 10 years.

=== G. N. Paris (1950–1956) ===
Chief Paris was the department's sixth fire chief and would remain in this position for 6 years. On January 29, 1955, the department changed to a schedule of 24 hours on 48 hours off. On May 15, 1956, Chief Paris retired after 27 years with the department.

=== Galaird Sartain (1956–1964) ===
Galaird was put in as chief after Paris had retired two days before his inauguration as chief. On October 6, 1956, a fire destroyed the downtown Safeway Store. The loss was estimated to be $500,000. The fire broke through the roof, imperiling some thirty homes in the area. This was a pivotal moment at the beginning of his career as chief. In 1958, four new fire stations were built and put in the city that year. In 1961, the Tulsa Fire Department received the highest honor ever afforded to a fire department in Oklahoma. The Tulsa Fire Department was chosen by the NFPA to be included in a training video "Fighting Tank Fires". In 1964, Chief Sartain retired on July 1 after about 8 years with the force.

=== E. S. Hawkins (1964–1985) ===
At the beginning of his time as Chief, the Tulsa Fire Department was said to have been worth around $1,117,225. In 1965, the Tulsa Fire Department purchased an aircraft accident truck and station it at Tulsa International Airport as Unit 51. In 1965, a fire at the London Square apartments claimed the lives of a mother and her 3 kids. The fire brought attention to the fact that firewalls weren't being built in multi-dwelling buildings such as the London Square Apartments. A year later in 1966, another fire broke out in the London Square Apartments but the fire was under control quickly and was put out efficiently. The Tulsa Fire Department said it was because a firewall was built. In 1965 the Tulsa Fire Department started installing the microwave teletype which would replace underground cables.

In 1968, Tulsa firefighters voted to raise the retirement fund to $3,500. Firefighters were required to use full protective clothing and use the SCBA in 1978. T.R. Coatney suffered a heart attack and died at station 11 on June 29, 1978. His death was considered a Line of Duty Death. Tulsa Fire Department created a 4-minute response time standard for EMS calls in 1981.

In 1982, members of the Tulsa Fire Department were called to Crutchfield Park to fill a small pool with water for the filming of The Outsiders. The fire department also helped wet down streets for night filming. In 1982, Dwight Wilson of Station 19 was awarded the Certificate of Merit by the American Red Cross for resuscitating a 15-year-old boy who was exposed to smoke. Chief Hawkins retired in 1985 after 21 years as the Chief of the fire department.

=== T. L. Baker (1985–2002) ===
An explosion at the Alfred P. Murrah Federal Building in Oklahoma City killed 168 people on April 19, 1995, during the Oklahoma City bombing. Multiple rescue crews responded from Tulsa.

The budget for Tulsa Fire Department in 1996 was $40.2 million. Firefighter W.D. Meyers suffered a heart attack while returning from an incident in Engine #17; his death was considered a line-of-duty death. Chief Baker retired in 2002, and would be succeeded by C.A. Lacroix.

=== C. A. Lacroix (2002–2012) ===
Lacroix started his new position in 2002 after former Chief Baker had retired. In 1999, the fire departments had decided to help make a bigger role in the Emergency Medical Service by adding five Advanced Life Supports called E22, E23, E24, E27, E29, and these support systems were put into effect in 2002. On December 7, 2007 "one of the worst ice storms Tulsa would ever see". The station had received hundreds of calls of power outages, damaged properties, civilian casualties, and the total loss of life at 60. During the Great Recession between 2007 and 2009, the department faced budget cuts and downsizing. During this time the benefits of funding coming in from Vision 2025 were seen. Lacroix retired in June 2012 after 10 years as chief.

=== R. D. Driskell (2012–2020) ===
Ray Driskell was chosen to be the next chief of the fire department on May 2, 2012, by former Tulsa Mayor Dewey Bartlett. Driskell was employed with the position in late June 2012. In Driskell's term, he experienced the mobile rise of technology within the company. Former fire chief E. Stanley Hawkins died in July 2013 at the age of 92 years. Chief Hawkins served the department for 37 years, of which 21 years were as chief.

In 2015, Captain Greta Hurt was promoted to District Chief. She was the first female to achieve that accomplishment. Twenty-three people were hospitalized in October 2015, after a rash of K2 poisonings hit Tulsa. Many were patrons of the Iron Gate Soup kitchen downtown. Driskell was disciplined by Bynum in 2017 after the local firefighters union issued a vote of no-confidence against him stemming from a firefighter's complaint. After 35 years with the department and serving a little less than 8 years as chief, Driskell decided to retire from his position. Current Tulsa Mayor G. T. Bynum had appointed Deputy Fire Chief Scott Clark as interim chief until the new chief was selected.

=== Michael Baker (2020–present) ===
Michael Baker started his term as chief of the fire department on June 16, 2020, by Mayor Bynum. Chief Baker has served more than thirty years in public safety, and twenty-five of those with the Tulsa Fire Department. Baker had formerly been the chief of the emergency medical services. He's played a key role in the development of the fire department's Community Assistance, Referral, and Education Services (CARES) program.

In November 2020, Pro-Tec Fire Services, a Wisconsin-based fire protection agency, signed a five-year contract to take over fire operations at Tulsa International Airport starting on March 1, 2021. Baker stated the Tulsa Fire Department would still respond for medical emergencies and emergencies with large aircraft.

On September 10, 2021, FEMA awarded Tulsa Fire Department with a $12 million Staffing For Adequate Fire and Emergency Response (SAFER) grant. Chief Baker stated the grant would be spread across three years and will be used to fill sixty empty positions within the department.

In January 2022, Tulsa news channel KJRH reported an increase in structure fires compared to years prior. By January 24, Tulsa Fire had run on 100 structure fires; from 2019 to 2021, the department had averaged about 65 by the same time of year. Tulsa Fire public information officer Andy Little stated the fires were often being caused by space heaters and people looking for shelter in vacant homes.

In February 2022, Tulsa firefighters sued the city over unpaid overtime. Tulsa firefighter union president Matt Lay said that the city of Tulsa is obligated to pay for the overtime in accordance with the Fair Labor Standards Act. Approximately 600 firefighters are involved in the suit.

== See also ==
- Sand Springs Fire Department
- Tulsa Fire Alarm Building
