= Philcade Building =

Office building in Tulsa, Oklahoma, U.S.

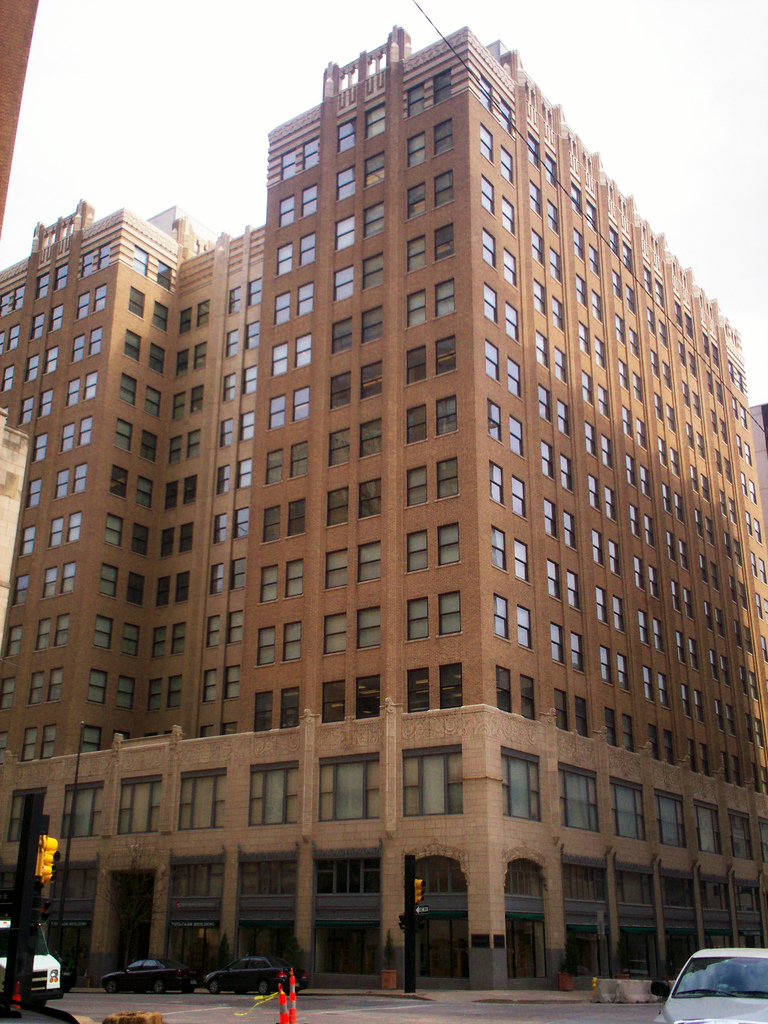
- Interactive map of the Philcade Building area
- Former names: Philcade Building, Stanolind Building, Amoco North Building, 501 South Boston Building

General information
- Architectural style: Art Deco Zigzag style
- Location: 5th Street and Boston Avenue (southeast corner), Tulsa, Oklahoma, US
- Coordinates: 36.1515°N 95.9887°W
- Groundbreaking: 1929
- Completed: 1931
- Renovated: 1937 (major addition floors 3–13 and penthouse)

Height
- Height: 167 ft (51 m)

Technical details
- Material: Reinforced concrete
- Floor count: 13 (excluding penthouse)

Design and construction
- Architect: Leon B. Senter
- Architecture firm: Smith & Senter
- Philcade Building
- U.S. National Register of Historic Places
- U.S. Historic district – Contributing property
- Location within Oklahoma
- Area: 1 acre (0.40 ha)
- Part of: Oil Capital Historic District (ID10001013)
- NRHP reference No.: 86002196

Significant dates
- Added to NRHP: September 18, 1986
- Designated CP: December 13, 2010

The Philcade Building is an office building in downtown Tulsa, Oklahoma at the southeast corner of East 5th Street and South Boston Avenue. Designed by Leon B. Senter, for oilman Waite Phillips, it was begun in 1929 and completed in 1931. It is noted for its Art Deco zigzag style architecture. The building was listed in the National Register on September 18, 1986, under National Register Criterion C. Its NRIS number is 86002196. It is also a contributing property of the Oil Capital Historic District in Tulsa.

Initially named the Philcade, which was derived from the name of the owner, the building was renamed the Stanolind Building, after the company bought the building from Phillips in 1942. Stanolind was a subsidiary of Standard Oil Company (Indiana). It became the Amoco North Building after Standard Oil Company (Indiana) was rebranded with the name of its Amoco subsidiary, and the 501 Boston Building. The Tulsa Preservation Commission identified the building location as 515 South Boston Avenue, which disagrees with other sources. The name Philcade has returned to popular usage.

== Building description ==
The Philcade was designed to complement the Philtower Building, which stood directly across 5th Street and was also owned initially by Waite Phillips.The Philcade's architectural style is said to be Art Deco Zigzag style, while the Philtower is listed as Gothic Revival. The Philcade is 13 stories tall (not including the penthouse that was added later), and covered with buff brick. The first three stories on the north side have a terra cotta facing. The ground floor, mezzanine and second floor were designed to house retail stores. Office suites filled the building from the third story up. The NRHP application for the building says that it actually had 13 stories plus a penthouse. The latter was added in 1937, and designed to be a private residence for Waite Phillips and his wife.

=== Exterior design ===
The building went through several major design changes before its completion. Phillips originally planned for it to be six stories tall. He then changed the height to nine stories, and finally increased it to 13 stories. Above the second floor, the office tower had a cross section shaped like an "H", with the wings extending north and south. The recessed area between the wings created a light well that provided ventilation as well as light to the inner offices.

The exterior of the ground floor, mezzanine and second floor are covered with terra cotta. Exterior ornamentation on these floors reflect French Moderne design, featuring stylized flora and fauna, Egyptian motifs, and naturalistic forms. The terra cotta roofline also has Egyptian style decoration. The main entrances to the building have Egyptian style columns that extend to the second floor. The columns stop at a horizontal terra cotta beam which bears a crest with the initials "WP" surrounded by carved vines, fruits and flowers.

=== 1937 modification ===
In 1937, Phillips had the open light well on the south enclosed and topped by the penthouse that would become the Phillips' residence. Waite and his wife lived there after they decided to donate their mansion, Villa Philbrook, to the city of Tulsa. The mansion became the home of the Philbrook Museum of Art. The cooling towers for the Philcade's air conditioning system were placed atop the two wings extending north, so that they could not be seen easily from the street level.

=== Interior design ===
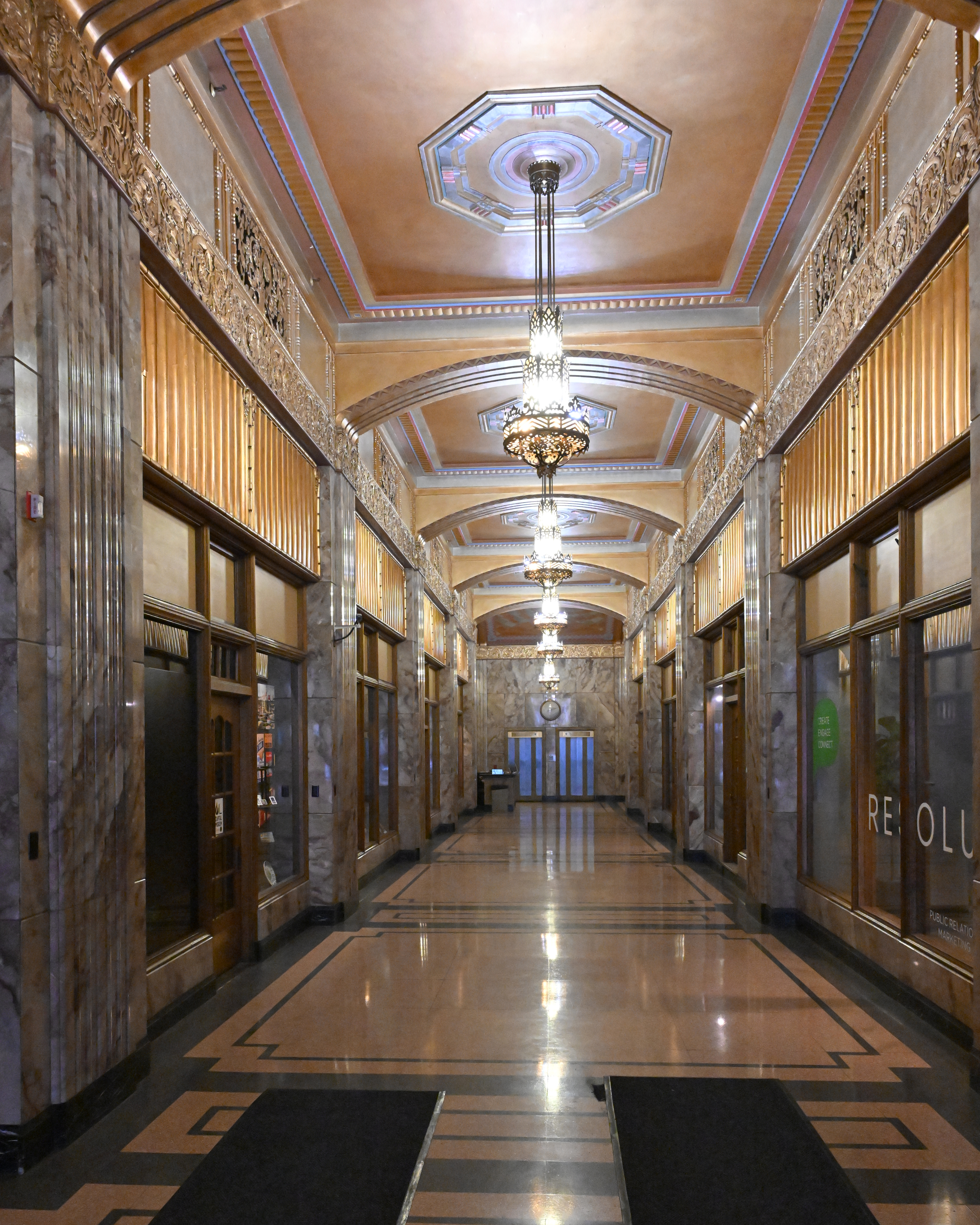
Philcade Building lobby hall

The Philcade may be better known for its interior design, especially its lavishly decorated lobby. Marble pilasters support a plaster frieze, covered with gold leaf, at the mezzanine. The arched ceiling is decorated with geometric designs that are hand painted in red, blue, green, purple, and brown. The ceiling is trimmed with gold leaf. Bronze filagree chandeliers hang from the center of each ceiling design.

Floors 3 to 13 were devoted to multi-use office suites, having repetitive designs and lacking significant architectural detail. The penthouse, added in 1937, has 23 rooms, containing 4,000 square feet (370 m^{2}) of space. Rooms in the penthouse residence have walls paneled with hardwood and Art Deco type details. The Phillips moved in about the time they donated their Villa Philbrook to Tulsa as a museum.

=== Connecting tunnel ===
The Philcade and the Philtower are connected by a tunnel built in 1929 that runs beneath 5th Street, a distance of 80 feet (24 m). The reason given was to facilitate moving freight between the two buildings. Some sources have said that Waite Phillips feared that he might be kidnapped by gangsters while walking between his home and his office, and that the tunnel would offer him more security. It was not an unreasonable fear, because there had already been instances in other cities where wealthy men were kidnapped off streets and held for ransom.

This tunnel was the first such built in Tulsa. More would be constructed during the next decade, connecting with other important buildings. The tunnel remained open for general usage for many years. The tunnel door beneath the Philcade is now locked at all times, making this segment closed to the public.
