= Eastside Baptist Church =

Historic church in Oklahoma, United States

- U.S. National Register of Historic Places
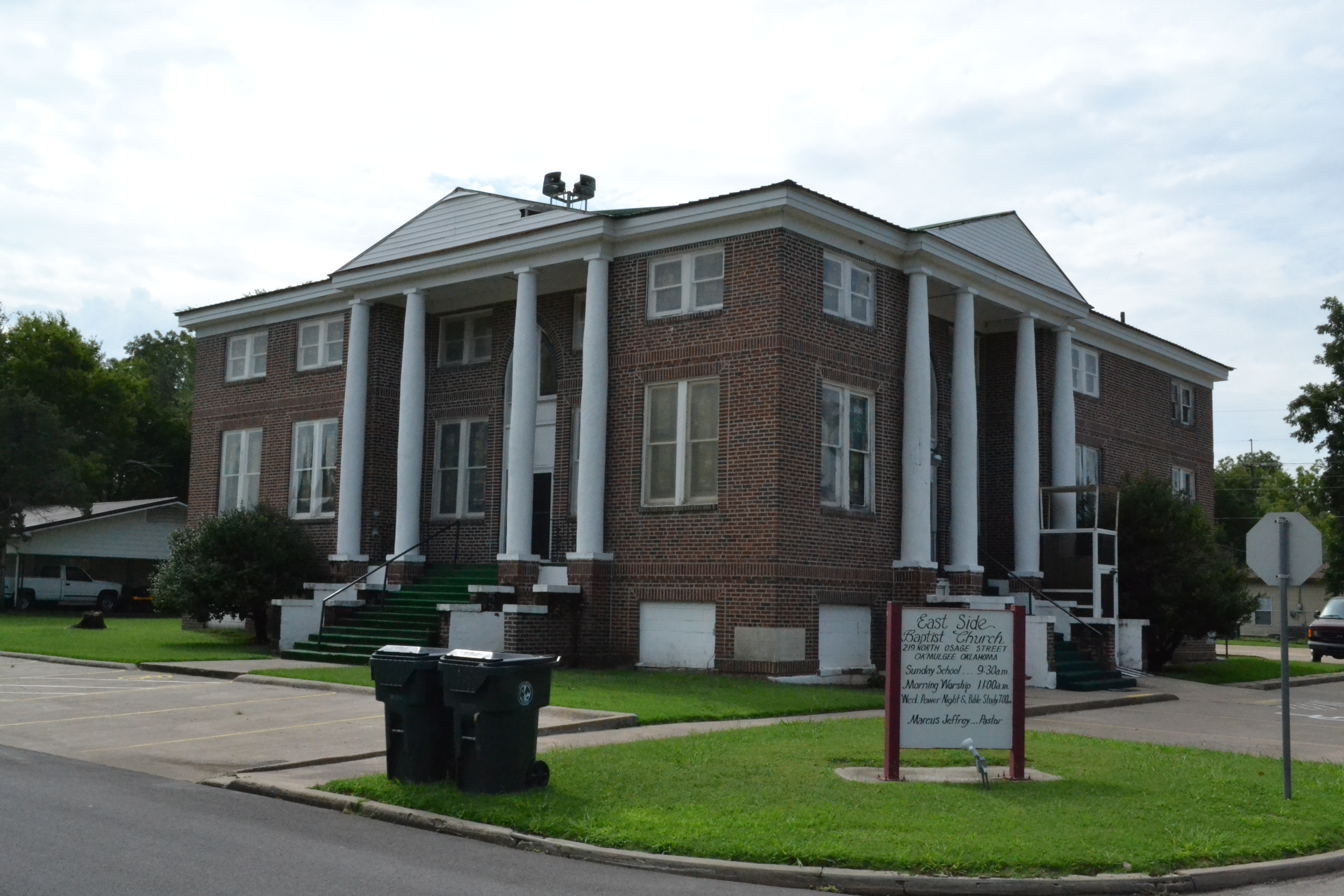

- Location within Oklahoma Location within the United States
- Location: 219 N. Osage Ave., Okmulgee, Oklahoma
- Coordinates: 35°37′33″N 95°57′30″W
- Area: less than one acre
- Built: 1921
- MPS: Black Baptist Churches in Okmulgee TR
- NRHP reference No.: 84000306
- Added to NRHP: November 23, 1984

The Eastside Baptist Church in Okmulgee, Oklahoma is a historic Baptist church located at 219 N. Osage Avenue.

It is home to a congregation established in 1903, as the Zion Bethel Church, which met at a frame residence at the location of the present church. The church was built in 1921, and was added to the National Register in 1984.

It is on the National Register of Historic Places listings in Okmulgee County, Oklahoma. The building was deemed significant as the second-oldest black church building in Okmulgee, and one of the "oldest unaltered black churches in eastern Oklahoma."
