= Sand Springs Fire Department =

Operational area
- Country: United States
- Address: 602 W Morrow Rd, Sand Springs, Oklahoma, 74063

Agency overview
- Established: 1913
- Staffing: Career
- Fire chief: Jeremy Wade
- IAFF: 2173

Facilities and equipment
- Stations: 2

Website
- Official website

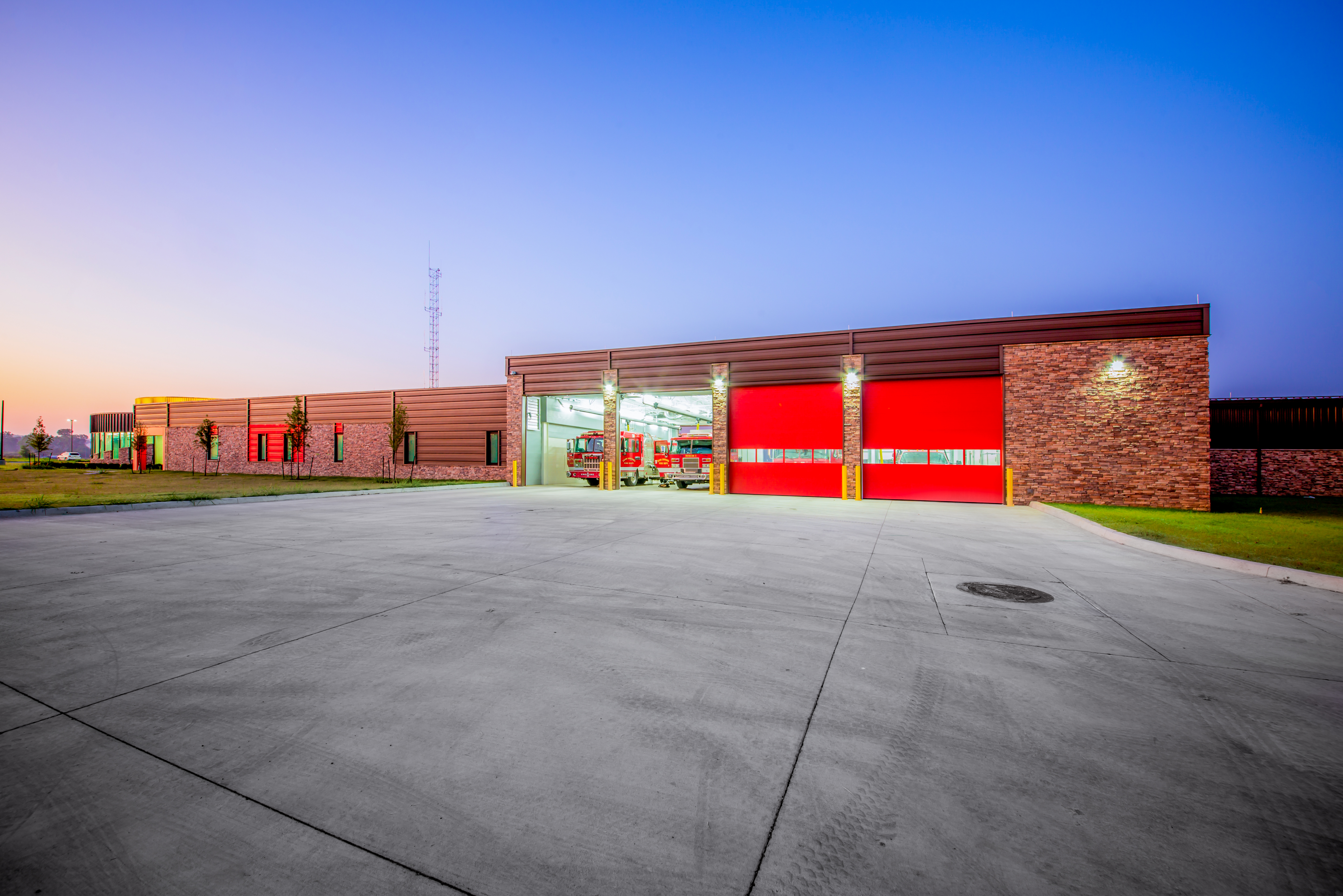
Billie A. Hall Public Safety Center

The Sand Springs Fire Department (SSFD) is a full-time fire department located in Sand Springs, Oklahoma. The Sand Springs Fire Department covers multiple communities in Tulsa, Creek, and Osage counties. The department's area of service spans approximately 64 square miles and contains approximately 40,000 residents. SSFD responds to over 3,000 calls annually from two stations.

== Early history ==
The Sand Springs Fire Department was founded in 1913. Town Marshal Robert Fleenor was elected fire chief of the Sand Springs Volunteer Fire Department. In March 1913, the Bucket Brigade was replaced with the 500 feet of fire hose purchased by the city. Charles Page donated another 500 feet of hose. Chief Fleenor had a team of horses to pull a fire wagon. The horses were used to pull the fire wagon until their stable caught fire in 1915. There are currently 33 full-time, unionized Sand Springs firefighters that are at the stations. They are always reportedly "on the line". In 1921, the Sand Springs Fire Department had one paid firefighter Chief C.G. Stricklen and nine volunteer firefighters who were paid for a response. In 1928, the fire department had three paid firefighters. In 1936, one firefighter was cut from the force when staffing was reduced to two firefighters. In 1950, the department had five full-time firefighters, and in 1957 they added two more paid firefighters bringing the number up to seven full-time and fifteen volunteers. The Sand Springs Fire Departments numbers of paid firefighters increased to twenty eight. In 1985, the last two volunteers in the department, Roy Morrison and William Forsythe retired.

== Personnel ==
The Sand Springs Fire Department consists of 33 operational personnel, as well as four administrative staff members. Administrative staff consists of a Fire Chief, Deputy Fire Chief, Fire Marshal and Administrative Assistant.

Operational personnel work a 24/48 schedule, which consists of 24 hours on-duty and 48 hours off-duty. The three shifts needed to work this schedule are designated as A, B and C Platoons.

== Facilities ==
The Billie A. Hall Public Safety Center opened for operation in 2019, located on the north side of Sand Springs. This facility houses Municipal Court, Police and Fire Department operations. The Sand Springs Fire Department portion of the facility is referred to as Fire Station #1 and contains administrative offices, a physical fitness facility, classrooms, training grounds and everything needed for the daily operation of two Fire companies.

Sand Springs Fire Department Station #2 opened for operation in 2018, located on the south side of Sand Springs. Station #2 contains everything needed for the daily operation of a single Fire company.

== Apparatus ==
Station #1, First Out: Engine 1, Ladder 1, Squad 1, Squad 3, Boat 1, UTV 1

Station #1, Reserve: Engine 12, Rescue 1, Squad 4, Boat 3

Station #2, First Out: Engine 2, Squad 2, Boat 2
