= Okmulgee Public Library =

- U.S. National Register of Historic Places
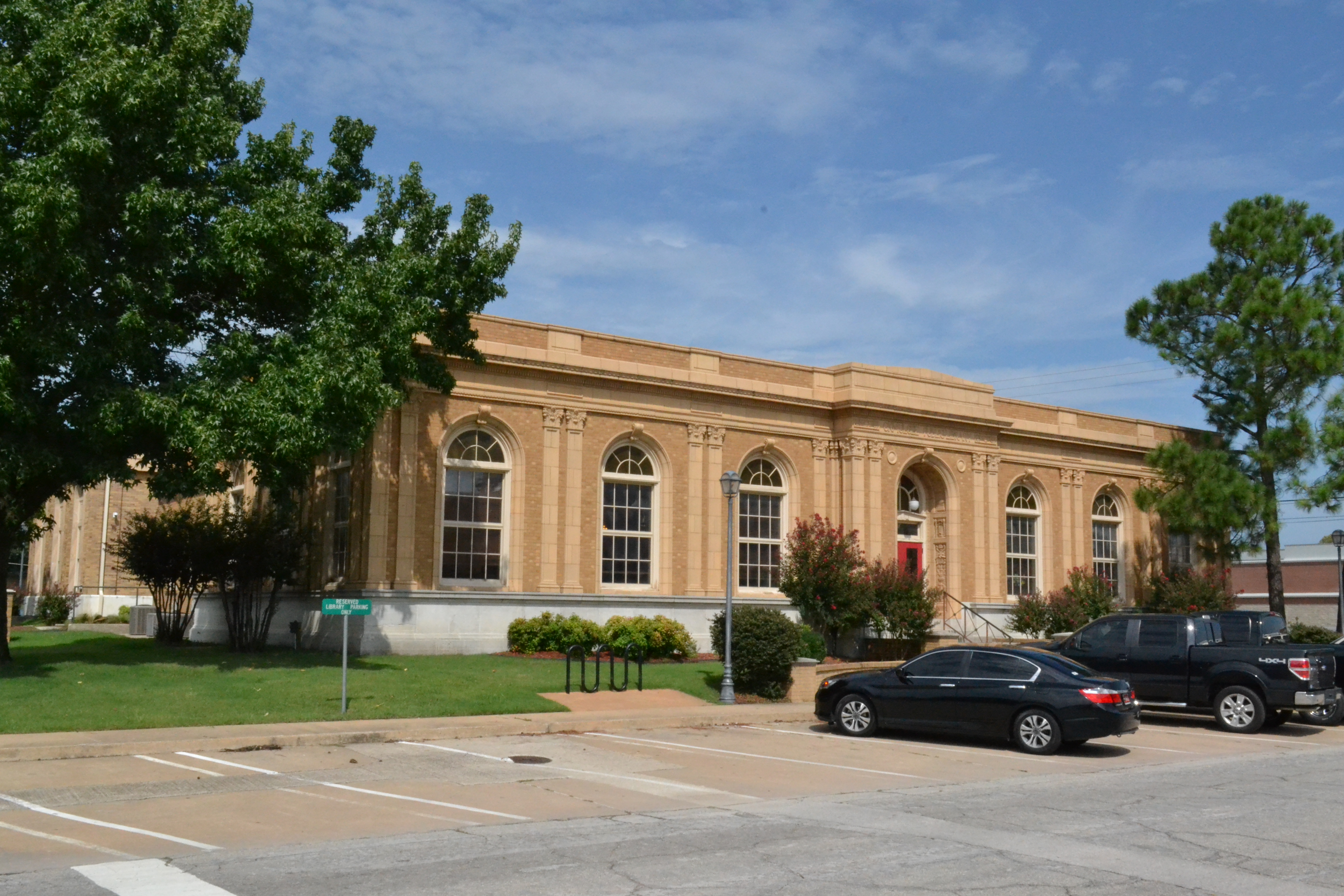
- The library in 2017

- Location within Oklahoma Location within the United States
- Location: 218 S. Okmulgee Ave., Okmulgee, Oklahoma
- Coordinates: 35°37′17″N 95°58′31″W
- Area: less than one acre
- Built: 1921
- Architect: Smith, Rea, Lovett, & Senter
- Architectural style: Colonial Revival, Georgian
- NRHP reference No.: 83002111
- Added to NRHP: July 28, 1983

The Okmulgee Public Library located at 218 S. Okmulgee Avenue in Okmulgee, Oklahoma is a functioning public library built in 1921, and listed on the National Register of Historic Places on July 28, 1983.

== History ==
The library was built on donated land, and the $75,000 cost of construction was financed by a bond issue. Building started in 1917, and was completed in 1921. It was added to the National Register of Historic Places on July 28, 1983. The structure has many Georgian Revival architectural characteristics such as the projecting pavilion with minor pediment, large compound arched windows, Corinthian-like pilasters marking corners and divisions between windows, modillioned cornice, and frieze with multiple moldings. The Library was nominated based on both historical and architectural significance, because: (1) it was the first city library in Oklahoma to be constructed with funds derived from a municipal bond issue and (2) it is the best example of Georgian Revival design in Okmulgee County.

The Library is just outside the far southwest corner of the Okmulgee Downtown Historic District, itself NRHP-listed on December 17, 1992. The building continues to function as a public library.
