= Creek National Capitol =

- U.S. National Register of Historic Places
- U.S. National Historic Landmark
- U.S. Historic district – Contributing property
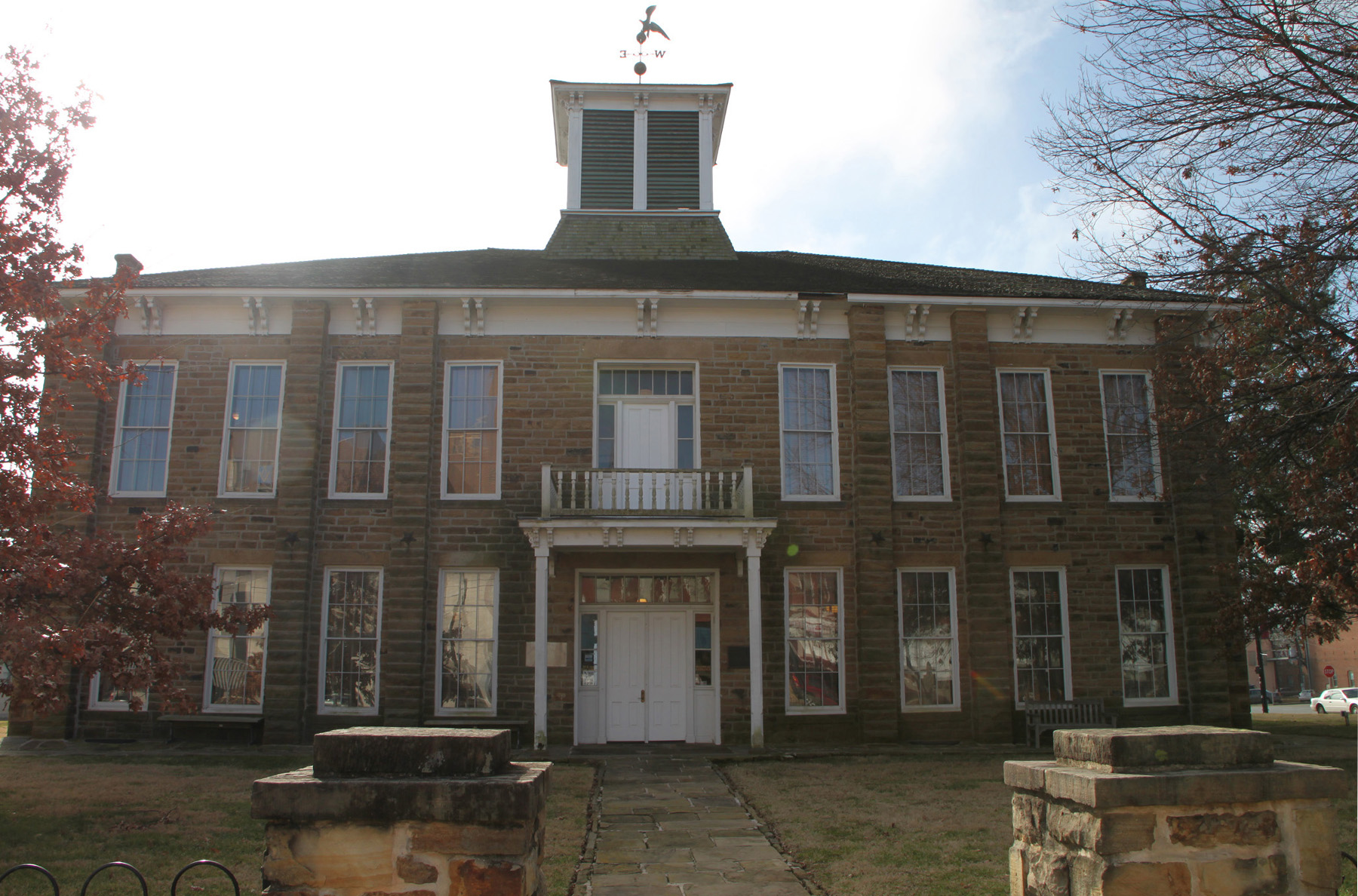

- Location within Oklahoma Location within the United States
- Location: 6th St. and Grand Ave., Okmulgee, Oklahoma
- Coordinates: 35°37′23.60″N 95°58′18.37″W
- Built: 1878
- Part of: Okmulgee Downtown Historic District (ID92001693)
- NRHP reference No.: 66000632

Significant dates
- Added to NRHP: October 15, 1966
- Designated NHL: July 4, 1961
- Designated CP: December 17, 1992

Creek National Capitol, also known as Creek Council House (Creek: Este Mvskoke Tvlwv-Vlke Ennvkvftetv-Cuko), is a building in downtown Okmulgee, Oklahoma, United States. It was the capitol of the Muscogee (Creek) Nation from 1878 until 1907. They had established their capital at Okmulgee in 1867, after the American Civil War.

After Oklahoma was admitted as a state in 1907, the Creek lost control of this building and communal territory to the United States government, by a 1908 act. It continued to lease the building to recently organized Okmulgee County, Oklahoma for its use. In 1919 the U.S. Department of the Interior, which had trust responsibility for Creek lands, sold the building and site to the city of Okmulgee.

In 1961 the building was declared a National Historic Landmark, and in 1966 it was one of the first listings on National Register of Historic Places. In November 2010 the city sold the building back to the tribe for $3.2 million. The building houses the Creek Council House Museum, featuring artifacts and exhibits about the history of the Muscogee tribe and the arts and crafts of other Native American tribes.

In 1992, it was included again on the National Register as a contributing building in the listing of the Okmulgee Downtown Historic District.

== History ==
In 1837 the majority of the Muscogee tribe members were forced to remove from their territory in the Southeast to west of the Mississippi River by the U.S. government, during what is known as the Trail of Tears. Survivors of the trek reached Indian Territory and held a meeting at the historic Creek Council Oak Tree, in an area that developed as present-day Tulsa.

During the American Civil War, tribal unity was tested as members divided over alliance with the Confederacy. Leaders had hoped to maintain neutrality, but many members fought with the Confederacy. After the war, the US required a new peace treaty to be negotiated and also required the tribe to emancipate any enslaved African Americans they held. They became known as Creek Freedmen.

In 1867 the Muscogee (Creek) Nation was established in the Indian Territory, with its governmental headquarters in the city of Okmulgee. The next year a double-log, two-story council house was constructed to conduct tribal business. On October 17, 1877, an act was passed by the council and approved by Chief Ward Coachman appropriating $10,000 for the construction of a new capitol building of stone or brick upon the site of the log council house. On January 10, 1878, the old Council House was sold for $60, with the tribe reconvening at the new Council House on September 23. The new Council House contained separate chambers for the executive and judicial branches of the government, with the legislative branch divided into the House of Kings (Mēkkvlke Encuko) and House of Warriors (Tvstvnvkvlke Encuko).

In 1906 the U.S. Congress passed the Five Civilized Tribes Act, ending national self-governance for the Muscogee Creek Nation and the other four tribes: Cherokee, Chickasaw, Choctaw and Seminole. In 1907 the Indian Territory was integrated into the state of Oklahoma.

That same year, the federal government leased the Muscogee Nation's Council House to the newly organized Okmulgee County for $2,000 a year to serve as the Okmulgee County Courthouse. This arrangement continued until 1917. In 1908 the U.S. Congress authorized the Secretary of the Interior to "take possession of all lands belonging to the Five Civilized Tribes, now or heretofore used for government, school, or other tribal purposes...".

In 1919 the City of Okmulgee purchased the Creek Council House and its grounds for $100,000, under the supervision of the Department of the Interior. The sale proceeds were deposited in the U.S. Treasury in the name of the tribe. In the 1920s the City of Okmulgee heard proposals for the Council House either to be torn down or adapted as a private hotel. This redevelopment was ended after popular entertainer Will Rogers (Cherokee) visited the city and called for the Council House to be preserved, appealing to supporters of this view.

On April 24, 1923, activists founded the Creek Indian Memorial Association (CIMA) to protect the historical monuments of the Muscogee tribe. In 1934 the Oklahoma Indian Welfare Act was passed to help the tribes regain their sovereign status. (This was during the administration of President Franklin D. Roosevelt, when federal legislation had authorized tribes to restore self-government.) From the 1930s into 1960s, the City of Okmulgee used the Creek Council House variously as a sheriff's office, a Boy Scout meeting room, and a YMCA.

In 1961 the Council House and the grounds around it were listed on the National Register of Historic Places; it was designated as a National Historic Landmark, of great significance. In 1970 Congress passed legislation authorizing the Five Tribes to democratically elect their chiefs.

In 1971 the Muscogee (Creek) Nation elected Claude Cox as chief. In 1979 the Muscogee (Creek) Nation adopted a new constitution to replace the one from 1867, and established a representative self-government. The tribal government was restructured to have executive, legislative, and judicial branches. They also created departments for education and health. As they reorganized, they identified land for sites for construction of tribal governmental buildings.

In 1989 the CIMA raised $1 million to restore the Creek Council House for use as a museum. They gained non-profit, 501-C-3 tax exempt status for their organization and such use. In 1992 the restoration of the Council House was completed, and the building was opened as a history museum of the Muscogee Nation.

In 1993 the Creek Council House Museum received the National Preservation Honor Award from the National Trust for Historic Preservation for this restoration. In 1997 the City of Okmulgee agreed to pay the CIMA $149,650 annually to operate the museum.

In 2005 the CIMA changed its name to The Creek Council House Museum Association. In August 2010, after several months of negotiations, the City of Okmulgee agreed to sell the Council House back to the Muscogee (Creek) Nation for $3.2 million. Two months later, a ceremony was held to commemorate the Muscogee Nation's regaining ownership of their former capitol.
