= First Baptist Central Church =

Historic church in Oklahoma, United States

- U.S. National Register of Historic Places
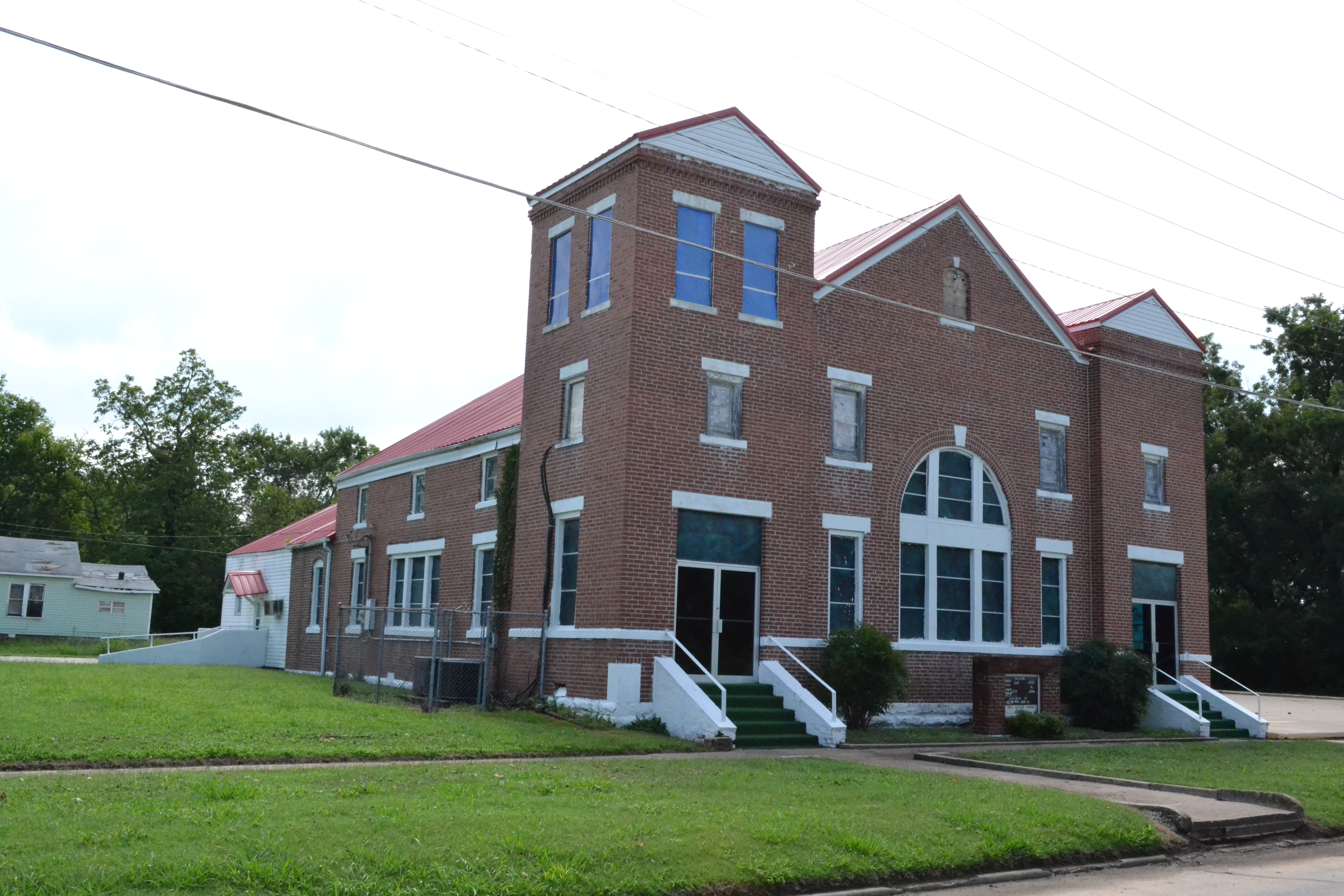

- Location within Oklahoma Location within the United States
- Location: 521 N. Central Ave., Okmulgee, Oklahoma
- Coordinates: 35°37′39″N 95°58′11″W
- Area: less than one acre
- Built: 1915
- MPS: Black Baptist Churches in Okmulgee TR
- NRHP reference No.: 84000307
- Added to NRHP: November 23, 1984

The First Baptist Central Church in Okmulgee, Oklahoma is a historic Baptist church at 521 N. Central Avenue. It was built in 1915 and added to the National Register in 1984.

It is 45 by 55 feet (14 m × 17 m) in plan.

Its NRHP nomination states:

The First Baptist Central Church is historically significant because: (1) it is the oldest black church building in Okmulgee having served the community for more than 68 years, (2) it is one of the oldest remaining properties of any type located within the black residential area of Okmulgee which once had the largest black community in Oklahoma outside of Tulsa, Oklahoma City, and Muskogee, and (3) it is among the oldest remaining black Baptist churches in eastern Oklahoma. / Built in 1915, the First Baptist Central evolved from the oldest black congregation in Okmulgee, the New Hope Baptist group, organized in 1892. Because of increased membership, the congregation outgrew its original structure and the present church was completed in 1915 as the first brick church for blacks in Okmulgee. Church membership has fluctuated over the years at approximately 200-250 making it one of the largest all-black congregations in eastern Oklahoma. For more than 68 years, First Baptist' Central has served the black community of Okmulgee by providing a place of worship and a social outlet for blacks during an era when racial separatism prevailed in Oklahoma.
