= Okmulgee Downtown Historic District =

Historic district in Oklahoma, United States

- U.S. National Register of Historic Places
- U.S. Historic district
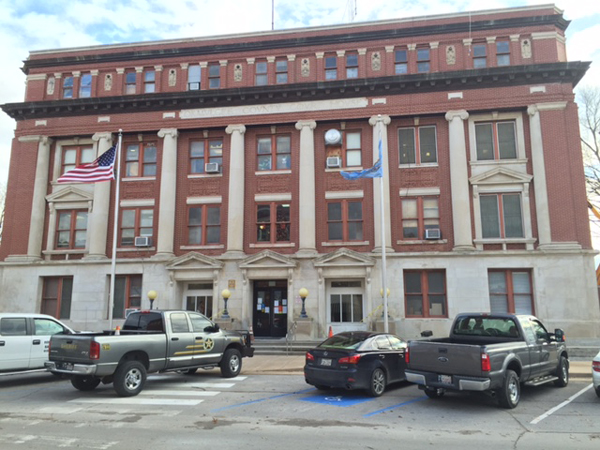
- Okmulgee Court House

- Location within Oklahoma Location within the United States
- Location: Roughly bounded by 4th St., Frisco Ave., 8th St. and Okmulgee Ave., Okmulgee, Oklahoma
- Area: 84.5 acres (34.2 ha)
- Built: 1878
- Architect: Leon B. Senter; Smith & Senter; Smith, Rea, Lovitt and Senter
- Architectural style: Chicago, Late Victorian, The Commercial Style
- NRHP reference No.: 92001693
- Added to NRHP: December 17, 1992

The Okmulgee Downtown Historic District is the original downtown area of Okmulgee, Oklahoma, roughly bounded by 4th Street, 8th Street, Okmulgee Avenue, and the Frisco tracks. It was added to the National Register of Historic Places on December 17, 1992.

== History ==
The district comprises 41 blocks, 9 of which were identified in a Phase I survey, and 32 in a Phase 2 survey, both conducted in 1990. The district includes 151 contributing structures, while many of the remaining 46 structures could be contributing if intrusive sheeting elements were to be removed. The buildings range from the Creek National Capitol, built in 1878, to the five- to eight-story buildings constructed during the late 1910s and the 1920s of the oil boom. The predominant architectural style of the district is Early Commercial, but some other represented styles are Renaissance Revival, Richardsonian Romanesque, Italian Renaissance Revival, Second Renaissance Revival, Spanish Colonial Revival, Neoclassical Revival, Beaux Arts, Italianate, and Art Deco. The district includes the predominantly African-American commercial area which built up on 5th & 6th Streets.

The Okmulgee Historic Preservation Commission was established in 1988 as part of that Historic Preservation Ordinance passed by the town's City Council to provide protection to the district. The Commission oversees architectural changes within the area.

At least one subsequent architectural survey has identified other districts and structures in Okmulgee which might qualify for historical listing, but no action has been taken.

Selected buildings within the district include:

- Selfridge Flats, 321 E. 7th
- Walker Apartments, at 220 S. Porter
- a brick apartment building at 207 W. 8th
- a boarding house, once used as a railroad hotel (noncontributing)
- Severs Block, 101 E. 6th Street, separately listed on the National Register in 1991
- building at 104 S. Morton
- Parkinson-Trent Company Building, 100 S. Morton
- old Okmulgee City Hall, 115 N. Morton
- Salvation Army Citadel, 213 S. Grand
- Creek National Capitol, Italianate in style, separately NRHP-listed and a National Historic Landmark
- McCulloch Building, 108-114 N. Grand
- Cook/Orpheum Theater, 210 W. 7th
- Bank of Commerce, 110 E. 6th St., Neoclassical Revival-style
- Christian Church, 211 W. 8th Street, Late Gothic Revival-style
- Commerce Building, 117-121 S. Grand, Beaux Arts-style
- Okmulgee County Courthouse, separately NRHP-listed in 1984
