= Hall church =

Type of church building

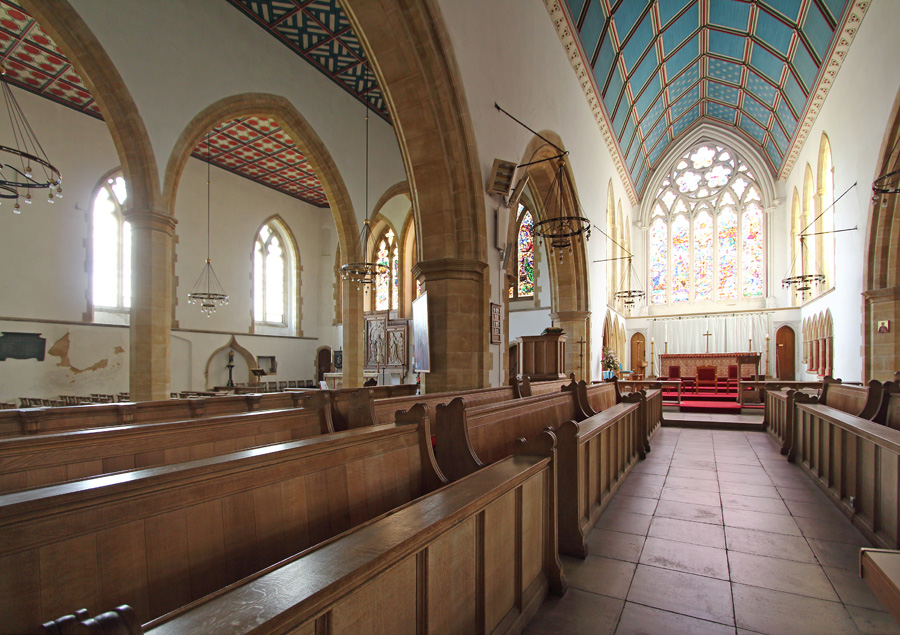
Great Yarmouth Minster

A hall church is a church with a nave and aisles of approximately equal height. In England, Flanders and the Netherlands, it is covered by parallel roofs, typically, one for each vessel, but in Germany, there is often one single immense roof. The term was invented in the mid-19th century by Wilhelm Lübke, a pioneering German art historian. In contrast to an architectural basilica, where the nave is lit from above by the clerestory, a hall church is lit by the windows of the side walls typically spanning almost the full height of the interior.

== Terms ==
In the English language, there are two problems of terminology with respect to hall churches:

- The term hall church is ambiguous because the term hall is ambiguous. In some cases, the church of a manor house ("hall") is called a hall church. The term is also used for large aisleless churches, an entirely different type. Aisleless churches with a rectangular plan are called zaalkerk in Dutch and Saalkirche in German, zaal/Saal, derived from French salle, marking large rooms of less extent than hal/Halle.
- The obligatory distinction between nave and aisle, which does not exist in other European languages, is inappropriate for many hall churches. In Dutch the schip ('ship', entire nave) can consist of two, three or more parallel beuken (lit. 'bellies'), and the koor ('choir, chancel') can do as well.

== History ==
The first churches with naves and aisles of equal height were crypts. The first aisled hall church north of the Alps is St Bartholomew's Chapel (German: Bartholomäuskapelle) at Paderborn, consecrated c. 1017. In western France, there are some Romanesque hall churches with parallel barrel vaults. Poitiers Cathedral is considered to be the first Gothic hall church, and was probably an example for the Gothic hall churches of Westphalia. Most familiar was the construction of aisled hall churches in the late Gothic period, most notably in the areas of Westphalia and upper Saxony.

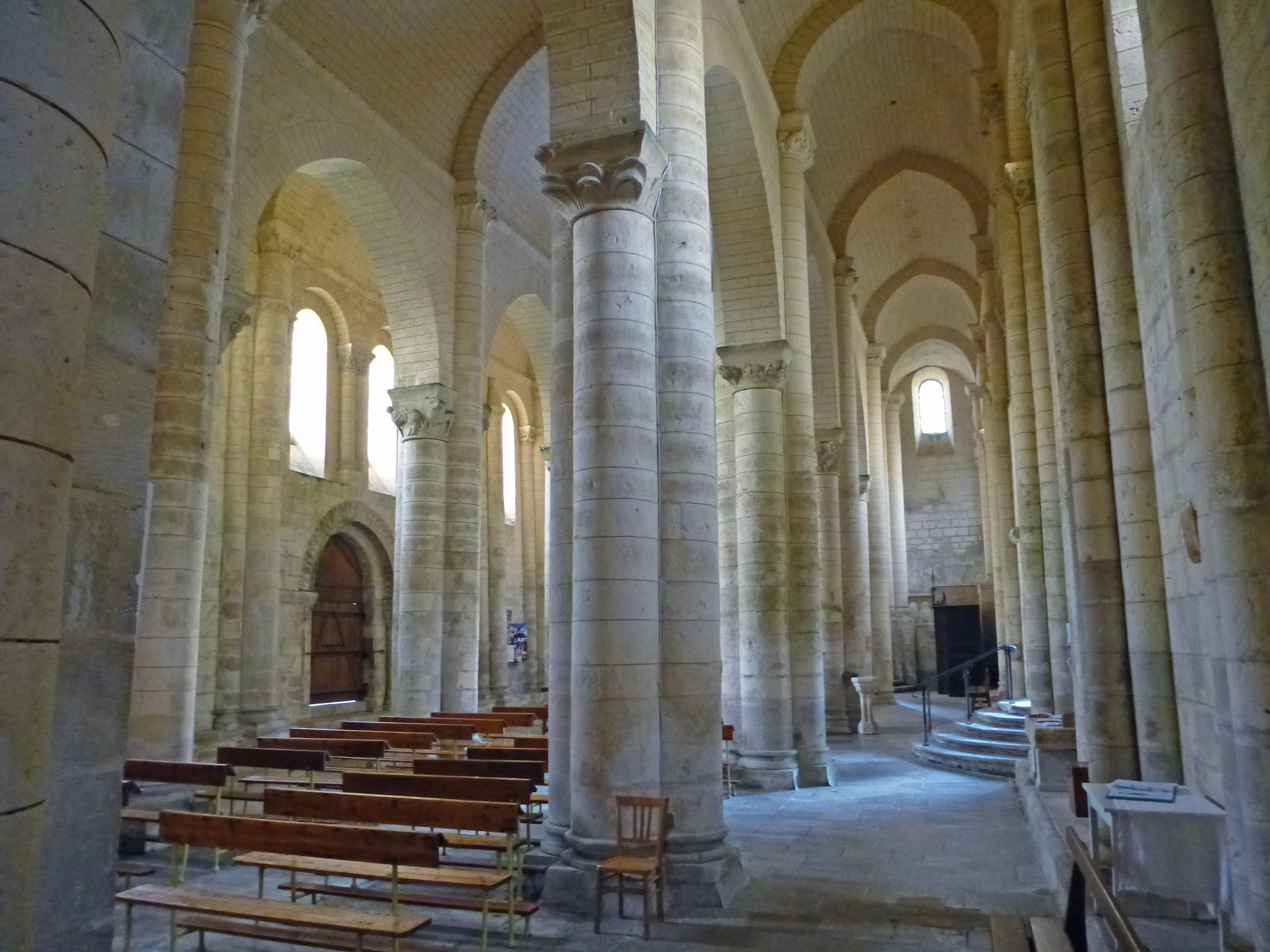
St-Hilaire [fr], Melle, Romanesque barrel vaults

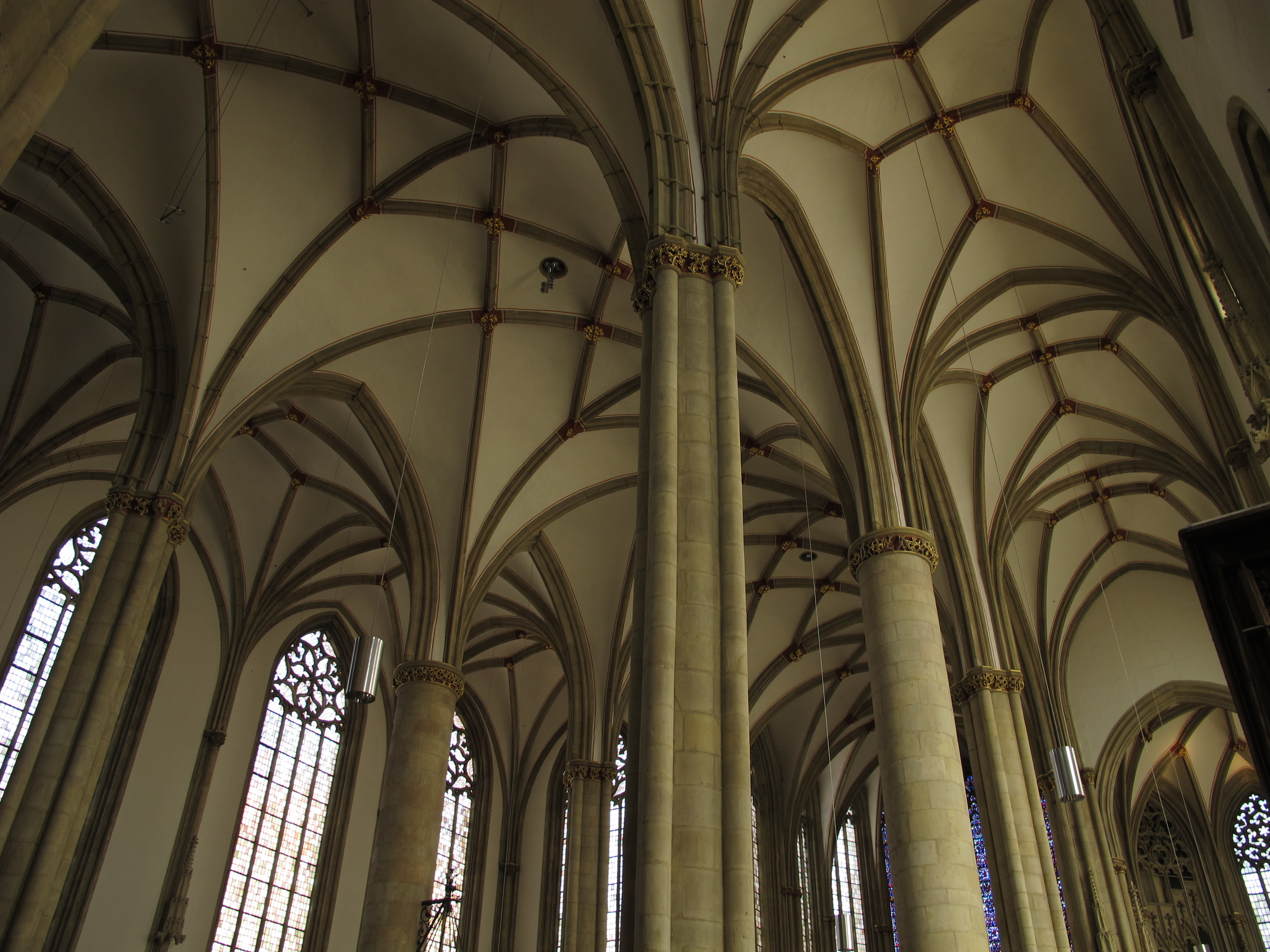
St. Lambert's Church, Münster

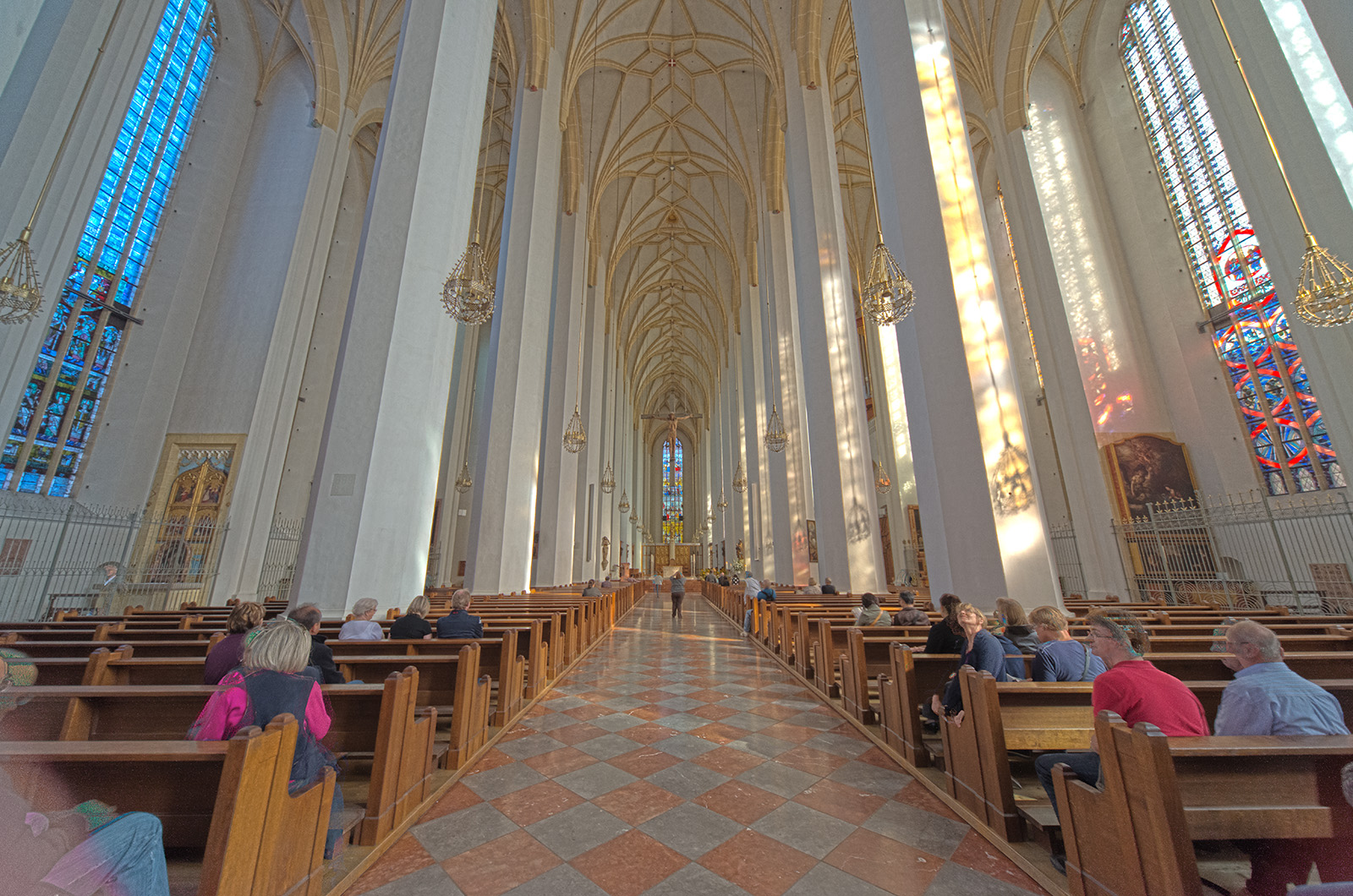
Frauenkirche, Munich, a hall of three naves with lateral extensions

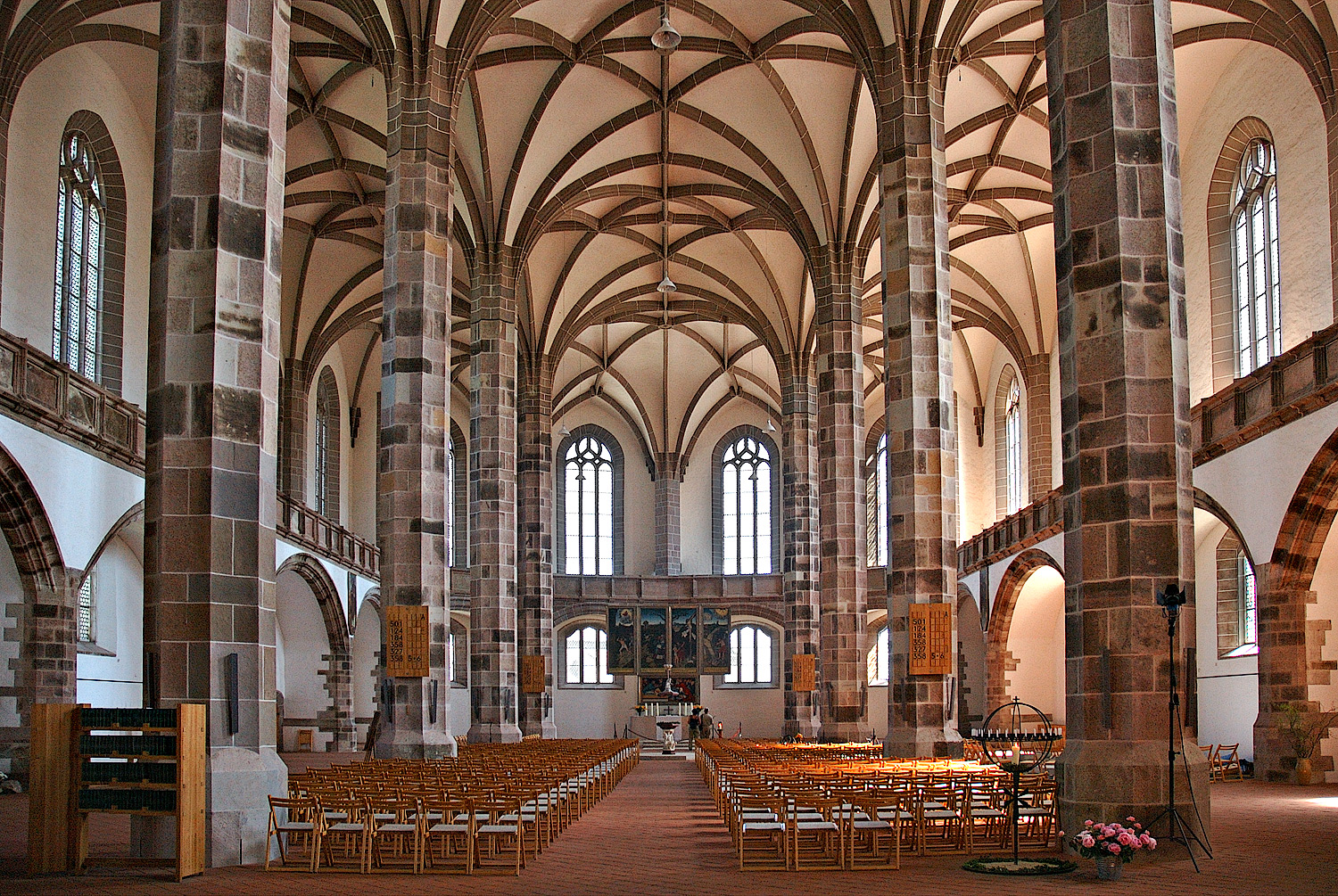
St. Wolfgang's Church, Schneeberg

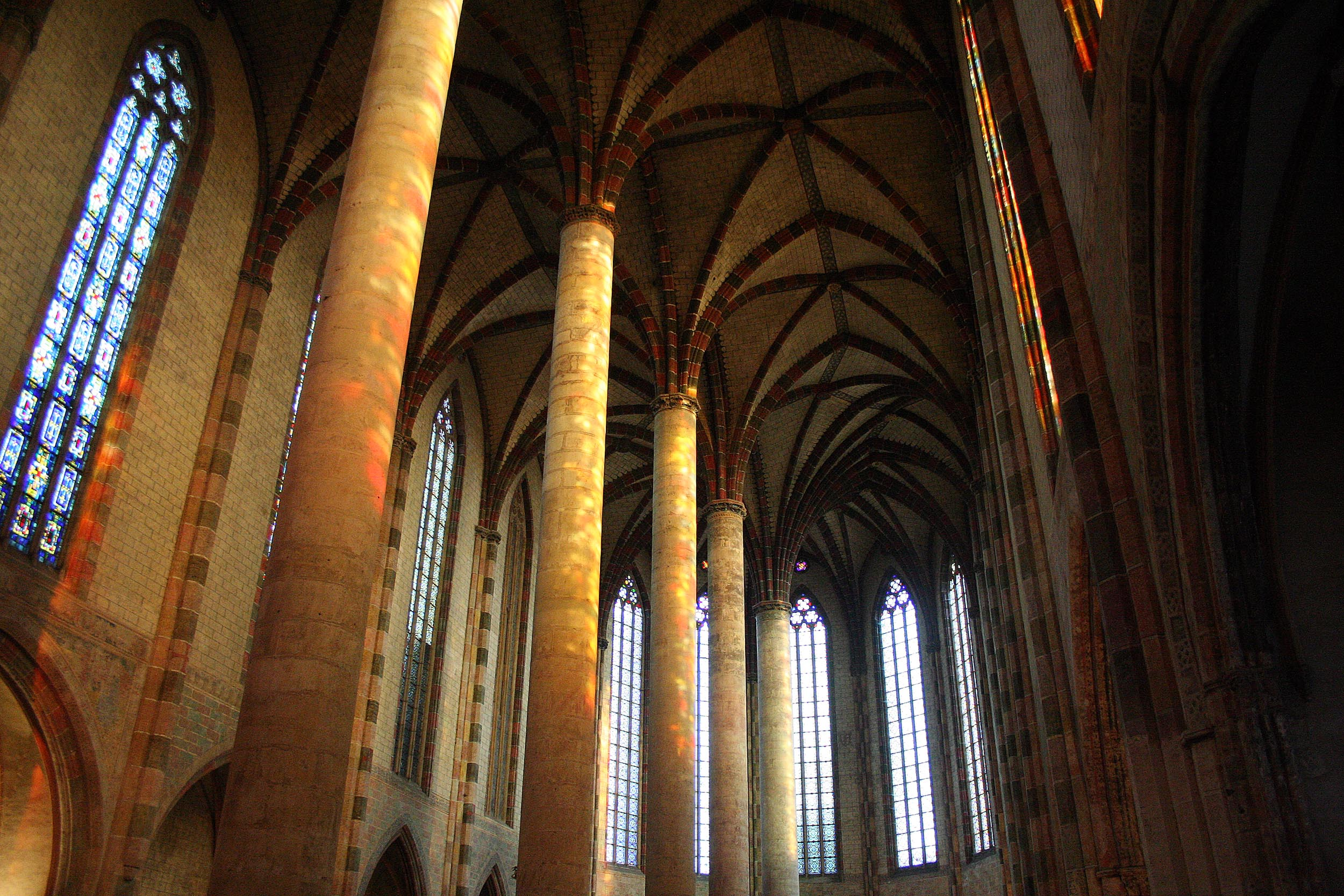
Church of the Jacobins, Toulouse, a twin-naved hall church

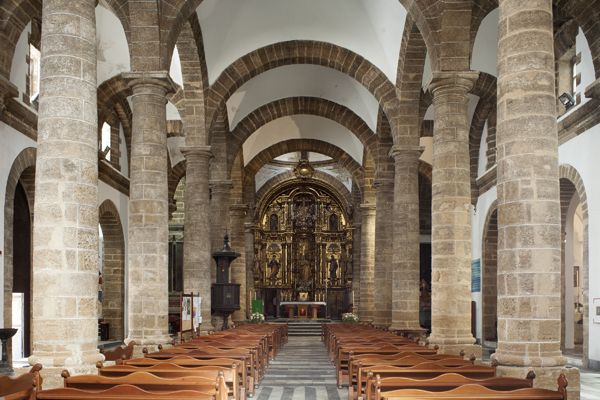
Church of the Holy Cross (Cádiz), the southernmost hall church in continental Europe

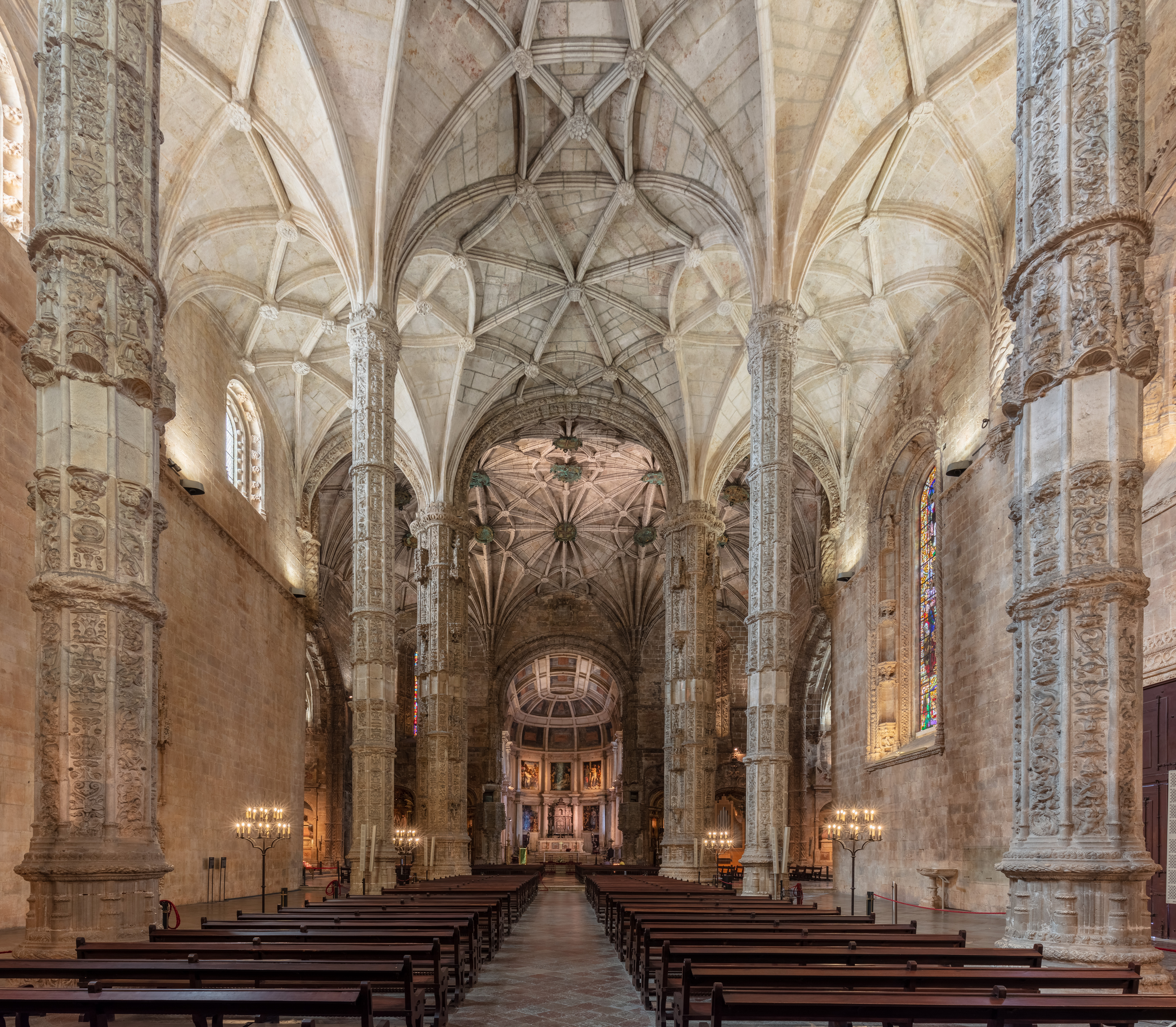
Jerónimos Monastery, Belém (Lisbon), in the Manueline style

St. Anne's Church, Annaberg, Sondergotik vaults

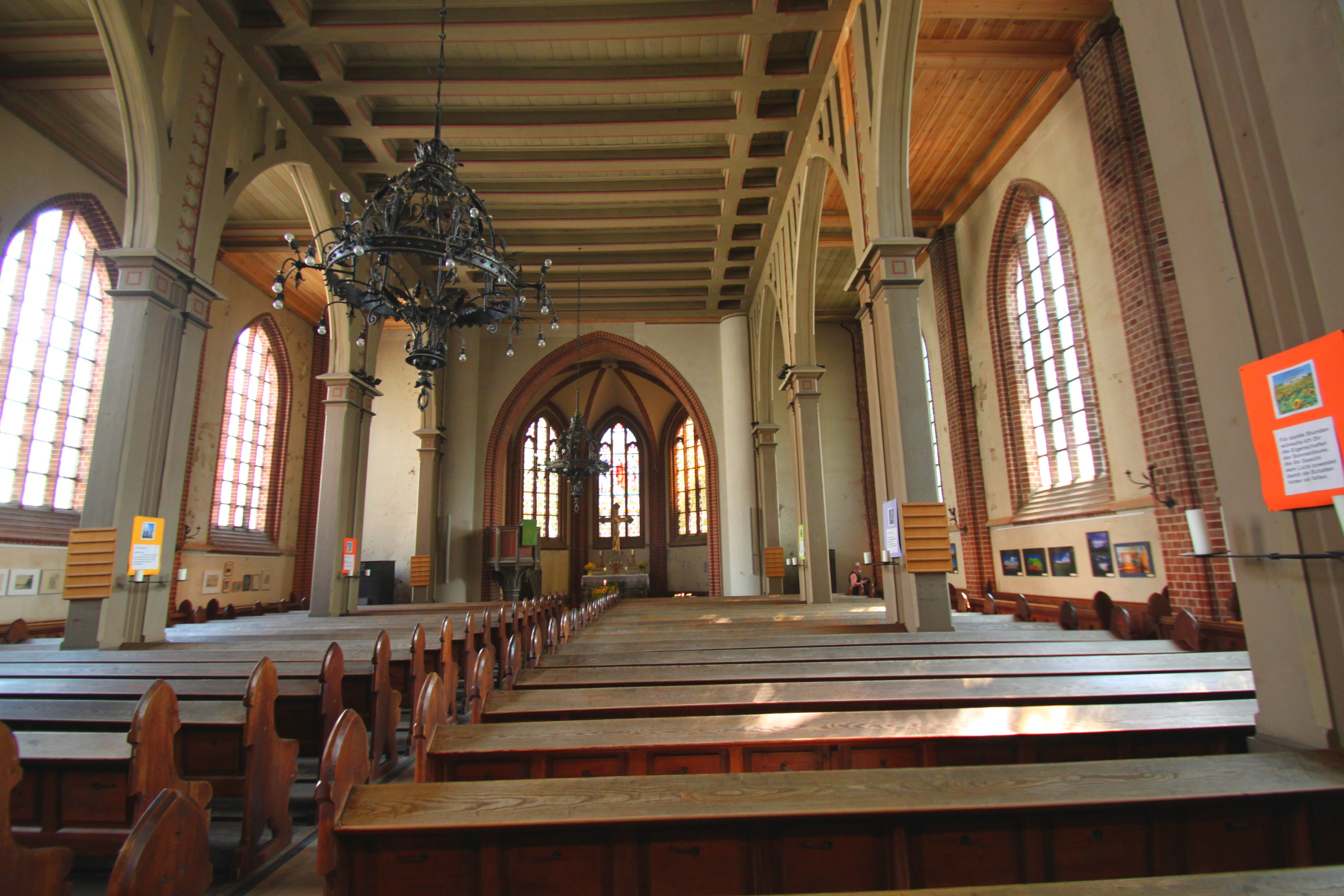
St Mary's [de], Usedom, with wooden arches and a wooden ceiling

In the Netherlands and Flanders, most hall churches have no stone vaults under one longitudinal roof, as is typical in Germany, but wooden barrel vaults with separate longitudinal roofs over each nave or aisle. In England, there are more than a thousand aisled hall churches with wooden barrel or waggon roofs, as well as other kinds of ceilings (see Commons:Category:Hall churches in England by county), though official descriptions do not use the term hall church. In German literature on English medieval architecture, they are mentioned as a frequent type peripherally.

In Devon, more than 200 churches (or a part of a church) are such aisled halls, forming the majority of all church buildings there. In parts of Wales, two-vessel halls are a traditional type of church, as mentioned using terms like "typical two naves" in descriptions by Cadw. In Scotland, some aisled hall churches are Neoclassical buildings, and some aisled Gothic Revival hall churches have been built there transferring medieval English forms.

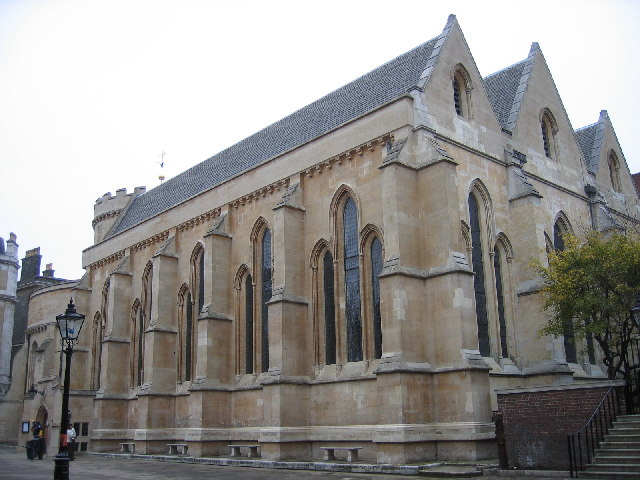
Temple Church, London

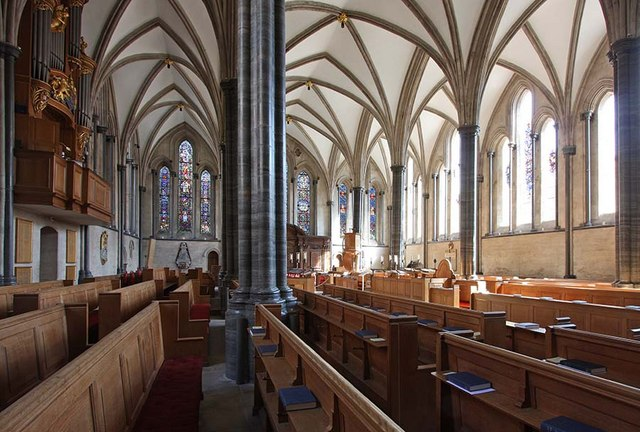
Temple Church, aisled hall 1240

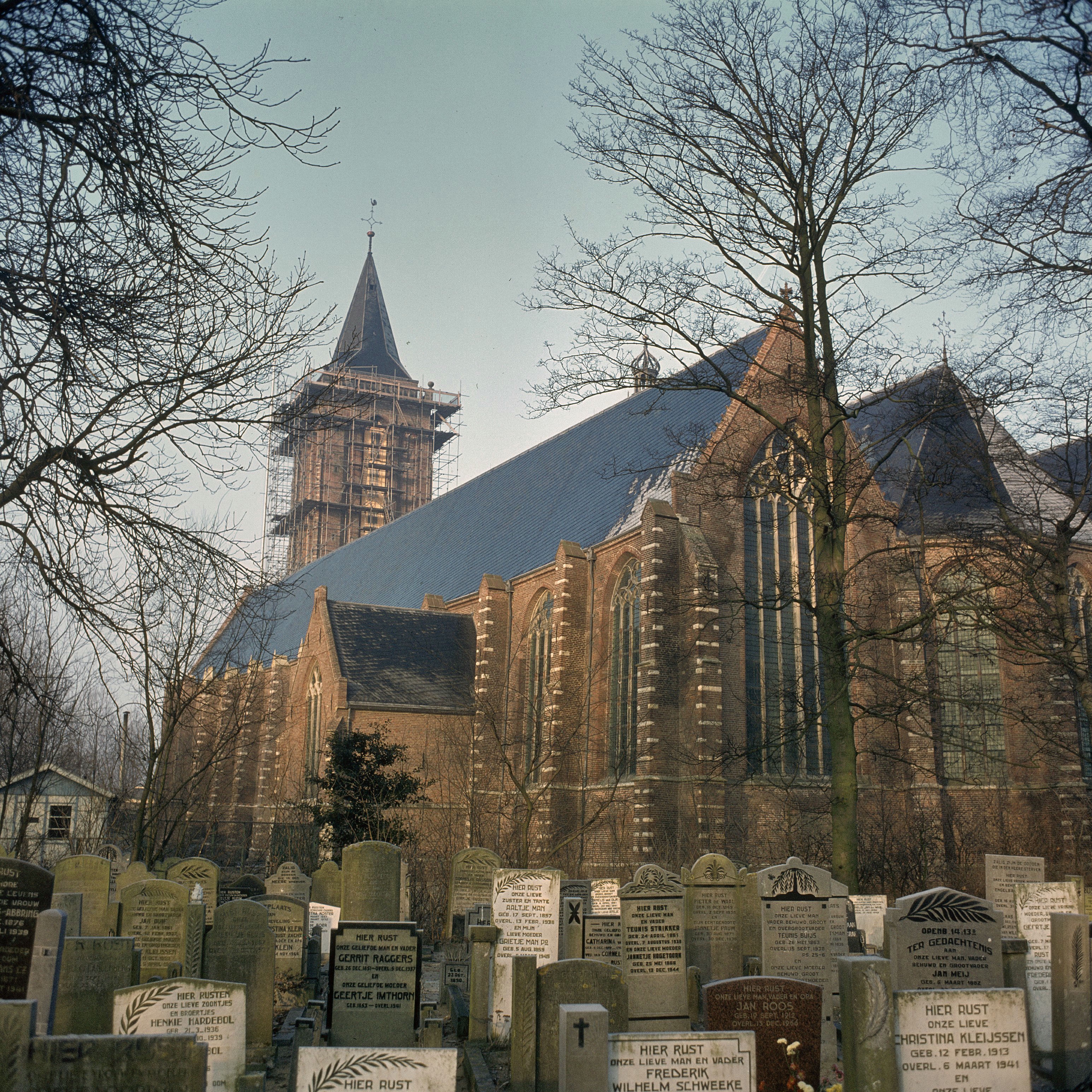
St Nicholas, Monnickendam, NL

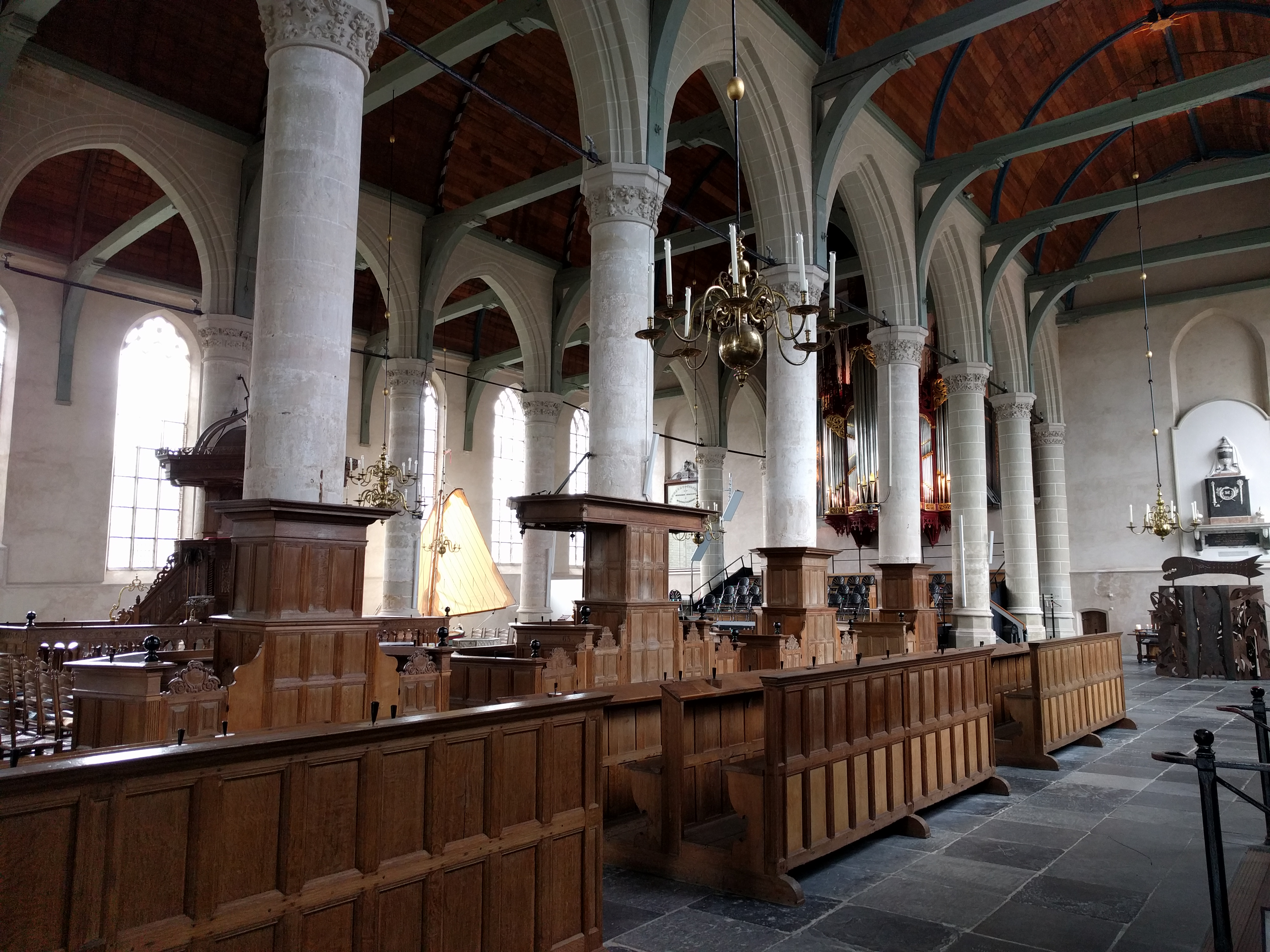
St Nicholas, Monnickendam, North Holland, aisles C16

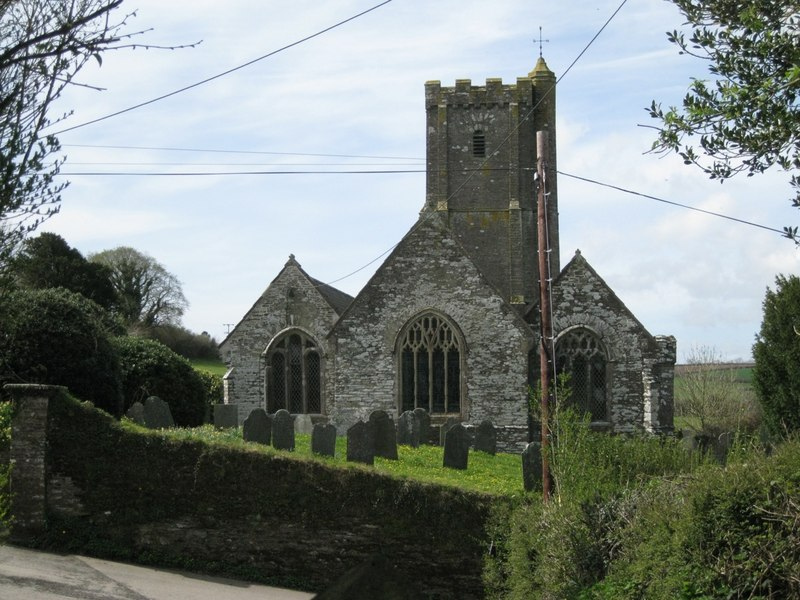
St Andrew's, East Allington, Devon

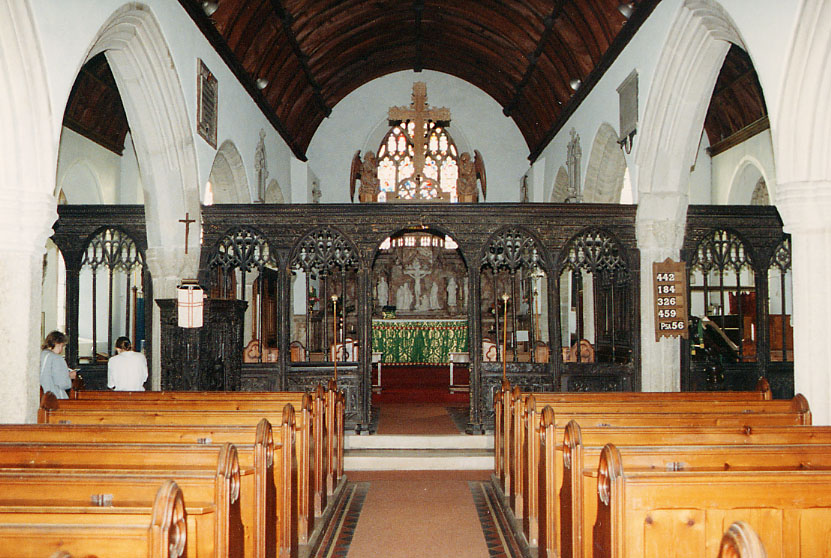
St Andrew's, East Allington, aisles C14 and C16

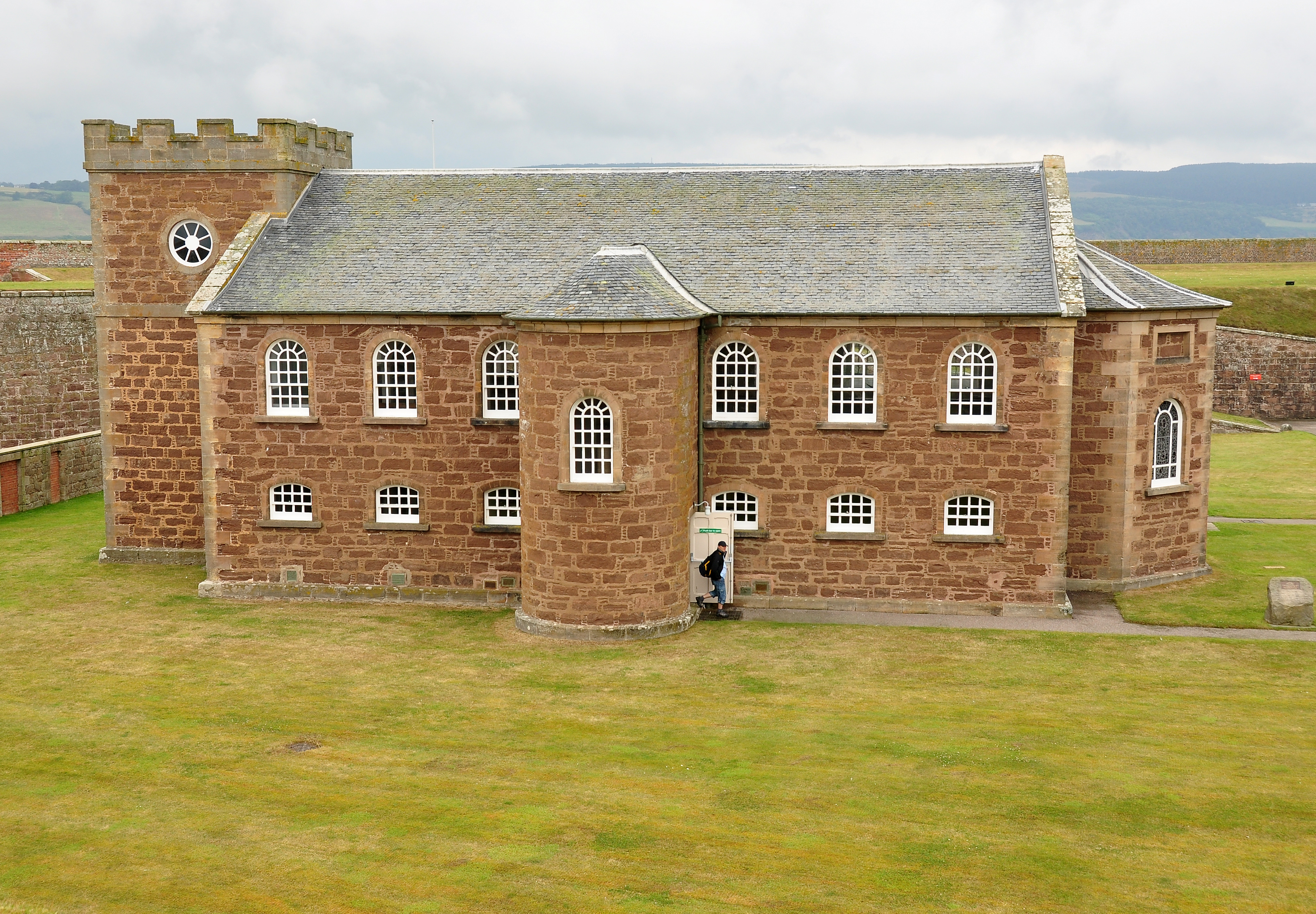
Fort George, Highland Council Area, Chapel 1716

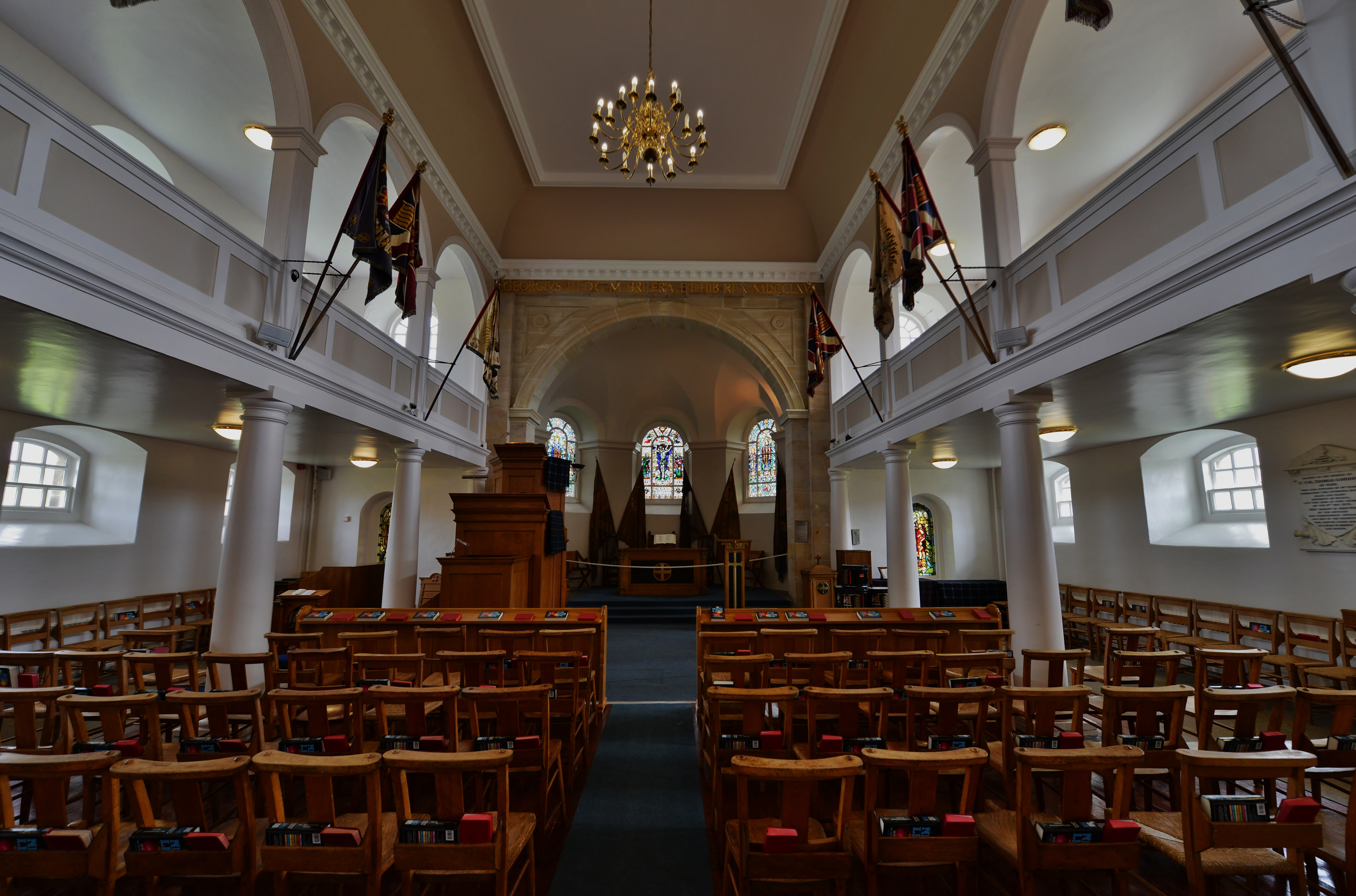
Fort George Chapel, flat ceilings at almost equal levels

There are also English hall churches vaulted with stone, such as Temple Church in London, the choir of Bristol Cathedral and the Lady Chapel of Salisbury Cathedral.

Some Gothic Revival churches apply the hall church model, particularly those following German architectural precedents. One example of a neo-Gothic hall church is St. Francis de Sales Church in Saint Louis, Missouri, designed by Viktor Klutho and completed in 1908.

A completely separate 20th-century usage employs the term hall church to mean a multi-purpose building with moveable seats rather than pews and a chancel area which can be screened off, to allow for use as a community centre during the week. That was particularly popular in Britain in inner-city areas from the 1960s onwards.

== Principles and variations ==
Here are some typical forms of hall churches and how to distinguish them from basilicas:

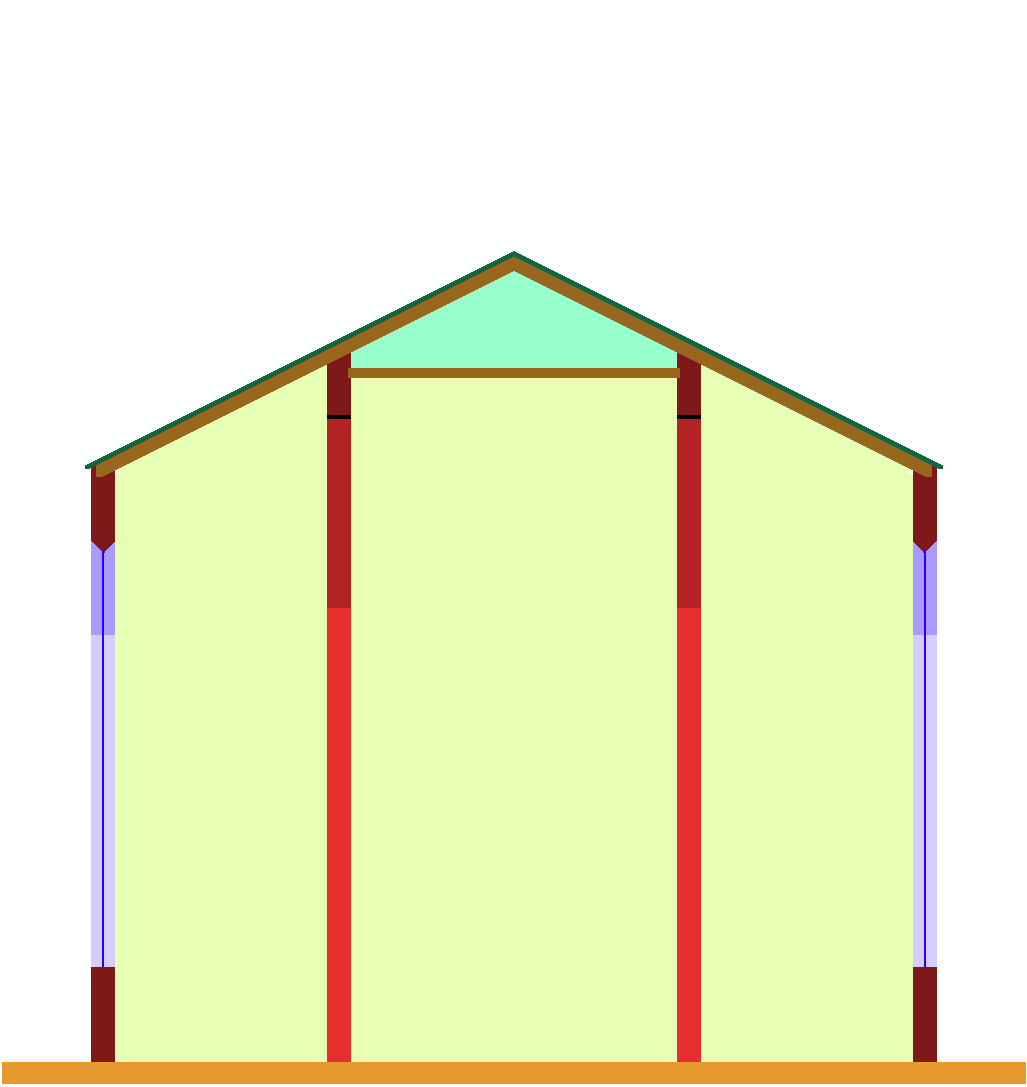
Hall church with arcades but no vaults and a partly horizontal, partly sloping ceiling

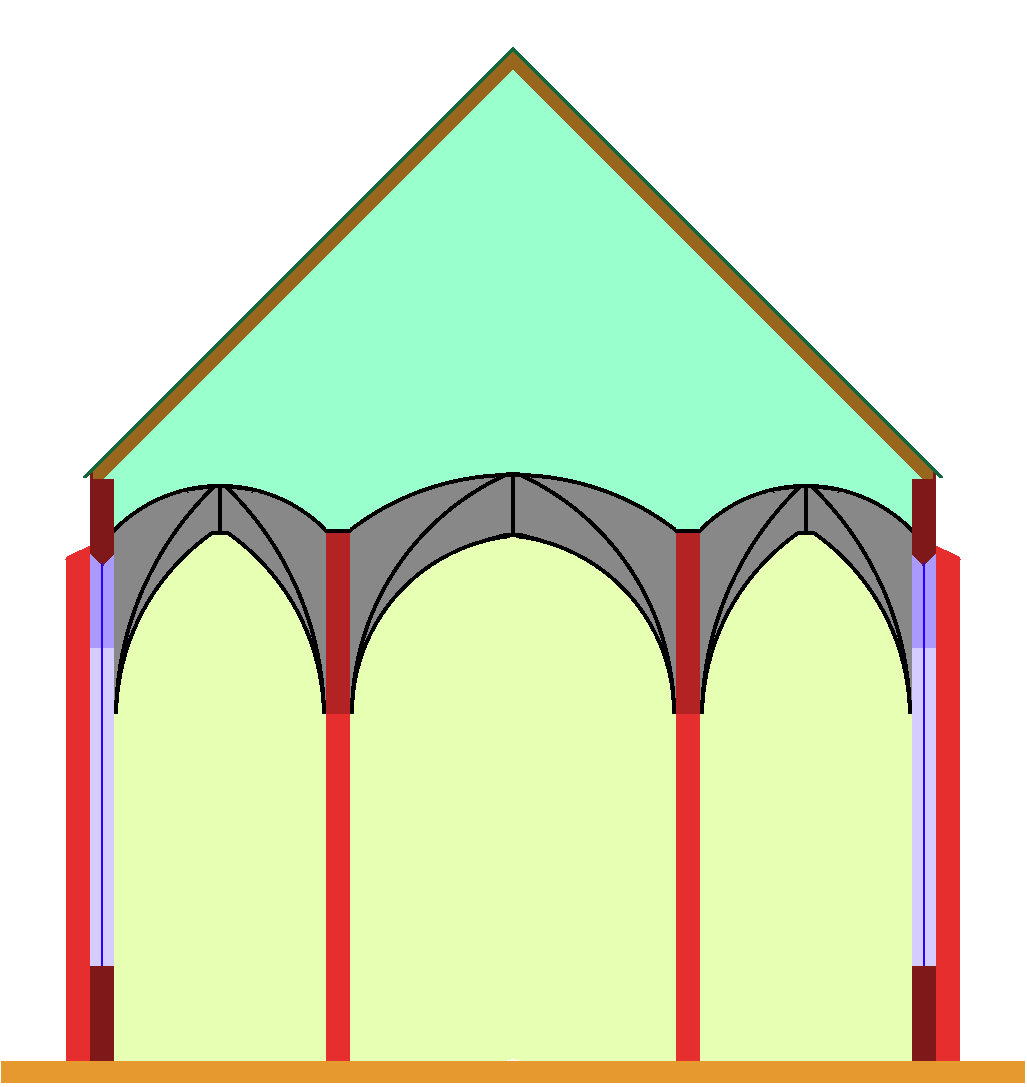
Hall church. Instead of one longitudinal roof, it may have several roofs, either longitudinal or transverse.

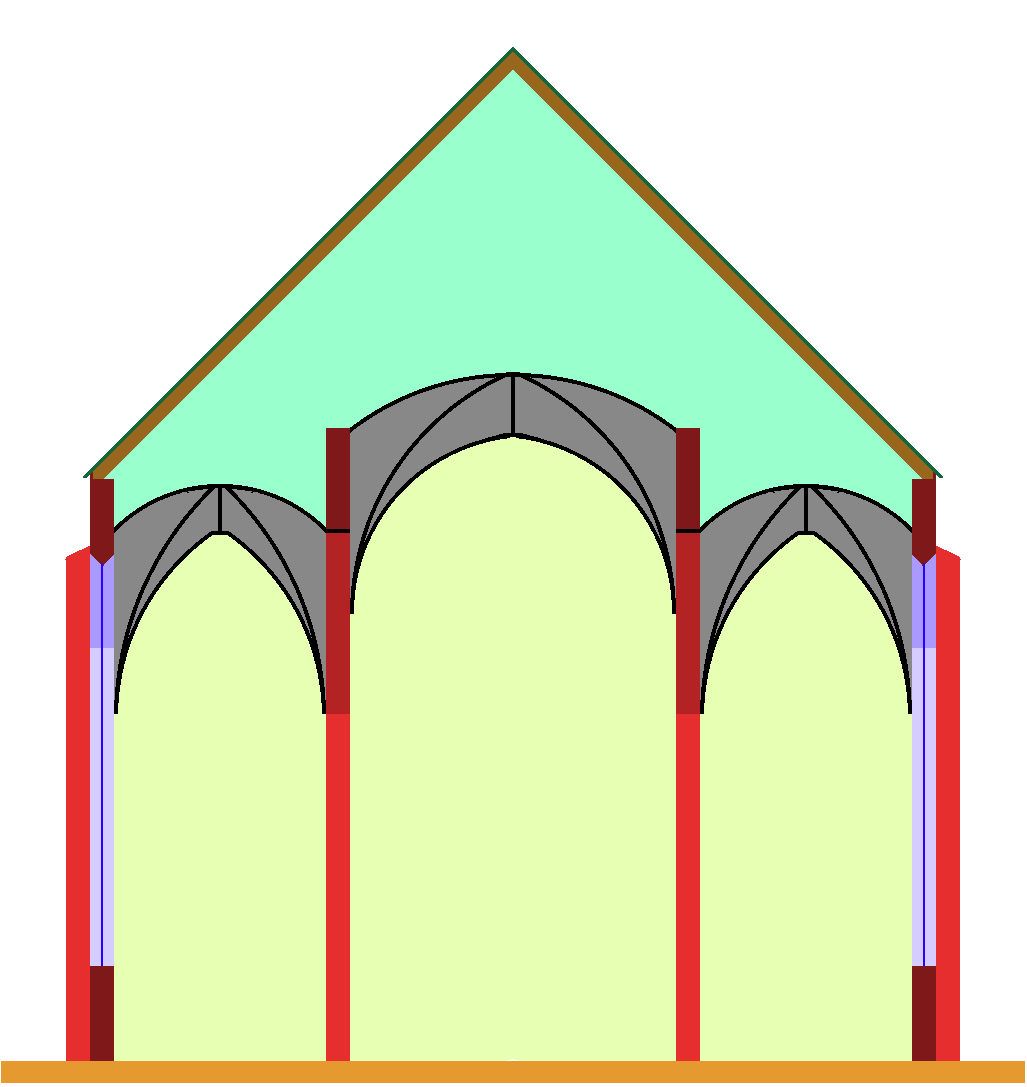
Stepped hall, the vaults of the central nave have a slightly higher springing point than those of the lateral aisles.

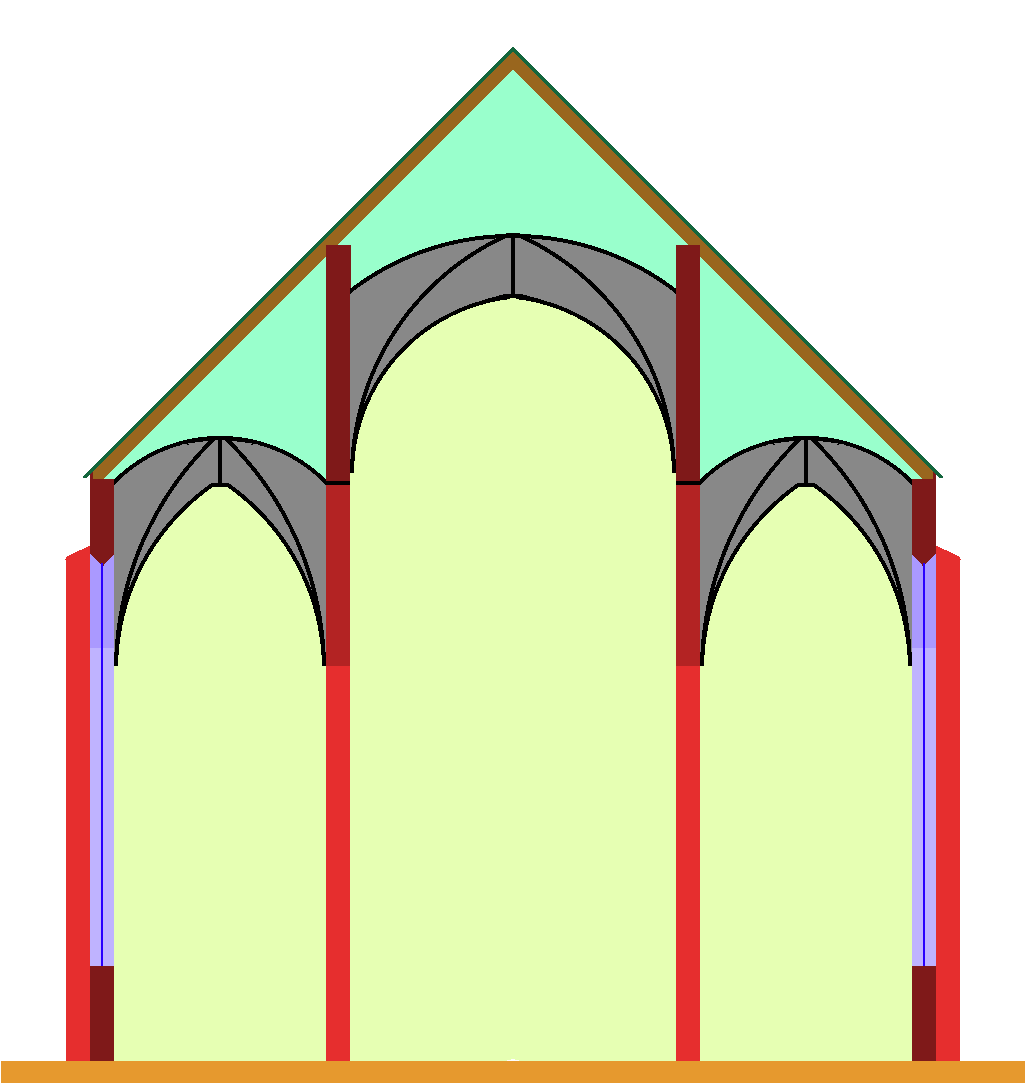
Pseudo-basilica, the central nave extends to an additional storey, but it has no upper windows.

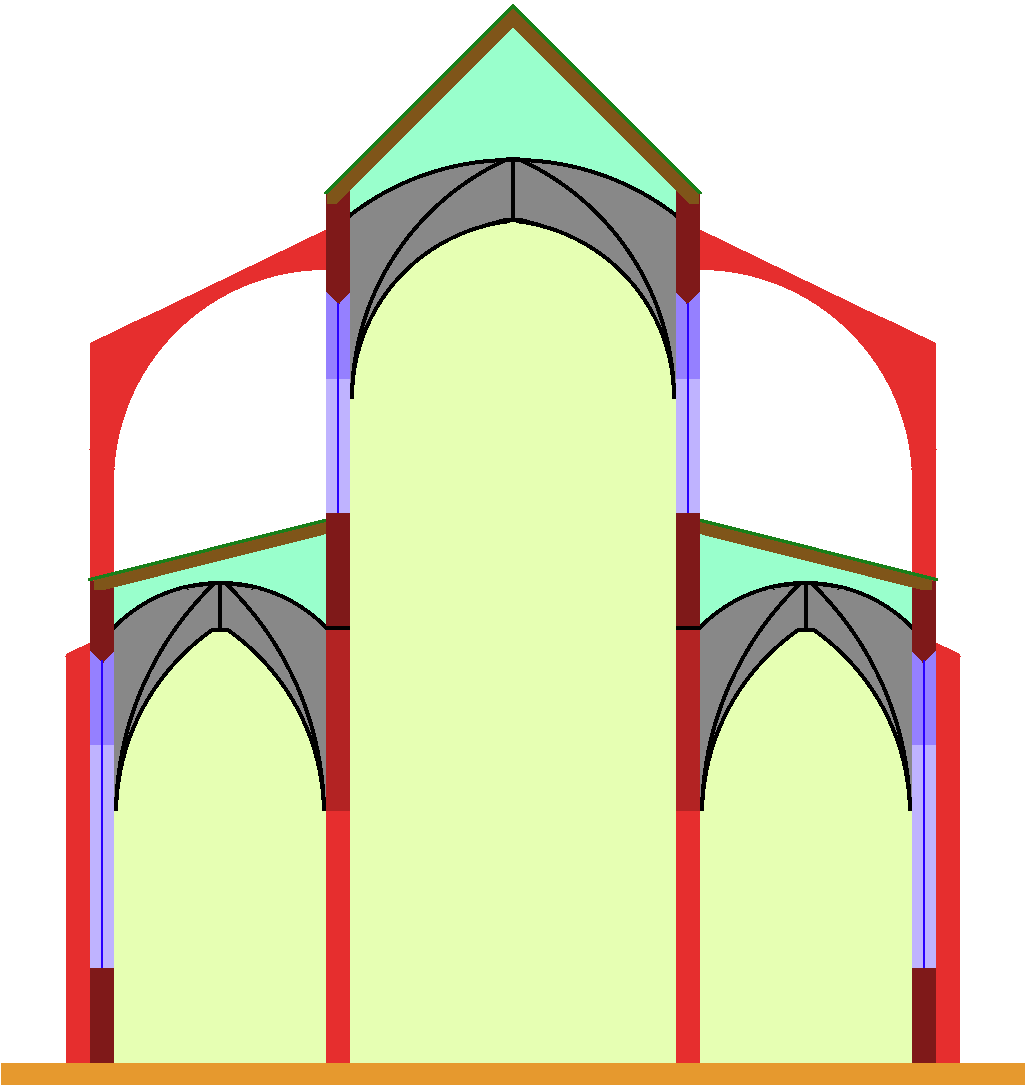
Basilica, the central nave extends to two storeys above the lateral aisles, called triforium and clerestory.

Various floorplans of hall churches:

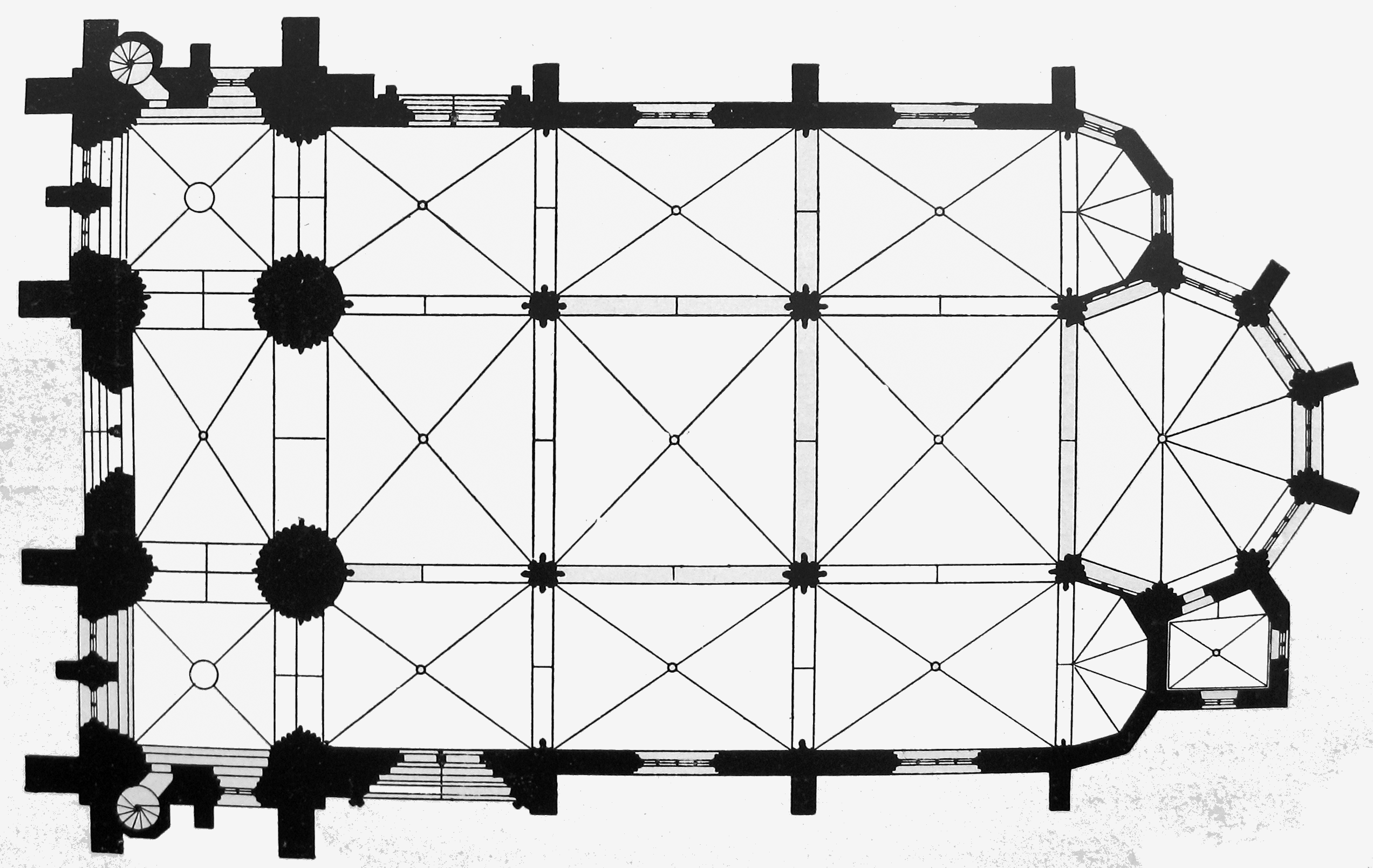
St.-Maria-zur Wiese, Soest, utilizing the Westphalian square

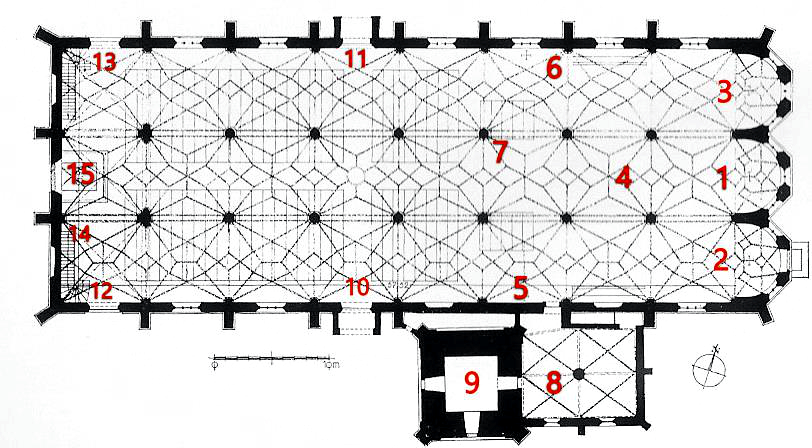
St. Martin's Church, Lauingen, with three equal naves

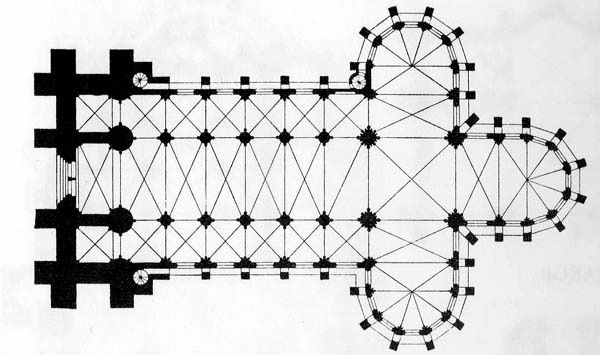
St. Elizabeth's Church, Marburg, cruciform

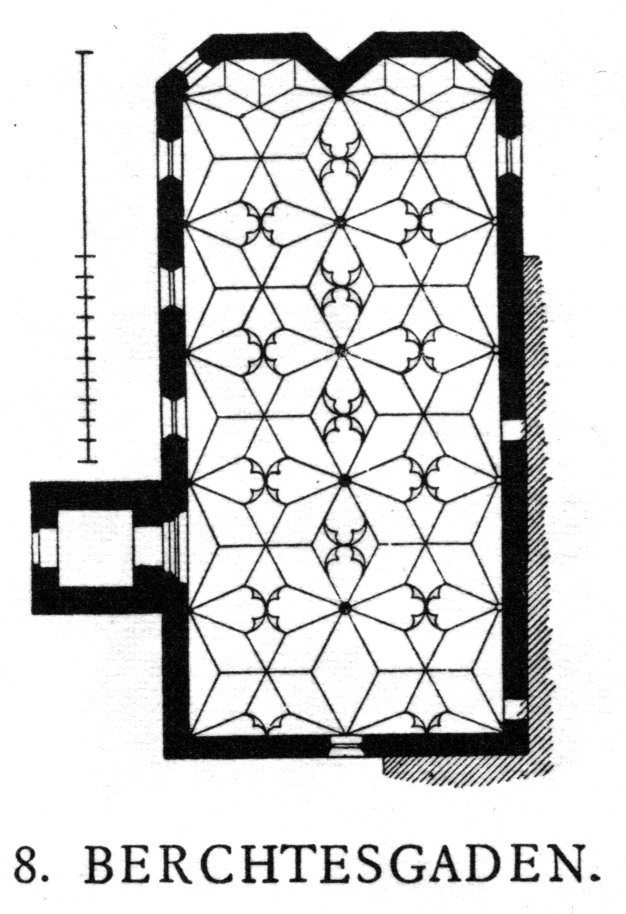
Franciscan Church, Berchtesgaden, with two equal naves

== See also ==
- Church hall
- List of hall churches
