= Le Sieci =

- Frazione
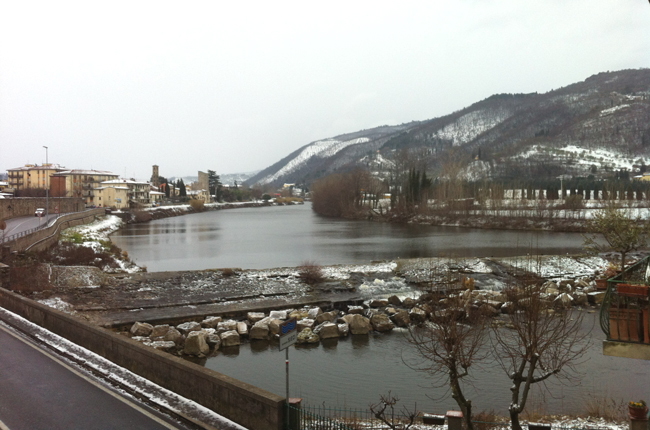

- Location within Italy Location within Tuscany
- Coordinates: 43.78929777624912°N 11.393506667785834°E
- Country: Italy
- Region: Tuscany
- Metropolitan city: Florence
- Commune: Pontassieve
- Confirmed: 1191

Le Sieci (or Sieci, formerly Remole) is a frazione of Pontassieve in Florence in the Italian region Tuscany.

== Physical geography ==
The town is located along the banks of the Arno river, at the point where the homonymous Sieci torrent flows (4 km), on the slopes of the Remole hillock (249 m). It borders to the north with Molino del Piano, to the east with the municipal capital, to the south with the hamlet of Villamagna in the municipality of Bagno a Ripoli, and to the west with the hamlet of Compiobbi in the municipality of Fiesole.

== History ==
The village of Sieci is mentioned in the thirteenth century for a place, called Lucente, located among the possessions of the archbishop's mess in Florence near San Martino a Sieci (today Molino del Piano). The toponym is however mentioned to indicate the homonymous torrent as early as the early 11th century.

In the early Middle Ages the castle of Remole acquired importance, which was confirmed in 1191 by the emperor Henry VI to the Benedictine nuns of Sant'Ellero, entrusting the patronage of the parish church of San Giovanni and its court to Guido Guerra, Count palatine of Tuscany. It was reconfirmed to his heirs by Frederick II in 1220 and 1247.

The village of Remole in 1833 had 766 inhabitants.

In the mid-nineteenth century, with the opening of the railway station, the hamlet began to expand along the railway track, near the Arno downstream of the castle of Remole, ending up taking on its current name Le Sieci. With its 3,500 inhabitants registered in the 2011 census, Le Sieci is the most populous village in the Municipality.

== Monuments and places of interest ==
Of particular interest are the parish church of San Giovanni, built in the Middle Ages in pure Romanesque style, and the now abandoned Brunelleschi pottery factory, the oldest in the area, dating back to 1774.

Not far away is the church of Saints Martino e Giusto in Quona, while in Gricigliano there is the Villa di Gricigliano, where the international seminary of the Institute of Christ the King High Priest is located.

== Anthropic geography ==
The town is divided into several districts: the center (Le Sieci), Le Sieci di Sotto, Giani and Remole, the historic core of the hamlet. The center of the village overlooks the main Piazza Albizzi.

== Economy ==
In Sieci there are the so-called "gualchiere di Remole", overlooking the Arno. Their foundation is believed to go back to the mid-14th century (after the 1333 flood ); the first documents on the site date back to 1425. They represent one of the rare examples of an Italian industrial factory belonging to the late Middle Ages. The ownership of the complex passed through the Albizzi, Rucellai and Valori, then it was owned by Arte della Lana (1541–1728) which, following the cessation of the activity, passed the property to Santa Maria del Fiore . During the Napoleonic era it was then the turn of the Chamber of Commerce of Florence and subsequently of the Municipality of Florence which has owned it since 2009.

== Infrastructure and transport ==
The hamlet is located along the Aretina road that connects Pontassieve to Florence and is served by its own railway station (Sieci station) on the Florence-Rome line.

== Note ==
1. ^ ^{a b c} Emanuele Repetti, « Sieci », in the Physical and Geographical Dictionary of Tuscany, vol. 5, Florence, p. 294.
2. ^ ^{a b c d e} Repetti, « Remole », in the Dictionary, cit., vol. 4, pp. 740–741.
3. ^
4. ^
5. ^ Museo Galileo website, Gualchiere di Remole
