= Gilles Wach =

French Roman Catholic Priest

Reverend Gilles Wach ICKSP
- Prior General of the Institute of Christ the King Sovereign Priest
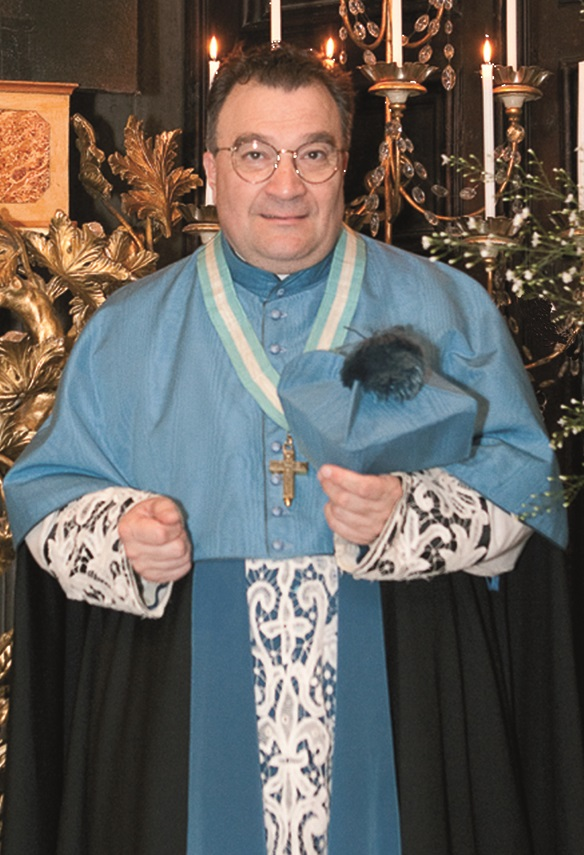

Orders
- Ordination: 24 June 1979 by Pope John Paul II

Personal details
- Born: 26 November 1956 (age 69) Troyes, Aube, France
- Education: Seminary of Genoa, Pontifical University of Saint Thomas Aquinas
- Coat of arms

Gilles Wach (born Troyes, 26 November 1956) is a French Roman Catholic priest, co-founder and Prior General of the Institute of Christ the King Sovereign Priest, a society of apostolic life of pontifical right.

== Biography ==
After finishing secondary school, he entered the seminary of Paray-le-Monial, where he did a year of formation. He moved to the seminary of the Diocese of Genoa, where he met Philippe Mora, who would be his friend and co-founder of the Institute of Christ the King Sovereign Priest. He was ordained a deacon by Giuseppe Cardinal Siri on 29 June 1978, and a priest by Pope John Paul II, on 24 June 1979, among other 24 deacons. He pursued his studies in Rome, residing at the Pontifical Irish College while studying for his doctorate in Theology at the Pontifical University of Saint Thomas Aquinas, with his thesis on St. Francis of Sales, Pédagogie de l'amour. L'éducation de la charité chez saint Francois.

Wach served as vicar general of the Diocese of Mouila, in Gabon, from 1989 until 1995.

He founded the Institute of Christ the King Sovereign Priest with Philippe Mora in 1990, a society of apostolic life, which was granted pontifical right in 2008. The ICKSP celebrates primarily the Extraordinary Form of the Roman Rite. He has been Prior General of the ICKSP since its inception until 2008, when he was elected for a six-year term. He was reelected for another six-year term in November 2014. He was elected for a third six-year term on 24 August 2020.

On 24 June 2024, Wach, accompanied by Rudolf Michael Schmitz, was received in a private audience with Pope Francis. According to the ICKSP, the Pope insisted that the institute "continue to serve the Church according to our own proper charism."

== Criticism ==
Wach has been accused of being "Machiavellian": enjoying expensive dinners, having seminarians act as servants, and wearing overly ornate and expensive ecclesiastical vesture. He was reprimanded in 2005 by Archbishop Piergiorgio Nesti of the Congregation for Institutes of Consecrated Life and Societies of Apostolic Life for inappropriately using the title "Monsignor", a papal honor which he had not earned. (Note: It has been reported that the ICKSP's constitutions approved in 2008 may have given him the right to use the title, but the constitutions are not available publicly.)
