= Frederick George Holweck =

German-American Roman Catholic parish priest and scholar (1856–1927)

The Right Reverend Monsignor Frederick George Holweck
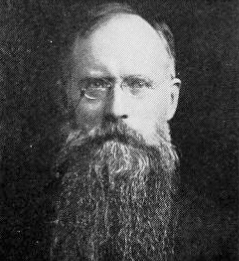
- Born: Friedrich Georg Holweck; December 29, 1856; Wiesloch, Baden
- Died: February 15, 1927 (aged 70); St. Louis, Missouri, U.S.
- Burial place: S. S. Peter & Paul Cemetery, St. Louis, Missouri, U.S.
- Religion: Catholic
- Church: Catholic Church
- Ordained: June 27, 1880

Frederick George Holweck (born Friedrich Georg Holweck; December 29, 1856 – February 15, 1927) was a German-American Catholic parish priest and scholar, hagiographer and church historian. Monsignor Holweck contributed some articles to the Catholic Encyclopedia.

As rector of St. Francis de Sales Church at St. Louis, Missouri, he was tasked with rebuilding the church after the original was destroyed by the Great St. Louis Tornado of 1896. The second edifice, incorporating many of the characteristics of German ecclesiastical architecture is familiarly known as "the Cathedral of South St. Louis". He also served as vicar-general of the Archdiocese of St. Louis.

== Life ==
Frederick George Holweck was born in Wiesloch, Baden, on December 29, 1856, the son of Sebastian and Mary E. Holweck. He was educated at the gymnasia in Freiburg and Karlsruhe. Because of the Kulturkampf in Germany, he emigrated with his parents to the St. Louis area. Holweck studied at the German Roman Catholic Seminary in Milwaukee, Wisconsin, and was ordained on June 27, 1880. Father Holweck served as an assistant in Jefferson City before returning to St. Louis, where he was assigned as assistant pastor at the Church of St. Francis de Sales in South St. Louis. The parish had been founded in the 1860s to serve the German immigrant community.

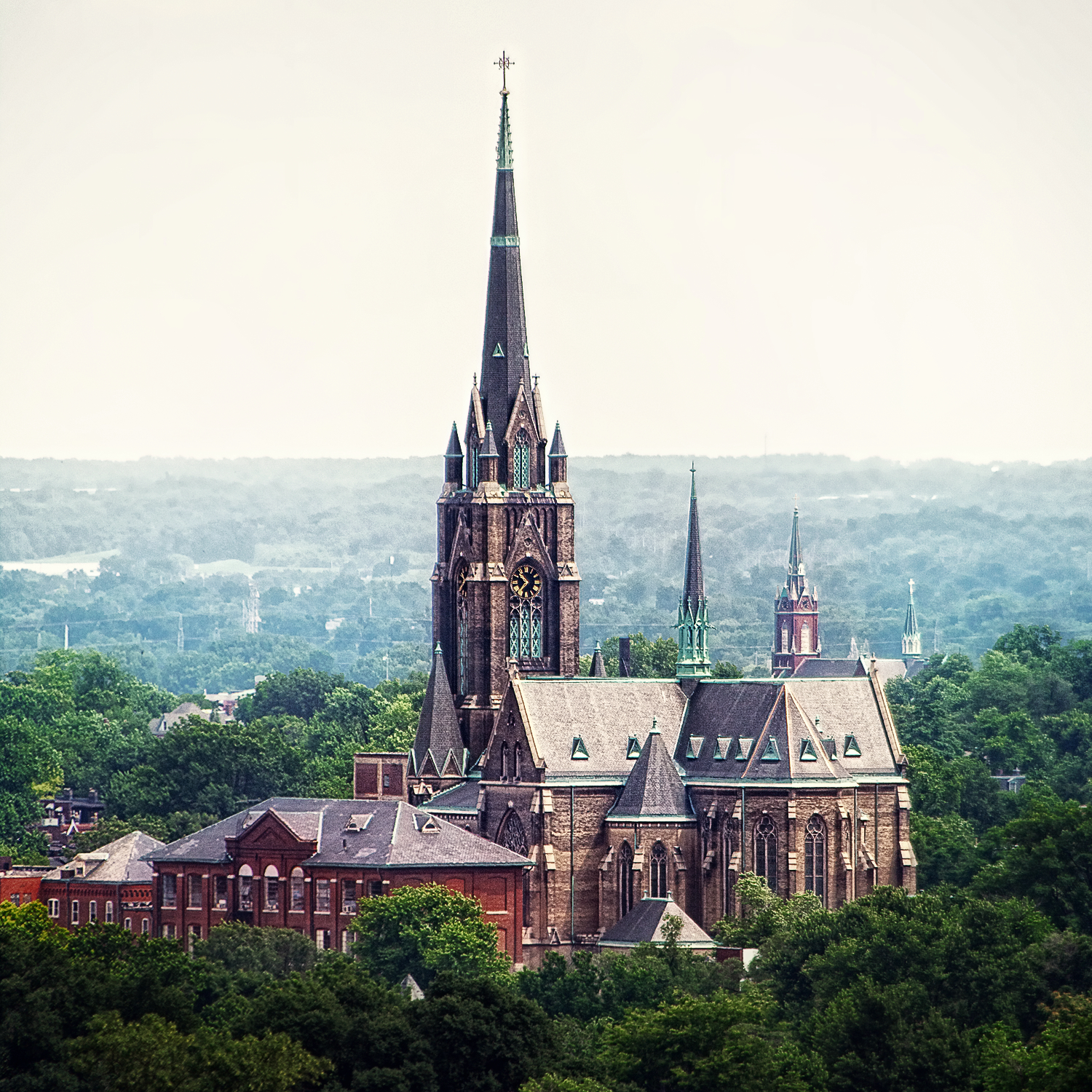
St. Francis de Sales Church at St. Louis, Missouri

Holweck could speak nearly 15 European languages fluently. From 1896 to 1892, he served as rector in Riviere aux Vases, Missouri. In May 1892, Holweck was appointed to the new St. Aloysius Gonzaga Parish in the city's famed "Hill" Neighborhood. A temporary frame church building, in honor of St. Aloysius, was dedicated on 16 October 1892 as well as a school building. Masses were largely in German. Around the turn of the century, numerous Italian immigrants arrived in the district. In 1903, Rev. Holweck invited Rev. Caesar Spigardi of St. Charles Borromeo Church in St. Charles, Missouri, to organize a mission for Italians in the St. Aloysius building. This mission raised funds to organize the St. Ambrose parish, which served primarily the recent Lombard immigrants, who were able to move into their own temporary building by year's end.

In 1903, Holweck returned to St. Francis De Sales Church as pastor. As the church had been destroyed by the tornado of 1896, he was charged with building a new one to meet the needs of the growing parish. The building was completed in 1908.

At the end of his life he was awarded the title Monsignor, an honorary appointment as domestic prelate to the Pope, and he served as Vicar-General for the Archdiocese of St. Louis. Monsignor Holweck served as pastor of St. Francis de Sales until his death in 1927. He was buried in the Priests Lot at S. S. Peter & Paul Cemetery.

== Works ==
Holweck had received an extensive advanced theological education. His 1892 Freiburg dissertation collected 940 Marian feasts and customs. He supported the St Louis Catholic Historical Society, as an original researcher into the local history of the diocese and in other fields. Holweck was a contributor to the Catholic Encyclopedia. His manuscripts are held by Saint Louis University.

- Fasti Mariani sive Calendarium Festorum Sancte.Mariae Virginis Deiparae Mcmoriis Historicis Illustratum. Auctore F. G. Holweck (Archdiocese of St. Louis) Freiburg im Breisgau: Herder, 1892. (Googlebook in Latin original) Reviewed critically in

- UK Jesuit periodical This Month Vol 76 October 1892 and another contemporary
- US periodical American Ecclesiastical Review, Volume

- Historical archives of the Archdiocese of St. Louis (1918)
- The American Martyrology, 1921.
- A Biographical Dictionary of the Saints, 1924.
- The seal of confession: A drama in five acts. Adapted from Father Spillman's story "A victim to the seal of confession." (1924)
- Calendarium liturgicum festorum dei et dei matris Mariae, edition of the Fasti Mariani, 1925.
