= Sisters Adorers of the Royal Heart of Jesus Christ Sovereign Priest =

Order of Catholic religious sisters

- Adoratrices Cordis Regalis Jesu Christi Summi Sacerdotis
- Coat of arms of the Sisters Adorers of the Royal Heart
- Formation: January 2001; 25 years ago
- Type: Catholic religious institute
- Headquarters: Gricigliano, Italy
- Members: 71 (2023)
- Website: https://adoratrices.icrss.org/en/

The Sisters Adorers of the Royal Heart of Jesus Christ Sovereign Priest (Latin: Adoratrices Cordis Regalis Jesu Christi Summi Sacerdotis) are a Catholic society of apostolic life of pontifical right. The sisters are associated with the Institute of Christ the King Sovereign Priest.

In 2026, The Pillar released a report announcing a Vatican investigation is underway after former novices alleged spiritually abusive behavior within the community.

== Foundation and growth ==
The society was founded in January 2001 (Note: The 2001 founding date is given by most sources, including, but not limited to:. Other sources (such as) give the date of the first profession as the founding date. One source gives both dates without further specification.) as the female branch of the Institute of Christ the King, a traditionalist Catholic priestly institute celebrating the Traditional Latin Mass. Cardinal Ennio Antonelli, at that time the Archbishop of Florence, bestowed the religious habit upon the first three sisters in June 2004. One sister and three postulants were received the following year. The community numbered nine sisters and four postulants in 2007 and 13 sisters and one postulant in 2009. In 2017 the sisters numbered 42. In 2008, on the feast day of Our Lady of the Rosary (7 October), the community received the status of pontifical right from Pope Benedict XVI. In 2023, there were 71 sisters distributed across 9 convents. They have three convents in Italy, one in Switzerland, one in Germany, one in England, one in Ireland, one in France, and one in the United States.

== Presence ==
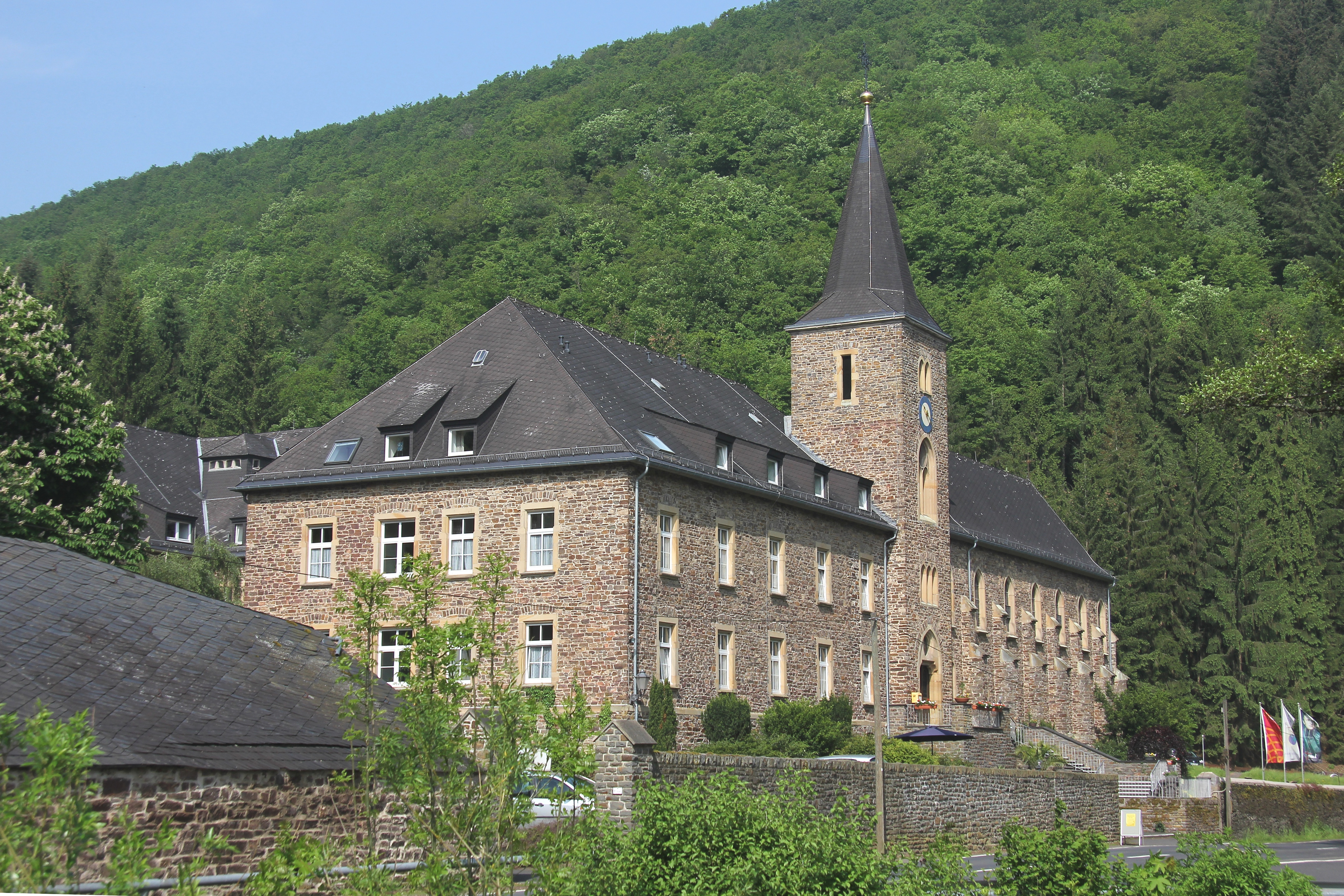
Maria Engelport Convent

The community's mother house is situated in Gricigliano, part of the Metropolitan City of Florence, Italy, which is also the location of the seminary of the Institute of Christ the King, who serve the community offering Mass and other sacraments. Since the Sisters first moved into the building they have undertaken extensive works of renovation.

Since 2010 the community is established in Le Noirmont, Switzerland, in a house formerly utilized by the Fathers of the Blessed Sacrament.

In December 2013 the Sisters bought the German monastery Maria Engelport, a Marian shrine and a local pilgrimage site in Rhineland-Palatinate, until then inhabited by the Missionary Oblates of Mary Immaculate. The community established itself on site on 1 January 2014. As of August 2014, 14 sisters lived in the monastery.

Since 2017 the Sisters are also present in Preston, England. In 2019 a novitiate was opened in Naples. On 19 May 2019 the Institute of Christ the King announced that the community will establish its first house in the United States, in Wausau, Wisconsin. Autumn was mentioned as the approximate time of the foundation. The purchase of a former bed and breakfast, which will serve as the convent, was finalized on 30 May. The property was blessed by Bishop William P. Callahan on 1 November of that year, and given the name 'The Nativity of Our Lady'.

== Spirituality ==
Religious habit of the Sisters Adorers

The way of life of the Sisters is that of a non-cloistered contemplative. They have as the community's three patron saints St. Francis de Sales, St. Benedict and St. Thomas Aquinas. The community participates in Mass and the Divine Office using the Traditional Latin Rite. Their daily schedule includes classes on Gregorian chant, Latin, philosophy and theology. They are also involved in manual labor such as sewing, lace-making or caring for liturgical vestments.
