= Pontassieve =

- Comune
- Comune di Pontassieve
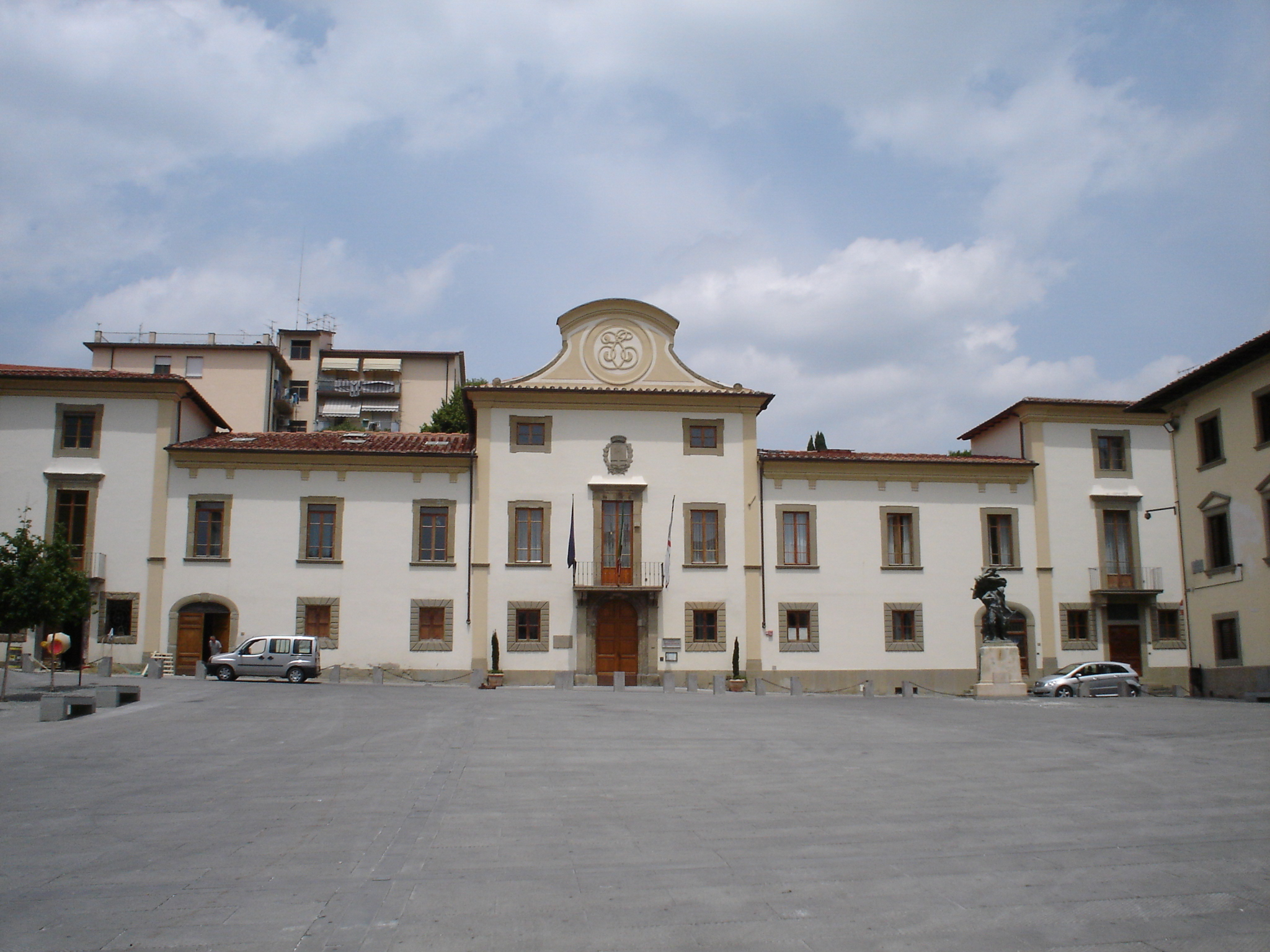

- Coat of arms

- Location within Italy Location within Tuscany
- Coordinates: 43°46′30″N 11°26′15″E
- Country: Italy
- Region: Tuscany
- Metropolitan city: Florence (FI)
- Frazioni: Acone, Colognole, Doccia, Le Falle, Le Sieci, Fornello, Lubaco, Madonna del Sasso, Molino del Piano, Montebonello, Monteloro, Monterifrassine, San Martino a Quona, Santa Brigida

Government
  - Mayor: Carlo Boni (since June 2024) (Partito Democratico, PD per Carlo Boni)

Area
  - Total: 114.4 km^{2} (44.2 sq mi)
- Elevation: 108 m (354 ft)

Population (1 January 2007)
  - Total: 20,622
  - Density: 180.3/km^{2} (466.9/sq mi)
- Demonym: Pontassievesi
- Time zone: UTC+1 (CET)
  - Summer (DST): UTC+2 (CEST)
- Postal code: 50065
- Dialing code: 055
- Website: Official website

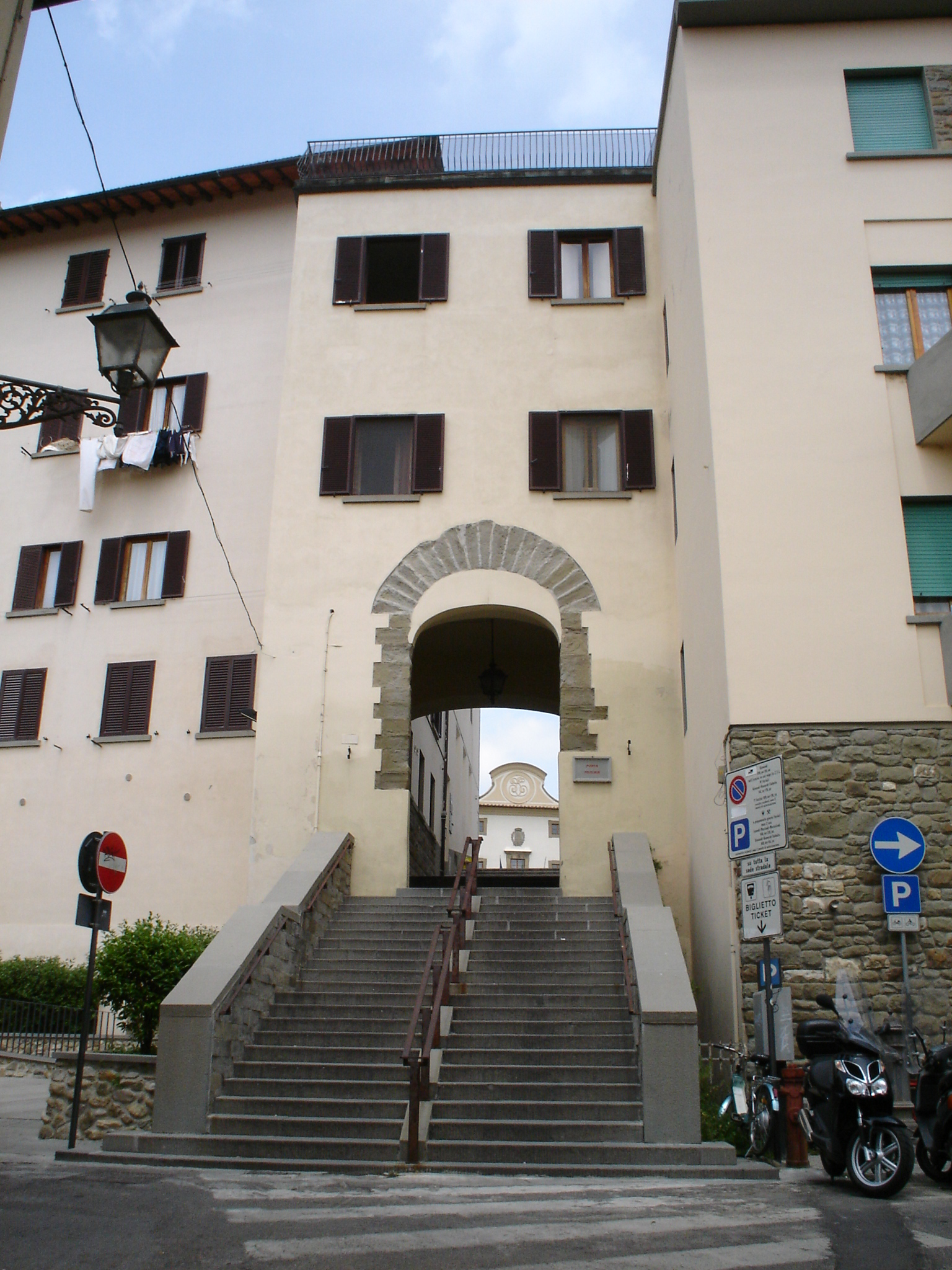
Porta Filicaia.

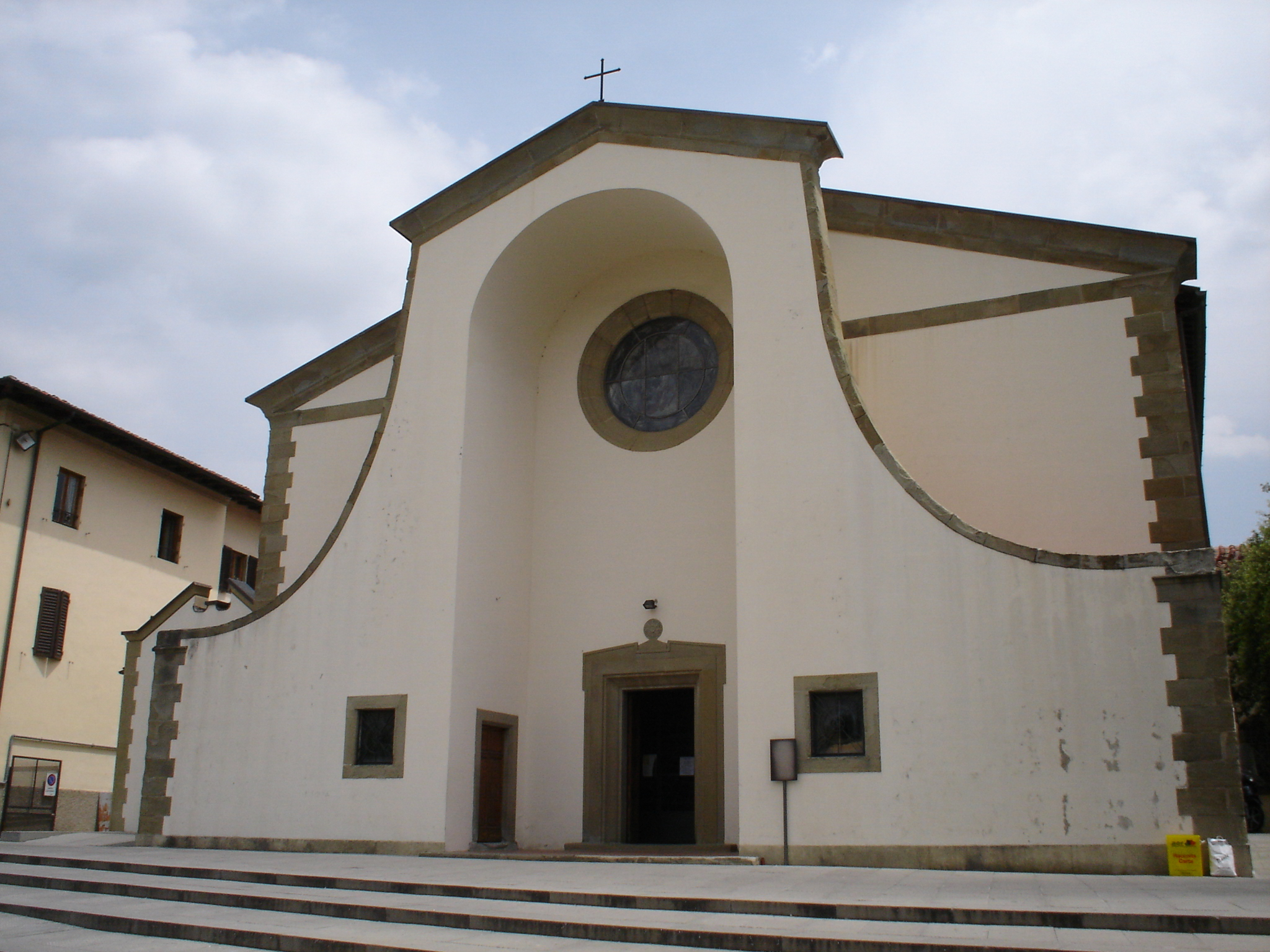
Church San Michele Arcangelo

Pontassieve is a comune (municipality) in the Metropolitan City of Florence in the Italian region Tuscany, located about 14 kilometres (9 mi) east of Florence, nearby Fiesole, at the confluence of the Arno and Sieve rivers.

== History ==
The first rulers of the area were the Quona nobles, whose Lordship is documented from the 11th century. These, a branch of whom at a later date also appeared under the name of Filicaia, settled in Florence at the end of the 12th century and in 1207 sold a large part of its territory of jurisdiction to the Bishopric of Florence.

In 1375 Florence had a castle erected here for an essentially strategic use on the land of Pontassieve. First the town took the name of "Castel Sant’Angelo" (Saint Angel Castle), later obtaining the current referring to the importance of the bridge on the river, that was the main way joining the Republic of Florence to the territories of the Mugello, Casentino and the city of Arezzo.

At the end of the 18th century, the new House of Lorraine’s Dukes gave a great impulse to the town economy. Thanks to the Ducal works for the reclamation of the territory and the opening of two new roads, that joined Pontassieve to the Casentino and Emilia, Pontassieve lived a remarkable economic growth. Under the Lorenese domination Pontassieve was elevated to the rank of Vicarship’s Town Hall comprising part of the territories belonging to the Arno and Sieve valleys.

In 1859 the construction of a Florence-Rome railway (later followed by the Florence-Borgo San Lorenzo line) gave an additional impulse to the town's economy, turning it into an industrial hub. In 1861 Pontassieve was annexed to the newly formed Kingdom of Italy.

During World War II Pontassieve, for its importance as a rail junction, suffered substantial damage: the railways and the town itself were repeatedly bombed by Allied planes, which destroyed it almost entirely. The town's present day aspect is due, for the most part, to the post war reconstruction. Even though, the town has kept its original medieval look in the city center.

== Economy ==
The economy of the town is primarily based on the industrial activities, including the food, mechanical and electronic sectors, as well as on the manufacture of glass and pottery. Traditional leather craftsmanship also continues to flourish, while the area is also renowned for the production of the Vino Chianti Putto oil.

Among the events held in Pontassieve is the Toscanello d'oro, a festival held each May featuring a market of local food and wines.

== Main sights ==
- Church of Sant'Eustachio, at Acone, also referred to as Sant'Eustachio in Jerusalem, used to be the mother church of the vast Acone parish.
- Church of Santa Maria, also at Acone. Its foundation dates to 925. Protectors of the church were, among many, the Donati family and the San Matteo Hospital in Florence.
- Church of Sant'Andrea, at Doccia. Mentioned for the first time in 1024 in official Vatican papers by bishop Ildebrand, as a property of San Miniato al Monte monastery.
- Pieve of San Giovanni a Remole in Le Sieci, dating to 955. It was head of a parish extending on both sides of the Arno river.
- Pieve of Santi Gervasio e Martino, at Lobaco. The old church, dedicated to San Gervasio is located in Alpiniano, and dates back to the 11th century.
- Sanctuary of Madonna delle Grazie. This sanctuary is also known as "Madonna del Sasso" because of a series of apparitions of the Virgin Mary in 1484. The building was erected in 1490, taking the place of a medieval oratory.
- Church of San Martino at Molino del Piano, first documented in the 13th century. It was owned by the bishop of Fiesole and the Saltarelli family.
- Pieve of San Lorenzo, at Montefiesole. Existing since 1190 but transformed into a parish in 1461, it lies next to the ruins of the castle belonging to the bishop of Florence, who ruled these lands.
- Prepository of San Michele Arcangelo, documented since the beginning of the 13th century. Completely rebuilt in the 18th century, it was consecrated in 1788.
- Church of Santi Martino e Giusto, at Quona. Originally dedicated to San Martino, later called San Giusto after the first church was demolished.
- Church of Santa Brigida, in Pontassieve town. Built, according to tradition, on the cave chosen by the saint for meditation in the 10th century, it has been enlarged throughout the 16th-17th centuries and largely restored and modified in 1938 and 1954.
- Church of San Giovanni Battista at Monteloro. Documented since 1102, the small building lies next to the ruins of the eponymous castle, which was, since the 9th century, a fief of the Fiesole bishop.
- Villa Martelli, at Gricigliano in the località of Sieci. It has been converted into a seminary of The Institute of Christ the King Sovereign Priest (Institutum Christi Regis Summi Sacerdotis) and of Sisters Adorers of the Royal Heart of Jesus Christ Sovereign Priest.
- Castello Del Trebbio constructed in 1184 by the noble Florentine banking family called Pazzi. Across the street is the wine country restaurant La Sosta del Gusto the building in which is house pre-dates the Castello

== Twin towns ==
- Griesheim, Germany
- Saint-Genis-Laval, France
- (Western Sahara) Tifariti, Sahrawi Arab Democratic Republic
- Znojmo, Czech Republic
