= St. Francis de Sales Oratory =

Historic church in St. Louis, Missouri, United States

Saint Francis de Sales Oratory
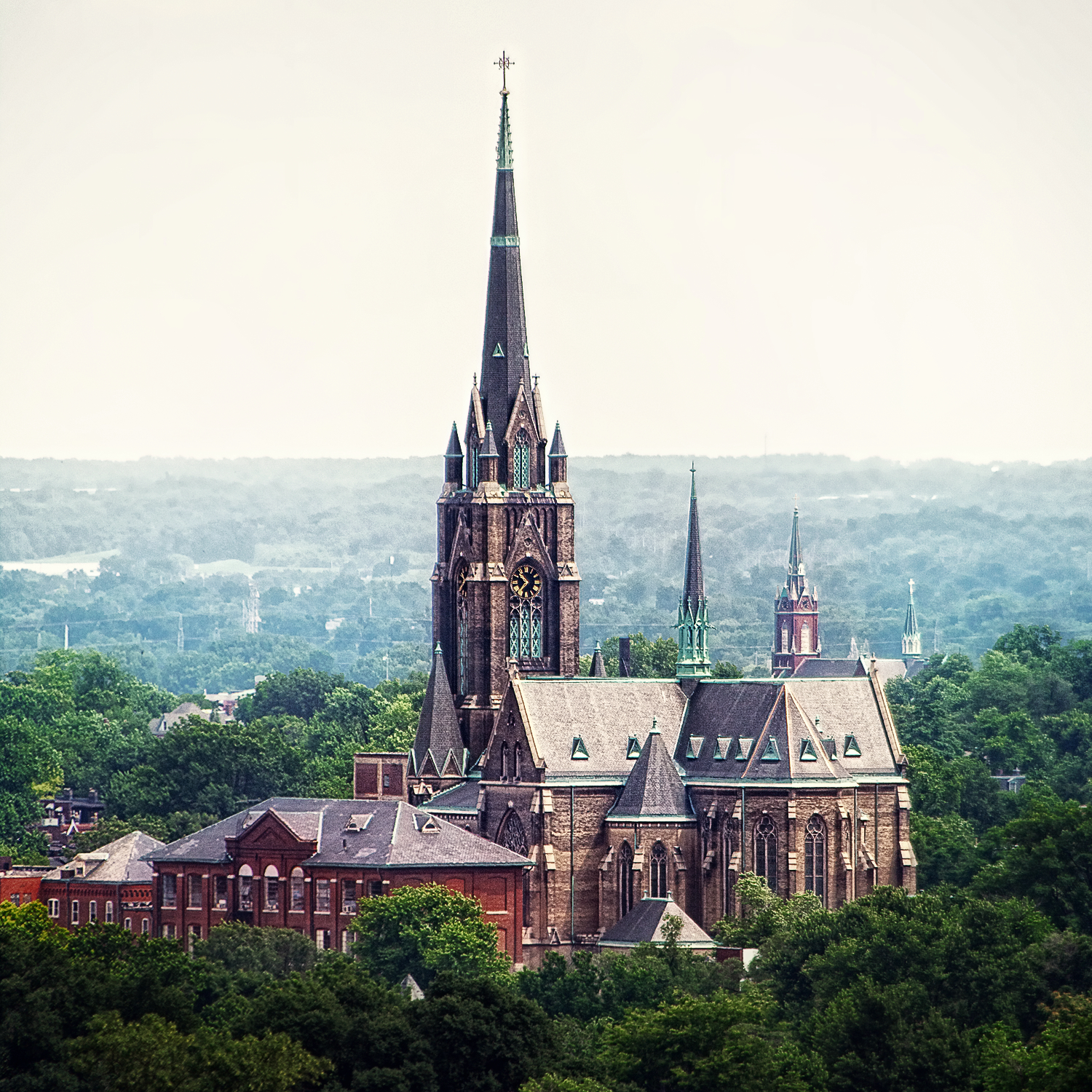
- Saint Francis de Sales Oratory
- Saint Francis de Sales Oratory
- Location: St. Louis, Missouri
- Country: United States
- Denomination: Roman Catholic
- Website: https://www.institute-christ-king.org/stlouis-home

History
- Status: Oratory
- Founded: 1867
- Dedicated: May 24, 1868 (first church); November 26, 1908 (current church)

Architecture
- Functional status: Active
- Heritage designation: National Register of Historic Places
- Designated: November 2, 1978
- Style: Gothic Revival
- Years built: 1907-1908
- Demolished: 1896 (first church, by tornado)

Administration
- Division: Institute of Christ the King Sovereign Priest
- Diocese: Archdiocese of St. Louis

Clergy
- Rector: Rev. Canon Benjamin Coggeshall
- Vicar(s): Rev. Canon Paul McKown, Rev. Canon Gerald F. Bell
- St. Francis de Sales Church
- U.S. National Register of Historic Places
- St. Louis Landmark
- Location within St. Louis Location within Missouri Location within the United States
- Location: 2653 Ohio St., St. Louis, Missouri
- Coordinates: 38°36′15″N 90°13′33″W
- Area: less than one acre
- Built: 1907
- Architect: Klutho & Ranft
- Architectural style: Late Gothic Revival, Other, German-American Gothic Revl.
- NRHP reference No.: 78003393
- Added to NRHP: November 2, 1978

St. Francis de Sales Church, also known as the Oratory of Saint Francis de Sales, is a Catholic oratory in south St. Louis, Missouri. It is the second largest church in the Archdiocese of St. Louis after the Cathedral Basilica of Saint Louis. The church is popularly known as the "Cathedral of South St. Louis".

The historic main church was designed in the neo-Gothic style. Its stained glass windows were crafted by the St. Louis glazier Emil Frei Sr. It was listed on the National Register of Historic Places in 1978. Since 2005, the church has been operated by the Institute of Christ the King Sovereign Priest, which offers the Latin Mass and emphasizes the liturgical arts with a strong music program.

== Beginnings ==
St. Francis de Sales parish was formed in 1867 to serve a growing German Catholic community, whose members, at that time, were attending the church of Saints Peter and Paul in Soulard. The cornerstone was laid on September 15, 1867. During the ceremony a stand collapsed due to vandals having sawed some of the supporting timbers the previous night. No one was seriously injured. Although the church was still under construction, the first Mass was celebrated that Christmas. The building was dedicated the following May, by which time the church had 800 members. It is dedicated in honor of Saint Francis de Sales (d. 1622), bishop and doctor of the Church. The parish developed schools on its campus for Catholic children of elementary and high school levels. Given the majority ethnic German parish, for many years the sermon at Holy Mass was given in German. Classes at the school were also conducted in German.

In 1903, Frederick George Holweck, German-American scholar and church historian, returned as pastor to St. Francis De Sales, where he had earlier served as curate. The original church and a new church building by Engelbert Seibertz, still under construction, were both destroyed by the great St. Louis Tornado of 1896. Holweck was charged with building a new church to meet the needs of the growing parish. The building was completed in 1908.

== Architecture ==
=== Exterior ===
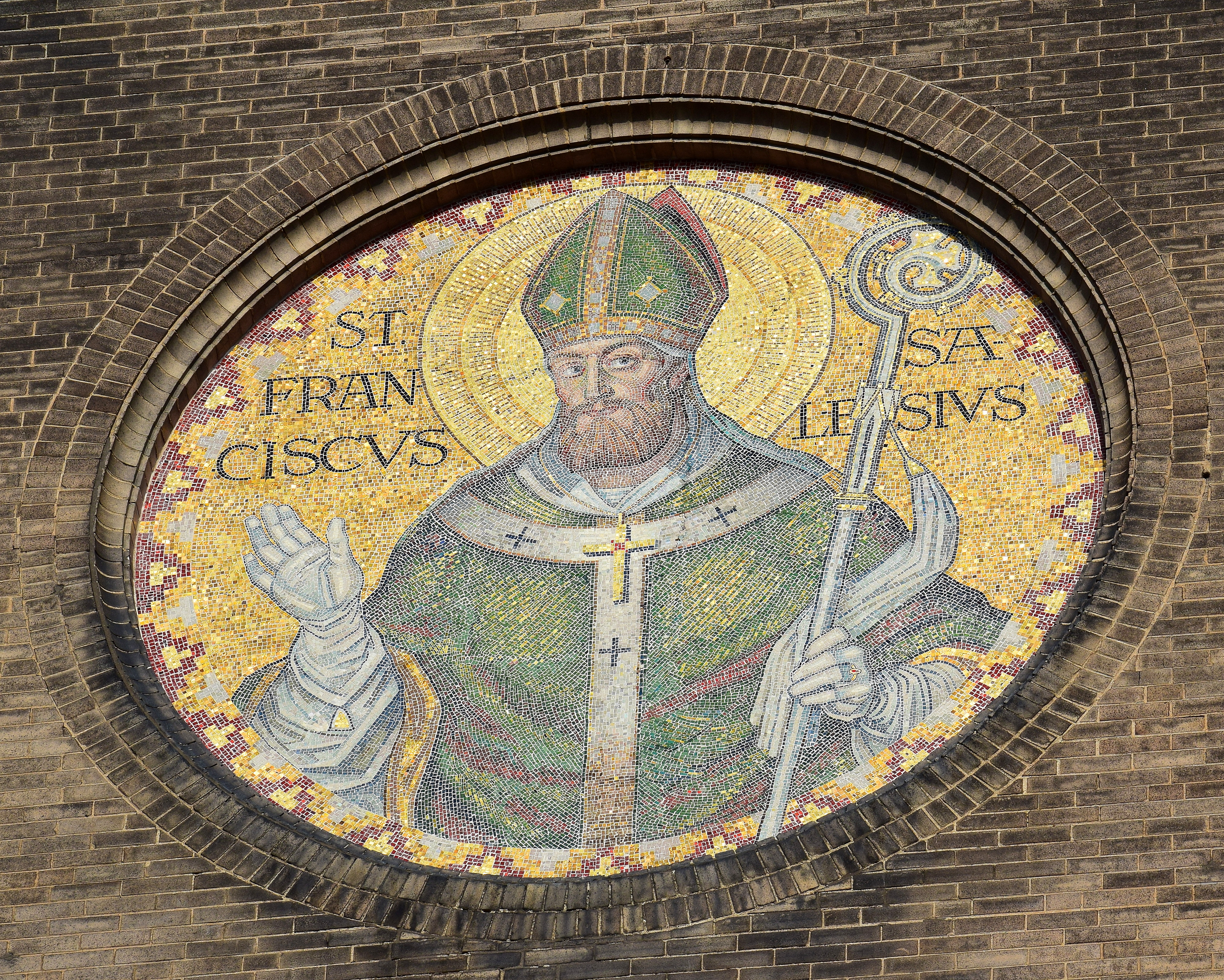
Exterior mosaic of St. Francis de Sales

Saint Francis de Sales Church was rebuilt in a neo-Gothic style according to the design of Berlin architect Viktor Klutho. While the front portal mirrors the Gothic portal of the Cathedral of Munich, the tower shows the influence of the Cathedral at Ulm. At 300 feet tall, the church, with its main spire, is tied in rank as the sixth-tallest church in the United States.

In 1968, St. Francis de Sales was named a significant historic building by the local chapter of the American Institute of Architects. In 1978 it was added to the National Register of Historic Places.

=== Interior ===
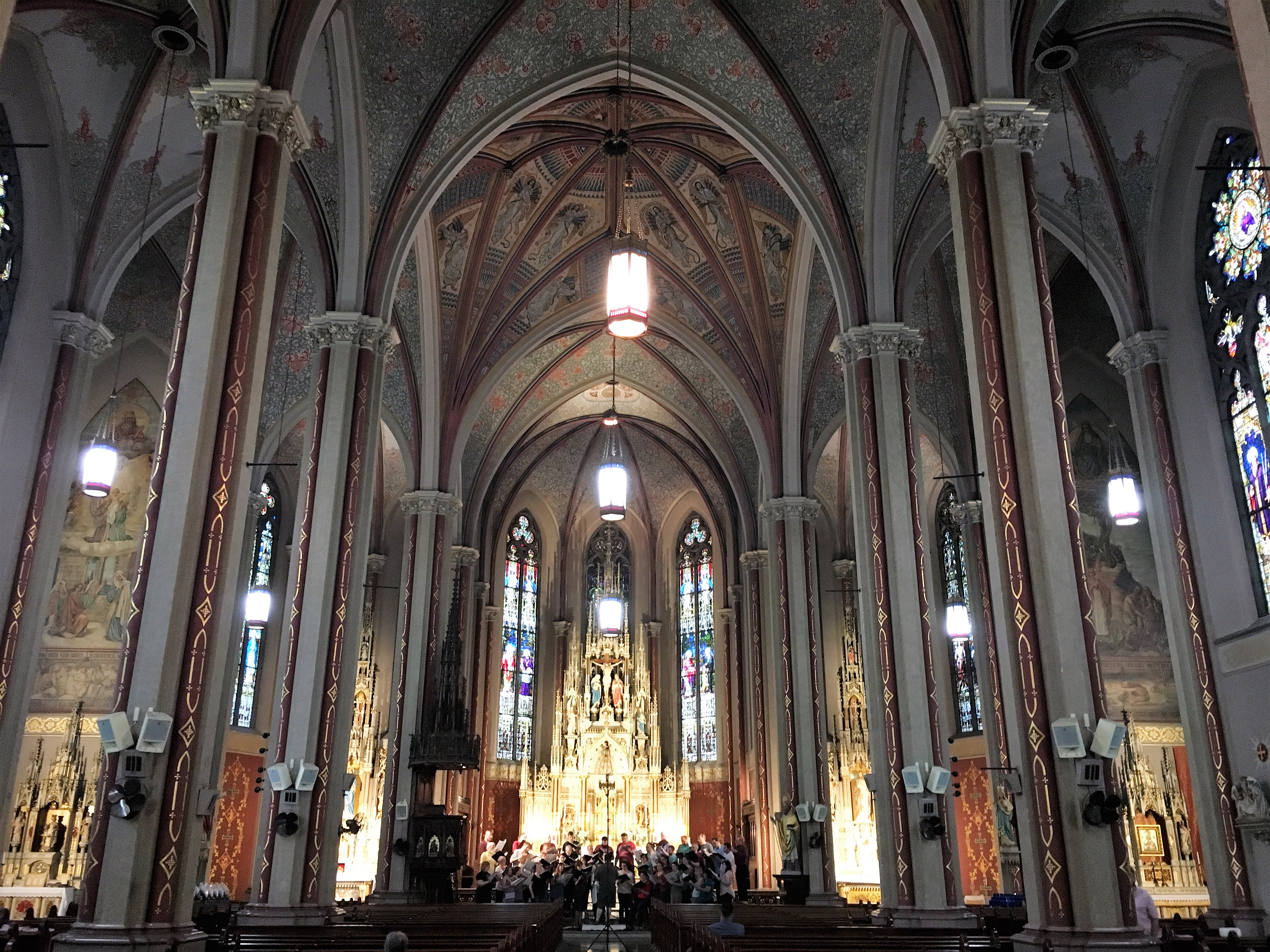
Interior

The sanctuary contains a 52-foot-tall (16 m) altarpiece featuring a polychrome sculpture of the Crucifixion in its upper register. Side altars are located in two subsidiary apses and dedicated to the Blessed Virgin Mary and Saint Joseph. There are altars as well in honor of Our Mother of Perpetual Help and the Infant of Prague. It is a German "hall church", with side aisles almost as tall as the 70-foot-high nave. The hall church plan permits exceptionally tall windows; the stained glass is the work of the eminent St. Louis glazier Emil Frei, Sr., at that time recently arrived from Munich. German saints include St. Henry, St. Boniface, St. Elizabeth, and the Blessed Herman Joseph Steinfeld. The Winkle Terra Cotta Company of St. Louis produced much of the window tracery. The interior frescoes were painted by German immigrant Fridolin Fuchs in 1916; the rose shade of the ceiling decorations are particularly characteristic of German churches.

== Today ==
Founded in the 1860s to serve the German immigrant community, today Saint Francis de Sales is home to a growing congregation from several backgrounds. The adjacent high school building is leased by a KIPP charter school; the original grade school building provides facilities for the Oratory's community of approximately 100 home-schooled children. The home-school cooperative meets every Wednesday and provides instruction in literature, catechism, the natural sciences, etc.

In 2005, the parish was closed and the church was designated as an oratory. At the invitation of Archbishop Raymond Burke, then archbishop of St. Louis, the Oratory has been entrusted to the care of the Institute of Christ the King Sovereign Priest, a Roman Catholic priestly community of Pontifical right dedicated to the traditional Latin liturgy. The Institute's first rector at Saint Francis de Sales was the Rev. Canon Karl W. Lenhardt. The present rector of the Oratory is the Rev. Canon Benjamin Coggeshall.

Unlike a parish, which has geographically determined boundaries, the Oratory does not cover a specified territory; the Oratory has permission to conduct baptisms, weddings and funerals, in addition to Holy Mass and confessions. In accord with the Institute of Christ the King's emphasis on the solemnity of the sacred liturgy and the beauty of liturgical arts, the Oratory has a highly developed music program, with several choirs specializing in Gregorian chant and polyphony. In the summer of 2009, the Oratory music program organized a course of Gregorian chant for beginners. The Oratory has played host to the St. Louis Chamber Chorus.

In November 2008, the church celebrated the 100th anniversary of the dedication of the new building with a solemn pontifical Mass celebrated by Bishop Robert J. Hermann, followed by a festive reception featuring traditional German cuisine. The Oratory also announced the beginning of a capital campaign to raise funds for important restoration work.

In a 2010 interview with the St. Louis Post-Dispatch, former Rector Canon Michael Wiener said, "St. Francis de Sales is the anchor of this neighborhood, and when we revitalize, the whole neighborhood revitalizes." According to Chris Naffziger of St. Louis Magazine, "...the sense of place and history that St. Francis de Sales gives to the South Side of St. Louis is immeasurable."

=== Sacred music and organ installation ===
In September 2015, the Choir of Saint Francis de Sales Oratory, under the direction of Mr. Nicholas Botkins released a recording of polyphonic music entitled O Lux Beatissima. The album includes the first commercial recordings of Max Filke's Missa in honorem beatae Mariae Virginis for choir and orchestra, as well as the premier recording of John Osterhagen's Tantum Ergo, written for and dedicated to the Oratory's Ladies' Schola.

A 2019 press release announced the purchase of Karl Wilhelm Opus 123, a three-manual and pedal, 58-rank freestanding mechanical-action organ. Originally built for a church in Syracuse, New York, the organ contains 2,670 pipes in five white oak freestanding cases. The instrument is more than double the size of the Oratory's existing three-manual and pedal, 22-rank gallery organ from 1924 by the Wicks Organ Company of Highland, Illinois. The Wicks instrument replaced an even smaller two-manual and pedal, 15-rank instrument by J.G. Pfeffer & Sons of St. Louis from 1897. It was rebuilt and enlarged by Gustav Treu in 1909 upon relocation and installation into the current church. This earlier instrument survives today and continues to serve St. Mary's Roman Catholic Church of Altus, Arkansas, where it was installed in 1925. Like the original instrument by Pfeffer & Sons, the new Wilhelm organ contains entirely mechanical key and stop action and is hand built using the most traditional construction techniques so that it can withstand centuries of use.

Although the existing Wicks organ is an historic instrument and an important example of the American Romantic movement of organ building from the first quarter of the 20th century, it lacks substantial historical integrity. Several original components, including the console and some important ranks of original pipework, are missing. Even when new, the Wicks organ was inadequate to fill the soaring Gothic Revival church.

== Recognition ==
St. Francis de Sales Oratory won the 'Church Madness 2017' vote for the most beautiful Roman Catholic Church in the United States. It was the first time the building had been entered into the March Madness format internet contest, sponsored by Granda Liturgical Arts.

It is listed in the National Register of Historic Places.
