= Church of the Holy Cross (Cádiz) =

- Iglesia de la Santa Cruz (Spanish)
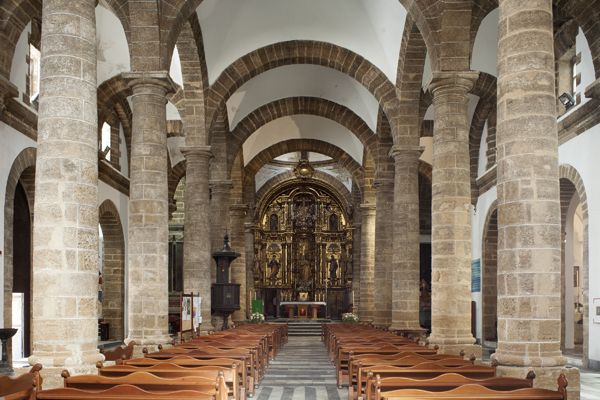

- Location within Spain
- 36.529135°N 6.295254°W
- Location: Cádiz, Spain

Spanish Cultural Heritage
- Official name: Catedral de Santa Cruz
- Type: Non-movable
- Criteria: Monument
- Designated: 1987

The Church of the Holy Cross (Spanish: Iglesia de la Santa Cruz) is a Roman Catholic church in the Spanish city of Cádiz. It was the cathedral of the Diocese of Cádiz y Ceuta between 1602 and 1838, when the new Cádiz Cathedral was completed.

Originally built in 1262 after the conquest of the city by Alfonso X, it was completely rebuilt by 1602 after the first building was burned down by a combined Anglo-Dutch fleet commanded by Admiral Charles Howard, 1st Earl of Nottingham, who sacked Cádiz in 1596.
