= Institute of Christ the King Sovereign Priest =

Traditionalist Roman Catholic society of apostolic life

- Institutum Christi Regis Summi Sacerdotis
- Coat of arms of the institute
- Abbreviation: ICKSP
- Formation: 1 September 1990
- Founders: Philippe Mora; Gilles Wach
- Type: Society of apostolic life of pontifical right
- Headquarters: Gricigliano, Italy
- Prior general: Gilles Wach
- Vicar general: Rudolf Michael Schmitz
- Website: institute-christ-king.org

The Institute of Christ the King Sovereign Priest, Latin: Institutum Christi Regis Summi Sacerdotis, abbreviated as ICKSP and ICRSS, is a traditionalist Catholic society of apostolic life of pontifical right in communion with the Holy See of the Catholic Church. The institute has the stated goal of honouring God and the sanctification of priests in the service of the Catholic Church and souls. An integral part of the institute's charism is the use of the traditional liturgy, namely the 1962 Missale Romanum for Mass, the Breviary of John XXIII for the Divine Office, and the Rituale Romanum and Pontificale Romanum for other sacraments. The society has undertaken the restoration of a number of historic church buildings.

The institute's rule of life is based generally on that of the secular canons. Its stated mission is the defence and propagation of the reign of Christ the King in all areas of human life, both private and social.

== Early years ==
The institute was canonically erected on 1 September 1990 by Gilles Wach and Philippe Mora in Gabon, Africa, where the Institute still has missions, notably in the capital Libreville. Its canonical status was of diocesan right until 7 October 2008. On that date, it was granted the status of pontifical right by decree, titled Saeculorum Rex, of the Pontifical Commission Ecclesia Dei, on the occasion of the visit of Camille Perl, the vice-president of the commission. Deacons and priests are incardinated into the institute, whose prior general has the right to call to orders.

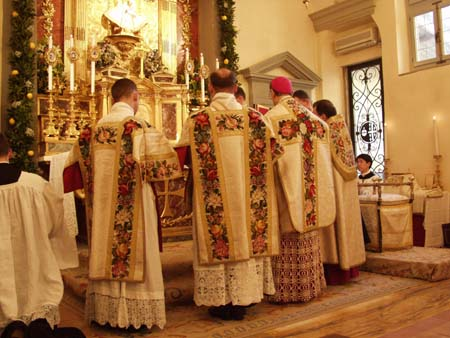
Solemn Pontifical Mass being celebrated in the Institute's seminary chapel in Griciliano, Italy

The institute is based in Gricigliano, Italy, in the Archdiocese of Florence. Its international seminary of Saint Philip Neri is also located there, and the institute's ordinations and other major masses are held at the church of San Gaetano in Florence.

Wach serves as prior general and Mora as rector of the seminary. Both received their priestly formation under Cardinal Giuseppe Siri of Genoa.

As of 2023, the institute has 147 priests, as well as clerical oblates who go through formation but may only be ordained up to the permanent diaconate, working instead for the several apostolates of the institute.

The charism of the institute is based on the example of its three patron saints:

- Francis de Sales, who emphasized teaching the Catholic faith with patience and charity, encouraging all Catholics to a life of holiness through the ordinary means of the Church, such as devout attendance at Mass and frequent confession.
- Benedict of Nursia, with his love for the solemn celebration of the liturgy, his emphasis on work and prayer, "Benedictine hospitality", and role in laying the groundwork for an integral Christian civilization in medieval Europe.
- Thomas Aquinas, with his emphasis on the harmony between faith and reason.

The institute also honors as its primary patroness the Virgin Mary under the title "of the Immaculate Conception, to Whom it is consecrated." Saint Thérèse of the Child Jesus is the patroness of its African missions.

== Apostolates ==
In the United States, the institute is headquartered in Chicago, with presences in Illinois, Wisconsin, Missouri, New Jersey, Connecticut, California, Arizona, Michigan, Pennsylvania, Louisiana, Ohio, New York and Massachusetts. By 2025, apostolates had been added in Nevada and Florida. There are now (2026) a total of 27 apostolates in the USA. In Chicago, the institute is restoring the historic Saint Clara/Saint Gelasius Church on Carmelite Way, which is also the site of the headquarters for the American Province of the institute. Upon completion, it will become the Shrine of Christ the King.

Its oldest United States apostolate is the Saint Mary Oratory in Rockford, Illinois, and its newest is St. Josaphat Oratory in Queens, New York. In Kansas City, Missouri, Bishop Robert Finn established an oratory (a public church where Mass and other rites may be celebrated) in 2005 for the institute at a historic church otherwise in danger of being closed. Also in 2005 St. Francis de Sales Church in Saint Louis, Missouri was established as an oratory under care of the institute, to serve the city and region. It is leading efforts to restore the church and has installed a new organ. The superior for the United States is Matthew Talarico.

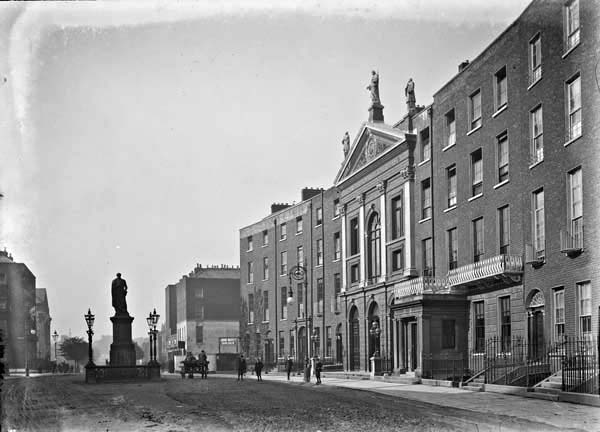
The Crescent showing Jesuits Church, Limerick

In England, the Institute is active in the Diocese of Shrewsbury, where they have apostolates in New Brighton and Shrewsbury, in the Diocese of Lancaster, where they have a church in Preston and the Diocese of Plymouth, where they have a church in Torquay. In 2011 the Bishop of Shrewsbury invited the institute to re-open the Church of Saints Peter, Paul, and Philomena in New Brighton.

Since Saint Patrick's Day, 17 March 2006, the institute has had a presence in the Diocese of Limerick in the Republic of Ireland. In Limerick City, they purchased Sacred Heart Church, Since May 2010, the institute has expanded into the Irish diocese of Galway, where weekly Mass is offered at Saint Mary's College school; monthly Masses are offered by priests of the institute in Ennis. The institute is also closely involved in the annual Catholic Voice conference held in Limerick, which features amongst its regular speakers Cardinal Raymond Leo Burke and John Hunwicke. Since December 2019 the institute has had an established apostolate in Belfast (Diocese of Down and Connor) following the purchase of the former Fortwilliam & Macrory Presbyterian Church. In April 2021, the Institute purchased a convent in Ardee, County Louth for use by a community of its female religious, the Sisters Adorers.

In addition to its oratories in the United States and missions in Africa, the institute also has apostolates in France, Spain, Belgium, Italy, Germany, Austria, and Switzerland. It also has care of Santi Celso e Giuliano, a papal chapel and minor basilica in Rome, as of 2019. The institute is especially active in the domain of education, running schools in France (Montpellier, Lille and Versailles), Belgium (Brussels International Catholic School), and Africa.

During its yearly ordinations week in Italy, the institute has had visits by Cardinals Raymond Leo Burke, Antonio Cañizares Llovera, Darío Castrillón Hoyos, as well as Archbishop Camille Perl.

== Sisters Adorers of the Royal Heart of Jesus ==
The Adorers of the Royal Heart of Jesus Christ Sovereign Priest are a women's community founded in 2001 that is associated with the institute. They are also based in Gricigliano. The sisters are non-cloistered contemplatives, and their way of life is based on the Benedictine tradition.

The community celebrates Mass and the Divine Office using the traditional form of the Roman Rite, celebrated according to the pre–Vatican II rubrics. Needlework and embroidery projects form an important part of their daily Ora et Labora ("Pray and Work").

When the number of sisters has increased sufficiently, the community plans to plant convents near the institute's churches, where the sisters will perform apostolic work such as teaching. As of 2017, the sisters numbered 42, increasing to 60 by 2022. The sisters now have nine convents in seven countries. They are at Gricigliano, Livorno and Naples in Italy, Engelport in Germany, Les Cotes in Switzerland, Preston in England, Ardee in Ireland, Wausau in the USA, and Loisy in France. Gricigliano is their Mother House and Naples their Noviciate.

== Society of the Sacred Heart ==
The Society of the Sacred Heart is a lay society associated with the institute. The lay members of the society pledge to live according to a modified Benedictine rule, within their vocation. Through membership in the society, lay faithful can participate in the spiritual and social missions of the institute through prayer, devotions, spiritual direction, and study of the spiritual writings of Saint Francis de Sales.

== Superiors ==
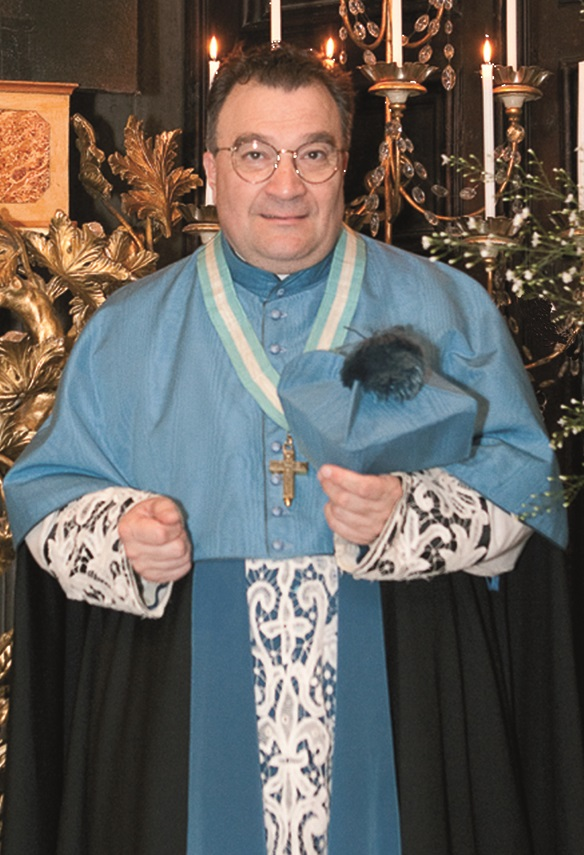
Gilles Wach, Prior general

Gilles Wach is the founder and prior general.

Philippe Mora is the co-founder and rector of the international Saint Philip Neri Seminary in Gricigliano.

Rudolf Michael Schmitz is the vicar general of the institute and provincial of the German-speaking countries.

== Choir dress ==
The institute has its own choir dress, adopted in 2006, which it received from Cardinal Ennio Antonelli, Archbishop of Florence. It consists of a rochet, mantelletta, mozzetta, pectoral cross, and biretta.

Priests, superiors, and the prior general

== Abuse allegations ==
In September 2023, the French newspaper Le Parisien released four articles about 14 confessions they received from ex-members, in which they claimed that the Institute partakes in various abuses. They alleged that superiors, especially Gilles Wach, engage in humiliating and manipulating seminarians and nuns into obedience, forcing them to act oblivious and claim there are no problems in the Institute. Seminarians were alleged to have been forced to work as servants for Institute superiors and visiting prelates.

In a February 2014 report, Sister Chantal-Marie Sorlin, of the Bishops' Conference of France office against sectarian deviations, relayed testimonies allegedly describing a cult of personality around the Fr. Wach, criticism of the modern Church, isolation from the outside world, and inconsistent evangelical behavior among leaders within the Institute of Christ the King Sovereign Priest. In 2023, Bishop Jean-Luc Brunin of Le Havre, head of the BCF’s group on sectarian influence, referred to the ICRSP as a “serious case” with “numerous dysfunctions,” and alleged signs of sectarian drift.

The allegations were denied by Institute superiors, including Fr. Wach, claiming that the journalist failed to research the topic adequately, and that the articles are biased, saying, "... many questions which you have asked me... seem more like a copy-pasted pamphlet than a serious inquiry. ".

== See also ==
- consecrated life
- institute of consecrated life
- religious institute
- secular institute
- vocational discernment in the Catholic Church
