= Rudolf Michael Schmitz =

German Catholic priest and Monsignor

The Very Reverend Monsignor Rudolf Michael Schmitz ICKSP
- Vicar General of the Institute of Christ the King Sovereign Priest
- Church: Roman Catholic Church

Orders
- Ordination: 10 October 1982 by Joseph Ratzinger

Personal details
- Born: 22 March 1957 Eitorf, North Rhine-Westphalia, West Germany
- Denomination: Roman Catholic

Rudolf Michael Schmitz (born 22 March 1957, in Eitorf, North Rhine-Westphalia) is a German Catholic prelate. He is currently the Vicar General for the Institute of Christ the King, Sovereign Priest.

Schmitz was ordained a priest on 10 October 1982 by Cardinal Joseph Ratzinger (future Pope Benedict XVI), and obtained a doctorate in dogmatic theology in 1988. He served as an assistant lecturer at LMU Munich from 1993 to 1995 before being assigned to the Apostolic Nunciature to Kyrgyzstan and working as a professor at the Kyrgyz-Russian Slavic University in Bishkek. In 2000, he became District Superior for the ICKSP in the United States.
