= Viktor Klutho =

American architect

- Born: Germany
- Known for: Viktor Klutho, Architect

Viktor Klutho was an American architect of German descent, who designed a number of Catholic churches, schools, convents and rectories in Missouri, Illinois, and Indiana, and elsewhere.

== Personal life ==
Born in Alsace-Lorraine, Klutho emigrated to St. Louis, United States with his family at age 12. His long career began in 1885 as a carpenter; by 1887, he had formed a partnership with Frederick Boeke, known as Klutho and Boeke. In 1900, he began an independent practice of architecture and was licensed to practice architecture in Illinois by 1902.

== Works include ==
- Benedictine Hall, Shawnee, Oklahoma
- St. Francis De Sales Church, St. Louis Missouri (1908)
- The Chapel of the Monastery of the Immaculate Conception, Ferdinand, Indiana (1924)
- St. Peter Cathedral, Belleville, Illinois
- St. George Church, New Baden, Illinois
- St. Joseph Church, Freeburg, Illinois
