= G. Patrick Riley =

American artist (born 20th century)

- Born: 20th century Ada, Oklahoma, U.S.
- Education: University of Oklahoma
- Known for: Mask making, public sculpture, arts educator
- Notable work: Butterfly Trees, Healing Sculpture, Lady GaGa Thunderbolt Mask (2010), Eagle (2011)

G. Patrick Riley (born 20th century) is an American artist, art educator and mask maker from Oklahoma.

His masks have been used in productions at the Kennedy Center. His works are in the collections of the Mabee-Gerrer Museum of Art, the Oklahoma State Capitol, the Arkansas Arts Center, the AT&T collection and Lady Gaga. In 2011, the Oklahoma Supreme Court awarded Riley a commission to create an eagle sculpture, 28 feet in height, in the atrium of the supreme court building.

== Biography ==
As a four-year-old child, Riley's family would visit Fr. Gregory Gerrer's museum on the campus of St. Gregory's University in Shawnee, Oklahoma. He credits these experiences as having a significant impact on his artistic career, specifically his exposure to Tutu the mummy, the taxidermy animal collection and the African mask collection.

Riley studied at East Central University for two years from 1959 to 1961. He finished his bachelor's degree at the University of Oklahoma in 1962. He later completed his master's degree at the University of Oklahoma in 1972.

In 2010, the Ford Center commissioned Riley to design and create a mask as a gift for American actress and singer Lady Gaga. Riley purchased a copy of her biography and watched her music videos for inspiration for his design.

== Exhibitions ==
- "Celestial Connections: The Art of G. Patrick Riley, Sharon Montgomery, and Glen Henry", Mabee-Gerrer Museum of Art, September 10, 2022 – October 23, 2022
- "Magical Mystery Masks: The Art of G. Patrick Riley", Mabee-Gerrer Museum of Art, September – October 2011
- "Alumni Exhibition", Pogue Art Gallery, East Central University; August 2013

== Recognition ==
- Governor's Arts Award, Arts in Education, 1995
- Governor's Arts Award, Special Recognition, 2011
- Paseo Art Association, Lifetime Achievement Award, 2011
