= Mabee-Gerrer Museum of Art =

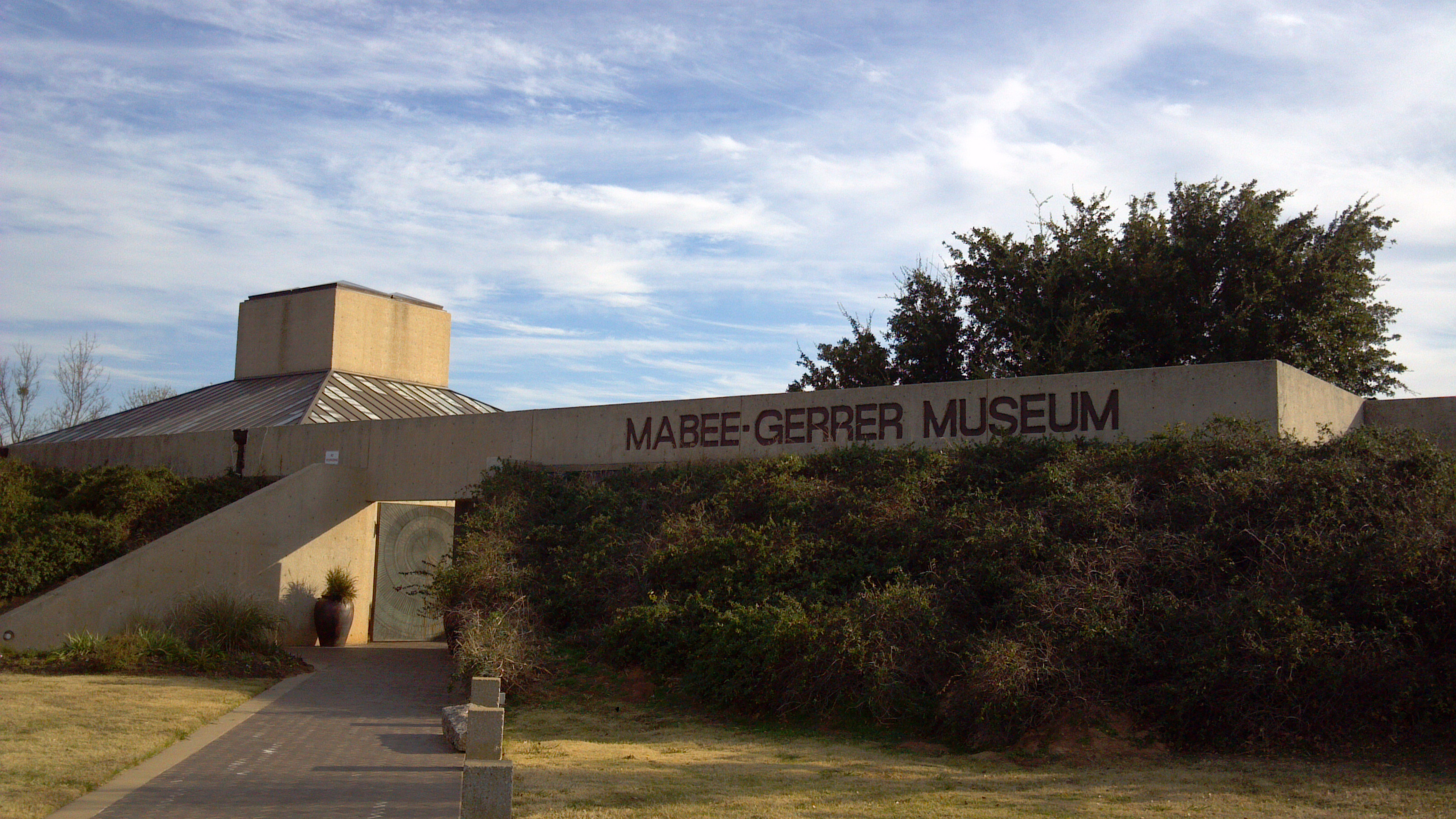

- Location within Oklahoma Location within the United States
- Established: 1919; in current building since 1979
- Location: 1900 W. MacArthur, Shawnee, Oklahoma (United States)
- Coordinates: 35.366848°N 96.953704°W
- Type: Art Museum
- Founder: Fr. Gregory Gerrer
- Website: mgmoa.org

The Mabee-Gerrer Museum of Art is a non-profit art museum in Shawnee, Oklahoma, USA. It is located on the former Oklahoma Baptist University Green Campus, being the campus of the former St. Gregory's University. In June 2024, over six years since the closing of St. Gregory's University, it was announced that the university land would return to the monks of St. Gregory's Abbey. The museum operated independently of St. Gregory's University and Oklahoma Baptist University and survived the closure and operational changes of the campus grounds.

The museum's collection includes over 3,500 artworks, and spans over 8,000 years of art, and represents cultures from around the world including ancient Egyptian, Chinese, pre-Columbian, African, Native American, European, and American art. The museum houses the official portrait of Pope Pius X and Oklahoma's only Egyptian mummies. The museum includes a gift shop that sells educational toys, publications related to their exhibitions and arts and crafts from local artisans. The MGMoA is a member of the Oklahoma Association of Museums and a member agency of Oklahoma City's Allied Arts. From 2009 until 2020, the museum hosted the annual arts festival Arts Trek.

== History ==
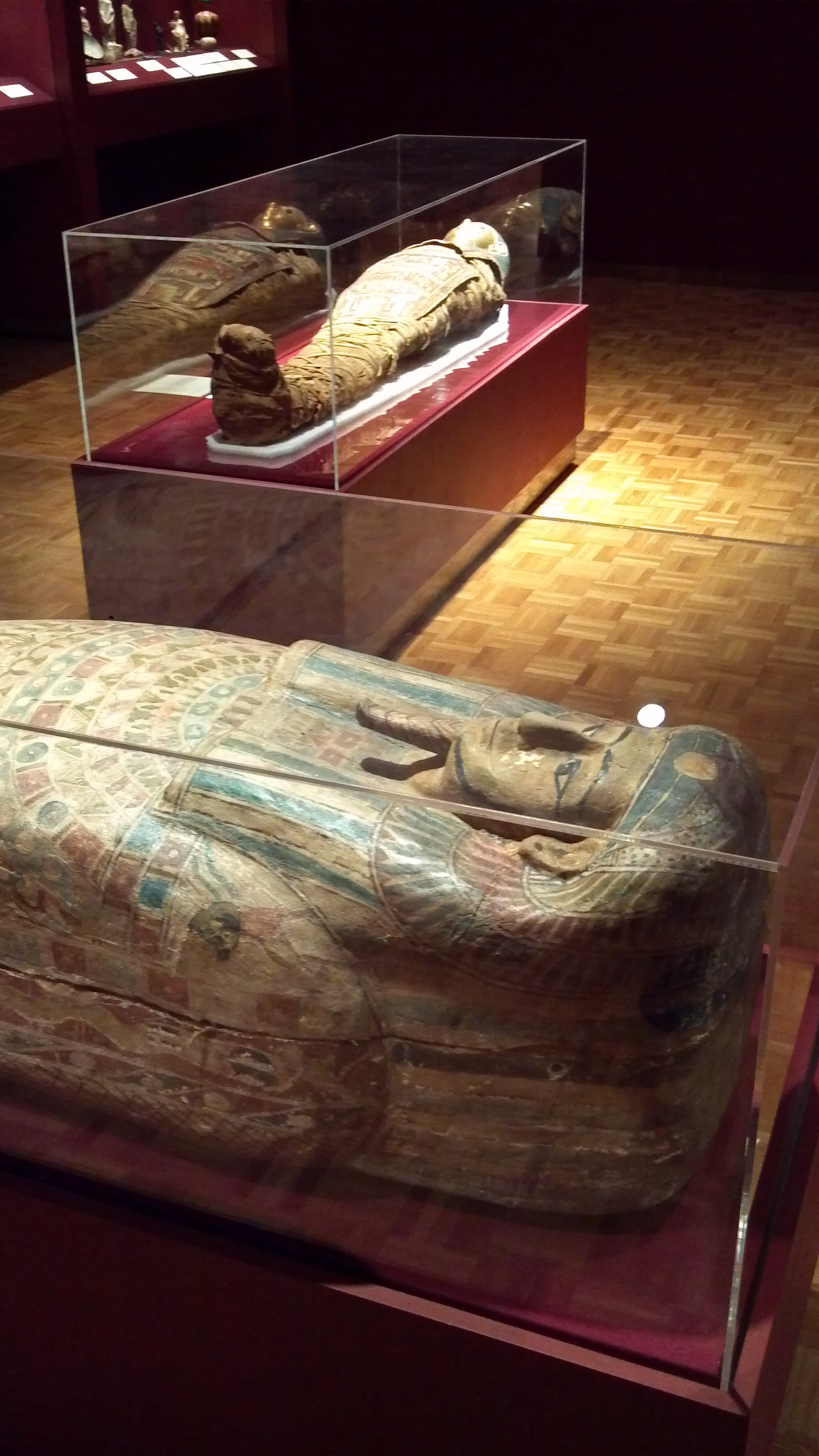
The Egyptian gallery showcases a sarcophagus, a Roman era Egyptian mummy and the mummy of a woman named Tutu who died approximately 332 BCE.

The museum is named for Fr. Gregory Gerrer, a Benedictine monk of St. Gregory's Abbey, who was an art historian and art collector. During his travels in the United States, Europe, Africa and South America, he acquired art and artifacts to exhibit in Oklahoma. In 1919, the collection moved to Benedictine Hall where it was called St. Gregory's Abbey Art Gallery and Museum. G. Patrick Riley visited the museum as a child in the early 1940s, and credits these visits as his inspiration to become an artist. In 2022, a large sculpture by Riley and fellow artist Glen Henry entitled "Trinity Eagle" was erected in front of the museum building. Starting in 1962, the Gerrer collection was on long-term loan to the Oklahoma Science and Arts Foundation in Oklahoma City. St. Gregory's Abbey built a new building as a permanent home for the collection with matching funds from the Mabee Foundation. The Mabee-Gerrer Museum of Art opened in 1979. The building was designed by Chadsey/Architects from Tulsa, Oklahoma. An addition to this building opened in 1990 which expanded the educational programming offered by the museum.

=== Etruscan Treasures ===
The museum was the exclusive United States venue to show Etruscan Treasures, an exhibit which featured Etruscan and Roman gold work, as well as artifacts from the Vatican Museums. This was the first time that the gold jewelry, from the collection of Prince Fabrizio Alliata di Montereale, was publicly displayed. The exhibit ran from June 1 through October 31, 2004, and was featured in a documentary produced by Oklahoma's Public Television Station.

=== Mummy research ===
In August 2015, SSM Health St. Anthony Hospital - Shawnee performed CT scans on the two Egyptian mummies in the museum's collection. The mummies previously visited the same hospital in 1991 for X-rays. The scans showed that Tutu's organs had been individually mummified and placed back inside her stomach and chest cavity before she was wrapped in linen.

== Collection ==
The museum's collection began with a gift in 1903. While Fr. Gregory Gerrer was traveling in the Holy Land, he was presented with an Egyptian scarab with the hieroglyphic goose symbol on it.

The museum houses an artifact collection that includes an ancient Egyptian mummy and sarcophagus, ancient Egyptian animal mummies, Roman glass, ancient Greek pottery, ancient Chinese terracotta figures, European ivory and icons, Venetian armor, Mesoamerican stone carvings, shrunken heads, Spanish colonial paintings, and African masks and bronzes. The paintings collection includes work from Guido Reni, Tintoretto, Guercino, Bartolomé Esteban Murillo, Jean-Léon Gérôme, William-Adolphe Bouguereau, William Merritt Chase, Albert Bierstadt and Robert Priseman.

=== Spanish Colonial art ===
The institute's holdings in Spanish Colonial art include retablos (small religious paintings, frequently on tin), wooden sculptures of saints, and paintings. One anonymous painting, Christ of Ixmiquilpan, dates to the early 19th century and captures a miraculous alter scene in Mexico City. A temporary exhibition of Spanish Colonial Art ran from April to June in 2010. The collection was shown at the Arlington Museum of Art in Arlington, Texas in a special exhibition from April 12 to May 26, 2013.

== See also ==
- Fr. Gregory Gerrer
- St. Gregory's Abbey
- St. Gregory's University
- Benedictine Hall
- Oklahoma Baptist University
