= Sacred Heart, Oklahoma =

Historic church in Oklahoma, United States

Sacred Heart
- Unincorporated community
- Location within the state of Oklahoma Sacred Heart (the United States)
- Coordinates: 35°0′4″N 96°48′33″W
- Country: United States
- State: Oklahoma
- County: Pottawatomie
- Time zone: UTC-6 (Central (CST))
  - Summer (DST): UTC-5 (CDT)

- Sacred Heart Mission Site
- U.S. National Register of Historic Places
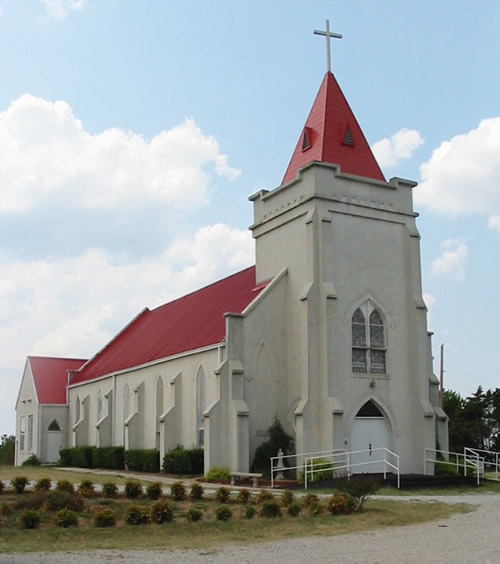
- Sacred Heart Church

- Location within Oklahoma Location within the United States
- Nearest city: Asher, Oklahoma
- Area: 640 acres (260 ha)
- Built: 1914
- NRHP reference No.: 83002125
- Added to NRHP: September 15, 1983

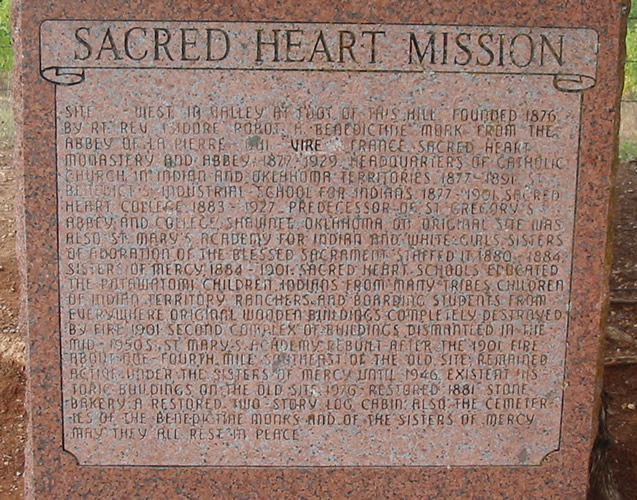
Sacred Heart Mission Historical Marker

Sacred Heart is a small unincorporated community in Pottawatomie County, Oklahoma, United States. Established in 1879 by Father Isidore Robot as a Catholic mission on the old Pottawatomie reserve, it was originally named Sacred Heart Mission. The name was changed to Sacred Heart in 1888, shortly before the area was opened to settlement by non-Indians.

The community of Sacred Heart revolved around the Sacred Heart Mission. During the early 20th century, many of its functions moved to other locations. High school and college education for boys moved in 1915 to Shawnee, to the facility that eventually became St. Gregory's University. The post office was closed in 1954. The mission site is located nine miles east of US 177 (Asher) on SH 39, then one mile north on Sacred Heart Road. The community is now considered a ghost town.

== History ==
=== Establishment ===
In October 1876, Father Isidore Robot completed a deal with the Potawotami Indians for a tribal grant of land which included the current site of Sacred Heart Mission. Pioneering the mission was difficult. On Sunday, May 13, 1877, the first Mass at Sacred Heart was celebrated. Sacred Heart was not permanently occupied until June 7, 1877, which is regarded as the true founding date of the parish.

The Saint Mary's Academy was established in 1880 for the education of girls, along with a boarding school for boys, the Sacred Heart Institute. By 1884, there was a convent, a school for the girls, stables, employees' houses, blacksmith shop, tool house, carpenter shop, and a bakery-where the Sisters baked 500 French loaves each day. A model farm - with a great variety of orchards, gardens, vineyards, fields, herds of animals and every form of agriculture was developed. The farm had two main purposes: to supply food for the institution and to provide a model for the Indian boys to copy. The mission had its own publication, the Indian Advocate, which was published from 1888 to 1910 in the bakery building. In 1884 the Sacred Heart College was established, offering secondary and tertiary education for boys, followed by boys' elementary education in 1926.

=== 1901 fire ===
On the night of January 15, 1901, a fire broke out in the dining room of the Indian Boys School and swept out of control. Before it was over the blaze had destroyed the monastery, boys' school, college, girls' school, convent, and the church. Historical news accounts report that no one was killed, but the entire mission was destroyed with the exception of a few small buildings. The bakery and the two-story log cabin are the only buildings that remain today. Temporary wooden buildings were set up to carry on the boys' school, while the Sisters of Mercy moved one-quarter of a mile southeast to create a new St. Mary's Academy. Mass was celebrated in a converted granary. The present church was begun in 1905, but was not completed until 1914.

By 1910, the Benedictines went on from Sacred Heart to build St. Gregory's College, what later became St. Gregory's University, in Shawnee. A large Tudor-Gothic structure, Benedictine Hall, was under construction there by 1913, opening its doors for high school and college students for its first term in 1915. An elementary school for boys continued at Sacred Heart until 1926. Sacred Heart remained as their motherhouse for many years, until its transfer to Mt. Saint Mary's in Oklahoma City. The transfer of the educational and monastic endeavors to St. Gregory's College was complete by the early 1930s. The Sisters of Mercy founded numerous educational and medical facilities across the state, including St. Mary's Academy (now Mount St. Mary High School) and Mercy Health Center in Oklahoma City.

Sacred Heart reverted to use as a priory after all other functions had moved to St. Gregory's. The priory closed permanently in 1965. The church remains, but most other buildings have been demolished.

== Description ==
The townsite contains a number of extant buildings and ruins.

The most significant building on the site is the Sacred Heart Catholic Church, completed in 1914. It is located at the top of Bald Hill, represented as the highest point in Pottawatomie County. The church is an example of a restrained style of Gothic Revival, with a red tile roof and a stumpy front tower. Nearby are two cemeteries, one for the sisters and one for the abbey. Other buildings include one and two-story log houses dating to the late 1800s and a two-story sandstone bakery. The foundations of the school buildings and other structures are visible as well. A priest's home, parish hall and maintenance building are non-contributing structures.

The site was listed on the National Register of Historic Places on September 15, 1983.

== Notable people ==
- Tony Hillerman, mystery novelist, was born in Sacred Heart.
