= St. Gregory's Abbey (Oklahoma) =

Benedictine monastery in Shawnee, Oklahoma

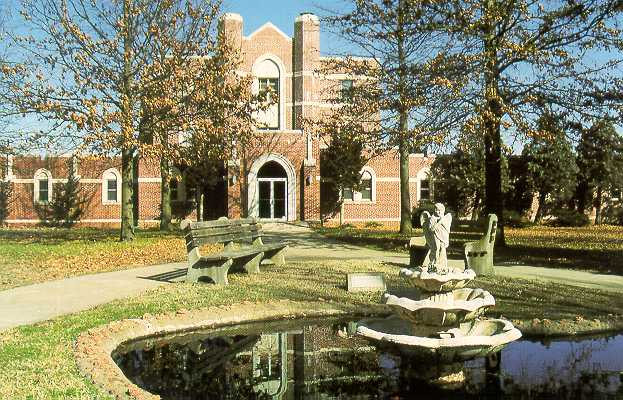
- Saint Gregory's Abbey

- Location within Oklahoma Location within the United States

Monastery information
- Order: Benedictines
- Established: 1876
- Diocese: Archdiocese of Oklahoma City

People
- Founders: Rev. Isidore Robot, O.S.B.
- Abbot: Rt. Rev. Lawrence Stasyszen, O.S.B.
- Prior: Very Rev. Simeon Spitz, O.S.B.
- Archbishop: Most. Rev. Paul S. Coakley

Architecture
- Functional status: Abbey

Site
- Coordinates: 35°22′05″N 96°57′12″W
- Saint Gregory's Abbey
- U.S. National Register of Historic Places
- Location: Pottawatomie County, Oklahoma
- Built: 1876
- NRHP reference No.: 75001572
- Added to NRHP: 08/15/1975

St. Gregory's Abbey is a Catholic monastery of the American-Cassinese Benedictine Congregation in Shawnee, Oklahoma. Founded by monks of the French monastery of Sainte-Marie de la Pierre-qui-Vire in 1876, the abbey was originally located in present-day Konawa, Oklahoma and called Sacred Heart Abbey. The abbey's school, St. Gregory's University, closed in 2017.

== History ==
Benedictine monks first arrived from France in 1873, settling in Louisiana. They relocated to what was then Indian Territory in October 1875 at the suggestion of the Archbishop of New Orleans, Napoléon-Joseph Perché. He recruited his compatriots to provide pastoral care to the Native Americans of the region who had recently become a part of his ecclesiastical province. In 1876 the monks founded Sacred Heart Abbey in what today is Konawa, Oklahoma, led by the Rev. Dom Isidore Robot, O.S.B., who had been appointed Prefect Apostolic of the Indian Territory of Oklahoma by the Holy See upon the recommendation of Perché.

The monastic community grew steadily until 1901, when a fire destroyed much of the abbey. At the invitation of the city, the monks built their new monastery in Shawnee. At that time, they also established St. Gregory's College and High School, which was known as St. Gregory's University until it closed in 2017. The main building, known as Benedictine Hall, still stands (along with other former campus buildings), and is now owned by the Abbey after briefly being part of Oklahoma Baptist University's Green Campus. They Abbey and former college grounds are listed in the National Register of Historic Places listings in Pottawatomie County, Oklahoma.

== See also ==
- Rev. Gregory Gerrer, OSB
