= Gregory Gerrer =

American priest and artist

Rev. Gregory Gerrer, OSB
- Born: July 23, 1867; Lautenbach, Alsace
- Died: August 24, 1946 (aged 79); Oklahoma
- Other name: Robert Francis Xavier Gerrer
- Education: Sacred Heart College
- Church: Roman Catholic Church
- Ordained: September 19, 1900 at Buckfast Abbey
- Offices held: Founder and Director, St. Gregory’s Museum and Art Gallery

Rev. Gregory Gerrer, OSB (July 23, 1867 – August 24, 1946) was a Benedictine Priest at Sacred Heart Abbey (later, St. Gregory's Abbey), artist, art historian and museum founder.

== Art career ==
From 1900 to 1904, Gerrer studied art in Rome. Shortly after the election of Pope Pius X, Gerrer participated in a competition of artists to paint the official portrait of the new pope. When Pius saw the finished portrait by Gerrer, he selected it to be his portrait. Pius said that he choose it because the artist painted him true to life and did not minimize his facial warts.

Gerrer also painted portraits of two World War I Choctaw code talkers: Otis Leader and Joseph Oklahombi.

The largest collection of his paintings is at the Mabee-Gerrer Museum of Art in Shawnee, Oklahoma. Gerrer founded the museum in 1919 and it was later renamed in his honor. His work is also in the Vatican art collection, Rome, Snite Museum of Art in South Bend, Indiana, and Fred Jones Jr. Museum of Art in Norman, Oklahoma.

Gerrer was a co-founder and first president of the Association of Oklahoma Artists.

== Notable portraits ==
- Pope Pius X
- Joseph Oklahombi
- Otis Leader
- John Benjamin Murphy

== Honors ==
Gerrer was inducted into the Oklahoma Hall of Fame in 1931.

The University of Notre Dame conferred an honorary Doctor of Laws degree to Gerrer.
