= Benedictine Hall (Shawnee, Oklahoma) =

Historic college building in Oklahoma, United States

- St. Gregory's Abbey and College
- U.S. National Register of Historic Places
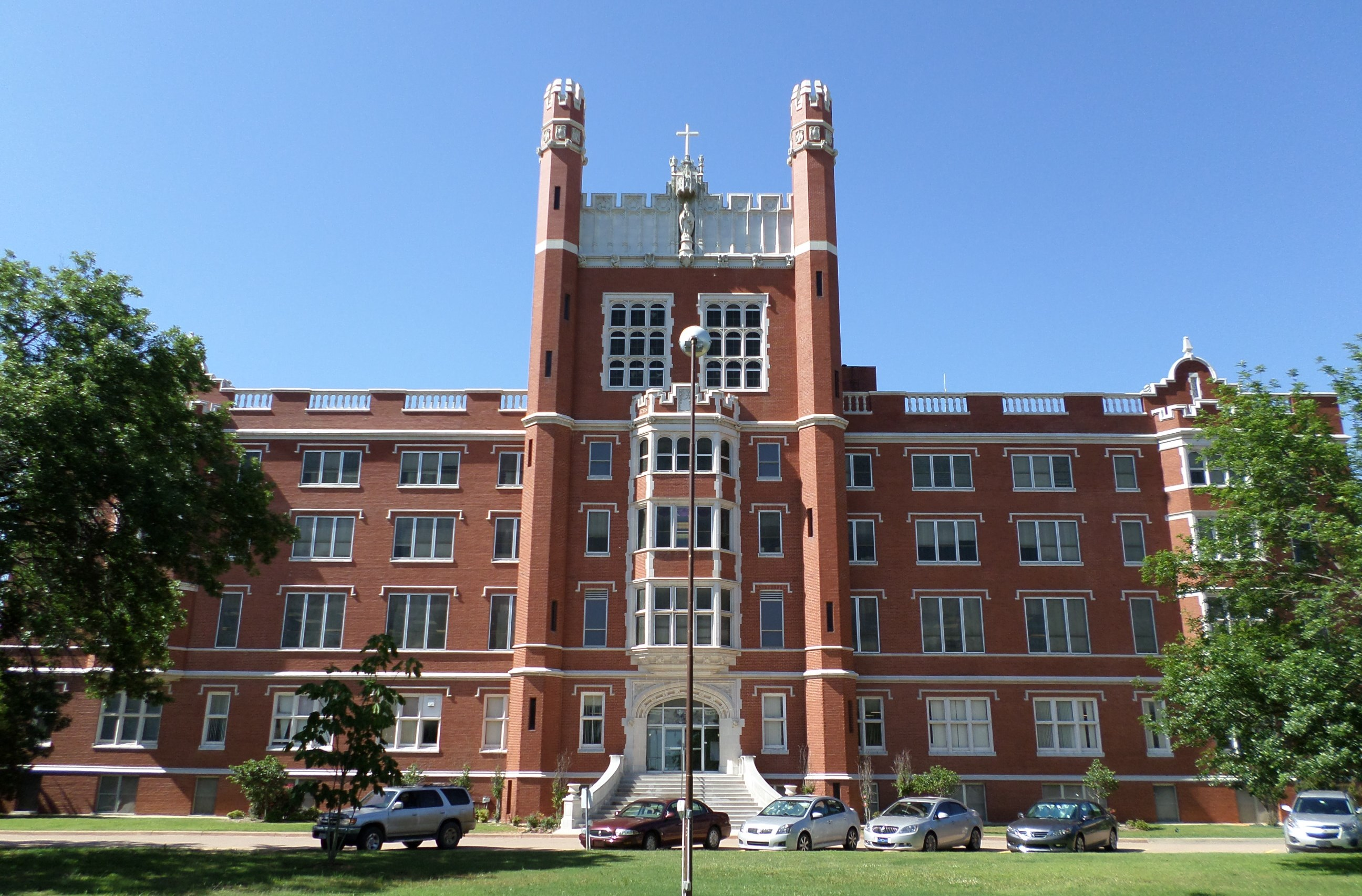
- Benedictine Hall in May 2015, after the renovation of the turrets

- Location within Oklahoma Location within the United States
- Location: 1900 W. MacArthur Dr., Shawnee, Oklahoma
- Coordinates: 35°22′3″N 96°57′14″W
- Area: 1 acre (0.40 ha)
- Built: 1915
- Architect: Victor Klutho
- Architectural style: Tudor Gothic
- NRHP reference No.: 75001572
- Added to NRHP: August 15, 1975

Benedictine Hall is located on the Green Campus of Oklahoma Baptist University in Shawnee, Oklahoma. It was the central feature of the now-closed St. Gregory's University (also known as St. Gregory's Abbey and College), housing its administration, library and most of its classes. Designed by St. Louis architect Victor Klutho, the facility opened in the fall of 1915.

St. Gregory's College grew from the Sacred Heart Mission in Sacred Heart, Oklahoma. Established in 1876 in what was then called Indian Territory, the mission school considered moving to a more populated area in the 1890s. After a 1901 fire that destroyed much of what was then called the "Catholic University of Oklahoma", the decision was made to move the high school and college to Shawnee, 35 miles (56 km) to the north. Viktor Klutho was hired to design the new facility. A specialist in Tudor Revival architecture, Klutho designed a massive five-story brick building to combine church, school and abbey in a single edifice, opening to 40 boys in the fall term of 1915. This served until the 1940s when a new church was built nearby, and in the 1950s the abbey moved to a new campus adjoining the school. In the 1960s the school discontinued high school education and admitted women to the college.

== Description ==
The college required a fireproof structure, so the new school was built of reinforced concrete, and surplus railroad rails from the Rock Island Railroad used in the foundation. The concrete walls were faced with brick, with stone accents. The building is a solid rectangle with a footprint of 260 feet (79 m) by 90 feet (27 m). The central portion of the building is expressed as a battlemented tower, four stories high over a raised basement, with slender corner turrets. From the main mass on either side extend four-story wings on raised basements, accented by projecting three-story oriel bays. The top of the wing is accentuated by a segmental balustrade.

The main level contained administrative offices and the main entry. The second floor was occupied by the library. The third floor was classroom space and the fourth floor was reserved for science laboratories and classrooms. The large space within the fifth floor tower was originally a gymnasium, now a lecture hall. The basement housed support facilities. In 1967, a proposal to demolish the building was rejected due to the potential costs to raze such a solid structure. It was renovated, adding a T-section concrete stair tower to the exterior of the west side. The building housed most of what became St. Gregory University's classes.

== 2011 Oklahoma earthquake ==
Benedictine Hall was damaged by the 2011 Oklahoma earthquake. One turret collapsed immediately following the quake. In the days that followed the earthquake, one of the turrets had to be pushed down, and the other two were removed brick by brick.

More than 3,400 donors from around the world contributed roughly $2.5 million to help the school reconstruct the turrets.

Timberlake Construction and Advanced Masonry, both of Oklahoma City, were charged with the task of rebuilding the turrets – this time with steel "bones" that could withstand an earthquake.

The decorative aspects of the towers were faithfully recreated. The brick was matched to the rest of the building, and the grotesques and shields that were part of the original gothic architecture were molded in the exact image of their predecessors. The new turrets were officially blessed during Homecoming on November 9, 2013.

== Sale of the building ==
In December 2018 the sale to Hobby Lobby of the Shawnee campus of St. Gregory's University, including Benedictine Hall, was approved by the bankruptcy court. The campus was leased to Oklahoma Baptist University, a private Christian liberal arts university in Shawnee. In May 2019, OBU renamed the tract as the OBU Green Campus, both in honor of the Green family, owners of Hobby Lobby, and because the color green is one of OBU's official university colors. In December 2019, Hobby Lobby and the Green family donated the campus to OBU.

== Historic listing ==
As part of the former St. Gregory's Abbey and College, Benedictine Hall is on the National Register of Historic Places listings in Pottawatomie County, Oklahoma.
