= Isidore Robot =

French-born American priest (1837–1887)

Dom Isidore Robot OSB
- Apostolic Prefect of the Indian Territory, Oklahoma
- Church: Catholic Church
- See: Prefecture Apostolic of the Indian Territory, Oklahoma
- In office: May 14, 1876—February 15, 1887
- Predecessor: none
- Successor: Ignatius Jean, O.S.B.

Orders
- Ordination: 1862

Personal details
- Born: July 18, 1837 Tharoiseau, Yonne, France
- Died: February 15, 1887 (aged 49) Dallas, Texas, United States

Isidore Robot, OSB (July 18, 1837 – February 15, 1887) was a French-born missionary of the Catholic Church who served as Apostolic Prefect of the Indian Territory, Oklahoma from 1876 to 1887. He was a member of the Benedictines.

== Biography ==
=== Early life ===
Born July 18, 1837, at Tharoiseau, Yonne, France, Dom Isidore Robot, O.S.B., entered the nearby Benedictine monastery of Sainte-Marie de la Pierre-qui-Vire. He was professed as a monk in 1859 and ordained a priest in 1862.

After the fall of Emperor Napoleon III in 1870, anticlerical laws enacted under the French Third Republic began closing convents and monasteries throughout France. As Robot's monastery was among those threatened, he and a companion, Brother Dominic Lambert, were sent by their abbot to find a place of refuge for the community. They left for the United States, arriving in French-speaking Louisiana in 1873, seeking a fresh start.

=== Prefect of Indian Territory ===
At that time, the spiritual care of the newly established Indian Territory was under the supervision of the Diocese of Little Rock in Arkansas. The Archbishop of New Orleans, the Most Rev. Napoléon-Joseph Perché, in whose ecclesiastical province the whole region lay, recommended to the Sacred Congregation for the Propagation of the Faith that Robot and his monastic community take charge of this region as a Prefecture Apostolic, a quasi-independent jurisdiction.

With this charge, Robot and Lambert arrived in the territory in October 1875 and established themselves in the town of Atoka. They were the first Catholic missionaries to settle permanently in Oklahoma. They were not, however, the very first, as the town was the site of the first Catholic church in the Territory, which, under the patronage of Saint Patrick, had been founded in 1872 by the Rev. Michael Smyth, assisted by his brother, the Rev. Lawrence Smyth, who were natives of Ireland. The church was built by and for the Irish-born workers of the Missouri–Kansas–Texas Railroad who lived in the town and various local residents, including a leader of the Choctaw, Benjamin Franklin Smallwood. The Prefecture was formally erected by the Holy See as of 14 May 1876, and the official documents were sent from the Vatican in July 1876, reaching Robot two months later.

One of Robot's principal concerns continued to be a new monastery for his French brethren. To this end, he obtained a section of land from the Potawatomi Nation in exchange for his promise of a church and school. Here he laid the foundation for what would become Sacred Heart Mission and Abbey (today the Abbey of St. Gregory), in present Pottawatomie County. In 1880 he obtained five Religious Sisters from New Orleans to teach in his school for girls. In 1884 these were replaced by Sisters of Mercy from Lacon, Illinois, whose ministry in Oklahoma has continued ever since.

As a missionary, Robot's focus was on American Indians, especially the Potawatomis and the Osages, and the coal miners working for the Choctaw Nation. These last were a polyglot mixture, with Irish and Italians predominating. In 1884 he opened Oklahoma's second Catholic parish church, Our Lady of Good Counsel, at Lehigh.

A brusque and uncompromising man, Robot seems to have alienated parishioners and fellow monks alike. Replaced as monastic superior in 1882 (though not as prefect), he moved in 1884 to McAlester, where he built a cabin that served as a chapel and residence. Through all the years of his leadership of the Territory, Robot maintained the ascetic regimen of monastic life, rising for prayer at 3 A.M. and fasting constantly. In 1885 he established parishes at Krebs and Savanna.

In late 1884 Robot attended the Third Plenary Council of Baltimore, one of the defining gatherings by American bishops for the Catholic Church in the United States. From there he traveled to Rome, where he submitted his resignation as Prefect. He then returned to McAlester. In 1887 his resignation was finally accepted, and his replacement, Dom Ignatius Jean, O.S.B., arrived from France in November.

=== Death ===
Robot died on February 15, 1887, in Dallas, Texas, where he was visiting a friend. He was buried in the parish cemetery at Krebs, but in 1900 his remains were transferred to the monastic cemetery at Sacred Heart Abbey.

Catholic Church titles
Preceded by Prefecture Erected	Prefect of Indian Territory; 1876—1887	Succeeded by Ignatius Jean OSB
