= Otis Leader =

Choctaw Nation of Oklahoma soldier (1882–1962)

Otis Wilson Leader
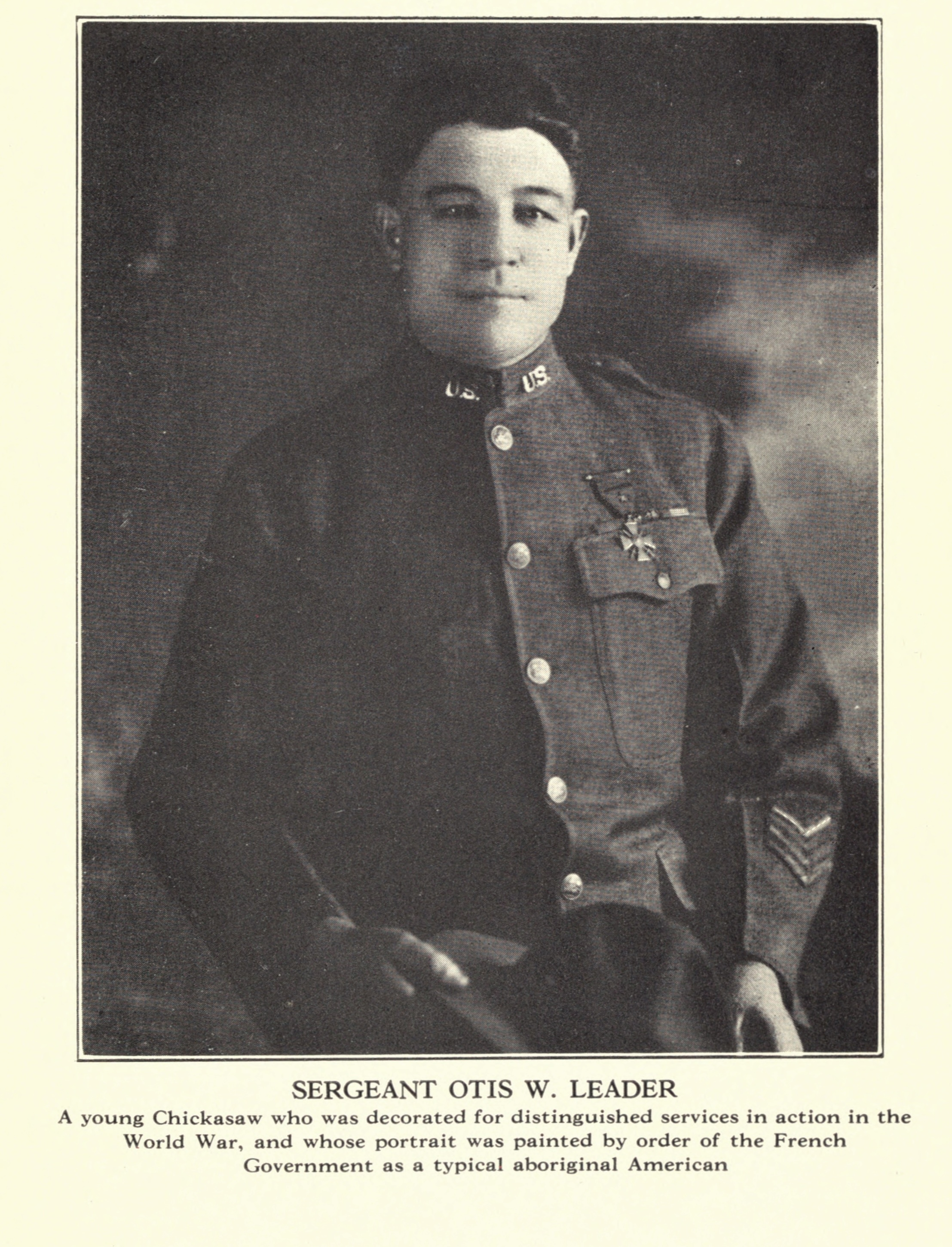
- Born: November 5, 1882; Atoka County, Choctaw Nation, Indian Territory
- Died: March 26, 1961 (aged 78); Ardmore, Oklahoma
- Other name: Odis Leader

Otis Wilson Leader (November 5, 1882 – March 26, 1961) was a Choctaw Nation of Oklahoma citizen and Chickasaw descendant who served in the United States Army during World War I. A ranch foreman before the war, he was assigned to the 16th Infantry and served overseas for 27 months. He was awarded a number of medals by both the French and U.S. governments. After the war he returned to Oklahoma where he worked for the state roads department and died in a veteran's hospital at age 78.

== Early life and career ==
He was born in Indian Territory near what is now Calvin, Hughes County, Oklahoma. Raised in Lehigh, Leader had Chickasaw, Choctaw, Scottish, and Irish ancestry. One account of his life states that "Leader, although born a Chickasaw, was enrolled as a Choctaw." Indian Tribes of Oklahoma calls him "a Chickasaw who was enrolled as a Choctaw." As "Odis Leader", he is listed as half-Choctaw by Blood on the Dawes Rolls.

Leader worked as a ranch foreman before the war. His employer "worked with a Swiss company in the cattle business and traveled to Fort Worth, Texas, on business. He had been followed by immigration agents who thought he was a spy." Army Intelligence reportedly thought Leader's Swiss boss was a German spy, and Leader was a Spanish spy, and ordered them both arrested. According to a newspaper account published in the 1960s, "Fort Worth officers trailed them until Leader and his friend caught the train back to McAlester. Texas authorities wired ahead. When they got off the train here, U.S. Marshal Crockett Lee was waiting for them. But Lee and Leader were old friends. The talk about cloak and dagger activities brought a quiet chuckle from both Lee and Leader."

Leader enlisted on April 17, 1917 "as proof of his American loyalty". Leader reported for duty to Oklahoma City, May 1, was transferred to Fort Logan, Colorado, was sent from there to El Paso, Texas, and was assigned to the 16th Infantry Regiment, Company H. His first assignment was pursuing Pancho Villa across the border.

== World War I ==
The regiment sailed about June 1, 1917, arriving at St. Nazaire, France, June 25. His unit was merged into the First Division and he was assigned to Company E, Second Machine Gun Battalion. They were trained at Gondrecourt by the French mountaineers, the so-called Blue Devils. On October 21, they were sent to the vicinity of Sommerviller, which Leader remembered as "a little town, shot all to pieces." They were put in the trenches and shortly thereafter, lost three dead, five injured, and 11 prisoners to a German raid.

The second battalion of the 16th Infantry was attacked November 3 at the Marne–Rhine Canal, where Leader served with a machine gun crew. Leader was gassed in January 1918 and sent to the rear for treatment. The First Division was sent to Saint-Mihiel, and Leader was wounded at Cantigny.

On July 28, 1918, in the second battle of the Marne, at the Aisne-Marne sector, "Leader was a corporal in charge of one of the two machine gun crews, and while advancing in the face of the enemy, his entire gun crew and gun were blown off the face of the earth, he alone surviving. Recovering from shell shock, Leader seized a rifle and advanced under fire with the infantry, being lost three days from his company, and while the infantry had the attention of the Germans, Leader crawled through an oatfield, down a small branch or ditch, and in this manner worked his way in behind the enemy and was within 60 ft (18 m) of them before discovered, and having them covered with an automatic rifle, captured two machine guns, and 18 prisoners." He captured the 16 Germans while holding a French rifle that he did not know how to use that turned out to have only one bullet in it anyway. He was awarded a Silver Star for this action, which he recounted to a newspaperman in 1958:

"We were out on the gun and had been getting fire from some German guns making it hot for us. A couple of the boys came up as our relief, so this Polish boy and I decided to go get them...We took off through the field, around them to get behind them. My Polish boy got hit and fell into a shell hole, but I kept on and got in behind them. I poked the [automatic rifle taken off a dead Frenchman] over a mound of dirt thrown over the trench and yelled at them. I don't know what I said, just sort of whooped. The Germans turned around. I waved at them with one hand while keeping the gun pointed at them to get them to put up their hands. And they all went up like this. Not a one of us got hurt," on the return route through the battlefield, after which Leader deposited his captured German gun crew with the 5th and 6th Regiments of the U.S. Marine Corps.

Leader was frequently gassed and wounded twice. Leader fought and was wounded and gassed at Cantigny, May 28, 1918; fought at Soissons, Château-Thierry, July 18, 1918; fought in Saint-Mihiel Salient, September 12, 1918; fought in the Argonne Forest offensive, October 1, 1918, where he was again wounded and gassed; was cited for distinguished service, and was awarded the Distinguished Service Cross. At Argonne, he and only two others of his unit survived German bombing and gassing of their redoubt in a disused quarry; Leader received his second Silver Star for his action at that battle.

Leader spent part of his time in France as a Code Talker on the signal service, later recounting, "[The Germans would] put Russians, Italians to listen in, but they just couldn't understand Choctaw." He was in the Tuchel prisoner of war camp at Tuchola, West Prussia for a time. He was recovering from shrapnel wounds at a Meuse department hospital when the armistice was signed. He also suffered extensive mustard-gas burns. He was shipped out of France on December 8, 1918, and after rehabilitation in hospital, discharged June 6, 1919.

He was awarded the Croix de Guerre and Palm by France. The Americans awarded him two Silver Stars, the Distinguished Service Cross, nine battle stars, and a Purple Heart with clusters. He was awarded battle stars for Sommerviller, Ansauville, Piardy, Cantigny, Second Marne, St. Mihiel, Meuse-Argonne, Mouson-Sedan, and Coblenz Bridgehead. His portrait was painted twice.

== Later life and legacy ==
Leader was not a citizen of the United States at the time of his service. Native Americans were not granted U.S. citizenship until 1924.

Leader returned to the United States and worked for the Oklahoma highway department for at least 25 years. He died in a veterans hospital in 1961 at age 79 after "suffering complications from his military service".

He was posthumously honored as a Choctaw Code Talker by the United States Congress in 2013.

== Sources ==
- Barsh, Russel Lawrence (Summer 1991). "American Indians in the Great War". Ethnohistory. 38 (3). Duke University Press: 276–303. doi:10.2307/482356. ISSN 0014-1801. LCCN 57043343. OCLC 1446170208.
- Malone, James H. (1922). The Chickasaw Nation: A Short Sketch of a Noble People. Louisville, Kentucky: J. P. Morton & Co. LCCN 22024998. OCLC 2702451. OL 256329W.
