= St. Gregory's University =

Former Catholic university in Shawnee, Oklahoma, US

Coordinates: 35°22′03″N 96°57′15″W

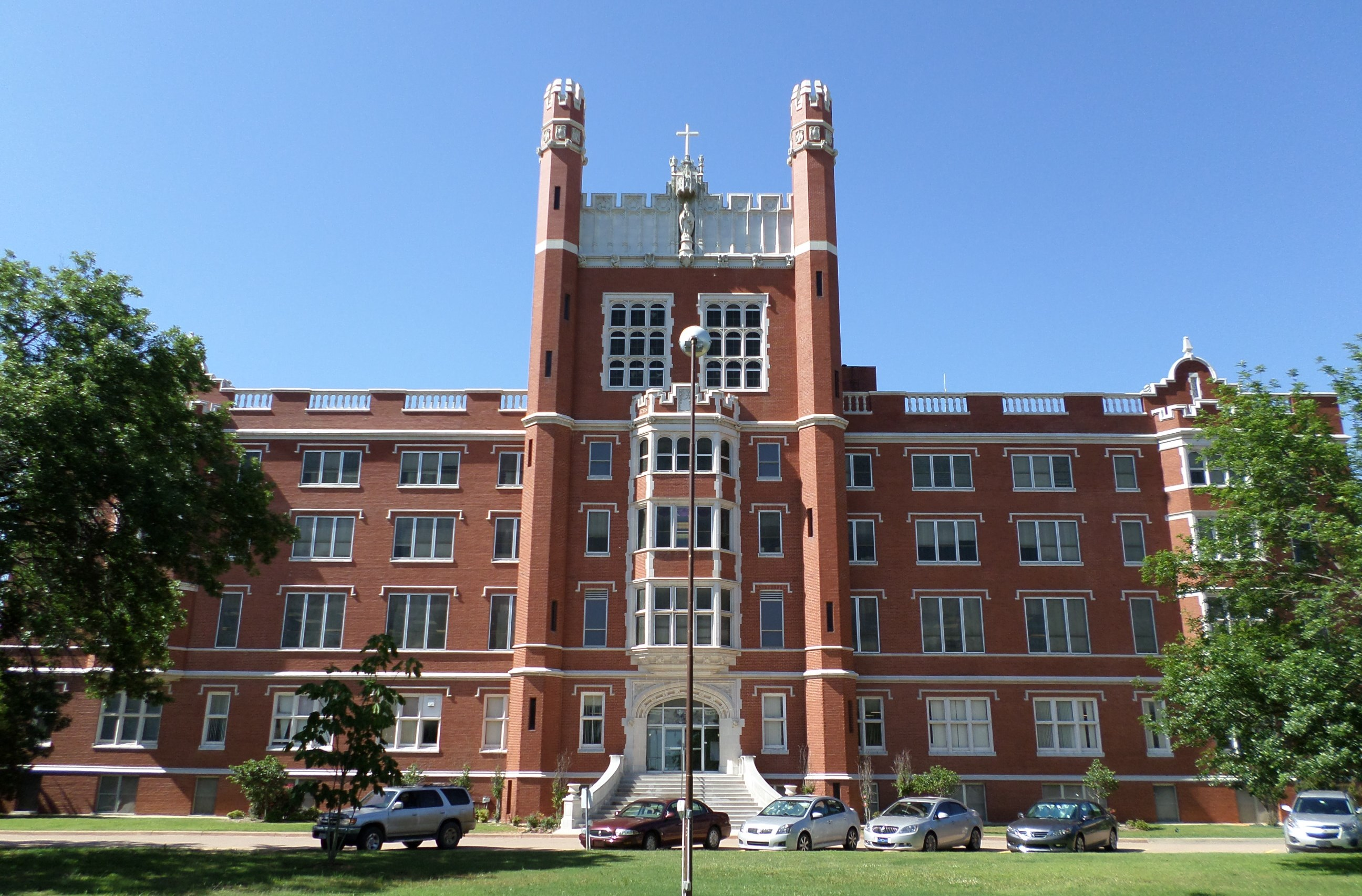
- Benedictine Hall
- Former names: Sacred Heart College (1877–1901); Catholic University of Oklahoma and St. Gregory's Abbey (1915–1922); St. Gregory's College (1922–1997)
- Type: Private university
- Active: 1875–2017
- Religious affiliation: Roman Catholic (Benedictine)
- Chancellor: Lawrence Stasyszen
- President: Michael A. Scaperlanda
- Provost: Richard L. McDowell
- Students: 692 systemwide
- Location: Shawnee, Oklahoma, United States
- Campus: Rural, 75 acres (300,000 m^{2})
- Colors: Red & Blue
- Nickname: Cavaliers
- Sporting affiliations: NAIA – Sooner (until 2017)
- Website: stgregorys.edu

St. Gregory's University, formerly Sacred Heart College and the Catholic University of Oklahoma, was a private Catholic university with its main campus in Shawnee, Oklahoma. It was one of the oldest institutions of higher learning in Oklahoma. It had an additional campus in Tulsa. The university ceased operations at the end of the fall 2017 semester. Oklahoma Baptist University became owner of the campus for a time and maintained its institutional records, but the campus was returned to its founders, the Benedictines of St. Gregory's Abbey, in 2024.

== History ==
St. Gregory's traced its roots to the Sacred Heart Mission, founded in Atoka, Oklahoma on October 12, 1875 by the Benedictine monks Father Isidore Robot, O.S.B., and Brother Dominic Lambert, O.S.B. In 1876, the mission relocated near Konawa, Oklahoma and became an abbey. Sacred Heart College was founded with the permission of the Vatican in 1877 and later gained approval from the territorial government in 1883. After a disastrous fire in 1901 that destroyed the school and the monastery, the monks accepted an offer from the town of Shawnee and began construction of the Catholic University of Oklahoma, as well as St. Gregory's Abbey, in 1910. The school opened its doors in 1915, and in 1922 the name was changed to St. Gregory's College. The monks jointly operated a high school for boys at the location until 1965. In 1927, the abbey moved from Konawa to Shawnee. The school was known as St. Gregory's College until 1997, when it changed from a junior college to a baccalaureate-conferring university known as St. Gregory's University. In 2005 St. Gregory's was accredited to offer a graduate program in business and began offering classes in March 2006.

=== 2011 earthquake ===
On November 5, 2011, a 5.8 magnitude earthquake caused damage to Benedictine Hall, the campus's central feature. One turret collapsed immediately following the quake. In the days that followed the earthquake, one of the turrets had to be pushed down, and the other two were removed brick by brick.

More than 3,400 donors from around the world contributed roughly $2.5 million to help the school reconstruct the turrets.

Timberlake Construction and Advanced Masonry, both of Oklahoma City, were charged with the task of rebuilding the turrets – this time with steel "bones" that could withstand an earthquake.

The decorative aspects of the towers were faithfully recreated. The brick was matched to the rest of the building, and the grotesques and shields that were part of the original gothic architecture were molded in the exact image of their predecessors. The new turrets were officially blessed during Homecoming on November 9, 2013.

=== Closure ===
The board of directors voted to close the university at the end of the 2017 fall semester following an unsuccessful loan application to the U.S. Department of Agriculture. The loan, around 1 million dollars, would have kept the university open for one more semester.

In December 2018 the sale of the Shawnee campus to Hobby Lobby was approved by the bankruptcy court. The campus was leased to Oklahoma Baptist University (OBU), a private Protestant university in Shawnee. In May 2019, OBU renamed the tract as the OBU Green Campus, both in honor of the Green family, owners of Hobby Lobby, and because the color green is one of OBU’s official university colors. In December 2019, Hobby Lobby and the Green family donated the campus to OBU.

=== Return to the abbey ===
In June 2024, OBU transferred the Green Campus back to St. Gregory's Abbey, in exchange for other land owned by the abbey. The abbey remains in operation at the center of the former campus, and various plans for re-development are being considered.

== Enrollment ==
St. Gregory's University served 692 students in two colleges – the College of Arts and Sciences and the College of Continuing Studies (formerly the College for Working Adults). Students in the College of Arts and Sciences were provided with a solid foundation in the liberal arts through a common core curriculum, the heart of which was the four-semester "Tradition and Conversation" program, which offered students the opportunity to engage some of the greatest minds and discuss some of most influential texts of the Western and Catholic intellectual traditions in a seminar format. The College of Continuing Studies was located in two cities – Shawnee and Tulsa – and offered accelerated, evening degree programs at the associates, bachelors and masters levels. St. Gregory's had a student/faculty ratio of 12:1.

== Campus ==
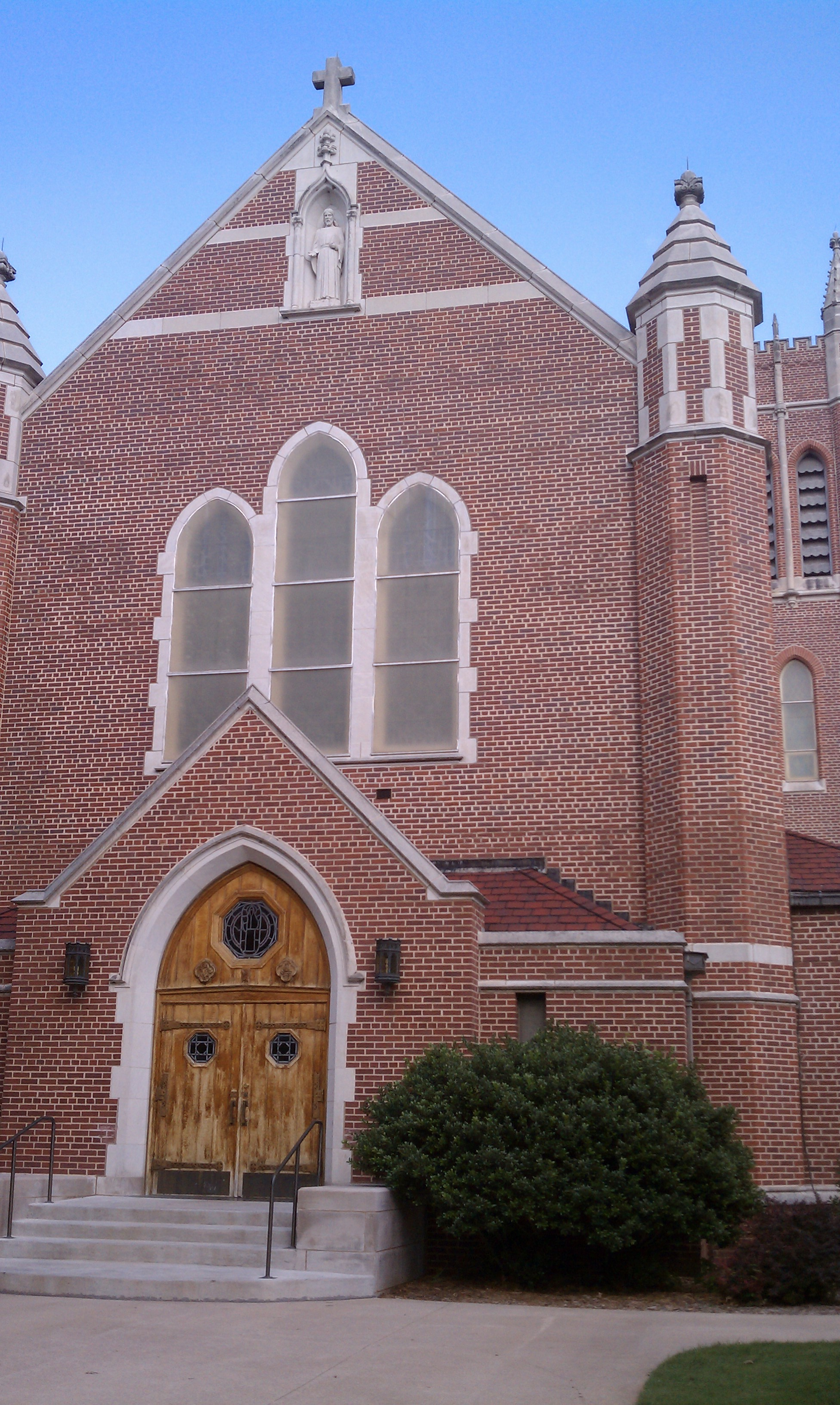
The Abbey Church

Construction on Benedictine Hall, the imposing five-story, Tudor Gothic–style structure on campus began in 1913. The earthquake damage in 2011 was repaired after several million dollars in donations enabled the reconstruction of the building's towers.

Other facilities on the campus include the Sarkeys Performing Arts Center and the Rockwood Center.

St. Gregory's Abbey retained approximately 74 acres of grounds immediately surrounding the Abbey facility at the time of the original campus transfer, and remained opened after the university closed.

St. Gregory’s Abbey and College is on the National Register of Historic Places listings in Pottawatomie County, Oklahoma.

=== Mabee-Gerrer Museum of Art ===
The Mabee-Gerrer Museum of Art is an independent non-profit art museum. While located on the former campus of the University, it operated separately and survived the school's closing. Its collection includes ancient Egyptian, medieval, Renaissance, and Hudson River School art. The museum was founded in 1914 by Rev. Gregory Gerrer, OSB. In 1919 the museum was located in Benedictine Hall. The current museum building opened in 1979.

== Athletics ==
The St. Gregory's (SGU) athletic teams were called the Cavaliers. The university was a member of the National Association of Intercollegiate Athletics (NAIA), primarily competing in the Sooner Athletic Conference (SAC) from 1998–99 to 2016–17. Prior to that, SGU was a member of the National Small College Athletic Association (today known as the United States Collegiate Athletic Association), and won the first USCAA women's soccer championship held in 1997.

SGU competed in 16 intercollegiate varsity sports: Men's sports included baseball, basketball, cross country, golf, soccer, swimming & diving and track & field; while women's sports included basketball, cross country, golf, soccer, softball, swimming & diving, track & field and volleyball. Co-ed competitive cheerleading was also offered. However, once the decision to suspend operation of the university was reached, all athletics programs were suspended immediately, including sports that were in the middle of seasons.

== Notable alumni ==
- Denise Bode – energy policy expert
- Doug Combs – associate justice of the Oklahoma Supreme Court
- Mikhael Jaimez-Ruiz – former professional soccer goalkeeper
- Stephen Aloysius Leven – former Bishop of San Angelo
