= Shawnee, Oklahoma =

Shawnee, Oklahoma Shânîheki (Meskwaki)
- City
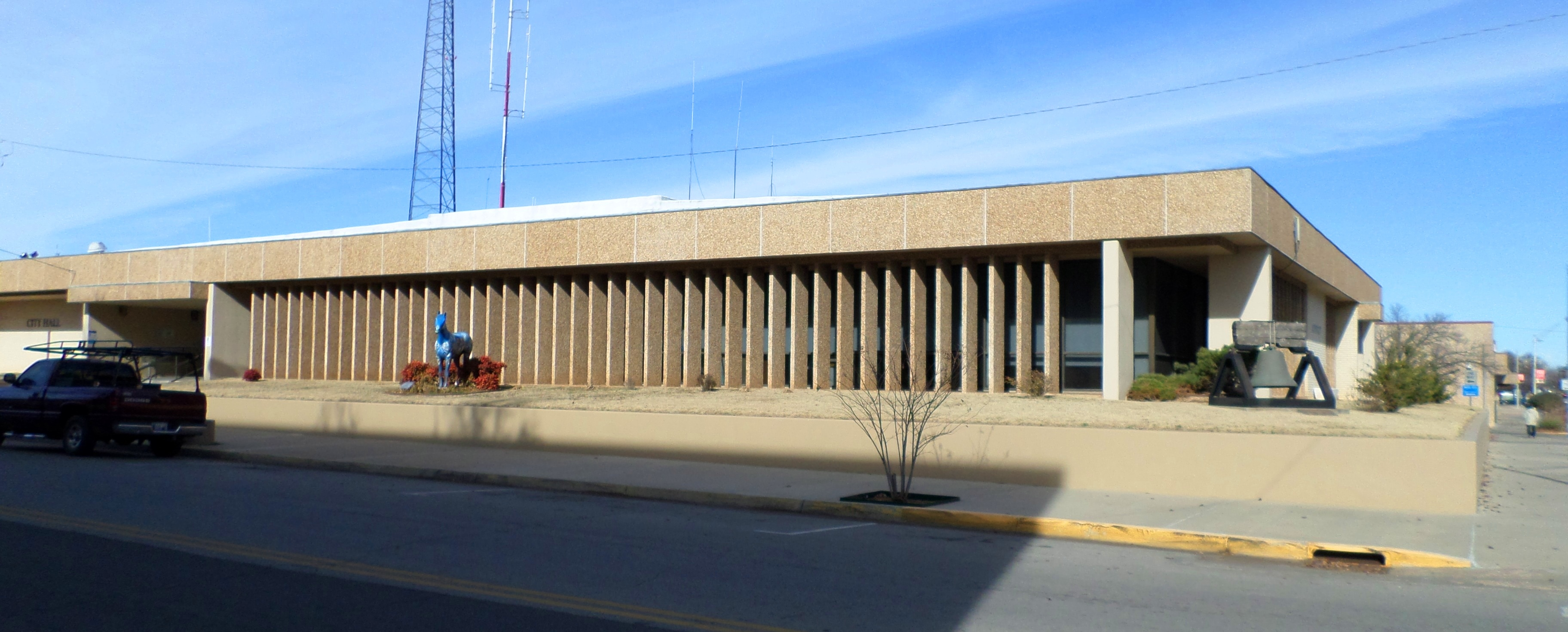
- Shawnee City Hall (2016)
- Interactive map of Shawnee, Oklahoma
- Coordinates: 35°20′33″N 96°56′2″W
- Country: United States
- State: Oklahoma
- County: Pottawatomie

Government
  - Type: Mayor-Council
  - Mayor: Eric Stephens

Area
  - Total: 40.91 sq mi (105.95 km^{2})
  - Land: 38.61 sq mi (99.99 km^{2})
  - Water: 2.30 sq mi (5.96 km^{2})
- Elevation: 1,053 ft (321 m)

Population (2020)
  - Total: 31,377
  - Density: 812.8/sq mi (313.81/km^{2})
- Time zone: UTC−6 (Central (CST))
  - Summer (DST): UTC−5 (CDT)
- ZIP codes: 74801, 74802, 74804
- Area codes: 405/572
- FIPS code: 40-66800
- GNIS feature ID: 2411879
- Website: www.shawneeok.org

Shawnee is a city in and the county seat of Pottawatomie County, Oklahoma, United States. As of the 2020 census, Shawnee had a population of 31,377. The city is part of the Oklahoma City-Shawnee Combined Statistical Area and the principal city of the Shawnee Micropolitan Statistical Area.

With access to Interstate 40, Shawnee is just under 40 miles (64 km) east of downtown Oklahoma City. To the east and northeast, Shawnee is 112 miles (180 km) from the McClellan-Kerr Arkansas River Navigation System, which provides shipping barge access to the Gulf of Mexico.

== History ==
The area surrounding Shawnee was settled after the American Civil War by a number of tribes that the federal government had removed to Indian Territory. The Sac and Fox originally were deeded land in the immediate area but were soon followed by the Kickapoo, Shawnee, and Potawatomi Indians. These federally recognized tribes continue to reside today in and around Shawnee.

Over the course of the 1870s, Texas cattle drovers pushed their herds across Indian Territory; there were four major trails, with the West Shawnee trail crossing near present-day Kickapoo and Main streets. With the cattle drives, railroads were constructed through the territory, with the government forcing tribes to cede rights of way.

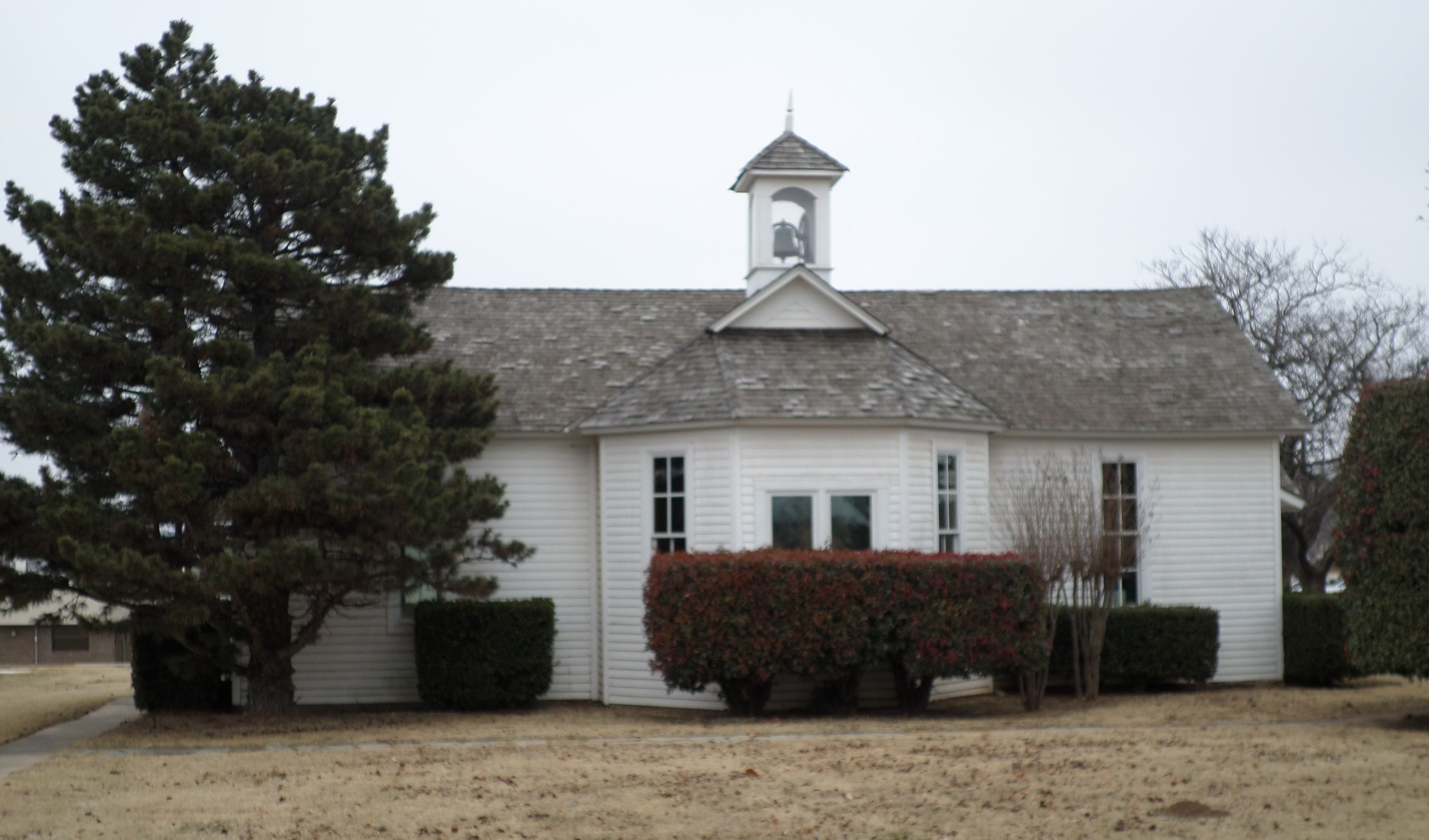
Shawnee Friends Mission, listed on the National Register of Historic Places

In addition, white settlers pressed for more land; they were encroaching on territories previously reserved by treaty to Native Americans. In 1871 a Quaker mission was established here. (The current Mission Hill Hospital is located near that site, now occupied by an historic building.) That first missionary, Joseph Newsom, opened a school in 1872. By 1876 a post office and trading post had been established a quarter mile west of the mission at what became known as Shawnee Town.

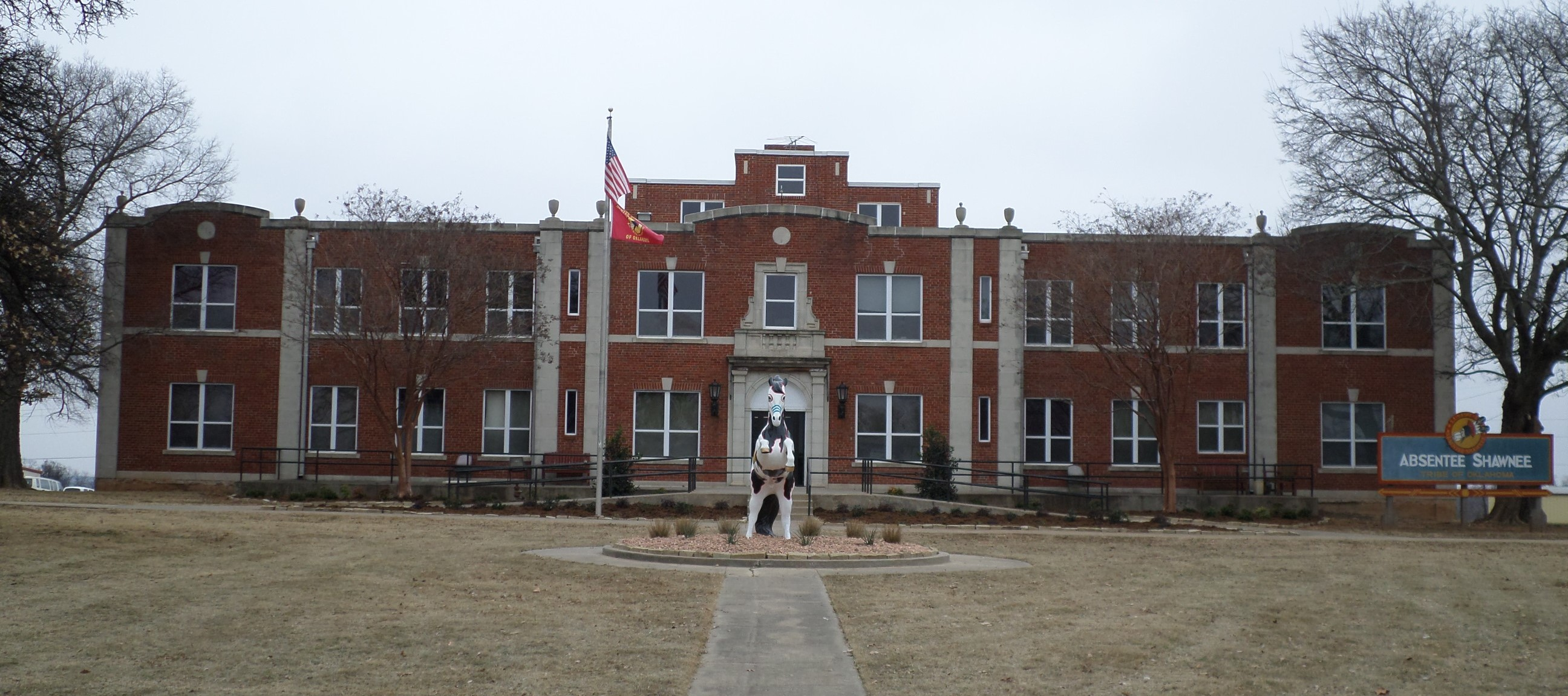
Absentee Shawnee Tribe Social Services Building, formerly the Shawnee Indian Sanitorium

Beginning in April 1889, the United States government succumbed to the pressure that had built to open the tribal lands to white settlement. It was also making policy to encourage Native Americans to assimilate into white society. By allocating communal lands to individual households and extinguishing tribal land claims, Congress was preparing the territory for eventual statehood. The end of communal holdings was also intended to be the end of traditional tribal government, to be replaced with leaders appointed by the federal government.

The Dawes Act allocated the tribes' communal lands into 160-acre plots to individual tribal members believing it would support a family farm. Tribal members were registered with records known as the Dawes Rolls established for each tribe. The government declared that tribal land in excess of what was allocated to member households was "surplus" and available for settlement by non-Native Americans. It allocated that surplus land through land runs, essentially races by which people staked claims on land. Some tribes lost parts of their communal lands, disrupting traditional governments and practices.

The first land run took place in the central area of Oklahoma Territory in 1889 known as the Unassigned Land. In the Land Run of 1891 onto surplus land of the Sac and Fox, Citizen Pottawatomie and Shawnee, just east of the original run, was opened for settlement. Prospective land owners lined up along the Kickapoo Tribe's border and Etta B. Ray was the first to dash across the line into the area designated County B. Her claim and those of John Beard, James T. Farrall, and Elijah A. Alley were to become the city of Shawnee. Etta Ray married Henry Beard, an Oklahoma City business owner, a month after the run and they came to her claim to live in the cabin that she and her family had built for them. Several names were proposed for the new city, including Brockway, Forest City and Shawneetown, after the store that was south of the townsite. Following a long discussion among early settlers who had their own ideas for the town's name, a compromise was reached. They named the town Shawnee after the tribe that had been living there. A second run, onto the Kickapoo Land to the west of the original, was held in 1895, adding more acreage added to Pottawatomie County.

In the early spring of 1895, Mr. Beard entered into an agreement with the promoters of the Choctaw, Oklahoma and Gulf Railroad (CO&G), then extending its line from Memphis, Tennessee, to Amarillo, Texas, to build through the land his wife had claimed. In consideration he gave the railway company one-half of the claim of one hundred and sixty acres. The road was built through his farm, and the City of Shawnee was founded on July 4, 1895.

For the first few years of the new century, Shawnee was undergoing a boom that came close to keeping pace with that of Oklahoma City. Located in the heart of cotton, potato, and peach country, Shawnee quickly became an agricultural center. By 1902, there were seven cotton gins in the immediate area and two cotton compresses. Between March 1901 and March 1902, 375 railroad cars of cotton product were shipped out of Shawnee, along with 150,000 bales of cotton. Feed stores, wagon yards, an overall factory, and an assortment of other businesses designed to serve the farmers as they brought their crops to market arose in Shawnee.

The population grew from 250 to 2,500 from 1892 to 1896. In 1896, the Tecumseh Railway was built from Shawnee to Tecumseh, being then the county seat; and, under later CO&G ownership, the line was extended to Asher in 1902. In 1903-1904 the Atchison, Topeka and Santa Fe Railway and the Missouri, Kansas and Texas Railway extended service to town, after being given land inducements from Henry Beard and James Farrall. Shawnee was an intended destination from Webbers Falls, Oklahoma, of the Webbers Falls, Shawnee and Western Railroad from 1911, but that line never got further west than Warner, Oklahoma.

Shawnee got electric streetcars when the Shawnee Traction Company started running a streetcar service in mid-1904. That company was in the hands of a receiver by December 1905, and on February 16, 1906 was taken over by the Shawnee-Tecumseh Traction Co. ("STT"), sometimes called the Interurban Electric Railway, which had been incorporated the day before. STT added a 6-mile interurban line to Tecumseh, Oklahoma starting service September 1, 1906, thus giving it about 12.5 miles of total trackage. By 1910 STT had 19.21 miles of total trackage, and by 1917 it had extended its North Broadway streetcar line all the way to the campus of Oklahoma Baptist University. STT abandoned its streetcar and interurban operations in January 1927. While it continued to operate busses, that service too was suspended in 1931.

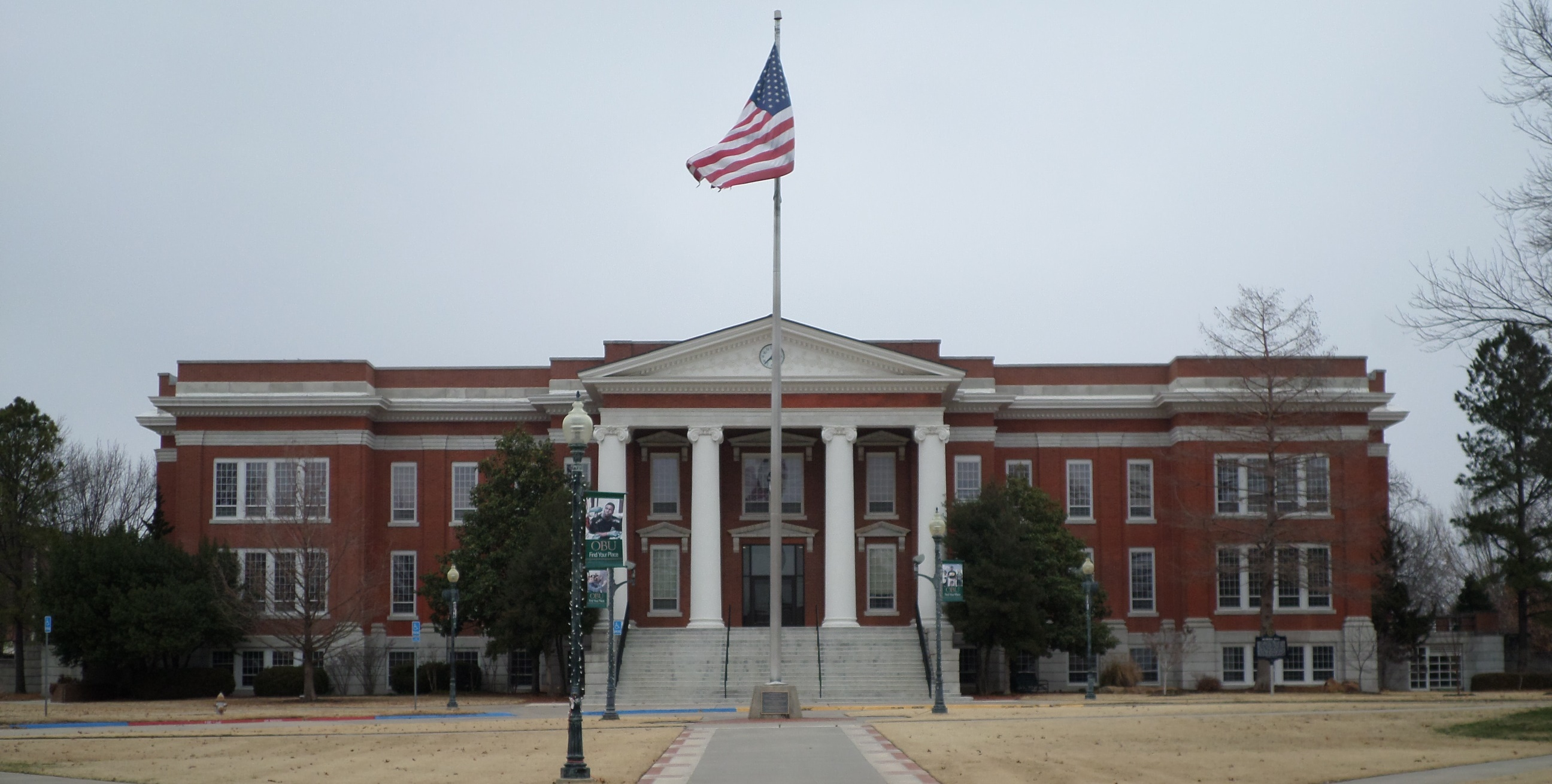
Shawnee Hall, on the campus of Oklahoma Baptist University, was completed in 1915

Oklahoma Baptist University opened in 1910. Its first building, Shawnee Hall, was a gift from the citizens. St. Gregory's College (later St. Gregory's University) relocated to Shawnee from Sacred Heart in 1915, where it had been associated with a Catholic mission and school.

On the evening of May 19, 2013, a violent EF4 tornado hit the town resulting in two deaths.

The town was struck by two high-end EF2 tornadoes in the first four months of 2023. The first one occurred on the north side of the city on February 26, although the most severe damage occurred in nearby town of Aydelotte. Both communities would be struck again on April 19 with Shawnee being struck directly. Major damage was inflicted to numerous structures, including the high school, and at the Oklahoma Baptist University campus.

=== Historic Downtown ===
Downtown Shawnee is an excellent example of many Main Street communities that emerged in the late 19th century as part of the westward movement. Choosing not to organize its activity around a central square, as did many towns in New England, the South, and upper-Midwest, Shawnee represents a distinctly western model of urban development. Depending on railroad lines for its economic health, Shawnee's Main Street became the focal point for commercial, manufacturing, and entertainment activity beginning in 1895, four years after the region was opened for European-American settlement when authorities staged a land run.

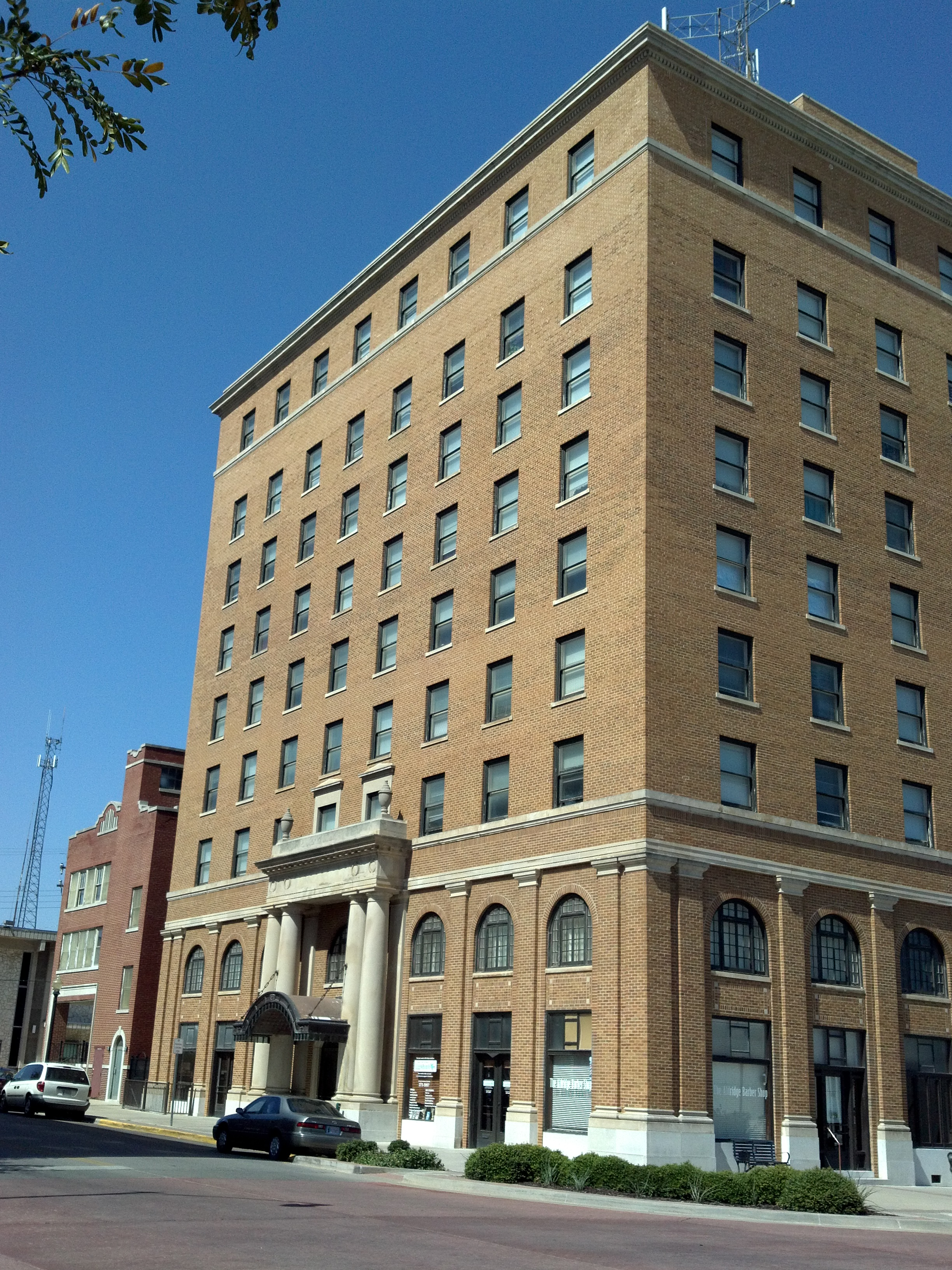
Historic Aldridge Hotel in 2012. Listed on NRHP, it is now an apartment building.

Competing with Oklahoma City as the hub of central Oklahoma, Shawnee developed a broad base of economic activity. As late as 1910, city leaders hoped that one more rail line, a meat packing plant, and the state capital might be just enough to surge ahead of its rival 30 miles to the west. However, Shawnee came in third in the statewide election to determine the capital. It lost both the railway and the meatpacking plant to Oklahoma City. The setbacks resulted in Shawnee being a small city built with services and retail developed around the activity of Main Street.

The railroad industry led the early strength of the economy. The Santa Fe Train Depot (still extant), with its unique architecture, serves as a visible reminder of the city's dependence on the train. During the early 20th century, the Rock Island Railroad and the Missouri-Kansas-Texas Railroad both had depots in the city. Shawnee's major employer was the Rock Island Railroad, which had located its main southwestern repair shops in the city in 1896. After nearly 40 years, the railroad moved its shops to El Reno in 1937, but two major buildings remain. The Santa Fe Railroad also had repair shops just south of the city. By 2000 only a large concrete tower remained, and it was demolished that year. Some of the roundhouse buildings are now used by the city for storage and technical repair.

Serving as the region's agricultural hub during much of the first quarter of the 20th century, Shawnee provided the market for farmers to sell their crops. Cotton was a major crop and Main Street was often lined with bales; mule sellers, peanut vendors, and peach growers. The building reputed to be the largest cottonseed oil mill in the Southwest is still extant; this same building later was adapted as a peanut factory to process another commodity crop. The Shawnee Flouring Mill, long integral to the city, still dominates the skyline of downtown.

The buildup of industry and the armed forces for the Second World War, and in particular the construction of Tinker Air Force Base east of Oklahoma City, benefited Shawnee's economy. At various times, Tinker has employed as many as 3,000 Shawnee residents. After the war, three major manufacturing concerns were important to Shawnee's economy. Jonco, Inc., manufactured aviation products and employed nearly 1,000 in 1958. The Sylvania Corporation produced vacuum tubes and electrical parts in its Shawnee plant and employed another 1,000. The Shawnee Milling Company, which had rebuilt after fires in 1934 and 1954, employs nearly 300 workers.

Also continuing as a nationally known company which began in 1909 is Round House Overalls. Recognized as the oldest operating manufacturing company in the state turns out more than 300,000 denim products shipped all over the world. Alvin S. Nucholls established the factory to meet the needs of the overwhelming population working for the railroads in the early days of Shawnee. The Antosh family has owned the company since 1964.

Sonic, a well-known drive-in fast food chain, originated in Shawnee. The 3000th Sonic Drive-In is also in Shawnee. Troy N. Smith, Sr. and Joe McKimmey owned the Log House Restaurant and a drive-up root beer stand called the Top Hat. In 1959 Smith and McKimmey went their separate ways and Smith opened a hamburger drive-in down Harrison Street installing a "call-in" system rather than the carhops. He dubbed his drive-in the Sonic. Both places were in existence until a fire in the Top Hat in the mid-1960s forced closure. McKimmey built the Log House Restaurant into a popular steak house and Smith sold franchises to the Sonic and has since expanded into a national drive-in food chain with now over 3,500 establishments.

Beginning in the 1970s, Shawnee's economy improved with the addition of a number of industrial plants, including Eaton Corp. and TDK north of the city; they added approximately 1,000 jobs to the community base.

In 1980 Main Street was dominated by small retail establishments in which 80 percent are housed in buildings built prior to statehood in 1907. The majority of these buildings have had their façades altered to adjust to the changing tastes in the 20th century although one block (between Philadelphia and Union streets) remains substantially unaltered reminding of how life on Main Street functioned prior to statehood.

One block west at Broadway and Main the building originally constructed as The Mammoth Department Store, has been altered very little. The building once housed Montgomery Ward and is now Neal's Home Furnishings. Before World War II, Main Street also had numerous drugstores and soda fountains serving as gathering places for young people. Today, Owl Drug, in a building operated as a drugstore since 1895, retains many old fixtures and appears much as it did during the 20th century.

Shawnee's first sky scraper, the Hilton Phillips Hotel, later known as the Aldridge, was built in 1928 at the peak of the wealth and growth generated by the oil boom of the 1920s. This stimulated development of the four-story Masonic Temple Office Building, constructed in 1929 across the 9th street from the Aldridge.

Main Street had a number of entertainment facilities. A convention hall attracted well-known celebrities of the 1910s and 1920s, such as Sarah Bernhardt but was razed by 1930 for a bus company barn. An opera house on Market and Main was the site of many memorable events. The early movies theaters are now gone except the Ritz Theater, which was the oldest continuously operating theater in Oklahoma until the theater's closure in 1989. It continues to be used for "live shows." The Bison Theater building remains but after being used as an antique shop it's now empty. Downtown Shawnee has lost many buildings of historical value, but still retains a significant number of resources. These provide a living reminder of the retail and human scale of Main Street in the late 19th and early 20th centuries.

=== Santa Fe Depot ===
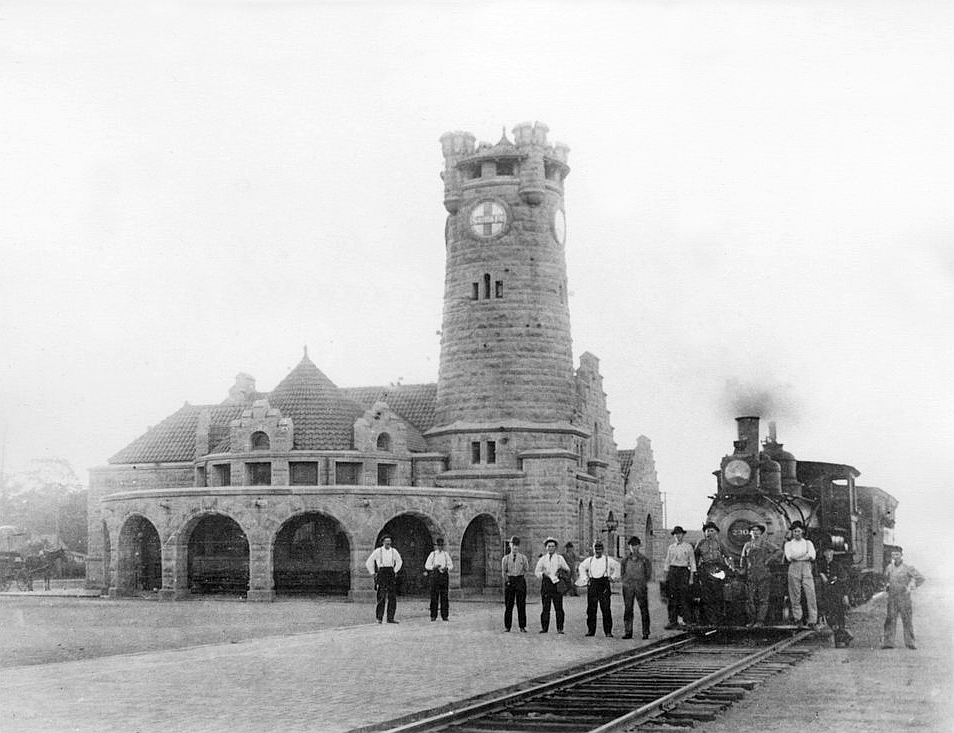
Santa Fe depot in Shawnee, circa 1890-1900

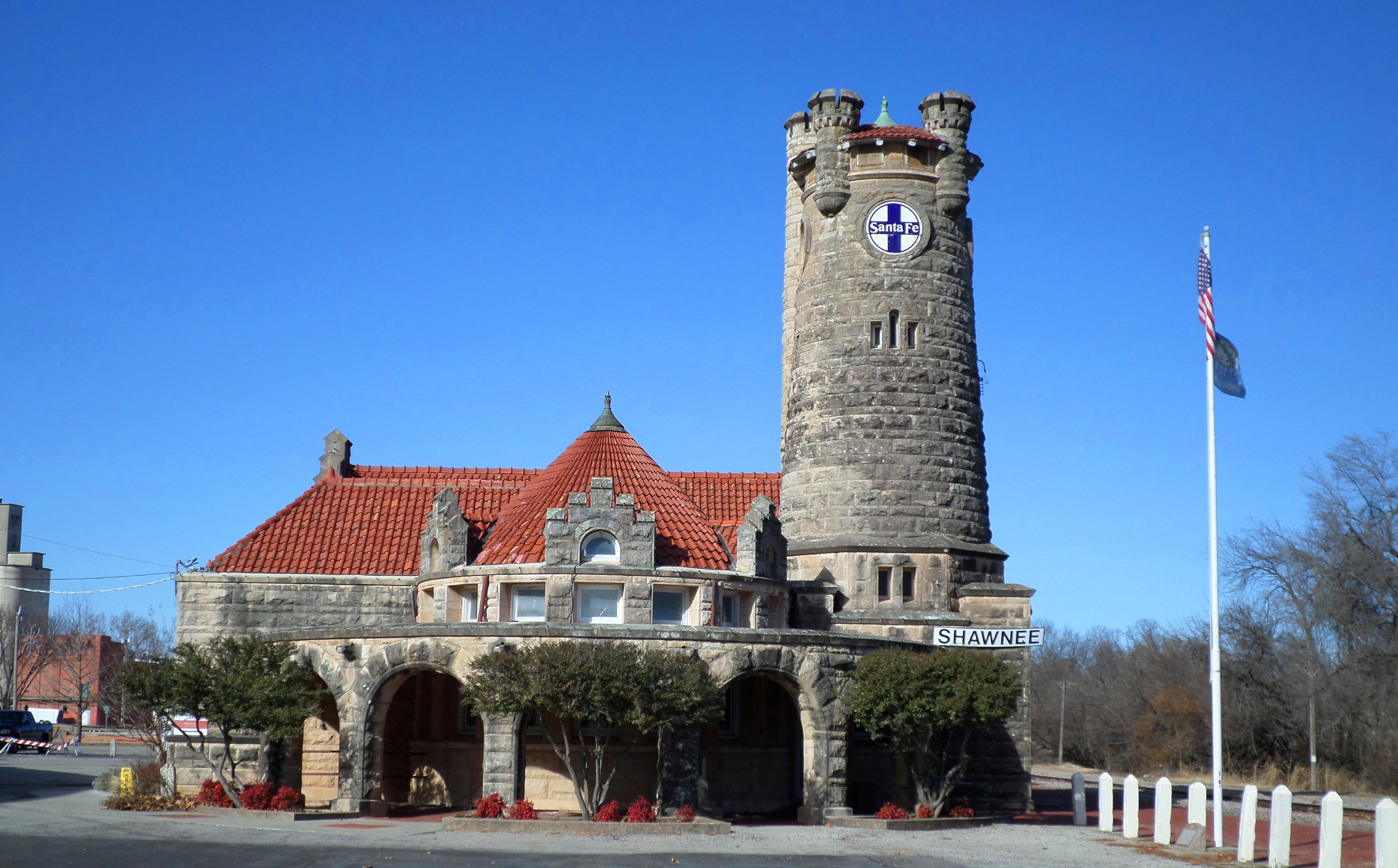
The former Santa Fe Depot in Shawnee, 2016. It is now used as a museum.

Located at 614 E. Main in Shawnee is a unique railroad depot made of limestone blocks two to three-feet deep. With a 60 ft. turret, it takes on the slight appearance of a castle, contrasting with the surrounding architecture. It was built in 1902 and was placed on the National Register of Historic Places in 1974. After operations of the Santa Fe Railroad ceased in 1971 the City of Shawnee took over the depot property. It was assigned to the Pottawatomie County Historical Society which began restoration of this depot in 1979, after it had stood vacant for two decades. The building was remodeled into a railroad and historical museum, which opened on May 30, 1982. It contains numerous local artifacts from the settlement of Shawnee, as well as railroad memorabilia and a gift shop. The Board of Directors is currently erecting a new building directly north of the old depot. The 100+ year old depot will then house railroad artifacts while other items will be displayed in the new area.

=== Benson Park ===
Located midway between Shawnee and Tecumseh, Benson Park served the recreational needs of Shawnee residents for about 20 years. It had a stop on the interurban streetcar that ran between the two towns to the park. Built by the railroad to encourage citizens to travel by rail it opened in 1907. The park had a lake for boating, an opera house, skating rink, roller coaster, large picnic areas and later a swimming pool known as The Plunge. The arrival of automobiles which most families could then afford plus the financial distress in the late '20s forced closure soon after 1930 although the pool and the picnic areas were still briefly in use. As of 2016, the space that was once the park is on private property and occupied by a large pecan orchard.

=== Pottawatomie County Seat dispute ===
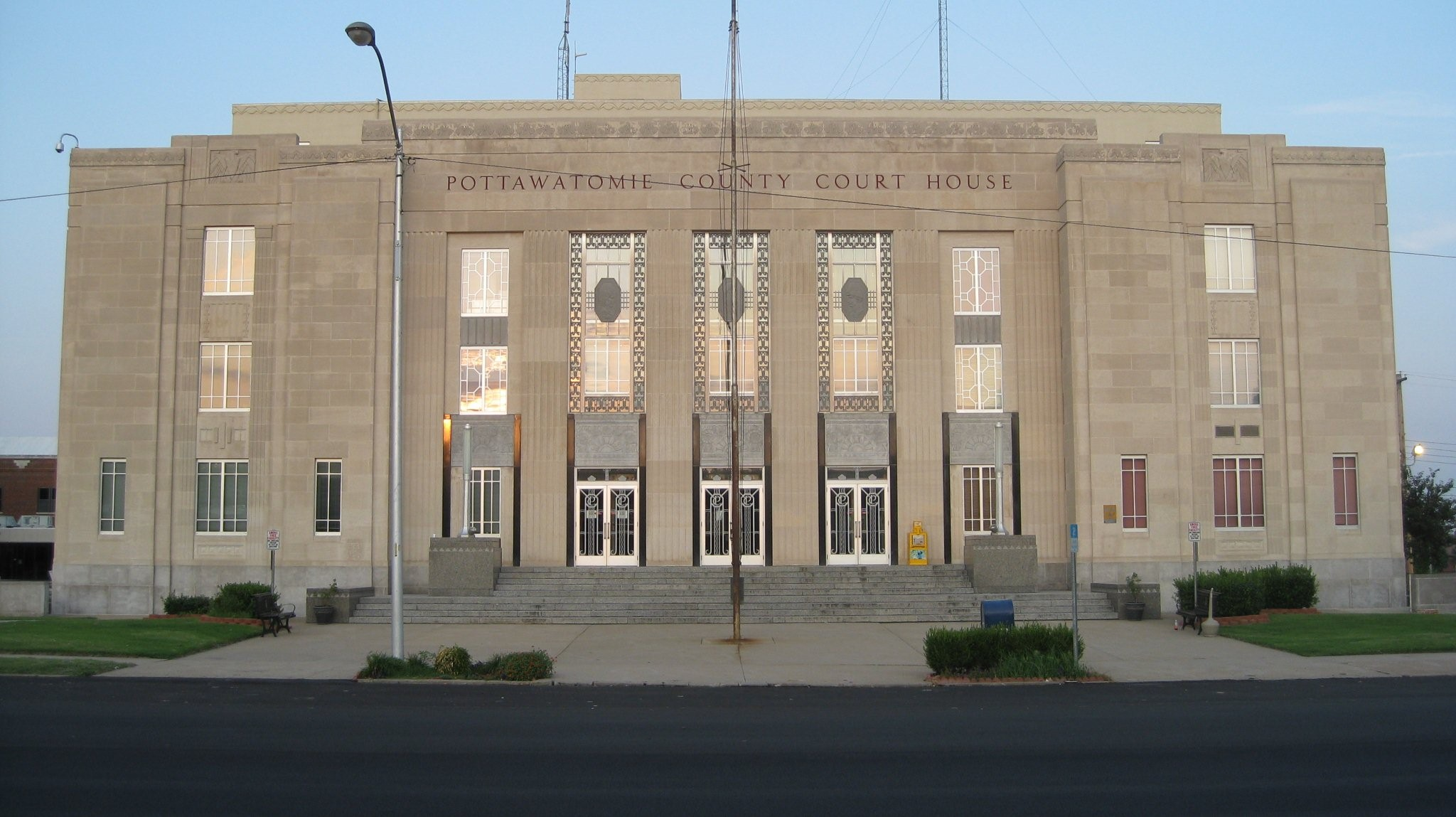
Pottawatomie County Courthouse

In 1907 Oklahoma was admitted as a state and 8,024 people voted that the county seat be moved to Shawnee while 5,027 wanted it to remain in Tecumseh. The case was appealed and the higher courts decided bribery might have figured into the election since Shawnee had offered use of property in Woodland Park as a site for the county court house. In 1911, the people of Pottawatomie County again voted to keep the county seat at Tecumseh, by a vote of 7,749 to 5,927.

In October 1930 some 6,700 signatures were collected on a petition to ask Governor William J. Holloway for a referendum on the site of the county seat. A special election was held December 18, and 12,800 voters, a record number, went to the polls. Shawnee won the necessary two-thirds majority by a 90-vote margin. A recount cut this to 11. Tecumseh filed suit, alleging election fraud relating to a $35,000 slush fund, Shawnee supporters providing liquor at the polls, college boys being allowed to vote, etc. The Supreme Court favored Shawnee.

Until the mid-1930s, county officers contracted business in downtown Shawnee buildings. President Franklin D. Roosevelt's New Deal helped fund construction of a new county courthouse in Shawnee which was built in Woodland Park. On July 6, 1935, Governor E.W. Marland dedicated the new building.

== Geography ==
According to the United States Census Bureau, the city has a total area of 44.7 square miles (116 km^{2}), of which 42.3 square miles (110 km^{2}) is land and 2.4 square miles (6.2 km^{2}) (5.37%) is water.

== Demographics ==
Historical population
Census	Pop.	Note	%±
1900	3,462		—
1910	12,474		260.3%
1920	15,348		23.0%
1930	23,283		51.7%
1940	22,053		−5.3%
1950	22,948		4.1%
1960	24,326		6.0%
1970	25,075		3.1%
1980	26,506		5.7%
1990	26,017		−1.8%
2000	28,692		10.3%
2010	29,857		4.1%
2020	31,377		5.1%

=== 2020 census ===
As of the 2020 census, Shawnee had a population of 31,377. The median age was 35.5 years. 23.1% of residents were under the age of 18 and 16.7% of residents were 65 years of age or older. For every 100 females there were 92.6 males, and for every 100 females age 18 and over there were 89.0 males age 18 and over.

93.7% of residents lived in urban areas, while 6.3% lived in rural areas.

There were 11,980 households in Shawnee, of which 29.5% had children under the age of 18 living in them. Of all households, 39.6% were married-couple households, 19.5% were households with a male householder and no spouse or partner present, and 33.1% were households with a female householder and no spouse or partner present. About 31.0% of all households were made up of individuals and 13.8% had someone living alone who was 65 years of age or older.

There were 13,650 housing units, of which 12.2% were vacant. Among occupied housing units, 54.6% were owner-occupied and 45.4% were renter-occupied. The homeowner vacancy rate was 2.4% and the rental vacancy rate was 11.2%.

Racial composition as of the 2020 census
Race	Percent
White	65.9%
Black or African American	4.6%
American Indian and Alaska Native	13.7%
Asian	1.0%
Native Hawaiian and Other Pacific Islander	0.1%
Some other race	2.8%
Two or more races	11.9%
Hispanic or Latino (of any race)	7.4%

=== 2000 census ===
As of the 2000 census there were 28,692 people, 11,311 households, and 7,306 families residing in the city. The population density was 678.9 inhabitants per square mile (262.1/km^{2}). There were 12,651 housing units at an average density of 299.3 per square mile (115.6/km^{2}). The racial makeup of the city was 77.03% White, 4.06% African American, 12.82% Native American, 0.95% Asian, 0.05% Pacific Islander, 0.72% from other races, and 4.37% from two or more races. Hispanic or Latino of any race were 2.72% of the population.

There were 11,311 households, out of which 29.7% had children under the age of 18 living with them, 46.2% were married couples living together, 14.4% had a female householder with no husband present, and 35.4% were non-families. About 30.4% of all households were made up of individuals, and 13.3% had someone living alone who was 65 years of age or older. The average family size was 2.96.

The median income for a household in the city was $27,659, and the median income for a family was $35,690. Males had a median income of $29,792 versus $20,768 for females. The per capita income for the city was $15,676. About 13.8% of families and 17.8% of the population were below the poverty line, including 24.1% of those under age 18 and 11.2% of those age 65 or over.

== Education ==
=== Colleges and universities ===
- Oklahoma Baptist University (OBU) was founded in 1910. The city was chosen by the founders of OBU in part because two Baptist Conventions—one in Indian Territory and one in Oklahoma Territory—had merged in the period of Oklahoma being admitted as a state to the Union. The city of Shawnee was considered neutral territory, since Shawnee had been neither in Indian Territory nor Oklahoma Territory, but instead was within the boundaries of the Potawatomi Nation.
- The former St. Gregory's University, a Benedictine Catholic institution founded in 1875, was located in Shawnee; however, St. Gregory's University suspended operations at the end of 2017, citing financial difficulties. In December 2018, the sale of its Shawnee campus to Hobby Lobby was approved by the bankruptcy court. The campus was then leased to OBU. In May 2019, OBU renamed the tract as the OBU Green Campus, both in honor of the Green family, owners of Hobby Lobby, and because the color green is one of OBU's official university colors. In December 2019, Hobby Lobby and the Green family donated the campus to OBU.

=== Primary and secondary schools ===
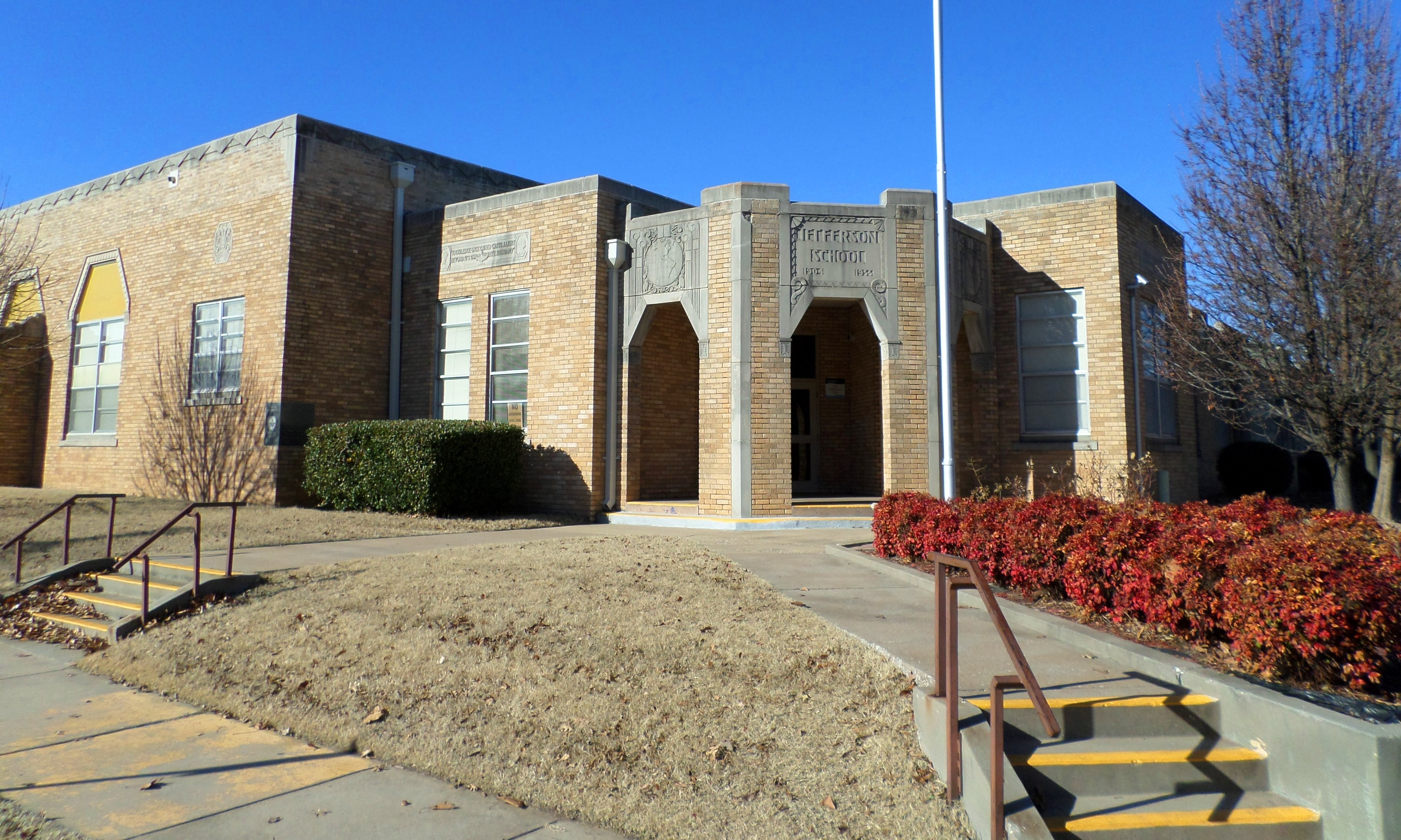
Jefferson Elementary School, Shawnee, Oklahoma

Shawnee is within multiple school districts. Much of Shawnee is in the Shawnee Public Schools school district. Other parts of Shawnee are in these school districts: North Rock Creek Public School, Bethel Public Schools, Dale Public Schools, McLoud Public Schools, South Rock Creek Public School (elementary), Pleasant Grove Public School (elementary), and Grove Public School (elementary).

Shawnee Public Schools Shawnee Public Schools operates preschool through twelfth grades.

- Shawnee High School-1001 N. Kennedy
- Shawnee Middle School-4300 N. Union
- Jim Thorpe Academy-1111 N. Kennedy
- North Rock Creek 42400 Garret's Lake Road
- Horace Mann Elementary-412 N. Draper
- Sequoyah Elementary-1401 E. Independence
- Jefferson Elementary-800 N. Louisa
- Will Rogers Elementary-2600 N. Union
- Shawnee Early Childhood Center-1831 N. Airport

In 2016 the citizens of Shawnee passed a bond issue to build a new elementary school on the north side of town, which continues to grow.

Dependent School Districts Shawnee also has four dependent school districts

- North Rock Creek-42400 Garrett's Lake Road (K-12)
- South Rock Creek-17800 South Rock Creek Road (K-8 only)
- Pleasant Grove-1927 E. Walnut (K-8 only)
- Grove-2800 N. Bryan (K-8 only)

Private Schools

- Liberty Academy, located at 711 E. Federal, operates as a Christian private school and services Pre-Kindergarten to 12th grades. Established in 1978 as a ministry of Liberty Baptist Church, Liberty Academy seeks to provide a biblically-based education with college-oriented content in core courses.

Vocational Training

- Gordon Cooper Technology Center

== Culture ==
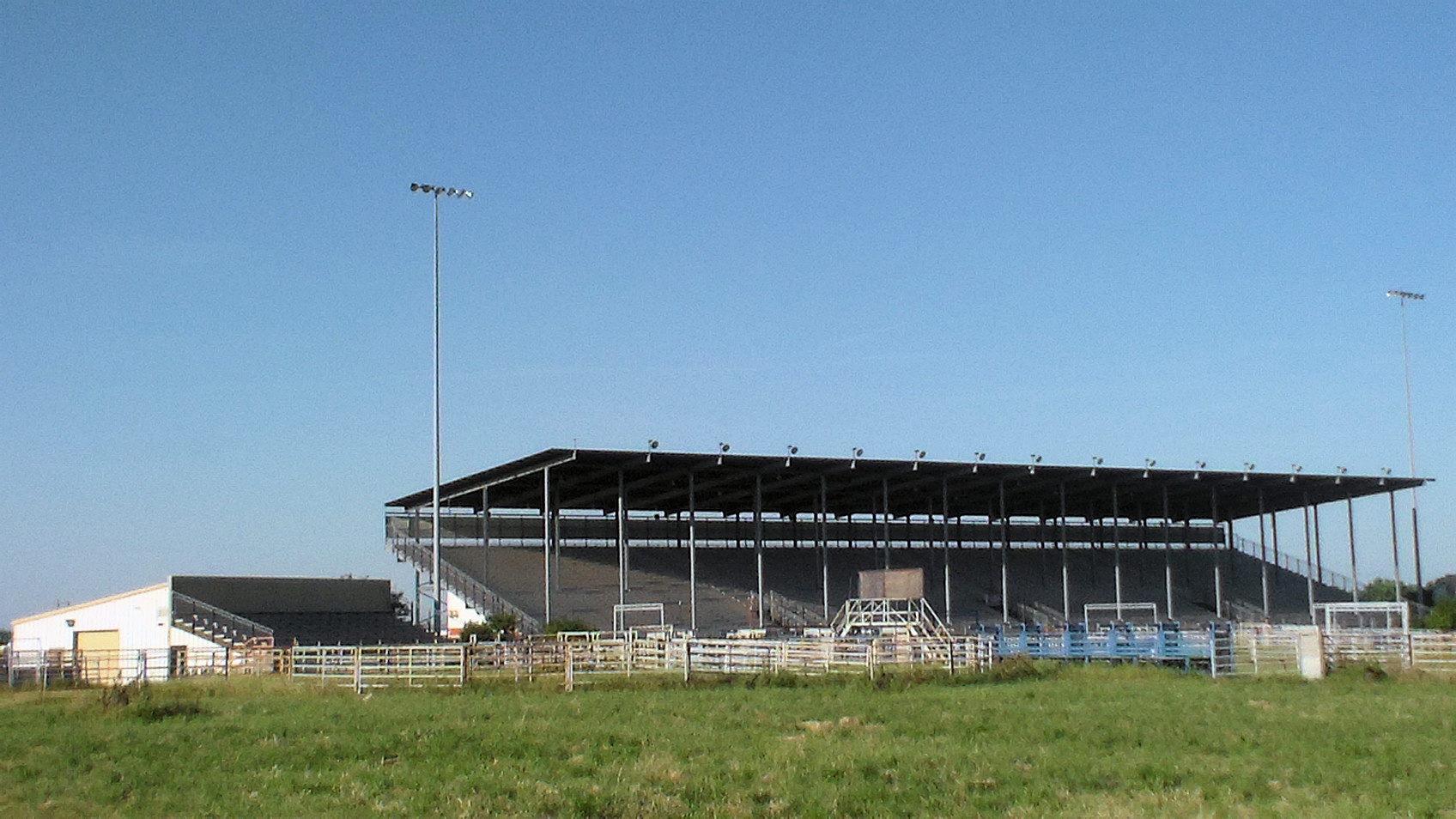
The Heart of Oklahoma Exposition Center's main pavilion

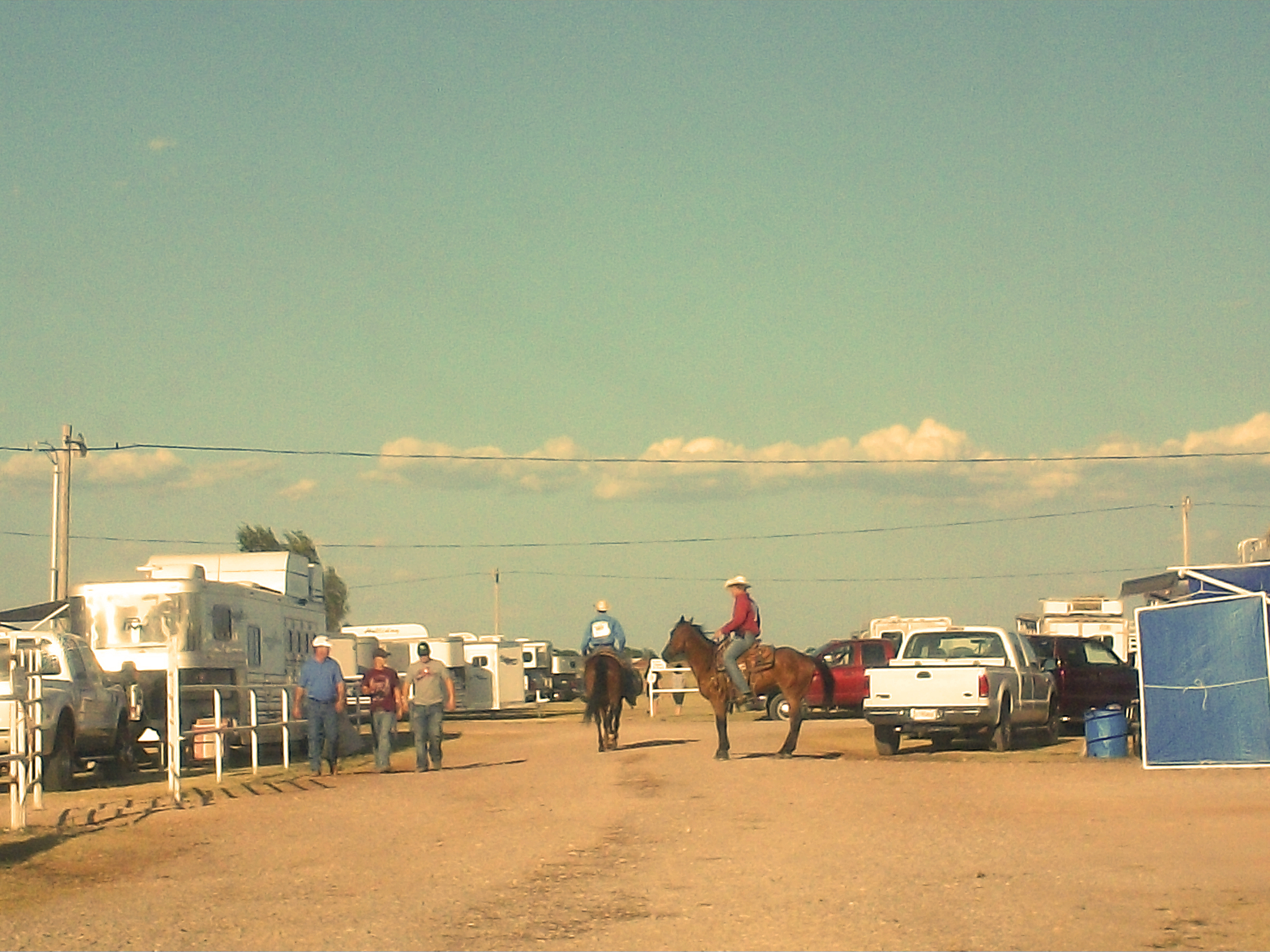
International Finals Youth Rodeo in Shawnee, Oklahoma

The Heart of Oklahoma Exposition Center, opened in 1981, has 152,400 square feet (14,160 m^{2}) of exhibit space, a 19,200-square-foot (1,780 m^{2}) indoor arena that seats 1,000, an outdoor arena seating 7,500, and an RV park, on 72 acres (290,000 m^{2}). Since 1993, the O.E. Center has been the host of the International Finals Youth Rodeo (IFYR), the "richest youth rodeo in the world," with a total prize payout of over $250,000; over 1,100 young riders register for the event each year.

The Citizen Potawatomi Nation, the ninth largest Native American tribe in the United States with 26,000 members, is headquartered between Shawnee and Tecumseh. Their Firelake Casino features over 125,000 square feet (11,600 m^{2}) of gaming space and employs 1,800 people.

=== Airport ===
The Shawnee Regional Airport has a 6,000-foot (1,800 m) asphalt lighted runway with self-services available seven days a week. Shawnee has had an airport, private pilot training and air service since the 1920s. May 7, 1919, the city commission discussed constructing an air field, with several locations offered but settled on the old city farm where the fire horses were kept. Business and civic leaders cooperated with aviation companies in the construction of a modern airport. Graham Flying service operated the facility in the beginning then sold it to Curtiss Flying Service. An Aviation Committee of the Chamber of Commerce brought in several air shows including parachute jumps. In 1930 L.E. Regan purchased the Shawnee Municipal Airport and provided flying lessons, passenger trips and an aviation club. Shawnee was one of the hot spots in the state for aviation and was host to a visit from Amelia Earhart in 1931. The city was part of the Oklahoma Short Line Airways Company with air passenger service in and out daily. With the coming of World War II, civilian fliers were automatically grounded in December 1941 until they took an oath of allegiance, were fingerprinted and presented a birth certificate. City officials went to Washington to offer Shawnee as a site for one of the many military training bases which would be needed as the country headed into the war. Meanwhile, the citizens of Shawnee overwhelmingly passed a bond issue for $200,000 to match the $285,000 allocated by the federal government to build a local base. The Shawnee Municipal Airport was moved to a site north of town. April 1943 the erection of the Shawnee Navy base was begun and by August the first sailors began arriving. First plans for the base was to be an auxiliary extension for the base at Norman but later was named as Shawnee Naval Air Station, a school for navigators. Then abruptly in March 1945 all Navy personnel and equipment were moved to the Clinton OK base because of the limited land available to expand. Shawnee's NAS was put in caretaker status and the equipment was sold off as surplus, much of it going to the City of Shawnee and its citizens. The Shawnee Municipal Airport was returned to its original site in 1946 where it remains today.

==== Terminal ====
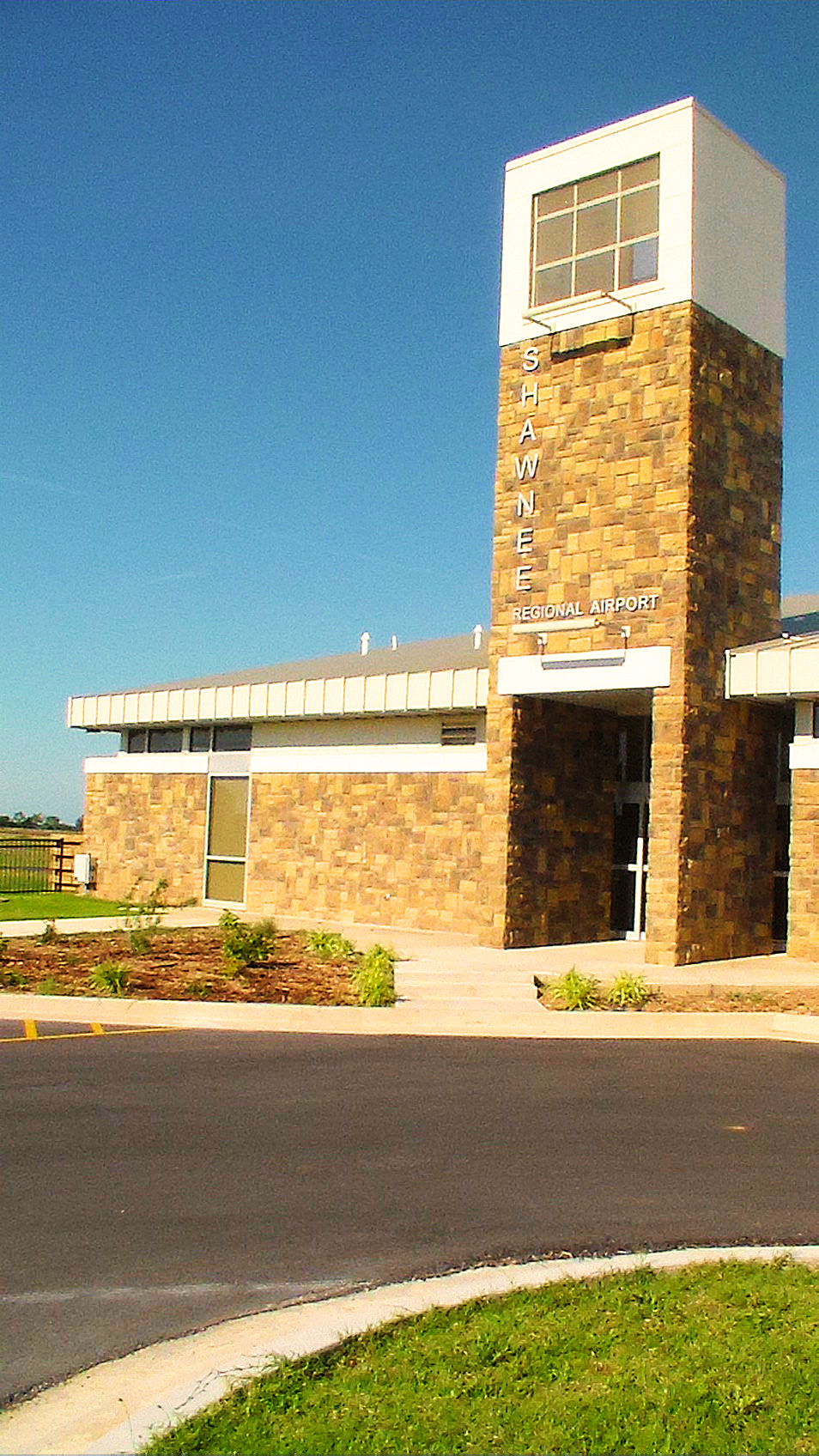
Shawnee Regional Airport Main Terminal

On August 29, 2011, the City of Shawnee opened a new terminal building replacing the terminal built in the 1950s. The modern, two-story design, is approximately 4,000 square feet. Governor of Oklahoma Mary Fallin was the featured speaker during the official opening praising Shawnee officials for their determination in getting the project started, funded and completed led by former Shawnee Mayor Chuck Mills. Oklahoma Aeronautics Commission Director Victor Bird also addressed the crowd saying "It's a far cry from what was here just one year ago."

The new terminal includes offices, lounges, a large conference room space upstairs that doubles as an observation deck. A $325,000 grant from the U.S. Economic Development Authority paid for a large sum of the more than $965,000 it took to build the new terminal building. The Aeronautics Commission also provided a $275,000 state grant to help in the construction costs, while the City of Shawnee paid for the remaining amount. From 2008 to 2011, the Shawnee Regional Airport received nearly $8 million in state and federal grants for various runway and taxiway improvements.

==== Sister City – Nikaho, Japan ====
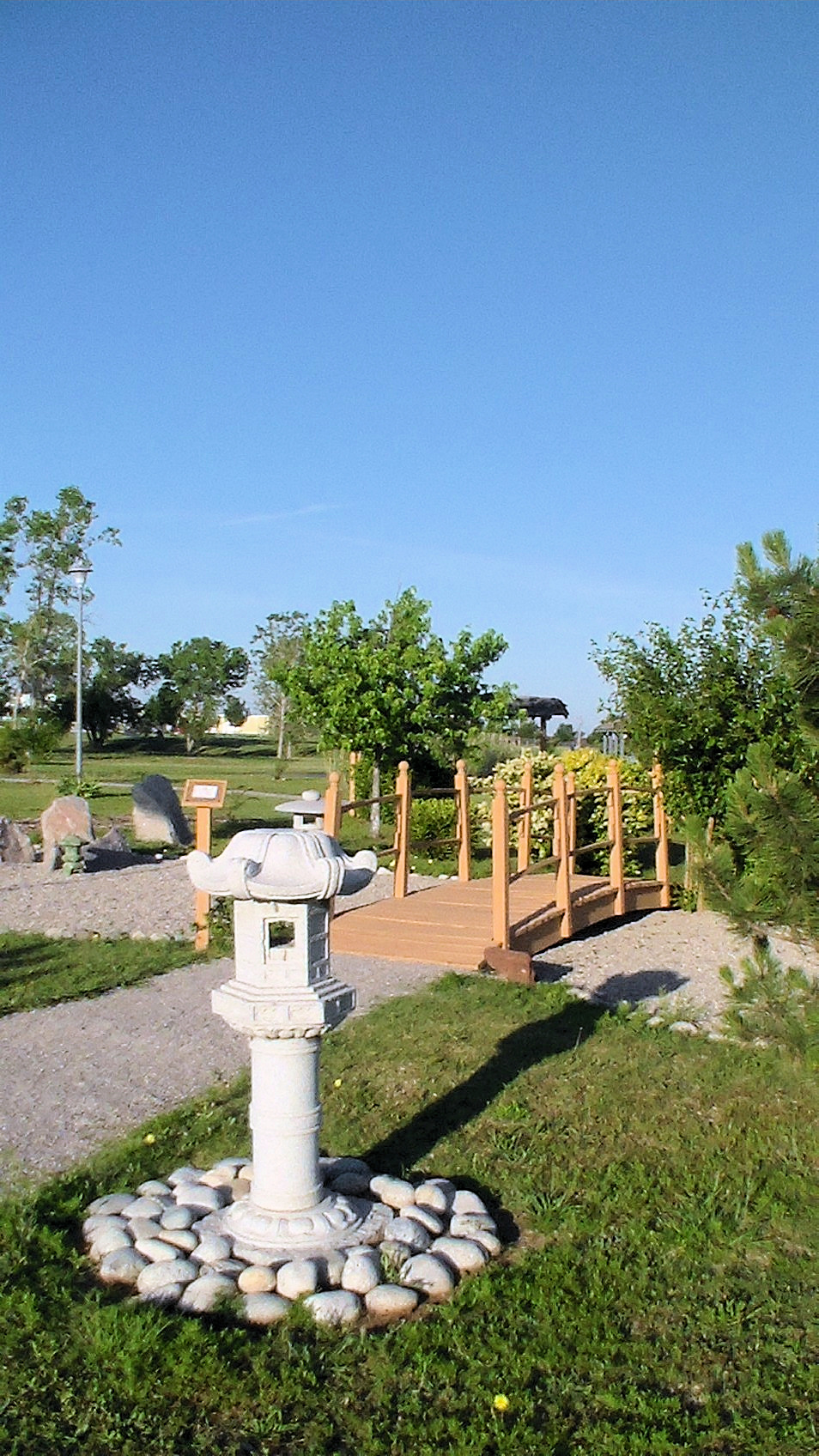
Bridge of Understanding at the Japanese Peace Garden

At the southeastern edge of the airport is a commemorative Japanese International Peace Garden A "Bridge of Understanding" and a gravel area with several Oriental-style stone ornamentation. A plaque at the bridge states: "Shawnee Nikaho/Bridge of Understanding/is dedicated to the memory of Mayor Pierre Taron/a strong proponent of Sister Cities. "There is a gazebo approximately 15 ft. by 18 ft. with a gravel and stone floor. In the center is a wood picnic table with benches for seating on each side. The roof is wood shingled and colorful flowers are planted around the outside of the gazebo which is dedicated to the Sister Cities International program between Shawnee and Nikaho, Japan. In 1987, a Japanese manufacturing company, TDK, opened a factory in Shawnee which locally manufactures ferrite magnets for electronic motors. The mayor of Shawnee at that time, Pierre F. Taron, Jr., sought to establish a Sister City relationship between Shawnee, Oklahoma, U.S.A. and Nikaho, Japan. Each year, citizens of each town visit the other town, to renew ties, exchange gifts, and spend time learning about the other's culture. The delegations stay with local host families.

=== Museums and theatre ===
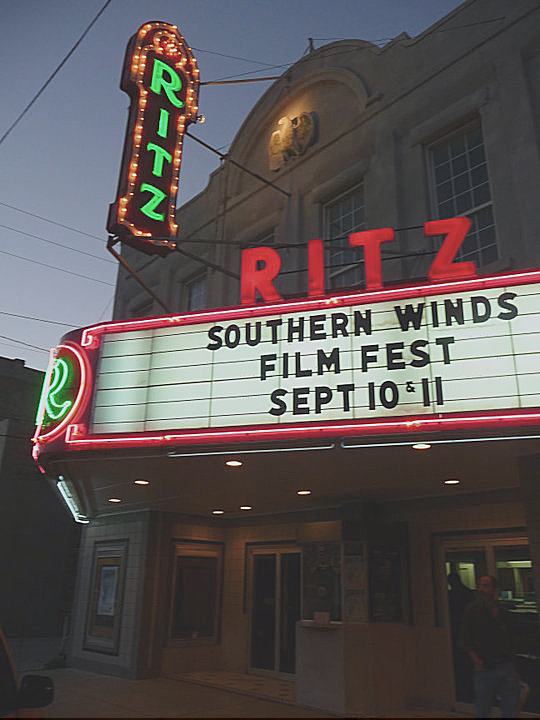
Ritz Theater in downtown Shawnee

The Pottawatomie County Historical Society maintains a museum of the railroad history in the county as well as displaying other artifacts of the area in the former Santa Fe Depot, downtown at 614 E Main.

The Citizen Potawatomi Nation operates a Cultural Heritage Center which houses tribal rolls, archives, and gift shop. The institution also interprets and presents exhibits of Potawatomi culture. Located between Shawnee and Tecumseh.

The Mabee-Gerrer Museum of Art, located on Oklahoma Baptist University's Green Campus (the former campus of St. Gregory's University) is one of the oldest museums in Oklahoma. Its collections include Egyptian, Medieval, Renaissance, Contemporary, and Native American items.

Shawnee Little Theater and OBU have organized seasons of theater programs in Shawnee.

=== Parks and recreation ===
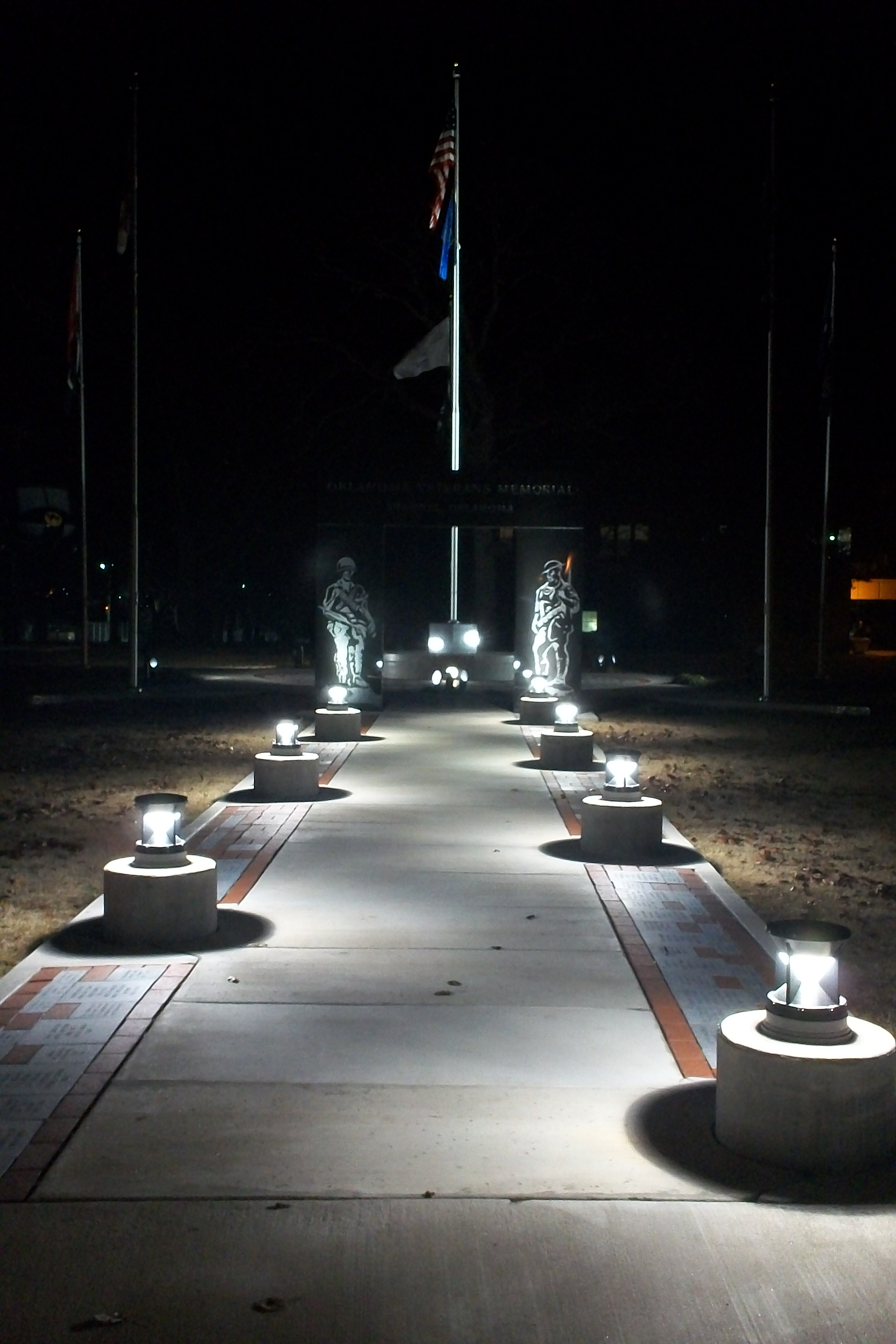
Oklahoma Veteran's Memorial in Woodland Veteran's Park

The City of Shawnee maintains Shawnee Twin Lakes, which are located to the west of the city.

Shawnee has numerous small parks within the city.

Larch–Miller Park is located in the 900 block of North Broadway. The park was dedicated to Aloysius Larch-Miller who fought for women's suffrage and was head of the ratification committee fighting for a special session to ratify the Nineteenth Amendment. Although sick with influenza, and against advice, Larch-Miller debated Oklahoma Attorney General Sargent Prentiss Freeling. She won a majority of support but the strain took its toll and she died on February 2, 1920. A monument was erected in the park to honor her by Carrie Chapman Catt.

Woodland Veteran's Memorial Park is two blocks north of Main street. First built in 1905, the park originally featured fountains and sunken gardens and was the site of frequent Chautauqua meetings led by such people as William Jennings Bryan. In 1905, the Carnegie library was built on the southwest corner of the park (currently the District Attorney's office of Pottawatomie County, Oklahoma). There is also a Veteran's memorial in the southeast corner as well that features a helicopter once used during the Korean War. The park also features the Splash Pad that opened in 2015 replacing the large Municipal swimming pool which had been built by the PWA in 1936. The stone-constructed locker room remains from the pool. The park also features two tennis courts located on the east side of the park and has a playground area and a stage with metal bleachers used for special events throughout the year. There are numerous stone and concrete picnic tables, some over eighty years old. A small sculpture of a bald eagle atop a sphere on the north edge and a miniature version of the Statue of Liberty face Highland street.

Briscoe Boy Scout Park named in honor of Dick Briscoe, a long-time Boy Scout leader in Shawnee, – located at East Main and Pesotum streets. It features a splash pad, two basketball courts, two tennis courts, a playground for children, picnic tables with BBQ grills and a walking track around the park.

Red Bud Park – located at the intersection of Beard and Dill and to the west of Larch-Miller park. This park was constructed after the devastating flood of Shawnee Creek that ran through the area in 1928. The picturesque park features a large drainage ditch lined with local stone, many large trees, playground equipment and a wrought-iron entrance sign.

Shawnee is home to three wellness facilities.

- Troy & Dollie Smith Family YMCA
- Recreation and Wellness Center, on the Campus of Oklahoma Baptist University
- Firelake Fitness Center, operated by the Citizen Potawatomi Nation

=== Sports ===
Shawnee has a rich sports history that reaches back before statehood. The first report of a town baseball team was in 1902. There has since been organized baseball, from sandlot to minor league teams. In the early days of Shawnee, businesses such as the Rock Island shops and civic organizations promoted teams in the Twilight League. In 1929 and '30 Shawnee was home to the Robins, a St. Louis Cardinal minor league team and part of the Western Association. Several Robins went on to play MLB, including Bob Klinger (Pirates), Ival Goodman (Reds, Cubs), Alfred "Lefty" Smith (Giants, Phillies, Indians), Ray Starr (Cardinals, Giants, Braves, Reds, Pirates, Cubs) and Fritz Ostermueller (Red Sox, Browns, Dodgers, Pirates), who was depicted in the Jackie Robinson film "42."

The Brooklyn Dodgers provided Shawnee with a Class D minor league in the Sooner State League from 1950 to 1957. The Hawks competed against McAlester, Ardmore, Pauls Valley, Lawton, Seminole and Sherman and Paris, Texas. The most well-known major leaguers to get their start with the Hawks were Don Demeter, a Dodger pitcher from Oklahoma City and Stan Williams (Dodgers, Yankees, Indians and Twins).

Shawnee also hosted two spring training games between major league teams at Athletic Field (now called Memorial Park). In 1937 the New York Giants and Cleveland Indians played and brought in the Giants leading pitchers, Carl Hubbell, who was from the nearby community of Meeker. The following year the Pittsburgh Pirates and the Chicago White Sox also played a game in Shawnee. Cy Blanton, who lived in Shawnee and had played for the Robins, and Paul and Loyd Waner from nearby McLoud, were members of the Giants' squad.

At least 34 Major League Baseball players have connections to Shawnee, either by birth, or having played on a local team or lived in town at one time. Eighteen with ties to Shawnee have played professional football and ten local athletes have participated in pro basketball.

Shawnee High School has also had a colorful sports history. Records from as early as 1906 are found for football and baseball. Over the years the football team has won the state title three times, the most recent was in 2003. Several SHS grads have gone on to play NFL football over the years, most notedly Darrien Gordon, a 1989 grad, who played in three Super Bowls, one with the San Diego Chargers and two with the Denver Broncos. Notably, since the year 2000, SHS has won seven state championships, two in baseball, one in girls' basketball, two in boys' cross country, one in boys' track and one in girls' track. The high school provides excellent facilities with Jim Thorpe Stadium, Memorial Park, softball field and the Shawnee Performing Arts Center combo which includes a state-of-the art gym.

Shawnee offers youth sports of all variety either through the YMCA or the Shawnee Sports Association. There are also three golf courses, several tennis courts, two bowling alleys, Lion's Club baseball park and a softball complex at Firelake. Shawnee briefly hosted the Shawnee Warriors, a semi-pro football team that competed in the Oklahoma Metro Football League competing as the Millers, affiliated with the Oklahoma City Yard Dawgz, a minor league pro arena team that season.

Shawnee is home to the Potawatomi Fire of The Basketball League (TBL), which plays at FireLake Arena and won league titles in 2023 and 2024.

== Sister city relation ==
- Nikaho, Akita, Japan

== Notable people ==
- Brad Pitt, born in Shawnee, actor, producer
- Brent Ashabranner, Peace Corps administrator and author
- Jack Baer, sports star and graduate of Shawnee High School and OU, Sooners baseball coach winning Nat'l championship in 1951, and long-time on the staff of the football program.
- Dan Boren, United States Representative from Oklahoma's 2nd congressional district
- Harold Cagle, graduate of SHS, track star at OBU, who participated in the 1936 Summer Olympics in Berlin, where his 4x400 relay team placed second
- Joe Frank Cobb, born in Shawnee, actor, original "fat boy" in the early "Our Gang" series
- Martha Lillard, polio survivor, best known for being the last person living in the iron lung
- Patrick Cobbs, born in Shawnee but lived in nearby Tecumseh, Oklahoma, pro football running back and special teams player for Miami Dolphins
- Doug Combs, Vice Chief Justice, Supreme Court of Oklahoma
- Leroy Gordon Cooper, one of the original Mercury Seven astronauts
- Samantha Crain, songwriter, musician
- Melodie Crittenden, singer
- Jeremy Dawson, keyboardist for Shiny Toy Guns
- Mason Dye, actor
- Bryn Edelston, American-Australian socialite, actress
- Ryan Franklin, pro baseball pitcher with Mariners, Phillies, Reds, Cardinals, wife from Shawnee, makes home in Shawnee
- Robert Galbreath, Jr., drilled first oilwell in Glenn Pool Field.
- Gregory Gerrer, monk, artist, founder of Mabee-Gerrer Museum of Art
- Darrien Gordon, pro football player with Chargers, Broncos and Raiders, played in three Super Bowls
- Jonathan Gray, pro baseball pitcher with the Texas Rangers, born in Shawnee
- Prerna Gupta, entrepreneur
- Monte Hale, singer, movie star, comic book character
- Wade Hayes, country singer
- Brad Henry, Governor of Oklahoma 2003–11
- Kim Henry, First Lady of Oklahoma 2003–11 (wife of Brad Henry); teacher at Shawnee High School
- Robert Harlan Henry, President of Oklahoma City University, United States Court of Appeals for the Tenth Circuit judge, and Oklahoma Attorney General
- Brewster Higley, homesteader, medical doctor, poet of the famous folk song "Home on the Range"
- Tim Holt, Hollywood actor, died in Shawnee Medical Center Hospital
- Creed Humphrey, center for the Kansas City Chiefs, Super Bowl LVII champion
- Robert L. Lynn, college president (Louisiana College)
- Vicky McGehee, songwriter
- Charles ("Chuck") W. Mooney Jr., the Charles A. Heimbold, Jr. Professor of Law, and former interim Dean, at the University of Pennsylvania Law School
- Zack Mosley, graduate of Shawnee High School, creator of The Adventures of Smilin' Jack aviation cartoon strip, developer of Civil Air Patrol
- Gregori Chad Petree, singer for Shiny Toy Guns
- Ross Porter, longtime sportscaster for Los Angeles Dodgers
- Burton Rascoe, attended Shawnee High School, author, columnist, critic – biography "Before I Forget", details life growing up in Shawnee
- Robert Reed, attended Woodrow Wilson grade school, actor, Mike Brady on "The Brady Bunch"
- Ann C. Scales, legal scholar
- James R. Scales, academic administrator and President of Oklahoma Baptist University and Wake Forest University
- Ron Sharp, former member of the Oklahoma State Senate from the 17th district
- Troy N. Smith, Sr., restaurateur, developer of Sonic Drive-ins, opened first one in his hometown of Shawnee in 1959
- Kris Steele, Speaker of the Oklahoma House of Representatives
- Frank Thompson, costume designer for Broadway, television, and film
- Jim Thorpe, Olympian, pro football, baseball, basketball player, named Athlete of Century, born eastern edge of Pottawatomie Co., called Shawnee his hometown
- Krista Tippett, journalist, author, host of public radio's On Being
- William O. Wooldridge, first Sergeant Major of the Army
