= Eldridge =

Eldridge may refer to:

== People ==
=== Surname ===
- A. D. Eldridge (1851–?), American politician from Wisconsin
- Aethelred Eldridge (1930–2018), American painter and art professor
- Alexandra Eldridge (born 1948), American contemporary painter
- Allen Eldridge, American board game designer
- Ambrose Eldridge (ca. 1815 – 1860), Australian chemist
- Asa Eldridge (1809–1856), American sea captain
- Ben Eldridge (1938–2024), American banjo player and founder of the bluegrass group The Seldom Scene
- Brody Eldridge (William Brody Eldridge; born 1987), American football player
- Bryce Eldridge (born 2004), American baseball player
- Charles Eldridge (1854–1922), American stage and screen actor
- Charles W. Eldridge (1877–1922), American politician from Massachusetts
- Chris Eldridge, American guitarist and singer
- Clarence Eldridge (1888–1981), American baseball umpire and advertising executive
- Clark Eldridge (1896–1990), American bridge engineer
- Conner Eldridge (born 1977), United States Attorney for the Western District of Arkansas (2010–2015)
- David Eldridge (disambiguation), several people
- Dekabriean Eldridge (born 1992), American basketball player
- Don Eldridge (1919–2007), American politician from Washington
- Elleanor Eldridge (1784/85 - ca. 1845), African American/Native American entrepreneur
- Ernest Eldridge (1897–1935), British world land speed record holder
- Florence Eldridge (1901–1988), American actress
- Frank Eldridge Jr. (1932–2006), American politician from Georgia
- Frederick G. Eldridge (1837–1889), American banker, president of the Knickerbocker Trust Company (1884)
- George H. Eldridge (1844–1918), American soldier
- Hope Tisdale Eldridge (1904–1991), American statistician, demographer
- Jamie Eldridge (born 1973), American politician from Massachusetts
- Jeff Eldridge (born 1967), American politician from West Virginia
- Jim Eldridge (born 1944), British radio, film and television screenwriter
- Jimmy Eldridge (born 1948), American politician from Tennessee
- Jan J. Eldridge, New Zealand theoretical astrophysicist
- Joe Eldridge (disambiguation), several people
- John Eldridge (disambiguation), several people
- Laura Eldridge, American women's health writer and activist
- Lisa Eldridge (born 1966), British make-up artist
- Marian Eldridge (1936–1997), Australian writer
- Marie D. Eldridge (1926–2009), American statistician
- Mildred Eldridge (1909–1991), British artist
- Osiris Eldridge (born 1988), American basketball player
- Paul Eldridge (1888–1982), American writer
- Richard Eldridge (born 1953), American philosopher
- Ronnie Eldridge (née Myers), American activist, businesswoman, politician, and television host from New York
- Roy Eldridge (1911–1989), American jazz musician
- Sean Eldridge (born 1986), American businessman and congressional candidate
- Tom Eldridge (1923–2006), Australian rules footballer
- Tony Eldridge (Anthony William Charles Eldridge; 1923–2015), Royal Navy officer

=== First name ===
- Eldridge Cleaver (1935–1998), African-American activist
- Eldridge Dickey (1945–2000), American football player
- Eldridge Eatman (1880–1960), Canadian sprinter
- Eldridge Emory (1935–2023), American politician
- Eldridge Hawkins (born 1940), American lawyer and politician from New Jersey
- Eldridge Hawkins Jr. (born 1979), American politician
- Eldridge Haynes (1904–1976), American businessman
- Eldridge Holmes (1942–1998), American singer
- Eldridge R. Johnson (1867–1945), American businessman and inventor
- Eldridge Lovelace (1913–2008), American city planner and author
- Eldridge Milton (born 1962), American football player
- Eldridge M. Moores (1938–2018), American geologist
- Eldridge Recasner (born 1967), American basketball player
- Eldridge Rojer (born 1984), Dutch footballer
- Eldridge Small (1949–2015), American football player

== Places ==
- Eldridge, Alabama, a town
- Eldridge, California, a census-designated place
- Eldridge, Iowa, a city
- Eldridge, Missouri, an unincorporated community
- Eldridge, North Dakota, an unincorporated community
- Eldridge Bay, a waterway in Canada
- Eldridge Glacier, Alaska
  - Mount Eldridge
- Eldridge Street, New York City
- Eldridge Township, Laclede County, Missouri
- Lakes on Eldridge, Texas

Buildings

- Eldridge Building, a historic building in Spokane, Washington
- The Eldridge Hotel, a historic hotel in Lawrence, Kansas
- Eldridge House, a historic house in Taunton, Massachusetts
- Eldridge Street Synagogue, New York City
- Eldridge Turn-Halle, a historic building in Eldridge, Iowa

== Other uses ==
- Eldridge v British Columbia (AG), a leading decision by the Supreme Court of Canada
- USS Eldridge (DE-173), a US Navy destroyer escort that served in World War II
- Eldridge Industries, an American investment company
- Eldridge Smerin, an architectural firm based in London
- The Eldridge, a starship in the video game Xenogears

== See also ==
- Eldridgeville, Belize
- Eldredge (disambiguation)
- Eldritch (disambiguation)
- Elbridge (disambiguation)
- Elkridge (disambiguation)
- Aldridge (disambiguation)
- Aldrich (disambiguation)
