= Aldrich (surname) =

Aldrich is an Old English surname. Notable persons with that surname include:

- Abby Aldrich (1874–1948), American philanthropist
- Allison Aldrich (born 1988), American Paralympic volleyball player
- Ann Aldrich (1927–2010), American judge
- Anne Reeve Aldrich (1866–1892), American poet and novelist
- Bailey Aldrich (1907–2002), American judge
- Bess Streeter Aldrich (1881–1954), American author
- Charles H. Aldrich (1850–1929), American Solicitor General
- Charlie Aldrich (1921–2015), American musician
- Chester Hardy Aldrich (1862–1924), American politician from Nebraska
- Chester Holmes Aldrich (1871–1940), American architect
- Clark Aldrich, American author
- Cole Aldrich (born 1988), American basketball player
- Cyrus Aldrich (1808–1871), American politician
- Daniel Aldrich (1918–1990), American educator
- David Aldrich (1907–2002), American artist
- David E. Aldrich (born 1963), American cinematographer
- Doug Aldrich (born 1964), American guitarist
- Edgar Aldrich (1848–1921), American judge
- Erin Aldrich (born 1977), American athlete
- Evelyn Aldrich, American businesswoman
- Fred Aldrich (1904–1979), American actor
- Frederick Aldrich (1907–2002), American marine biologist
- Frederick C. Aldrich (1924–2018), American politician
- Gary Aldrich (born 1945), American FBI agent
- Hazen Aldrich (1797–1873), American religious figure
- Henry Aldrich (1647–1710), English theologian and philosopher
- Henry Carl Aldrich (1941–2005), American mycologist
- Herman D. Aldrich (1801–1880), American businessman
- Howard E. Aldrich (born 1940s), American sociologist
- J. Frank Aldrich (1853–1933), American politician
- James Aldrich (1810–1856), American editor and poet
- James Aldrich (politician) (1850–1910), American judge and politician from South Carolina
- Janet Aldrich, American actress and singer
- Jay Aldrich (born 1961), American baseball player
- Jeremy Aldrich (born 1977), American soccer player
- John Aldrich (political scientist) (born 1947), American political scientist
- John Aldrich (MP) (1520–1582), British politician
- John Merton Aldrich (1866–1934), zoologist and entomologist
- John Warren Aldrich (1906–1995), American ornithologist
- Julia Carter Aldrich (1834–1924), American author
- Kate Aldrich (born 1973), American singer
- Ki Aldrich (1916–1983), American football player
- Larry Aldrich (1906–2001), American fashion designer
- Lloyd Aldrich (1886–1967), American engineer
- Louis Aldrich (1843–1901), American actor
- Loyal Blaine Aldrich (1884–1965), American astronomer
- Lucy Aldrich (1869–1955), American philanthropist
- Mal Aldrich (1900–1986), American football player
- Mariska Aldrich (1881–1965), American singer and actress
- Mark Aldrich (1802–1873), American politician and mayor
- Mary Jane Aldrich (1833–1909), American temperance reformer and lecturer
- Michael Aldrich (1941–2014), English inventor and entrepreneur
- Mildred Aldrich (1853–1928), American journalist and writer
- Nelson W. Aldrich (1841–1915), American politician from Rhode Island
- Nelson W. Aldrich Jr. (1935–2022), American editor and author
- Pelham Aldrich (1844–1930), English navy officer and explorer
- Pieter Aldrich (born 1965), South African tennis player
- Putnam Aldrich (1904–1975), American musician and professor
- Richard Aldrich (music critic) (1863–1937), American music critic
- Richard Aldrich (artist) (born 1975), American painter
- Richard S. Aldrich (1884–1941), American lawyer and politician
- Richard W. Aldrich, American neuroscientist
- Robert Aldrich (1918–1983), American film director
- Robert Aldrich (bishop), Anglican bishop
- Robert Aldrich (historian) (born 1954), Australian historian and writer
- Ronnie Aldrich (1916–1993), British musician
- Sarah Aldrich (born 1970), American actress
- Susannah Valentine Aldrich (1828–1915), American author and hymnwriter
- Thomas A. Aldrich (1923–2019), American major general
- Thomas Bailey Aldrich (1836–1907), American writer
- Truman H. Aldrich (1848–1932), American engineer and paleontologist
- Virgil Aldrich (1903–1998), Indian–American philosopher
- William Aldrich (1820–1885), American politician
- William F. Aldrich (1853–1925), American politician
- Winthrop W. Aldrich (1885–1974), American financier

== See also ==
- Aldrich (disambiguation)
