= Eldritch =

Eldritch, an English word used to describe something otherworldly or uncanny, may refer to:

- Eldritch (band), an Italian progressive metal band
- Eldritch (video game), 2013
- Andrew Eldritch (born 1959), English singer, songwriter, and musician
- Eldritch Palmer, a fictional character in the novel The Strain
- Palmer Eldritch, a fictional character in the novel The Three Stigmata of Palmer Eldritch
- Eldritch horror, horror popularized by writer H.P. Lovecraft

== See also ==
- Aldrich (disambiguation)
- Eldridge (disambiguation)
