= Judge Aldrich =

Judge Aldrich may refer to:

- Alfred P. Aldrich (1814–1897), South Carolina circuit court judge
- Ann Aldrich (1927–2010), judge of the United States District Court for the Northern District of Ohio
- Bailey Aldrich (1907–2002), judge of the United States Court of Appeals for the First Circuit
- Edgar Aldrich (1848–1921), judge of the United States District Court for the District of New Hampshire
- James Aldrich (politician) (1850–1910), South Carolina circuit court judge
- Peleg Emory Aldrich (1813–1895), judge of the Massachusetts Superior Court

== See also ==
- Chester Hardy Aldrich (1863–1924), justice of the Nebraska Supreme Court
