= Lorenzo Carter =

Lorenzo Carter may refer to:

- Lorenzo Carter (American football)
- Lorenzo Carter (settler)
