= Aldrick =

Aldrick is a given name. Notable people with the given name include:

- Aldrick Robinson (born 1988), American football player
- Aldrick Rosas (born 1994), American football player

== See also ==
- Aldrich
- Aldrich (surname)
