= Aldridge (disambiguation) =

Aldridge may refer to:

== Places ==
In the United Kingdom

- Aldridge, a town in England
  - Aldridge-Brownhills Urban District
  - Aldridge-Brownhills (UK Parliament constituency), its representation in the House of Commons

In the United States

- Aldridge, Alabama
- Aldridge, Montana, a ghost town in Park County, Montana
- Aldridge, Texas, a ghost town in Jasper County, Texas
- Aldridge Botanical Gardens in Hoover, Alabama

== People ==
- Aldridge (surname)
- Aldridge Bousfield (1941–2020), American mathematician and writer
- The Aldridge Sisters, American singing act
- Simon Aldridge (Inorganic Chemist)

== Other uses ==
- Aldridge Pryor, a fictional character from the British comic magazine Viz
- Aldridge Foundation, an educational charity which sponsors schools in England

== See also ==
- Aldridge Hotel (disambiguation), the name of three Hotels in Oklahoma
