= Aldridge Hotel =

Aldridge Hotel or Hotel Aldridge may refer to:

- Aldridge Hotel (McAlester, Oklahoma), listed on the National Register of Historic Places (NRHP) in Pittsburg County, Oklahoma
- Aldridge Hotel (Shawnee, Oklahoma), listed on the NRHP in Pottawatomie County, Oklahoma
- Hotel Aldridge (Wewoka, Oklahoma), listed on the NRHP in Seminole County, Oklahoma
