= National Register of Historic Places listings in Pottawatomie County, Oklahoma =

Location of Pottawatomie County in Oklahoma

This is a list of the National Register of Historic Places listings in Pottawatomie County, Oklahoma.

This is intended to be a complete list of the properties and districts on the National Register of Historic Places in Pottawatomie County, Oklahoma, United States. The locations of National Register properties and districts for which the latitude and longitude coordinates are included below, may be seen in a map.

There are 20 properties and districts listed on the National Register in the county.

This National Park Service list is complete through NPS recent listings posted February 20, 2026.

== Current listings ==
	Name on the Register	Image	Date listed	Location	City or town	Description
1	Aldridge Hotel	Aldridge Hotel	June 2, 2000 (#00000622)	20–24 E. 9th St. 35°19′44″N 96°55′19″W	Shawnee	
2	Barnard Elementary School	Barnard Elementary School	June 2, 2000 (#00000624)	315 E. Locust St. 35°15′15″N 96°56′01″W	Tecumseh	
3	Beard Cabin	Beard Cabin	April 8, 1983 (#83002121)	614 E. Main St. 35°19′43″N 96°54′59″W	Shawnee	
4	Bell Street Historic District	Bell Street Historic District	December 28, 2000 (#00001579)	Along N. Bell St. from E. 9th St. to E. Main St. 35°19′40″N 96°55′18″W	Shawnee	
5	Billington Building	Billington Building	September 26, 1985 (#85002512)	23 E. 9th 35°19′43″N 96°56′00″W	Shawnee	
6	Chisholm Springs Springhouse		December 12, 2024 (#100011143)	Address Restricted	Asher vicinity	
7	H. T. Douglas Mansion and Garage	H. T. Douglas Mansion and Garage	September 26, 1985 (#85002517)	100 E. Federal St. 35°21′16″N 96°55′17″W	Shawnee	
8	Governors Mansion	Governors Mansion	January 21, 1983 (#83002122)	618 N. Park St. 35°20′09″N 96°55′36″W	Shawnee	
9	Kerfoot House	Kerfoot House	January 21, 1983 (#83002123)	740 N. Beard St. 35°20′19″N 96°55′27″W	Shawnee	
10	Nuckolls House	Nuckolls House	January 21, 1983 (#83002124)	200 E. Federal St. 35°21′17″N 96°55′13″W	Shawnee	
11	Old Santa Fe Railroad Bridge	Old Santa Fe Railroad Bridge	March 10, 2010 (#10000070)	Drummond Rd. 34°55′09″N 97°03′01″W	Wanette	Also known as the Wanette-Byers Bridge
12	Pottawatomie County Courthouse	Pottawatomie County Courthouse	August 24, 1984 (#84003424)	300 N. Broadway Ave. 35°19′51″N 96°55′21″W	Shawnee	
13	Rose-Fast Site (34PT28)	Rose-Fast Site (34PT28)	December 24, 1986 (#86003479)	Address Restricted	Harjo	
14	Sacred Heart Mission Site	Sacred Heart Mission Site	September 15, 1983 (#83002125)	Off State Highway 39; 35°00′04″N 96°48′33″W	Asher	
15	St. Gregory's Abbey and College	St. Gregory's Abbey and College	August 15, 1975 (#75001572)	1900 W. MacArthur Dr. 35°22′03″N 96°57′14″W	Shawnee	
16	Santa Fe Depot	Santa Fe Depot	June 5, 1974 (#74001667)	614 E. Main St. 35°19′41″N 96°54′57″W	Shawnee	
17	Shawnee Friends Mission	Shawnee Friends Mission	March 7, 1973 (#73001569)	2 miles south of Shawnee; 35°17′37″N 96°55′28″W	Shawnee	
18	Squirrel Creek Bridge	Squirrel Creek Bridge	September 3, 2010 (#10000625)	Carries Rangeline Rd. over Squirrel Creek; 35°18′01″N 96°55′48″W	Shawnee vicinity	
19	State National Bank Building	State National Bank Building	March 13, 2020 (#100005083)	2 E. Main St. 35°19′39″N 96°55′24″W	Shawnee	
20	Walker House	Walker House	April 8, 1983 (#83002126)	1801 N. Broadway Ave. 35°21′03″N 96°55′22″W	Shawnee	

== See also ==
- List of National Historic Landmarks in Oklahoma
- National Register of Historic Places listings in Oklahoma
