= Amina Gautier =

American writer and academic

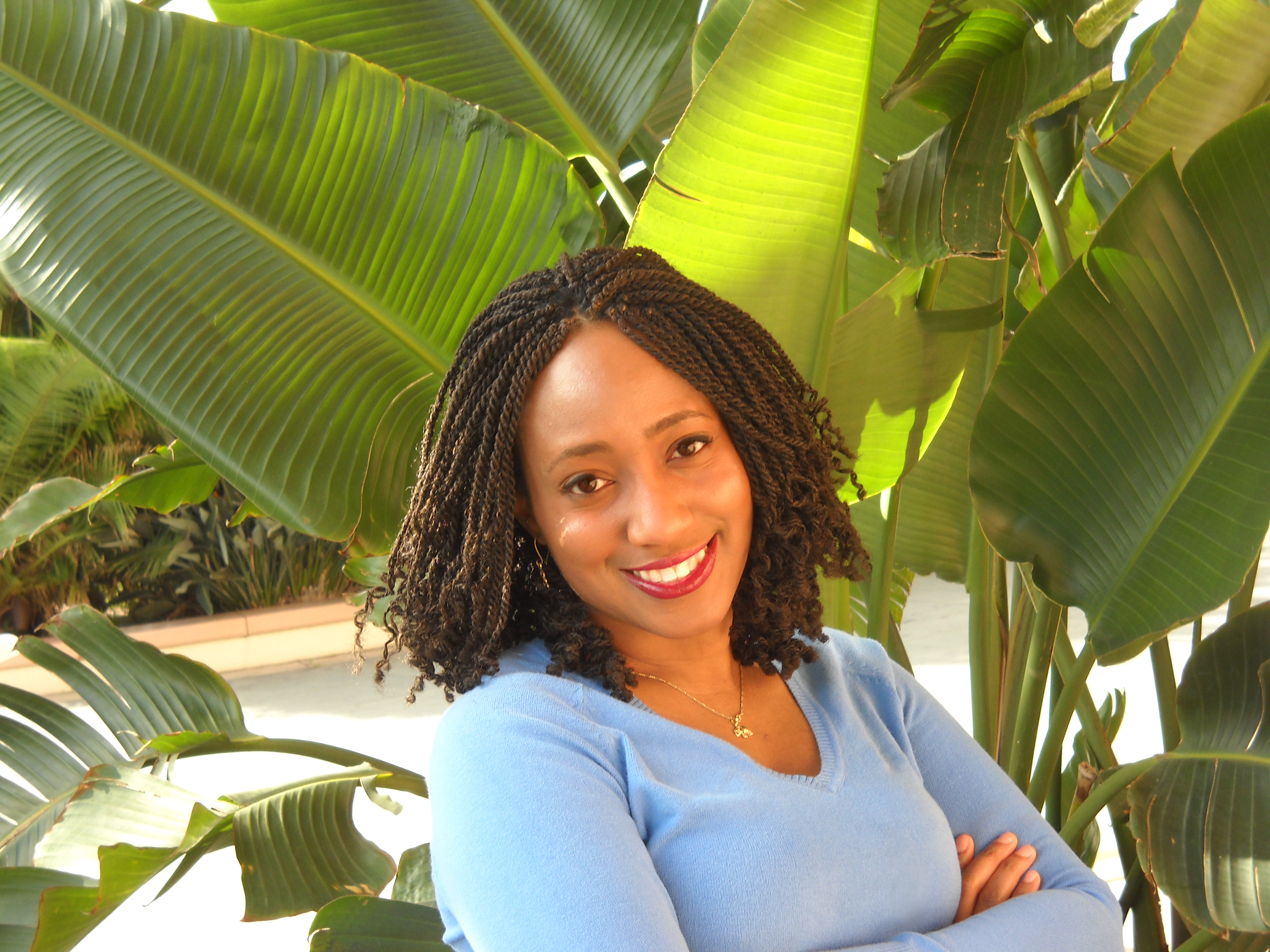
- Gautier in 2011

Amina Gautier is an American writer and academic. She is the author of four short story collections, many individual stories, as well as works of literary criticism.

== Early life and education ==
Gautier was born and raised in New York. After participating in Prep for Prep, she attended the Nightingale Bamford School before graduating from Northfield Mount Hermon. She then attended Stanford, where she earned bachelor's and master's degrees in English literature. She continued her education at the University of Pennsylvania, where she earned a master's degree and a Ph.D. in English literature.

She held a Mellon Minority Undergraduate Fellowship at Stanford University, a Fontaine Fellowship at University of Pennsylvania School of Arts and Sciences, a Mitchem Dissertation Fellowship at Marquette University, and a Postdoctoral Fellowship in the Arts and Sciences at Washington University in St. Louis.

== Career ==
Gautier is a scholar of 19th century American literature. She has written criticism of the 19th-century American authors Charles W. Chesnutt, Paul Laurence Dunbar, Elleanor Eldridge, Benjamin Franklin, Nathaniel Hawthorne, Harriet Beecher Stowe, and Walt Whitman. Her critical essays and reviews have appeared in African American Review, Belles Lettres, Daedalus, Journal of American History, Libraries and Culture, Nineteenth Century Contexts and Whitman Noir. She has received fellowships from the Northeast Modern Language Association (NeMLA), the Social Science Research Council and the Woodrow Wilson Foundation.

=== Writing ===
Gautier has published more than 85 short stories. Her fiction has appeared in a wide variety of magazines and story collections, and some of her stories have been reprinted in anthologies.

=== Teaching ===
Gautier has taught at the University of Pennsylvania, Marquette University, Saint Joseph's University, Washington University in St. Louis, and DePaul University. In fall 2014, she joined the faculty in the MFA program at the University of Miami.

== Honors ==
Gautier has been the recipient of the Crazyhorse Prize, the Danahy Fiction Prize, the Jack Dyer Prize, the William Richey Prize, the Schlafly Microfiction Award and the Lamar York Prize in Fiction.

- 2011: Flannery O'Connor Award for Short Fiction
- 2013: Prairie Schooner Book Prize for Now We Will Be Happy
- 2018: PEN/Malamud Award

== Works ==
- At-Risk. University of Georgia Press, 2011.
- Now We Will Be Happy. University of Nebraska Press, 2014.
- The Loss of All Lost Things. Elixir Press, 2016.
- The Best That You Can Do. Soft Skull Press, 2024.
