= Wanette, Oklahoma =

- Town
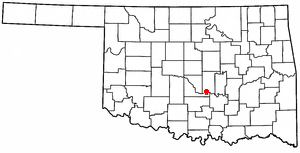
- Location of Wanette, Oklahoma
- Coordinates: 34°57′45″N 97°01′54″W
- Country: United States
- State: Oklahoma
- County: Pottawatomie

Area
  - Total: 0.41 sq mi (1.05 km^{2})
  - Land: 0.41 sq mi (1.05 km^{2})
  - Water: 0 sq mi (0.00 km^{2})
- Elevation: 1,020 ft (310 m)

Population (2020)
  - Total: 279
  - Density: 687.0/sq mi (265.27/km^{2})
- Time zone: UTC-6 (Central (CST))
  - Summer (DST): UTC-5 (CDT)
- ZIP code: 74878
- Area codes: 405/572
- FIPS code: 40-78200
- GNIS feature ID: 2413446

Wanette is a town in Pottawatomie County, Oklahoma, United States. The population was 279 at the time of the 2020 Census. Wanette is part of the Purcell-Lexington retail trade area and is within the Greater Oklahoma City Metropolitan Area.

== History ==
The first settlement took place in 1868, when two settlers from Kansas built a two-story cabin. Other settlers followed. The community had several different names before a post office named Wanette opened on March 19, 1894. In 1903, the town moved one mile north to be on the Atchison, Topeka and Santa Fe Railway line between Newkirk and Pauls Valley

By 1907, Wanette had a population of 739. The population peaked at 783 in 1920. The local economy was based on agriculture. Discovery of the Wanette-Asher oil field aided the economy during the 1930s, but did not prevent a population decline. The town still has an agricultural base, but by the beginning of the 21st Century had become a bedroom community for people working in Moore, Norman and Oklahoma City.

== Geography ==
According to the United States Census Bureau, the town has a total area of 0.4 square miles (1.0 km^{2}), all land.

== Demographics ==
Historical population
Census	Pop.	Note	%±
1910	677		—
1920	783		15.7%
1930	758		−3.2%
1940	665		−12.3%
1950	594		−10.7%
1960	381		−35.9%
1970	303		−20.5%
1980	473		56.1%
1990	346		−26.8%
2000	402		16.2%
2010	350		−12.9%
2020	279		−20.3%
U.S. Decennial Census

=== 2020 census ===
As of the 2020 census, Wanette had a population of 279. The median age was 36.7 years. 28.0% of residents were under the age of 18 and 17.9% of residents were 65 years of age or older. For every 100 females there were 106.7 males, and for every 100 females age 18 and over there were 113.8 males age 18 and over.

0.0% of residents lived in urban areas, while 100.0% lived in rural areas.

There were 120 households in Wanette, of which 39.2% had children under the age of 18 living in them. Of all households, 41.7% were married-couple households, 25.0% were households with a male householder and no spouse or partner present, and 30.0% were households with a female householder and no spouse or partner present. About 26.7% of all households were made up of individuals and 13.3% had someone living alone who was 65 years of age or older.

There were 145 housing units, of which 17.2% were vacant. The homeowner vacancy rate was 0.0% and the rental vacancy rate was 12.5%.

Racial composition as of the 2020 census
Race	Number	Percent
White	196	70.3%
Black or African American	1	0.4%
American Indian and Alaska Native	56	20.1%
Asian	0	0.0%
Native Hawaiian and Other Pacific Islander	0	0.0%
Some other race	2	0.7%
Two or more races	24	8.6%
Hispanic or Latino (of any race)	13	4.7%

=== 2000 census ===
As of the census of 2000, there were 402 people, 147 households, and 108 families residing in the town. The population density was 978.8 inhabitants per square mile (377.9/km^{2}). There were 168 housing units at an average density of 409.0 per square mile (157.9/km^{2}). The racial makeup of the town was 88.31% White, 8.71% Native American, and 2.99% from two or more races. Hispanic or Latino of any race were 0.50% of the population.

There were 147 households, out of which 39.5% had children under the age of 18 living with them, 51.0% were married couples living together, 17.7% had a female householder with no husband present, and 25.9% were non-families. 24.5% of all households were made up of individuals, and 15.0% had someone living alone who was 65 years of age or older. The average household size was 2.73 and the average family size was 3.18.

In the town, the population was spread out, with 30.3% under the age of 18, 13.7% from 18 to 24, 23.1% from 25 to 44, 19.7% from 45 to 64, and 13.2% who were 65 years of age or older. The median age was 29 years. For every 100 females, there were 100.0 males. For every 100 females age 18 and over, there were 89.2 males.

The median income for a household in the town was $21,818, and the median income for a family was $23,000. Males had a median income of $21,731 versus $14,583 for females. The per capita income for the town was $10,740. About 20.2% of families and 21.0% of the population were below the poverty line, including 14.4% of those under age 18 and 30.6% of those age 65 or over.

== Economy ==
The Wanette area economy has long been supported by agriculture. The main crops are cotton, pecans, oats, corn, alfalfa, and hay. Discovery of oil in the nearby Wanette-Asher field caused a brief boom during the early 1930s, which declined before 1940.

== Arts and culture ==
The Wanette–Byars Bridge is listed on the National Register of Historic Places.

== Education ==
It is in the Wanette Public Schools school district.

Wanette High School is located here.
