= Elk Ridge =

Elk Ridge may refer to:

- Elk Ridge (Maryland), a mountain ridge of the Blue Ridge Mountains in Maryland
- Elk Ridge, Saskatchewan, a resort village in Canada
- Elk Ridge, Utah, a city in Utah County, Utah, United States

== See also ==
- Elkridge (disambiguation)
