= Hotel Aldridge (Wewoka, Oklahoma) =

- U.S. National Register of Historic Places
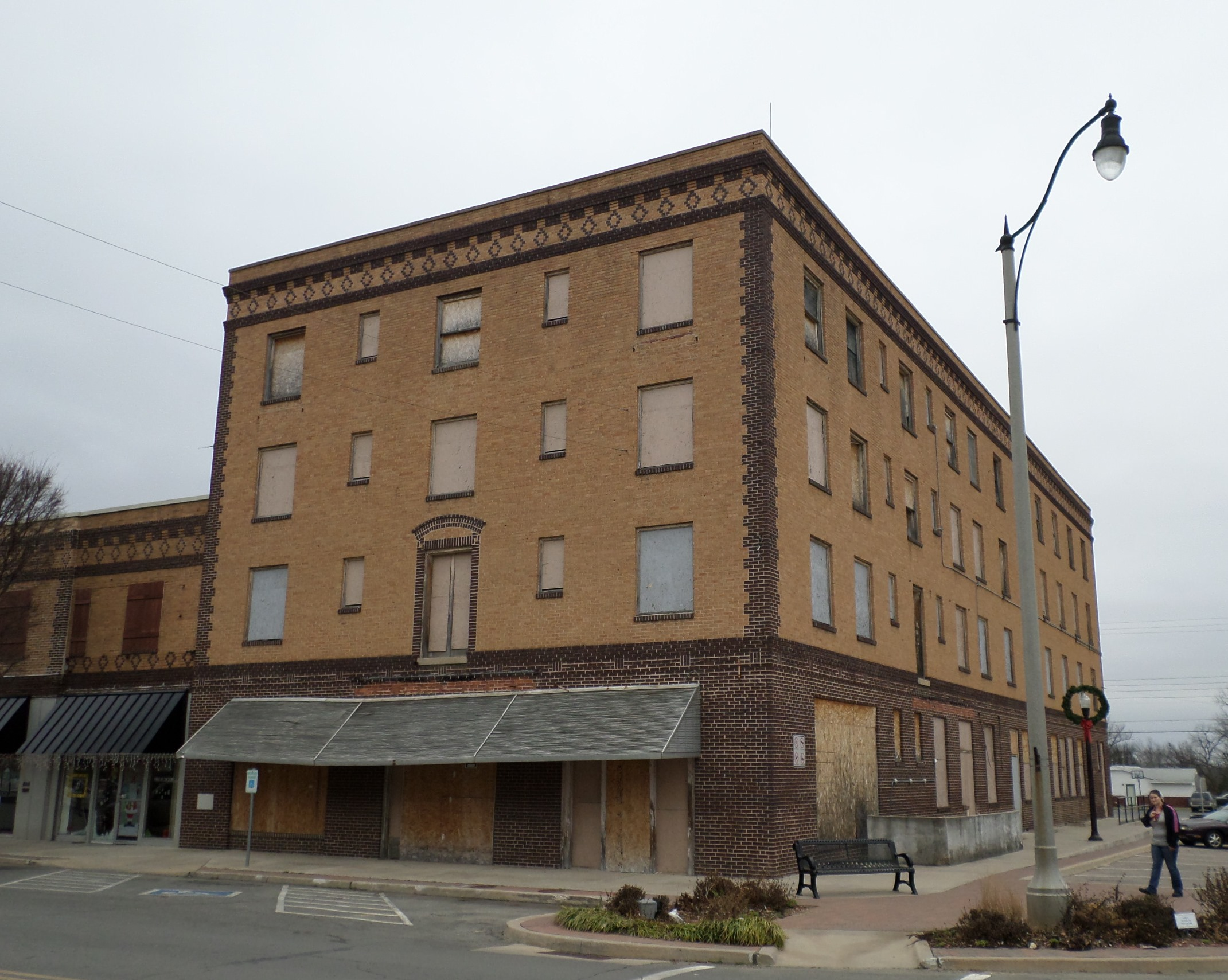
- The hotel building in December 2014

- Location within Oklahoma Location within the United States
- Location: Third and S. Wewoka Streets, Wewoka, Oklahoma
- Coordinates: 35°9′24″N 96°29′27″W
- Area: less than one acre
- Built: 1927
- Architectural style: Plains Commercial
- NRHP reference No.: 86001083
- Added to NRHP: May 14, 1986

The Hotel Aldridge in Wewoka, Oklahoma is a brick building that was built in 1927, four years after the Wewoka Pool of the Seminole Oil Field was opened. It was listed on the National Register of Historic Places in 1986.

It is 50 feet (15 m) by 140 feet (43 m), is four stories tall, and has a flat roof with a 2 feet (0.61 m) parapet all around.

It was deemed significant as the oldest oil boom era hotel in Wewoka and as the best surviving example of Plains Commercial architecture in Wewoka.

== See also ==
- Aldridge Hotel (disambiguation)
