= Joc-O-Sot =

Native American warrior

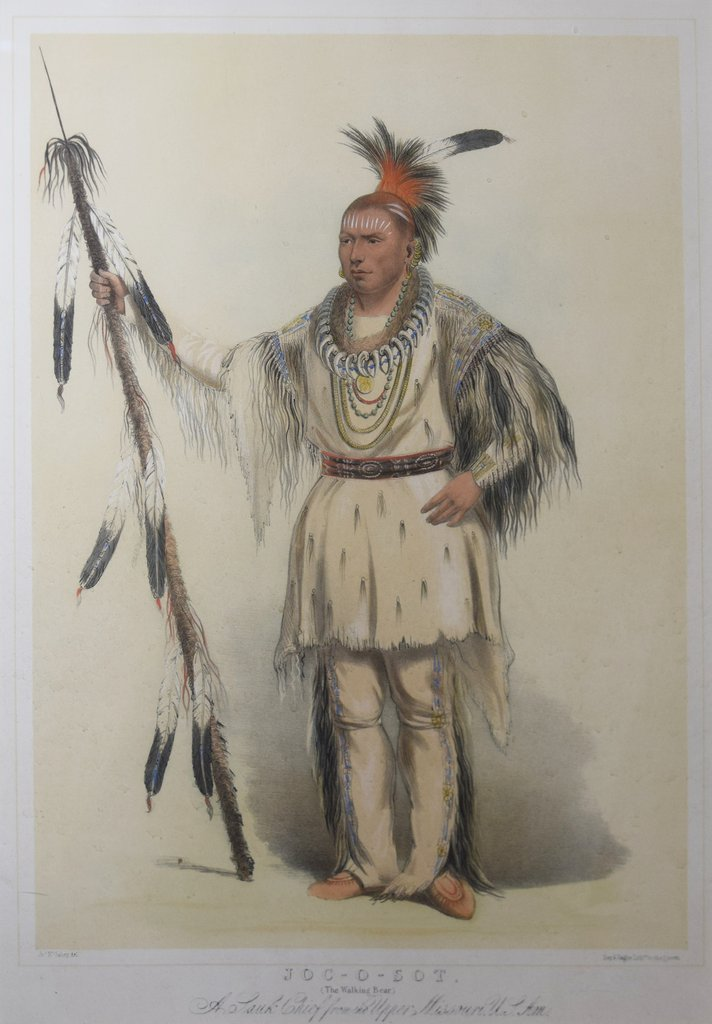
Joc-O-Sot, The Walking Bear, 1844 hand-colored lithograph by George Catlin

Joc-O-Sot, also known as Walking Bear (c. 1810 – September 3, 1844) was a Native American of the Meskwaki tribe. He fought in the Black Hawk war, in which he was wounded. He led some gaming expeditions in the Cleveland area after the war, then joined a theatrical company in which his depiction of Native American life made him very popular throughout the Eastern United States and then Europe. Feeling the effects of old war wounds, he was on his way home via a goodwill tour when he fell seriously ill and died in Cleveland. His gravesite has attracted attention since his death, both because of his story and as a result of local superstition.

== Biography ==
=== Life ===
Joc-O-Sot was born circa 1810 of the Meskwaki tribe, whose home was based around present-day Iowa. His father's name was Katuchasha, who secured the honorific name "The Bear" through his exploits in war against the Osage Nation.

The Meskwaki allied themselves with the Sauk people in the Black Hawk War, and although he personally made effort to prevent that war Joc-O-Sot fought in the conflict as a Meskwaki leader, and as a result suffered notable wounds. Within a couple of years after the war he relocated to the Cleveland, Ohio area and directed expeditions of fishing and hunting. While in Cleveland he began a close association with Dr. Horace Ackley.

Through Ackley he was introduced to Dan Marble, and with the purpose of providing financial support to his tribe joined Marble's theatrical troupe, in which he portrayed scenes of Native American culture. His first theatrical appearance occurred in Cincinnati and proved highly popular, and the act continued across the Eastern United States. Encouraged by Marble, Joc-O-Sot joined in 1844 a company headed by William Vincent Wallace which was to tour England. His appearances there proved highly popular, owing to his costuming, which resulted in a summons for a Royal performance. He was noted for his intelligence, regal bearing, and courtesy. Joc-O-Sot's official lithograph portrait (now lost) by Day and Hague was commissioned by Queen Victoria who had been highly impressed. Joc-O-Sot was not in England very long before he became ill from what was likely tuberculosis and left for the United States of his own accord, his planned destination being home near Fort Leavenworth, Missouri. Evidently he stopped at Washington, D.C., on a diplomatic mission on behalf of his people to President John Tyler, and then headed to Montreal, Canada for the same purpose, making several goodwill stops along the way. He walked as far as Buffalo, New York, at which point his failing health prevented him from walking further. He was persuaded to take a boat further west, but his illness compelled him to stop in Cleveland. He evidently was poorly recompensed by the theater company, as by the time of his arrival in Cleveland he had no financial resources. In Cleveland he was diagnosed with "quick consumption" by a physician and given a place to stay by local coal magnate John G. Stockley in his office. Joc-O-Sot in all likelihood realized he was dying; among his last words were "Joc-O-Sot go up."

=== Death and burial ===
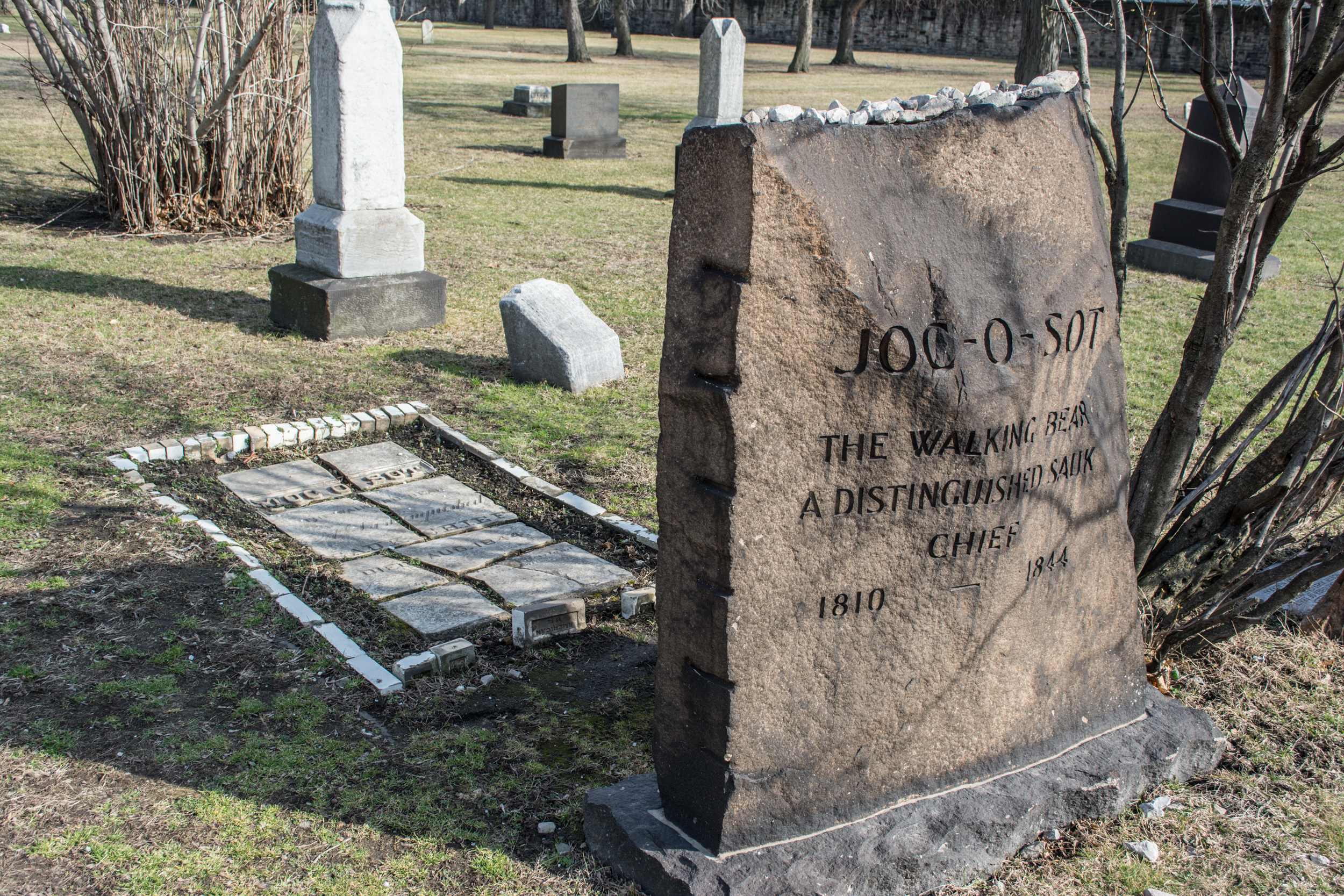
Joc-O-Sot's grave pictured in 2016

Shortly after his arrival in Cleveland he died, on September 3, 1844. Ackley, Stockley and other friends took care of the funeral and burial proceedings. A funeral service was held the day following his death at the Second Presbyterian Church. He was then buried at Erie Street Cemetery in downtown Cleveland, an act intended to honor not only Joc-O-Sot but the Native American race. Soon after news of his death became known, he was elected chief of the Sauk. A sandstone gravestone was placed at the gravesite, but it incorrectly lists his death as having occurred in August, instead of September. In all likelihood his remains were body-snatched for the purpose of medical research, in any case his body was confirmed as removed in 1882 Cleveland city records. The tombstone was fractured into three pieces in 1877 when the cemetery caretaker was maintaining a tree at the gravesite, and a heavy limb fell upon it. It was repaired with rivets, but by 1884 was in pieces again. This original tombstone was further damaged by vandals in 1907.

== Status as Chief ==
Controversy surrounds Joc-O-Sot's status as a Chief. Orlando J. Hodge found the claim plausible noting that Joc-O-Sot considered himself a chief and was accustomed to being addressed as such, but noted Joc-O-Sot's youth and lack of distinguishing accomplishments in battle. Oghema Niagara's granddaughter claimed that Joc-O-Sot was among the "greatest chiefs" of his era and was accordingly honored by local tribes and by herself in annual visits. He is known to have been elected as a chief subsequent to his death.

== Folklore surrounding gravesite ==
The Cleveland Paranormal Society attributes the condition of the original tombstone to Joc-O-Sot's distress regarding his inability to return to his tribe. Another local legend recognizes the tombstone's vandals, but states they were supernaturally punished with insanity as a result of a curse placed by Oghema Niagara (Chief Thunderwater). Indeed, Niagara proclaimed that a "terrible disaster" would afflict Cleveland if Joc-O-Sot's burial place were to be further disturbed. Misfortune was said to affect several disparate developers who wished to move the graves for economic purposes. For several years three stalks of maize would grow beside Joc-O-Sot's grave, attributed to a Sauk tribe member who visited regularly.

Joc-O-Sot's supposed ghost has been held responsible by the superstitious for losses by the Cleveland Indians baseball team. Accordingly, tokens of atonement have been placed on his grave in order to deflect game-day interference.
