= Harry Devlin =

American painter and cartoonist

Harry Devlin (March 22, 1918 – November 25, 2001) was an artist and a painter who also worked as a cartoonist for magazines such as Collier's. His work won him the National Cartoonist Society Advertising and Illustration Award for 1956, 1962, and 1963, their Illustration Award for 1977 and 1978, and their Magazine and Book Illustration Award for 1990.

Devlin, and his wife Wende, were residents of Mountainside, New Jersey.

== Biography ==
Harry Devlin was born in Jersey City, New Jersey. He was the second son of Harry G. and Amelia Crawford Devlin. The Devlins first settled in Elizabeth, New Jersey, in 1922, where Devlin attended Thomas Jefferson High School. In 1935, he entered Syracuse University to major in illustration, despite his family's encouragement of a career in medicine. In Devlin's senior year he met Dorothy Wende, a junior from Buffalo, New York majoring in Fine Arts. Dorothy is a distinguished portrait and still life painter, poet and children's book author. In 1939, Harry graduated from Syracuse and moved to a studio in New York City. Harry Devlin married Dorothy Wende in 1941. Harry and Dorothy moved to Mountainside, New Jersey, in 1950, where the couple raised their seven children.

Devlin has been focusing on Victorian Architecture for more than 30 years. There are shows by Harry Devlin at the Morris Museum including a sizable show of children's book illustrations, most of which are in collaboration with his wife, Wende.

Devlin died on November 25, 2001, at the age of 83.

One of his children is artist Alexandra Eldridge, who also became a painter.

== Career ==
Devlin started his career primarily in magazine illustration. After the beginning of World War II, he began his active duty in the U.S. Navy as an ensign, where he was assigned to the Identification and Characteristics Office of Naval Intelligence. There he assumed responsibility for all illustrations and technical drawings published in manuals that were used by U.S. fliers to identify enemy planes. He was so proficient that by 1945, he had illustrated all Japanese, German, and Italian aircraft.

Rising to the rank of lieutenant at the end of World War II, Devlin returned to a private life and began a ten-year association with Collier's Weekly. He created editorial cartoons and illustrations for the magazine’s advertisements and articles. Furthermore, his work also appeared in other publications including the Saturday Home Magazine and the New York Daily News. During the McCarthy era, after refusing to design a pro-McCarthy cartoon, he was fired from these publications.

It was during the 1950s, a period of political uncertainty and the concurrent decline of illustration that Devlin developed a comic strip carried in local papers, the Newark Evening News and the Elizabeth Daily Journal, and syndicated in newspapers as far west as Honolulu. Moreover, Devlin began painting portraits and Victorian architecture. In a collaboration with his wife Dorothy (known as Wende), the couple produced more than two dozen children's books featuring Wende's imaginative writing accompanied by Devlin's colorful and energetic illustrations. The first of these children’s books was Old Black Witch (1963), a story, along with its two sequels, has sold almost two million copies. Harry and Wende Devlin made a comic strip Fullhouse (later retitled to Raggmopp), which ran between 1954 and 1957.

Afterwards Devlin proceeded to renew a long-standing interest in Victorian architecture where he published To Grandfather's House We Go (1967), containing illustrations after paintings he had begun as early as 1954. The clarity of the descriptions and illustrations of architecture made the work not only an educational children's book but also a source book for college courses in architectural history. Devlin published What Kind of a House Is That? shortly after, and in 1989 came his major volume on the subject, Portraits of American Architecture: Monuments to a Romantic Mood, 1830-1900.

Devlin's style results from a technique very similar to contemporary photo-realism as is evident in ‘’Off the Yellow Brick Road’’ (1989). He alters slide images to define his basic composition, but incorporates "high truths" in the form of the removal of offending modern incursions such as telephone poles to infuse a sense of nostalgia and mood. Today, Devlin's works can be found in several New Jersey private, corporate, and museum collections including the Jane Voorhees Zimmerli Art Museum and the Morris Museum of Art.
