= Predrag Pajdic =

Artist, art historian and curator (born 1965)

- Born: 1965 (age 59–60); Slavonski Brod, SR Croatia, SFR Yugoslavia
- Known for: Contemporary Artist
- Website: pajdic.com

Predrag Pajdic (born 1965) is a London-based artist, art historian and curator. He is the founder and editor of the art photography blog "The Pandorian," and his work has been shown internationally and at solo and group exhibitions worldwide. He also writes about and lectures on contemporary art, photography and fashion.

== Early years ==
Pajdic was born to Serbian parents in Slavonski Brod, SR Croatia, SFR Yugoslavia, as one of three children. As a child he was fascinated by his grandfather, a talented bagpipe, violin and cuckoo-clock maker and a father who ran a successful cast iron company. His creative curiosity began at an early age and encompassed a range of influences. As a child, he would imitate birds' songs, collect feathers, mushrooms, flowers and talk to plants and animals.

== Professional life ==
After high school, he moved to London to study fashion design at Central St. Martins College of Art and Design, graduating in 1994. He also attended Courtauld Institute of Art where he earned a master's degree in art history. Following graduation, he began experimenting with materials from tinsel to toilet paper for creations that appeared in video clips, on stages, in films and in New York's Metropolitan Museum.

== The Pandorian ==
As well as curating art publications, producing exhibitions and travelling, Pajdic oversees The Pandorian, which receives more than 1.5 million visitors a month. Portraits of people Pajdic meets and discovers in his travels are woven into blog's narrative. Pajdic has said he prefers to photograph people he meets rather than professional models because of the beauty he finds in every individual. For each subject, Pajdic selects a quote or a time in history to form the basis of the shoot's art direction. The result is more like an online essay in photography form.

== Hail, O Hail, Liberty! ==
In 2011, Pajdic's debuted "Hail, O Hail, Liberty!" on a visual narrative of Greece, which earned him international attention for the century-old costumes combined with local designer wear. "At first glance Athens looks completely chaotic, but then you realise there is a method to its madness and, in some strange way, everything works," says Pajdic.

During the photo shoot, Pajdic spent time wandering Athens accumulating more than 10,000 shots and observing the city's contrasts. "I was confronted with two very contrasting sides of the city: one was contemporary and young, and the other was ancient, steeped with the kind of history you cannot escape. I swear, the first time I went up to the Acropolis I felt I was closer to heaven than I've ever been in my life."

But rather than focus on the differences, he tried to discover the bridges that keep the two worlds connected: "It was kind of like an ongoing dialogue in my head, and that's what this project is all about."

== Instant sharing ==
Like many of his other projects, Hail, O Hail, Liberty! was exclusively created for the web. Pajdic has said he believes the Internet has made it easier for artists to share their work instantly, rather than wait for galleries to display it.

"When I first started out it was kind of hard to part with your work, but nowadays it's all about sharing. We're living in tough times and if I can contribute 0.00000001 points of beauty to this world, I'd want to do it as fast as I can, and nothing can beat the internet for speed. It's a spectacular platform for artistic output and you don't need to wait for the galleries to show your work. You can do it on your own right here, right now."

== Subjects and influences ==
Pajdic is forthcoming in interviews but ultimately rejects the idea of being defined by one thing. He once told an interviewer that he has "always rebelled against the idea of specializing in one thing and doing it for the rest of one's life. There's nothing wrong with it, of course, and we do need experts, but I believe we are capable of learning many different things. Dealing with stereotypes has always been very hard for me. If I had to state one profession for myself, then I really don't know what that would be." Pajdic's subjects are either long term friends, or newly made friends for life. "Sometimes I could be inspired by a book I read, or a person I meet. Most of the time it happens in a moment when I meet a person who would be in my image. It is almost like alchemy between two people, a chemistry between me on one side of a camera and a person I shoot. Sometimes I would have a starting idea but end up shooting something completely different. I often leave things to the very last moment. Without much controlling and planning there is a space in which magic can happen." Pajdic has said his inspirational sources include Leonardo da Vinci, Christian Dior, Cristóbal Balenciaga and Jean Cocteau.

== Shows and exhibitions ==
Pajdic's artwork can be found at the British Museum in London and the Metropolitan Museum of Art in New York City. He was also one of the judges for the prestigious South African contemporary art award Spier Contemporary 2007. His work has been shown internationally in various solo and group exhibitions, including: 'Delay', Museum Boijmans Van Beuningen, Rotterdam (2004); 'To whom it may Concern', nn Foundation for Contemporary Art, Rotterdam (2004); 'The Presidency', Exit Art, New York (2004); 'Memory', Salina Art Center, Salina (2004); 'Garden' Castle Vault, Southampton (2004); 'Terrorvision', Exit Art, New York (2004), 'Blackout', Salon of the Museum of Contemporary Art, Belgrade (2003). In 2010, Pajdic curated Lingering Whispers, a London exhibition of 40 international artists hunting for alternative ways of expression during a worldwide economic crisis. In 2011, About 20 Victorian glass plates were discovered in an attic of a home in Texas, United States. Once cleaned from 100 years of dust, they revealed images of children from a portrait studio. Pajdic partnered with Santa Fe artist Alexandra Eldridge on a project called "There Is No Such Thing As The End," which re-imagined those images on vintage Chinese scrolls through a palimpsest of painting, printing, collage and drawing. Eldridge and Pajdic described the project as a way to bridge the world of the living with that of the dead.

His curatorial projects include Paranoia, Leeds City Art Gallery, 2006, an exhibition of 40 international artists; Recognise, Contemporary Art Platform, London 2007, with more than 40 international artists whose work relates to the Middle East; Paranoia, The Freud Museum London, 2007; This Day, Tate Modern, London, 2007, an eight-part film program about the Middle East; and Dogma, HDLU, Zagreb, Croatia, 2009, a group exhibition with international artists. In 2010 and 2011 Pajdic was The Artistic Director of The International Festival of Contemporary Arts, City of Women, which takes place every October in Ljubljana, Slovenia each year representing works of 60 influential female artists in fields of performance and visual art.

== Beneath the Shadow the Soul Walks ==
During the summer of 2012, Pajdic announced the release of Beneath the Shadow the Soul Walks, an illustrated book featuring 116 images by the artist and eight original stories by JL Nash. According to the artist, the book "celebrates the loveliness in everyone, at all ages, gender, style, type and appearance. What is presented are the purest of naked souls echoed in the faces and bodies of some of the most extraordinary people from across U.S.A., Europe and Asia taken over the period of a year to catch all seasons." More than 70 subjects, ranging in age from 10 to 84, were photographed for the book.
