= David Eldridge =

David Eldridge may refer to:

- David Eldridge (Western Reserve) (died 1797), earliest known person of European descent to die in the Western Reserve, Cleveland, Ohio
- David Eldridge (dramatist) (born 1973), English dramatist
