= Frances Harriet Whipple Green McDougall =

American novelist

Frances Harriet Whipple Green McDougall (September 1805 – 10 June 1878) was an abolitionist, poet, novelist, editor, botanist, spiritualist medium, and advocate of women's, voters', and workers' rights. In contrast to many other 19th-century women writers, throughout most of her adult life she earned her living as an author; at the same time she often donated her writing for causes she believed in, such as the abolition of slavery.

== Life ==
Frances Harriet Whipple was born in Smithfield, Rhode Island in September of 1805. Her father was George Whipple, and she was descended from two of the state's oldest and most distinguished families. After her father went broke, she earned her own living at an early age. She attended local schools in Rhode Island and finished her schooling at a private school in Providence.

McDougall started her literary career by submitting poems to Providence newspapers. In 1829, she founded the literary periodical The Original as editor, catching the attention of critic John Neal, who praised her work in The Yankee, saying that "these are the things we should encourage" and wishing success "to all the she-magazines of our country". The Original ceased after two issues.

Some of her earliest writings were poems printed in the gazettes from 1830 to 1835. Her first volume was Memoirs of Eleanor Elbridge, a colored woman, of which there were sold more than 30,000 copies. In 1841, she published The Mechanic, a book addressed to the operatives of the country, which was much commended in Mr. Brownson's Boston Quarterly Review. In 1844, she published Might and Right, a history of the attempted revolution known as the Dorr Rebellion in Rhode Island. During a part of the year 1842, she conducted The Wampanoag, a journal designed for the elevation of the laboring portion of the community, and thereafter, she was a large contributor to what were called "reform periodicals", particularly The Nineteenth Century, a quarterly miscellany, and The Univercoelum and Spiritual Philosopher, a paper "devoted to philosophico-theology, and an exposition and inculcation of the principles of Nature, in their application to individual and social life". In the autumn of 1848, she became editor of The Young People's Journal of Science, Literature, and Art, a monthly magazine printed in New York.

She gained local recognition for her poetry and in 1838 anonymously penned a best-seller: The Memoirs of Elleanor Eldridge. The profits of this book helped Eldridge retrieve property that had been taken from her unjustly.

In 1842, during the conflict of Rhode Island's Dorr Rebellion, McDougall supported Dorr's efforts to achieve reform of the state's voting laws. After this uprising was harshly suppressed, she fled to Connecticut where she lived "in exile" with her new husband, an artist named Charles Green. Their unhappy marriage ended in 1847 when Frances divorced Charles on grounds of non-support and desertion. She then moved to the area of New York City where she taught botany and wrote for spiritualist publications.

In New York she married spiritualist S. B. Brittan, and contributed articles to spiritualist periodicals. In 1861, she moved to San Francisco. There she lectured and wrote against slavery, worked for women's rights, and served on the board of the first local women's typographical union. She also continued her spiritualist writing. At the age of 57, she married William McDougall, a miner who had been a California assemblyman and was the brother of the state's second governor, John McDougall.

After the death of occultist Paschal Beverly Randolph, McDougall cowrote a text with spiritualist Luna Hutchinson, titled Beyond the Veil, which was purportedly written by Randolph through channelling.

According to Rufus Wilmot Griswold, Green had perhaps entered more largely than any of her countrywomen into discussions of religion, philosophy, and polities. Her views were frequently original and ingenious, and they were nearly always stated with clearness and maintained with force of logic and felicity of illustration. A consideration of them would be more appropriate in a review of her prose-writings; their peculiarities were not disclosed in her poems, of which the only law was the sense of beauty.

She died at the age of seventy two on the 10th of June, 1878, in Oakland, California, and was buried in Mountain View Cemetery.

Griswold remarked in 1852 of Green's work thus:—

"One of the best known of Mrs. Green's poems is The Dwarf's Story, a gloomy but passionate and powerful composition, which appeared in The Rhode Island Book, in 1841. The longest and most carefully finished is Nanuntenoo, a Legend of the Narragansetts, in six cantos, of which the first, second and third were published in Philadelphia in 1848. This is a work of decided and various merit. In Nanuntenoo are shown descriptive powers scarcely inferior to those of Bryant and Carlos Wileox. The rhythm is harmonious, and the style generally elegant and poetically ornate. In the delineations of Indian character and adventure, we see fruits of an intelligent study of the colonial annals, and a nice apprehension of the influences of external nature in psychological development. It is a production that will gratify attention by the richness of its fancy, the justness of its reflection, and its dramatic interest."

The minor poems of Mrs. Green are numerous, and they are marked by idiosyncracies which prove them fruits of a genuine inspiration. Her Songs of the Winds, and sketches of Indian life are frequently characterized by a masculine energy of expression, and a minute observation of nature. Though occasionally diffuse, and illustrated by epithets or images that will not be approved, perhaps, by the most fastidious tastes, they have meaning in them, and the reader is not often permitted to forget the presence of the power and delicacy of the poetical faculty."
