= Alfred P. Aldrich =

South Carolina legislator and judge (1814–1897)

Alfred Proctor Aldrich (June 14, 1814 – February 12, 1897) was a South Carolina state legislator, South Carolina state judge, pronounced advocate for secession from the Union, member of the state constitutional convention of 1865, a delegate to the 1874 taxpayers' convention, and a practicing Confederate during military reconstruction in the state (refusing to call freedmen for jury duty, very mad the U.S. Army prohibited corporal punishment of convicts, etc.)

Raised and educated in Charleston, he passed the bar at age 18. He served as a regimental staff officer in the Seminole War. He served 12 years in the South Carolina state legislature and was Speaker of the Confederate South Carolina House of Representatives during the American Civil War. He served for a time in the war under Maxcy Gregg but broke his shoulder in a rail accident and retired with a disability. He served as a chief of staff or aide-de-camp to Governor Milledge Bonham during the war. He was removed from the bench in 1867 by U.S. military governor Edward Canby. Aldrich then worked as a lawyer in Augusta, Georgia. He was re-elected to the South Carolina bench in 1878.

His son Robert Aldrich also became a South Carolina legislator. Their cousin James Aldrich was also a South Carolina legislator and judge. Their cousin T. Bailey Aldrich was a poet and editor. Alfred P. Aldrich's wife and daughter both wrote accounts representing the experiences of white female Confederates during the American Civil War.

== See also ==
- Second Military District
