= Elkridge =

Elkridge may refer to a location in the eastern United States:

- Elkridge, Maryland, a census-designated place in Howard County
  - Elkridge Farm, a historic slave plantation
  - Elkridge Furnace Complex, National Register of Historic Places designation for the same historic site
  - Elkridge Landing, a seaport
  - Elkridge Landing Middle School
  - Elkridge Site, a nearby archeological site
- Elkridge, West Virginia

== See also ==
- Elk Ridge (disambiguation)
