= Clark Aldrich =

American author and practitioner (born 1967)

- Born: January 3, 1967 (age 59); Concord, Massachusetts, U.S.
- Education: Brown University (BA)
- Occupations: Author; simulation designer; educational technologist
- Known for: Educational simulations; serious games
- Spouse: Muffy Aldrich
- Website: clarkaldrich.com

Clark Aldrich (born January 3, 1967) is an American author and the founder of companies in the interactive learning and serious gaming industry.

== Early life ==
Aldrich grew up in Concord, Massachusetts, where he attended The Fenn School. He then attended the Lawrence Academy at Groton. He earned a bachelor's degree in cognitive science at Brown University in 1989.

== Career ==
Aldrich first worked at Xerox as a speechwriter under Executive Vice President Wayland Hicks. Aldrich was appointed by Governor Paul Cellucci (Republican) to the Massachusetts Joint Committee on Educational Technology from 1996 to 2000, serving as a governor's appointee in Massachusetts. He then moved to Gartner, working in e-learning analysis.

Later, he left Gartner to design educational simulations. He founded SimuLearn, which developed training simulations for use in corporate learning environments. The first product released by the company was Virtual Leader, which simulated the conduct of a series of business meetings while balancing professional interactions. In 2003, Aldrich described the game: "The player is in a room discussing issues with simulated characters—'bots'—whose words and behavior are controlled through artificial intelligence (AI)."

== Personal life ==
Clark Aldrich is married to Muffy Aldrich; the couple have collaborated on lifestyle/blogging projects and photo essays and have published material under the name "The Daily Prep" / "Salt Water New England".

== Books ==
- Aldrich, Clark (2004). Simulations and the Future of Learning. San Diego: Pfeiffer. ISBN 978-0-7879-6962-2.
- Aldrich, Clark (2005). Learning by Doing: A Comprehensive Guide to Simulations, Computer Games and Pedagogy in E-learning and Other Educational Experiences. San Diego: Pfeiffer. ISBN 978-0-7879-7735-1.
- Gibson, David V.; Aldrich, Clark; Prensky, Marc (2006). Games And Simulations in Online Learning: Research and Development Frameworks. IGI Global. ISBN 978-1-59904-304-3.
- Aldrich, Clark (2009). The Complete Guide to Simulations and Serious Games. San Diego: Pfeiffer. ISBN 978-0-470-46273-7.
- Aldrich, Clark (2009). Learning Online with Games, Simulations, and Virtual Worlds: Strategies for Online Instruction. San Diego: Pfeiffer. ISBN 978-0-470-43834-3.
- Aldrich, Clark (2011). Unschooling Rules: 55 Ways to Unlearn What We Know About Schools and Rediscover Education. Austin: Greenleaf. ISBN 978-1-60832-116-2.
