= Joe Eldridge =

Joe Eldridge may refer to:

- Joe Eldridge (cyclist) (born 1982), American cyclist
- Joe Eldridge (musician) (1908–1952), American jazz saxophonist
