= Mount Eldridge =

Mountain in Alaska, United States

- Location within Alaska

Highest point
- Elevation: 10,394 ft (3,168 m)
- Prominence: 1,656 ft (505 m)
- Coordinates: 63°08′05″N 150°20′48″W

Geography
- Location: Matanuska-Susitna Borough, Alaska, United States
- Parent range: Alaska Range
- Topo map: USGS Mount McKinley A-1

Climbing
- Easiest route: Southeast ridge

Mount Eldridge is a 10,082-foot (3,073 m) mountain in the Alaska Range, in Denali National Park and Preserve. Mount Eldridge lies to the northeast of Denali, overlooking Eldridge Glacier. The mountain is a large massif with several summits along a ridge. Mount Eldridge was named in 1953 by Bradford Washburn for U.S. Geological Survey explorer George H. Eldridge.

== See also ==
- Mountain peaks of Alaska
