= Elkridge Site =

- U.S. National Register of Historic Places
- Nearest city: Elkridge, Maryland
- NRHP reference No.: 78001441
- Added to NRHP: May 22, 1978

The Elkridge Site, or Elkridge Prehistoric Village Archeological Site, is an archaeological site near Elkridge in Anne Arundel County, Maryland. It is located on a 20-foot (6.1 m) terrace above the Patapsco River and extends 1,200 feet (370 m) along the river and inland from 20 to 400 feet. It is the only known Woodland period riverine-oriented village site in the tidewater Patapsco River valley, partially escaping the destructive forces of gravel quarrying. The site appears to have been abandoned as a permanent village in the early 16th century.

It was listed on the National Register of Historic Places in 1978.
