= Eldridge, North Dakota =

Unincorporated community in North Dakota, US

Coordinates: 46°54′09″N 98°51′06″W

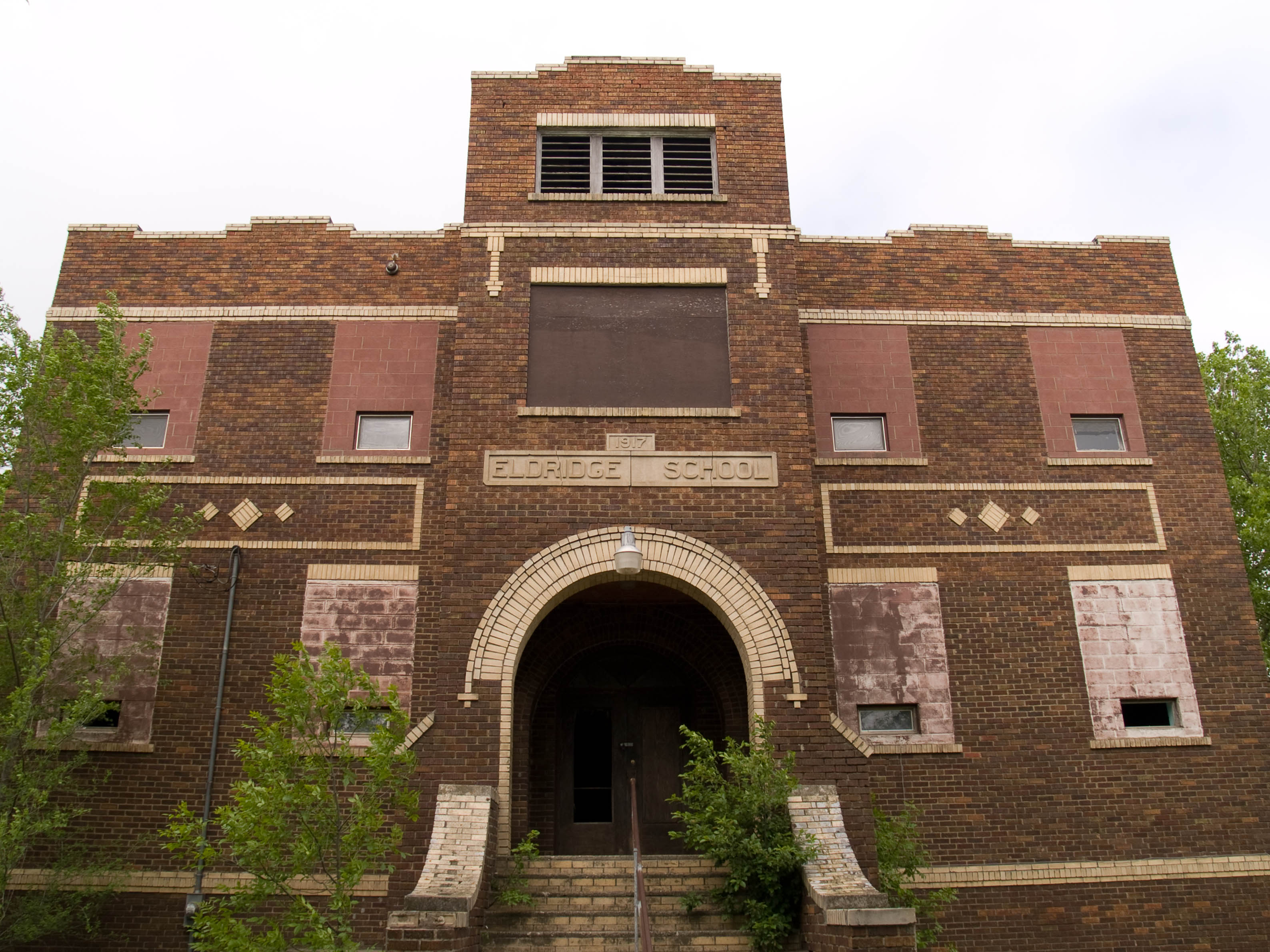
Abandoned Eldridge School

Eldridge is a nearly-deserted unincorporated community in Stutsman County, in the U.S. state of North Dakota.

== History ==
A post office called Eldridge was established in 1880, and remained in operation until 1982. The community was named for a family of settlers. The population was 80 in 1940.
