= Henry Carl Aldrich =

American mycologist (1941–2005)

Henry Carl Aldrich (February 17, 1941 – August 11, 2005) was an American mycologist born in Beaumont, Texas.

== Career ==
Aldrich received his Bachelor's and Doctorate degrees in Botany under C. J. Alexopoulos at the University of Texas. He received his doctorate in 1966 and the same year, was hired as a tenure track professor by the University of Florida in the department of Botany (1966–1976) and later moved to the Department of Microbiology and Cell Sciences (1976–2005). His initial research areas focused on Myxomycetes (true plasmodial slime mold) and viruses. As of 2005, Aldrich was listed as Professor Emeritus with broad research areas including “Ultrastructure of bacteria, fungi and in plants” by University of Florida website. Aldrich has about 120 publications to his name. (Blackwell, 2007).

=== From taxonomy to biochemistry ===
His dissertation research focused on slime mold life stages using Transmission electron microscopy. He became a pioneer in using Electron Microscope, imaging with colorful micrographs and used his expertise to trouble shoot and help any microscopic related issues for graduate students and his colleagues. He was equally appreciated and accredited by them in their publications. Aldrich research highlights include Synaptonemal complexes of prophase I occurring in meiosis takes place after spore cleavage rather than before in three species of Myxomycete (Aldrich, 1967). Biology of Myxomycetes includes organization of myxamoeba and its development into plasmodium (Aldrich 1969). Aldrich and his collaborators (Townsend et al. 2005) were first group to demonstrate a myxomycete Physarum pusillum sporulation on the body of lizard Corytophanes cristatu. In another study Aldrich group elucidated Ultrastructure of in situ anaerobic digester biofilms consisting of methogenic bacteria using scanning and transmission electron microscopy (Robison et al., 1984). Aldrich group was first to report a psychrophilic methogen Methonogenium frigidum sp.nov growing by CO_{2} reduction (Franzman et al., 1997). Sequencing of Propanediol utilization operon provided insight into identification of 16 hypothetical genes (Bobik et al., 1999). Aldrich emphasized more on use of cutting-edge techniques and made enhancements to be cost effective. To benefit the researchers he along with Todd W.J. (1986) compiled a book titled “Ultrastructure techniques for Microorganisms” which elucidates modern techniques like freeze facture, X-ray microanalysis and electron microscopy.

== Memberships ==
Aldrich was a member of Mycologist Society of America. He served as Easter Councilor (1971–1973); Vice president (1982–1983) and President (1984–1985). He was well appreciated for his role in formation of IMC2 Corporation INC in 1977. Aldrich was also a member of the American Society of Microbiology, Southeastern Branch, serving as president (1986–1987) and secretary-treasurer (1995–1996). In 2005, ASM Southeastern branch of ASM honored Aldrich by installing Henry Aldrich Student Research Grants for undergraduate and graduate students (Blackwell, 2007).

== Personal life ==
=== Family ===
Aldrich was married to Dr. Sylvia Coleman. He has two sons Clay Chapman Aldrich (California) and John Clark Aldrich (Texas) from his earlier marriage with Valerie Ann Clark and four grandsons (Blackwell, 2007). Coleman was a Microbiologist at VA hospital in Gainesville and an Adjunct Microbiology Professor at the University of Florida (Minter, 2003). She died on June 25, 2009 (Legacy, 2009). Aldrich died on August 11, 2005, in Gainesville (FL) due to complications of prolonged kidney disease (Gainesville Sun 2005).
