= Eldritch (video game) =

2013 video game

- Publisher: Minor Key Games
- Designer: David Pittman
- Platforms: Microsoft Windows, Linux, OS X
- Release: NA: October 21, 2013
- Genres: First-person shooter, roguelike
- Mode: Single-player

Eldritch is a 2013 first-person shooter video game developed by David Pittman and published by American indie studio Minor Key Games. It was inspired by the writings of H. P. Lovecraft and gameplay elements of roguelike games. The expansion Eldritch: Mountains of Madness was released in December 2013. The game's source code was released in 2014, though the content itself remains proprietary.

== Gameplay ==
Players take the role of a 1920s-era investigator in a Cthulhu Mythos-inspired storyline. Players can wield both pistols and spells. The world is procedurally generated, which means that it is different every time the game is played. The game features a form of permanent death in which all items are lost upon death. Money that has been stored in the bank is retained. After the player wins the game, a new difficulty mode is unlocked, "New Game Plus". Enemies become stronger, helpful items become rarer, and gameplay shifts to a more stealth game-inspired mechanic.

== History ==
=== Development ===
David Pittman wrote and published the game independently after he quit 2K Marin. After his wife, Kim Pittman, helped to finance the game's development, he budgeted for a December 2013 release. He began publicizing the game in September, and unforeseen circumstances pushed the release date forward to October.

=== Release ===
Eldritch was released October 21, 2013. When there were complaints about the shortness of the game, Pittman created a free expansion based on At the Mountains of Madness, a story he had wanted to include more of. Eldritch: Mountains of Madness was released in December 2013.

=== Source code release ===
In April 2014, the game's source code was released to the public under a permissive zlib license, though the content remains proprietary. While still being sold, the game became open-source software, and was ported to alternative platforms like the Pandora.

== Reception ==
Reception

Aggregate score
Aggregator	Score
Metacritic	77/100

Metacritic, a review aggregator, rated it 77/100 based on 14 reviews. Chris Thursten of PC Gamer rated it 72/100. He wrote that the game's initial run-through is fun but too short and easy. Thursten concludes that the unlocked difficulty, "New Game Plus", solves the difficulty issue but leaves nothing new to explore. Rowan Kaiser of IGN rated it 7.7/10 and wrote, "Eldritch is cruel and unpredictable, but this first-person Roguelike is cleverly designed." Alec Meer of Rock, Paper, Shotgun called it a combination of Minecraft and Spelunky that has too little content. Christian Donlan of Eurogamer rated it 8/10 and wrote that it has a "creeping dread" that Lovecraft would enjoy.
