= Shawnee Friends Mission =

Historic church in Oklahoma, United States

- U.S. National Register of Historic Places
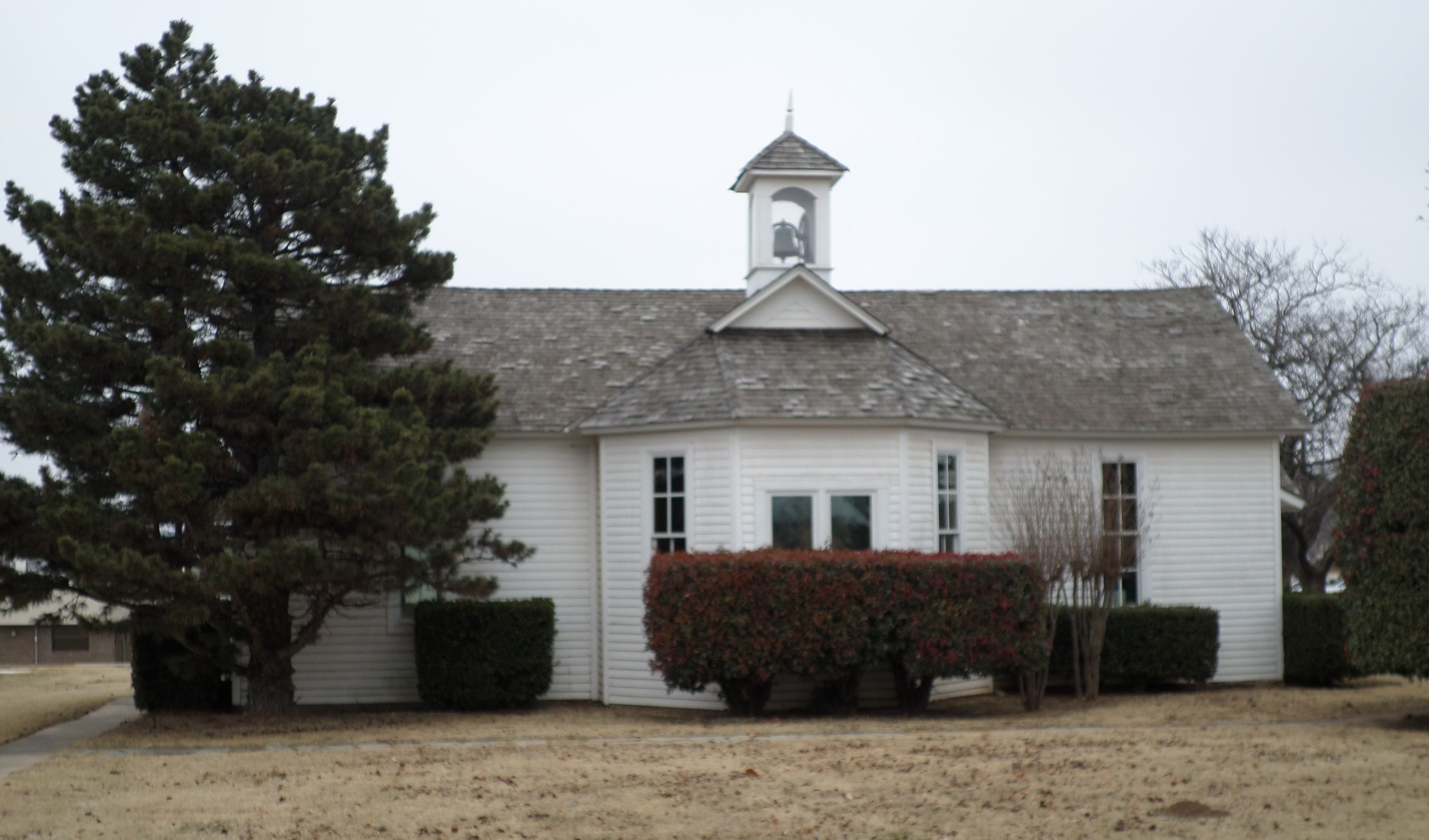
- The church in 2017

- Location within Oklahoma Location within the United States
- Nearest city: Shawnee, Oklahoma
- Coordinates: 35.2937°N 96.9244°W
- Area: 3 acres (1.2 ha)
- Built: c.1880
- NRHP reference No.: 73001569
- Added to NRHP: March 7, 1973

The Shawnee Friends Mission is a historic Quaker mission and meeting house south of Shawnee, Oklahoma. It was built around 1880 and added to the National Register of Historic Places in 1973.

Mission work by the Society of Friends began around 1871. The Friends Meeting House, built was built around 1880 and survives in good condition in 1972.

Joseph Newsom and his family established a day school at the church in 1871, beginning with seven pupils in attendance during the first year. In 1872, the U.S. government transitioned the school into a federal boarding school. The federal government expanded the grounds to include male and female dormitories, employee quarters, a classroom, a kitchen, and a dining area. The boarding school operated until 1923. In 1924, missionary Charles Wooten purchased the property. By 1936, the Pottawatomie County Historical Society had acquired the site, which had fallen into disrepair. The historical society then leased the property for oil extraction, generating essential funds for repairs to restore it. In 1973, the Shawnee Friends Mission property was added to the National Register of Historic Places—Oklahoma’s National Register of Historic Places I.D. number: 73001569. The Citizen Potawatomi Nation opened a Cultural Heritage Center near the site in 2005. The Citizen Potawatomi Nation now maintains the Friends of Shawnee Mission and the surrounding area. The site is located within the Citizen Potawatomi Nation Reservation
