= Eldridge Glacier =

Glacier in Alaska, United States

- Location within Alaska
- Interactive map of Eldridge Glacier
- Type: Valley glacier
- Location: Matanuska-Susitna Borough, Alaska, U.S.
- Coordinates: 63°01′24″N 150°07′26″W
- Length: 30 miles (48 km)

Eldridge Glacier is a major glacier in Denali National Park and Preserve in the U.S. state of Alaska. The 30-mile (48 km) long glacier originates on the east side of Explorers Peak, flowing northeast to a basin below Mount Eldridge, gathering flow from several glaciated cirques, then flowing southeast to the valley of the Chulitna River, where it gives rise to the Fountain River. A large unnamed tributary glacier joins Eldridge Glacier a few miles above its terminus.

== See also ==
- List of glaciers
