= Aldridge, Texas =

Ghost town in Texas, US

Aldridge is a ghost town in Jasper County, Texas, United States.

Formerly located on the Burr's Ferry, Browndell, and Chester Railroad, the town's economy was based on the lumber industry. However, in the 1910s, the city's sawmill burned down multiple times, and in 1927 the railroad line running through the city was abandoned due to exhaustion of the local wood resources.
