= Wanette–Byars Bridge =

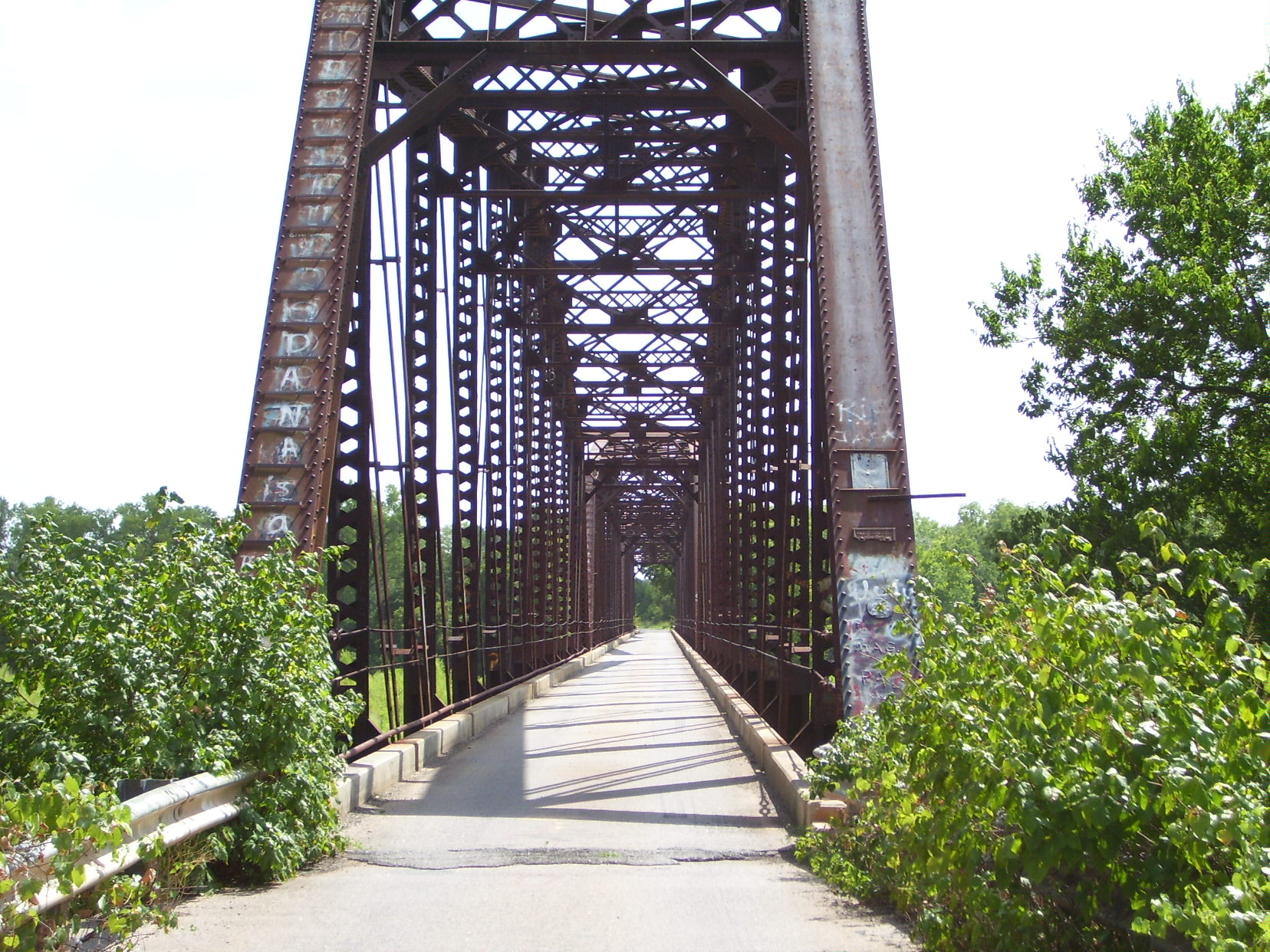
- A view through the bridge's portal
- Coordinates: 34°55′12″N 97°03′00″W
- Carries: 1 lane of Drummond Road
- Crosses: Canadian River
- Locale: Wanette-Byars, Oklahoma
- Maintained by: McClain Co./Pottawatomie Co.

Characteristics
- Design: Camelback truss
- Total length: 780 feet (238 m)
- Longest span: 265 feet (81 m)

Location
- Interactive map of Wanette–Byars Bridge

- Old Santa Fe Railroad Bridge
- U.S. National Register of Historic Places
- Location within Oklahoma Location within the United States
- Nearest city: Wanette, Oklahoma
- Coordinates: 34°55′13″N 97°3′4″W
- Area: less than one acre
- Built: 1903
- Architectural style: Camel Back-Through Truss
- NRHP reference No.: 10000070
- Added to NRHP: March 10, 2010

The Wanette–Byars Bridge is a long bridge in central Oklahoma. It crosses the Canadian River between Byars in McClain County and Wanette in Pottawatomie County. The bridge is on a county road, not a state-designated highway.

The bridge was built in 1902 by the American Bridge Company to serve as a rail bridge connecting Pauls Valley with Shawnee. It was later converted to a one-lane bridge for auto traffic. The bridge is of the camelback truss design and is composed of three spans, each 265 feet (81 m). Each of these spans are the longest in Oklahoma.

Until 1992, the bridge had a wooden deck. In 1992, the bridge's deck was destroyed by arson, closing it for two years. When the bridge reopened, it had a concrete and asphalt driving surface.

The bridge is an oft-utilized link between Byars and Wanette. The two nearest bridges are between fifteen and twenty-five miles (24–40 km) away.

It was listed on the National Register of Historic Places in 2010 as Old Santa Fe Railroad Bridge and has also been denoted as Structure #63D3342E1446000 and as Flynn Bridge. It is a Camel Back-Through Truss bridge. It is 785 feet (239 m) long.
