= Lorenzo Carter (settler) =

American settler (1767–1814)

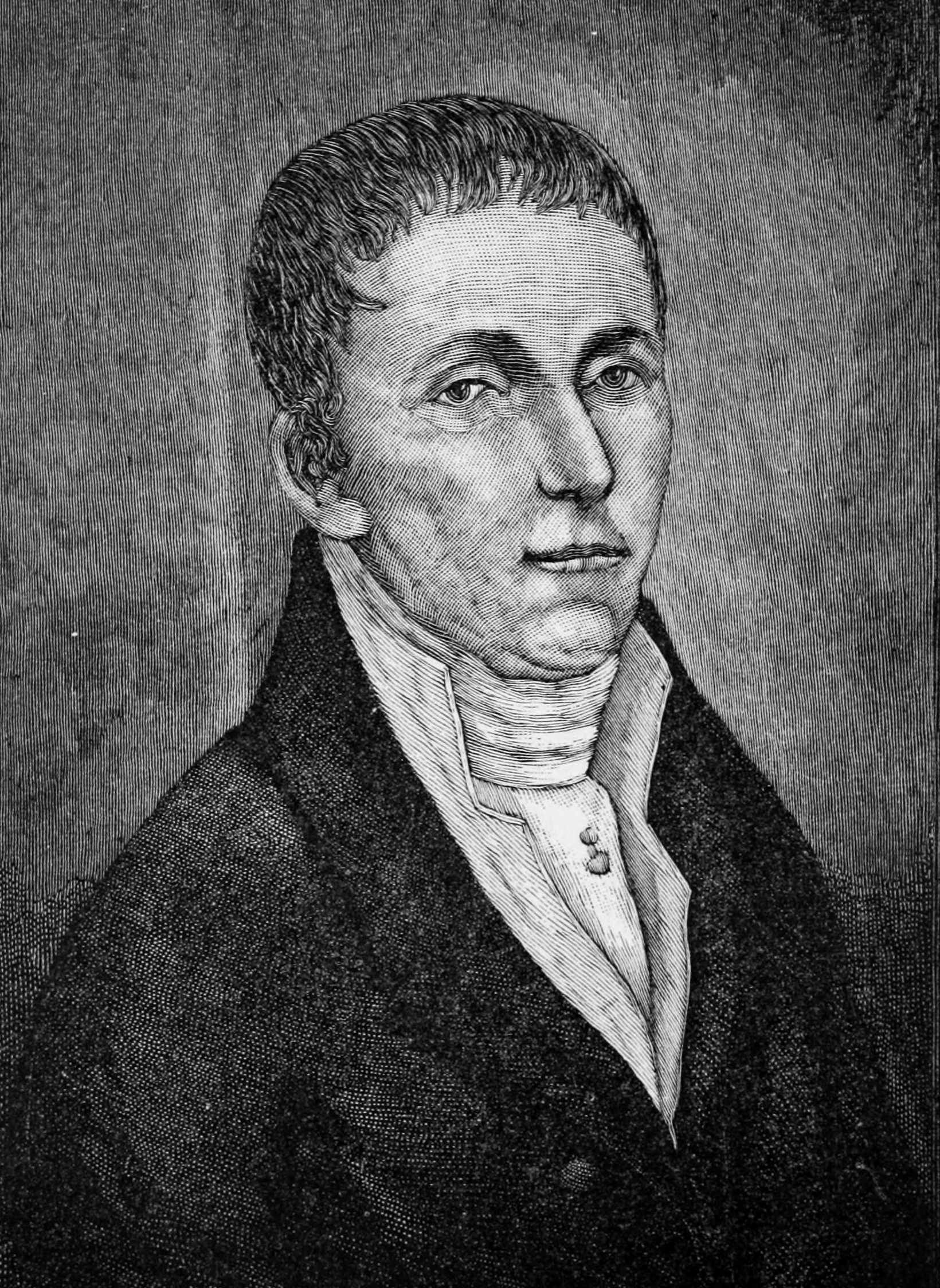
Major Lorenzo Carter

Major Lorenzo Carter was the first permanent settler in Cleveland, Ohio, United States.

Born in 1767, Carter spent his early years in Warren, Connecticut, where he visited the local library frequently and developed an appreciation of books. When his father, Elazer Carter enlisted in the Continental Army when Lorenzo was 11 years old, he came home from his temporarily disbanded unit and died of smallpox. About seven years later when his widowed mother remarried and moved to Vermont, the 18-year-old Lorenzo struck out on his own. Within four years, Lorenzo Carter bought his own land, cleared it, farmed it and married Rebecca Fuller. Lorenzo Carter is described as a swarthy, muscular man whose "gaze and speech were as direct as his actions". Carter was a natural leader whose "interests transcended farming or making a living." In 1797 he left with his brother-in-law for the New Connecticut settlement of Cleaveland (now Cleveland) via Canada. Lorenzo Carter bought Lot 199, nearly 2 acres (8,100 m^{2}) of land for $47.50. Carter made friends with the local Native Americans and it was his friendship with Chief Seneca (also known as Stigwanish) that kept the Cleaveland colony alive through years of disease, floods and poor crops.

== Legacy ==
After building a frame house and preparing to move in Lorenzo Carter's new home was burned down by children playing with wood shavings and only in 1803 was a two-room log cabin home finished for the family. In 1802 he also built the Carter Tavern which became a somewhat informal town hall, hotel, and religious meeting house. In 1804 the state of Ohio promoted Carter to Major and he was given the responsibility of the Cleaveland battalion. In 1808 he built a trading vessel 30 ton schooner called the Zephyr that traded furs for goods like salt. Carter was also an active member of the first library association in Cleveland which was formed in 1811 but quickly dissolved under the pressures of the War of 1812. Lorenzo's father, Lt. Elazer Carter handed down to him and the generations that followed the flag he carried during The Revolutionary War. The flag passed to Lorenzo's grand daughter, Selena Silsby Brockway who in turn passed it to her grand daughter Alice Henderson. The flag eventually ended up being passed to her grandson John (Jack) Penty Jr. The flag is one of the original flags made when there were still 13 British colonies. The Revolutionaries determined the stars and stripes would signify the Republic they were fighting to form. It is made of homespun linen and handstitched. The red stripes were dyed with cranberries and the blue with elderberries. Thirteen stars are scattered across a light blue background. This flag is about 8' by 10'. This flag was made during the Revolution before this country was even formed. The word "LIBERTY" is sewn onto the flag and it now resides in The Western Reserve Historical Society.

== Law ==
The common saying that "Major Carter was all the law Cleveland had." is seen in two documented incidents. After hearing from his wife that a local Native American teen named John Omic had chased her around her home with a knife after she told him to stop taking vegetables from her garden, Carter visited the Omic home on the west bank of the Cuyahoga River. He told John Omic's father that if John ever crossed the river again "I’ll hang him up to the first tree in five minutes."

In another exhibition of frontier justice, Lorenzo Carter prevented two Kentuckians from returning an African named Ben to slavery. In the spring of 1806 Ben survived a shipwreck that killed everyone else on board just after setting sail from the nearby community of Rocky River. Starving, frostbitten and suffering from rheumatism Ben was taken to Carter's tavern where the ravages of frostbite took some of his toes. Under Lorenzo Carter's care, Ben was allowed to recover and regained his strength. In October two Kentuckians arrived in Cleaveland claiming to own Ben. Carter responded them saying "I don’t like Niggers, but I don’t believe in slavery, and Ben shan’t be taken away unless he chooses to go." Carter allowed a parley between the Kentuckians and Ben over a stream and it ended peaceably. However, in a move that no historian has been able to explain, Ben was taken out of Cleaveland by the Kentuckians the next day. In what has been termed a rescue, two men who worked for Carter stopped them at gun point and told Ben to make a break for the woods. Ben jumped off the horse and ran into the woods while the two men covered him and then followed him. The Kentuckians never returned and Ben settled in the Brecksville/Independence area of Ohio until he left for Canada.

== Death ==
Major Lorenzo Carter died at his tavern in February 1814 after an arduous battle with cancer. The cancer first manifested itself on his face and after consulting physicians in the East, he withdrew to an upper room where he refused all visitors. He even refused the ministrations of his wife who would sit on the stairs outside of his door and pray, while he loudly agonized from the pain. (Wickham, 1914) He was 47 when he died. Lorenzo Carter is buried at the Erie Street Cemetery.

== Descendants of Lorenzo Carter ==
- Edwin and Virginia Carter (Cleveland, Ohio)
- Meril Gene Carter Austin, Texas (1912-2001)
- Miles Gene Carter Cleveland, Ohio (1933-2019)
- John Miles Carter Cleveland, Ohio
- Michelle Langevin Carter Austin, Texas (Birth 1972)
- Jeremy Carter Kaplan St. Charles, IL (Birth 2010)
- Meryl Rose Kaplan St. Charles, IL (Birth 2010)
- Jayne Sullivan NY, NY (Birth 1951)
- Helen Maeder Sullivan Bronx, NY. (Birth 1917)
- Gertrude Able Maeder Cleveland, OH (Birth 1894)
- Timothy Michael Kurcz Cleveland, OH (Birth 1973)
- Alexandria Elizabeth Kurcz Cleveland, OH (Birth 2006)
- Ava Elizabeth Kurcz Cleveland, OH (Birth 2010)
