= Tom Eldridge =

Australian rules footballer

Personal information
- Full name: Thomas Arthur Eldridge
- Born: 22 September 1923; Melbourne, Victoria, Australia
- Died: 18 January 2006 (aged 82); Clontarf, Queensland
- Original team: Carlton District
- Height: 182 cm (6 ft 0 in)
- Weight: 72 kg (159 lb)

Playing career^{1}
Years	Club	Games (Goals)
1946–47	Carlton	7 (1)
1947, 1951–52	Yarraville (VFA)	16 (3)
- ^{1} Playing statistics correct to the end of 1952.

Thomas Arthur Eldridge (22 September 1923 – 18 January 2006) was an Australian rules footballer who played with Carlton in the Victorian Football League (VFL).

== Family ==
The son of Alfred William Eldridge (1893-1982), and Minne Elizabeth Eldridge (1897-1970), née Long, Thomas Arthur Eldridge was born in Melbourne on 22 September 1923.

He married Joyce Theresa Hopgood (1925-1960) in 1943. He remarried in 1964. His second wife was Dorothy May Maxfield (1934-2007).

== Military service ==
Eldridge enlisted to serve in the Australian Army during World War II in late 1941, soon after his eighteenth birthday. He served with the 59th Battalion, a unit trained for the defence of northern Australia, and served in New Guinea for six months in 1943. He was wounded in action in 1943. At the end of the war he returned to Melbourne and was discharged in February 1946.

== Football ==
=== Carlton (VFL) ===
Soon his discharge, Eldridge was listed in the Carlton squad. He made his senior debut, at full-forward, in the match against Geelong, at Princes Park, on 17 June 1946. Carlton won comfortably but Eldridge managed just one goal, and was dropped to the reserves bench the following week. All but one of his remaining Carlton appearances were from the bench.

=== Yarraville (VFA) ===
In 1947 he transferred to Yarraville Football Club — without a clearance — where he served as captain in 1951 and 1952.

== Death ==
He died at Clontarf, Queensland on 18 January 2006.
