= Elbridge =

Elbridge may refer to:

== Places ==
=== United States ===
- Elbridge Township, Edgar County, Illinois
- Elbridge Township, Michigan
- Elbridge, New York, a town
  - Elbridge (village), New York, part of the town

=== Canada ===
- Elbridge, Alberta

== Other uses ==
- Elbridge (given name)
- Elbridge Engine Company, an aircraft engine manufacturer
