= John Eldridge =

John Eldridge may refer to:

- John Eldridge (politician) (1872–1954), Australian politician
- John Eldridge (British Army officer) (1898–1985)
- John Eldridge (sociologist) (1936–2022), British sociologist
- John Eldridge Jr. (1903–1942), United States Navy officer
- John Eldridge (director) (1917–1962), British film director
- John C. Eldridge (1933–2018), justice of the Maryland Court of Appeals

== See also ==
- John Eldredge (born 1960), author and lecturer on Christianity
- John Eldredge (actor) (1904–1961), American actor
