= Aldridge Hotel (Shawnee, Oklahoma) =

- U.S. National Register of Historic Places
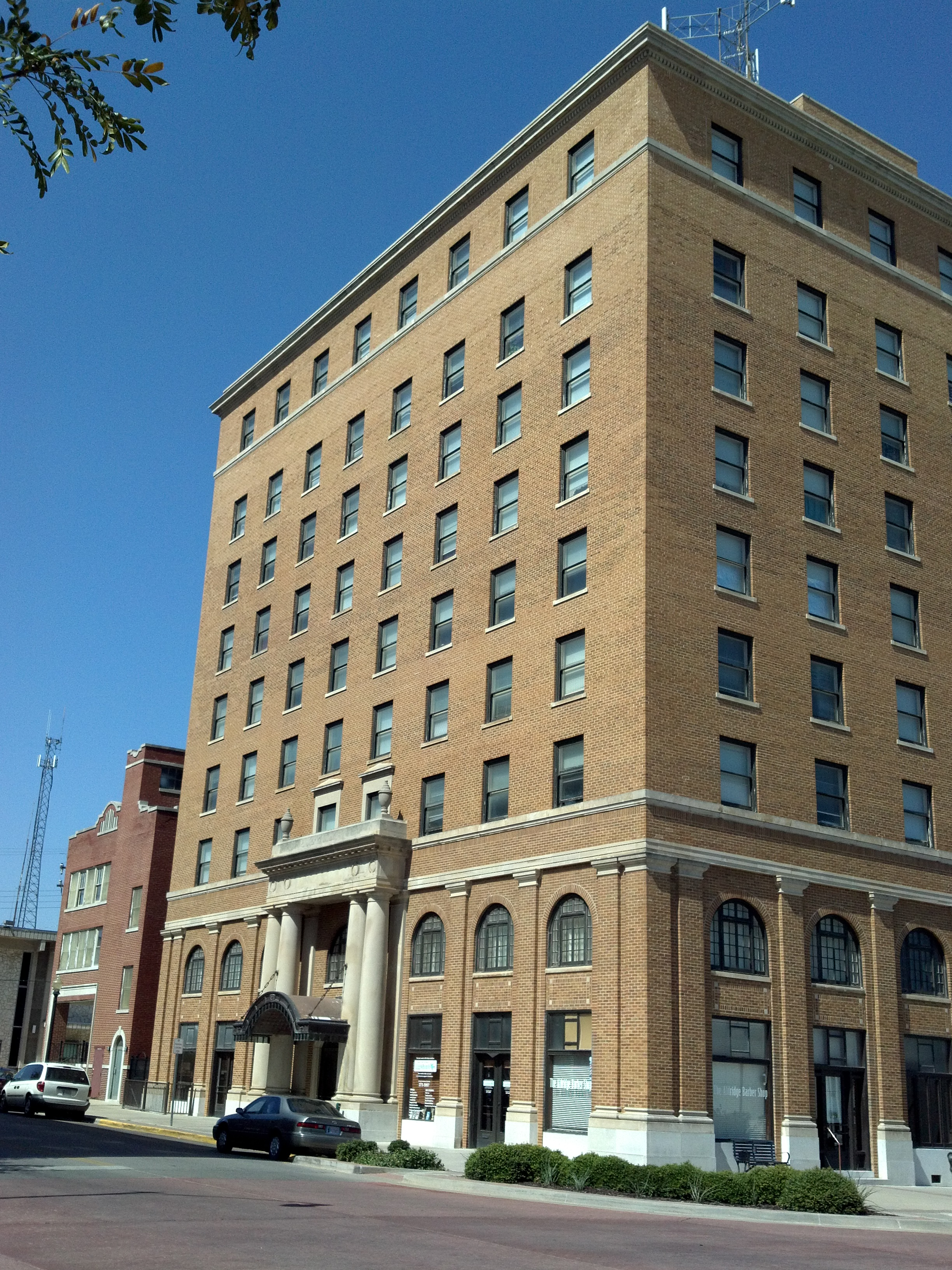
- Aldridge Hotel in 2012
- Location: Shawnee, Oklahoma
- Coordinates: 35°19′44″N 96°55′21″W
- Built: 1928
- Architect: Albon C. Davis; G.P. Carr
- Architectural style: Early Commercial and Classical Revival
- NRHP reference No.: 00000622
- Added to NRHP: June 2, 2000

The Aldridge Hotel, also called the Aldridge Building Senior Apartments or just the Aldridge Apartments, is a landmark historic structure in Shawnee, Oklahoma. It has been on the National Register of Historic Places listings in Pottawatomie County, Oklahoma since 2000.

== History ==
Originally called the Hilton Phillips Hotel after the oil baron who constructed it for $750,000 in 1928, the building’s future was immediately dimmed by the Great Depression. It was sold in 1930 to the Aldridge Hotel Co., and so acquired the Aldridge name. Ten stories tall and host to 200 rooms, the establishment had numerous amenities including dining and banquet rooms, a laundry, and even a bakery.

Closed in 1994, the building was put on the National Register of Historic Places on June 2, 2000. Following seven million dollars in renovations, the building reopened in 2005 as the Aldridge Apartments. It is now a complex for seniors aged 62 and up and has been reconfigured with one- and two-bedroom apartments.

== Style ==
The building’s style is called Early Commercial and Classical Revival. The lobby and some other areas are available for public visits.
