= Marie D. Eldridge =

American statistician

- Born: Marie Matilda Delaney; June 1, 1926
- Died: June 13, 2009 (aged 83); Chapel Hill, North Carolina, U.S.
- Education: Notre Dame of Maryland University; Johns Hopkins University
- Spouse: Paul Eldridge
- Scientific career
- Fields: Statistics
- Workplaces: National Highway Traffic Safety Administration

Marie Delaney Eldridge (June 1, 1926 – June 13, 2009) was an American statistician. She was director of statistics and analysis at the National Highway Traffic Safety Administration, a director of the Research Triangle Institute, president of the Washington Statistical Society, and since 1969 a Fellow of the American Statistical Association.

Her maiden name was Marie Matilda Delaney. Originally from Baltimore, she did her undergraduate studies at the College of Notre Dame of Maryland, graduating in 1948. After working in industry for the Revere Copper Company, she obtained a master's degree in 1953 from Johns Hopkins University.

For the next several decades she worked in the federal government, beginning with the Social Security Administration and the Bureau of Labor Statistics in the 1950s. Her husband, Paul Eldridge, was also a statistician in the federal government, working primarily in aviation. She was chief of advisory and development services for the United States Department of Education in the early 1960s, transferred to the National Institute of Mental Health in 1962, and then transferred again to the predecessor to the United States Postal Service in 1966. By the early 1970s, she worked for the National Highway Safety Administration, where she directed the Office of Statistics and Analysis. From 1978 until her retirement in 1984, she worked at the National Center for Education Statistics.

She served on the board of directors of the Research Triangle Institute from 1983 to 1988 before retiring again and supporting herself as a realtor. She died in Chapel Hill, North Carolina, of multiple myeloma.
