= Anne Reeve Aldrich =

American poet and novelist

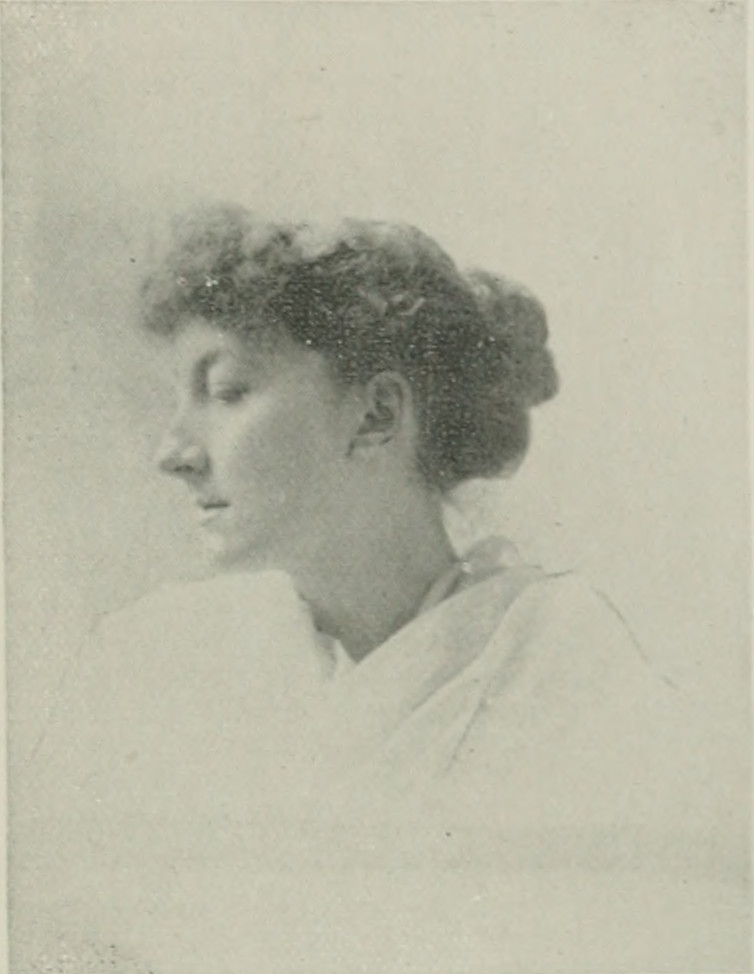
- Portrait of Aldrich from "A Woman of the Century"
- Born: April 25, 1866; New York City
- Died: June 28, 1892 (aged 26)
- Occupations: poet and novelist
- Writing career
- Notable work: The Rose of Flame: And Other Poems of Love (1889)

Anne Reeve Aldrich (April 25, 1866 – June 28, 1892) was an American poet and novelist. Her works include The Rose and Flame and Other Poems and The Feet of Love.

== Biography ==
Aldrich was born in New York City on April 25, 1866. Her father died when she was eight; her mother moved to the country, where she educated Aldrich. By the time she was a teenager, Aldrich was proficient in composition and rhetoric, and was able to translate French and Latin literature into English, and to name many local plants and insects.

Aldrich wrote poetry often from a young age. At age 17, she was published in Lippincott's Monthly Magazine. Poems in other periodicals followed and eventually led to published collections of poems.

Her first volume of poetry, The Rose of Flame, was published in 1889. A second volume, Songs About Love, Life, and Death, was published posthumously.

Aldrich died at the age of 26 in New York on June 28, 1892.

== Selected works ==
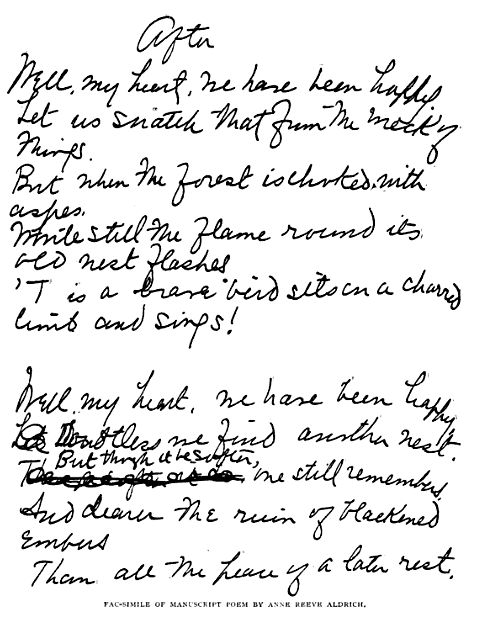
Facsimile of a poem draft by Anne Reeve Aldrich

- The Rose of Flame: And Other Poems of Love (New York: G.P. Putnam's Sons, 1889)
- The Feet of Love (New York: Worthington Co, 1890)
- Songs About Life, Love and Death (New York: C. Scribner's Sons, 1892)
- Nadine and Other Poems (New York, 1893)
- Gabriel Lusk (New York: C.T. Dillingham, 1894)
- A Village Ophelia (New York: G.W. Dillingham, 1899)
