= Alexandra Eldridge =

American painter

- Born: November 2, 1948 (age 77); Mountainside, New Jersey, United States
- Known for: Contemporary Artist
- Website: AlexandraEldridge.com

Alexandra Eldridge (born 1948) is an American contemporary painter. Her mixed-media paintings have been acclaimed for their symbolic imagery, rich colors, textures, and devotion to the written word.

== Early years ==
Alexandra Eldridge was born in Mountainside, New Jersey and spent her childhood in a large Victorian house as one of seven children of Harry Devlin and Wende Devlin, who wrote and illustrated 27 children's books and collaborated on two nationally syndicated comic strips: Fullhouse, which was based on the life of their busy household; and Raggmopp, which told the family's story through their dog's eyes. Eldridge's parents were both portrait painters and Harry wrote and illustrated books on American architecture.

== Golgonooza ==
Eldridge attended Ohio University, where she was in the Honors Cutler Program majoring in fine arts and creative writing and graduated summa cum laude. In 1969, she married her art professor, Aethelred Eldridge, and settled into a 70-acre farm near Athens, Ohio that was based on the writings, teachings and philosophy of Romantic-era poet and painter William Blake. The farm and arts organization which also included an establishment for the handmade book, was called Golgonooza after Blakes’ visionary city of art. During that period at Golgonooza, Eldridge gave birth to two boys, Saxon and Sebastian. She painted, ran the arts program, grew organic vegetables and became immersed in reading Blake's works. On weekends, students and travelers came for readings, plays, pageants and outdoor performances. “It was our land and our property, but was somewhat communal. Our life was about the discussion of art, and the discussion of art and spirituality…People came from all over just to be in the midst of this sort of thing." Her life at Golgonooza lasted 17 years. “I had to leave that situation --- the community and my husband. I had to leave to become my own teacher. I went to see a psychic for the first time in my life. She told me that I was going to the Southwest. I said that I knew nothing about it. She said that the Southwest is where you need to be.”

== Santa Fe ==
In 1987, following her divorce, she moved to Santa Fe to raise her children and pursue her career in art with studies at the Santa Fe Institute of Fine Art and workshops in Florence, Cambridge, and New York. She continues to reside in Santa Fe.

== Influences ==
Eldridge has described her work as metaphorical and mytho-poetic. She says she is influenced by mysticism and has adopted many of Blake's views of spirituality and its connection to art. She has also cited influences such as Carl Jung, the poetry of Rainer Maria Rilke, filmmaker Andrei Tarkovsky and the teachings of Rumi.

== Style ==
Eldridge works in mixed media on paper or panel. She uses Venetian plaster and creates images with pigment, pencil, and elements of collage. She rarely uses paint, instead she scratches through layers of the plaster to make lines. She burnishes the final layer to make the work shine and reveal the colors beneath. The colorful surfaces are distressed and incised with symbols, words, phrases and collage. Eldridge has said her paintings have a narrative, but without a beginning or end.

Eldridge has described the process as an attempt to seek the unknown, "to go deeply in to the heart of the mystery, to make the soul fly out of things. I’ll go into the studio and begin. I may be in some curious state of being. I'll paint for a number of hours, and then, all of a sudden it reveals itself to me -- what's going on with me. Tears start coming up and all the other strong feelings. All this conspires and works together. I'm in a state of joy -- near ecstasy -- when I'm painting. Art is about an encounter with something -- whether it be the unseen, an emotion, a feeling -- and then you have to have the courage to collaborate with that. My work also has a lot to do with the need to sensually connect to another or to my own deepest regions. Love motivates me enormously."

== Symbolism ==
Eldridge has been credited with creating her own vocabulary of symbols. Ordinary objects like birthday cakes, rabbits, ladders, and eggs often appear in her works. After the death of close friend in 2011, Eldridge said she found significance an image of a triptych of ladders. “Each ladder came into being as a revelation to me, each offering a deeper understanding of self-exploration, of death, of rebirth, and of the existence of eternity.” After spending three-weeks in India, she returned to Santa Fe where a friend was dying from a terminal illness. “I spent three weeks in India --- slowing down, getting very still. Boats and water appeared in my painting when I returned. I see the boats as symbols of being guided on the waters of the collective unconscious. There is a watery feeling to the work in the technique as well as in the images. Everything is dissolving as the new self insists on being born.” Although her images are infused with meanings, Eldridge has said, "It is tempting, perhaps even comforting, to want to nail images down with meaning. But that can kill an image's ability to grow and to instruct.” Eldridge says much of her work is spontaneous. "It's amazing how much the unconscious is always at play. This self-discovery is always going on. This stuff comes through and then you stand back and you look and say, 'Look at who you are now.'"

== Travel ==
Eldridge has said travelling is an important part of her creative process. She has had artist residencies on the Island of Elba, Italy and the Valparaiso Foundation in Almeria, Spain. While spending a month in Paris, she said she took on the role of a wanderer. “I came to see that this sensibility of the ‘aimless stroller’---vigilant, alert, with no destination, moving easily from the interior to the exterior worlds---was my sensibility.” During her time in Paris, she was invited to paint a mural in the city’s 17th century Palace des Vosges. While elements of her travels appear in her work, Eldridge says she does not paint pictures of foreign lands. Rather, her images are of inner landscapes, to look at her paintings is as if to interrupt a fairy tale or dream. Often, parts of the places she visits emerge in her work. For example, when she was staying in a medieval monastery on the Island of Elba off the coast of Italy, she mixed the beach’s black sand into the plaster of one painting. In Morocco, she bought pigments at a marketplace and stirred them into a new work. Other bits of Morocco began to appear in her work in the colors of pink and red, as well as the inclusion of old doors.

== Acclaim ==
Eldridge has had dozens of solo exhibitions and participated in many group shows throughout the United States and abroad, including New York, Paris, Belgrade and London. Her work has been used on covers of eight books of poetry. Celebrity collectors include actors Steve Buscemi, Edie Falco and William Hurt who said, “there are two tides, one of light and another of muffling, suffocating...absence. Alexandra is clearly in the light." She has also been featured on an “Art in Santa Fe” feature by television personality Rachel Ray.

In 2011, About 20 Victorian glass plates were discovered in an attic of a home in Houston, Texas. Eldridge acquired the plates from a friend, and once cleaned from 100 years of dust, they revealed images of fairy-like children from a Texas portrait studio from around 1900. Eldridge partnered with London artist Predrag Pajdic on a project called "There Is No Such Thing As The End," which re-imagined those images on vintage Chinese scrolls through a palimpsest of painting, printing, collage and drawing. Eldridge described the project as a way to bridge the world of the living with that of the dead.
