= David Eldridge (Western Reserve) =

Early American settler (died 1797)

- Died: June 3, 1797; Grand River, Western Reserve (near present-day Painesville, Ohio)
- Cause of death: Drowning
- Resting place: Erie Street Cemetery, Cleveland, Ohio
- Occupation: Employee of the Connecticut Land Company
- Years active: 1797

David Eldridge (died 3 June 1797) is the earliest known person of European descent to die in the Western Reserve, and the first person to be buried in the newly created city of Cleveland. One of the employees of the Connecticut Land Company, he drowned at about 11:00am on June 3, 1797, while attempting to swim his horse across the Grand River, despite being strongly advised to the contrary. He was nearly an hour in the water, before his body could be pulled out. Boats were put into the river, and Rev. Seth Hart, superintendent of the surveying party, used every precaution to save him, without effect. His corpse was brought to the Cuyahoga River.

On the morning of June 4, a piece of land was selected for burial, on the north parts of lot 97 and 98, between Prospect and Huron streets, on the east side of Ontario street. Members of the party used wooden boards to build a strong box for a coffin. They placed him in, and strung the box on a pole with cords, to carry him up to the burial ground. A funeral service was held, and a fence was built around the grave. He was one of three in the surveying party to die that season; William Andrews and Peleg Washburn both died of dysentery at Cleveland, in August or September, and were buried next to Eldridge. The original burial ground was moved to Erie Street in 1835. His remains are now located in the Erie Street Cemetery in Cleveland. In the early 2000s, while improvements were being made to buildings currently on the original location of his burial, human bones were discovered.
