= Aldrich =

Aldrich may refer to:

== Places ==
=== United States ===
- Aldrich, Alabama, an unincorporated community
- Aldrich, Minnesota, a city
- Aldrich Township, Wadena County, Minnesota
- Aldrich, Missouri, a village

=== Elsewhere ===
- Aldrich Bay, Hong Kong, a former bay

== People ==
- Aldrich (surname), including a list of people with the surname
- Aldrich Ames (1941–2026), American intelligence officer convicted of spying for the Soviet Union and Russia

== Fictional characters ==
- the title characters of The Aldrich Family, an American radio teenage sitcom (1939–1953), films, television and comic books
- Aldrich Killian, a Marvel Comics supervillain
- Aldrich, Devourer of Gods, an antagonist in the video game Dark Souls III

== Other uses ==
- Aldrich, a subsidiary of Sigma-Aldrich, a life science and high technology company

== See also ==
- Aldrich House (disambiguation)
- Aldrich Mansion, Warwick, Rhode Island, United States, on the National Register of Historic Places
- Aldrick
