= James Aldrich (politician) =

American politician

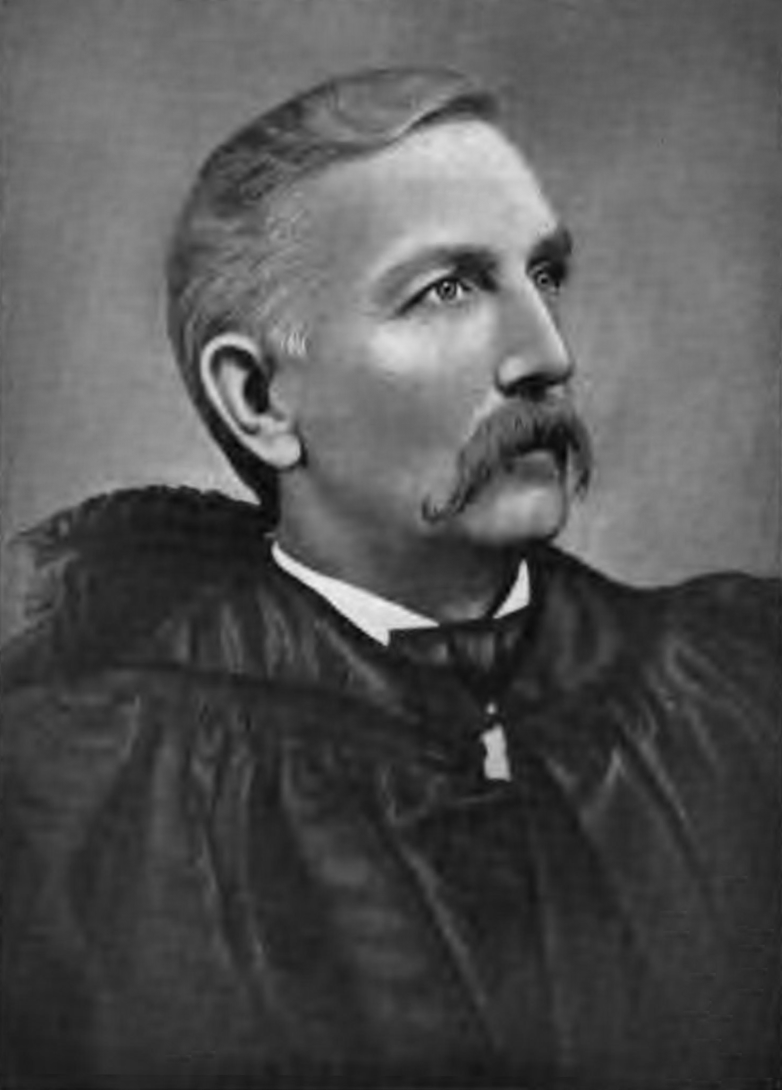

Member of the South Carolina House of Representatives
- In office 1878–1884
- In office 1886–1889

Personal details
- Born: July 25, 1850 Barnwell, South Carolina
- Died: January 23, 1910 (aged 59) Aiken, South Carolina
- Party: Democratic
- Occupation: Jurist, politician

James Aldrich (July 25, 1850 – January 23, 1910) was a South Carolina circuit judge and state representative.

== Biography ==
Aldrich was born in Barnwell, South Carolina on July 25, 1850, the son of a prominent attorney, James T. Aldrich, and Isabel Coroneous Patterson. He attended private school until the Civil War interrupted, and was then home schooled. He also worked on the family farm as a child. In the closing days of the war, he joined a local militia unit. The war left his family nearly destitute, and Aldrich supplemented the household income hauling goods. He attended Washington and Lee University beginning in 1869, but was forced by circumstances to leave school in 1872. He read law, and in 1873 was admitted to the bar. He moved to Aiken, South Carolina. On December 15, 1874, he married Fannie Lebby. In 1876, he served as a defense attorney in the Ellenton riots and the Hamburg Massacre, both of which ended in mistrials.

He was held in high esteem by local Democrats after the trials, and was elected to the State House in 1878. He served as a member of the South Carolina House of Representatives till 1884. He returned to the House in 1886, and this time served until 1889, when he was elected to the circuit court. While a representative, he was a member of the Judiciary Committee, and chaired the Committee on Incorporation. In 1889 he was elected to serve the Second Circuit Court as a judge and served on the Bench for eighteen years. He died at his daughter's home in Aiken on January 23, 1910.

== Sources ==
- Garlington, J. C. Men of the Time. page3. 1902. Garlington Publishing Co. Google Books. Online. January 11, 2008.
- Brooks, Ulysses Robert. South Carolina Bench and Bar. pp 270 – 273. The State company. 1908. Online. Google Books. January 14, 2009.
- Snowden, Yates and Harry Gardner Cutler. History of South Carolina. pp 13 -14. Leis. 1920. Online. Google Books. January 14, 2009.
- State Historical Society of Iowa Iowa Journal of History. The State Historical Society of Iowa. 1910.
