= Tornado outbreak of April 6–8, 2006 =

Major tornado outbreak 2006 in the United States

- A graphic of several surveyed tornado paths in Tennessee on April 7, 2006

Meteorological history
- Duration: April 6–8, 2006

Tornado outbreak
- Tornadoes: 73 confirmed
- Max. rating: F3 tornado
- Duration: 2 days, 2 hours, 6 minutes

Overall effects
- Fatalities: 10
- Injuries: 157
- Damage: $650 million (2006 USD)
- Areas affected: Central and Southern United States
- Part of the Tornadoes of 2006

The tornado outbreak of April 6–8, 2006, was a major tornado outbreak in the central and parts of the southern United States that began on April 6, 2006, in the Great Plains and continued until April 8 in South Carolina, with most of the activity on April 7. The hardest-hit region was Middle Tennessee, where several strong tornadoes devastated entire neighborhoods and left ten people dead. Some of the worst damage took place in Gallatin, Tennessee, and other communities north of Nashville also sustained significant damage.

There were 73 tornadoes confirmed across 13 states, with the bulk of them coming on the afternoon and evening of April 7 across the South, particularly in Tennessee. In total, 10 deaths were reported as a result of the tornadoes, and over $650 million in damage was reported, of which over $630 million was in Middle Tennessee. It was the third major outbreak of 2006, occurring just days after the Tornado outbreak of April 2, 2006.

== Meteorological synopsis ==
The outbreak was caused by a powerful low pressure system over the Midwest that produced a powerful cold front, which tracked eastward across the South and combined with warm air from the Gulf of Mexico to form severe thunderstorms; with activity concentrated on April 7.

The National Weather Service's Storm Prediction Center issued a high risk for severe weather for both April 6 and 7, forecasting favorable conditions for an extremely strong tornado outbreak on both days. The High Risk in effect for April 7 was first introduced in the 1730 UTC Day 2 Outlook on April 6, making it the first of only three days for which a Day 2 High Risk has been issued (subsequently occurring for April 14, 2012 and March 15, 2025).

However, activity was not as intense as expected on April 6; only 12 tornadoes were confirmed, most of which were in Kansas. Several were damaging, but only a few injuries and no deaths were reported. The reason for the relatively modest level of activity was due to a more stable than expected air mass that day over the region, with lower dew points and less wind shear, despite the absence of a cap (which would have otherwise allowed a much larger outbreak).

Conditions changed the next day in the South as the system moved eastward, with the cold front entering a more conducive environment. The increased wind shear, combined with the high temperatures and humidity levels, produced tornadoes beginning late that morning and continuing throughout the day into the overnight hours. At 2000z, the NWS issued the highest risk possible for tornadoes, as well as the only time it has ever been issued, a 60% risk. By the day's end, a total of 48 tornadoes developed. Several of them caused significant damage and loss of life. The worst tornadoes hit Middle Tennessee, where 10 people died. In addition to the tornadoes, there were reports of hail as large as softballs, powerful microbursts and straight-line winds, and local flooding. Extensive damage was also reported in the northern suburbs of Atlanta, Georgia, when storms developed there overnight into the early morning of April 8.

Despite a lower risk of activity on April 8, severe weather continued in Alabama, South Carolina, and Georgia — mostly in the early morning hours, with another 13 tornadoes reported before the outbreak finally ended as the system moved offshore into the Atlantic Ocean.

Over the three-day period, 73 tornadoes were confirmed, though the high number of overall tornadoes disguises the fact that most were weak F0 or F1 tornadoes.

== Confirmed tornadoes ==
Confirmed tornadoes by Fujita rating
FU	F0	F1	F2	F3	F4	F5	Total
0	41	25	5	2	0	0	73

=== April 6 event ===
List of reported tornadoes - Thursday, April 6, 2006
F#	Location	County / Parish	Coord.	Time (UTC)	Path length	Comments/Damage
Oklahoma
F0	SW of Pawhuska	Osage		2049	unknown	Brief touchdown in the Osage Nation. No damage was reported.
F1	NW of Welch To S of Faulkner, KS	Craig, Labette (KS), Cherokee (KS)		0005	12 miles (19 km)	In Oklahoma, the tornado severely damaged the roof of a mobile home, snapped trees, and blew down power lines. In Kansas, a mobile home was destroyed and the 2 other homes were damaged. 12 people were injured.
F0	N of Enterprise	Haskell		0018	unknown	Tornado briefly observed on Eufaula Lake just west of the Eufaula Dam. No damage was reported.
Kansas
F1	SE of Bennington	Saline, Ottawa		2054	2.5 miles (4.0 km)	Tornado touched down in a rural area, destroying an outbuilding and knocking down power poles.
F1	SW of Manchester	Dickinson		2103	2.5 miles (4.0 km)	Tornado damaged or destroyed several outbuildings and flipped a mobile home on its side.
F0	E of Longford	Clay		2112	0.5 miles (0.80 km)	Damage limited to a few trees.
F0	NE of Longford	Clay		2114	0.5 miles (0.80 km)	Tornado damaged three outbuildings and downed a large tree.
F1	W of Clay Center to SW of Garfield Center	Clay		2140	9 miles (14 km)	Large half-mile wide tornado damaged numerous outbuildings, trees, roofs, and irrigation pivots along its path.
F2	N of Barnes to S of Odell, NE	Washington, Gage (NE)		2220	17 miles (27 km)	Near the beginning of the path in Kansas, one brick home had its roof torn off and some of the exterior walls knocked down. Four outbuildings were destroyed nearby. Further along the path, the tornado caused damage to one other home and five additional outbuildings as well as many trees. One home was completely destroyed just southeast of Hanover. Damage in Nebraska was limited to trees.
F1	N of Lawton to E of Asbury, MO	Cherokee, Jasper (MO)		0046	5 miles (8.0 km)	Tornado touched down near the Kansas state line and crossed into Missouri, where a few outbuildings were destroyed.
Nebraska
F0	S of Adams	Gage		2300	6 miles (9.7 km)	Tornado tore the roofs off of three hog barns and a chicken shed, and blew out windows at several houses. Trees were damaged as well.
Arkansas
F0	SW of Marble Falls	Newton		0255	1.7 miles (2.7 km)	A few trees were snapped off or uprooted.
Sources: SPC Storm Reports for 04/06, Omaha NWS office Tulsa office Wichita office Topeka office, Little Rock office, Springfield office, National Climatic Data Center

=== April 7 event ===
List of reported tornadoes - Friday, April 7, 2006
F#	Location	County / Parish	Coord.	Time (UTC)	Path length	Comments/Damage
Tennessee
F0	SW of Big Sandy	Benton		1740	1.1 miles (1.8 km)	Homes sustained shingle damage in the Cedar Lake Estates subdivision, and several trees were downed.
F0	NW of Waverly	Humphreys		1805	0.2 miles (320 m)	Two houses suffered roof damage and several trees were downed.
F0	NE of Waverly	Humphreys		1810	0.2 miles (320 m)	Several outbuildings were damaged and a barn was destroyed.
F3	NE of Charlotte to Ashland City	Dickson, Cheatham, Robertson		1830	19 miles (31 km)	Near Charlotte, the tornado destroyed three mobile homes, flipped vehicles, and downed many trees. As the tornado passed near Bellsburg, a poorly constructed house was swept away and scattered into a wooded area, with only the basement and garage remaining. A truck was blown into the basement of the home. A small grocery store was also destroyed in the area. In Dickson County, a total of 25 homes were destroyed, 8 homes had major damage, and 24 homes and businesses had moderate damage. In Cheatham County, one home was destroyed, 13 homes had major damage, and 9 homes, along with farms and businesses had moderate damage. In the town of Greenbrier, homes had shingles torn off and large trees were downed. Tornado struck Ashland City before dissipating, where many trees and a large communications tower were downed, and homes sustained roof damage.
F2	Parker Crossroads to E of Yuma	Henderson, Carroll		1834	9 miles (14 km)	Damage in Henderson County was limited to trees. In Carroll County, the tornado struck the town of Yuma, where 15 homes were destroyed and 29 homes were damaged. The Yuma Church of Christ sustained significant roof damage, and numerous trees and power lines were downed. 5 people were injured.
F1	Sardis	Henderson		1840	4 miles (6.4 km)	Many trees and power lines were downed, and headstones were knocked over at the Sardis Cemetery.
F2	S of Camden	Benton		1853	6 miles (9.7 km)	One home was destroyed, and 15 other homes and businesses had major damage. One home lost its entire roof, and other homes had roof damage. Numerous large trees were snapped, uprooted or blown down.
F1	W of Hurricane Mills	Humphreys		1905	4.5 miles (7.2 km)	Many large trees were downed, a brick home was heavily damaged, and a mobile home was completely destroyed with only the frame left. Another mobile home was shifted off of its foundation.
F3	Goodlettsville to Gallatin	Davidson, Sumner		1908	23 miles (37 km)	7 deaths - Tornado first struck Goodlettsville, where major damage occurred and some small homes were leveled. Some businesses in town were also destroyed, including the Metro Baptist Church. 21 homes were destroyed, 13 homes or businesses were heavily damaged, and 31 others sustained moderate damage in that area. The tornado then struck Hendersonville, where 80 homes were destroyed. The tornado then tore through Gallatin, where 700 homes were destroyed, along with several car dealerships and other businesses. Many vehicles were thrown and mangled, and the Volunteer State Community College was heavily damaged. All seven fatalities occurred in Gallatin, and some homes were swept away at that location (though damage surveyors determined that they were poorly built). 128 people were injured.
F0	NE of Hohenwald	Lewis		1943	0.3 miles (480 m)	A few trees were snapped.
F1	McMinnville area	Warren		2145	11 miles (18 km)	2 deaths - Shingles were torn off of roofs and large trees were downed. A barn was heavily damaged as well. The two fatalities occurred when a mobile home was destroyed.
F1	S of Crossville	Cumberland		2246	6.2 miles (10.0 km)	Four homes and two mobile homes were destroyed out of 181 homes that were damaged. Outbuildings and vehicles were damaged as well.
F0	Chestnut Ridge	Lincoln, Moore		2317	30 yards (27 m)	Damage was limited to trees.
F1	SW of McMinnville	Warren		2328	4 miles (6.4 km)	1 death - There was extensive damage to a barn, a cinder block building, and numerous trees. Several outbuildings were destroyed and a shed was turned onto its side. Homes in the Country Club subdivision sustained roof damage, and a fatality occurred in a mobile home.
F0	E of Mulberry	Lincoln		2330	200 yards (180 m)	Homes sustained minor roof and siding damage, and trees were downed.
F0	W of Vanntown	Lincoln		2330	200 yards (180 m)	A few trees were downed.
F0	Champ	Lincoln		0101	unknown	A pole barn was heavily damaged and trees were uprooted.
Kentucky
F2	Temple Hill to NE of Summer Shade	Barren, Metcalfe		2004	8.4 miles (13.5 km)	In the Temple Hill area, 15 to 20 homes were destroyed. Several other homes, barns, and outbuildings were heavily damaged. A large RV was flipped over, a large tractor was moved about five feet, and a horse trailer was thrown over 75 yards. Additional homes and barns were destroyed in Metcalfe County before the tornado dissipated. 4 people were injured.
F1	Moorman	Muhlenberg		2302	1.8 miles (2.9 km)	One home received damage due to a large tree falling onto the roof. The community baseball park was damaged, and a block building and some fencing was severely damaged.
Indiana
F1	Pikeville	Pike		2045	1 mile (1.6 km)	A mobile home was destroyed when it was picked up and thrown into a barn. A cow was killed when a combine was dropped onto it, and many trees were downed.
F1	NW of Decatur	Clark		2114	0.75 miles (1.21 km)	Several buildings suffered minor damage, including damage to doors and the roof of a barn. A garage was damaged, trees were uprooted, and a corn cob was thrown through a van window.
Louisiana
F0	Linville area	Union		2135	7 miles (11 km)	Large trees were downed, one of which fell onto a mobile home. A school and a home in town sustained major roof damage.
Mississippi
F0	W of Morgan City (1st tornado)	Leflore		2136	3 miles (4.8 km)	Tornado remained in open sunflower fields with no damage.
F0	SE of Greenville	Washington		2153	1 mile (1.6 km)	Weak tornado briefly touched down and damaged a mobile home and tore a portion of a roof off a storage building.
F0	SW of Ecru	Pontotoc		2156	6 miles (9.7 km)	One mobile home was damaged, along with numerous trees.
F0	NE of Isola	Humphreys		2243	unknown	Tornado remained over open fields with no damage.
F0	W of Morgan City (2nd tornado)	Leflore		2252	1 mile (1.6 km)	Second tornado in the area also remained in open fields with no damage.
F0	N of Houston	Chickasaw		0035	unknown	Damage limited to some trees near the Tombigbee National Forest.
F0	N of Indianola	Sunflower		0255	3 miles (4.8 km)	Numerous trees and power lines were knocked down.
Alabama
F0	NE of Cherokee	Colbert		2250	50 yards (46 m)	Tornado blew trees onto three homes.
F0	N of Florence	Lauderdale		2314	30 yards (27 m)	Two trees were blown down.
F1	Tuscumbia area	Colbert		2325	8 miles (13 km)	A gas station was heavily damaged, and a billboard was twisted. 8 homes sustained minor to moderate damage in town.
F1	Colbert Heights to Leighton	Colbert		2355	10 miles (16 km)	Two schools were damaged in Colbert Heights. A manufactured home was heavily damaged, along with a baseball field. The tornado caused minor tree damage before destroying a barn in Leighton and dissipating.
F1	E of Cairo	Limestone		0005	0.75 miles (1.21 km)	Tornado damaged 2 homes and downed 15 trees.
F0	Sulpher Springs	Madison		0045	150 yards (140 m)	A mobile home suffered heavy roof damage and insulation was tossed into some nearby trees.
F0	NW of Hazel Green	Madison, Lincoln (TN)		0048	2 miles (3.2 km)	One mobile home was damaged, one barn was destroyed, and a few trees were knocked down.
F0	NW of Hatton	Lawrence		0145	30 yards (27 m)	Brief touchdown uprooted two trees.
F1	N of Hamilton	Marion		0155	0.5 miles (0.80 km)	Numerous trees and power lines were downed, including some that crushed a vehicle. Homes sustained roof damage and the top of a barn was ripped off.
F0	Hodges	Franklin		0200	3 miles (4.8 km)	A few trees and power lines were knocked down.
F0	E of Mount Hope	Lawrence		0230	60 yards (55 m)	Minor tree damage occurred.
F1	Haleyville	Marion, Winston		0307	4.7 miles (7.6 km)	A hotel, a gas station, and an old textile mill were heavily damaged in town. Haleyville High School sustained damage to its roof and athletic fields. numerous trees and power lines were downed, one of which landed on a house and car.
F0	E of Moulton	Lawrence		0300	100 yards (91 m)	A barn was destroyed and some trees were uprooted.
F0	Danville area	Morgan, Lawrence		0316	1 mile (1.6 km)	Danville High School was damaged, along with 6 homes in town. 4 home outside of town sustained minor roof damage and two barns were destroyed.
F0	E of Decatur	Limestone		0324	30 yards (27 m)	Light tree damage occurred and a billboard was heavily damaged.
F0	N of Arab	Marshall		0415	unknown	Tornado heavily damaged a barn and a storage area.
F1	NE of Cullman	Cullman		0450	unknown	Two chicken houses were destroyed and another was damaged. Sheet metal was wrapped around trees. A shed was destroyed and a feed bin was toppled as well.
F0	E of Fort Payne	DeKalb		0544	unknown	A manufactured home had its windows knocked out and some of its vinyl siding torn off, and several trees also uprooted by the tornado.
Sources: SPC Storm Reports for 04/07, Nashville office, Louisville office, Birmingham office, Memphis office, Northern Indiana office, Shreveport office, Huntsville office, Paducah office, National Climatic Data Center

=== April 8 event ===
List of reported tornadoes - Saturday, April 8, 2006
F#	Location	County / Parish	Coord.	Time (UTC)	Path length	Comments/Damage
Alabama
F1	Gardendale	Jefferson		0616	2.4 miles (3.9 km)	A few dozen businesses were heavily damaged. The damage included significant roof damage, broken windows, large bay doors blown out, air conditioning unit damage and sign damage. Three very large air conditioning units were blown off the roof of a K-Mart. These units were estimated at 5 to 8 thousand pounds each. A church along US Highway 31 suffered roof damage. Dozens of homes were damaged and numerous trees were blown down. One woman was injured when a tree fell through the roof of her home.
F1	Roebuck	Jefferson		0623	3.2 miles (5.1 km)	Hundreds of large hardwood trees were either blown over or uprooted. Numerous pine trees were also snapped off along the path. Several of the fallen trees landed on homes and produced substantial damage. An estimated 50 to 100 homes suffered varying degrees of damage.
F1	S of Ohatchee	Calhoun		0652	0.75 miles (1.21 km)	Several trees were downed, one of which landed on a home. Some small outbuildings were damaged as well.
F0	NW of Childersburg	Talladega		0803	0.6 miles (0.97 km)	Many trees were either snapped off or uprooted along the path. A few of the fallen trees landed on homes and automobiles.
Georgia
F0	S of Cedartown	Polk		0720	5 miles (8.0 km)	Trees and power lines were downed, some of which landed on structures. Some outbuildings were damaged, and porches were blown off of two homes. One person was injured.
F2	Rockmart area	Polk		0730	3 miles (4.8 km)	Many homes were damaged, and few were destroyed. 60 outbuildings were damaged or destroyed, and Rockmart High School was also heavily damaged. 5 coal cars were blown off of the tracks, and one person was injured.
F0	W of Marietta	Cobb		0750	2.5 miles (4.0 km)	Homes were damaged, along with numerous trees, some of which fell and landed on structures. Some shopping centers were damaged, and several wooden play-sets were tossed around.
F1	Noonday to Alpharetta	Cobb, Fulton		0755	18 miles (29 km)	Major damage occurred in suburban areas. In Cobb County, 13 residences were destroyed, 75 residences had major damage, 57 residences had minor damage and 38 residences were affected. 1 commercial property was destroyed, 10 commercial property had major damage, and 16 commercial properties had minor damage. In Fulton County, considerable damage was noted just south of Crabapple where a car wash and detail shop were destroyed, a gas station suffered major damage, and a nearby strip mall suffered minor damage. A dental building in Alpharetta sustained major damage, and 149 homes were damaged in the county. Hundreds of trees were downed along the path.
F0	NW of Five Points	Banks		0909	unknown	A chicken house was destroyed, and another was shifted from its foundation.
South Carolina
F1	S of Adams Run	Charleston		1953	2.5 miles (4.0 km)	Numerous trees, large limbs, and power lines were damaged along the path and one house partially collapsed due to the tornado.
F0	Charleston	Charleston		2020	2.5 miles (4.0 km)	Tornado downed trees and tossed a trailer deck 30 feet. Wind measuring equipment was destroyed, a gas station was damaged, and picnic tables were tossed around.
F0	Daniel Island	Berkeley		2023	unknown	The tornado broke out the door of a business and uprooted several trees along the path. Two large banners were severely damaged, two heavy duty tents were toppled, a metal support beam for one of the tents was snapped. A panel of the tennis scoreboard was damaged, and a temporary light display fell onto a vehicle at the Family Circle Tennis Center.
F0	Charleston to Daniel Island	Charleston, Berkeley		2025	300 yards (270 m)	The tornado blew out windows and caused minor structural damage to several businesses, and knocked down several large trees in the Charleston area. Damage was limited to trees at Daniel Island.
Sources: SPC Storm Reports for 04/08, Peachtree City office, Birmingham office, National Climatic Data Center

== Aftermath ==
On the night after the tornado hit Gallatin, there were many reports of looting in the devastated community. A nightly curfew was required to combat the looting and maintain order in the community. There were a total of 23 arrests made. The United States National Guard was called in after the tornado hit to help with security and the removal of the excessive debris. It took 10 days for Volunteer State Community College to re-open after the tornado hit.

The City of Hendersonville did not have tornado sirens at the time of the tornado, but the city installed some soon after the storm.

On September 26, the Greater Nashville Regional Council awarded the authorities involved in the recovery (including the municipalities of Sumner County) the Marshall S. Stuart Memorial Award for outstanding intergovernmental cooperation after the tornado. The quick response by other local authorities, counties and cities was congratulated.

On October 8, an episode of Extreme Makeover: Home Edition featured a family from Hendersonville that had their home being rebuilt after it was destroyed by the tornado. However, insurance issues plus personal injuries held back the recovery for many, and some neighborhoods have been slow to recover. Nonetheless, many homes have been rebuilt in the area.

=== Images ===
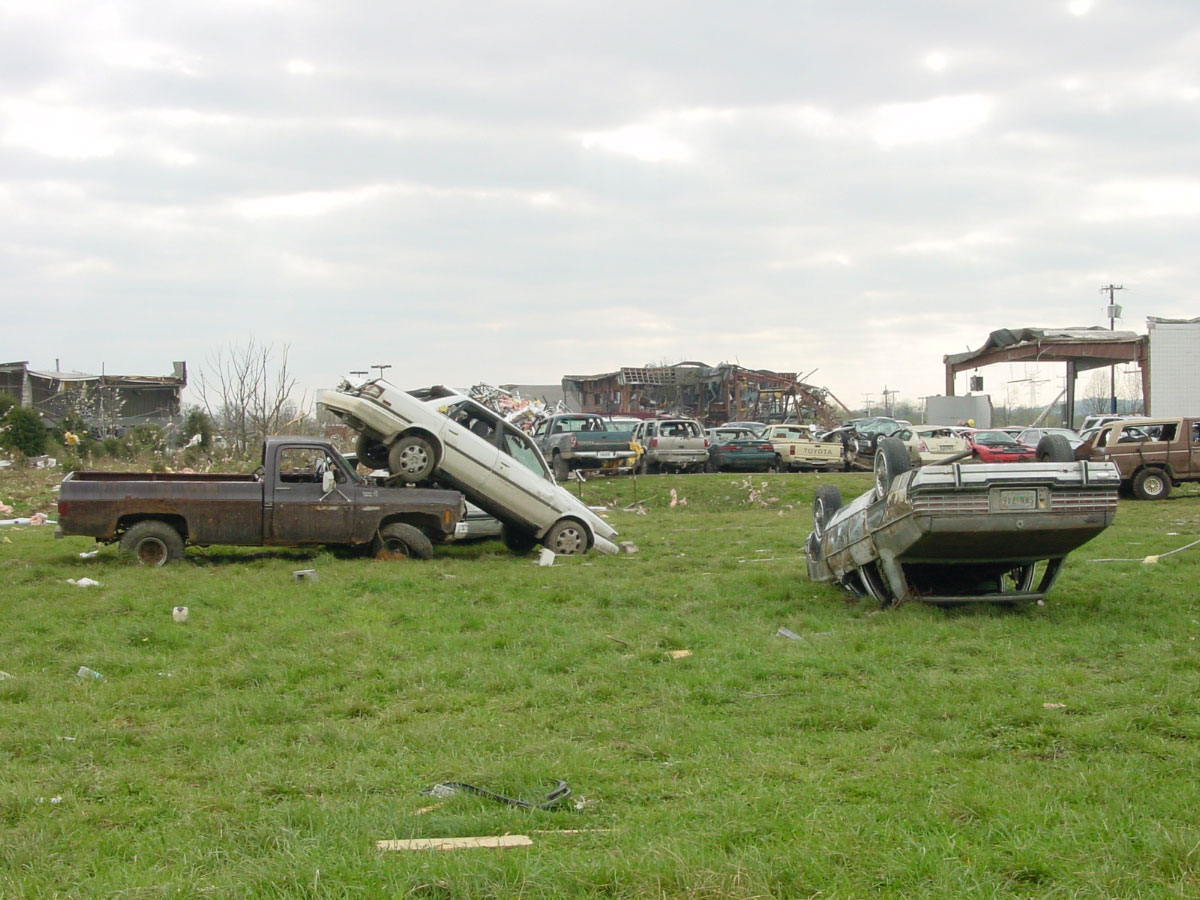
Damaged cars near Nashville Pike in Gallatin, Tennessee

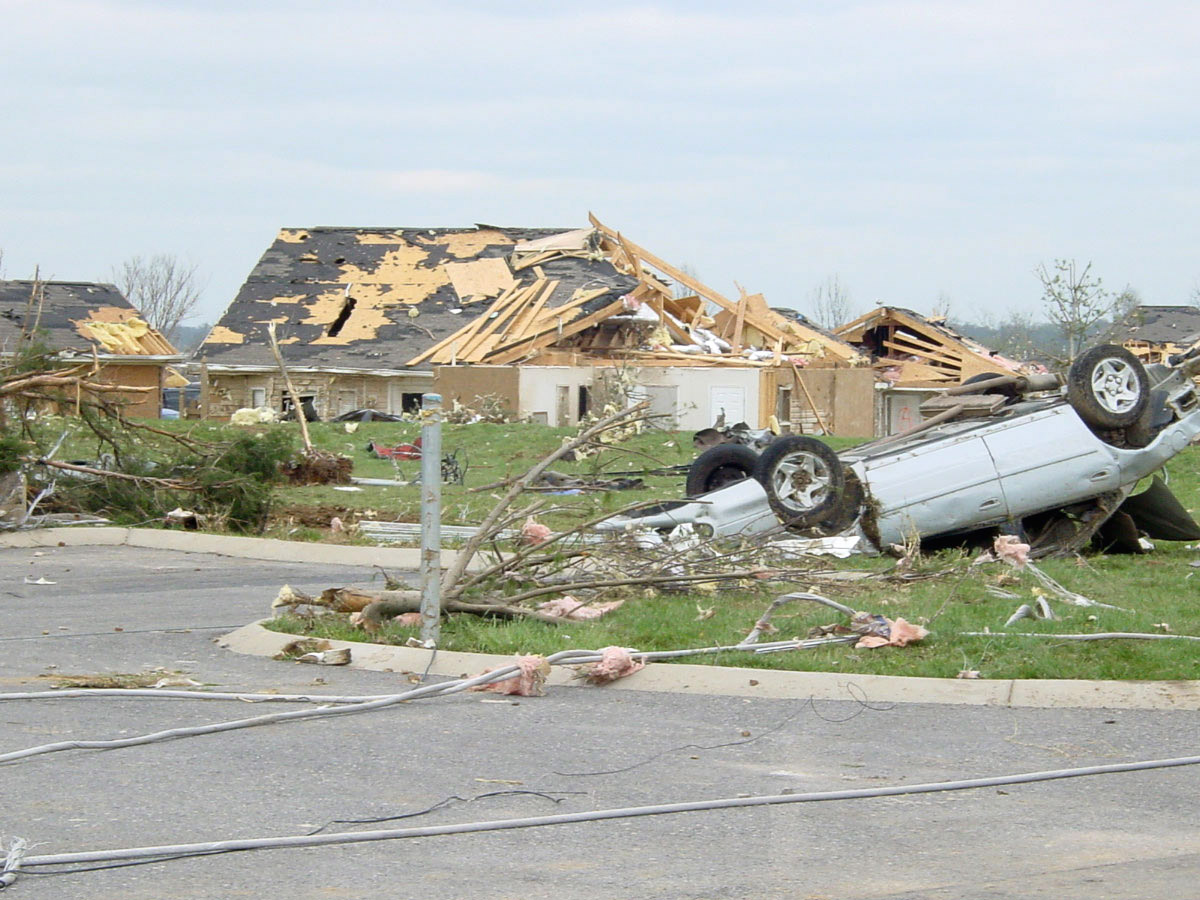
Residential damage in Gallatin, Tennessee

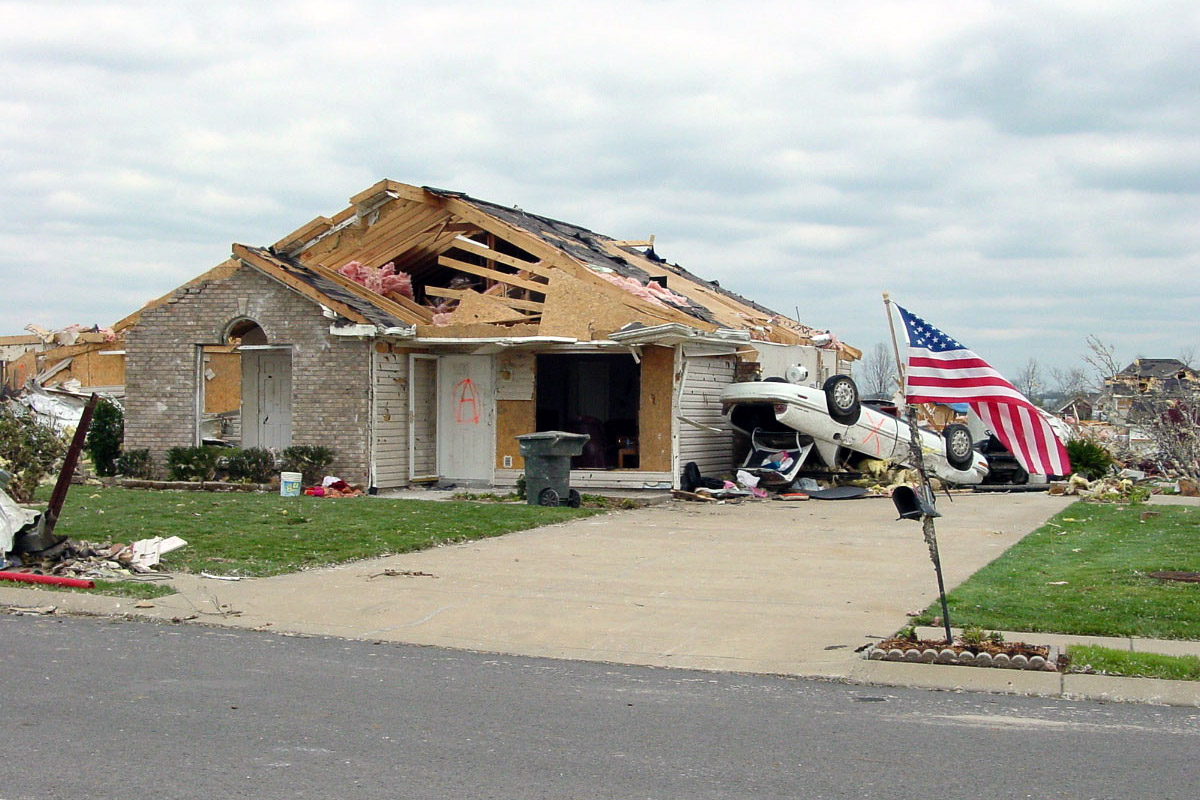
Residential damage in Gallatin, Tennessee

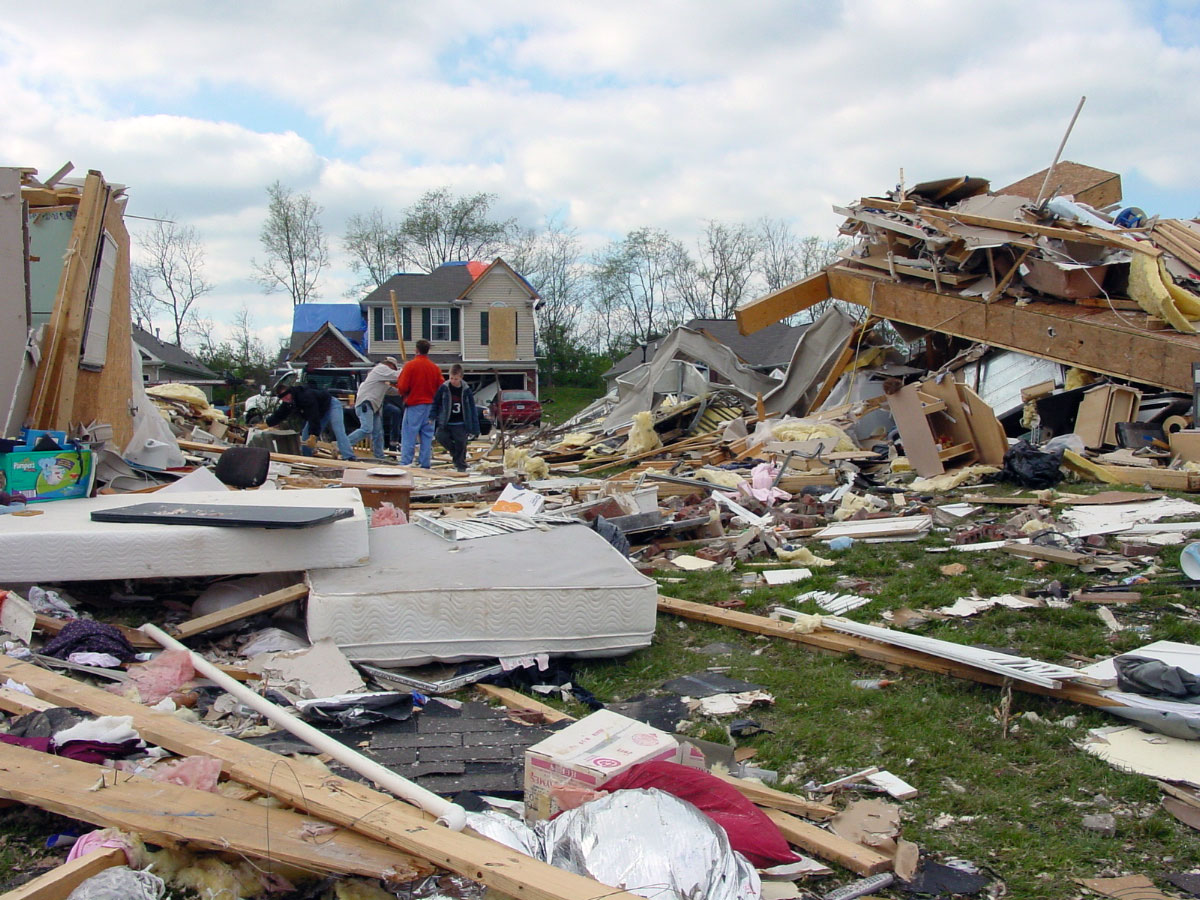
Residential damage in Gallatin, Tennessee

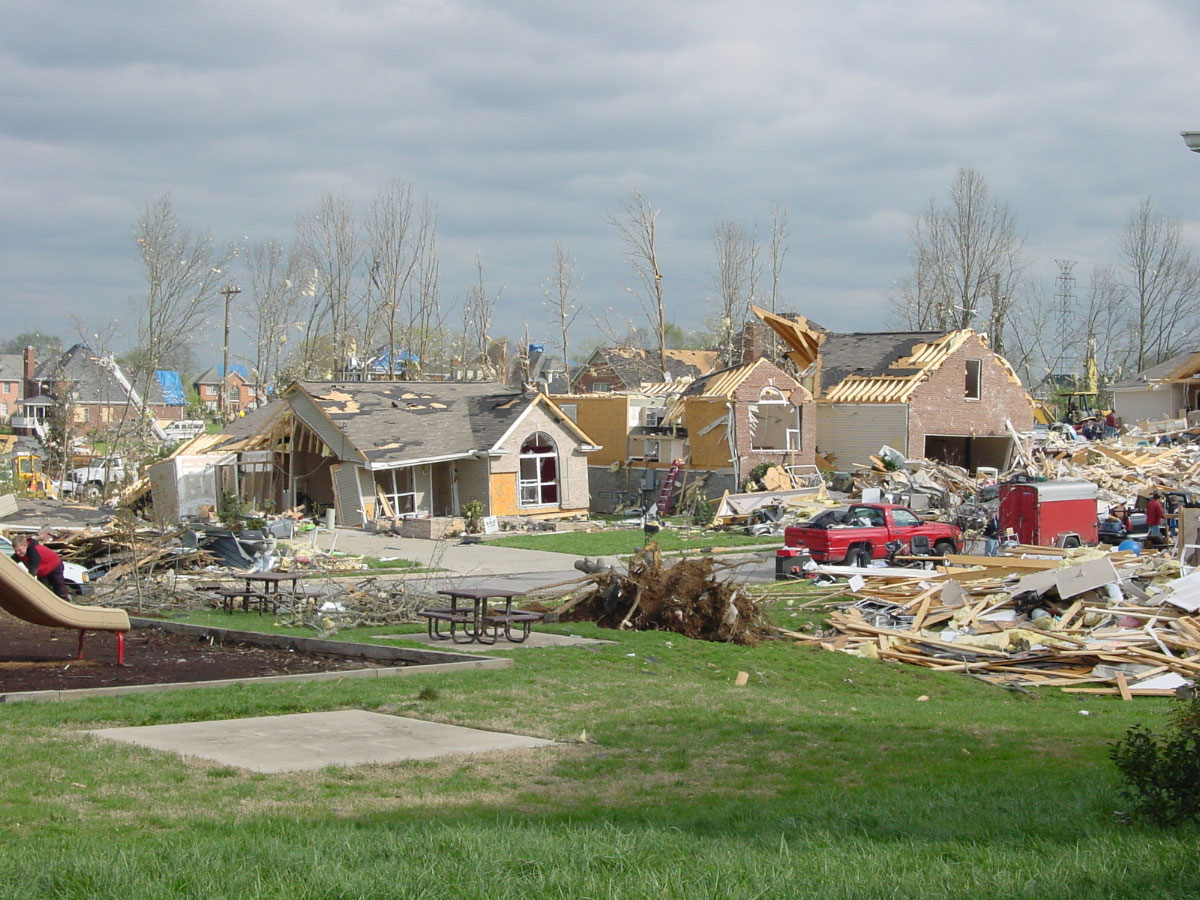
Residential damage in Gallatin, Tennessee

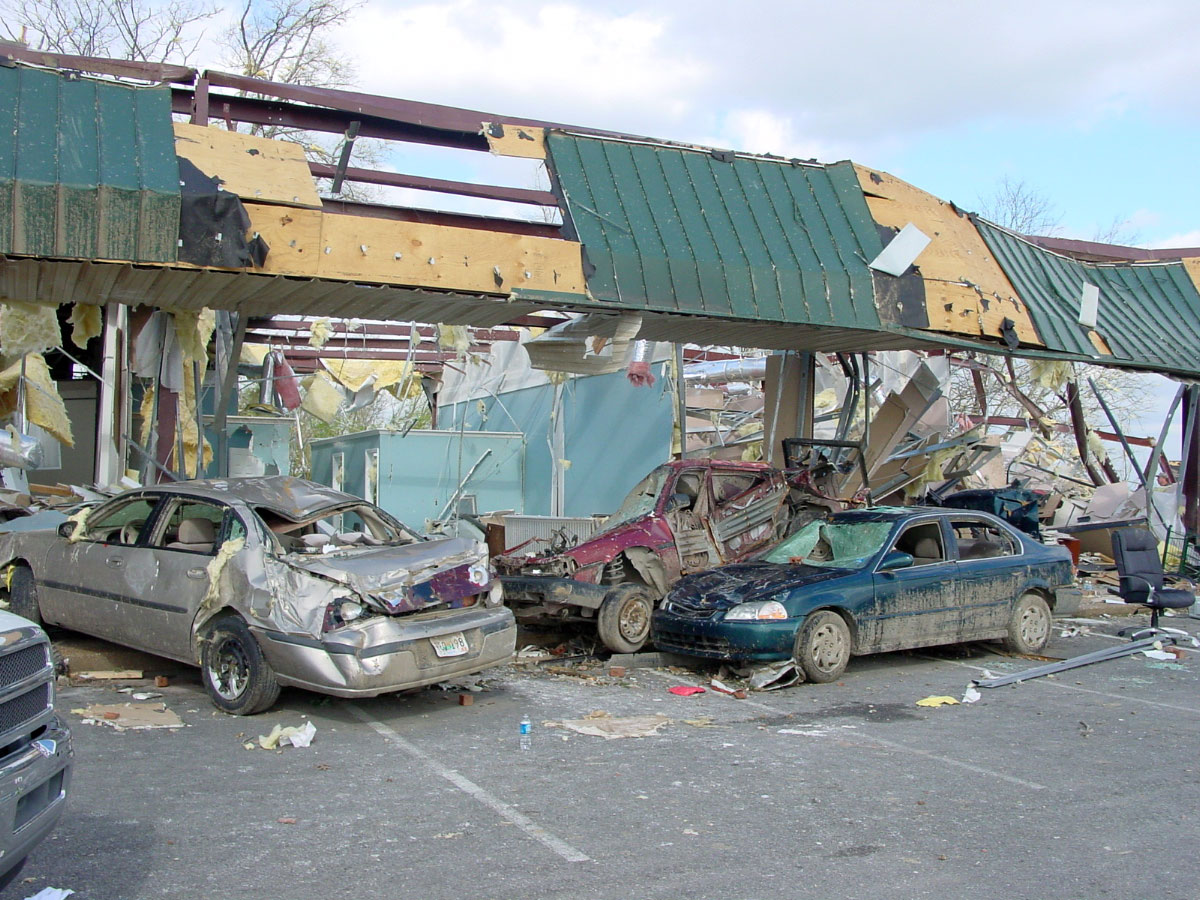
Damage to a storefront in Gallatin, Tennessee

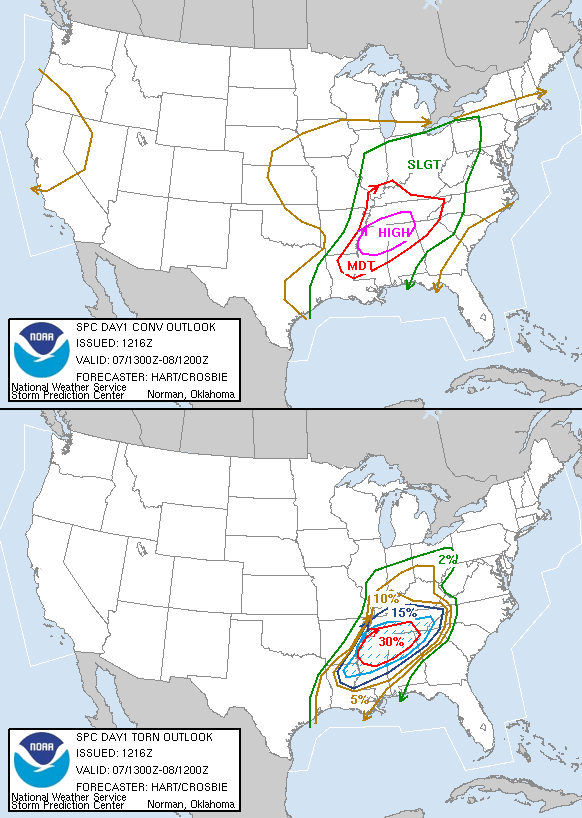
Probabilistic maps issued by the Storm Prediction Center during the heart of the outbreak.

== See also ==
- List of tornadoes and tornado outbreaks
- Tornadoes of 2006
