= WVCP =

Radio station at Volunteer State Community College in Gallatin, Tennessee

- Gallatin, Tennessee; United States
- Broadcast area: Nashville, Tennessee
- Frequency: 88.5 (MHz) (HD Radio)
- Branding: WVCP - FM 88.5

Programming
- Format: College radio
- Subchannels: HD2: Country Fresh Country

Ownership
- Owner: Volunteer State Community College

History
- First air date: January 4, 1979; 47 years ago
- Call sign meaning: Vol State College Pioneers

Technical information
- Licensing authority: FCC
- Facility ID: 70470
- Class: A
- ERP: 1000 watts
- HAAT: 67 meters (220 ft)
- Transmitter coordinates: 36°24′15.00″N 86°27′1.00″W

Links
- Public license information: Public file; LMS
- Website: wvcp.net

WVCP is the college radio station of Volunteer State Community College ("Vol State") in Gallatin, Tennessee, broadcasting at 88.5 MHz on the FM dial. It falls under the oversight of the Department of Communication and is managed by Marconi-winning faculty member Dianna Kelly Monk. Students and volunteers make up the airstaff. The station plays a mix of classic hits, ranging from the mid 1960s to early 2000s.

== Storm damage ==
Its studios on the second floor of Noble Caudill Hall were directly in the path of a large tornado that struck the college and killed nine people across the city of Gallatin on April 7, 2006, during the April 6–8, 2006 Tornado Outbreak. Part of the building collapsed, and WVCP's studios were a near-total loss. Equipment that was not destroyed by the storm sustained heavy water damage.

The station was knocked off the air the moment the storm struck, but returned to the air on April 13, 2006, in a limited capacity. The station is currently automating from a computer located at the transmitter site. During the Spring 2007 semester, WVCP again began operating at full capacity from a newly constructed studio in the Ramer Administration Building.

A few years earlier, strong straight-line winds caused the station's tower north of Gallatin to topple, forcing WVCP off the air for several weeks before the station relaunched on a new tower in a different location.

=== HD programming ===
WVCP broadcasts using HD radio technology.

- HD1 is a digital version of the analog signal broadcast on 88.5 MHz, while
- HD2 offers a fresh country format, with country hits less than five years old, all researched by students. The station is also working more closely with the college's recording program to air music projects played, recorded, and produced by students of the college, and airs a weekly show featuring fresh, locally-produced country music. The HD2 channel is also streamed online.

== See also ==
- List of Nashville media
