= Oklahoma State Highway 71 =

State highway in Oklahoma, United States

State Highway 71

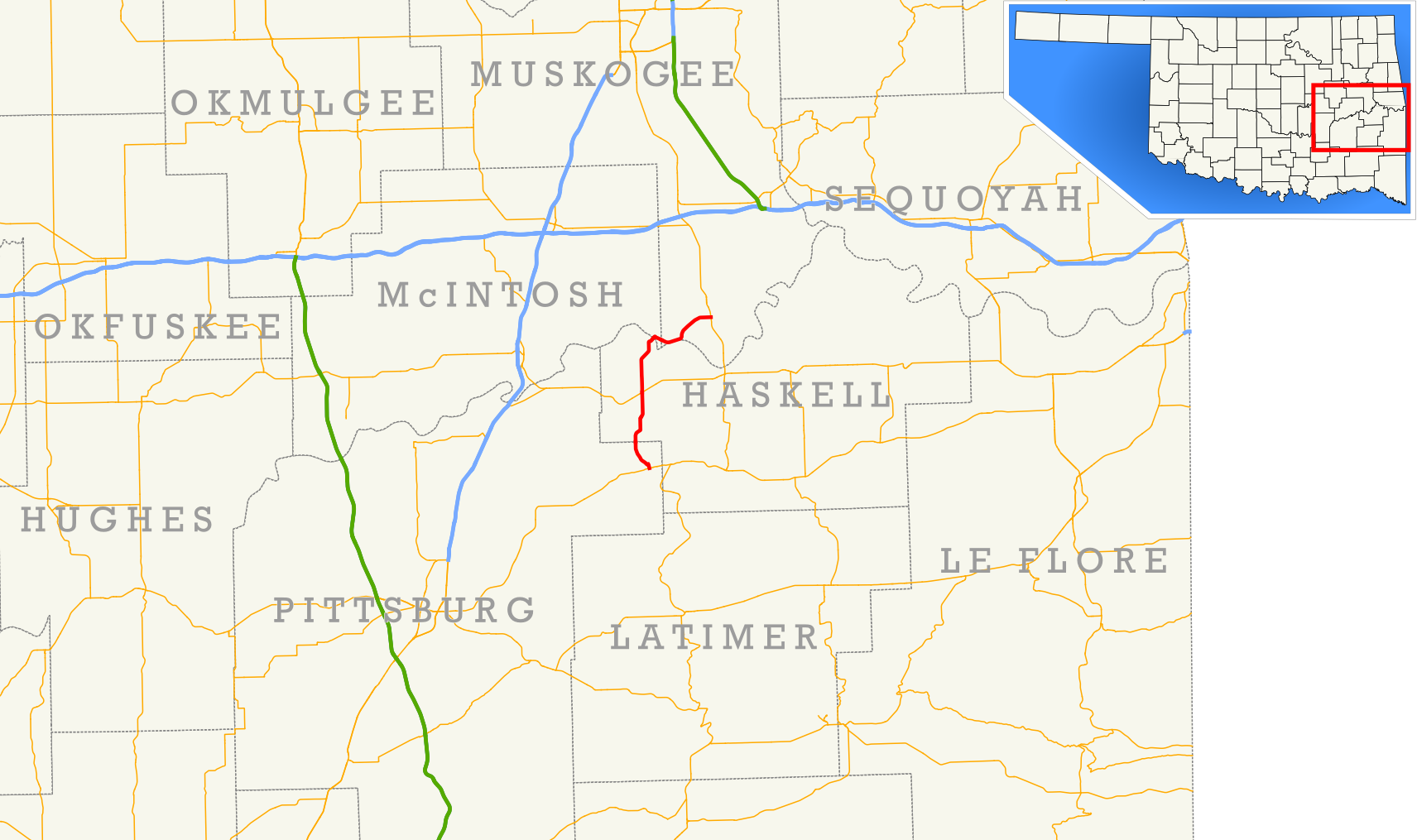

Route information
- Maintained by ODOT
- Length: 20.92 mi (33.67 km)

Major junctions
- South end: SH-31 in Quinton
- SH-9 in Enterprise
- North end: SH-2 south of Porum

Location
- Country: United States
- State: Oklahoma

Highway system
- Oklahoma State Highway System; Interstate; US; State; Turnpikes
← US 70	→ SH-72

State Highway 71 (abbreviated as SH-71 or OK-71) is a state highway in eastern Oklahoma. It runs from State Highway 31 in Quinton north to intersect State Highway 9 near Enterprise. It then continues north to Lake Eufaula Dam, and then turns east to end at State Highway 2. It has no lettered spur routes.

== Route description ==
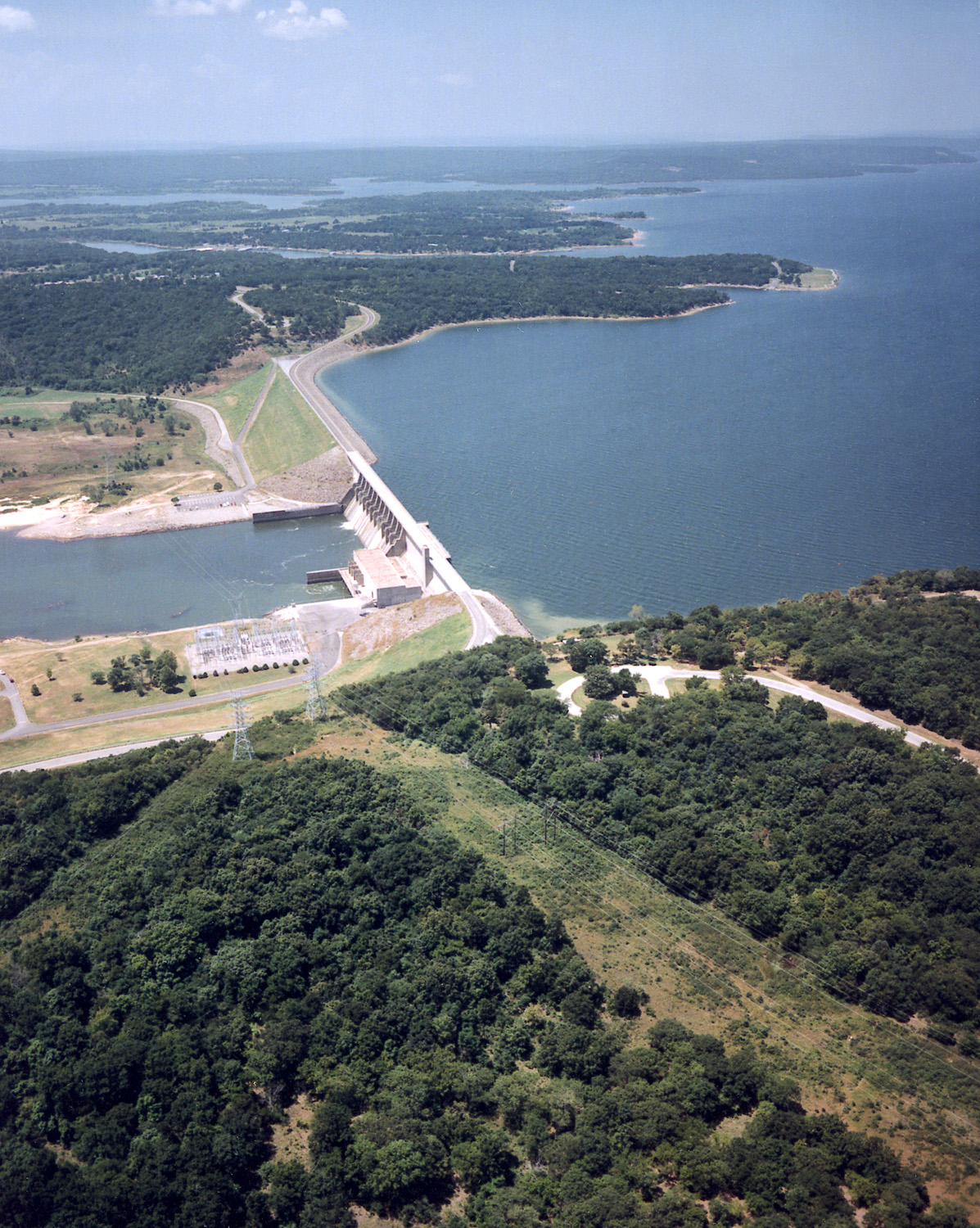
SH-71 runs across the top of the dam impounding Lake Eufaula.

State Highway 71 begins at SH-31 on the west side of Quinton in northeast Pittsburg County. The highway initially follows the Quinton street grid, which takes it in a north-northwest direction. As the grid peters out on the outskirts of town, SH-71 breaks away to the west and then to the northwest to avoid Beaver Mountain, gradually curving around to a northerly heading as it approaches the county line. The route crosses into Haskell County about three miles north of Quinton.

The road continues north in Haskell County until it veers northeast and crosses Longtown Creek. The road then turns back north, passing through rural parts of the county. SH-71 intersects SH-9 in the unincorporated community of Enterprise, just over five miles (8 km) north of the Pittsburg–Haskell county line. North of Enterprise, SH-71 parallels Brooken Creek until it drains into Lake Eufaula. The highway serves the boat docks and campgrounds on the east side of the lake, which is the largest entirely within Oklahoma. SH-71 then runs across the dam impounding the lake, bringing it into McIntosh County.

SH-71 merely cuts across the southeast corner of McIntosh County; the highway spends only 1.01 miles (1.63 km) within its boundaries. It soon enters Muskogee County, now on an eastbound trajectory. The road runs through the Canadian River valley, staying between the river and Hi Early Mountain. The route next turns northeast, away from the river but still skirting the mountain's base. It finally comes to an end at SH-2 about 1.5 miles (2.4 km) south of Porum.

== Junction list ==
County	Location	mi	km	Destinations	Notes
Pittsburg	Quinton	0.00	0.00	SH-31	Southern terminus
Haskell	Enterprise	8.24	13.26	SH-9	
McIntosh	No major junctions				
Muskogee		20.92	33.67	SH-2	Northern terminus
1.000 mi = 1.609 km; 1.000 km = 0.621 mi
