= Enterprise, Oklahoma =

- Census-designated place
- Location within Oklahoma Location within the United States
- Coordinates: 35°13′32″N 95°22′15″W
- Country: United States
- State: Oklahoma
- County: Haskell

Area
  - Total: 1.26 sq mi (3.27 km^{2})
  - Land: 1.26 sq mi (3.27 km^{2})
  - Water: 0 sq mi (0.00 km^{2})
- Elevation: 732 ft (223 m)

Population (2020)
  - Total: 170
  - Density: 134.6/sq mi (51.96/km^{2})
- Time zone: UTC-6 (Central (CST))
  - Summer (DST): UTC-5 (CDT)
- ZIP Code: 74561 (Quinton)
- Area codes: 918/539
- FIPS code: 40-24050
- GNIS feature ID: 2629917

Enterprise is an unincorporated community and census-designated place (CDP) in Haskell County, Oklahoma, United States. It was first listed as a CDP following the 2010 census. As of the 2020 census, Enterprise had a population of 170.

The CDP is in western Haskell County. State highways 9 and 71 intersect in the northern part of the community. Highway 9 leads east 8 miles (13 km) to Whitefield and west 14 miles (23 km) to Eufaula, while Highway 71 leads northeast across Eufaula Dam 14 miles (23 km) to Porum and south 8 miles (13 km) to Quinton.

Enterprise is in the valley of Brooken Creek, which flows north to the Canadian River just upstream of Eufaula Dam.

== Demographics ==
Historical population
Census	Pop.	Note	%±
2020	170		—
U.S. Decennial Census

=== 2020 census ===
As of the 2020 census, Enterprise had a population of 170. The median age was 43.0 years. 30.0% of residents were under the age of 18 and 27.6% of residents were 65 years of age or older. For every 100 females there were 97.7 males, and for every 100 females age 18 and over there were 95.1 males age 18 and over.

0.0% of residents lived in urban areas, while 100.0% lived in rural areas.

There were 57 households in Enterprise, of which 29.8% had children under the age of 18 living in them. Of all households, 49.1% were married-couple households, 8.8% were households with a male householder and no spouse or partner present, and 35.1% were households with a female householder and no spouse or partner present. About 33.3% of all households were made up of individuals and 29.8% had someone living alone who was 65 years of age or older.

There were 66 housing units, of which 13.6% were vacant. The homeowner vacancy rate was 0.0% and the rental vacancy rate was 66.7%.

Racial composition as of the 2020 census
Race	Number	Percent
White	98	57.6%
Black or African American	1	0.6%
American Indian and Alaska Native	54	31.8%
Asian	0	0.0%
Native Hawaiian and Other Pacific Islander	0	0.0%
Some other race	2	1.2%
Two or more races	15	8.8%
Hispanic or Latino (of any race)	4	2.4%

== Notable person ==
- Footsie Blair, (1900–1982) – was a Major League Baseball second baseman for the Chicago Cubs.
