= Volunteer State =

Volunteer State may refer to:

- Tennessee, whose state nickname is "the Volunteer State"
- Volunteer State Community College, a community college in Gallatin, Tennessee

== See also ==
- Tennessee Volunteers, the varsity intercollegiate athletics programs of the University of Tennessee
