= Lena Terrell Jackson =

American educator

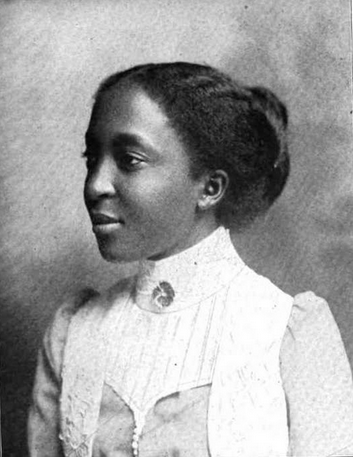
Lena Terrell Jackson, from a 1902 publication.

Lena Terrell Jackson (December 25, 1865 – September 4, 1943) was an American educator. She taught Latin to African-American students in Nashville, Tennessee for over fifty years.

== Early life ==
Lena Terrell Jackson was born in Gallatin, Tennessee, and raised by her mother Louise Jackson. She attended Fisk University, graduating in the class of 1885. She earned a master's degree, and had teaching certificates allowing her to teach Latin, German and French.

== Career ==
Jackson taught Latin in segregated Nashville, Tennessee schools for over fifty years, from 1886 at Nashville's first black high school, Meigs High School, until her retirement from Pearl Senior High School in 1942.

She wrote of her career, "I have devoted my life to endeavor to uplift my race by teaching and instructing children, realizing that by helping promote the cause of education among the colored race and the developing of the mind, the great questions that are before my people can more easily and properly be met."

She also invested in real estate, funded scholarships, and wrote essays on African-American life. She was active in the Fisk University Alumni Association, serving as an officer and on several committees. She was also active in the Pearl High School Parent-Teacher Association, and an officer in the Ladies' Aid Society of Howard Congregational Church in Nashville.

== Personal life ==
Lena Terrell Jackson died in 1943, aged 77 years. Her former students named a chapter of the National Honor Society for her. "She was a small woman with a big reputation," declared one reporter at the time of Pearl High School's centennial in 1998.
