= The Gallatin News Examiner =

American newspaper

Gallatin News-Examiner
- Owner: USA Today Co.
- Founder: Colonel Thomas Boyer
- Publisher: The Tennessean / Gannett
- Editor: Amy Nixon
- Founded: 1859
- Headquarters: 1 Examiner Court, Gallatin, TN 37066
- City: Gallatin, Tennessee
- Country: US
- OCLC number: 32693140
- Website: tennessean.com

The Gallatin News Examiner is an American newspaper published in Gallatin, Tennessee. It is now owned by the media company USA Today Co. and is published as part of the Tennessean newspaper. Gallatin News Examiner was published daily online and in print on Fridays until 2017; now Sumner/Gallatin stories are published through the Tennessean's website and twice-weekly in print. The paper is a member of the Tennessee Press Association. Its editor was Mealand Ragland-Hudgins, who became editor of the paper in 2015. In 2017, Amy Nixon was named editor of the digital and social presence of the Gallatin News Examiner.

== History ==
Colonel Thomas Boyers established the Gallatin Examiner in August 1859. Col. Boyers went on to become the first (organizing) president of the Tennessee Press Association. After serving in the Civil War, Col. Boyers returned to the Examiner and continued printing the paper until his death in 1895. In 2007, Col. Boyers was inducted into the Tennessee Newspaper Hall of Fame.

In 1905, the paper merged with the Tennessean (Gallatin, Tenn.) to form the Examiner and Tennessean. Thomas Boyers, Jr., his son, worked as a journalist and operated the paper until the 1930s. In the 1930s, the paper became the Gallatin Examiner and the Sumner County Tennessean

In 1998, Gannett paid a $1 million in a libel judgment stemming from an article published in the News Examiner in 1997. The article in the News Examiner suggested that a student at Gallatin High School, Garrett (“Bubba”) Dixon Jr., engaged in oral sex with donkeys and falsely attributed a related quote to the high school soccer coach. According to the Nashville Scene, "The suit was filed after a News-Examiner reporter—trying to amuse a buddy on the copy desk—inserted fictitious quotes attributed to Lassiter in a story about the Gallatin High soccer team. By accident, the quotes ended up published in the paper—including a made-up Lassiter remark that Dixon 'sucks donkey dicks' and suffers from 'sperm breath.'" Dixon Jr. was awarded $800,000 in damages, and the high school soccer coach received $150,000 in damages. The mistake was deemed by Deadspin as Sportswriting's Filthiest Fuck-Up.

Later in 1998, the News-Examiner was faced with accusations of plagiarism from a local television news program.

In 2014, former Tennessean publisher Craig Moon and former Scene editor Bruce Dobie attempted to buy Gannett's Tennessee-based dailies and weeklies, including the Gallatin News Examiner. Gannett rejected the $200 million bid.

In 2017, Gannett ceased the publication of the Gallatin News Examiner's local weekly. This move, along with staff layoffs, was part of Gannett's budget cuts at the paper.
