= Footsie Blair =

American baseball player (1900–1982)

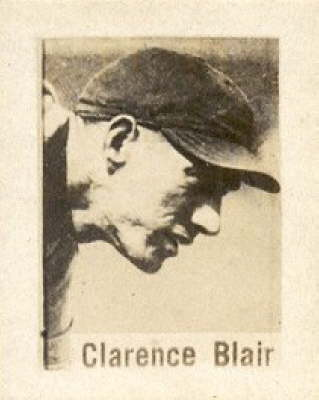
- Second baseman
- Born: July 13, 1900; Enterprise, Oklahoma, U.S.
- Died: July 1, 1982 (aged 81); Texarkana, Texas, U.S.
- Batted: Left Threw: Right

MLB debut
- April 28, 1929, for the Chicago Cubs

Last MLB appearance
- September 27, 1931, for the Chicago Cubs

MLB statistics
- Batting average: .273
- Home runs: 10
- Runs batted in: 96
- Stats at Baseball Reference

Teams
- Chicago Cubs (1929–1931)

Clarence Vick "Footsie" Blair (July 13, 1900 – July 1, 1982) was an American second baseman in Major League Baseball (MLB). He played three seasons in the majors, from 1929 to 1931, for the Chicago Cubs.

In a 246 game major league career, Blair posted a .273 batting average (243-for-890) with 138 runs, 10 home runs and 96 RBIs. Playing at first, second and third base, he recorded a .960 fielding percentage.
