= Gallatin, Tennessee =

County seat of Sumner County, Tennessee, United States

- City
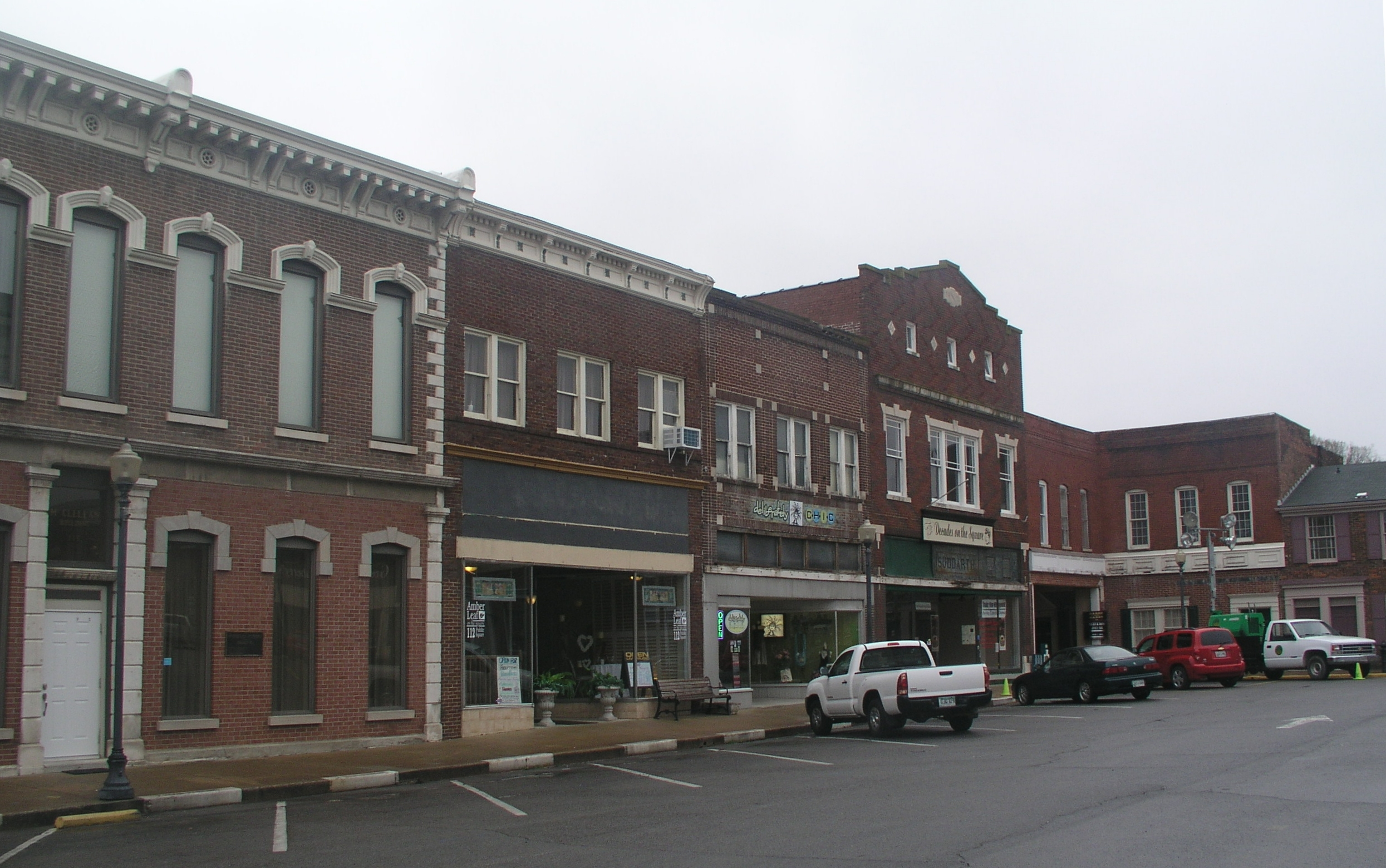
- Downtown Gallatin

- Flag Seal

- Location of Gallatin in Sumner County, Tennessee.

- Location of Gallatin in the US
- Coordinates: 36°23′18″N 86°26′48″W
- Country: United States
- State: Tennessee
- County: Sumner
- Districts: 3, 4, 5, 6, 7
- Established: February 25, 1802; 224 years ago
- Named for: Albert Gallatin

Government
  - Type: Mayor–Council
  - Mayor: Paige Brown (I)
  - Council: Gallatin City Council

Area
  - Total: 34.81 sq mi (90.16 km^{2})
  - Land: 34.27 sq mi (88.76 km^{2})
  - Water: 0.54 sq mi (1.40 km^{2})
- Elevation: 538 ft (164 m)

Population (2020)
  - Total: 44,431 ▲
  - Estimate (2024): 52,489 ▲
  - Density: 1,296.5/sq mi (500.59/km^{2})
- Time zone: UTC−6 (CST)
  - Summer (DST): UTC−5 (CDT)
- ZIP Code: 37066
- Area code: 615, 629
- FIPS code: 47-28540
- GNIS feature ID: 1285100
- Website: www.gallatintn.gov

Gallatin is a city in and the county seat of Sumner County, Tennessee, United States. The population was 44,431 at the 2020 census and is estimated to be 52,489 as of 2024. Named for United States Secretary of the Treasury Albert Gallatin, the city was established on the Cumberland River and made the county seat of Sumner County in 1802. It is located about 30.6 miles northeast of the state capital of Nashville, Tennessee.

Several national companies have facilities or headquarters in Gallatin, including Facebook, Gap, Inc., Beretta and Servpro Industries LLC. Gallatin was formerly the headquarters of Dot Records. The city is also the site of Volunteer State Community College, a two-year college with more than 70 degree programs. In 2017, Gallatin was ranked as "The Nicest Place In America" by Reader's Digest.

== History ==
Prior to Gallatin's official establishment, the area along Station Camp Creek was secured by early pioneers. In 1780, Captain William Asher established Asher's Station. This fortified stockade served as a vital defensive outpost and a voting hub under the Cumberland Compact. Gallatin was later established in 1802 as the permanent county seat of Sumner County, in what is called the Middle Tennessee region of the state. The town was named after Albert Gallatin, Secretary of Treasury to Presidents Thomas Jefferson and James Madison. Andrew Jackson became one of the first to purchase a lot when the town was surveyed and platted in 1803. The town was built around a traditional plan of an open square. Jackson founded the first general store in Gallatin.

In 1803, the first county courthouse and jail were built on the central town square. In 1815, the town was incorporated. In the mid-20th century, it operated under a charter established by a 1953 Private Act of the State Legislature.

=== American Civil War ===
During the secession crisis just before the Civil War, the citizens of Gallatin hoped to remain neutral; they were opposed to secession from the Union. Once the fighting began, however, they gave almost unanimous support to the Confederacy and volunteered to serve in defense of their state.

The Union Army captured Gallatin in February 1862, following Ulysses S. Grant's capture of Fort Donelson. Gallatin was strategic both because of the railroad, which ran east–west through the state, and its location on the Cumberland River, both of which the Union Army sought to control. In July 1862, General John Hunt Morgan recaptured Gallatin and held it until October, when the Confederate forces fell back to Chattanooga.

In November 1862, Union General Eleazer A. Paine retook the town, and Union troops occupied it throughout the remainder of the war and into 1867. Paine was notoriously cruel and was replaced in command before the end of the war because of his behavior. Alice Williamson, a local 16-year-old girl, kept a diary during 1864 and described Paine's execution of alleged spies without trial, some in the public square. Others were taken to the river and shot there. The long occupation, in which the troops lived off the land, disrupted civil society in the region.

Even before the Emancipation Proclamation in January 1863, many enslaved African Americans freed themselves by leaving farms and plantations with their families to join the Union troops in Gallatin and other parts of the state. The Army established a contraband camp here. The ex-slaves were provided food and housing, and put to work. In 1864, schools were set up in the camp to teach both children and adults to read and write.

In July 1863, some 200 local ex-slaves were among the first in the state to volunteer for the United States Colored Troops (USCT), enlisting at the Gallatin public square. They were assigned to the 13th Tennessee at Nashville. About two months later, a full regiment of 1,000 men, the 14th Tennessee USCT at Gallatin, was recruited from ex-slaves in Nashville, Gallatin and Murfreesboro.

Men from Gallatin were among those from the 12th and 13th TN Infantry USCT who built a rail line through nearby Waverly and the earthen Fort Hill near that town for regional defense.

The long enemy occupation drained the area of resources. Union troops confiscated livestock and crops from local farms. By the end of the war, widespread social and economic breakdown existed in the area, accompanied by a rise in crime. Occupation forces of the Union Army remained in Gallatin until 1870 after the war.

Through this period, many freedmen had moved from the farms into town, to gather in black communities away from white oversight. At the same time, many white residents moved from town out to farms to avoid the occupying troops. The area lost numerous men to the war and took years to recover. Its continued reliance on agriculture slowed the economy, and planters and other employers struggled with the shift to a free labor system.

=== Cholera, 1873 ===
In summer 1873, Gallatin was devastated by an epidemic of cholera, which was part of a pandemic that had started in India in 1865. It moved west into Europe, and finally was carried by passengers on ships across the Atlantic Ocean, the third such pandemic to reach the United States. In the Mississippi River system, it started with cases first recorded in New Orleans in February 1873. The disease spread upriver with travelers to ports along the Mississippi River and its tributaries. The poor sanitation of the period resulted in contamination of water sources, a primary means of disease transmission.

The first case in Gallatin was recorded on May 29, and the patient died. During June, 68 people died in the small town, including many children. By August, the disease had largely burned out. Overall, Sumner County had an estimated 120 deaths that year from cholera, with four-fifths of them suffered by African Americans. An 1874 congressional report said that cholera had been documented in 264 towns and 18 states.

Nashville had 603 fatal cases from June 7 to 29, with 72 people dying on the day of highest fatalities. In the United States, some 50,000 people died of cholera during this pandemic, including 4,000 in Saint Louis and 3,500 in New Orleans.

Gradually through the late 19th century, Gallatin and its surroundings regained some steady growth. The area was primarily agricultural until the middle of the 20th century.

=== Mid-20th century to present ===
By 1970, industrialization and urbanization had resulted in half the county population being considered urban (including suburbs). In 1992, Gallatin was surpassed by Hendersonville as the largest city in the county, though the former remains the county seat. Today, it serves in part as a bedroom commuter suburb to the larger city and state capital of Nashville, some 30 miles to the southwest.

On April 7, 2006, a tornado struck the city, killing seven people and injuring 128 others. Volunteer State Community College sustained major damage. This tornado was part of a massive tornado outbreak. On December 9, 2023, a significant tornado struck the city and caused devastating destruction.

== Geography ==
According to the United States Census Bureau, the city has a total area of 22.5 square miles (58 km^{2}), of which 22.0 square miles (57 km^{2}) are land and 0.5 square miles (1.3 km^{2}) (2.18%) is covered by water. Gallatin has variety of natural landscapes: open fields, forests, hills, and lakes. The city is located on Station Camp Creek, 3 mi (5 km) north of the Cumberland River, which was the chief route of transportation in the county's early years of settlement.

Old Hickory Lake, a man-made lake built by the U.S. Army Corps of Engineers as a result of a dam and lock on the Cumberland River, is located southwest of the city near Hendersonville.

Gallatin was on the path of the total solar eclipse of August 21, 2017. Totality of the eclipse, lasting 2 minutes, 38.7 seconds, occurred just before 1:30 PM local DST time (18:28:52.3 UTC)

=== Climate ===
High temperatures average 49 °F (9 °C) during the winter, 69 °F (21 °C) in spring, 88 °F (31 °C) in summer, and 72 °F (22 °C) in fall. The coolest month is January, and July is the warmest. The lowest recorded temperature was −20 °F (−29 °C) in 1985. The highest recorded temperature was 106 °F (41 °C) in 2007. The maximum average precipitation occurs in March.

== Demographics ==
Historical population
| Census | Pop. | Note | %± |
|---|---|---|---|
| 1870 | 2,123 | | — |
| 1880 | 1,938 | | −8.7% |
| 1890 | 2,078 | | 7.2% |
| 1900 | 2,409 | | 15.9% |
| 1910 | 2,399 | | −0.4% |
| 1920 | 2,757 | | 14.9% |
| 1930 | 3,050 | | 10.6% |
| 1940 | 4,829 | | 58.3% |
| 1950 | 5,107 | | 5.8% |
| 1960 | 7,901 | | 54.7% |
| 1970 | 13,253 | | 67.7% |
| 1980 | 17,191 | | 29.7% |
| 1990 | 18,794 | | 9.3% |
| 2000 | 23,230 | | 23.6% |
| 2010 | 30,278 | | 30.3% |
| 2020 | 44,431 | | 46.7% |
| 2025 (est.) | 54,590 | ▲ | 22.9% |

=== Racial and ethnic composition ===
Gallatin city, Tennessee – Racial and Ethnic Composition (NH = Non-Hispanic) Note: the US Census treats Hispanic/Latino as an ethnic category. This table excludes Latinos from the racial categories and assigns them to a separate category. Hispanics/Latinos may be of any race.
| Race / Ethnicity | Pop 2010 | Pop 2020 | % 2010 | % 2020 |
|---|---|---|---|---|
| White alone (NH) | 22,558 | 30,537 | 74.50% | 68.73% |
| Black or African American alone (NH) | 4,417 | 6,479 | 14.59% | 14.58% |
| Native American or Alaska Native alone (NH) | 72 | 113 | 0.24% | 0.25% |
| Asian alone (NH) | 224 | 749 | 0.74% | 1.69% |
| Pacific Islander alone (NH) | 27 | 27 | 0.09% | 0.06% |
| Some Other Race alone (NH) | 67 | 197 | 0.22% | 0.44% |
| Mixed Race/Multi-Racial (NH) | 479 | 1,923 | 1.58% | 4.33% |
| Hispanic or Latino (any race) | 2,434 | 4,406 | 8.04% | 9.92% |
| Total | 30,278 | 44,431 | 100.00% | 100.00% |

=== 2020 census ===
As of the 2020 census, Gallatin had a population of 44,431. The median age was 37.9 years; 23.4% of residents were under the age of 18 and 16.9% of residents were 65 years of age or older. For every 100 females there were 91.6 males, and for every 100 females age 18 and over there were 88.6 males age 18 and over.

97.9% of residents lived in urban areas, while 2.1% lived in rural areas.

There were 17,791 households in Gallatin, of which 31.8% had children under the age of 18 living in them. Of all households, 45.6% were married-couple households, 16.7% were households with a male householder and no spouse or partner present, and 31.2% were households with a female householder and no spouse or partner present. About 27.5% of all households were made up of individuals and 10.9% had someone living alone who was 65 years of age or older.

There were 19,201 housing units, of which 7.3% were vacant. The homeowner vacancy rate was 1.5% and the rental vacancy rate was 9.9%.

Racial composition as of the 2020 census
| Race | Number | Percent |
|---|---|---|
| White | 31,359 | 70.6% |
| Black or African American | 6,583 | 14.8% |
| American Indian and Alaska Native | 212 | 0.5% |
| Asian | 753 | 1.7% |
| Native Hawaiian and Other Pacific Islander | 30 | 0.1% |
| Some other race | 1,985 | 4.5% |
| Two or more races | 3,509 | 7.9% |
| Hispanic or Latino (of any race) | 4,406 | 9.9% |

=== 2010 census ===
At the 2010 United States census, there were 30,278 people, 11,871 households and 7,859 families residing in the city. The population density was 1,376.27 per square mile, and the housing unit density was 539.59 units per square mile. The racial makeup was 77.66% White, 14.67% Black or African American, 0.29% Native American, 0.76% Asian, 0.15% Pacific Islander, 4.38% from other races, and 2.08% from two or more races. Those of Hispanic or Latino origins were 8.04% of the population.

Of the 11,871 households, 29.23% had children under the age of 18 living in them, 45.96% were married couples living together, 4.52% had a male householder with no wife present, 15.73% had a female householder with no husband present, and 33.80% were not families; 27.19% of all households were made up of individuals, and 10.72% had someone living alone who was 65 years of age or older. The average household size was 2.48 and the average family size was 3.01.

Of the 30,278 residents, 24.21% were under the age of 18, 62.20% were between the ages of 18 and 64, and 13.59% were 65 years of age or older. The median age was 36.6 years; 51.00% of the residents were female and 48.00% were male.

The median household income was $43,770 and the median family income was $51,553. Males had a median income of $38,818 and females $32,997. The per capita income was $22,230. About 12.9% of families and 16.6% of the population were below the poverty line, including 24.8% of those under the age of 18 and 10.9% of those age 65 and over.

=== 2000 census ===
At the 2000 census, there were 23,230 people, 8,963 households and 6,193 families residing in the city. The population density was 1,057.3 inhabitants per square mile (408.2/km^{2}). The 9,600 housing units averaged 436.9 per square mile (168.7/km^{2}). The racial makeup was 78.30% White, 17.57% African American, 0.30% Native American, 0.42% Asian, 0.07% Pacific Islander, 2.02% from other races, and 1.32% from two or more races. Hispanics or Latinos of any race were 3.45% of the population.

Of the 8,963 households, 32.5% had children under the age of 18 living with them, 48.0% were married couples living together, 16.1% had a female householder with no husband present, and 30.9% were not families; 26.5% of all households were made up of individuals, and 11.0% had someone living alone who was 65 years of age or older. The average household size was 2.50 and the average family size was 2.99.

25.4% of the population were under the age of 18, 9.4% from 18 to 24, 29.6% from 25 to 44, 21.9% from 45 to 64, and 13.7% who were 65 years of age or older. The median age was 36 years. For every 100 females, there were 90.7 males. For every 100 females age 18 and over, there were 86.8 males.

The median household income was $34,69, and the median family income was $41,899. Males had a median income of $30,620 and females $22,696 for females. The per capita income was $18,550. About 10.8% of families and 14.4% of the population were below the poverty line, including 20.4% of those under age 18 and 13.3% of those age 65 or over.

== Economy ==
In March 2025, the unemployment rate in Sumner County was 2.8%, which was 1.4% below the national rate. The total number of workers in the county was more than 100,000 in 2023.

The top four major employers in Gallatin, in order, are GAP, Inc., Sumner Regional Medical Center, Volunteer State Community College, and RR Donnelley. Gap employs 1,250 workers The Tennessee Valley Authority operates a coal-fired power plant in Gallatin.

In 2015, the Italian firearms manufacturer Beretta moved its U.S. production facility to Gallatin from Accokeek, Maryland.

In 2024, tech giant Meta opened a new data center with more than 1.6 million square feet of space. The company claimed that their total investment in Gallatin through the data center amounted to more than $1.5 billion. However, nearby residents have complained of noise and other issues, such as flooding from water runoff, stemming from the data center. Consequently, as of November 2026, the city council is considering a moratorium on data center construction.

== Arts and culture ==
Gallatin has a modern 10-screen movie theater, NCG Gallatin Cinema. It has a completely restored single-screen theater, called The Palace, built in 1908. There is also a public city library.

Annual events include the Sumner County Fair, held during the last week of August, a Fall Festival held on the public square, and the Gallatin Christmas Parade.

The yearly Candlelight Cemetery Tour is held annually on the first Saturday in October. It is held in the city's old cemetery, located close to the town square. Actors and actresses depict various historical figures who lived in and around Gallatin during its 200 years of history — particularly those who lived before 1900 — from lawyers and doctors to business people to various persons of note in the community. Information on these individuals is gathered from various historical documents (legal papers, family journals, etc.). The event is sponsored by the Sumner County Historical Society in association with the local county museum (see below). Proceeds from the annual event go towards supporting the museum.

=== Museums and other points of interest ===
The Sumner County Museum in Gallatin houses a number of artifacts of historical significance to the city and the county.

The city has several architecturally significant buildings listed on the National Register of Historic Places and a central historic district. Restored homes that are open to the public include Cragfont, Rosemont and Trousdale Place.

== Parks and recreation ==
Parks
Gallatin has six parks that allow for various sports and activities, including: baseball, basketball, beach volleyball, disc golf, fishing, American football, horseshoes, skateboarding, soccer, softball, swimming, tennis, walking and volleyball. These parks are:

- Clearview Park
- Lock 4 Park
- Municipal Park
- Rogers Field
- Thompson Park
- Triple Creek Park

Old Hickory Lake is also available for boating, fishing, swimming and related activities.

Recreation
Gallatin offers Cal Ripken and Babe Ruth baseball for ages 5–15 with the Kiwanis Club and Little League Baseball with the American Legion. Slow-pitch girls' softball leagues are also present. Basketball, American football, tennis, and soccer leagues are also available for various ages.

The Gallatin Civic Center has a swimming pool, a running/walking track, racquetball court, and basketball courts.

Gallatin has three golf courses:

- Long Hollow Golf Club – a public, 18-hole course built in 1983
- Gallatin Country Club – a private, 9-hole course built in 1948
- The Club at Fairview – a private, 36-hole course built in 2004

Gallatin has one disc golf course:

- Triple Creek Disc Golf Course – a public, 18-hole course

Triple Creek is maintained by the City of Gallatin with assistance from the Sumner County Disc Golf Association (SCDGA). The SCDGA holds several events a month at Triple Creek DGC including Wednesdays Random Draw Doubles and a SCDGA Bag Tag that rotates between Triple Creek DGC and Sanders Ferry Park DGC.

== Government ==
Gallatin has a Mayor-Council government (Weak Mayor Form). The City Council is made up of seven elected officials: five are elected from single-member districts within the city limits, and two members are at-large. Of these seven council members, one is elected by members of the council as Vice-Mayor to serve a limited term. Meetings are presided over by the Mayor, who is elected at-large by voters of the city.

The City Recorder/City Judge is entrusted with two major functions: administering the city judicial system and maintaining vital city records, billing, and licensing services. These services include collecting city property taxes, ensuring liquor store compliance, and issuing taxi-cab and beer permits. City residents can pay utility bills, purchase city trash cans, apply for property tax rebates and city business licenses at the City Recorder/City Judge office.

The City Attorney oversees, prepares, reviews, and interprets ordinances, resolutions, and contracts; provides legal support to the Mayor, City Council, staff, boards and committees; and manages litigation in which the city may be involved. Periodic updating of the Gallatin Municipal Code, published by the Municipal Code Corporation, is coordinated by the City Attorney. The Municipal Code includes the City Charter, as well as other City ordinances which are permanent.

Current Mayor and City Council Members
| City Council Role | Name |
|---|---|
| Mayor | Paige Brown |
| Council at Large | Shawn Fennell |
| Council at Large | Steve Fann |
| District 1 | Paul Jones |
| District 2 | Todd Alexander |
| District 3 | Pascal Jouvence |
| District 4 | Craig Hayes |
| District 5 | Steven Carter |

== Education ==
=== Board of education ===
Gallatin's schools are governed by the Sumner County Board of Education. The board consists of eleven elected representatives from each of the eleven single-member districts in the county. The members serve staggered four-year terms. They oversee the Director of Schools, Dr. Scott Langford, who serves under contract to the board. The board conducts monthly meetings that are open to the public. The school system's General Purpose School Fund budget during the 2025–26 school year was approximately $402 million.

The county-wide school system consists of approximately 4,300 employees and 49 schools. The system has more than 180 bus routes which cover more than 6,000 miles (9,700 km) per day. The floor space in all of the county's schools totals more than 100 acres (0.40 km^{2}). Approximately 29,400 students were enrolled in the county school system as of August 2020.

=== Schools ===
Elementary schools (K–5)

- Benny Bills Elementary School
- Guild Elementary School (also pre-K)
- Howard Elementary School (also pre-K)
- Liberty Creek Elementary School
- Station Camp Elementary School (also pre-K)
- Union Elementary STEM and Demonstration School (year-round school)
- Vena Stuart Elementary School

Middle schools (6–8)

- Joe Shafer Middle School
- Liberty Creek Middle School
- Station Camp Middle School
- Rucker-Stewart Middle School

High schools (9–12)

- Gallatin High School
- Liberty Creek High School
- Station Camp High School

Alternative schools

- R. T. Fischer Alternative School (K–12)

Private schools

- Saint John Vianney Catholic School (pre-K–8)
- Southside Christian School (K–12)
- Sumner Academy (pre-K–8)

=== Higher education ===
Volunteer State Community College is a public two-year community college. Popularly known as Vol State, it is part of the Tennessee Board of Regents system. The main campus is located in Gallatin. There are also degree granting centers at McGavock High School in Nashville and Vol State at Livingston in Overton County. Additional class sites are located at the Highland Crest campus in Robertson County, and in Macon County and Wilson County. Since its 1971 inception, more than 150,000 persons have attended the college. Currently, more than 8,000 students are enrolled in the average fall semester. The college has a diverse mix of students ranging in age from teens to senior adults. They come from counties across the service area, many states around the US and more than 25 countries. Vol State has more than 70 programs in five grand divisions: humanities, social science and education, allied health, business and math and science.

Welch College is a private Free Will Baptist, four-year Christian college in Gallatin. Founded in 1942, it is one of several higher learning institutions associated with the National Association of Free Will Baptists. As of 2019, Welch College served 431 students from nearly two dozen states and several foreign countries. It offers 40 majors with its top programs including theological studies, premed/nursing, business, teacher education and music.

== Media ==
=== Print ===
One local newspaper covers events in Gallatin: The Gallatin Newspaper, published on Thursdays. The city's original newspaper, The Gallatin News Examiner, founded in 1859, ceased publication in 2017.

=== Radio and television ===
Gallatin received its first local radio station in August 1948 when WHIN 1010 AM, went on the air. Owned at one time by the record mogul Randy Wood, the station still serves Sumner County with country music, local sports and coverage of NASCAR racing.

WHIN broadcast only in the daytime. Starting in 1950, the on-air studios at night were the production site for Dot Records. Its original headquarters were in the town. Six years later, Dot moved to Hollywood, California.

WHIN was joined by an FM station in December 1960 when 104.5 came on the air. The FM station has broadcast under many call letters. Probably its most famous days were in the late 1970s and 1980s, when it was known as KX (pronounced Kicks) 104, a popular music station that battled with Nashville stations for top listenership. During that time the station was owned by Ron Bledsoe, a former employee in his younger years, who commanded CBS Records in Nashville.

In the early 21st century, the station is owned by Citadel sports radio station WGFX. It targets the Nashville market and is the flagship station for the Tennessee Titans and Tennessee Volunteers.

WMRO (1560) came to the air in 1994 to serve the community. It plays an automated Hot AC format, along with local religious programming on Sunday mornings.

Volunteer State Community College operates a radio and television station. The student-run radio station, WVCP, broadcasts on 88.5 MHz FM, and plays music of various formats.

The television station is broadcast on Comcast Cable channel 19. The channel displays local announcements related to the college and the Gallatin/Sumner County area. The audio portion of the channel is a simulcast of the radio station. The channel also airs educational programs, usually at high school or college levels. Gallatin City Council meetings, Sumner County School Board meetings and Sumner County Commission meetings are also broadcast by the station.

== Infrastructure ==
=== Transportation ===
- / U.S. Route 31E / Tennessee State Route 6 (Note: Unsigned) (Nashville Pike)
- / Tennessee State Route 386 / U.S. Route 31E Bypass (Note: Unsigned) (Vietnam Veterans Boulevard)
- Tennessee State Route 109
- Tennessee State Route 25 (Red River Road)
- Tennessee State Route 174 (Long Hollow Pike) / (Water Avenue) / (Dobbins Pike)

Major roadways leading in and out of Gallatin include State Route 386 ("Vietnam Veterans Boulevard"), U.S. Highway 31E, State Route 109 and State Route 25. U.S. 31E, also known as "Nashville Pike" or "Gallatin Road", is the main thoroughfare through town. State Route 109 forms a bypass west of the downtown area, and State Route 386 is a controlled access highway that ends in Gallatin and connects the area to Interstate 65 to the west.

WeGo Public Transit provides a daily bus service from Gallatin to downtown Nashville, with stops along the way.

The Sumner County Regional Airport provides air transportation in and out of Gallatin. The facility is equipped with one 5,000-foot (1,500 m) runway with a 1,000 grass overrun. It also provides fueling and maintenance services.

The Regional Transportation Authority has future plans to expand the current WeGo Star commuter railway to include a line running between Gallatin and Nashville, with a stop in Hendersonville.

History

Tennessee State Route 6 and Tennessee State Route 25 were the two original state routes in Gallatin, established between 1919 and 1925. SR 25 was extended west into Robertson County in 1925. US 31E was one of the first U.S. routes commissioned in November 1926. The only major change to the route since its commissioning has been the creation of a 4 lane highway that replaced the original Main Street route in 1980. Around 1940, another state route was created in Gallatin, State Route 109 (SR 109), it originally ran only between Gallatin and Portland. SR 109 got a major reroute to a restricted access bypass in the 1990s as part of a project to improve SR 109 from Gallatin to Portland. This project was completed in 2012. Tennessee State Route 386 (SR 386) was completed in 2007 in Gallatin.

=== Healthcare ===
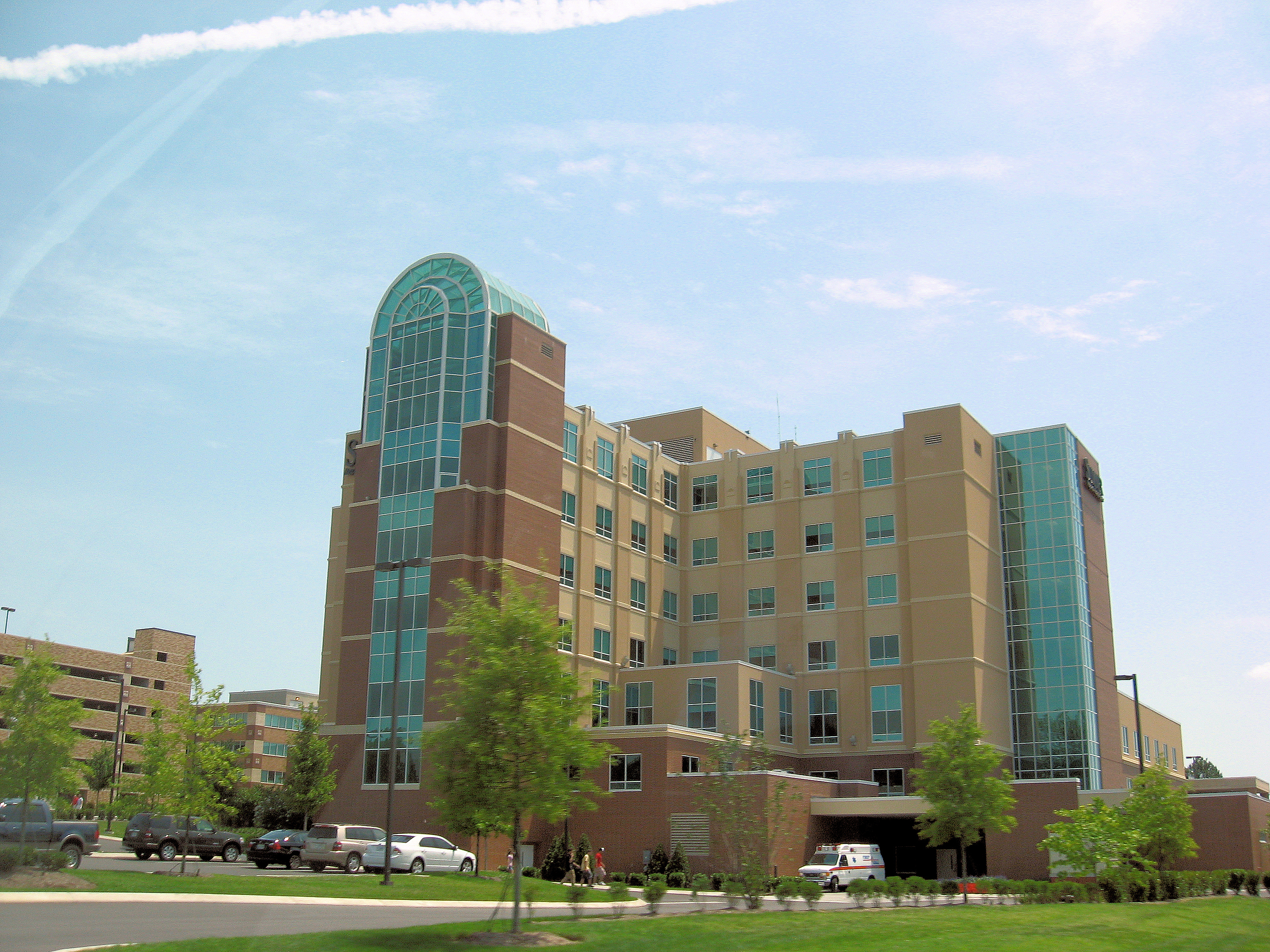
Sumner Regional Medical Center

Highpoint Health, formerly Sumner Regional Medical Center, is a hospital located in Gallatin. It has an emergency room, a nationally recognized cancer-treatment program, a wound care center, a cardiac catheterization lab, and a diagnostic sleep center. The staff can also perform digital mammography, interventional cardiology, neurosurgery, computerized knee replacement surgery, and PET therapy, among other procedures.

The Gallatin Health Department, with two locations, provides women and children's services, flu shots, special needs services, testing for sexually transmitted diseases and tuberculosis, family planning, and immunizations. The department also inspects restaurants, hotels, campgrounds, day care centers, schools, and other public facilities where food is served, to ensure proper sanitation. Additionally, it is responsible for investigating animal bites, rabies, and other animal-related diseases.

== Notable people ==
- Joe Blanton, Major League Baseball (MLB) pitcher. He was a member of the 2008 World Series Philadelphia Phillies championship squad. He retired in 2017.
- Daniel Loper, former NFL offensive lineman
- Zach Duke, MLB pitcher
- Mike Elizondo, record producer
- Isaac Franklin, antebellum planter
- William M. Gwin (1805–1885), U.S. senator from California (1850–1855, 1857–1861)
- Bill Hagerty, U.S. senator from Tennessee, former U.S. ambassador to Japan (2017–2019)
- Huell Howser (1945–2013), national public television personality
- Lena Terrell Jackson (1865–1943), African-American educator
- Lucas Leon, American Idol season 24 contestant
- Sondra Locke (1944–2018), actress and director
- Jordan Mason, National Football League (NFL) running back
- Michael Moore, NFL guard who coaches with the Station Camp High School Bison
- Ray Oldham (1951–2005), NFL defensive back
- John Rogan (1865–1905), second tallest verified human being ever at 8 feet 9 inches (2.67 m)
- Tennys Sandgren, professional tennis player
- Chase Matthew, Country music singer

== See also ==
- List of municipalities in Tennessee
- National Register of Historic Places listings in Sumner County, Tennessee
- Fairvue Plantation
