= Lake Eufaula (Oklahoma) =

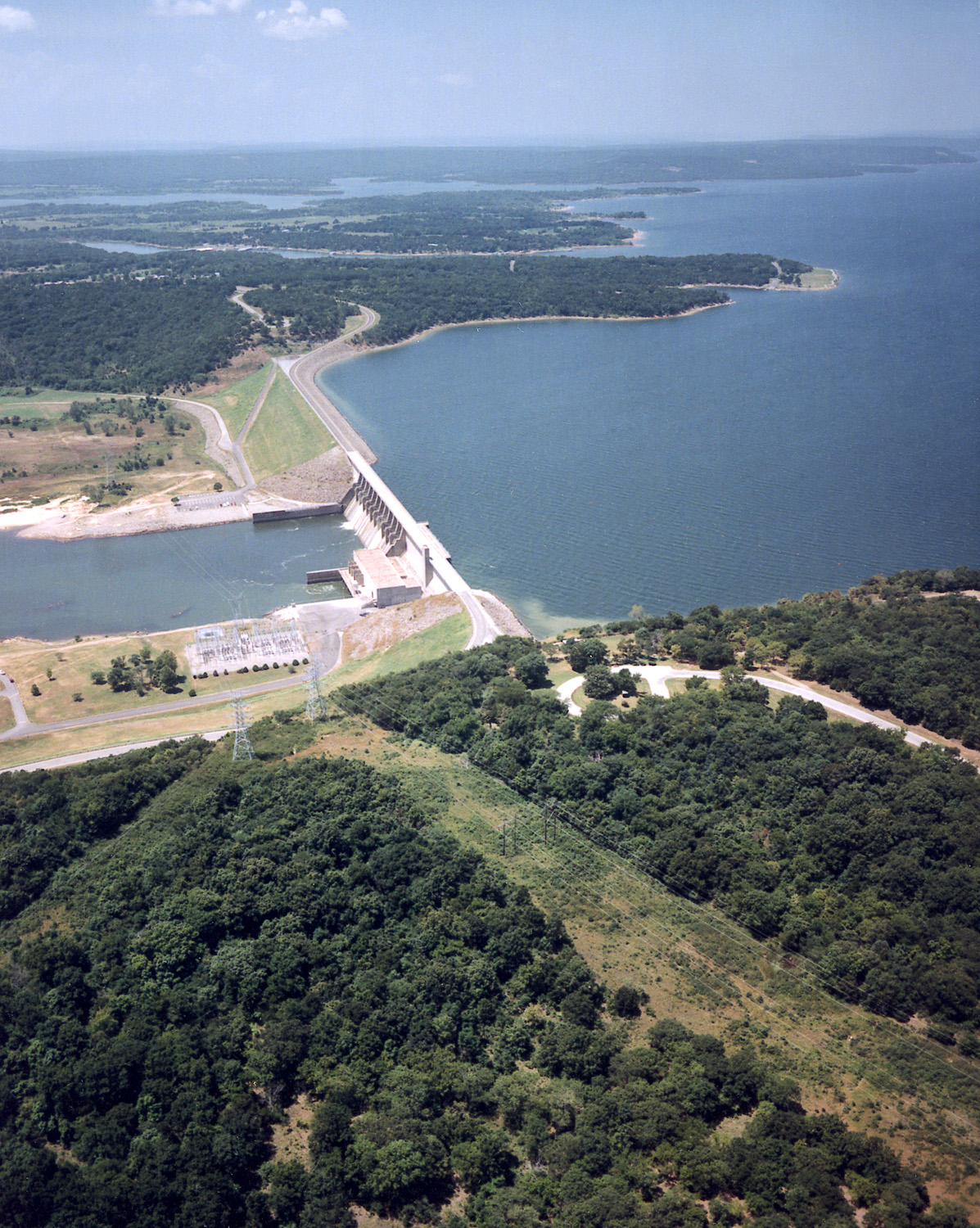
- Aerial view of Lake and Dam

- Location within Oklahoma
- Location: Haskell / McIntosh / Pittsburg counties, Oklahoma, US
- Coordinates: 35°16′51″N 95°31′47″W
- Lake type: reservoir
- Primary inflows: North and South Canadian Rivers
- Primary outflows: Canadian River
- Basin countries: United States
- Surface area: 102,000 acres (410 km^{2})
- Average depth: 23 ft (7.0 m) (avg.)
- Max. depth: 87 ft (27 m)
- Water volume: 2,099,000 acre-feet (2.589×10^{9} m^{3}) (full pool)
- Shore length^{1}: 600 mi (970 km)
- Surface elevation: 585 ft (178 m)
- ^{1} Shore length is not a well-defined measure.

Lake Eufaula, sometimes referred to as Eufaula Lake, is a reservoir in Oklahoma. It is located on the Canadian River, 27 mi (43 km) upstream from its confluence with the Arkansas River and near the town of Eufaula. The lake covers parts of McIntosh County, Pittsburg, Haskell and Okmulgee counties and drains 47,522 square miles (123,080 km^{2}). Water sources include the Canadian, North Fork Canadian and Deep Fork rivers. It is the largest-capacity lake in the state of Oklahoma with a volume of 2,099,000 acre-feet (2.589×10^{9} m^{3}), a surface area of 102,000 acres (410 km^{2}) and 600 miles (970 km) of shoreline.

It is one of Oklahoma's 'Big Three' lakes, along with Lake Tenkiller and Grand Lake o' the Cherokees.

== History ==
Congress approved construction of the dam and lake in 1946 to provide flood control, hydroelectric power, water supply, navigation and recreation. The U. S. Army Corps of Engineers began construction of the 975 meter-long (3,199 feet) Eufaula Dam wall in 1956 and was completed in 1964. President Lyndon B. Johnson came to Oklahoma to dedicate the dam on September 25, 1964. The dam holds back a lake area of over 412 square kilometres (159 sq mi). The hydroelectric power station was designed to provide 90,000 kilowatts of electric power from the lake waters.

According to the Corps of Engineers in 2015, the Eufaula project cost $121.4 million, and has prevented nearly $575.5 million in flood damages since its completion. The lake attracts about 2.5 million visitors every year.

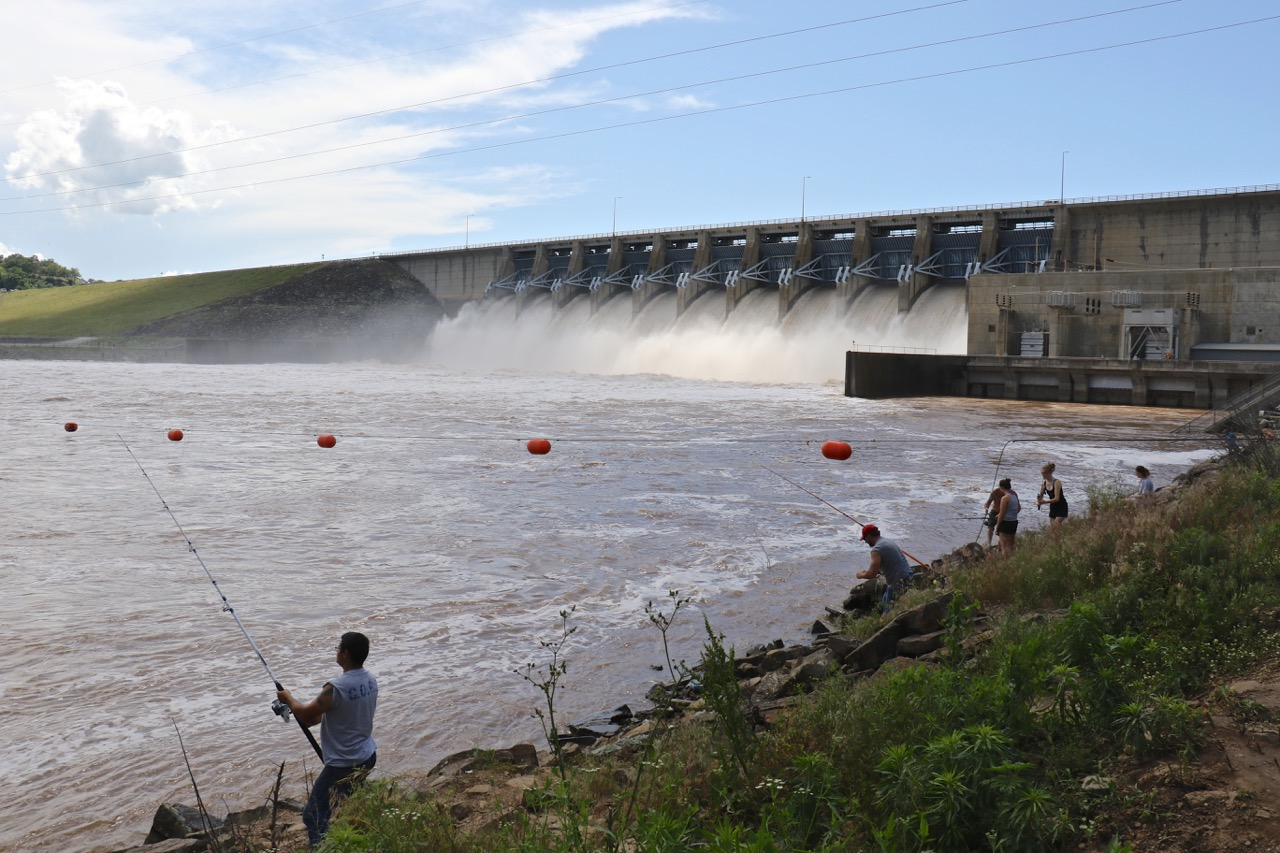
Fishing at Eufaula Dam

Heavy rains in the spring of 2015 caused Lake Eufaula to rise so rapidly that the Corps of Engineers opened the flood gates and released water at rates as high as 48,000 cubic feet (1,400 m^{3}) per second. This was the highest rate since 1990.

== Dam construction ==
Eufaula Dam
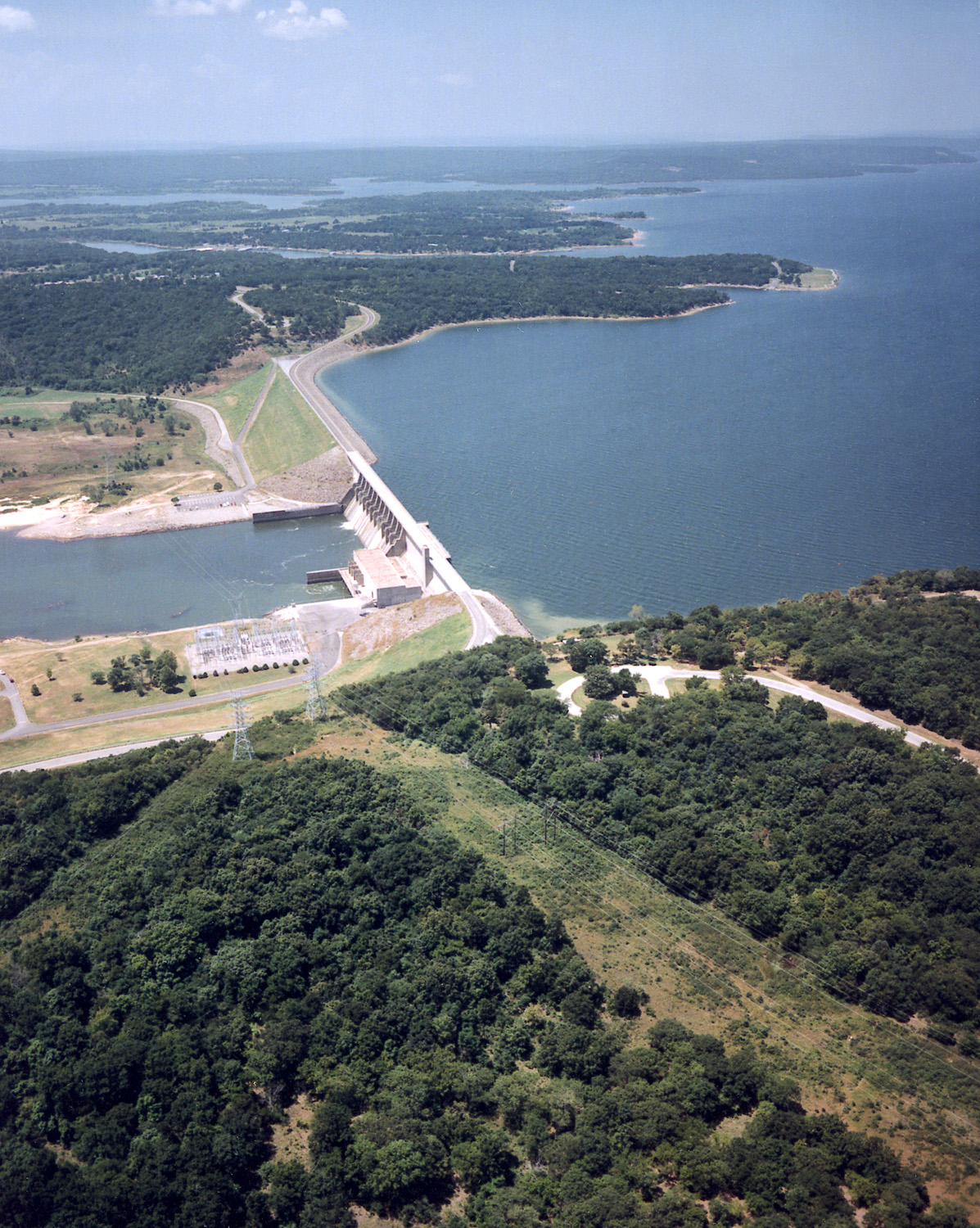
- Interactive map of Eufaula Dam
- Location: East of Eufaula, Oklahoma
- Status: Operational
- Construction began: 1956
- Opening date: 1964
- Owner: U.S. Army Corps of Engineers

Dam and spillways
- Type of dam: Earthen embankment, concrete gravity composite
- Impounds: Canadian River
- Height: 114 ft (35 m)
- Length: 3,200 ft (975 m)
- Spillways: 11
- Spillway type: Tainter gate-controlled ogee weir
- Spillway capacity: 465,000 cu ft/s (13,167 m^{3}/s)

Reservoir
- Creates: Eufaula Lake
- Surface area: 102,000 acres (413 km^{2})

Power Station
- Commission date: 1964
- Turbines: 3 x 30 MW
- Installed capacity: 90 MW

Eufaula Dam is east of the city of Eufaula, Oklahoma. It is 3,200 feet (975 m) long and 114 feet (35 m) high. It is constructed with an earthen embankment and concrete. The associated hydroelectric power plant has three turbines, each rated at 30 megawatts, for a total installed capacity of 90 megawatts The dam was approved by the Rivers and Harbors Act of 1946 and construction began in 1956. In February 1964, the river was closed and the generators went operational in September 1964. State Highway 71 runs across the top of the dam.

== Standing Rock ==
Standing Rock is now covered by the waters of Lake Eufaula. The historic landmark stood in the middle of the Canadian river about two miles (3.2 km) below the junction of the North and South Canadians. When the lake is at its top level, 585 feet (178 m), the top of the huge upright rock is approximately 25 feet (7.6 m) below the surface.

== Recreational facilities ==
Activities at Lake Eufaula include boating, fishing, swimming, hiking, hunting, golfing and horseback riding. Picnic areas are scattered throughout the area. Facilities include marinas, boat ramps, swim beaches, tent and RV campsites, cabins, group shelters, restrooms, showers and an enclosed fishing dock. These can be found at Lake Eufaula State Park and the physically-separate Arrowhead Area at Lake Eufaula State Park.

A well-known tournament lake, Lake Eufaula draws anglers from across the United States to test their skills at catching largemouth bass, smallmouth bass, Kentucky bass, crappie, catfish, sandbass, stripers (below the dam), and other species.

== Former State Park Lodges ==
Oklahoma created two state parks, Arrowhead and Fountainhead, to provide recreational activities and camping facilities at the lake. The tag line in their early advertising was, "Follow the fun to Eufaula." The state borrowed $8 million from the Federal government to build a lodge at each park. However, the lodges did not provide enough money to repay the loan, so ownership reverted to the Federal government. In 1986, the U.S. Economic Administration sold Arrowhead Lodge to the Choctaw Nation and Fountainhead Lodge to a group of private investors. Arrowhead switched hands again in 2000, when a non-profit group with ties to the Church of Scientology bought the lodge and converted it into a drug and alcohol treatment facility, now called Narconon Arrowhead. Fountainhead was sold out of a sheriff's sale to The Muscogee (Creek) Nation in 2005, amid plans to reopen it as a gaming facility. Those plans never materialized, and the lodge was torn down. However, a 48-acre tract of the land was placed into federal trust status in 2018, opening the way for development of the property as a tourist destination with gaming, restaurants and entertainment.

=== Marinas ===
List of Marinas on Lake Eufaula.

- Area 51 Marina
- Belle Starr Marina
- Duchess Creek Marina
- Eufaula Cove Marina
- Evergreen Marina
- Lake Eufaula Marina
- No. 9 Marina
