= Eufaula Dam =

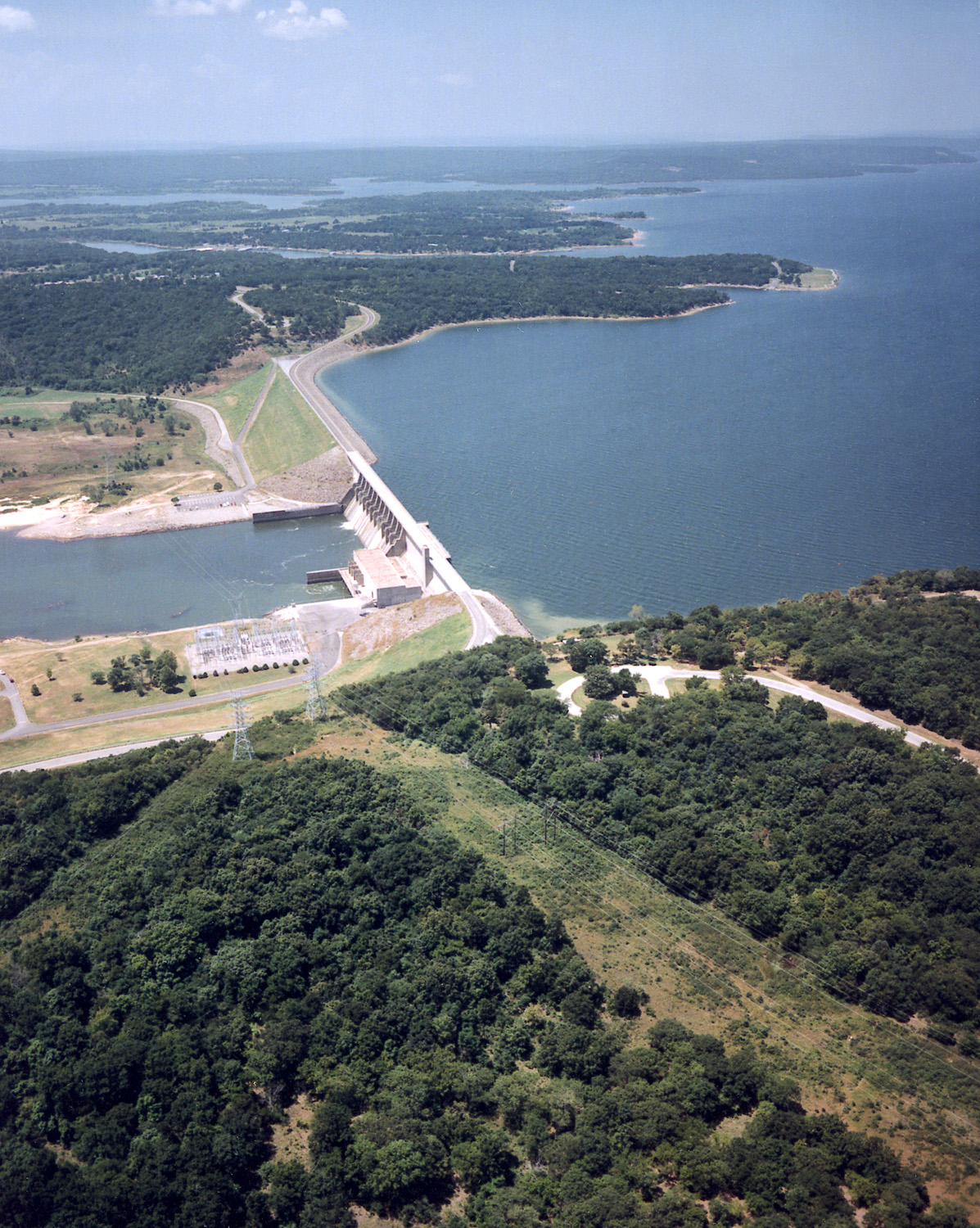

- Location within Oklahoma
- Country: United States
- Location: Haskell / McIntosh counties, east of Eufaula, Oklahoma
- Coordinates: 35°18′25″N 95°21′29″W
- Status: Operational
- Construction began: 1956
- Opening date: 1964
- Owner: U.S. Army Corps of Engineers

Dam and spillways
- Type of dam: Earthen embankment, concrete gravity composite
- Impounds: Canadian River
- Height: 114 ft (35 m)
- Length: 3,200 ft (975 m)
- Spillways: 11
- Spillway type: Tainter gate-controlled ogee weir
- Spillway capacity: 465,000 cu ft/s (13,167 m^{3}/s)

Reservoir
- Creates: Eufaula Lake
- Total capacity: 2,099,000 acre⋅ft (2.589078377×10^{9} m^{3})
- Surface area: 102,000 acres (413 km^{2})

Power Station
- Commission date: 1964
- Turbines: 3 x 30 MW
- Installed capacity: 90 MW

Eufaula Dam is a dam across the Canadian River in Oklahoma. Completed in 1964, it impounds Eufaula Lake, one of the world's largest man-made lakes, covering 102,500 acres (41,500 hectares). The dam serves to provide flood control, water supply, navigation and hydroelectric power generation. It supports a 90 MW power station; three generators produce 30 MW each.

== History ==
State Highway 71 runs across the top of the dam.

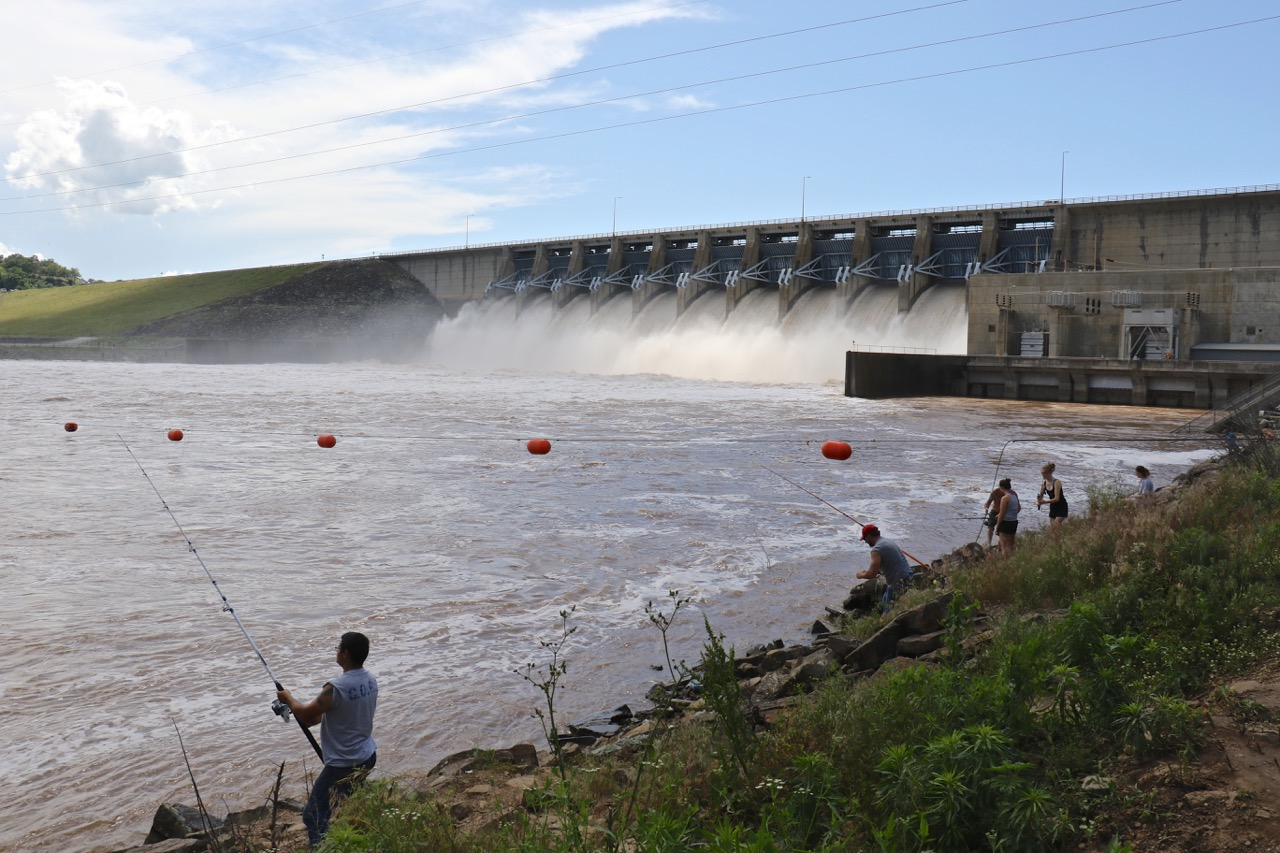
Fishing at Eufaula Dam

The dam was approved by Rivers and Harbors Act of 1946 and construction began in December 1956. The cost of the project, completed by the U.S. Army Corps of Engineers, was $121,735,000. The flood-control operations of the dam were in place by February 1964, and the dam dedicated by President Lyndon B. Johnson on September 25, 1964.

Heavy rains in the spring of 2015, caused Eufaula Lake to rise so rapidly that the Corps of Engineers had to open the flood gates and release water at rates as high as 48,000 cubic feet (1,400 m^{3}) per second. This was the highest rate since 1990.
