= Volunteer State Community College =

College in Gallatin, Tennessee, U.S.

- Students walk across main campus
- Type: Public community college
- Established: 1971; 55 years ago
- Parent institution: Tennessee Board of Regents
- President: Dr. Wendi Tostenson
- Students: 8,400 average fall semester enrollment
- Location: Gallatin, Tennessee, United States; 36.3624°N 86.4973°W
- Colors: Blue and Red
- Nickname: Pioneers
- Website: www.volstate.edu

Volunteer State Community College (Vol State) is a public community college in Gallatin, Tennessee. It is part of the Tennessee Board of Regents.

Vol State serves the suburban Nashville community. The main campus of the college is 30 miles (48 km) to the northeast in the Nashville suburb of Gallatin. In total, Vol State serves 11 counties in northern Middle Tennessee: Clay, Jackson, Macon, Overton, Pickett, Putnam, Robertson, Smith, Sumner, Trousdale, and Wilson.

The main campus is located in Gallatin. The college also has degree-granting centers in Livingston, Tennessee, Springfield and Cookeville. Vol State offers classes in traditional, online, and hybrid formats.

== Academics ==
Vol State offers more than 100 programs of study in six major divisions: Health Sciences, Math and Science, Humanities, Business and Technology, Nursing, and Social Science and Education. The college is accredited by the Southern Association of Colleges and Schools to award the A.A. (associate of arts), A.S. (associate of science), A.A.S (associate of applied science), A.S.T (associate of science in teaching), and A.F.A (associate of fine arts) degrees. The college also offers numerous technical certificates in a variety of disciplines. Vol State participates in the Tennessee Promise and TN Reconnect programs, which, respectively, provide tuition-free classes for graduating high school seniors, and adult students who don't already have a college degree. It also offers some financial aid assistance for people with a degree who are considering pursuing a new degree.

== Administration ==
- Hal R. Ramer (founding president 1971–2004)
- Warren Nichols (2004–2011)
- Jerry Faulkner (2012–2021)
- Orinthia T. Montague (2021–2023)
- Russ Deaton (Interim 2023-2024)
- Wendi Tostenson (2024-)

== Campus ==
=== Vol State at Livingston ===
Vol State at Livingston, located at 113 Windle Community Road, is a full service degree-granting location of Volunteer State Community College. The campus underwent a major multi-year construction project transforming the original building into a new facility. It features 15 classrooms with the latest teaching technology; ITV interactive television classroom, science-biology lab, computer lab, library, 18 faculty offices, administration offices, outdoor and indoor study areas. Several of the classrooms are prepared for Allied Health classes.

Vol State offers the associate of science and associate of applied science degrees at Livingston. Classes include general education, vocational and career development courses. They are scheduled during the day and evening. Formats include online and traditional classroom courses.

=== Vol State at Springfield ===
Vol State at Springfield is a degree-granting center. It offers classes at the Highland Crest campus in Springfield, Tennessee. Highland Crest is located just off Highway 431 in Springfield, William Batson Parkway at 150 Laureate Avenue. This $4.4 million facility contains 25,000 square feet of space housing four classrooms, a multipurpose room, a science lab, an interactive television (ITV) classroom, a bookstore, a library, a learning support center, and ten faculty offices. Classes offered at this campus include general education requirements for most degree programs.

=== Vol State at Cookeville ===
Vol State at Cookeville is a degree-granting center. It offers classes at the CHEC campus in Cookeville and features a science lab, mechatronics lab, study areas, and an outdoor plaza. Classes include general education requirements for most degree programs. The campus is located at 1000 Neal Street in Cookeville.

=== April 7, 2006 Tornado at Gallatin campus ===
The college was damaged heavily in a tornado outbreak on April 7, 2006. Two buildings suffered direct hits from the twister, and more than 90 cars in the parking lots were damaged and destroyed. There were only minor injuries on campus. The Hal Reed Ramer Administration Building received major damage, including damage to the office of the President. Noble Caudill Hall suffered perhaps the worst damage, as much of the second floor on the south side of the building collapsed, and a large section of roofing above WVCP radio and the Wemyss Auditorium was ripped off and/or collapsed inward. Caudill Hall closed for more than a year and a half until repairs were completed. In all, eleven classrooms had to be relocated due to damage and 72 faculty and staff offices were moved. Volunteer State building coordinators and campus safety staff have been credited with helping to save lives on the day the tornado hit. They were honored in a ceremony at the school.

By spring of 2007, the Ramer building was fully occupied again, including a new home for the student radio station. The Caudill Building re-opened for classes on January 12, 2008. A major landscaping project was finished in spring 2008 marking the end of tornado repair.

== Student life ==
All four Vol State campuses have events and activities for students. The Student Government Association (SGA) is the student organization body that encourages participation throughout student life. Some of the student organizations outside of the SGA include Phi Theta Kappa Honors Society, Team Change, Spectrum, Artisan's Alliance, and more. Student media organizations include the weekly newspaper, The Settler, literary publication, "Pioneer Pen", Vol State radio station, WVCP. Students have free access to a fitness room in Gallatin with treadmills and workout machines.

== Athletics ==
The athletic teams at Volunteer State Community College include Baseball, Men's Basketball, Women's Basketball, and Women's Fast Pitch Softball. The intercollegiate teams have been highly successful and nationally ranked. Vol State is a member of the Western Division of the Tennessee Junior and Community College Athletic Association. Vol State is also a member of the National Junior College Athletic Association Region VII.

The Vol State baseball team went to the Junior College World Series twice, in 1994 and 1999. The softball team competed in the Division One NJCAA Softball Championship in 2011 and went to the final round in 2012. Cincinnati Reds all-star pitcher Steve Delabar attended the school.

The Vol State Softball team won the TCCAA Region 7 Championship in 2011.

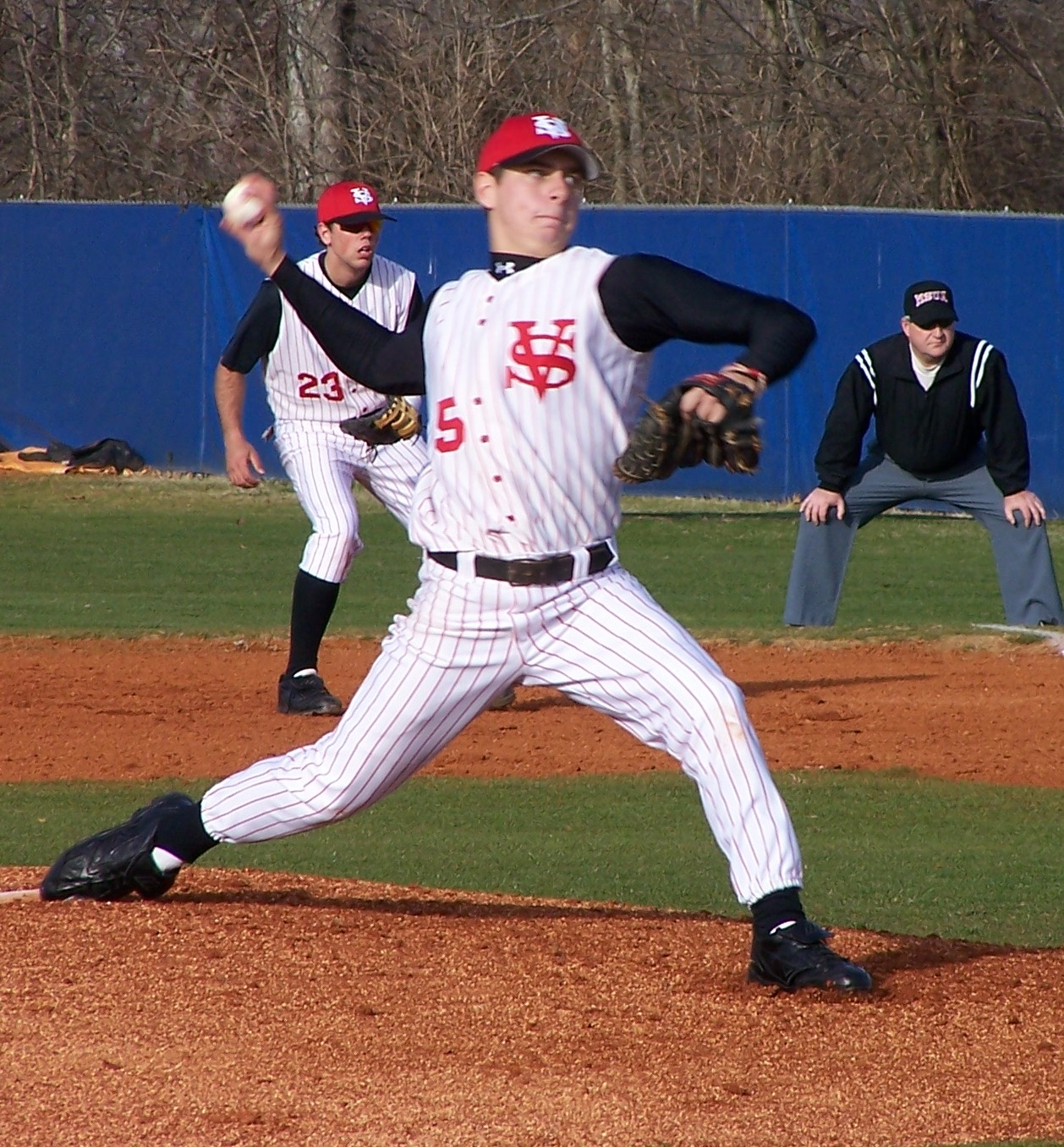
The Baseball Team went to the TCCAA Regional finals in 2007, 2008 and 2012. They were Regional Champions in 2009.

The Men's Basketball Team

The Women's Basketball Team

== See also ==
- WVCP - campus radio station
