= Quinton, Oklahoma =

- Town
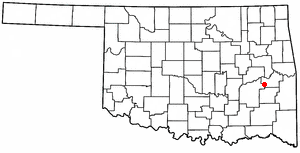
- Location of Quinton, Oklahoma
- Coordinates: 35°07′33″N 95°22′02″W
- Country: United States
- State: Oklahoma
- County: Pittsburg

Area
  - Total: 0.90 sq mi (2.32 km^{2})
  - Land: 0.90 sq mi (2.32 km^{2})
  - Water: 0.0039 sq mi (0.01 km^{2})
- Elevation: 633 ft (193 m)

Population (2020)
  - Total: 863
  - Density: 965.5/sq mi (372.78/km^{2})
- Time zone: UTC-6 (Central (CST))
  - Summer (DST): UTC-5 (CDT)
- ZIP code: 74561
- Area codes: 539/918
- FIPS code: 40-61550
- GNIS feature ID: 2412520
- Website: townofquinton.com

Quinton is a town in Pittsburg County, Oklahoma, United States. As of the 2020 census, Quinton had a population of 863. The town was named for Elizabeth Quinton, who lived to be 116 years old. Her family still resides in and around the town of Quinton. Web address https://townofquinton.com/

== History ==
A post office was established at Quinton, Indian Territory on March 28, 1902. It was named for Martha Elizabeth Quinton, a prominent local Choctaw. At the time of its founding, Quinton was located in Gaines County, Choctaw Nation.

== Geography ==
According to the United States Census Bureau, the town has a total area of 1.1 square miles (2.8 km^{2}), of which 1.1 square miles (2.8 km^{2}) is land and 0.88% is water.

== Demographics ==
Historical population
Census	Pop.	Note	%±
1910	697		—
1920	1,557		123.4%
1930	1,804		15.9%
1940	1,245		−31.0%
1950	951		−23.6%
1960	898		−5.6%
1970	1,262		40.5%
1980	1,228		−2.7%
1990	1,133		−7.7%
2000	1,071		−5.5%
2010	1,051		−1.9%
2020	863		−17.9%
U.S. Decennial Census

=== 2020 census ===
As of the 2020 census, Quinton had a population of 863. The median age was 37.6 years. 28.4% of residents were under the age of 18 and 16.2% of residents were 65 years of age or older. For every 100 females there were 98.4 males, and for every 100 females age 18 and over there were 90.7 males age 18 and over.

0.0% of residents lived in urban areas, while 100.0% lived in rural areas.

There were 334 households in Quinton, of which 35.6% had children under the age of 18 living in them. Of all households, 44.3% were married-couple households, 18.6% were households with a male householder and no spouse or partner present, and 29.9% were households with a female householder and no spouse or partner present. About 28.2% of all households were made up of individuals and 8.4% had someone living alone who was 65 years of age or older.

There were 401 housing units, of which 16.7% were vacant. The homeowner vacancy rate was 2.2% and the rental vacancy rate was 14.7%.

Racial composition as of the 2020 census
Race	Number	Percent
White	560	64.9%
Black or African American	3	0.3%
American Indian and Alaska Native	160	18.5%
Asian	3	0.3%
Native Hawaiian and Other Pacific Islander	1	0.1%
Some other race	17	2.0%
Two or more races	119	13.8%
Hispanic or Latino (of any race)	43	5.0%

=== 2000 census ===
As of the census of 2000, there were 1,071 people, 446 households, and 293 families residing in the town. The population density was 954.8 inhabitants per square mile (368.7/km^{2}). There were 509 housing units at an average density of 453.8 per square mile (175.2/km^{2}). The racial makeup of the town was 79.93% White, 0.19% African American, 16.15% Native American, 0.19% Asian, 0.19% from other races, and 3.36% from two or more races. Hispanic or Latino of any race were 0.93% of the population.

There were 446 households, out of which 28.3% had children under the age of 18 living with them, 46.2% were married couples living together, 16.4% had a female householder with no husband present, and 34.1% were non-families. 31.8% of all households were made up of individuals, and 18.4% had someone living alone who was 65 years of age or older. The average household size was 2.33 and the average family size was 2.94.

In the town, the population was spread out, with 24.9% under the age of 18, 7.6% from 18 to 24, 25.1% from 25 to 44, 19.2% from 45 to 64, and 23.2% who were 65 years of age or older. The median age was 40 years. For every 100 females, there were 94.7 males. For every 100 females age 18 and over, there were 85.7 males.

The median income for a household in the town was $19,531, and the median income for a family was $26,912. Males had a median income of $28,056 versus $16,797 for females. The per capita income for the town was $15,143. About 18.3% of families and 22.8% of the population were below the poverty line, including 29.3% of those under age 18 and 24.3% of those age 65 or over.
