= Garden City High School (Kansas) =

Location
- 2720 Buffalo Way Boulevard; Garden City, Kansas 67846; United States; 37°59′32″N 100°50′27″W

Information
- School type: Public, High School
- Established: 1910
- School board: Board Website
- School district: Garden City USD 457
- CEEB code: 171065
- Principal: Steve Nordby
- Staff: 126.30 (FTE)
- Grades: 9 to 12
- Enrollment: 1,983 (2023–24)
- Student to teacher ratio: 15.62
- Campus: Urban
- Colors: Brown; White; Gold
- Athletics conference: Western Athletic Conference
- Mascot: Buffalo
- Rival: Dodge City High School
- Accreditation: Kansas State Department of Education, Blue Ribbon 2012
- Newspaper: The Sugar Beet
- Yearbook: The Buffalo
- Website: gchs.gckschools.com

Garden City High School (known locally as GCHS) is a public high school, serving students in grades 9–12, located in Garden City, Kansas, United States. It is operated by Garden City USD 457 public school district. The school colors are brown and white. Approximately 2,200 students are enrolled for the 2025–26 school year. The current principal is Steve Nordby.

Garden City High was founded in 1910 on the site that is now Sabine Hall in order to help educate the increasing population of Garden City. In 1917, a new high school was constructed at the site that is now known as Calkins Hall and two years later, the school was renamed "Sequoayah High School". In 1954, the school moved to its previous location, and on November 4, 2008, a bond issue for a new $95 million high school was passed. The first class to graduate from the current high school location was the Class of 2013.

Garden City is a member of the Kansas State High School Activities Association and offers a variety of sports programs. Athletic teams compete in Class 6A and are known as the "Buffaloes". Extracurricular activities are also offered in the form of performing arts, school publications, and clubs. Despite rapidly rising numbers of English as a Second Language students, Garden City High School has raised student achievement in reading, mathematics and science. The school newspaper, The Sugar Beet, was established in 1910 and is the oldest high school newspaper in the state of Kansas. The school has produced several notable alumni in various fields and occupations.

== History ==
=== Early beginnings ===
- Sabine Hall
- U.S. National Register of Historic Places
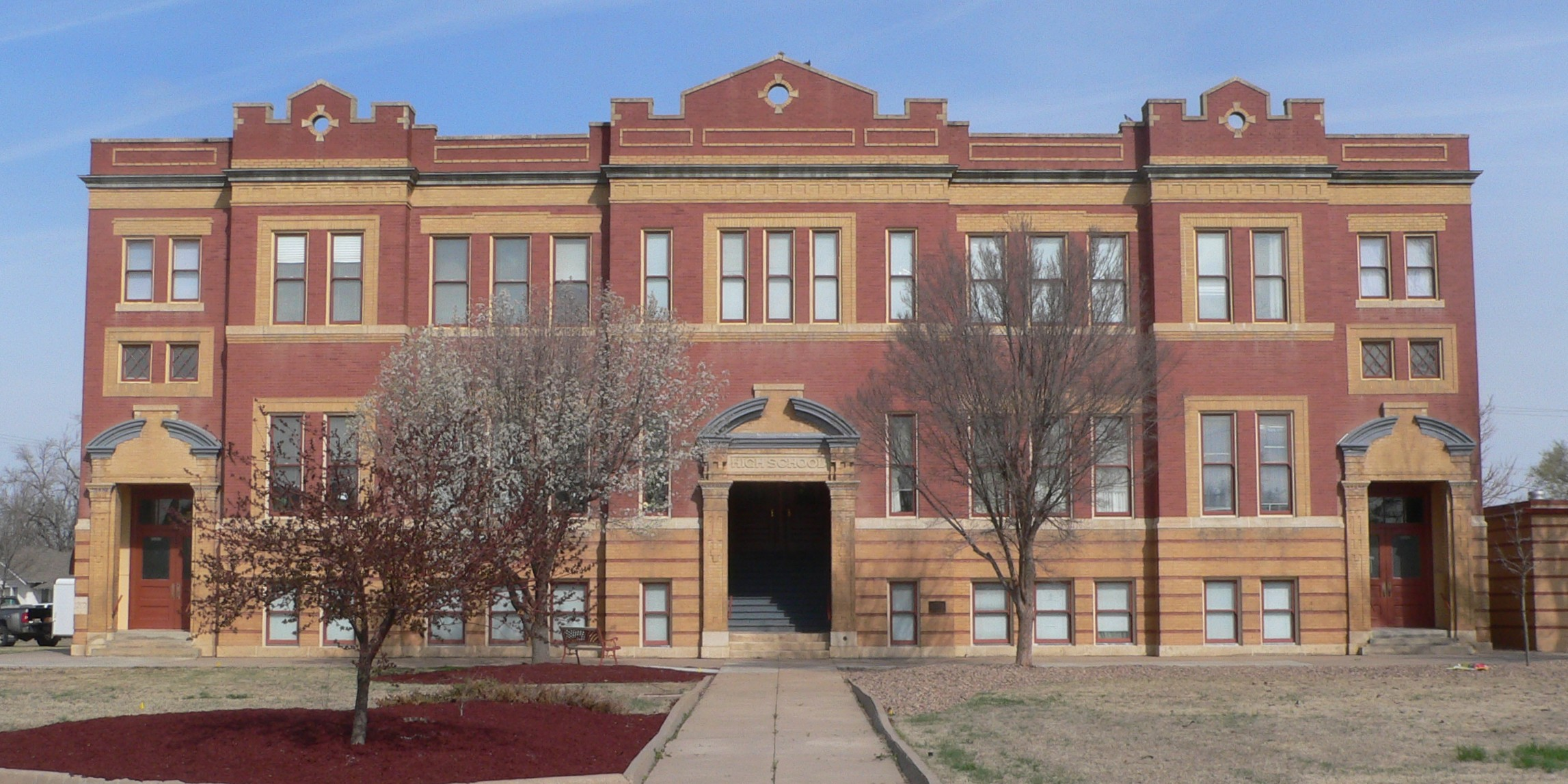
- Sabine Hall served as the original high school from 1910 to 1917.

- Location within Kansas Location within the United States
- Location: 201 Buffalo Jones Ave, Garden City, Kansas
- Coordinates: 37°58′21″N 100°52′31″W
- Built: 1910
- Architect: Stanton, J.F.; Krebs, L.C.
- Architectural style: Classical Revival
- NRHP reference No.: 96000075
- Added to NRHP: February 16, 1996

The first high school in Garden City that would eventually become Garden City High School was established in 1884 at the original Garfield School, built in 1885. The later location, named Sabine Hall was constructed in 1911. In order to educate a rapidly increasing population. the school newspaper, The Sugar Beet, was established in 1910. In 1913, the high school was accredited by the North Central Association. In 1916, the Garden City School Board set a minimum teaching standard of one year of college and two years of teaching experience for all staff members, and a year later, the high school was accredited by the U.S. Military Academy. Later that year, a new high school was constructed at the site that is now known as Calkins Hall. Two years later, the high school was renamed "Sequoyah High School". The Board of Education approved night school in 1920 and summer school was approved the following year. In 1926, vocational home economics was started and in 1927, the Board established a maximum for teaching of two years of college and two years of experience. Calkins Hall was remodeled in 1929 and 15 credits were now required for graduation. This number was increased to 16 credits in 1931 when the high school was renamed "Garden City High School". During this time, the main gym was named in honor of Ben Grimsley and was known as the "Ben Grimsley Gymnasium". The hot lunch program began in 1938.

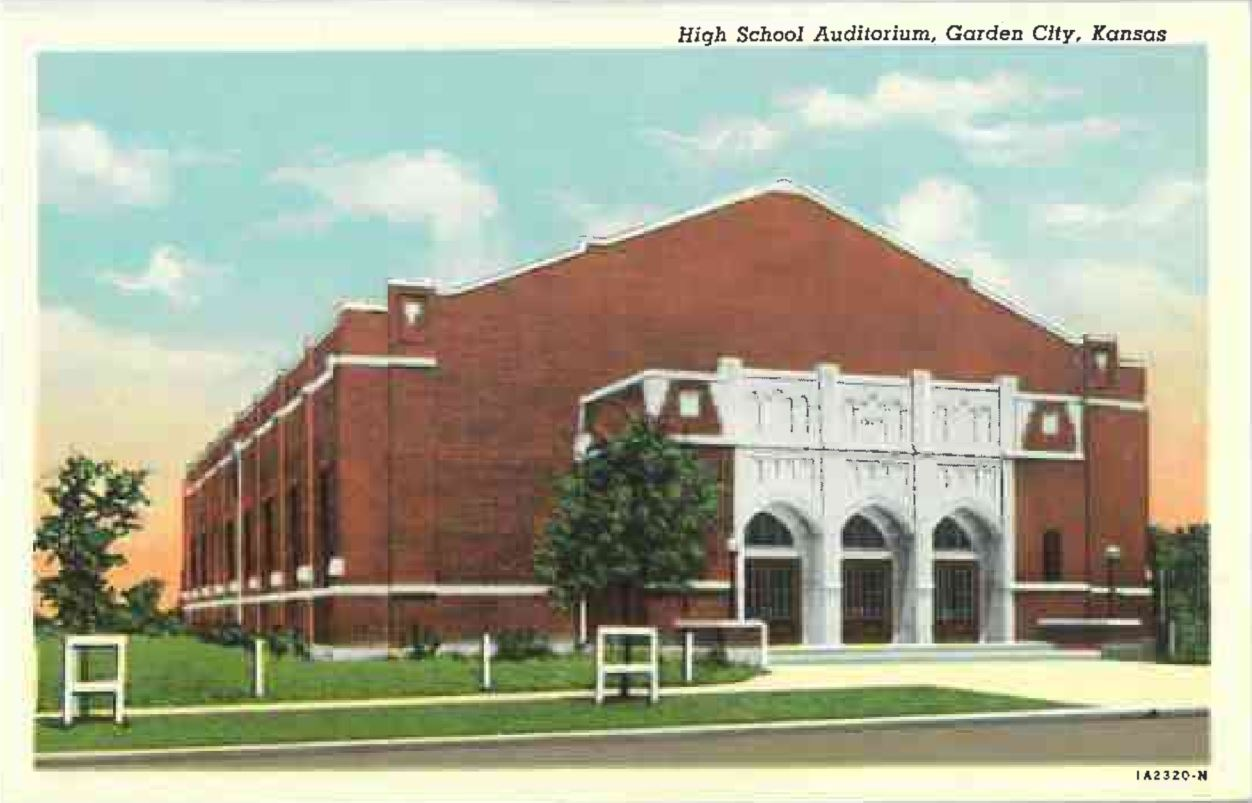
A postcard depicting the Garden City High School auditorium in 1929.

As years passed, the athletics department began to experience moderate success, and in 1945, Garden City won its first state championship in track as well as repeating the feat in 1946. A new high school was constructed in 1954, with the auditorium being completed the following year. The graduation credit limit was increased further to 19 credits in 1958. Garden City High School experienced many changes in 1959, including the creation of the counseling and honors programs, and a new dress code. The debate team also won the state championship.

=== 1960s to 1980s ===
In 1961, the main gymnasium (referred to as "The Garden") was completed and the debate team won the state championship for a second time. Also in 1961, the football team completed their first undefeated season with a 9–0 record. A year later the football stadium was constructed, which was one of the largest stadiums in western Kansas at the time. In 1964, Garden City finally experienced unification as Garden City District No. 1 became Unified School District No. 457. During this same year, the football stadium was renamed "Memorial Stadium". As interest in athletics grew throughout Garden City, so did the athletic departments. Cross-country was introduced in 1966 and the men's basketball team won their first state championship. Eight trailers were also purchased for use in the remedial reading program. One year later, a closed noon hour was initiated for all high school students. In 1968, GCHS experienced major renovations and expansion as the J.D. Adams Vocational Building was constructed and other high school remodeling was completed. The population of Garden City at this time was 14,745. The following year, an agreement was signed between the JUCO and the district relative to the exchange of the former junior college site for senior high vocational building space and other specified district facilities used by the college. The wrestling and debate teams each won their first state titles in 1971. Restrooms facilities were also added to Memorial Stadium in 1971. The men's basketball team advanced to the state championship the following year. In 1974, math requirements for graduation increased to 1½ credits which became effective with the 1978 graduating class. An addition to the music department was completed in September 1975, allowing more students to participate in a wide variety of musical activities and programs. Garden City would win its first state championship in men's golf in 1977 and progress continued throughout the rest of the decade. The practice gym and locker rooms were added in 1981. In 1984, an idea was conceived among administrators and board members of the school district to recognize past graduates of GCHS who had gone on to distinguish themselves through outstanding accomplishments. This idea was brought into action in the spring of 1984, when the first members of the Garden City High School Hall of Fame were inducted.

=== 1990s ===
The 1990s began with progress and changes. In 1991, J.D. Adams Hall was remodeled and 9th grade was moved to the high school. The Buffaloes wrestling team won four consecutive state championships from 1990 to 1993. In 1992, a new cafeteria was completed and the alternative high school was moved to 1401 W. Jones Street. Dr. Milton Pippenger was appointed superintendent in 1993 and a new enclosed walkway was constructed. Another major addition was constructed which would eventually be used as the trophy room. The city population at this time was 24,964. In 1998, the school district unsuccessfully attempted to pass a bond issue calling for a new high school. The wrestling program added two more state championships in 1998 and 1999, while the men's golf team won a state title in 1998. Additionally, the football team finished state runner-up in 1998 and won their first state championship in 1999.

Sabine Hall was listed on the National Register of Historic Places in 1996, with the alternative name, Garden City High School.

=== 21st century ===
Throughout the 2000s, GCHS experienced many significant changes. In the fall of 2003, James Mireles became the new principal, replacing former principal Kevin Burr. The men's basketball team advanced to the state semi-final in 2003 with the help of several future collegiate athletes. In 2004, artificial turf was installed at Memorial Stadium and was dedicated on April 15. The Garden City Public Schools Foundation was founded in 2004. In 2006, an open-air courtyard located at the center of the previous high school was enclosed and replaced with an atrium to increase space for lunchtime seating and activities. A new pressbox and visitor stands were constructed in 2007.

On November 4, 2008, a bond issue for a new $95 million high school was passed. In 2009, a new "Jumbotron" video scoreboard was installed on the west end of Memorial Stadium. Groundbreaking for the new high school took place on September 23, 2009, and construction was completed on April 1, 2012, at $7 million under budget. As a result, the school board approved construction of a $975,000 ticket/concession/restroom and storage building. This also allowed the asphalt parking to be changed to concrete and for adding artificial turf to the football field, which saves on future maintenance costs. Installation of the football field's turf was completed in September 2011. In early 2012, the Board of Education approved a 1-1 initiative, providing every student with an iPad. In 2012, GCHS was selected as one of 314 Blue Ribbon Schools nationwide by the US Department of Education. The Blue Ribbon Award recognizes public and private schools which perform at high levels or have made significant academic improvements. In addition, principal James Mireles was honored with the Terrel H. Bell Award for Outstanding Leadership. The first class to graduate from the current high school building was the Class of 2013. The wrestling program won four consecutive state championships from 2013 to 2016. On October 13, 2015, the Kansas Supreme Court visited Garden City. In the court's 154-year history, it was only the second time for the court to hear cases in the evening. The session was held at the high school, which was the first time the court session was held in a high school facility. One year later, the Buffalo Living Legacy Fund was established. The marching band received new uniforms in 2017. In 2018, the robotics program won the BEST (Boosting Engineering Science Technology) competition at Wichita State University and the culinary program was named to Elite 50 for the fourth year in a row.

== Academics ==
Garden City High School was designated a Blue Ribbon School in 2012.

There are four academies at the high school; School of Trade and Health Sciences, Academy of Arts and Communications, Academy of Public Service and the Ninth Grade Academy.

Despite rapidly rising numbers of English as a Second Language students, Garden City High School has raised student achievement in reading, mathematics and science. Even with a more rigorous curriculum and higher graduation requirements, the dropout rate fell from 15 percent in 1993–1994 to 3.4 percent in 2003–2004 and the attendance rate rose from 89 percent to 96 percent. In 2009, 18 students earned top rankings in the Spanish National Exams sponsored by the American Association of Teachers of Spanish and Portuguese. In 2012, GCHS was selected as one of 314 Blue Ribbon Schools nationwide.

Currently, Garden City requires students to complete 26½ credits in order to graduate. Many students also attend classes at Garden City Community College for college credit prior to graduation.

== School layout ==
=== Former high school ===
The previous high school building was constructed in 1954 and the overall campus eventually expanded to include several buildings. The main building consisted of several halls. The main hall was the longest hall in the school and consisted of several classrooms. It was attached to the main entrance on the west and met the trophy room on the east. The John D. Adams Vocational Technology building stood by itself next to the main building. There were two gymnasiums on campus. The main gym was often referred to as "The Garden" and accommodated approximately 2,000 people. There were also 8 trailers located on the north side of the school to help provide additional classrooms. These trailers were used largely for English and History classes.

GCHS underwent a major remodeling project during the 2005–2006 school year. An open courtyard had previously existed in the central section of the school which had gone largely unused. School officials met and decided to enclose the courtyard and transform the space into a multi-purpose atrium tetrastylum. After nearly a year, construction was completed. The new multi-purpose area was used for additional seating during lunchtime, as well as conferences, banquets, and additional uses. The atrium featured a projection screen, a flat-screen HDTV, additional storage closets, a small elevated stage area, several unique design features, and additional entrances/exits to classrooms. The renovation was, however, largely regarded by students and residents of Garden City as a waste of resources, owing to the construction of the current high school. One of the main reasons for the enclosure of the courtyard was to provide adequate room for most of its students in a lunchroom of some sort. However, at the time, the high school espoused an open lunch policy, and consequently a majority of its close to 2,000 students left campus for lunch. Administrators responded to this in the 2007–2008 school year by closing lunch to freshmen, and the following year by closing lunch to sophomores who do not have special identification cards.

=== Current high school ===
Unlike the previous high school which covered 225,000 square feet, the current high school, located at 2720 Buffalo Way Boulevard is much larger, covering 384,000 square feet on 160 acres. The high school has 123 classrooms with the capacity of holding approximately 2,100 students. The building also has a 750-seat auditorium with a large amount of natural light. The football stadium seats 4,000 people and the gymnasium seats 2,500.

The building is subdivided into four learning academies at the high school; Academy of Trade and Health Science, Academy of Arts and Communications, Academy of Public Service and the Ninth Grade Academy. Each career academy has teachers from different subjects, who combine their efforts as a means of integrating academic and technical curriculum. Students are able to participate in different academies each year, with the ultimate purpose of better preparing them for college and careers than traditional educational systems.

== Extracurricular activities ==
The Buffaloes compete in the Western Athletic Conference and are classified as a 6A school, the largest classification in Kansas according to the Kansas State High School Activities Association. Garden City has won twenty-four state championships in various sports and non-athletic activities. The football, soccer, and track & field teams compete at Buffalo Stadium. Basketball, intramural basketball, volleyball, and wrestling take place in "The Garden", Garden City's main gymnasium. The men's and women's golf programs compete at Buffalo Dunes Golf Course and The Golf Club at Southwind. The tennis programs compete at the GCHS Tennis Complex. The baseball program competes at Clint Lightner Stadium and the softball team at the James Tangeman Sports Complex. The swim team practices at the local YMCA.

=== Athletics ===
==== Football ====
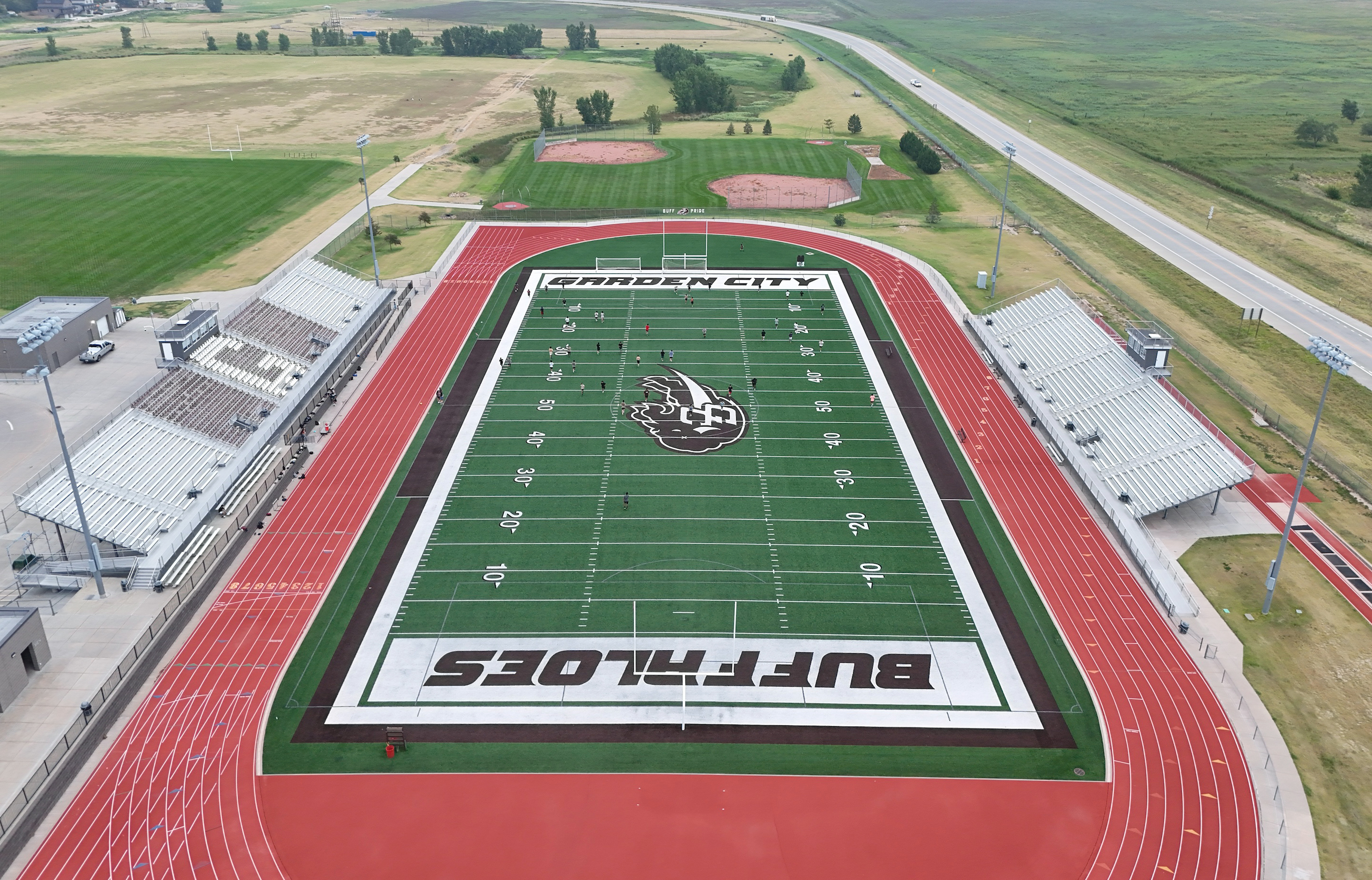
Buffalo Stadium

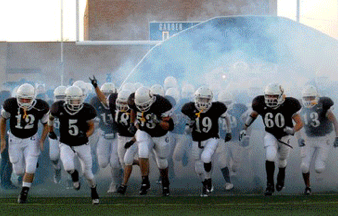
The 2009 Buffaloes running out onto the field prior to a home game

In 1961, the football team completed their first undefeated season with a 9–0 record. The football team has competed in the state championship several times, finishing runner-up in 1971, 1990, 1991 and 1998. They were finally successful in 1999. Garden City High School won the 6A state championship in football on November 20, 1999, over Olathe South High School.

As of 2009, Garden City has been named WAC champion five times, district champion thirteen times, and regional champion seven times. The football program also has produced several notable collegiate and professional athletes including former NFL pro-bowler Fum McGraw. Each year, rivals Garden City High School and Dodge City High School play an annual football game known as the "Hatchet Game." The winning team receives a decorated hatchet with an engraving of the victorious team and the year. The first Hatchet Game was played in 1938 and has been played every year since. During the 2007 Hatchet Game, junior quarterback Brodrick Smith set the school record when he rushed for 347 yards in a 42–28 win. As of the 2013 season, Garden City High School has won the "Hatchet" for 15 of the past 20 seasons. In 2012, USA Today voted the Hatchet Game as the "Greatest Rivalry in Kansas". In 2026, the school began firing a single artillery shell following touchdowns during each home game.

==== Basketball ====
Another program at Garden City High School is the men's basketball program. The Buffaloes won the state championship in 1966 and were sub-state champions in 2003. The men's basketball team has featured several notable alumni including former mayor of San Jose, California, Chuck Reed, and former Texas Longhorns' all-time leading free-throw shooter, Brandy Perryman.

==== Wrestling ====
Since Garden City High School was established, it has won eleven state championships in wrestling, occurring in 1971, 1990, 1991, 1992, 1993, 1998, 1999, 2013, 2014, 2015, and 2016. The school also finished runner-up in 2003 and 2025. As of 2025, Garden City wrestling has produced 46 individual state champions. The school also has two All-Americans in Jon Bigler in 1979 and Beth Johnson in 2008.

Wrestling USA Magazine ranked Garden City as having the 38th best high school wrestling dynasty in the 1990s out of over 38,000 high schools. Wrestling coach Rocky Welton was inducted into the Kansas Wrestling Coaches Association Hall of Fame and the National Wrestling Hall of Fame and Museum. Since its inception in 1951, the wrestling program has hosted an annual tournament which attracts some of the top wrestling programs from the central United States. Originally known as the "Garden City Invitational", the tournament was renamed the "Rocky Welton Invitational" in honor of the former coach.

Garden City was unable to win a state championship throughout the 2000s, although the Buffaloes did produce three individual state titles and an All-American. In 2006, Beth Johnson was named a Second-Team All-American and in 2008, she was named as a First-Team All-American, the first girl to do so in school history. In 2010, the Buffaloes placed fourth in the state championship, while producing two individual state champions. In 2013, the Buffaloes won the state championship for the first time since 1999, and repeated in 2014, 2015 and 2016. Also in 2016, Michael Prieto won his fourth consecutive individual state title (in four different weight classes), the first 4-time individual state champion in school history and 33rd in state history.

==== Golf ====
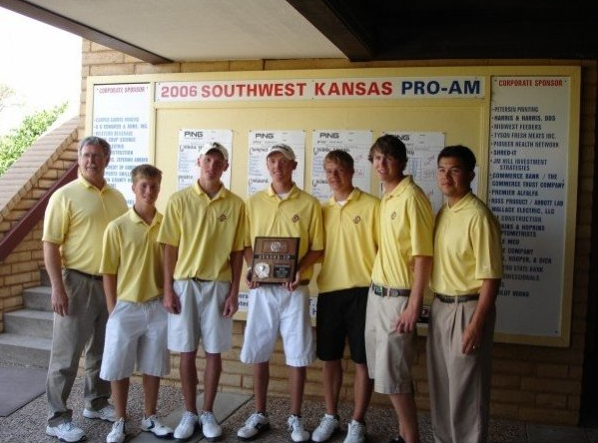
The 2007 golf team after placing 2nd at the regional tournament in Garden City, qualifying the team for the state championship.

The boys' golf program won state championships in 1977 and 1998. More recently, the boys' golf team competed at the state tournament in 2014. Additionally, the boys' and girls' programs have produced four individual state champions; Cole Wasinger in 1995, McKenzie Thayer in 2011, Sion Audrain in 2017 and 2019, and Maddix Shook in 2024. The golf programs practice and compete at The Golf Club at Southwind and Buffalo Dunes Golf Course.

==== Tennis ====
The men's and women's tennis programs have also had many successful years. The programs have remained as two of the more competitive tennis teams in the WAC for several decades. The women's program experienced their most successful season in 1994 in which they finished state runner-up. The men's program won 10 consecutive WAC championships from 1994 to 2003. In 1999, former head coach Bob Krug was named NFCA Midwest Region Coach of the Year. The streak in WAC Championships ended during the 2003–04 school year, but the Buffs rebounded and won three more consecutive WAC championships from 2005 to 2007. The Buffs added WAC Championship titles in 2011 and 2014. The tennis program has sent numerous players to the state tournament throughout the program's history.

==== Cross Country ====
The boys' cross country team won their first state championship in 2024.

==== Track and Field ====
The Buffalo track and field program has had several successes throughout its history. The Buffaloes won the state championship in 1945 and 1946. In 2003, Eric Babb won the long jump state title for the first time in the school's history. The track & field program finished runner-up in the 2006 state championship, falling to Lawrence High School by half a point. Garden City has also produced several notable athletes, including 1995 Kansas Track and Field Gatorade Athlete of the Year and state meet high-jump record-holder, Jason Archibald.

==== Bowling ====
The bowling programs at GCHS experienced success during the mid to late 2010s. The boys team won the state championship in 2016 and the girls team won a state championship in 2017. The coed team won a state championship is 2023.

=== State championships ===
State Championships
Season	Sport/Activity	Number of Championships	Year	Reference
Fall	Football	1	1999	
Fall	Cross Country, Boys	1	2024	
Fall	Debate	4	1959, 1961, 1962, 1971	
Fall	Unified Bowling	1	2023	
Winter	Wrestling, Boys	11	1971, 1990, 1991, 1992, 1993, 1998, 1999, 2013, 2014, 2015, 2016	
Winter	Wrestling, Girls	2	2025, 2026	
Winter	Basketball, Boys	1	1966	
Winter	Bowling, Boys	1	2016	
Winter	Bowling, Girls	1	2017	
Spring	Golf, Boys	2	1977, 1998	
Spring	Track and Field, Boys	2	1945, 1946	
Spring	Forensics	1	2011	
Total		28		

=== Non-athletic programs ===
==== Debate/Forensics ====
The Garden City High debate and forensics teams have been ranked among the top schools in the nation in terms of state appearances by the National Speech and Debate Association (formerly National Forensics League). Garden City High has competed at the state level in all of the NSDS events and at the national level in many of the events. It is one of the largest teams by members in the state. The debate team won the state championship in 1959, 1961, 1962, and 1971 (two-speaker). The forensics team won the state championship in 2011.

==== Journalism ====
The journalism department at GCHS is a member of the Kansas Scholastic Press Association. Established in 1910, the school newspaper, The Sugar Beet, is the oldest high school newspaper in the state of Kansas. The Sugar Beet is a frequent Columbia Scholastic Press Association Gold Medal winner and has also won the First-Place Award issued by the American Scholastic Press Association. The Sugar Beet is one of only two weekly, student-produced high school newspapers in Kansas, the other being The Mentor, which is produced by students of Manhattan High School. Beginning in 2018, the Sugar Beet changed printing locations and moved from Garden City to Hutchinson due to newspaper tariffs and trade wars. In addition, the newspaper began printing every other week instead of weekly.

==== Music ====
Garden City High School offers many music-related clubs and organizations. The first unofficial school band was organized in 1915. Garden City offers marching band, pep band, orchestra, choir, and show choir in addition to many other groups. Garden City High School's marching band, "The Marching Stampede" performs at every home football game, in parades, and in band festivals, including the WAC Band Festival, the Kansas Bandmasters Association (KBA) Marching Competition at Washburn University, and the Kansas State University Marching Festival. The band also performs during pep rallies and other school functions. The school also has a concert band that performs during the spring season.

There is also a large choir program, which includes mixed choirs, men's and women's choirs, and a modern show choir. The school also has a jazz ensemble, symphonic band, wind ensemble, and chamber and symphonic orchestras. Many of these ensembles and their members regularly participate in regional and state solo and ensemble competitions.

==== Performing arts ====
Garden City High School has a drama and stagecraft program. The school annually puts on a four performance musical in mid-November, showcasing the talent of GCHS thespians. Performances take place in O'Leary Auditorium. It has an active performance calendar that includes a fall Broadway musical with full pit orchestra, a Winter Gala featuring large performing groups, a winter play, a spring play, student directed one-act plays, showcase concerts for show choirs and jazz band, as well as the traditional large-group concerts each quarter.

The school also has cheerleading and dance competition teams. The cheerleading team performs at home football games, basketball games, wrestling events, pep rallies, and performing halftime routines as well as sideline routines during football games. The competition team, the elite division of dance team, holds tryouts every year and performs halftime routines during football and basketball games. The competition team performs several routines at various regional competitions, including pom, hip-hop, jazz, novelty, solos, and duets.

== Notable alumni ==
- Brian Babcock, gymnast
- Kendall Carl Campbell, U.S. Naval Reserve aviator, USS Kendall C. Campbell (DE-443) was named in his honor
- Constance Congdon, playwright and librettist, taught playwriting at Amherst College from 1993 to 2018 as its Playwright-in-Residence
- Mark Fox, assistant basketball coach for the Kentucky Wildcats
- Clifford R. Hope, youngest man ever chosen to serve as Speaker of the Kansas House of Representatives
- Mike Johnson, former NFL player for the Dallas Cowboys
- Gene Krug, former Major League Baseball player for the Chicago Cubs
- Bob Lewis, Kansas state representative
- Frank Mantooth, late jazz pianist and arranger
- Fum McGraw, former Colorado State athletic director, NFL Pro-Bowler, 1981 inductee into the College Football Hall of Fame
- Ross Myers, former Vice Admiral and former commander of the United States Cyber Command, Tenth Fleet
- Fred Myton, screenwriter
- Harold "Prince Hal" Patterson, former University of Kansas basketball player and member of the Canadian Football Hall of Fame
- Larry Powell, member of the Kansas House of Representatives
- Chuck Reed, former mayor of San Jose, California, 2007–2014
- Roy Romer, former governor of Colorado, 1987–1999
- Todd Tichenor, MLB umpire
- Ray Watson, American track and field athlete who competed in the 1920 Summer Olympics, in the 1924 Summer Olympics, and in the 1928 Summer Olympics
- John Wheeler, member of the Kansas House of Representatives

== See also ==
- List of high schools in Kansas
- List of unified school districts in Kansas
