= John Heavner =

American football coach

Current position
- Title: Assistant coach
- Team: Garden City Buffaloes

Playing career
- 1994–1997: East Central
- Position: Tight end

Coaching career (HC unless noted)
- 1998–2002: East Central (WR)
- 2003–2004: East Central (OC)
- 2005: Missouri State (QB)
- 2007–2011: Dordt
- 2014: Southeastern Oklahoma State (WR)
- 2015–2018: Southeastern Oklahoma State (QB/RC)
- 2019–2023: Denison HS (TX) (assistant)
- 2024: Madill HS (OK)
- 2025–present: Garden City HS (KS) (assistant)

Head coaching record
- Overall: 7–44 (college); 1–9 (high school)

John Heavner is an American football coach. He served as the head football coach at Dordt College in Sioux Center, Iowa from 2007 to 2011, compiling a record of 7–44.

== Head coaching record ==
=== College ===
Year	Team	Overall	Conference	Standing	Bowl/playoffs
Dordt Defenders (NAIA Independent) (2007)
2007	Dordt	3–5			
Dordt Defenders (Great Plains Athletic Conference) (2008–2011)
2008	Dordt	1–10	1–9	T–11th	
2009	Dordt	1–10	0–10	T–11th	
2010	Dordt	0–10	0–10	11th	
2011	Dordt	2–9	0–9	10th	
Dordt:		7–44	1–38		
Total:		7–44			

=== High school ===
Year	Team	Overall	Conference	Standing	Bowl/playoffs
Madill Wildcats (Oklahoma 4A District 2) (2024)
2024	Madill	1–9	0–6	8th	
Madill:		1–9	0–6		
Total:		1–9			
