= USS Campbell =

USS Campbell may refer to more than one United States Navy ship

- USS George M. Campbell (DE-773), a destroyer escort cancelled in 1944
- USS Joseph E. Campbell (DE-70), a destroyer escort in commission from 1943 to 1946
- USS Kendall C. Campbell (DE-443), a destroyer escort in commission from 1944 to 1946
