= Mike Johnson (cornerback) =

American football player (1943–2003)

No. 23
- Position: Cornerback

Personal information
- Born: October 7, 1943; Denver, Colorado, U.S.
- Died: March 19, 2003 (aged 59)
- Listed height: 5 ft 11 in (1.80 m)
- Listed weight: 184 lb (83 kg)

Career information
- High school: Garden City (KS)
- College: Kansas
- AFL draft: 1966: 14th round, 125th overall pick

Career history
- Dallas Cowboys (1966–1969); Chicago Bears (1970)*
- * Offseason or practice squad member only

Career NFL statistics
- Games played - started: 54 - 28
- Interceptions: 8
- Stats at Pro Football Reference

Michael Alan Johnson (October 7, 1943 – March 19, 2003) was an American professional football cornerback in the National Football League (NFL) for the Dallas Cowboys. He was selected by the Oakland Raiders in the 14th round of the 1966 AFL draft after playing college football at the University of Kansas.

== Early life and college ==
Johnson was born on October 7, 1943, in Denver, Colorado. He attended Garden City High School before moving on to the University of Kansas, where he was a part of the same offensive backfield as Gale Sayers. Injuries affected his production in college, including as a senior, when he was going to be the featured running back.

== Professional career ==
Johnson was selected by the Oakland Raiders in the 14th round (125th overall) of the 1966 AFL draft. He chose to sign with the NFL's Dallas Cowboys as a free agent in 1966. He was converted into a defensive back, based on how the Cowboys saw him tackle on special teams in college. As a rookie, besides playing special teams, he was also used as a linebacker, when the other teams employed their two-minute offense.

In 1967, he passed Warren Livingston on the depth chart for the right cornerback starting position and finished with 5 interceptions.

In 1968, he registered 3 interceptions, but was back on the bench after Dick Daniels was moved to safety and Mel Renfro to right cornerback.

In 1969, he lost his starting job to Phil Clark.

On August 3, 1970, he was traded to the Chicago Bears in exchange for a draft choice (not exercised). He was released on September 8.

== Death ==
Johnson died on March 19, 2003, at the age of 59.
