= Eufaula, Oklahoma =

Eufaula, Oklahoma Yofalv (Creek)
- City
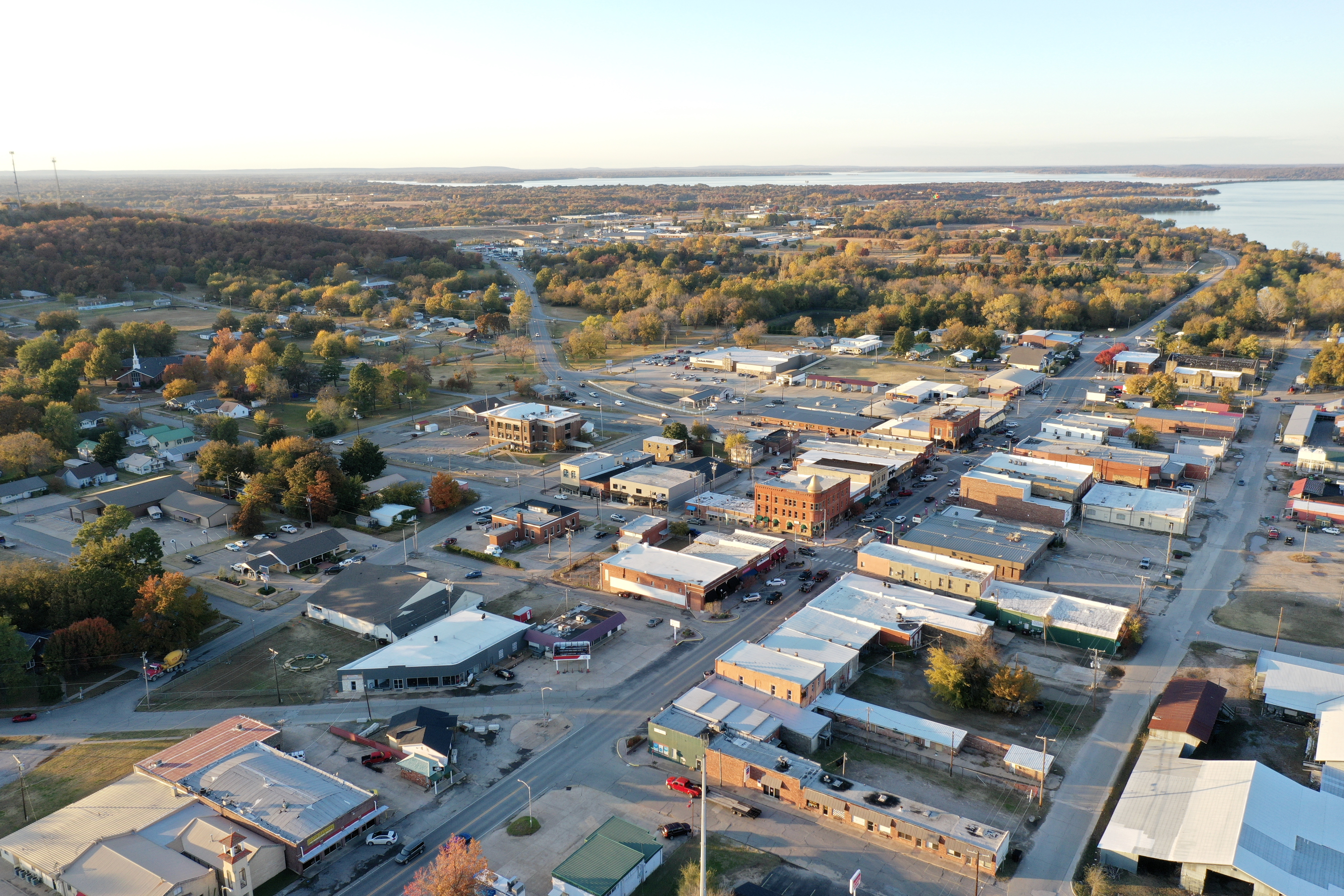
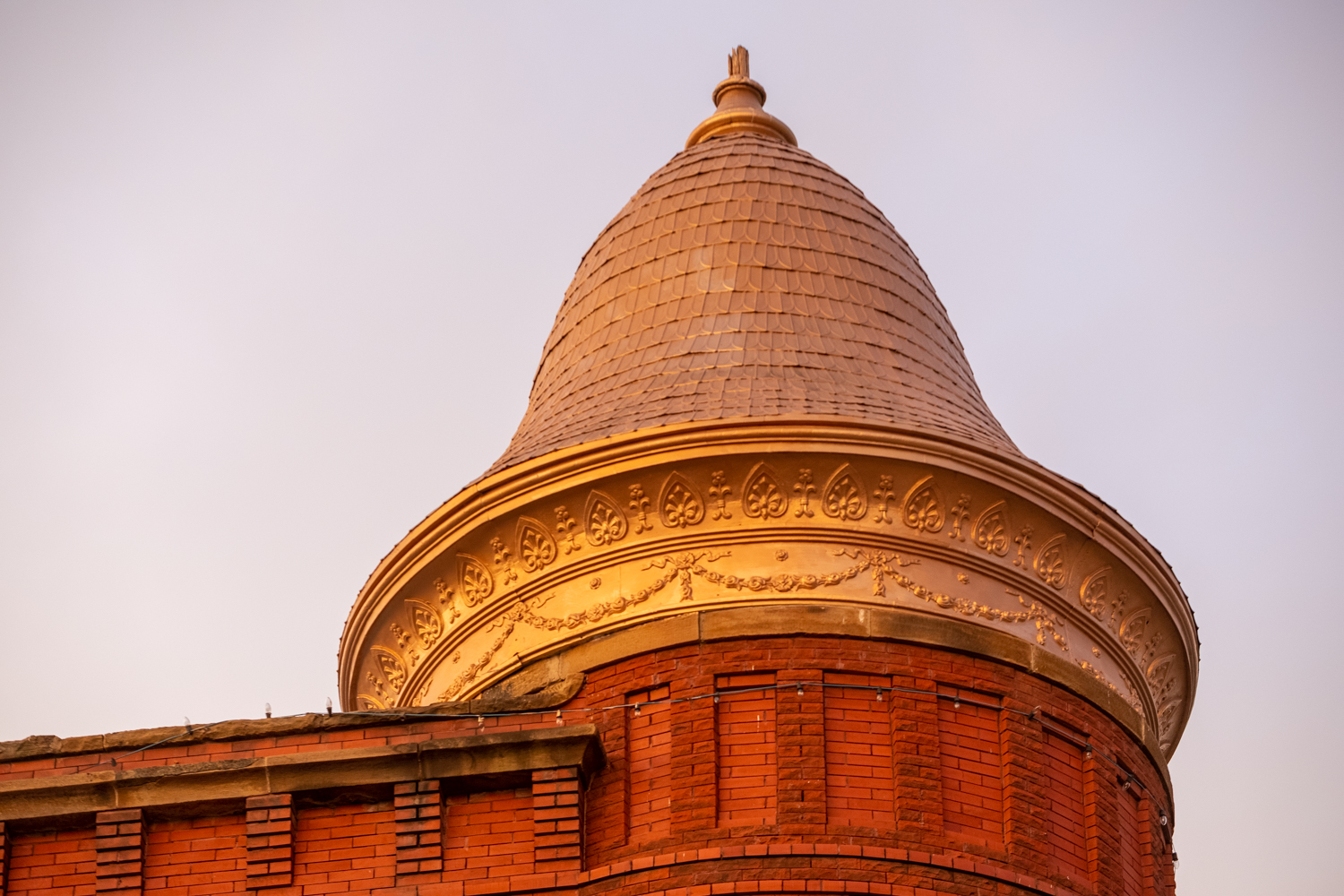
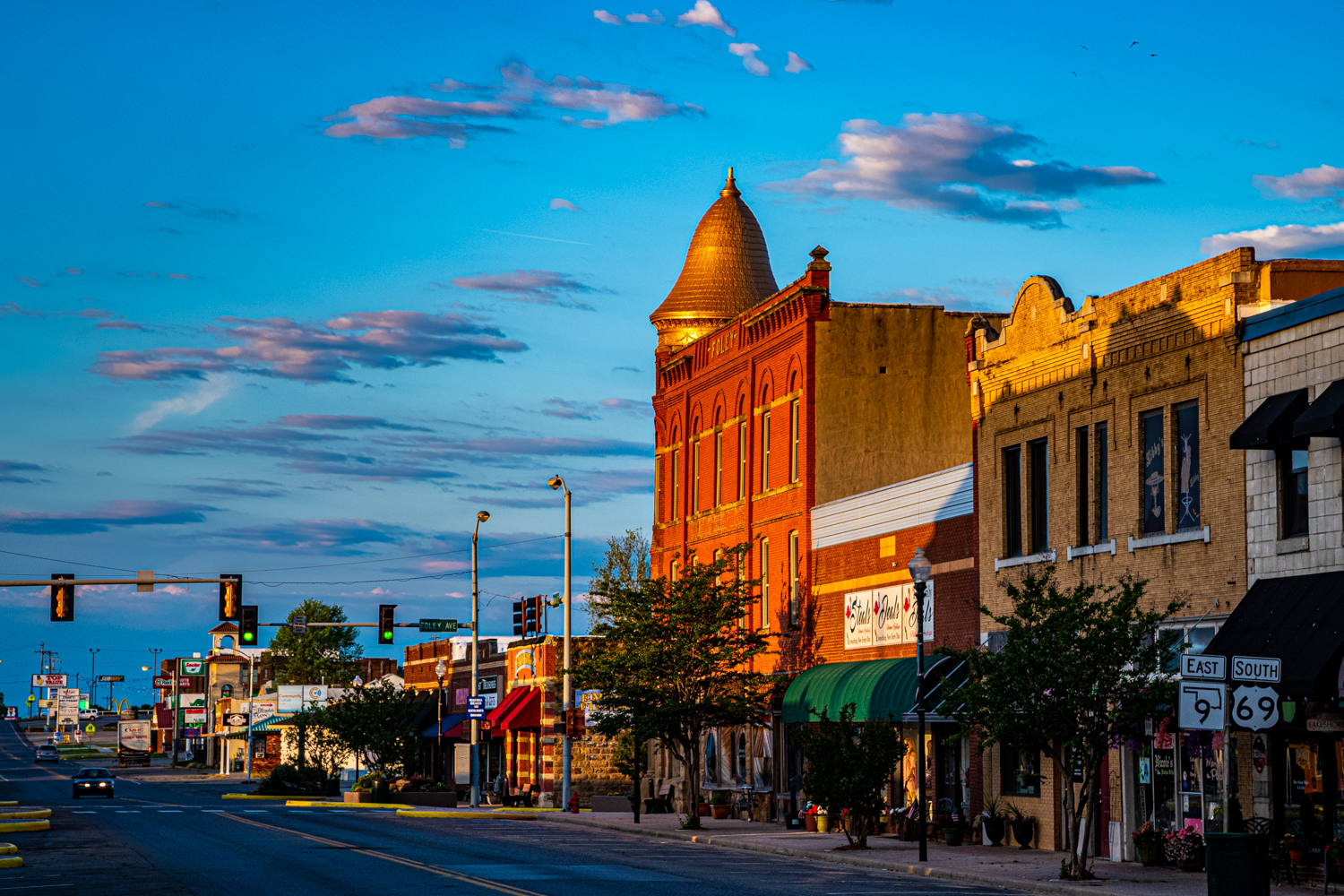
- Images of Eufaula. Left to right by row: Aerial view of Eufaula, Foley Building dome, Historic Downtown Eufaula

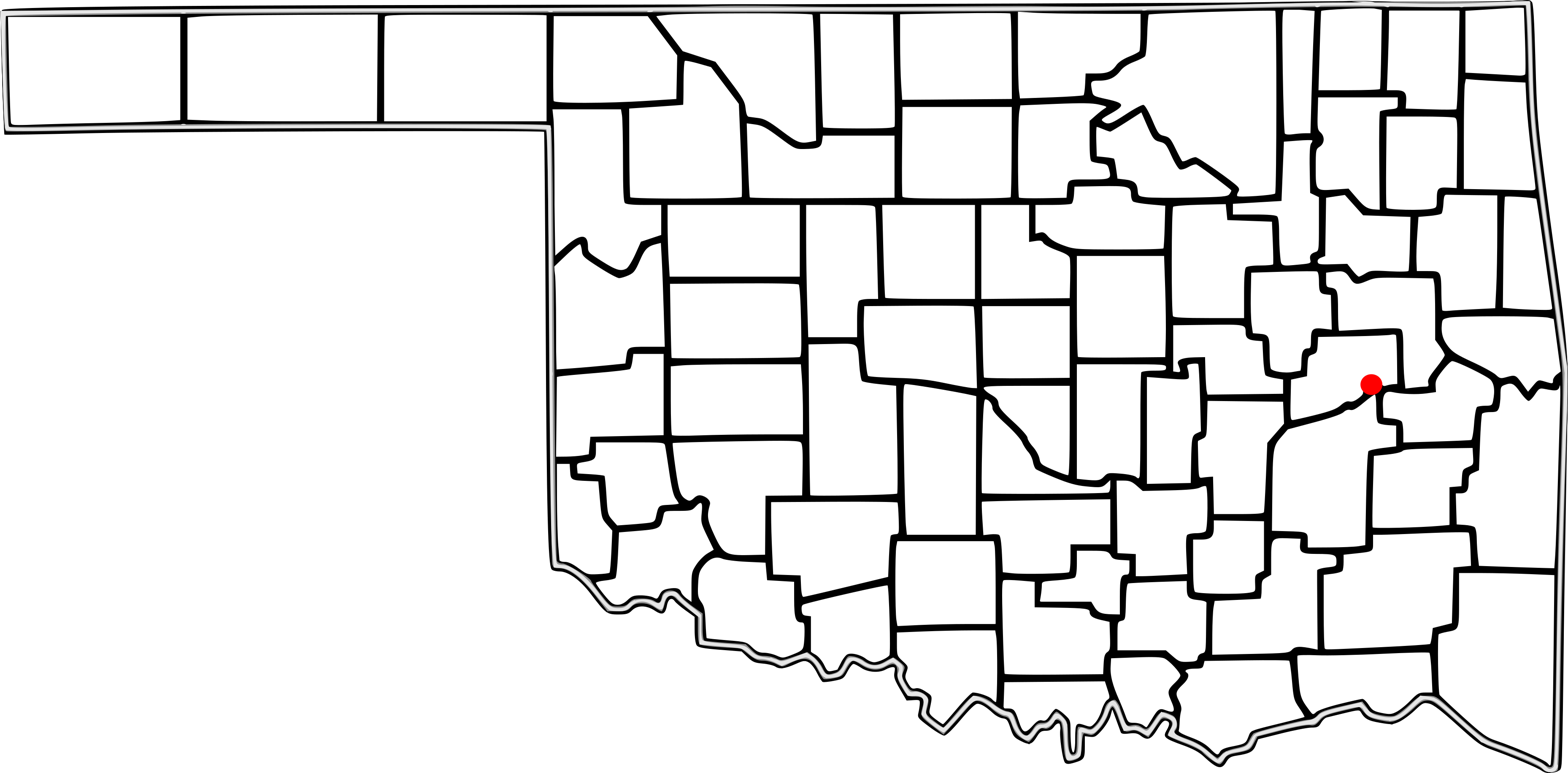
- Location in Oklahoma

- Location in the United States
- Coordinates: 35°17′32″N 95°35′11″W
- Country: United States
- State: Oklahoma
- County: McIntosh

Government
  - Mayor: James Hickman
  - Vice Mayor: Tisha Morgan
  - Council members: Roger Barton; Evelyn Gulley; J. Mason Dobbs

Area
  - Total: 9.63 sq mi (24.94 km^{2})
  - Land: 6.59 sq mi (17.07 km^{2})
  - Water: 3.04 sq mi (7.87 km^{2})
- Elevation: 610 ft (190 m)

Population (2020)
  - Total: 2,766
  - Density: 420/sq mi (162/km^{2})
- Time zone: UTC-06:00 (CST)
  - Summer (DST): UTC-05:00 (CDT)
- ZIP Code: 74432
- Area codes: 539/918
- FIPS code: 40-24650
- GNIS feature ID: 2410459
- Website: cityofeufaulaok.com

Eufaula (Note: /juˈfɔːlə/ yoo-FAW-lə; Creek: Yofalv, yofá:la, Creek pronunciation: [jofɑ́ːlə].) is a city in and the county seat of McIntosh County, Oklahoma, United States. The population was 2,766 at the 2020 census. It is in the southern part of the county, north of McAlester and south of Muskogee.

The name "Eufaula" comes from the Eufaula people, part of the Muscogee Creek confederacy. The town and county are within the jurisdiction of the federally recognized Muscogee Nation, descendants of the tribe who were removed here from the Southeastern United States in the 1830s.

== History ==
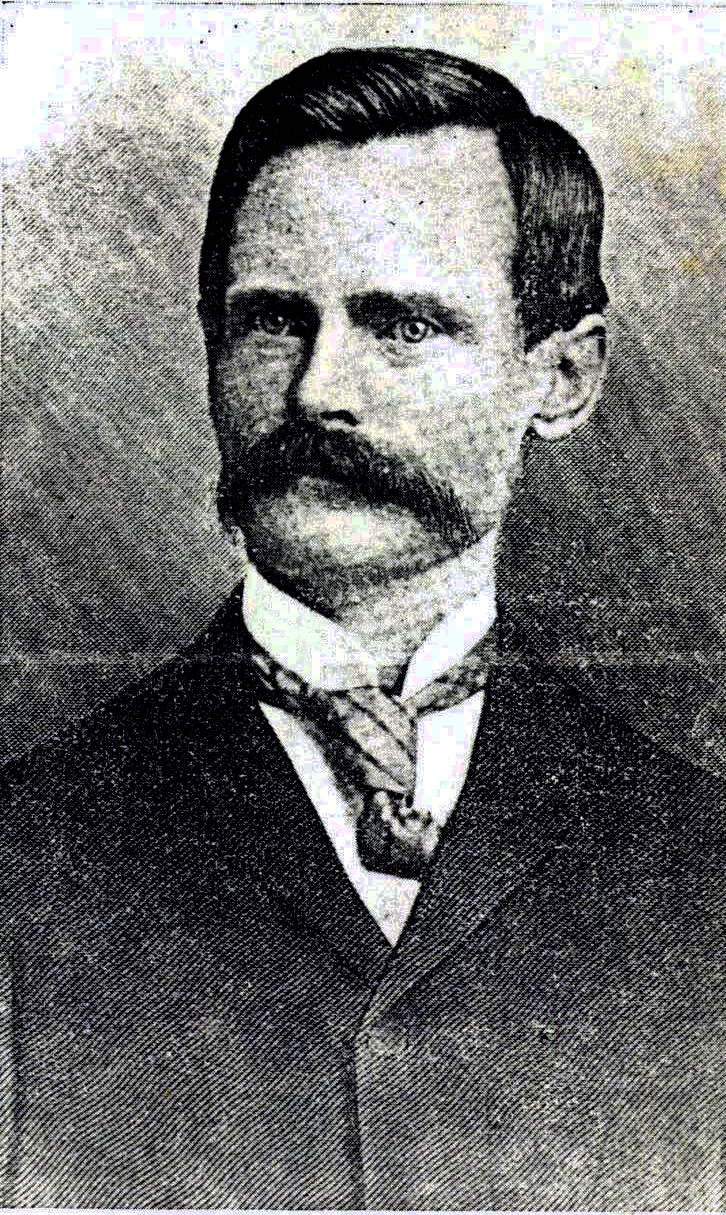
C. E. Foley

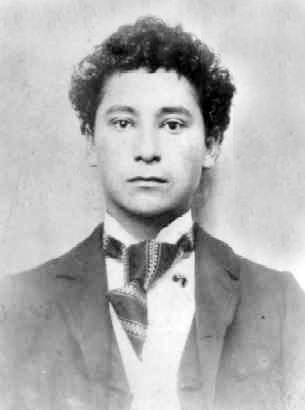
Alexander Posey

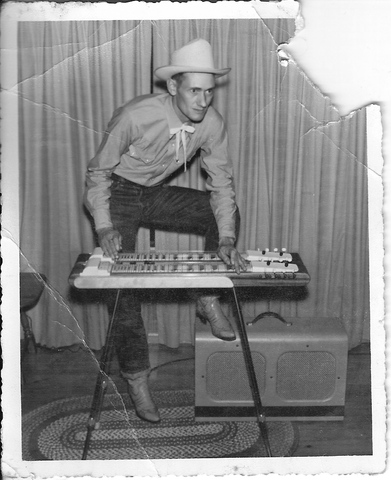
Harmon Davis playing steel guitar

In the Southeast, the Muscogee people (then known as Creek by European Americans) occupied a large territory including much of present-day Georgia and Alabama. By 1800, the Creek had a village named Eufala, located on Eufaula Creek, near what later developed as the present site of Talladega, Alabama. This was one of a group called their Upper Creek towns. Pickett's History of Alabama mentions an Indian town, belonging to the Creek, which he calls Eufaulahatche. "Little Eufauly" is mentioned by an historian of this period as early as 1792. Another Upper Creek town called Eufaula was located on the Tallapoosa River; the present town of Dadeville, Alabama, developed near there.

The Lower Creek had two villages of similar names: Eufaula on the Chattahoochee River, in what later became Henry County, Alabama; and Eufala, located on the east bank of the Chattahoochee River, within the limits of present Quitman County, Georgia.

In 1832 the U.S. government had forced the Creek to move to Indian Territory and cede their lands in the Southeastern United States, as part of a series of cessions they had made. They established Eufaula as a center of the Creek in their new territory. It was a frequent meeting place of the people, who held pow-wows or Indian conferences in that vicinity during the early days of Creek settlement.

In the 1870s G. W. Grayson, then Chief of the Creek, his brother Samuel, George Stidham and other Creek leaders, persuaded the Missouri-Kansas-Texas Railway (known as the KATY) to locate one of its stations at this site. The older Creek village was moved here to take advantage of the railroad.

Eufaula, Indian Territory (present-day Oklahoma), began to attract European Americans soon after the KATY railroad established a station here in 1872. The town was named after George W. Ingall, US Indian agent for the Five Civilized Tribes, suggested the name Eufaula, after the earlier Muscogee tribal town in Alabama. Eufaula incorporated as a town in Indian Territory by 1898.

D. B. Whitlow and Joseph Coody established the first store on the west side of the railroad. The Graysons and G. E. Seales started a store on the east side about the same time. Dr. W. H. Bailey was the first physician and druggist to locate in the new town. Rev. R. C. McGee, a Presbyterian missionary, established one of the first churches in Eufaula. He served there as minister for many years. For years before the American Civil War, the Asbury Mission School, located two miles northeast of Eufaula, was the leading educational institution of that vicinity. It was burned in an accidental fire.

== 20th century to present ==
After Oklahoma was admitted as a state, Eufaula was part of the newly organized McIntosh County. The residents of Eufaula were involved in a dispute with nearby Checotah, in what was known as the McIntosh County Seat War, during 1907 and 1909. The legislature had designated Checotah as the new county seat, but the people of Eufaula refused to hand over the county records. Soon after, a group of heavily armed men from Checotah tried to seize the records from the courthouse in Eufaula, but were beaten back and forced to surrender during a gunfight. One year later, Eufaula was designated as the permanent seat of McIntosh County.

=== Education ===
The European-American settlers of Eufaula built a school on the east side of the railroad, and established a free school by voluntary taxation. When the Curtis Act was passed by Congress, Eufaula levied taxes and started to build their public school system, and to make other needed public improvements. In the early 20th century, the city had paved streets, a splendid "White Way," five brick-and-stone schoolhouses, seven churches, a large cotton oil mill, light and ice plant, business blocks, three parks, a waterworks and sewage system, four banks, two hotels, the three-story brick boarding school for Creek Nation girls, and an abundance of natural gas for domestic and commercial purposes. A civic club worked to improve the town.

=== Jefferson Highway Bridge ===
When the Jefferson Highway was first constructed through Eufaula, travelers and trade vehicles could cross the South Canadian River, about four miles below the town, only by ferry. The citizens of Eufaula incorporated The Jefferson Highway Bridge Company, and constructed the Jefferson Highway Bridge, at a cost of almost a quarter of a million dollars. When built, the bridge was the most expensive constructed on the Jefferson Highway between Winnipeg, Canada and New Orleans. It opened for use April 21, 1920. The bridge is now long gone, and the site of the bridge has changed with the building of Lake Eufaula.

=== Eufaula Business District ===
The historic Eufaula Business District is on the National Register of Historic Places. The district is officially described as the "Area within Lots 89, 90, 100, 101, 102 on Main Street between Pine and Grand Streets."

=== McIntosh County Courthouse ===
The McIntosh County Courthouse at 110 N. First Street is also on the National Register of Historic Places. The three-story, red brick building with the second floor entryway is said to be significant because it is a good example of the functional architectural design used for numerous public buildings in the state.

=== Other NRHP sites ===
Other NRHP sites in Eufaula include the C.L. Cooper Building, the Eufaula Armory, and the First Soil Conservation District Dedication Site.

== Geography ==
Eufaula is in southern McIntosh County and is bordered to the northeast by Eufaula Lake, a reservoir on the Canadian River. The city sits along an arm of the lake formed by the North Canadian River, which joins the Canadian River 2 miles (3 km) to the southeast.

U.S. Route 69, a four-lane freeway, passes through the city west of downtown. The highway leads north 36 miles (58 km) to Muscogee and south 28 miles (45 km) to McAlester. Checotah is 14 miles (23 km) to the north via US-69. Oklahoma State Highway 9 passes through the center of Eufaula, leading east 23 miles (37 km) to Whitefield and west 40 miles (64 km) to Wetumka.

According to the U.S. Census Bureau, the city of Eufaula has a total area of 9.6 square miles (25 km^{2}), of which 6.6 square miles (17 km^{2}) are land and 3.0 square miles (7.8 km^{2}), or 31.55%, are water.

== Demographics ==
Historical population
Census	Pop.	Note	%±
1900	757		—
1910	1,307		72.7%
1920	2,286		74.9%
1930	2,073		−9.3%
1940	2,355		13.6%
1950	2,540		7.9%
1960	2,382		−6.2%
1970	2,355		−1.1%
1980	3,159		34.1%
1990	2,652		−16.0%
2000	2,639		−0.5%
2010	2,813		6.6%
2020	2,766		−1.7%
U.S. Decennial Census

=== 2020 census ===
As of the 2020 census, Eufaula had a population of 2,766. The median age was 47.3 years. 20.4% of residents were under the age of 18 and 26.9% of residents were 65 years of age or older. For every 100 females there were 85.8 males, and for every 100 females age 18 and over there were 84.2 males age 18 and over.

0% of residents lived in urban areas, while 100.0% lived in rural areas.

There were 1,152 households in Eufaula, of which 27.2% had children under the age of 18 living in them. Of all households, 35.3% were married-couple households, 19.7% were households with a male householder and no spouse or partner present, and 38.3% were households with a female householder and no spouse or partner present. About 35.6% of all households were made up of individuals and 20.8% had someone living alone who was 65 years of age or older.

There were 1,507 housing units, of which 23.6% were vacant. Among occupied housing units, 60.0% were owner-occupied and 40.0% were renter-occupied. The homeowner vacancy rate was 4.0% and the rental vacancy rate was 12.8%.

Racial composition as of the 2020 census
Race	Percent
White	65.6%
Black or African American	6.4%
American Indian and Alaska Native	15.7%
Asian	0.3%
Native Hawaiian and Other Pacific Islander	0%
Some other race	0.4%
Two or more races	11.6%
Hispanic or Latino (of any race)	2.7%

=== 2000 census ===
As of the 2000 census, there were 2,639 people, 1,150 households, and 663 families residing in the city. The population density was 397.8 inhabitants per square mile (153.6/km^{2}). There were 1,468 housing units at an average density of 221.3 per square mile (85.4/km^{2}). The racial makeup of the city was 66.46% White, 17.92% Native American, 7.43% African American, 1.21% Hispanic or Latino of any race, 0.30% Asian, 0.04% Pacific Islander, 0.27% from other races. Respondents of two or more races represented 7.58% of the population.

There were 1,150 households, out of which 21.3% had children under the age of 18 living with them, 41.1% were married couples living together, 13.3% had a female householder with no husband present, and 42.3% were non-families. 38.4% of all households were made up of individuals, and 25.0% had someone living alone who was 65 years of age or older. The average household size was 2.16 and the average family size was 2.85.

In the city, the population was spread out, with 20.8% under the age of 18, 6.7% from 18 to 24, 20.0% from 25 to 44, 23.2% from 45 to 64, and 29.2% who were 65 years of age or older. The median age was 47 years. For every 100 females, there were 81.4 males. For every 100 females age 18 and over, there were 75.8 males.

The median income for a household in the city was $20,547, and the median income for a family was $28,871. Males had a median income of $25,673 versus $19,405 for females. The per capita income for the city was $15,521. About 20.9% of families and 27.6% of the population were below the poverty line, including 45.4% of those under age 18 and 17.8% of those age 65 or over.

== Parks and recreation ==
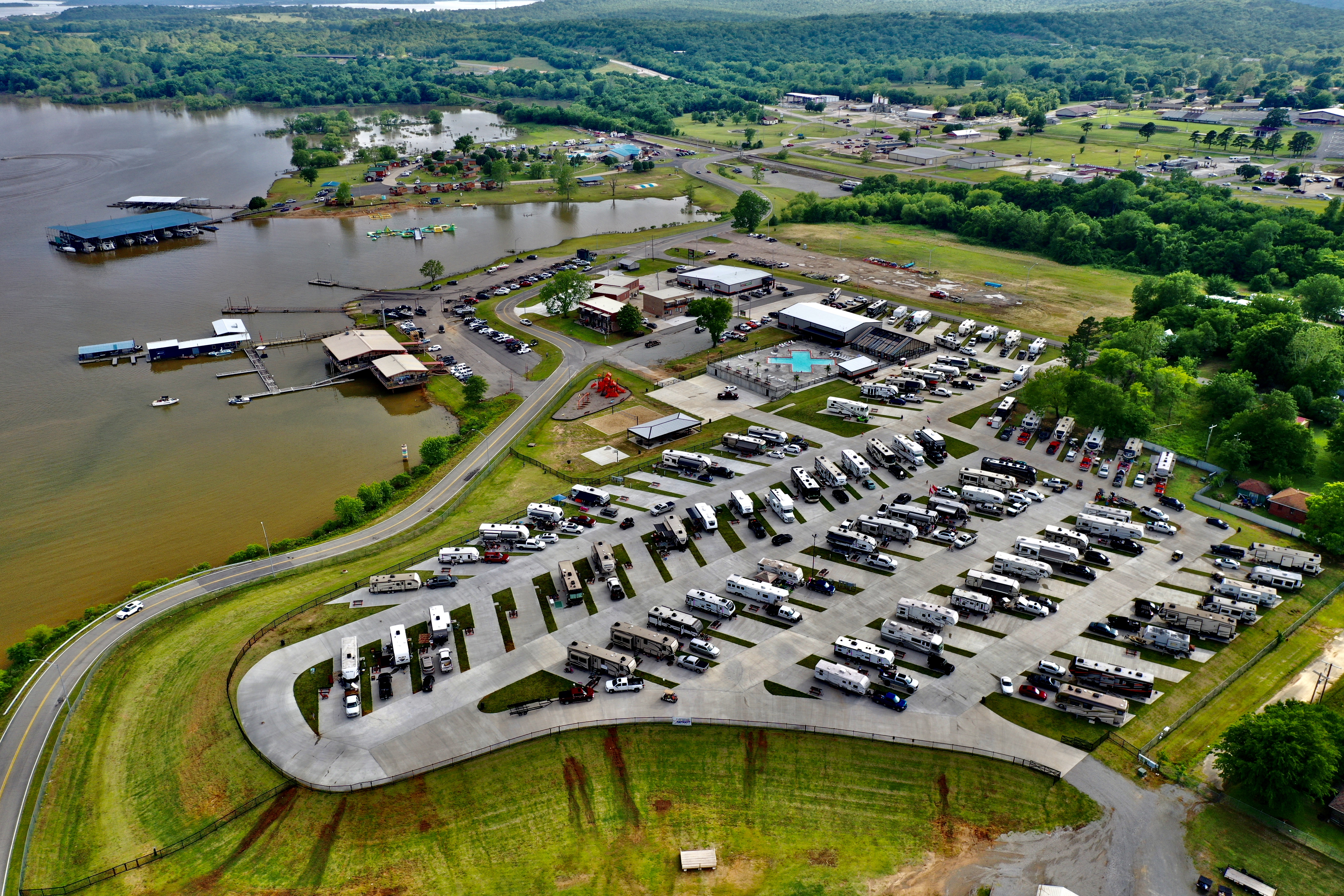
Xtreme RV Resort - Eufaula, OK

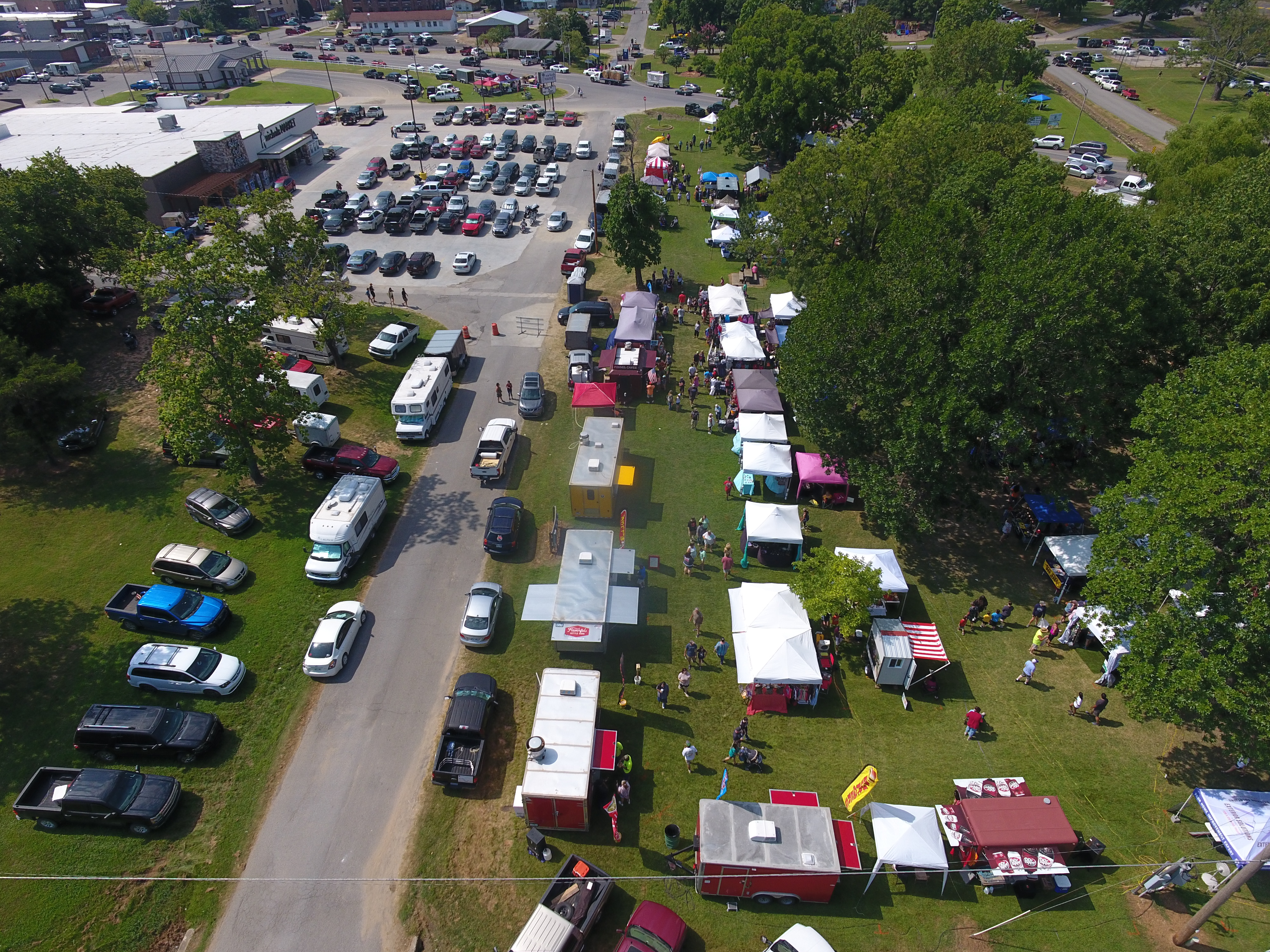
Whole Hawg Days - Eufaula, OK

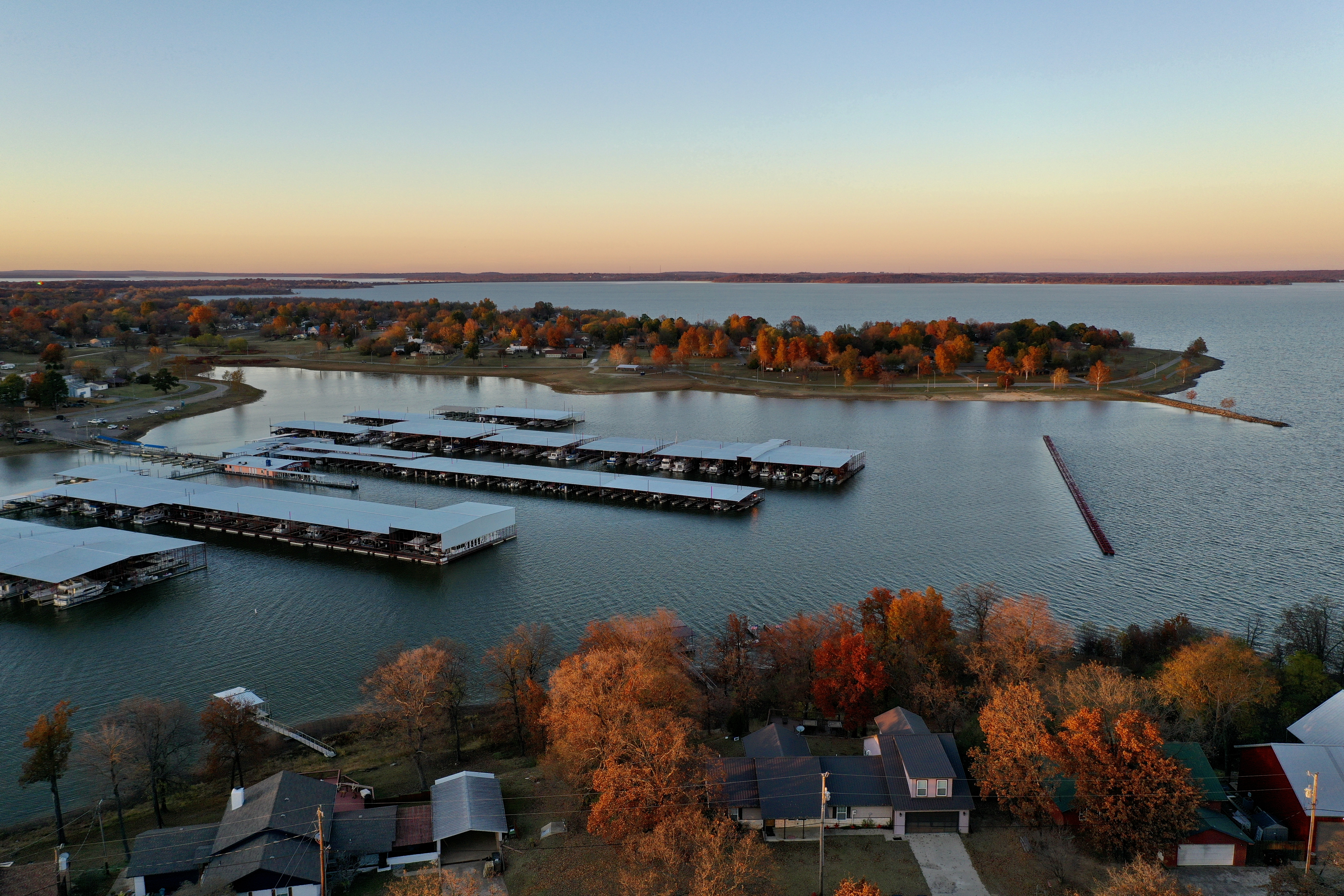
Eufaula Cove Marina - Eufaula, OK

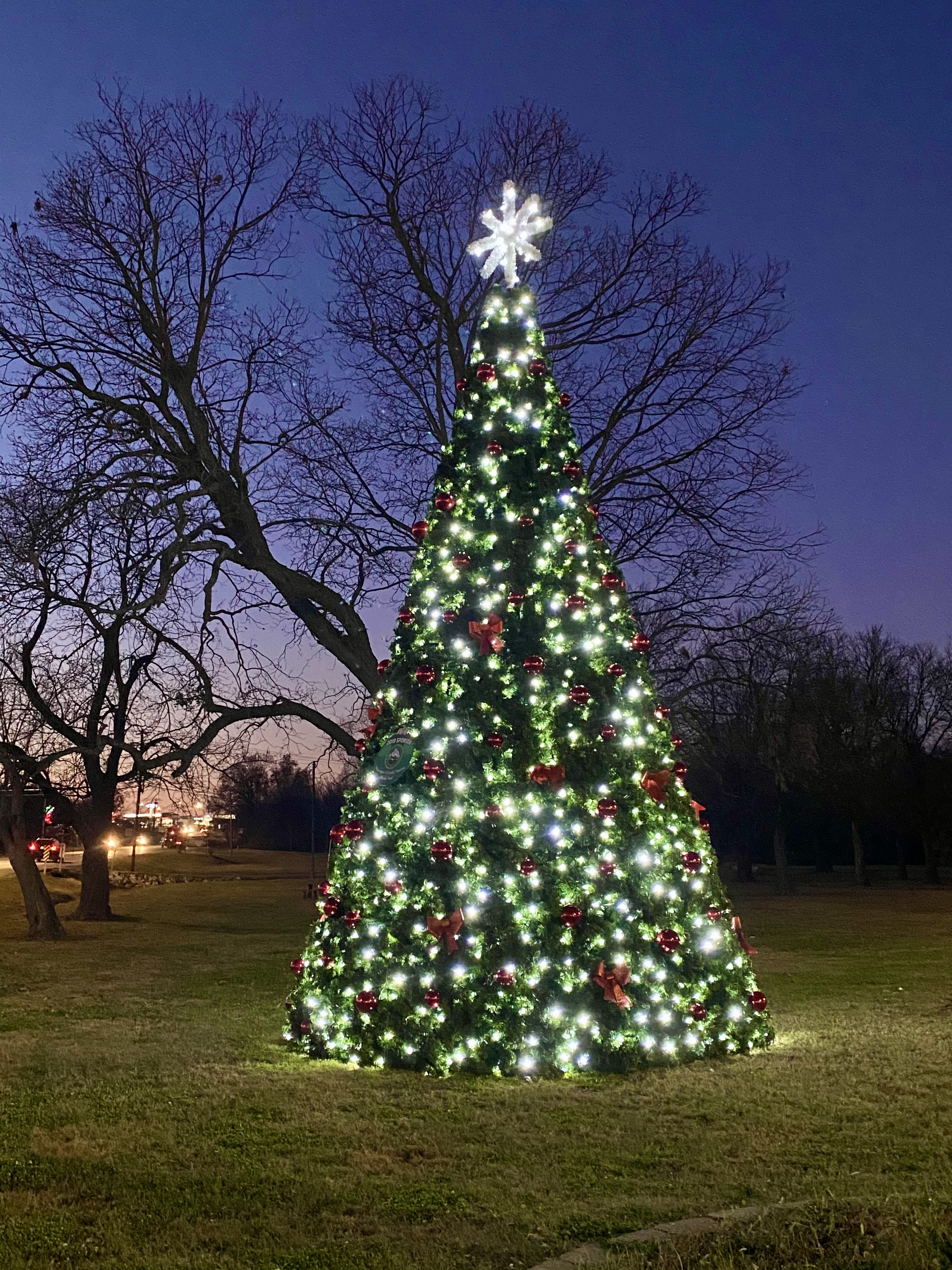
Christmas Tree - Eufaula, OK

Lake Eufaula, created by Eufaula Dam and Oklahoma's largest lake contained entirely within the state of Oklahoma, is right next to town. Standing Rock, a historical monument, became submerged after the area behind the dam was flooded.

Eufaula Parks & Recreation facilities include Old Creek Town Park, which has a playground and pavilions, and the Eufaula Community Center, which has multiple meeting rooms and a pool.

The City of Eufaula hosts an annual 4 July fireworks show on Lake Eufaula.

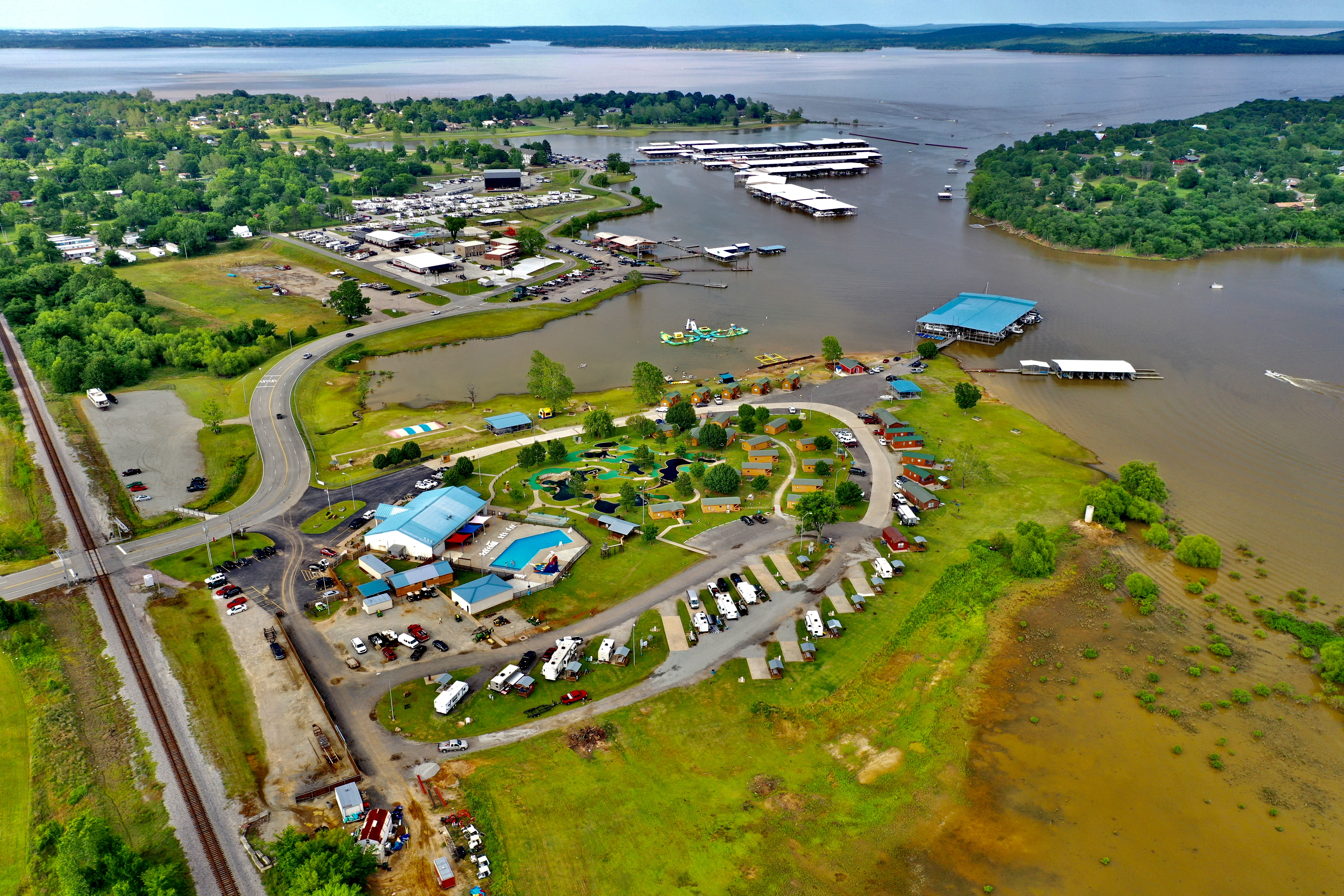
Jellystone Park - Eufaula, OK

== Media ==
The first issue of the Indian Journal, now The Eufaula Indian Journal, was published in 1876; it is the oldest continuously published newspaper in Oklahoma. Noted people who worked for the Indian Journal include Alexander Posey, who was editor and also published his Fus Fixico Letters in the early 1900s, commenting on Creek Nation and Indian Territory politics. This was the only daily Indian newspaper at the time.

== Transportation ==
Eufaula is served by U.S. Route 69 and Oklahoma State Highway 9.

Eufaula is in the 10-county region served by the KI BOIS Area Transit System ("KATS"), a low-cost public bus/van service established in 1983 to help poorer communities, primarily in southeast Oklahoma, by providing access to Senior Citizen centers, groceries, medical services, and jobs.

The Eufaula Municipal Airport, Airport ID #Fo8, was established in 1965 and is designated as a Federal Aviation Authority. The runway is asphalt, 3,000 feet long and 60 feet wide, with flight availability for small aircraft, helicopters, and ultra light aircraft.

== Notable people ==
- Tsianina Redfeather Blackstone (Muscogee/Cherokee), internationally known singer and performer, and later Indian activist; born and raised in Eufaula
- Hurshul Clothier, big band and country musician
- George W. Grayson (Muscogee), Chief of the Creek Nation, 1917 to 1920; born in Eufaula. College educated, he served as an interpreter, was a businessman and power broker, serving for several terms on the Creek Nation Council. He was the Creek delegate to Congress.
- Jamison family, high-profile unsolved murders
- Donna J. Nelson, University of Oklahoma chemistry professor, 2016 American Chemical Society president, and science advisor to Breaking Bad
- Alexander Posey, poet, writer and editor, wrote for the Indian Journal. For several years he served as superintendent of the Creek Boarding School at Eufaula.
- Clyde Stacy, rockabilly singer

=== Sports ===
- Andy Livingston, football player for the Chicago Bears and New Orleans Saints
- Warren Livingston, football player for the Dallas Cowboys
- Dewey Selmon, played football for the University of Oklahoma, Tampa Bay Buccaneers and San Diego Chargers; born and raised in Eufaula
- Lee Roy Selmon, football for the University of Oklahoma and Tampa Bay Buccaneers
- Lucious Selmon, played college football for the University of Oklahoma and professionally in the World Football League
- J. C. Watts, played college football for the Oklahoma Sooners and professionally in the CFL; later served four terms as a member of the U.S. House of Representatives
