= Don Bishop =

American football player (1934–1998)

No. 85, 28, 45, 44
- Position: Cornerback

Personal information
- Born: July 1, 1934; Rawlings, Virginia, U.S.
- Died: November 13, 1998 (aged 64)
- Listed height: 6 ft 2 in (1.88 m)
- Listed weight: 209 lb (95 kg)

Career information
- High school: Jefferson (CA)
- College: LA City College
- NFL draft: 1958: undrafted

Career history
- Pittsburgh Steelers (1958–1959); Chicago Bears (1959); Dallas Cowboys (1960–1965)

Awards and highlights
- Pro Bowl (1962); NJCAA All-American (1957); 2× All-Western State Conference (1953, 1957)

Career NFL statistics
- Interceptions: 22
- Fumble recoveries: 6
- Total touchdowns: 1
- Stats at Pro Football Reference

Donald William Bishop (July 1, 1934 – November 13, 1998) was an American professional football cornerback in the National Football League (NFL) for the Pittsburgh Steelers, Chicago Bears and Dallas Cowboys. He played college football at Los Angeles City College.

== Early life ==
Bishop was born on July 1, 1934, in Rawlings, Virginia. He attended Jefferson High School, where he competed in football and baseball.

He enrolled at Los Angeles City College, where he was a two-way end.

In 1953, he received All-Western State Conference honors. He spent two years out of football while serving his military service.

He returned in 1957 and was named the starter a left end. He received All-Western State Conference and Junior College All-American honors.

== Professional career ==
=== Pittsburgh Steelers ===
Bishop was signed as an undrafted free agent by the Pittsburgh Steelers after the 1958 NFL draft on January 29. He was tried at split end and as a halfback, catching only 3 passes in his rookie season. In his second year, he was used at defensive halfback and punt returner, but was released after 2 games on October 12, because of poor performances.

=== Chicago Bears ===
The Chicago Bears claimed him off waivers during the 1959 season, but played him in only one game.

=== Dallas Cowboys ===
On September 6, 1960, the expansion Dallas Cowboys claimed him off waivers. Bishop was switched to cornerback and during the Cowboys' 1960 inaugural year, he became the franchise first starting right cornerback, registering 71 tackles, 13 passes defensed and 3 interceptions in a 12-game season, tying him with Tom Franckhauser for the team lead.

In 1961, he began to stand out, finishing with 8 interceptions in a 14-game season, including 6 in the first five contests. He trailed league leader Dick Lynch by one. Only Everson Walls (twice), Mel Renfro (once), Trevon Diggs (once), and DaRon Bland (once), have had more interceptions in a season for the Cowboys. He also established a team record that stood until 2021, with five consecutive games with an interception. Bishop did not make the Pro Bowl, but was named to the Sporting News first-team All-NFL team.

In 1962, he had 6 interceptions and also scored his lone career touchdown, returning an interception 84 yards in a loss to the Los Angeles Rams. After missing the Pro Bowl the previous season, Bishop was one of the first Cowboys players ever to receive this honor. In the Pro Bowl, he recovered an Abe Woodson kickoff fumble, returning it 20 yards untouched for the final score in a 30–20 win.

In 1963, he recorded 5 interceptions, making him the Cowboys leader in interceptions during their first four years of existence. He suffered a knee injury in the sixth game against the New York Giants.

The knee injury forced him to have surgery before the 1964 season, which would limit him the rest of his career. He started 7 games at right cornerback, while alternating with Warren Livingston.

In 1965, he was a backup behind Livingston. He retired at the end of the 1966 season.

Bishop played 9 seasons in the NFL, leaving as the Cowboys career interceptions leader. His 22 interceptions rank eleventh on the current franchise career interceptions list. Although he played on some of the Cowboys worst teams, he became one of their original defensive stars.

== Personal life ==
Bishop at one point worked as a morticians' assistant during the off-season.
