= John Wheeler (Kansas politician) =

American politician

Member of the Kansas House of Representatives from the 123rd district
- In office January 9, 2017 – January 9, 2023
- Preceded by: John Doll
- Succeeded by: Bob Lewis

Personal details
- Born: August 6, 1947 (age 79) Garden City, Kansas, U.S.
- Party: Republican
- Education: Fort Hays State University; Washburn University School of Law
- Profession: Attorney

John P. Wheeler Jr. (born August 6, 1947) is an American politician. He served as a Republican member of the Kansas House of Representatives for the 123rd district from 2017 to 2023.

== Biography ==
=== Early life ===
John Wheeler was born in 1947 and grew up in Garden City, Kansas. He graduated from Garden City High School in 1965. After high school, he served in the United States Air Force from 1969 to 1973, receiving the Air Force Commendation Medal. He received his bachelor's degree from Fort Hays State University and his JD from Washburn University School of Law in 1976 where he graduated cum laude.

=== Legal career ===
Shortly after graduation, he member of the Federal District Court of the State of Kansas and as a member of the Kansas Supreme Court in 1976. In 1978, he served as a member of the Tenth Circuit Court of Appeals. Also during this time, he was an associate at Calihan, Green, Calihan and Loyd from 1976 to 1979. He then worked at Soldner and Wheeler as a partner from 1979 to 1987. From 1988 to 1992, he practiced as an attorney at law/sole practitioner. In 1993 he was elected as the county attorney and served that position until his retirement in 2013.

=== Politics ===
Following retirement from his law practice, he ran for and was elected as a member of the Kansas House of Representatives for the 123rd district. In March 2018, he voted to reject legalizing marijuana. He has served on the Judiciary, Transportation, and the Veterans, Military and Homeland Security committees. He also served as a member of the Kansas Supreme Court Budget Advisory Council in 2013 and a member of the Kansas Supreme Court Blue Ribbon Commission from 2010 to 2012. In March 2018, Wheeler rejected legalizing marijuana.

On March 23, 2022, at the swearing in of the first Indigenous Kansas state representative, Ponka-We Victors, Rep. Wheeler commented that he wanted to make sure she was using a gavel and not a tomahawk. Rep. Wheeler later apologized to Rep. Victors who did not accept his apology and called for accountability.

== Personal life ==
He has been a lifelong Republican. His hobbies include golfing, singing and reading. His favorite movies are When Harry Met Sally... and My Cousin Vinny.

== Honors and awards ==
- Air Force Commendation Medal
- Graduated cum laude from Washburn University School of Law
- Inducted into the GCHS Hall of Fame in 2016
