= Hurshul Clothier =

American musician (1921–2006)

Hurshul P. Clothier
- Born: November 18, 1921; Chester, Oklahoma, U.S.
- Died: April 2, 2006 (aged 84) Eufaula, Oklahoma, U.S.
- Genres: Western swing
- Occupations: Musician, Bandleader
- Instrument: Fiddle
- Years active: 1950s-1990s
- Formerly of: The Oklahoma Travelers

Hurshul Clothier (November 18, 1921 – April 2, 2006) was one of the pioneers of the big band sound of western swing. In 1953 he organized a western swing band, The Oklahoma Travelers, at the time referred to as the youngest band in the West. Hurshul Clothier and The Oklahoma Travelers traveled the country delighting fans with their unique western swing style and were considered the leading dance band in the southwest. They provided back up for such country greats as Bob Wills, Glen Campbell and touring with the late Lefty Frizzell.

In 1972, Hurshul Clothier built the Belle Starr Theater in Eufaula, Oklahoma where he hosted many live country music events over the years, including the Bob Wills Weekend, an annual event held in the last weekend of September until 2004.

Clothier reorganized his band in 1982 using the former Texas Playboys and recorded an album, Jam Session. The album was highlighted in the 1984 edition of Country Music magazine.

In 1996, Clothier was inducted into the Oklahoma Country and Western Music Hall of Fame. His classic western swing style continues to be a favorite for many country western music fans of all ages.

In 2006, Clothier was inducted into the Western Swing Music Society of the Southwest.
