= Chester, Oklahoma =

- Census-designated place
- Location within Oklahoma Location within the United States
- Coordinates: 36°13′00″N 98°55′15″W
- Country: United States
- State: Oklahoma
- County: Major

Area
  - Total: 3.98 sq mi (10.32 km^{2})
  - Land: 3.98 sq mi (10.32 km^{2})
  - Water: 0.0039 sq mi (0.01 km^{2})
- Elevation: 1,716 ft (523 m)

Population (2020)
  - Total: 176
  - Density: 44.2/sq mi (17.06/km^{2})
- Time zone: UTC-6 (Central (CST))
  - Summer (DST): UTC-5 (CDT)
- ZIP Code: 73838
- FIPS code: 40-13800
- GNIS feature ID: 2629911

Chester is a census-designated place and unincorporated community in Major County, Oklahoma, United States. As of the 2020 census, the population was 176, up from 117 in 2010. The post office opened April 8, 1895; the ZIP Code is 73838. It is said to have been named for Chester I. Long, U.S. senator from Kansas.

== Geography ==
Chester is in southwestern Major County at the intersection of U.S. Route 60 and 281. US-60 leads east 26 miles (42 km) to Fairview, the Major county seat, while US-281 leads north-northeast 53 miles (85 km) to Alva. The two highways join in Chester and lead south together 5 miles (8 km) to Seiling.

According to the U.S. Census Bureau, the Chester CDP has an area of 3.99 square miles (10.33 km^{2}), of which 0.003 square miles (0.008 km^{2}), or 0.08%, are water. The community is on land that drains toward the Canadian River 2 miles (3 km) to the south.

== Demographics ==
Historical population
Census	Pop.	Note	%±
2010	117		—
2020	176		50.4%
U.S. Decennial Census

=== 2020 census ===
As of the 2020 census, Chester had a population of 176. The median age was 41.6 years. 25.6% of residents were under the age of 18 and 18.8% of residents were 65 years of age or older. For every 100 females there were 77.8 males, and for every 100 females age 18 and over there were 63.8 males age 18 and over.

0.0% of residents lived in urban areas, while 100.0% lived in rural areas.

There were 60 households in Chester, of which 35.0% had children under the age of 18 living in them. Of all households, 65.0% were married-couple households, 8.3% were households with a male householder and no spouse or partner present, and 23.3% were households with a female householder and no spouse or partner present. About 28.4% of all households were made up of individuals and 15.0% had someone living alone who was 65 years of age or older.

There were 83 housing units, of which 27.7% were vacant. The homeowner vacancy rate was 13.7% and the rental vacancy rate was 11.1%.

Racial composition as of the 2020 census
Race	Number	Percent
White	144	81.8%
Black or African American	0	0.0%
American Indian and Alaska Native	3	1.7%
Asian	1	0.6%
Native Hawaiian and Other Pacific Islander	0	0.0%
Some other race	22	12.5%
Two or more races	6	3.4%
Hispanic or Latino (of any race)	27	15.3%

=== 2010 census ===
As of the 2010 census, Chester had a population of 117.

== Notable person ==
- Hurshul Clothier, musician
