= Bob Lewis (Kansas politician) =

American politician

Member of the Kansas House of Representatives from the 123rd district
- Incumbent
- Assumed office January 9, 2023
- Preceded by: John Wheeler Jr.

Personal details
- Born: Garden City, Kansas
- Party: Republican
- Profession: Lawyer

Bob Lewis is an American politician. He has served as a Republican member of the Kansas House of Representatives since 2023, representing the 123rd district.

== Biography ==
Lewis graduated from Garden City High School in 1976. He earned a bachelor's degree from Grinnell College in 1980 and a J.D. degree from Stanford University in 1984. He is a Christian.

== Political positions ==
Lewis is anti-abortion. He supported the 2022 Kansas abortion referendum.
