= Warren Livingston =

American football player (born 1938)

No. 41
- Position: Cornerback

Personal information
- Born: July 5, 1938 (age 88); Eufaula, Oklahoma, U.S.
- Listed height: 5 ft 10 in (1.78 m)
- Listed weight: 192 lb (87 kg)

Career information
- High school: Mesa (Mesa, Arizona)
- College: Arizona
- NFL draft: 1961: undrafted

Career history
- Dallas Cowboys (1961–1966)

Awards and highlights
- All-Border Conference (1959); NFL All-rookie team (1961)

Career NFL statistics
- Games played - started: 67 - 60
- Interceptions: 10
- Fumble recoveries: 6
- Stats at Pro Football Reference

Warren Livingston (born July 5, 1938) is an American former professional football player who was a cornerback for the Dallas Cowboys of the National Football League (NFL). He played college football for the Arizona Wildcats.

== Early life ==
Livingston attended Mesa High School where he first began to play football and was a two-way player. He was named to the All-state team at halfback in his last 2 years. In track, he set the school long jump record and was a 3-time state champion.

He accepted a scholarship from the University of Arizona, where he became a three-year starter. He was a two-way player and a versatile athlete, that in games was used as a running back, cornerback and wide receiver.

In 1959, he received All-Border Conference honors after averaging 6.7 yards per carry and leading his team in rushing with 380 yards, while his teammate Walt Mince had a 6.1-yard average.

In 1960, although he was more focused on defense, he set a school record with an 80-yard punt return against the University of Colorado. He also had one of his best games against the three touchdown favored Arizona State University team, that was looking to win a fifth Territorial Cup in a row. In the game, he had a 60-yard touchdown in a 35-7 upset.

Livingston also was a part of the track and field team, where he competed in the long jump, high jump and sprints. His 24 feet long jump in 1960, made him the third best jumper in school history. He highjumped 6-1. He won several scholastic honors while studying engineering.

In 1991, he was inducted into the University of Arizona Sports Hall of Fame.

== Professional career ==
Livingston was signed as an undrafted free agent by the Dallas Cowboys, after not being selected in the 1961 NFL draft. He was moved to cornerback and became a starter as a rookie, until suffering a serious fracture on his left arm against the St. Louis Cardinals and being placed on the injured reserve list on November 6. He was named to the NFL All-rookie team at the end of the year.

In 1962, he missed most of the pre-season with another injury to the same arm, which limited him to play in only 3 games during the regular season. The next year, he was named the starter at free safety, because he was considered a great open field tackler.

In 1964, he was moved back to cornerback and although he was waived on September 3, he was later re-signed and did not miss any games, splitting time (7 starts) with Don Bishop at right cornerback. The next two years he was the regular starter at right cornerback.

Livingston experienced a difficult 1966 NFL Championship Game against the Green Bay Packers, where he was targeted on key third down plays that would impact the final result. He was released on September 5, 1967, after being passed on the depth chart by Mike Johnson.

== Personal life ==
In 1965, Livingston and his wife, Carol, were the first African Americans to purchase property in Tempe, Arizona, which had previously been known as a sundown town.

After football, he received a master's degree in electrical engineering from the University of Arizona and worked for Motorola until his retirement in 1994.

His brother Andy Livingston was a running back in the NFL for the Chicago Bears and the New Orleans Saints.
