= Alexander Posey =

Muscogee poet and journalist from Indian Territory

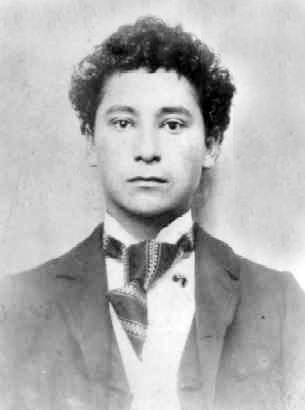
- Born: Alexander Lawrence Posey; August 3, 1873; Eufaula, Creek Nation, Indian Territory
- Died: May 27, 1908 (aged 34); North Canadian River, Oklahoma
- Citizenship: Muscogee
- Occupations: Poet; journalist; humorist; politician
- Writing career
- Pen name: Chinnubbee Harjo
- Genres: Native American literature, poetry, humor, political satire
- Notable work: Fus Fixico Letters

Alexander Lawrence Posey (August 3, 1873 – May 27, 1908) was a Native American poet, humorist, journalist, and politician in the Muscogee (Creek) Nation. He founded the Eufaula Indian Journal in 1901, the first Native American daily newspaper. For several years he published editorial letters known as the Fus Fixico Letters, written by a fictional figure who commented pointedly about Muscogee Nation, Indian Territory, and United States politics during the period of the dissolution of tribal governments and communal lands. He served as secretary to the Sequoyah Constitutional Convention and drafted much of the constitution for its proposed Native American state, but Congress rejected the proposal. Posey died young from drowning while trying to cross the flooding North Canadian River in Oklahoma.

== Early life ==
Alexander Posey was born on August 3, 1873, near present-day Eufaula, Creek Nation in Indian Territory. He was the oldest of 12 children, and his parents were Lewis Henderson "Hence" Posey, a mixed blood of Muscogee and Ustler Scots ancestry, from the Muscogee Berryhill family and Nancy (Phillips) Posey (Muscogee name: Pohas Harjo), who was Muscogee and a member of the Harjo family.

The Muscogee have a matrilineal kinship system, by which Posey and his siblings were considered born into his mother's Wind Clan of the Tuskegee tribal town. They inherited her clan, and property and hereditary positions were passed through her line. Posey's father, Lewis H. Posey, was born to a Scots-Irish and Muscogee family, and he was a citizen of the Muscogee Nation. He had been orphaned at an early age and raised in the Creek Nation; he spoke the Muscogee language fluently; and he was made a member of the Broken Arrow tribal town. Young Alexander and his siblings spoke Muscogee as their first language. As they grew older, their father insisted they speak English as well; when Posey was fourteen, his father would punish him if he spoke Muscogee. From that time, Posey received a formal education, including three years at Bacone Indian University in Muskogee, Oklahoma.

In 1896 at 23 years old, Posey married Minnie Harris, a schoolteacher. Together they had three children, Yahola Irving, Pachina Kipling, and Wynema Torrans Posey, each with a middle name drawn from one of the couple's literary heroes.

== Career ==
Posey studied writing at Bacone College. He read naturalists such as John Burroughs and Henry David Thoreau, who inspired him to write about the landscape of his childhood.

After college, he worked at Indian Journal, where he published poems. In 1895, he represented the Wind Clan as a member of the Creek National Council. He was also the director of a Creek orphanage.

In 1901, Posey edited the newspaper, Eufaula Indian Journal. He gained national recognition for founding the first Indian-published daily newspaper.

In 1906, Posey was secretary for the Sequoyah Constitutional Convention, called to draft a constitution for a state to be majority Native American. According to the Encyclopedia of Oklahoma, he is credited with having written most of that constitution. The Native Americans hoped to gain a state of their own, in the period when whites were pushing for the Oklahoma and Indian territories to be admitted as a state to the Union. The Native Americans were not successful. Their tribal structures were dissolved as part of extinguishing Native American land title in what became the state of Oklahoma.

== Fus Fixico letters ==
As Posey honed his satirical skills, he created a fictional persona, Fus Fixico (Muscogee for "Heartless Bird"), whose editorial letters were published in the Indian Journal. Fus Fixico was represented as a full-blood Muscogee traditionalist, whose chatty letters were about his everyday life or detailed accounts that he had heard the fictional Muscogee medicine man Hotgun share with an audience of Creek elders: Kono Harjo, Tookpafka Micco, and Wolf Warrior. These monologues are written in Muscogee dialect.

The Fus Fixico Letters have aspects of nostalgia but are primarily sharp political commentary about Muscogee Nation, Indian Territory, and United States politics. This was a time of political upheaval because Creek and other tribes' communal lands were being broken up into individual household allotments under the Dawes Act, to extinguish land title in preparation for statehood. The Curtis Act of 1898 dismantled tribal governments and institutions, also in preparation for Indian Territory to become part of the state of Oklahoma.

Experienced politicians from the Five Civilized Tribes met to draft a constitution to establish an Indigenous-controlled State of Sequoyah, but their proposals were rejected by the US Federal Government. Posey served as secretary for the 1906 State of Sequoyah convention. His Fus Fixico letters from 1902 to 1908 poked fun as statehood was debated. Various US newspapers proposed syndicating the Fus Fixico letters nationwide, but Posey refused. His readership was within Indian Territory, and he did not believe a non-Native audience would understand the humor.

So-called dialect literature was extremely popular at the dawn of the 20th century. Usually dialect literature was based on African-American dialect. The Posey family had also avidly read Robert Burns, who wrote poetry in the Scots language. Posey's father read such dialect writers as Max Adler, Josh Billings, Paul Laurence Dunbar, and James Whitcomb Riley. Alexander Posey saw dialects as a means of expressing Muscogee oratory styles in English; he did not care for dialect writers who tried to adopt it as part of a popular trend: "Those cigar store Indian dialect stories...will fool no one who has lived 'six months in the precinct.' Like the wooden aborigine, they are the product of a white man's factory, and bear no resemblance to the real article."

== Death and legacy ==
On May 27, 1908, Posey was swept away while trying to cross the flooded North Canadian River with a friend. His body was recovered a week later, and buried at Greenhill Cemetery in Muskogee.

In April 2017, the University of Central Oklahoma honored Posey by inaugurating the Alexander Lawrence Posey Speaker Series, showcasing voices considered "othered" in contemporary literary discourse. Poet Danez Smith was the inaugural speaker.

== Published works ==
A number of his collected works have been published posthumously.

- The Poems Of Alexander Lawrence Posey: Alex Posey, The Creek Indian Poet, Minnie H. Posey, ed. (1910). Topeka: Crane & Company (Reprinted 2010 Kessinger Press. ISBN 978-1-163-08652-0).
- Lost Creeks: Collected Journals, Matthew Wynn Sivils, ed. (2009) Lincoln: University of Nebraska Press. ISBN 978-0-8032-1628-0.
- Song of the Oktahutche: Collected Poems, Matthew Wynn Sivils, ed. (2008) Lincoln: University of Nebraska Press. ISBN 978-0-8032-2053-9.
- Chinnubbie and the Owl: Muscogee (Creek) Stories, Orations, and Oral Traditions, Matthew Wynn Sivils, ed. (2005). Lincoln: University of Nebraska Press. ISBN 978-0-8032-3746-9.
- The Fus Fixico Letters, Daniel Littlefield Jr. and Carl A. Petty Hunter, ed. (1993)Lincoln: University of Nebraska Press. ASIN B001QREZM0.
- "Journal of Alexander Lawrence Posey," Chronicles of Oklahoma. 1968, ASIN B003ZW6ZHM.
- "Journal of Creek Enrollment Field Party, 1905," Chronicles of Oklahoma. 1968, ASIN B003ZWAAOG.

== See also ==
- McIntosh County Seat War
