= McIntosh County Seat War =

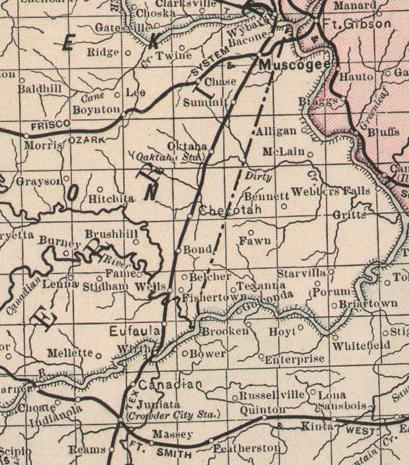
- A map of the McIntosh County area from 1905.
- Date: 1907–1909
- Location: McIntosh County, Oklahoma, USA
- Outcome: Eufaula becomes the permanent county seat.
- Deaths: 2

The McIntosh County Seat War was a dispute in Oklahoma over the location of the McIntosh County seat that took place between 1907 and 1909. Following a pair of elections that resulted in the town of Checotah being designated as the new county seat, the people of Eufaula refused to hand over the county records. As a result, a group of heavily armed men from Checotah attempted to seize the records, but were forced to surrender during the gunbattle that ensued. One year later, after another close election, Eufaula became the permanent county seat.

== The war ==
During the settling of the Western United States, conflicts frequently arose between neighboring towns when they were competing for the county seat. Most of Oklahoma's "county seat wars", as they were called, were concluded without bloodshed, and involved little more than heated words and close elections. The situation in McIntosh County, however, ended up being much more serious. McIntosh County was established at statehood in 1907, when the population was 17,975. Before then, the area had been part of the Eufaula District of the Creek Nation.

On the afternoon of January 9, 1907, the territorial government in Guthrie, sent a telegram to Checotah stating that the legislative committee had selected the town as the temporary seat of McIntosh County, until an election could be held to decide new a permanent location. The people of Checotah were very happy with the surprising news, since being selected as the temporary county seat meant having a better chance of becoming the permanent one in the upcoming election. The whole town celebrated; citizens danced in the streets, church bells rang, and shopkeepers passed out cigars.

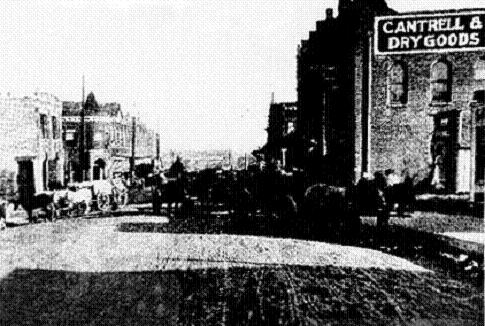
A street scene in Checotah around 1900.

Their good fortune soon turned into disappointment, however, when a Eufaula attorney and delegate to the constitutional convention named William C. Liedtke heard of the news. Liedtke delivered a "rousing" speech in support of Eufaula to the general assembly on January 17, and called for a vote to decide the matter. The subsequent tally recorded that Eufaula had received forty-two votes, and Checotah forty-one. As a result, and in spite of the telegram and the celebration in Checotah a few days before, Eufaula was designated as the new temporary county seat. A two-story building on the northeast corner of Main Street and Riley Avenue was then rented for use as a courthouse, and the county records were moved there.

Unsurprisingly, the people of Checotah were not very happy with the decision and protested, but they soon quieting down and began focusing on the upcoming special election. The people of Eufaula did the same, as did the people of Stidham, which is located about eight miles northwest of Eufaula. "Boosters" from all three actively campaigned for their towns over the following months.

The special election was held on May 23, 1908. The preliminary count reported that Checotah had received 1,647 votes, Eufaula about 1200, and Stidham 384. Since Checotah received sixty-three votes more than the combined totals of the other two towns, it was assumed to be the winner. When the election was over, the ballot boxes were delivered to Guthrie for confirmation. Soon after, the people of Eufaula complained that heavy rains prevented over 300 of their supporters from reaching the polls. The rain was so bad that the noted poet and Creek leader Alexander Posey drowned in the nearby Canadian River. As the results were being confirmed in Guthrie, a problem arose with some sixty-five ballots that were referred to as "unaccounted for." Ultimately, the problem cast doubts on the legitimacy of the entire election and created a controversy about the propriety of the earlier count, which reported that Checotah was the winner.

At the beginning of June 1908 the attorneys representing Eufaula's campaign obtained a hearing with Chief Justice Robert L. Williams of the Oklahoma Supreme Court and convinced him to issue a temporary injunction, preventing anybody from removing the county offices in Eufaula, until "certain alleged discrepancies" were resolved. One Guthrie newspaper described the situation: "Checotah has a tail-hold and a down-hill pull but Eufaula has a bull-dog grip in the flank, and will hold on until the [county] offices are moved."

=== The Battle of Eufaula ===
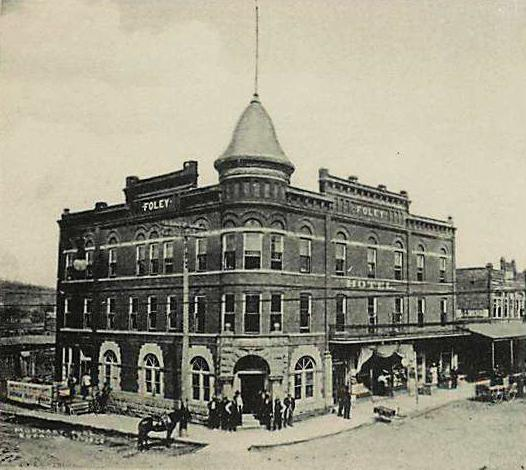
The Foley Building in 1907. The bottom half of the building was occupied by the First National Bank, while the top half was used as a hotel. The fighting occurred at the intersection in front of the building, and "General" Dunlap was killed on the third floor.

W. Frank Jones was a former deputy US marshal who lived in Checotah and one of the major "boosters" for his town in the county seat contest. According to Ken Butler, author of More Oklahoma Renegades, when the people of Checotah heard that the Eufaula attorneys had blocked the county offices from being moved to their town, "there was a swell of support to take up arms" and take by force what they felt was theirs.

On Sunday morning, June 7, 1908, a "squad" of about twenty-five heavily armed men under the command of Frank Jones boarded a special train in Checotah and rode the fifteen miles south to Eufaula. After arriving in town at about noon, the men split up into two groups. From the depot the smaller group marched north and found Edward C. Julian, who had the keys to the county offices. The other larger group, which was personally led by Jones and consisted of about fifteen men, headed straight for the town's main intersection of Foley Avenue and Main Street, which offered a commanding view of the courthouse.

While marching there, two Eufaula deputy city marshals named Henry Keiser and F. M. Woods briefly confronted Jones, who told them "to get off the streets, else they would get the contents of his gun." Keiser and Woods backed off, but then went around to warn the other Eufaula men in town, most of whom were on their way home from church. Within a short amount of time, several Eufaula men had armed themselves to face off with Jones and his raiders. The owner of a local hardware store passed out guns to those who did not have weapons of their own.

The first casualty in the ensuring battle was Marshal Woods, who was mortally wounded by Special Deputy Sheriff Joe Parmenter. Parmenter struck Woods three times, but was then fired on and hit twice as he was trying to take cover behind a water trough. According to Butler, around the same time word was sent to the home of the Grant Johnson, an African-American policeman in Eufaula and former deputy US marshal, asking for his help. When Johnson arrived in Eufaula from his home two miles outside of town, he was greeted by the defenders, who were happy to have a former deputy US marshal on their side.

Johnson and Jones had once worked together as officers of the law, so when Johnson saw the other he asked for him to surrender. Jones, who had mutual respect for his former fellow officer and could see that his men were already outnumbered by the growing Eufaula force, agreed to negotiate. Ken Butler says that Jones had to do "a lot of coaxing" to get his men to lay down their arms and give up the records they had taken, but he eventually succeeded. The disappointed raiders were then taken prisoner and loaded onto a train to be sent home, some eight hours after having arrived in Eufaula.

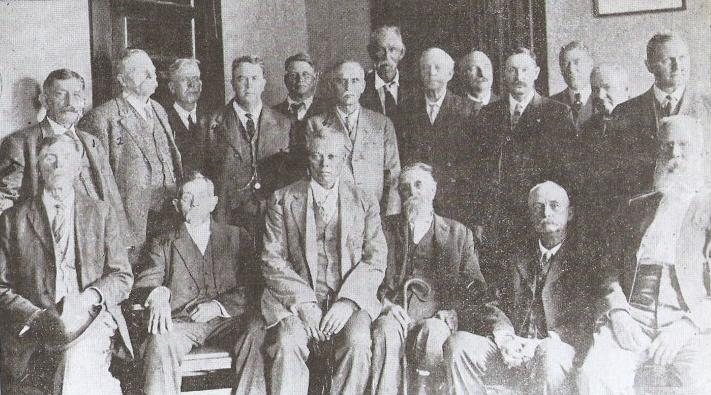
The first deputy US marshals to serve in the Northern District of the Indian Territory, including Frank Jones (standing, 10th from left) and Grant Johnson (sitting, 3rd from left) in 1897.

The following was written by W. R. Withington, a telephone operator who witnessed the fighting, for The Chronicles:

Suddenly, things began to happen. The M.K.&T. ("Katy ") train from Muskogee and Checotah was late and arrived in Eufaula about noon. A group of men from Checotah got off the train, stiff with guns, and they began scattering out over the town of Eufaula preparatory to taking it over. Part of them went north, circling around to the court house for the purpose of taking the county records and carrying them to Checotah. The rest of them went to different parts of the town. Some of them came up Foley Avenue between the Telephone Building and the old Tully Building, shooting as they came, some of the bullets hitting the telephone building. The intersection of Main Street and Foley Avenue, adjacent to the telephone building, was a "no man's land" and also the central point of the battlefield. I sought security behind the telephone switchboard, and I did not come out until the shooting had subsided. ... The Checotah group was not successful in securing possession of the County records. Eufaula became the county seat of McIntosh County, things quieted down, and I survived this "wild and wooly" event in the history of the old Indian Territory part of Oklahoma.

Shortly after the train of Checotah men pulled out of town, a former deputy US marshal named "General" Dunlap decided to seek out and arrest the county clerk, Edward C. Julian, who was suspected of collaborating with Jones and his raiders. Dunlap, who was reported to have been drinking before attempting to make the arrest, then headed for the hotel in the Foley Building, which is located at the same intersection the Checotah raiders had occupied. Dunlap soon found Julian's room on the third floor, but the latter was ready for any trouble.

Julian heard suspicious noises outside his door before Dunlap knocked on it. Julian answered the door, and although it is not known what words were exchanged between the two men, within seconds they were shooting at one another. The shootout, which was fought at point-blank range, was over in just a few seconds. Dunlap was mortally wounded, having been hit in the forehead by one of Julian's bullets. Julian managed to get away unharmed.

=== The final election ===
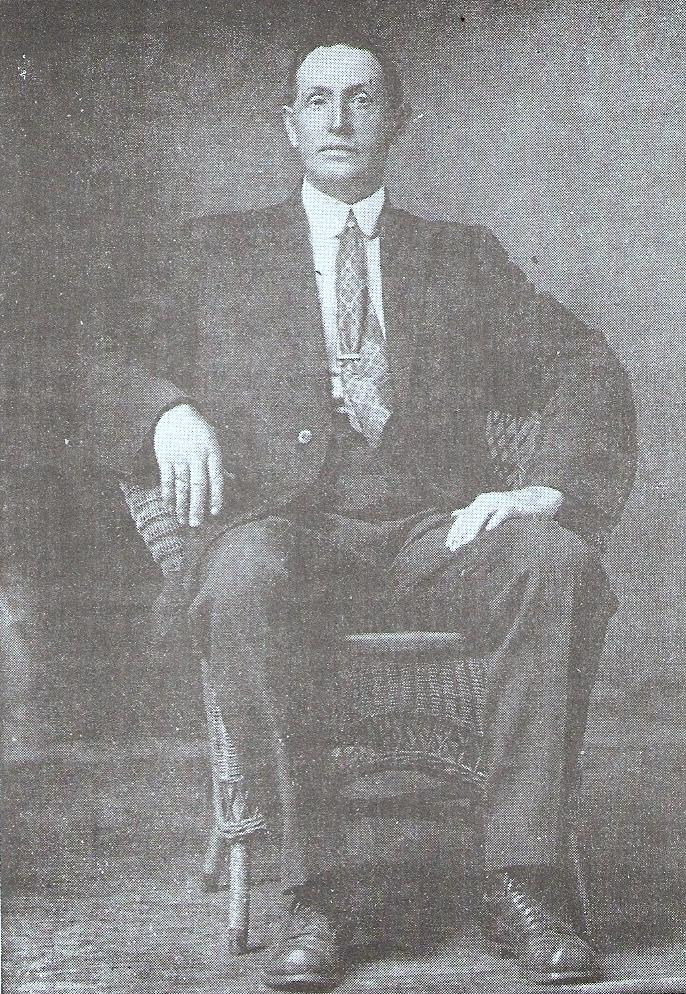
Frank Jones

In all, two men were killed and the wounded Joe Parmenter recovered. Frank Jones was also criticized for having failed to complete his mission. About two weeks after the clash, Governor Charles N. Haskell announced his findings of the McIntosh County special election. Haskell reported that 3,284 votes had been cast at the polls on May 23, 1908, and that more of the voters preferred Checotah over Eufaula and Stidham combined. It made no difference, though. An appeal was pending before the Oklahoma Supreme Court and an injunction to forestall the removal of the county offices from Eufaula had been issued. Ultimately, it was decided that a new special election would have to be held in order to resolve the controversy once and for all.

In January 1909, shortly after the state legislature convened, a freshman senator named Richard Billups from Cordell related a story of the county seat election held on January 17, 1907. Billups said that when the senate called for a vote, he illegally cast a vote in his friends name in favor of Eufaula. Upon hearing of the story, Senator Harry Beeler of Checotah, who had supplied Jones with the special train on June 7, 1908, realized that Billups' illegal ballot was the one that had given Eufaula the one-point margin in the January 1907 election, and that Billups was therefore responsible for the resulting controversy and bloodshed. However, when Billups realized what he had done, he quickly recanted his entire story, and said he was merely joking about the whole thing.

Billups' story was still being discussed when the final special election took place on February 10, 1909. Only Eufaula and Checotah were in the race. Eufaula received 1,919 votes and Checotah 1,844, but this time the results were not contested, and Eufaula has been the seat of McIntosh County ever since.

== Aftermath ==
Both Joe Parmenter and Edward C. Julian were arrested for murder, but neither were convicted. Julian went back to his old job within a year after the shootout, and Parmenter was acquitted in June 1909. Frank Jones went back to his home in Checotah and years later wrote a book about his adventures while serving as a lawman in Oklahoma. The book, which was titled: The Experiences of a Deputy U.S. Marshal of the Indian Territory, discusses many of Jones' experiences during his long career as a lawman, as well as other adventures after his retirement, but it makes no mention of the McIntosh County Seat War.

In July 1925, the old courthouse in Eufaula burned down and was rebuilt into a one-story building. Many of the county records that the two factions had fought for were lost to the flames. The current McIntosh County Courthouse was built two years later in 1927. On April 14, 1988, the Eufaula Business District, which includes the Foley Building, was placed on the National Register of Historic Places by the United States Department of the Interior.

== See also ==
- List of feuds in the United States
- List of Old West gunfights
