= Kendall Carl Campbell =

Recipient of the Navy Cross

- Born: July 25, 1917; Garden City, Kansas
- Died: May 8, 1942 (aged 24); Coral Sea
- Military career
- Allegiance: United States of America
- Branch: United States Naval Reserve
- Service years: 1940-1942
- Rank: Ensign
- Unit: Scouting Squadron Five (VS-5)
- Conflicts: World War II; *Battle of the Coral Sea; *New Guinea campaign
- Awards: Navy Cross; Gold Star in lieu of the Second Navy Cross

Kendall Carl Campbell (July 25, 1917 – May 8, 1942) was a United States Navy officer who received two Navy Crosses for actions in World War II.

== Navy career ==
After enlisting in the Naval Reserve 28 October 1940, Campbell reported to the Naval Reserve Aviation Base in Kansas City for flight training 15 November. Appointed Aviation Cadet on 1 February 1941, he became an ensign on 19 August. He was assigned to carrier combat squadrons, courageously engaging the enemy in the early actions.

== Awarded the Navy Cross ==
During the Battle of the Coral Sea, Ens. Campbell lost his life in this action and was awarded the Navy Cross posthumously. The official Navy citation:

The Navy Cross is presented to Kendall C. Campbell (0-099660), Ensign, U.S. Navy (Reserve), for extraordinary heroism and courageous devotion to duty as Pilot of an airplane in Scouting Squadron FIVE (VS-5), embarked from the U.S.S. YORKTOWN (CV-5) in action against enemy Japanese forces at Tulagi Harbor on 4 May 1942, and in the Battle of the Coral Sea on 7 and 8 May 1942. These attacks, vigorously and persistently pressed home in the face of heavy anti-aircraft fire, and on 8 May opposed also by enemy fighters, resulted in the sinking or damaging of at least eight enemy Japanese vessels at Tulagi and the sinking of one carrier and the sinking or severe damaging of another in the Coral Sea. Ensign Campbell's conscientious devotion to duty and gallant self-command against formidable odds were in keeping with the highest traditions of the United States Naval Service.

He was also awarded the Gold Star in lieu of the Second Navy Cross for service in New Guinea. The official Navy citation:

The Navy Cross is presented to Kendall C. Campbell (0-099660), Ensign, U.S. Navy (Reserve), for extraordinary heroism and distinguished service as Pilot of an airplane in Scouting Squadron FIVE (VF-5), embarked from the U.S.S. YORKTOWN (CV-5), in action against enemy Japanese forces near Salamaua and Lae, New Guinea, on 10 March 1942. Ensign Campbell pressed home, in the face of heavy anti-aircraft fire, a vigorous and determined dive bombing attack on enemy ships, making a direct hit on one hostile vessel. By his superb airmanship and outstanding courage he contributed to the destruction of the three enemy ships and upheld the highest traditions of the United States Naval Service.

== Namesake ==
USS Kendall C. Campbell (DE-443) was named in his honor. She was launched 19 March 1944 by the Federal Shipbuilding & Drydock Company, Newark, New Jersey; sponsored by Mrs. Carl B. Campbell; and commissioned 31 July 1944, Lt. Comdr. R. W. Johnson in command.
