= USS Kendall C. Campbell =

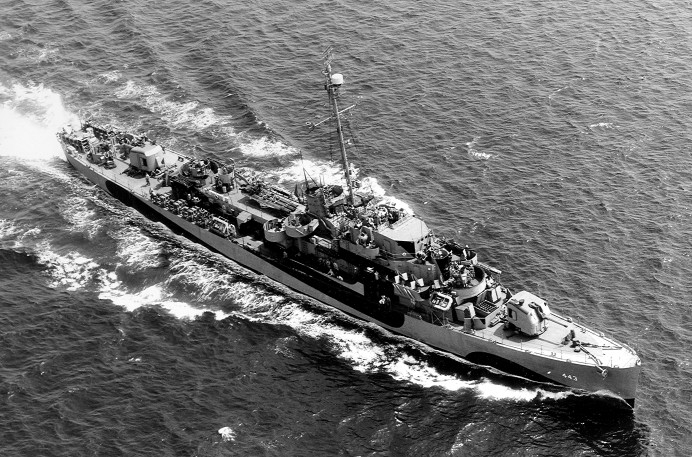

History

United States
- Namesake: Kendall C. Campbell
- Laid down: 16 December 1943
- Launched: 19 March 1944
- Commissioned: 31 July 1944
- Decommissioned: 31 May 1946
- Stricken: 15 January 1972
- Fate: Sold for scrapping 15 January 1973

General characteristics
- Displacement: 1,350 long tons (1,372 t)
- Length: 306 ft (93 m) (oa)
- Beam: 36 ft 10 in (11.23 m)
- Draught: 13 ft 4 in (4.06 m) (max)
- Propulsion: 2 boilers, 2 geared steam turbines, 12,000 shp, 2 screws
- Speed: 24 knots
- Range: 6,000 nm @ 12 knots
- Complement: 14 officers, 201 enlisted
- Armament: 2-5 in (130 mm) 4 (2×2)40 mm AA 10-20 mm AA 3-21 inch (533 mm) TT 1 Hedgehog 8 DCT's, 2 DC tracks

USS Kendall C. Campbell (DE-443) was a John C. Butler-class destroyer escort acquired by the U.S. Navy during World War II. The primary purpose of the destroyer escort was to escort and protect ships in convoy, in addition to other tasks as assigned, such as patrol or radar picket. Post-war she returned home with four battle stars to her credit.

Kendall C. Campbell was named in honor of Kendall Carl Campbell who was twice awarded the Navy Cross, once during the New Guinea campaign and again during the Battle of the Coral Sea.

== Service history ==
Kendall C. Campbell was launched 19 March 1944 by the Federal Shipbuilding & Drydock Co., Newark, New Jersey; sponsored by Mrs. Carl B. Campbell; and commissioned 31 July 1944.

Kendall C. Campbell departed New York 20 August 1944 for shakedown exercises off Bermuda. Ten days later she departed Norfolk, Virginia, transited the Panama Canal, and arrived Pearl Harbor 30 October. The destroyer escort was assigned to hunter-killer operations out of Hawaii with Corregidor and performed this duty until she sailed for Ulithi 24 November. She immediately commenced ASW patrols designed to keep the supply lanes to the Marianas and Western Carolines open.

Anxiously awaiting her first major encounter, Campbell put to sea 1 January 1945, and sortied with the Luzon Attack Force for the invasion of Lingayen Gulf. She returned to Ulithi 5 February for a short overhaul period, departing 2 weeks later for carrier escort duty during the occupation of Iwo Jima. When the volcano island was secure, Kendall C. Campbell put into Ulithi to prepare for the Okinawa invasion.

The destroyer escort sailed 21 March accompanying escort carriers as they unleashed air raids in the pre-invasion strikes against Japanese positions on Okinawa. After the American assault forces hit the beach 1 April, Kendall C. Campbell stood by until the island was free of enemy resistance and offered all possible support to the successful campaign.

As the war moved closer to the enemy homeland, on 26 June Campbell joined the Logistics Support Group, which operated northeast of Honshū, during the carrier strikes on Japan's home islands. In early August she searched for Japanese submarines southeast of Okinawa Gunto and was on this mission when the fighting ended. During the first week of September she furnished ASW patrols for the Tokyo Occupation Force en route to Japan. After escorting a group of 54 LST's from Tokyo to Manila, she returned to Yokosuka 16 October. Kendall C. Campbell received four battle stars for World War II service

Kendall C. Campbell departed Japan 4 November, arriving San Pedro, Los Angeles, 22 November. The destroyer escort decommissioned at San Diego, California, 31 May 1946 and joined the Pacific Reserve Fleet. She was berthed at Stockton, California. On 15 January 1972 she was struck from the Navy List, and, on 15 January 1973, she was sold for scrapping.
