= Isaiah Edward Robinson Jr. =

Tuskegee Airman and American educator (1924–2011)

Isaiah Edward Robinson Jr. (February 17, 1924 – April 14, 2011) was the first African-American president of the New York City Board of Education. He chaired the Board's Decentralization Committee from May, 1969 to April, 1970. Robinson graduated from the Tuskegee Institute Flight School on November 20, 1945 and was one of the Documented Original Tuskegee Airmen (DOTA).

== Life ==
Isaiah Edward Robinson Jr. was born in Birmingham, Alabama, on February 17, 1924. He grew up in Rosedale. He was the son of Isaiah Robinson, Sr. and Willia Robinson (née Willis). He had one sister. His marriage to Sylvia Lawson produced a son, Larry Robinson (b. 1949). A widowed Robinson later in life adopted three sons who were also brothers. Robinson did not have other children.

Robinson graduated from Rosedale High School in 1942 and the Art Career School in New York City in 1949.

He retired from public life around 1986. He lived in Middletown, New York, with his adopted sons before he returned to Birmingham, Alabama, where he died on April 14, 2011, following a stroke. He was predeceased by his parents, sister, wife, and oldest son.

Robinson participated in the unveiling of the new Tuskegee Airmen wing at Homewood Suites by Hilton at Stewart International Airport in January, 2008. The fourth floor wing includes a gallery of Tuskegee Airmen pictures and it overlooks the airport's runways.

== Career ==
Robinson worked as the art director for Delmar Printing from 1958 to 1969.

Robinson was a New York City Board of Education member from 1969 to 1978. "Robinson was the first African American president of the Board of Education...for the school years 1971–1972 and 1975–1976." He also chaired the Board's Decentralization Committee from May 1969 to April 1970.

He held "ex officio posts in state and national organizations" while president of the New York Board of Education: trustee of the Public Education Association, director of the New York State School Boards Association, and New York State delegate to the National School Boards Association. Robinson also consulted/advised the New York Human Resource Administration, the Urban Coalition, Manhattan Borough President Percy E. Sutton, and the Intermediate School 201 complex's governing board.

Robinson was chairman of the New York City Commission on Human Rights from 1978 to 1984. The commission conducted a study of 50 real estate agents and found that more than half of the listing landlords discriminated against families with children. The commission recommended that the Council allow the prosecution of landlords who illegally deny housing. "A noisy demonstration touched off" with most of the audience chanting "Money for schools, not for war" when Robinson spoke in favor of the Junior Reserve Officers' Training Corps (JROTC) program expanding to Curtis High School and Staten Island. The expense to the city for the expansion totaled $86,000. Robinson resigned his post May, 1984 "to move on to other challenges."

Robinson worked in the Community Trust's Office of University and Corporate Affairs from 1984 to 1986.

Robinson became chairman of the Freedom National Bank of New York in 1988. Robinson and George A. Russell Jr.'s management team took over the troubled institution "but was unable to attract enough new investors or staunch the bank's growing losses...$1.9 million in 1988 and $2.8 million [in 1989], according to David M. Barr, an F.D.I.C. spokesman. [Nineteen-ninety's] losses were expected to exceed $2 million." The Freedom National Bank of New York was founded in 1964 by Jackie Robinson, Attorney Dunbar McLaurin, and other investors. It was based in Harlem, New York.

== Activism ==
He held leadership positions in the African-American community in the areas of education and economic development: Associate Director of the Harlem Freedom School, Arrangements Chairman of the 1967 National Conference on Black Power, Chairmen of the Harlem Parents' Committee, and President of Harlem Commonwealth Council of Economic Development.

In the early 1960s, Robinson was an active participate in the integration efforts of New York City schools. "He was remembered in 1963 for walking out of a school board meeting and denouncing the board's integration plans as 'gradualism and tokenism'. During the 1966 controversy over community control, he accused the Board of Education of standing by while 'children are being slaughtered through educational genocide'".

== Military ==
Robinson graduated as Second Lieutenant from the Tuskegee Institute Flight School on November 20, 1945, as a member of class 45-H-TE. He was commissioned a pilot in the U.S. Army Air Force.

== See also ==
- Dogfights (TV series)
- Executive Order 9981
- Freeman Field Mutiny
- List of Tuskegee Airmen
- Military history of African Americans
- The Tuskegee Airmen (movie)
