= National Register of Historic Places listings in McIntosh County, Oklahoma =

Location of McIntosh County in Oklahoma

This is a list of the National Register of Historic Places listings in McIntosh County, Oklahoma.

This is intended to be a complete list of the properties and districts on the National Register of Historic Places in McIntosh County, Oklahoma, United States. The locations of National Register properties and districts for which the latitude and longitude coordinates are included below, may be seen in a map.

There are 16 properties and districts listed on the National Register in the county.

This National Park Service list is complete through NPS recent listings posted October 23, 2026.

== Current listings ==
	Name on the Register	Image	Date listed	Location	City or town	Description
1	Baccus House		April 17, 2025 (#100011715)	124331 S. 3981 Rd; 35°12′44″N 95°55′35″W	Vernon	
2	Checotah Business District	Checotah Business District	September 13, 1982 (#82003688)	Gentry Ave. between W. 1st and W. Main Sts. and Broadway Ave. between Lafayette and Spaulding Aves. 35°28′12″N 95°31′22″W	Checotah	
3	Checotah City Hall	Checotah City Hall	June 26, 1998 (#98000733)	201 N. Broadway; 35°28′15″N 95°31′20″W	Checotah	
4	Checotah MKT Depot	Checotah MKT Depot	September 5, 1991 (#91001371)	Paul Carr Dr. 35°28′16″N 95°32′12″W	Checotah	
5	C.L. Cooper Building	C.L. Cooper Building	March 22, 1985 (#85000684)	S. B St. and Harrison; 35°17′03″N 95°34′47″W	Eufaula	
6	Eufaula Armory	Eufaula Armory	May 20, 1994 (#94000481)	48 Memorial Dr. 35°17′21″N 95°34′54″W	Eufaula	
7	Eufaula Business District	Eufaula Business District	April 14, 1988 (#88000400)	Main St. between Pine and Grand Sts. 35°17′12″N 95°34′56″W	Eufaula	
8	First Soil Conservation District Dedication Site		September 20, 1982 (#82003689)	North of Eufaula; 35°18′28″N 95°37′00″W	Eufaula	
9	Honey Springs Battlefield	Honey Springs Battlefield	September 29, 1970 (#70000848)	North of Rentiesville; 35°32′41″N 95°28′41″W	Rentiesville	Extends into Muskogee County
10	Johnson Lake Shelters	Johnson Lake Shelters	December 15, 1978 (#78003086)	Address Restricted	Warner	
11	McIntosh County Courthouse	McIntosh County Courthouse	March 22, 1985 (#85000683)	110 N. 1st St. 35°17′13″N 95°35′03″W	Eufaula	
12	Methodist Episcopal Church, South	Methodist Episcopal Church, South	November 13, 1984 (#84000462)	419 W. Gentry St. 35°28′14″N 95°31′28″W	Checotah	
13	Oklahoma Odd Fellows Home at Checotah	Oklahoma Odd Fellows Home at Checotah	June 14, 2001 (#01000660)	211 W. North St. 35°28′46″N 95°31′15″W	Checotah	
14	Rock Front	Rock Front	June 22, 1984 (#84003152)	Broadway; 35°12′50″N 95°55′34″W	Vernon	
15	Slippery Moss Shelter	Slippery Moss Shelter	December 15, 1978 (#78003085)	Address Restricted	Texanna	
16	Tabor House	Tabor House	September 23, 1996 (#96000979)	631 W. Lafayette; 35°28′13″N 95°31′40″W	Checotah	

== See also ==
- List of National Historic Landmarks in Oklahoma
- National Register of Historic Places listings in Oklahoma
