= Rose Morgan =

Beauty parlor owner and operator (1912–2008)

- Morgan on a 1959 cover of Sepia magazine
- Born: Rose Meta Morgan; August 9, 1912; Mississippi, U.S.
- Died: December 16, 2008 (aged 96); Chicago, Illinois, U.S.
- Spouse: Joe Louis (m. 1955; ann. 1957)

Rose Meta Morgan (August 9, 1912 – December 16, 2008) was the owner and operator of the largest beauty parlor for African American women. She was also among the founders of New York's only black-owned commercial bank, the Freedom National Bank.

== Early life ==
Morgan was one of nine children, the daughter of Chaptle Morgan, a former sharecropper turned businessman, and Winnie Robinson, a homemaker. She was born in Mississippi and raised in Chicago.

== Career ==
She attended the Morris School of Beauty. After she styled Ethel Waters’s hair in 1938, the performer invited her to New York City. She rented a booth in Sugar Hill salons and six month’s later opened her salon, Rose Meta’s House of Beauty, in an old mansion.

By 1946, the salon had 29 employees including stylists, masseurs, and nurses. In 1955, the facility relocated and reopened under a new name, Rose Morgan’s House of Beauty, with additional departments including dressmaking and charm school spread over five floors. A wig salon was added in 1960. A 1946 Ebony article named it the “biggest negro beauty parlor in the world.”

Throughout the 1960s until her retirement in the 1970s, Morgan wrote a column for the New Pittsburgh Courier. Over her career, Morgan trained 3,000 hairdressers in her beauty institutions.

She founded Freedom National Bank, the only commercial bank for African Americans in New York.

== Personal life ==
She married heavyweight boxer Joe Louis in 1955. The marriage was annulled two years later.
