= Brooksville, Oklahoma =

- Town
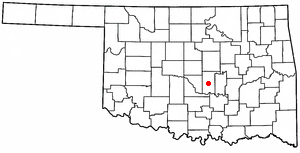
- Location of Brooksville, Oklahoma
- Coordinates: 35°12′35″N 96°57′40″W
- Country: United States
- State: Oklahoma
- County: Pottawatomie

Government
  - Mayor: Keith Davenport

Area
  - Total: 2.98 sq mi (7.71 km^{2})
  - Land: 2.98 sq mi (7.71 km^{2})
  - Water: 0 sq mi (0.00 km^{2})
- Elevation: 961 ft (293 m)

Population (2020)
  - Total: 71
  - Density: 24/sq mi (9.2/km^{2})
- Time zone: UTC-6 (Central (CST))
  - Summer (DST): UTC-5 (CDT)
- FIPS code: 40-09400
- GNIS feature ID: 2411734

Brooksville is a town in Pottawatomie County, Oklahoma, United States. It is one of the thirteen existing all-black towns in Oklahoma. As of the 2020 census, Brooksville had a population of 71.

== History ==
One of more than fifty All-Black towns of Oklahoma, Brooksville is one of only thirteen still existing at the beginning of the twenty-first century. Located in Pottawatomie County 4 miles (6.4 km) southwest of Tecumseh, Brooksville was established in 1903. Originally the town was named Sewell, after a white doctor who owned much of the surrounding land and attended the residents. In 1909 the name changed to Brooksville in honor of the first African American in the area, A. R. Brooks, a cotton buyer and farmer. Brooks served as postmaster here from March 18, 1909, until January 27, 1913, at which time his son, William M. Brooks, became postmaster. In 1906 Rev. Jedson White organized St. John's Baptist Church. Soon afterward, the congregation built a church that still exists. White also promoted the town throughout the South, urging African Americans to settle in Brooksville. Brooksville had a Santa Fe Railroad station, three hotels, two doctors, and two mills.

In 1924, with the aid of the Rosenwald Fund, a new school was built. Banneker School, under management of W. T. McKenzie, was a rock building of four large rooms, a three-hundred-seat auditorium, a small library, and a well-equipped domestic science room. George W. McLaurin, the first African American graduate student at the University of Oklahoma, taught at the school. After a fire, the original building was replaced by a wooden one that served students until the school closed in 1968. The building then became a community center for the town and stands next to the new city hall. A declining cotton market and the Great Depression made life difficult in Brooksville, as in many Oklahoma communities. Most of the residents departed, but the town survived. At the beginning of the twenty-first century Brooksville was steadily increasing in population.

== Geography ==
According to the United States Census Bureau, the town has a total area of 3.0 square miles (7.8 km^{2}), all land.

== Demographics ==
Historical population
Census	Pop.	Note	%±
1910	166		—
1920	99		−40.4%
1930	82		−17.2%
1940	92		12.2%
1950	177		92.4%
1960	101		−42.9%
1970	85		−15.8%
1980	46		−45.9%
1990	69		50.0%
2000	90		30.4%
2010	63		−30.0%
2020	71		12.7%
U.S. Decennial Census

=== 2020 census ===
As of the 2020 census, Brooksville had a population of 71. The median age was 38.5 years. 29.6% of residents were under the age of 18 and 18.3% of residents were 65 years of age or older. For every 100 females there were 102.9 males, and for every 100 females age 18 and over there were 127.3 males age 18 and over.

0.0% of residents lived in urban areas, while 100.0% lived in rural areas.

There were 31 households in Brooksville, of which 48.4% had children under the age of 18 living in them. Of all households, 38.7% were married-couple households, 29.0% were households with a male householder and no spouse or partner present, and 19.4% were households with a female householder and no spouse or partner present. About 16.1% of all households were made up of individuals and 6.5% had someone living alone who was 65 years of age or older.

There were 34 housing units, of which 8.8% were vacant. The homeowner vacancy rate was 4.3% and the rental vacancy rate was 0.0%.

Racial composition as of the 2020 census
Race	Number	Percent
White	37	52.1%
Black or African American	12	16.9%
American Indian and Alaska Native	4	5.6%
Asian	0	0.0%
Native Hawaiian and Other Pacific Islander	0	0.0%
Some other race	0	0.0%
Two or more races	18	25.4%
Hispanic or Latino (of any race)	8	11.3%

=== 2000 census ===
As of the census of 2000, there were 90 people, 32 households, and 23 families residing in the town. The population density was 30.4 inhabitants per square mile (11.7/km^{2}). There were 42 housing units at an average density of 14.2 per square mile (5.5/km^{2}). The racial makeup of the town was 38.89% African American, 35.56% White, 12.22% Native American, and 13.33% from two or more races. Hispanic or Latino of any race were 3.33% of the population.

There were 32 households, out of which 43.8% had children under the age of 18 living with them, 59.4% were married couples living together, 12.5% had a female householder with no husband present, and 28.1% were non-families. 28.1% of all households were made up of individuals, and 9.4% had someone living alone who was 65 years of age or older. The average household size was 2.81 and the average family size was 3.22.

In the town, the population was spread out, with 38.9% under the age of 18, 7.8% from 18 to 24, 18.9% from 25 to 44, 18.9% from 45 to 64, and 15.6% who were 65 years of age or older. The median age was 32 years. For every 100 females, there were 80.0 males. For every 100 females age 18 and over, there were 77.4 males.

The median income for a household in the town was $45,625, and the median income for a family was $45,417. Males had a median income of $51,250 versus $38,750 for females. The per capita income for the town was $15,667. There were 18.5% of families and 15.4% of the population living below the poverty line, including 30.0% of under eighteens and none of those over 64.

== Education ==
Most of the town is in the Macomb Public Schools school district. Small portions are in the Tecumseh Public Schools school district.

== See also ==
- Boley, Clearview, Grayson, Langston, Lima, Redbird, Rentiesville, Summit, Taft, Tatums, Tullahassee, and Vernon, other "All-Black" settlements that were part of the Land Run of 1889.
