= Bethel Missionary Baptist Church =

Historic church in Oklahoma, United States

- U.S. National Register of Historic Places
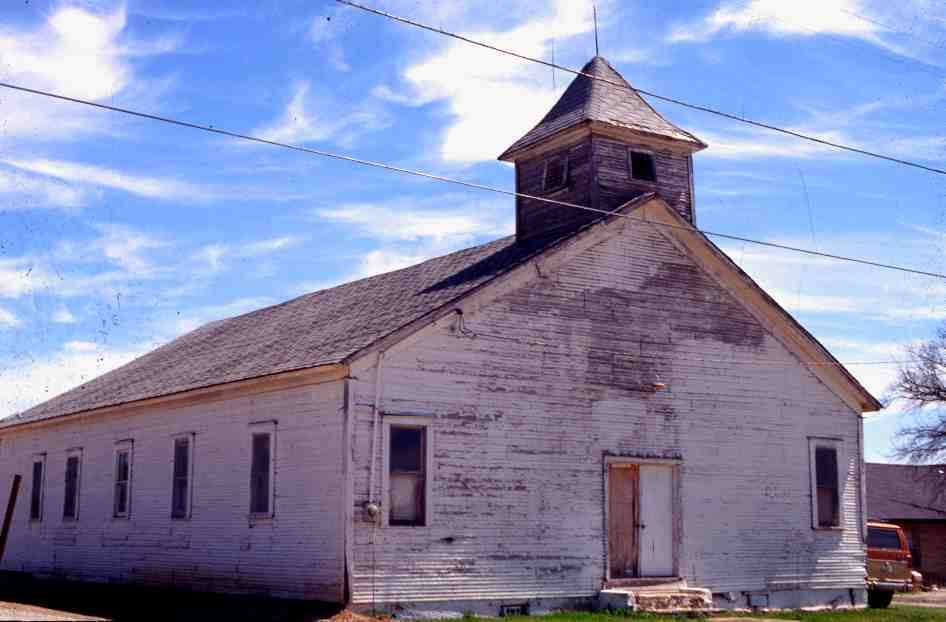

- Location within Oklahoma Location within the United States
- Location: SE corner of Webster and Lane Sts., Tatums, Oklahoma
- Coordinates: 34°28′56″N 97°27′41″W
- Area: less than one acre
- Architect: E. R. McConnell
- Architectural style: Gable-end Church
- NRHP reference No.: 94001519
- Added to NRHP: January 12, 1995

Bethel Missionary Baptist Church is a historic Baptist church building at the junction of Webster and Lane Streets on the southeast corner in Tatums, Oklahoma.

The church building was completed in 1919. It was built in a Gable-end style. The church was a major part of community life in Tatums, and it is the oldest building from the town's early history that is still standing. It was added to the National Register of Historic Places in 1995.
