= Redbird, Oklahoma =

- Town
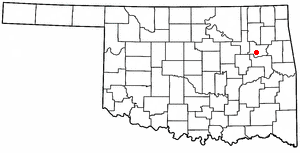
- Location of Redbird, Oklahoma
- Coordinates: 35°53′19″N 95°35′18″W
- Country: United States
- State: Oklahoma
- County: Wagoner

Area
  - Total: 0.84 sq mi (2.17 km^{2})
  - Land: 0.84 sq mi (2.17 km^{2})
  - Water: 0 sq mi (0.00 km^{2})

Population (2020)
  - Total: 89
  - Density: 106.3/sq mi (41.06/km^{2})
- Time zone: UTC-6 (Central (CST))
  - Summer (DST): UTC-5 (CDT)
- ZIP code: 74458
- Area codes: 539/918
- FIPS code: 40-62200

Redbird is a town in Wagoner County, Oklahoma, United States. As of the 2020 census, Redbird had a population of 89. Founded at the turn of the 20th century, it was one of more than fifty all-black towns in Oklahoma Territory and Indian Territory and is one of thirteen surviving black communities in Oklahoma.

== History ==
Redbird, also called Red Bird, originated with the settlement by the family of E. L. Barber, who founded the First Baptist Church in 1889. Other families soon moved into the area. By 1902, Red Bird had obtained a post office. More than 600 people showed up at the official opening of Red Bird on August 10, 1907.

The town advertised in newspapers all across the South to encourage black families to relocate there. Redbird's population attained a peak of 336 in 1920. Declining cotton prices caused residents to move away, even before the Great Depression. It rebounded after World War II, and at one point had seven churches, a couple of general stores, eight juke joints, and a gas station.

Urbanization in later years lost the town population again, and the post office closed; however, the town is experiencing something of a rebirth as families buy homes in the area to enjoy a low crime rate and a quieter pace of life.

== Geography ==
Redbird is located at 35°53′19″N 95°35′18″W (35.888676, -95.588211).

According to the United States Census Bureau, the town has a total area of 0.8 square miles (2.1 km^{2}), all land.

== Lane v. Wilson ==
I.W. Lane was denied the ability to vote in 1934, after becoming a resident of Redbird, Oklahoma in 1908. In the case Lane v. Wilson, the United States Supreme Court found a 12-day one-time voter registration window to be discriminatory for black citizens and repugnant to the Fifteenth Amendment.

== Demographics ==
Historical population
Census	Pop.	Note	%±
1920	336		—
1930	218		−35.1%
1940	393		80.3%
1950	411		4.6%
1960	310		−24.6%
1970	230		−25.8%
1980	199		−13.5%
1990	166		−16.6%
2000	153		−7.8%
2010	137		−10.5%
2020	89		−35.0%
U.S. Decennial Census

=== Racial and ethnic composition ===
Redbird town, Oklahoma – Racial and ethnic composition Note: the US Census treats Hispanic/Latino as an ethnic category. This table excludes Latinos from the racial categories and assigns them to a separate category. Hispanics/Latinos may be of any race.
Race / Ethnicity (NH = Non-Hispanic)	Pop 2000	Pop 2010	Pop 2020	% 2000	% 2010	% 2020
White alone (NH)	5	21	21	3.27%	15.33%	23.60%
Black or African American alone (NH)	134	93	41	87.58%	67.88%	46.07%
Native American or Alaska Native alone (NH)	9	2	5	5.88%	1.46%	5.62%
Asian alone (NH)	0	0	0	0.00%	0.00%	0.00%
Native Hawaiian or Pacific Islander alone (NH)	0	1	0	0.00%	0.73%	0.00%
Other race alone (NH)	0	0	1	0.00%	0.00%	1.12%
Mixed race or Multiracial (NH)	2	12	15	1.31%	8.76%	16.85%
Hispanic or Latino (any race)	3	8	6	1.96%	5.84%	6.74%
Total	153	137	89	100.00%	100.00%	100.00%

=== 2020 census ===
As of the 2020 census, Redbird had a population of 89. The median age was 54.5 years. 27.0% of residents were under the age of 18 and 24.7% of residents were 65 years of age or older. For every 100 females there were 102.3 males, and for every 100 females age 18 and over there were 109.7 males age 18 and over.

0.0% of residents lived in urban areas, while 100.0% lived in rural areas.

There were 32 households in Redbird, of which 46.9% had children under the age of 18 living in them. Of all households, 37.5% were married-couple households, 12.5% were households with a male householder and no spouse or partner present, and 46.9% were households with a female householder and no spouse or partner present. About 18.8% of all households were made up of individuals and 9.4% had someone living alone who was 65 years of age or older.

There were 39 housing units, of which 17.9% were vacant. The homeowner vacancy rate was 3.4% and the rental vacancy rate was 0.0%.

=== 2000 census ===
As of the census of 2000, there were 153 people, 64 households, and 33 families residing in the town. The population density was 185.0 inhabitants per square mile (71.4/km^{2}). There were 76 housing units at an average density of 91.9 per square mile (35.5/km^{2}). The racial makeup of the town was 87.58% African American, 5.88% Native American, 4.58% White, 0.65% from other races, and 1.31% from two or more races. Hispanic or Latino of any race were 1.96% of the population.

There were 64 households, out of which 32.8% had children under the age of 18 living with them, 23.4% were married couples living together, 18.8% had a female householder with no husband present, and 46.9% were non-families. 39.1% of all households were made up of individuals, and 17.2% had someone living alone who was 65 years of age or older. The average household size was 2.39 and the average family size was 3.26.

In the town, the population was spread out, with 33.3% under the age of 18, 11.1% from 18 to 24, 21.6% from 25 to 44, 22.2% from 45 to 64, and 11.8% who were 65 years of age or older. The median age was 32 years. For every 100 females, there were 104.0 males. For every 100 females age 18 and over, there were 72.9 males.

The median income for a household in the town was $15,139, and the median income for a family was $30,625. Males had a median income of $28,750 versus $25,833 for females. The per capita income for the town was $8,944. About 27.3% of families and 36.6% of the population were below the poverty line, including 44.6% of those under the age of eighteen and 43.5% of those 65 or over.

== Education ==
Redbird residents are assigned to schools in the Porter Consolidated Schools. The students travel 5 miles (8.0 km) to the nearest schools since Porter Consolidated does not operate any schools in Redbird. Redbird was previously served by Red Bird Public Schools.

== See also ==
- Boley, Brooksville, Clearview, Grayson, Langston, Lima, Rentiesville, Summit, Taft, Tatums, Tullahassee, and Vernon, other "All-Black" settlements that were part of the Land Run of 1889.
