= Grayson, Oklahoma =

- Town
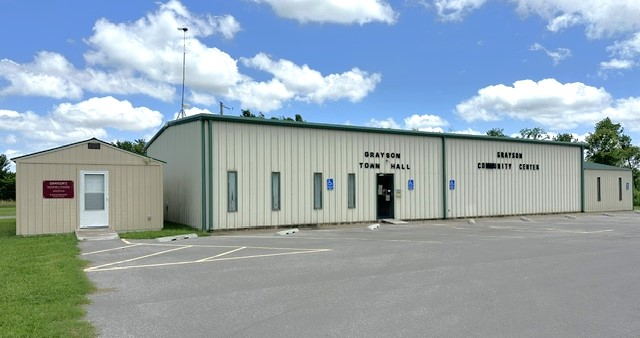
- From L-R, Grayson Visitor’s Center & Museum, Town Hall, and Community Center, June 2026

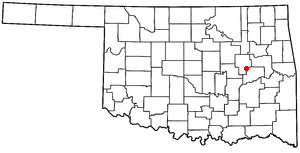
- Location of Grayson, Oklahoma
- Coordinates: 35°30′19″N 95°52′20″W
- Country: United States
- State: Oklahoma
- County: Okmulgee

Area
  - Total: 1.13 sq mi (2.92 km^{2})
  - Land: 1.13 sq mi (2.92 km^{2})
  - Water: 0 sq mi (0.00 km^{2})
- Elevation: 663 ft (202 m)

Population (2020)
  - Total: 127
  - Density: 112.6/sq mi (43.48/km^{2})
- Time zone: UTC-6 (Central (CST))
  - Summer (DST): UTC-5 (CDT)
- ZIP code: 74437
- Area codes: 539/918
- FIPS code: 40-31150
- GNIS feature ID: 2412707

Grayson is a town in Okmulgee County, Oklahoma, United States. The population was 127 at the 2020 census.

== History ==
Grayson was originally named Wildcat and was located within the area that became McIntosh County at statehood. It was named for a Muscogee chief, George W. Grayson. The name changed when Grayson's post office was established February 10, 1902, although the legal town name remained as Wildcat into the 1960s. At statehood, the town had 375 residents. It grew slightly to 411 in 1910, then began to decline.

The Encyclopedia of Oklahoma History and Culture indicates it was an “All-Black Town,” one of more than fifty identifiable towns and settlements created by African-Americans within the borders of the current State of Oklahoma from 1865 to 1920.

In 1918, the border between McIntosh and Okmulgee counties was realigned, which brought Grayson into Okmulgee County.

== Geography ==
Grayson is located approximately 11 miles (18 km) southeast of the City of Okmulgee, the Okmulgee County seat.

According to the United States Census Bureau, the town has a total area of 1.1 square miles (2.8 km^{2}), all land.

== Demographics ==
Historical population
Census	Pop.	Note	%±
1910	411		—
1920	298		−27.5%
1930	134		−55.0%
1940	188		40.3%
1950	147		−21.8%
1960	142		−3.4%
1970	142		0.0%
1980	150		5.6%
1990	66		−56.0%
2000	134		103.0%
2010	159		18.7%
2020	127		−20.1%
U.S. Decennial Census

=== Racial and ethnic composition ===
Grayson town, Oklahoma – Racial and ethnic composition Note: the US Census treats Hispanic/Latino as an ethnic category. This table excludes Latinos from the racial categories and assigns them to a separate category. Hispanics/Latinos may be of any race.
Race / Ethnicity (NH = Non-Hispanic)	Pop 2000	Pop 2010	Pop 2020	% 2000	% 2010	% 2020
White alone (NH)	13	23	17	9.70%	14.47%	13.39%
Black or African American alone (NH)	83	79	75	61.94%	49.69%	59.06%
Native American or Alaska Native alone (NH)	7	17	9	5.22%	10.69%	7.09%
Asian alone (NH)	0	0	0	0.00%	0.00%	0.00%
Native Hawaiian or Pacific Islander alone (NH)	0	0	0	0.00%	0.00%	0.00%
Other race alone (NH)	0	0	0	0.00%	0.00%	0.00%
Mixed race or Multiracial (NH)	28	34	22	20.90%	21.38%	17.32%
Hispanic or Latino (any race)	3	6	4	2.24%	3.77%	3.15%
Total	134	159	127	100.00%	100.00%	100.00%

=== 2020 census ===
As of the 2020 census, Grayson had a population of 127. The median age was 53.8 years. 19.7% of residents were under the age of 18 and 30.7% of residents were 65 years of age or older. For every 100 females there were 122.8 males, and for every 100 females age 18 and over there were 112.5 males age 18 and over.

0.0% of residents lived in urban areas, while 100.0% lived in rural areas.

There were 62 households in Grayson, of which 33.9% had children under the age of 18 living in them. Of all households, 35.5% were married-couple households, 37.1% were households with a male householder and no spouse or partner present, and 21.0% were households with a female householder and no spouse or partner present. About 25.8% of all households were made up of individuals and 11.3% had someone living alone who was 65 years of age or older.

There were 70 housing units, of which 11.4% were vacant. The homeowner vacancy rate was 0.0% and the rental vacancy rate was 0.0%.

=== 2000 census ===
As of the census of 2000, there were 134 people, 55 households, and 32 families residing in the town. The population density was 120.0 inhabitants per square mile (46.3/km^{2}). There were 57 housing units at an average density of 51.0 per square mile (19.7/km^{2}). The racial makeup of the town was 9.70% White, 61.94% African American, 5.22% Native American, 2.24% from other races, and 20.90% from two or more races. Hispanic or Latino of any race were 2.24% of the population.

There were 55 households, out of which 23.6% had children under the age of 18 living with them, 41.8% were married couples living together, 12.7% had a female householder with no husband present, and 41.8% were non-families. 36.4% of all households were made up of individuals, and 9.1% had someone living alone who was 65 years of age or older. The average household size was 2.44 and the average family size was 3.25.

In the town, the population was spread out, with 28.4% under the age of 18, 4.5% from 18 to 24, 24.6% from 25 to 44, 20.9% from 45 to 64, and 21.6% who were 65 years of age or older. The median age was 40 years. For every 100 females, there were 100.0 males. For every 100 females age 18 and over, there were 104.3 males.

The median income for a household in the town was $20,208, and the median income for a family was $24,375.

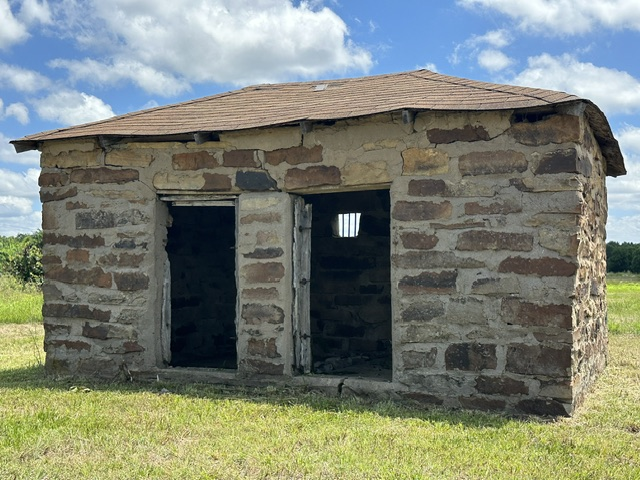
Historic Grayson Jail, NRHP-listed, in June 2026

Males had a median income of $20,250 versus $19,375 for females. The per capita income for the town was $7,688. There were 13.2% of families and 22.3% of the population living below the poverty line, including 9.5% of under eighteens and 43.3% of those over 64.

== Historic buildings ==
The historic Grayson Jail is on the National Register of Historic Places listings in Okmulgee County, Oklahoma.

The remains of the former Grayson School, attended by civil rights activist Clara Luper, are located next to the Grayson Town Hall.

== Gallery ==
Located in Grayson

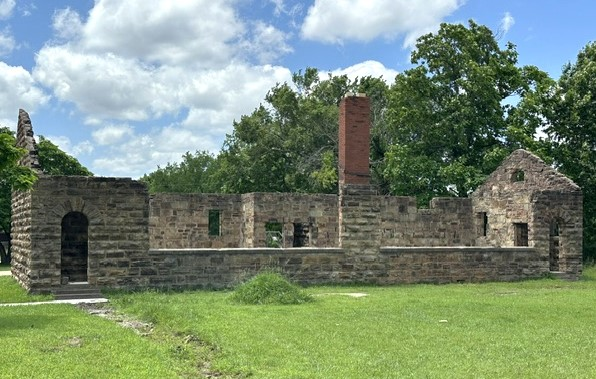
Former Grayson School in June 2026

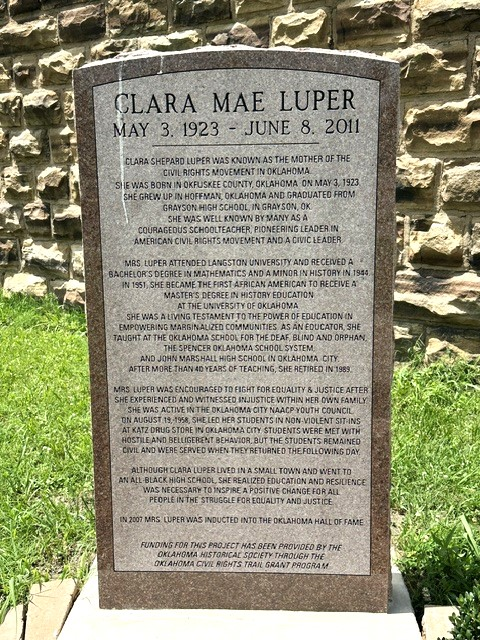
Grayson Clara Luper Marker, June 2026

== See also ==
- Boley, Brooksville, Clearview, Langston, Lima, Redbird, Rentiesville, Summit, Taft, Tatums, Tullahassee, and Vernon, other "All-Black" settlements that were part of the Land Run of 1889.
