= Langston, Oklahoma =

- Town
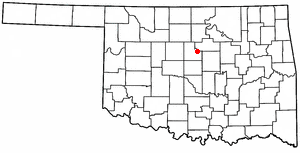
- Location of Langston, Oklahoma
- Coordinates: 35°56′21″N 97°15′28″W
- Country: United States
- State: Oklahoma
- County: Logan

Government
  - Mayor: Michael Boyles

Area
  - Total: 12.40 sq mi (32.12 km^{2})
  - Land: 11.99 sq mi (31.06 km^{2})
  - Water: 0.41 sq mi (1.06 km^{2})
- Elevation: 955 ft (291 m)

Population (2020)
  - Total: 1,619
  - Density: 135.0/sq mi (52.12/km^{2})
- Time zone: UTC-6 (Central (CST))
  - Summer (DST): UTC-5 (CDT)
- ZIP code: 73050
- Area codes: 405/572
- FIPS code: 40-41550
- GNIS feature ID: 2412877
- Website: www.cityoflangstonok.gov

Langston is a town in Logan County, Oklahoma, United States, and is part of the Oklahoma City metropolitan area. The population was 1,619 as of the 2020 United States census. Langston is home to Langston University, the only historically black college in Oklahoma.

== History ==
Langston was founded on April 22, 1890, by Edward P. McCabe, a Black American political figure from Kansas. McCabe helped lead a migration of black settlers from southern U.S. states who hoped to escape discrimination by creating a majority-black state in what was then the Territory of Oklahoma. (Note: McCabe founded of the Langston City Herald newspaper in October 1890.) He named the town for John Mercer Langston, a black member of the 51st United States Congress from Virginia. (Note: The townsite was actually owned by a white man, Charles Robbins, who surveyed and filed a plat in 1891. The Encyclopedia of Oklahoma History and Culture asserts that the two men collaborated in promoting the town.) McCabe used traveling salesmen and African-American newspapers to advertise lots for sale in Langston, and the deeds which accompanied the sale of these lots stipulated that their re-sale could only be to other African-Americans.

Langston was an all black town, one of fifty identifiable black towns and settlements created in Oklahoma between 1865 and 1920.

By 1891, Langston had a population of 200, which included a preacher, doctor, and schoolteacher. By 1892, the town had 25 businesses, with a bank and a public school. A Roman Catholic mission was established in 1893 by Bishop Theophile Meerschaert and the Benedictine Sisters. The town had a telephone system in service in 1895. In 1897, the Oklahoma Territorial Legislature passed a law creating the Colored Agricultural and Normal University at Langston (which later became Langston University).

== Geography ==
Langston is 11 miles (18 km) northeast of Guthrie, the Logan County seat, on State Highway 33.

According to the United States Census Bureau, the town has a total area of 1.9 square miles (4.9 km^{2}), all land.

== Demographics ==
Historical population
Census	Pop.	Note	%±
1900	251		—
1910	339		35.1%
1920	259		−23.6%
1930	351		35.5%
1940	514		46.4%
1950	685		33.3%
1960	136		−80.1%
1970	486		257.4%
1980	443		−8.8%
1990	1,471		232.1%
2000	1,670		13.5%
2010	1,724		3.2%
2020	1,619		−6.1%
U.S. Decennial Census

=== Racial and ethnic composition ===
Langston town, Oklahoma – Racial and ethnic composition Note: the US Census treats Hispanic/Latino as an ethnic category. This table excludes Latinos from the racial categories and assigns them to a separate category. Hispanics/Latinos may be of any race.
Race / Ethnicity (NH = Non-Hispanic)	Pop 2000	Pop 2010	Pop 2020	% 2000	% 2010	% 2020
White alone (NH)	55	44	154	3.29%	2.55%	9.51%
Black or African American alone (NH)	1,551	1,592	1,259	92.87%	92.34%	77.76%
Native American or Alaska Native alone (NH)	20	13	81	1.20%	0.75%	5.00%
Asian alone (NH)	0	7	12	0.00%	0.41%	0.74%
Native Hawaiian or Pacific Islander alone (NH)	0	2	2	0.00%	0.12%	0.12%
Other race alone (NH)	0	1	2	0.00%	0.06%	0.12%
Mixed race or Multiracial (NH)	22	30	67	1.32%	1.74%	4.14%
Hispanic or Latino (any race)	22	35	42	1.32%	2.03%	2.59%
Total	1,670	1,724	1,619	100.00%	100.00%	100.00%

=== 2020 census ===
As of the 2020 census, Langston had a population of 1,619. The median age was 20.4 years. 6.8% of residents were under the age of 18 and 5.0% of residents were 65 years of age or older. For every 100 females there were 69.4 males, and for every 100 females age 18 and over there were 69.9 males age 18 and over.

0.0% of residents lived in urban areas, while 100.0% lived in rural areas.

There were 183 households in Langston, of which 32.8% had children under the age of 18 living in them. Of all households, 36.6% were married-couple households, 28.4% were households with a male householder and no spouse or partner present, and 28.4% were households with a female householder and no spouse or partner present. About 30.1% of all households were made up of individuals and 12.0% had someone living alone who was 65 years of age or older.

There were 240 housing units, of which 23.8% were vacant. The homeowner vacancy rate was 0.0% and the rental vacancy rate was 20.9%.

=== 2000 census ===
As of the census of 2000, there were 1,670 people, 199 households, and 92 families residing in the town. The population density was 896.5 inhabitants per square mile (346.1/km^{2}). There were 246 housing units at an average density of 132.1 per square mile (51.0/km^{2}). The racial makeup of the town was 3.29% White, 93.29% African American, 1.26% Native American, 0.24% from other races, and 1.92% from two or more races. Hispanic or Latino of any race were 1.32% of the population.

There were 199 households, out of which 27.6% had children under the age of 18 living with them, 16.1% were married couples living together, 27.1% had a female householder with no husband present, and 53.3% were non-families. 37.7% of all households were made up of individuals, and 12.6% had someone living alone who was 65 years of age or older. The average household size was 2.25 and the average family size was 3.14.

In the town, the population was spread out, with 7.6% under the age of 18, 75.3% from 18 to 24, 8.4% from 25 to 44, 4.9% from 45 to 64, and 3.8% who were 65 years of age or older. The median age was 21 years. For every 100 females, there were 86.4 males. For every 100 females age 18 and over, there were 85.9 males.

The median income for a household in the town was $14,722, and the median income for a family was $26,042. Males had a median income of $23,750 versus $20,417 for females. The per capita income for the town was $17,602. About 23.5% of families and 33.8% of the population were below the poverty line, including 26.1% of those under age 18 and 40.0% of those age 65 or over.

=== Politics ===
In the 2016 presidential election, the city gave over 90% of the vote to the Democratic Party candidate Hillary Clinton. Despite Logan County voting over 70% for Republican Donald Trump, the heavy black majority in Langston carried the city for Clinton. Gary Johnson received more votes than Donald Trump in the precinct containing Langston University.

=== Historic sites ===
(Main article: National Register of Historic Places listings in Logan County, Oklahoma)

Langston has three NRHP-registered sites, being the Langston University Cottage Row Historic District at the southwest corner of the Langston campus, the Morris House at 221 Tolson Blvd., and the Ozark Trails-Indian Meridian Obelisk at the junction of Logan and East Washington avenues.

== See also ==
- Boley, Brooksville, Clearview, Grayson, Lima, Redbird, Rentiesville, Summit, Taft, Tatums, Tullahassee, and Vernon, other "All-Black" settlements that were part of the Land Run of 1889.
- Langston University
