= Dunbar Simms McLaurin =

Businessman and community organizer

Dunbar Simms McLaurin (April 6, 1920 - July 10, 1973) was a businessman, bank founder, consultant, and advocate for Black business development in the United States. He was the principal founder of Freedom National Bank.

He was born in Rentiesville, Oklahoma. He graduated from Southwestern College. He earned an M.A. from the University of Kansas, a Ph.D. from the University of Illinois, and a J.D. from Brooklyn Law School. He served in Army in World War II. Subsequently he founded the McLaurin Far East Trade Associates in Manila, an export‐import company. He restored junked military vehicles.

He was organizing Universal National Bank when he died.

== Writings ==
- An Examination of the Genesis and Nature of the Recent Reform-recovery Movement. University of Illinois. October 30, 1942.
- GHEDIPLAN; Ghetto Economic Development and Industrialization Plan. Human Resources Administration. 1968.

== See also ==
- George W. McLaurin
