= Porter Consolidated Schools =

School district in Oklahoma, United States

Porter Consolidated Schools is a school district headquartered in Porter, Oklahoma. It serves portions of Wagoner County, including Porter, Redbird, and Tullahassee.

It has two schools: an elementary school and a combined junior high school-senior high school.
