= Vernon, Oklahoma =

- Town
- Location within Oklahoma Location within the United States
- Coordinates: 35°12′54″N 95°55′48″W
- Country: United States
- State: Oklahoma
- County: McIntosh

Area
  - Total: 5.76 sq mi (14.9 km^{2})
  - Land: 5.74 sq mi (14.9 km^{2})
  - Water: 0.02 sq mi (0.052 km^{2})
- Elevation: 696 ft (212 m)

Population
  - Estimate (2023): 33
- Time zone: UTC-6 (Central (CST))
  - Summer (DST): UTC-5 (CDT)
- ZIP Codes: 74845 (Vernon); 74839 (Dustin)
- FIPS code: 40-77150
- GNIS feature ID: 2831203

Vernon is a town in McIntosh County, Oklahoma, United States. It was incorporated in 2005. Its first recorded population by the U.S. Census Bureau was an estimated 33 as of the 2023 American Community Survey.

== History ==
Vernon was platted October 4, 1910, and established in June 1911 as an all-black community. It became an incorporated town in 2005 and is one of the thirteen remaining All Black towns of Oklahoma. It was named for Bishop William Tecumseh Vernon of the African Methodist Episcopal Church.

The Fort Smith and Western Railway, which opened in 1899 and closed in 1939, operated through the town. The FS&W served major coal mining operations in eastern Oklahoma at Coal Creek, Bokoshe and McCurtain. Other towns served included Crowder, Okemah, Boley, Prague, Vernon, Indianola and Meridian. A major portion of the road's freight traffic was metallurgical-grade coal from San Bois Coal Company mines near McCurtain. However, the railroad was ultimately abandoned after the Great Depression.

A post office was established in 1912. Several postmasters presided throughout the years. Ella Woods was the first and Mrs. Tennie Baccus Dozier Walker was the last. She retired around 1991, and several temporary workers kept it open for several months, until it was finally closed when the postal service consolidated all workers under the civil service department and began eliminating and consolidating small town post offices across the state. It was originally housed in a small frame building on Broadway, until the retirement of Mrs. Woodard then was moved across the street to S. B. Dozier Sr.'s two-story rock building when Mrs. Tennie Baccus Dozier became Postmaster. The two-story rock building was built by Mr. Sim (S.B.) Dozier as a dry goods store in 1915. It was operated as such by his son George W. Dozier and his son, until Mr. S.B. Dozier's death in 1925 and his wife Indiana (India) Dozier's death in 1934. His son Crawford Dozier then operated it as a dry goods and shoe store and then a tavern. It has housed many businesses through the years with several different operators, including recreation center, Rock Front Club, a tavern and pool hall, post office, and Mr. G's Grocery Store operated by George Dozier Sr. until his death in 2000. But it was the United States Post Office longer than anything else, from 1962 to about 1994. Mrs. Tennie Baccus Dozier Walker had Billy Dozier convert it from a two-story building to the current one-story building around 1971. It is listed on the National Register of Historic Places in 1984.

The town is home to the Vernon Duty Hill Cemetery.

The town was incorporated in 2005 but was not listed as an incorporated place by the U.S. Census Bureau until 2023.

== See also ==
- Boley, Brooksville, Clearview, Grayson, Langston, Lima, Redbird, Rentiesville, Summit, Taft, Tatums, and Tullahassee, other "All-Black" settlements that were part of the Land Run of 1889.
