= Lelia Foley =

American politician (born 1942)

- Born: Lelia Kasenia Smith; November 7, 1942 (age 83); Taft, Oklahoma, U.S.
- Other name: Lelia Foley-Davis
- Occupation: Former Mayor of Taft, Oklahoma
- Known for: Described as first African American woman elected mayor in the United States
- Political party: Democratic

Lelia Foley-Davis (born November 7, 1942), formerly known as Lelia Foley, is an American politician who served as mayor of Taft, Oklahoma. Elected in 1973, she has been described as the first African-American woman elected mayor in the United States.

== Early life ==
Foley was born in the town of Taft, Oklahoma, located in Muskogee County. She went on to become a librarian at the county's courthouse, and worked to help residents of the town access affordable housing.

In January 1973, Foley, a divorced mother of five, surviving on welfare, ran for a spot on the school board of Taft, Oklahoma, an all-black town of 600 people.

She lost the election, but shortly thereafter she became inspired by a book on the successful election of A. J. Cooper as mayor of Pritchard, Alabama. Raising $200 from interested parties, she ran for the town’s top job.

== Mayor of Taft, Oklahoma ==
On April 3, 1973, the citizens of Taft elected Foley as mayor. Her election pre-dates that of Doris A. Davis, who was elected mayor of Compton, California later that year. Despite Foley being described as the first African-American woman elected mayor, The Washington Post reported in 2019 that Ellen Craig-Jones, a Black woman, was elected mayor of Urbancrest, Ohio in 1971.

In the wake of her victory, Foley conferred with Presidents Gerald Ford and Jimmy Carter. Ford anointed Foley as one of "Ten Outstanding Young Women" in 1974. In 1974, Oklahoma named Foley Outstanding Woman of the Year. As mayor, she was credited with helping secure federal Department of Housing and Urban Development funding for affordable housing initiatives.

After losing her mayoral seat in the 1980s, she continued to serve her community. Foley, now known as Lelia Foley-Davis, was once again elected mayor in 2000.

== State politics ==
In 2000, she ran for the Oklahoma House of Representatives, standing in the Democratic primary in district 13. She placed first in the initial Democratic primary vote for the seat with 35% of the vote, which became open after incumbent Bill Settle ran for Congress. However, she lost the runoff to Allan Harder by a 56% to 44% margin; Harder would narrowly lose to Republican Stuart Ericson.

In a 2018 speech at Northeastern State University, she stated that her life's dream was to run for Governor of Oklahoma. During the speech, she stated that she wished to meet then-President Donald Trump to tell him "Leave the Dreamers alone".

== Legacy and recognition ==
In June 2022, a portion of a street in Taft, Oklahoma was renamed Lelia Foley-Davis Avenue in her honor. Foley stated in 2018 that she wishes to Lelia Foley-Davis Foundation.

== See also ==
- List of first African-American mayors
