= Taft, Oklahoma =

- Town
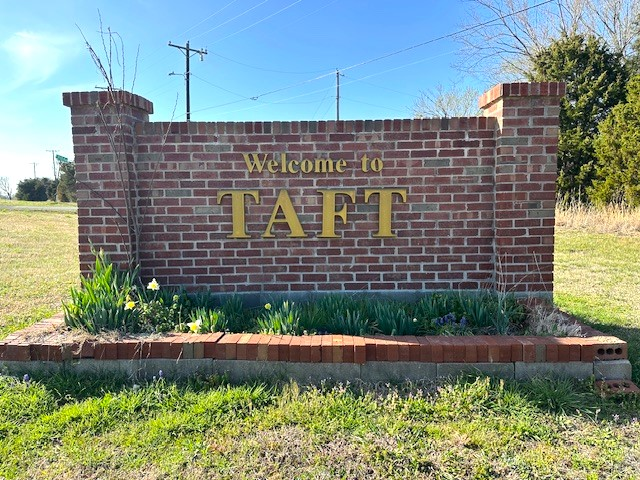
- Welcome sign to Taft, 3-2026

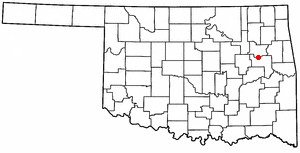
- Location in Oklahoma
- Coordinates: 35°45′39″N 95°32′44″W
- Country: United States
- State: Oklahoma
- County: Muskogee

Area
  - Total: 1.56 sq mi (4.03 km^{2})
  - Land: 1.55 sq mi (4.02 km^{2})
  - Water: 0.0039 sq mi (0.01 km^{2})
- Elevation: 591 ft (180 m)

Population (2020)
  - Total: 174
  - Density: 112.2/sq mi (43.32/km^{2})
- Time zone: UTC-6 (Central (CST))
  - Summer (DST): UTC-5 (CDT)
- ZIP Code: 74463
- Area codes: 539/918
- FIPS code: 40-72050
- GNIS feature ID: 2413361
- Website: www.taftok.gov

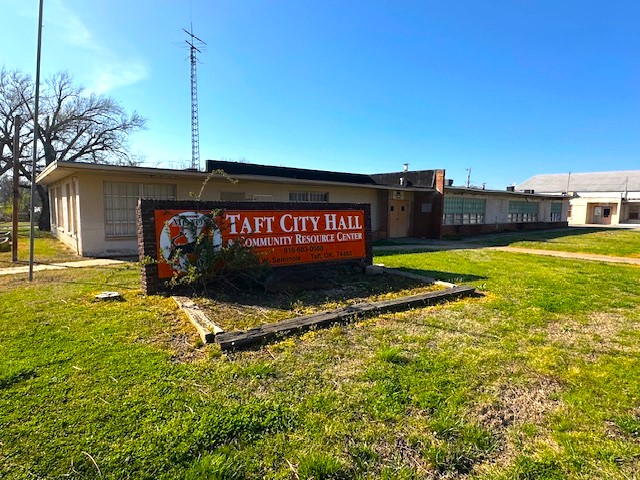
Taft City Hall in March of 2026

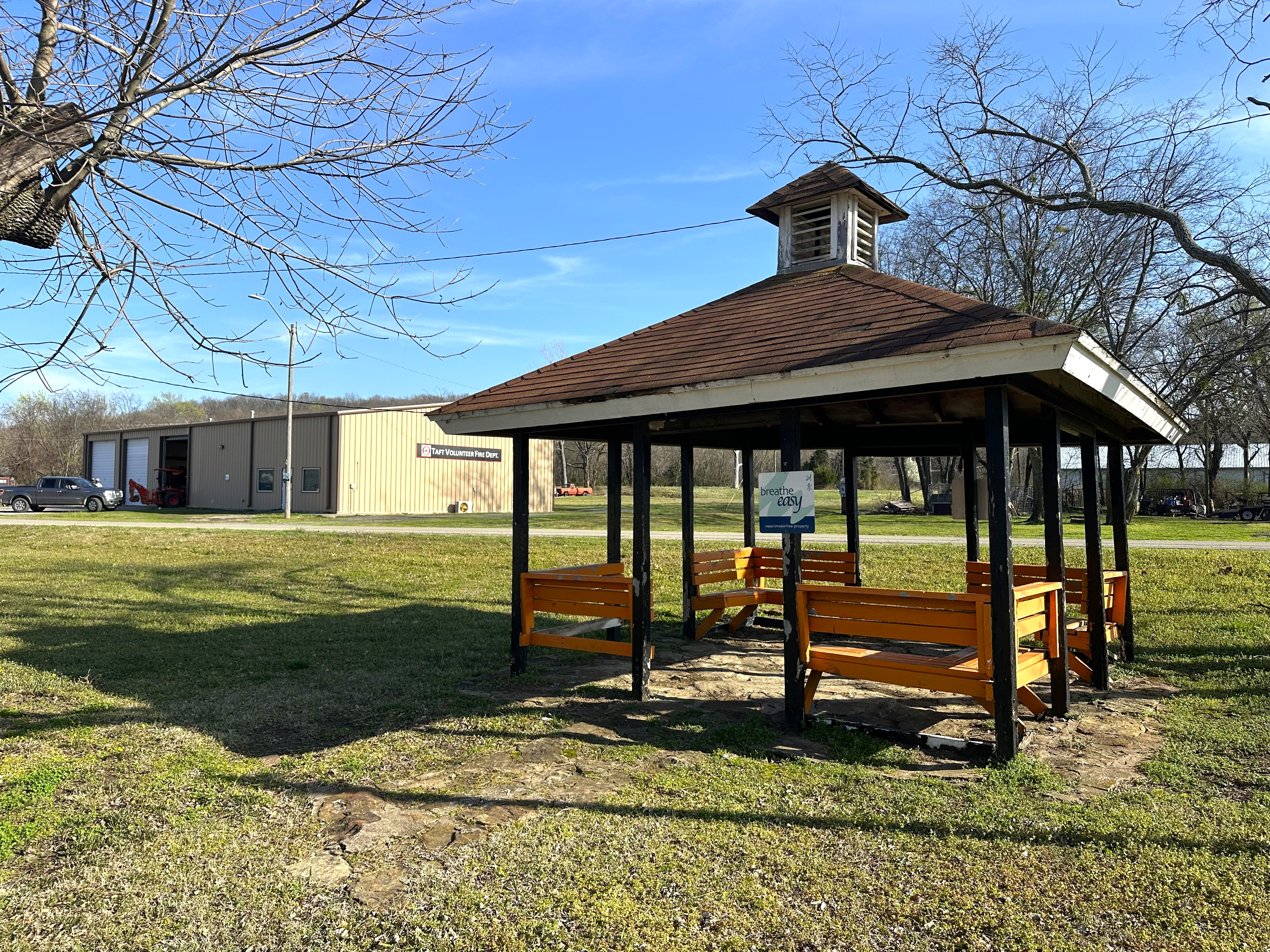
Gazebo in Taft with Taft Volunteer Fire Dept. in background, March 2026

Taft is a town in Muskogee County, Oklahoma, United States. The population was 174 as of the 2020 Census, down from 250 in 2010. The locale began as an all-black town on land allotted to Creek Freedmen. It is named for President William Howard Taft.

== History ==
This community began as an all-black town on land allotted to freedmen of the Muscogee (Creek) Nation. It was originally named "Twine", for William H. Twine, and had a post office by 1902. Mr. Twine moved to Muskogee, and the citizens voted to rename the town "Taft", for William Howard Taft, who was then Secretary of War in the Theodore Roosevelt administration.

Educational and correctional facilities have long been the town's leading employers. These have included the W. T. Vernon School (1908), the Industrial Institute for the Deaf, Blind, and Orphans of the Colored Race (1909), Moton High School, and the State Training School for Negro Girls.

Taft contains two penitentiaries: Dr. Eddie Warrior Correctional Center, for women, and Jess Dunn Correctional Center, for men.

In April 1973, Lelia Foley was elected as mayor of Taft, becoming one of the African-American women elected as mayor in the United States.

A mass shooting incident occurred at an outdoor Memorial Day event in Taft, shortly after midnight on May 29, 2022. Seven people were reported to be injured, with a 39-year-old woman killed. Media accounts say that this incident was one of at least 12 mass shooting events that occurred over the Memorial Day weekend across the United States. 26-year-old Skyler Buckner was charged in connection with the shooting.

== Geography ==
Taft is in northwestern Muskogee County, approximately 10 miles (16 km) west of Muskogee, the county seat. It is less than 2 miles (3 km) south of the Arkansas River.

According to the U.S. Census Bureau, the town has a total area of 1.55 square miles (4.01 km^{2}), of which 0.006 square miles (0.016 km^{2}), or 0.39%, are water.

== Demographics ==
Historical population
Census	Pop.	Note	%±
1910	352		—
1920	553		57.1%
1930	690		24.8%
1940	772		11.9%
1950	541		−29.9%
1960	386		−28.7%
1970	525		36.0%
1980	489		−6.9%
1990	400		−18.2%
2000	349		−12.7%
2010	250		−28.4%
2020	174		−30.4%
U.S. Decennial Census

=== Racial and ethnic composition ===
Taft town, Oklahoma – Racial and ethnic composition Note: the US Census treats Hispanic/Latino as an ethnic category. This table excludes Latinos from the racial categories and assigns them to a separate category. Hispanics/Latinos may be of any race.
Race / Ethnicity (NH = Non-Hispanic)	Pop 2000	Pop 2010	Pop 2020	% 2000	% 2010	% 2020
White alone (NH)	13	16	14	3.72%	6.40%	8.05%
Black or African American alone (NH)	297	205	137	85.10%	82.00%	78.74%
Native American or Alaska Native alone (NH)	4	8	9	1.15%	3.20%	5.17%
Asian alone (NH)	0	0	0	0.00%	0.00%	0.00%
Native Hawaiian or Pacific Islander alone (NH)	0	0	0	0.00%	0.00%	0.00%
Other race alone (NH)	0	0	0	0.00%	0.00%	0.00%
Mixed race or Multiracial (NH)	33	9	13	9.46%	3.60%	7.47%
Hispanic or Latino (any race)	2	12	1	0.57%	4.80%	0.57%
Total	349	250	174	100.00%	100.00%	100.00%

=== 2020 census ===
As of the 2020 census, Taft had a population of 174. The median age was 51.5 years. 16.7% of residents were under the age of 18 and 29.9% of residents were 65 years of age or older. For every 100 females there were 87.1 males, and for every 100 females age 18 and over there were 79.0 males age 18 and over.

0.0% of residents lived in urban areas, while 100.0% lived in rural areas.

There were 84 households in Taft, of which 33.3% had children under the age of 18 living in them. Of all households, 33.3% were married-couple households, 19.0% were households with a male householder and no spouse or partner present, and 44.0% were households with a female householder and no spouse or partner present. About 27.4% of all households were made up of individuals and 19.1% had someone living alone who was 65 years of age or older.

There were 97 housing units, of which 13.4% were vacant. The homeowner vacancy rate was 0.0% and the rental vacancy rate was 18.9%.

=== 2000 census ===
As of the census of 2000, there were 349 people, 136 households, and 87 families residing in the town. The population density was 227.8 inhabitants per square mile (88.0/km^{2}). There were 155 housing units at an average density of 101.2 per square mile (39.1/km^{2}). The racial makeup of the town was 85.39% African American, 3.72% White, 1.15% Native American, 0.29% from other races, and 9.46% from two or more races. Hispanic or Latino of any race were 0.57% of the population.

There were 136 households, out of which 33.1% had children under the age of 18 living with them, 36.0% were married couples living together, 23.5% had a female householder with no husband present, and 35.3% were non-families. 31.6% of all households were made up of individuals, and 12.5% had someone living alone who was 65 years of age or older. The average household size was 2.57 and the average family size was 3.30.

In the town, the population was spread out, with 35.0% under the age of 18, 7.2% from 18 to 24, 20.1% from 25 to 44, 19.8% from 45 to 64, and 18.1% who were 65 years of age or older. The median age was 36 years. For every 100 females, there were 75.4 males. For every 100 females age 18 and over, there were 65.7 males.

The median income for a household in the town was $18,889, and the median income for a family was $26,500. Males had a median income of $20,417 versus $17,813 for females. The per capita income for the town was $11,278. About 23.0% of families and 33.7% of the population were below the poverty line, including 44.4% of those under age 18 and 18.8% of those age 65 or over.

== Notable people ==
- Sarah Rector, once called the "world's richest Negro girl" because of oil wealth off her Creek Freedmen allotment, was born and grew up in and around Taft.

== See also ==
- Boley, Brooksville, Clearview, Grayson, Langston, Lima, Redbird, Rentiesville, Summit, Tatums, Tullahassee, and Vernon, other "All-Black" settlements that were part of the Land Run of 1889.
