= Tullahassee, Oklahoma =

Tullahassee, Oklahoma Creek: Tvlvhasse
- Town
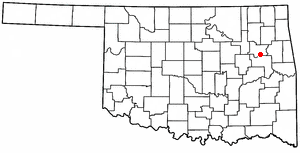
- Location of Tullahassee, Oklahoma
- Coordinates: 35°50′16″N 95°26′21″W
- Country: United States
- State: Oklahoma
- County: Wagoner

Government
  - Mayor: Keisha Currin

Area
  - Total: 1.82 sq mi (4.71 km^{2})
  - Land: 1.82 sq mi (4.71 km^{2})
  - Water: 0 sq mi (0.00 km^{2})
- Elevation: 620 ft (189 m)

Population (2020)
  - Total: 83
  - Density: 45.7/sq mi (17.63/km^{2})
- Time zone: UTC-6 (Central (CST))
  - Summer (DST): UTC-5 (CDT)
- ZIP code: 74454
- Area codes: 539/918
- FIPS code: 40-74650
- GNIS feature ID: 1099007
- Website: tullahasseeok.com

Tullahassee (Creek: Tvlvhasse) is a town in Wagoner County, Oklahoma, United States. As of the 2020 census, Tullahassee had a population of 83. It was the location of Tullahassee Mission, an Indian boarding school that burned in 1880. Because their population in the community had declined, the Muscogee Creek gave the school to Creek Freedmen, paying to replace the main building, and relocated with their families to the area of Wealaka Mission.

Tullahassee is considered the oldest of the surviving all-black towns in former Indian Territory. By 1880 Creek Freedmen and their descendants dominated the community population.

== History ==
The town began in 1850, when the Creek Nation approved the Tullahassee Mission School at this site on the Texas Road. It was founded by Robert McGill Loughridge, a Presbyterian minister who had been serving in the Creek Nation since 1843 and had founded another mission that year.

In the years before the Emancipation Proclamation, many Creek citizens of the town had Black slaves. In the early 1880s, the population of freedmen had increased in the area, while the number of Muscogee Creek had declined. The freedmen were formerly enslaved African Americans and their descendants who were emancipated and granted citizenship in the Creek Nation after the American Civil War. Some also had Creek ancestry.

After a destructive fire at the school, the Creek Council decided to relocate most of their people, and transferred the Creek children to Wealaka Mission. They gave the school and community of Tullahassee to the freedmen in 1881. The Creek paid to have the school's main building replaced.

The residents opened a post office in 1899, and the town was incorporated in 1902. The Tullahassee Town Site Company was established to aid developing the town, and it both platted the town in 1907 and recruited black residents from throughout the post-Reconstruction South, where Jim Crow oppression was increasing. A. J. Mason served as president and L. C. Hardridge as secretary. This is now the oldest of the 13 surviving all-Black towns in the state, which were established during the period of Indian Territory. At one time there were 50 all-black towns.

The A. J. Mason Building is listed in the National Register of Historic Places (NR 85001743). Carter G. Woodson School, named for a prominent black historian, is listed in the Oklahoma Landmarks Inventory, and noted for its link to African-American history.

In 1914, the African Methodist Episcopal Church (AME) opened Flipper-Key-Davis College, also called Flipper-Davis, in the former Tullahassee Mission building. It was a period when private, municipal and state junior colleges were being founded. Flipper-Davis College was then the only private, higher-level education institution for African Americans in Oklahoma. This junior college closed in 1935 during the Great Depression.

In June 2021, Tullahassee Mayor Keisha Cullin was one of 11 mayors to form MORE (Mayors Organized for Reparations and Equity), a coalition of mayors who promised to create reparation pilot programs in their municipalities. Other members of MORE included the mayors of such large cities as Los Angeles, Denver, Sacramento, and Kansas City, Missouri.

== Geography ==
Tullahassee is located at 35°50′16″N 95°26′21″W (35.837758, -95.439295). It is 5 miles (8.0 km) northwest of Muskogee.

According to the United States Census Bureau, the town has a total area of 0.5 square miles (1.3 km^{2}), all land.

== Demographics ==
Historical population
Census	Pop.	Note	%±
1920	189		—
1930	164		−13.2%
1940	200		22.0%
1950	209		4.5%
1960	199		−4.8%
1970	183		−8.0%
1980	145		−20.8%
1990	92		−36.6%
2000	105		14.1%
2010	106		1.0%
2020	83		−21.7%
U.S. Decennial Census

=== Racial and ethnic composition ===
Tullahassee town, Oklahoma – Racial and ethnic composition Note: the US Census treats Hispanic/Latino as an ethnic category. This table excludes Latinos from the racial categories and assigns them to a separate category. Hispanics/Latinos may be of any race.
Race / Ethnicity (NH = Non-Hispanic)	Pop 2000	Pop 2010	Pop 2020	% 2000	% 2010	% 2020
White alone (NH)	30	23	20	28.30%	21.70%	24.10%
Black or African American alone (NH)	71	67	27	66.98%	63.21%	32.53%
Native American or Alaska Native alone (NH)	1	9	17	0.94%	8.49%	20.48%
Asian alone (NH)	0	0	1	0.00%	0.00%	1.20%
Native Hawaiian or Pacific Islander alone (NH)	0	0	0	0.00%	0.00%	0.00%
Other race alone (NH)	0	0	0	0.00%	0.00%	0.00%
Mixed race or Multiracial (NH)	4	7	17	3.77%	6.60%	20.48%
Hispanic or Latino (any race)	0	0	1	0.00%	0.00%	1.20%
Total	106	106	83	100.00%	100.00%	100.00%

=== 2020 census ===
As of the 2020 census, Tullahassee had a population of 83. The median age was 53.3 years. 15.7% of residents were under the age of 18 and 25.3% of residents were 65 years of age or older. For every 100 females there were 144.1 males, and for every 100 females age 18 and over there were 141.4 males age 18 and over.

0.0% of residents lived in urban areas, while 100.0% lived in rural areas.

There were 30 households in Tullahassee, of which 40.0% had children under the age of 18 living in them. Of all households, 33.3% were married-couple households, 23.3% were households with a male householder and no spouse or partner present, and 30.0% were households with a female householder and no spouse or partner present. About 20.0% of all households were made up of individuals and 10.0% had someone living alone who was 65 years of age or older.

There were 41 housing units, of which 26.8% were vacant. The homeowner vacancy rate was 0.0% and the rental vacancy rate was 0.0%.

== =2000 census ==
As of the census of 2000, there were 106 people, 39 households, and 24 families residing in the town. The population density was 200.4 inhabitants per square mile (77.4/km^{2}). There were 49 housing units at an average density of 92.6 per square mile (35.8/km^{2}). The racial makeup of the town was 66.98% African American, 28.30% White, 0.94% Native American, and 3.77% from two or more races.

There were 39 households, out of which 17.9% had children under the age of 18 living with them, 38.5% were married couples living together, 20.5% had a female householder with no husband present, and 35.9% were non-families. 30.8% of all households were made up of individuals, and 15.4% had someone living alone who was 65 years of age or older. The average household size was 2.72 and the average family size was 3.40.

In the town, the population was spread out, with 25.5% under the age of 18, 9.4% from 18 to 24, 22.6% from 25 to 44, 27.4% from 45 to 64, and 15.1% who were 65 years of age or older. The median age was 38 years. For every 100 females, there were 116.3 males. For every 100 females age 18 and over, there were 92.7 males.

The median income for a household in the town was $14,750, and the median income for a family was $13,750. Males had a median income of $21,875 versus $12,500 for females. The per capita income for the town was $8,537. There were 42.3% of families and 58.9% of the population living below the poverty line, including 94.0% of under eighteens and 22.2% of those over 64.

=== 2022 American Community Survey ===
According to the most recent American Community Survey, the racial makeup of the town was 27.40% African American, 22.6% White, 6.16% Native American, and 43.84% from two or more races.

== Education ==
Students are zoned to Porter Consolidated Schools.

=== Tullahassee Manual Labor School ===
The Tullahassee Manual Labor School, located in Tullahassee, Oklahoma was originally used as a Creek boarding school and became a school for Creek Freedmen to gain education beyond an elementary school level. The institution was one of very few designated for Creek Freedmen and operated as such from 1883 to until it was sold to Waggoner County in 1914.

Tullahassee Manual Labor School opened initially in 1850 as a school for Creek children, the school began operation in 1850 until a fire destroyed the building in 1880. The fire created an opportunity for the Creek children to be transferred to a different school, leaving the dilapidated building along with its 100 acres to be offered to the Creek Freedmen population in the area. Tullahassee Manual Labor School was reopened in 1883 primarily serving Creek Freedmen in Tullahassee. After Oklahoma gained statehood, it was owned by the government until 1914 when it was sold to Waggoner County and became Flipper Key Davis College, an institution primarily serving African Americans. As of today, Flipper Key Davis College is no longer in operation.

== See also ==
- Boley, Brooksville, Clearview, Grayson, Langston, Lima, Redbird, Rentiesville, Summit, Taft, Tatums, and Vernon, other "All-Black" settlements that resulted from the Land Run of 1889 in Indian Territory.
