= Boley, Oklahoma =

- Town
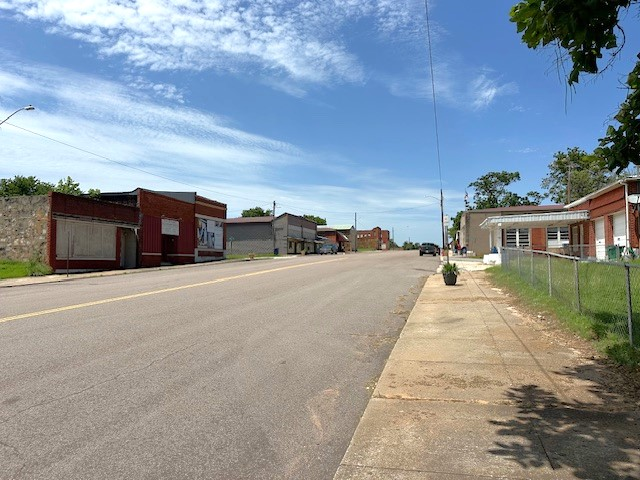
- Downtown Boley, July 2025

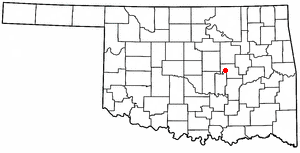
- Location of Boley, Oklahoma
- Coordinates: 35°29′26″N 96°28′46″W
- Country: United States
- State: Oklahoma
- County: Okfuskee
- Incorporated: May 10, 1905

Area
  - Total: 1.62 sq mi (4.19 km^{2})
  - Land: 1.61 sq mi (4.18 km^{2})
  - Water: 0.0039 sq mi (0.01 km^{2})
- Elevation: 860 ft (260 m)

Population (2020)
  - Total: 1,091
  - Density: 680/sq mi (261/km^{2})
- Time zone: UTC-6 (Central (CST))
  - Summer (DST): UTC-5 (CDT)
- ZIP code: 74829
- Area codes: 539/918
- FIPS code: 40-07500
- GNIS feature ID: 2411705
- Website: cityofboley.org

Boley is a town in Okfuskee County, Oklahoma, United States. The population was 1,091 at the 2020 Census. Boley was incorporated in 1905 as a predominantly Black pioneer town with persons having Native American ancestry among its citizens. Of the 50 identifiable Black towns established in Oklahoma between 1865 to 1920, Boley is one of only 13 still in existence.

Boley is currently home to barbeque equipment maker, Smokaroma, Inc, and the John Lilley Correctional Center. The Boley Public School District closed the high school in 2007 and the elementary in 2010 due to declining enrollment. The Boley Historic District is a National Historic Landmark. Currently Boley hosts The Annual Boley Rodeo & Bar-B-Que Festival.

== History ==
=== Background ===
Creek Freedmen in the Indian Territory, who were the descendants of Black slaves held by the Creek tribe and allotted 160 acres of land each as a result of the Dawes Commission, set up independent townships, of which Boley was one. The town was established on land owned by Abigail Barnett, the daughter of a Creek Freedman.

As Boley and its surrounding area already possessed a well-established and independent Black community, many Black Southerners who eventually emigrated there perceived the town as a safe haven from the South's limited economic opportunities, white supremacist paramilitaries (e.g. White League, Red Shirts, and the Ku Klux Klan), and discriminatory laws re-imposed at the collapse of Reconstruction.

=== Town founding ===
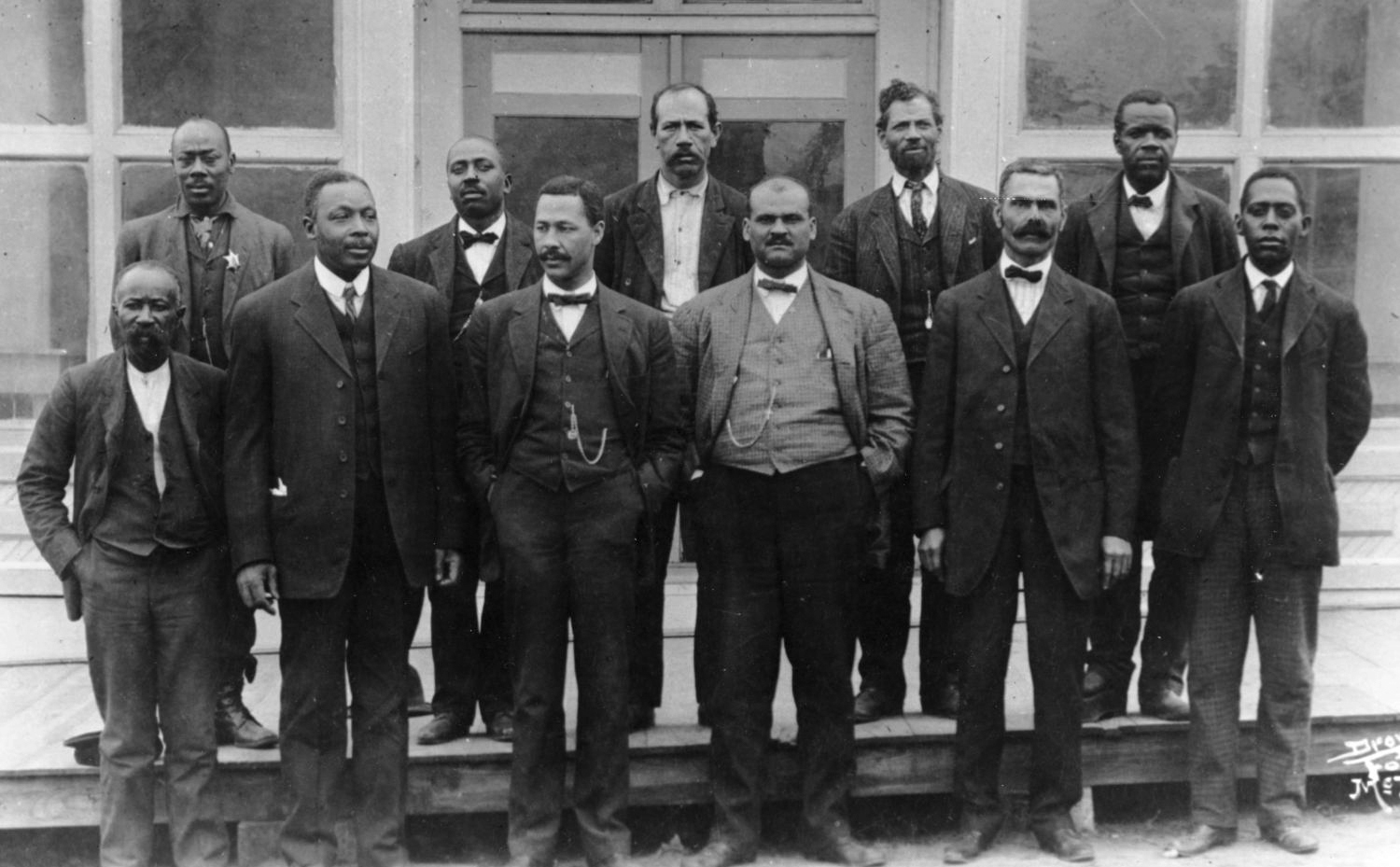
Boley town council c. 1907. Thomas Haynes, wearing the light colored jacket, is in the first row, third from the right. Standing beside Haynes, with his hands in his pockets, is David Turner.

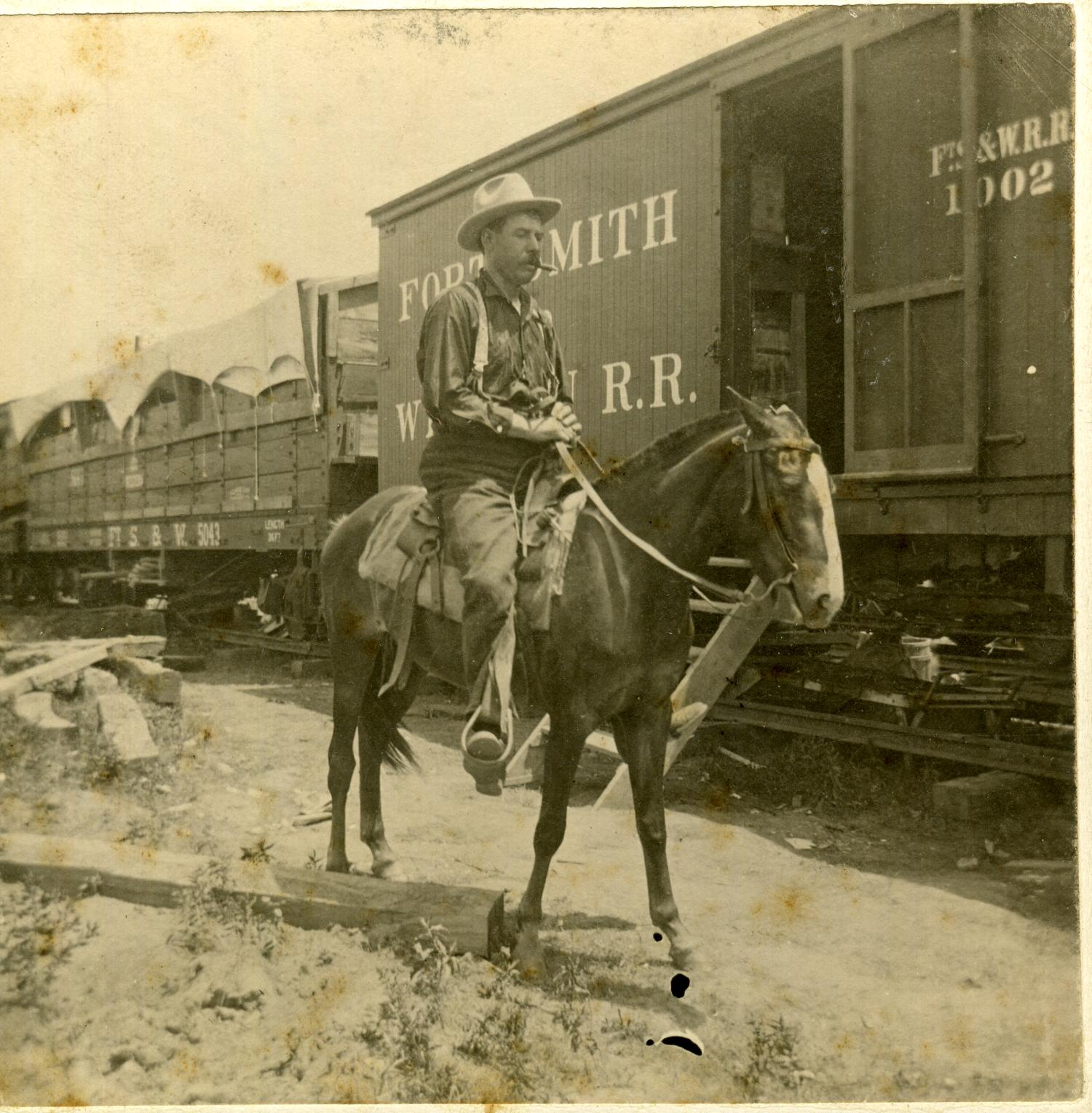
Photograph of J. B. Boley c. 1902.

The principal founder of Boley was Thomas M. Haynes. Lake Moore, a white speculator, contributed the initial $500 investment needed to lease Barnett's land for five years. Another influential figure was the town's namesake, J. B. Boley, a white official of the Fort Smith & Western Railroad who oversaw the development of a depot in the middle of Boley. After being approved for a post office two months prior in July, the town officially opened for settlement on September 26, 1903.

One of the most influential early settlers in Boley was David J. Turner, a businessman who would, besides serving as town mayor and councilman on multiple occasions, also work as a bank president and pharmacist. Another important settler was Hilliard Taylor, who developed a thriving cotton ginning business.

The development of the railroad brought traffic and allowed agricultural land to be more profitably used as a townsite. Property owned by the Barnett family, among other Creek Freedmen, was midway between Paden and Castle, and ideal for a station stop. With the approval of the railroad management, Boley, Creek Nation, Indian Territory was incorporated in 1905. During the early part of the 20th century, Boley became a regional business hub and one of the wealthiest Black towns in the US. It boasted two banks, including the first nationally-chartered Black-owned bank, three cotton gins, its own electric company, a movie theater, hotels, and multiple legal and dentistry practices. The town had over 4,000 residents by 1911, and was the home of two colleges: Creek-Seminole College, and Methodist Episcopal College. The Masonic Lodge was called "the tallest building between Okmulgee and Oklahoma City," when it was built in 1912.

=== O. H. Bradley and The Boley Progress ===
We in the Creek Nation especially in and around Boley speak boastfully of our liberty, our opportunities, our prosperity and advancement, we are really free, we are truly prosperous . . . and are enjoying all the rights and privileges accorded every other American citizen in the broadest term. . . . COME AND SEE.

— O. H. Bradley, Boley Progress (March 23, 1905)

One of the town's largest weekly newspapers, The Boley Progress, was established in 1905. It promoted the town to African Americans in the American South, and specialized in reporting Southern news. In its debut issue, the Progress coined Boley the "Haven of the Negro." An annual subscription initially cost $1.

Under the editorship of Oniel H. Bradley, the motto of the Progress was "All Men Up, Not Some Down." Bradley promoted an "emancipationist vision" of Boley, portraying the town as a place where Black southerners could escape discrimination and finally enjoy a real freedom to serve as "business men, farmers, merchants, and wage workers," free from the antagonism of hostile white mobs. Additionally, Bradley believed that flourishing and well-governed black towns like Boley would help alleviate the nation's "racial problem" and counter negative stereotypes of Black Americans. Subscribers across the South were informed about Boley's local economy, population growth, political elections, investment opportunities, and more. As a result of his promotional efforts, Bradley attracted Black settlers from diverse social backgrounds, ranging from farmers to college-educated professionals.

In the fall of 1905, Bradley's Progress persuaded Joe P. Thompson, a devout reader from Rusk, Texas, to organize an emigration of approximately fifty Black families from his community to the area around Boley. Reflecting upon Boley's ballooning growth in its initial years, early settler Hallie Smith Jones remarked that "people came to Boley by train loads. In some instances eight and ten families would alight from the same train. Their luggage would fill the depot platform and would be piled six and seven feet high."

=== Womanhood in Boley ===
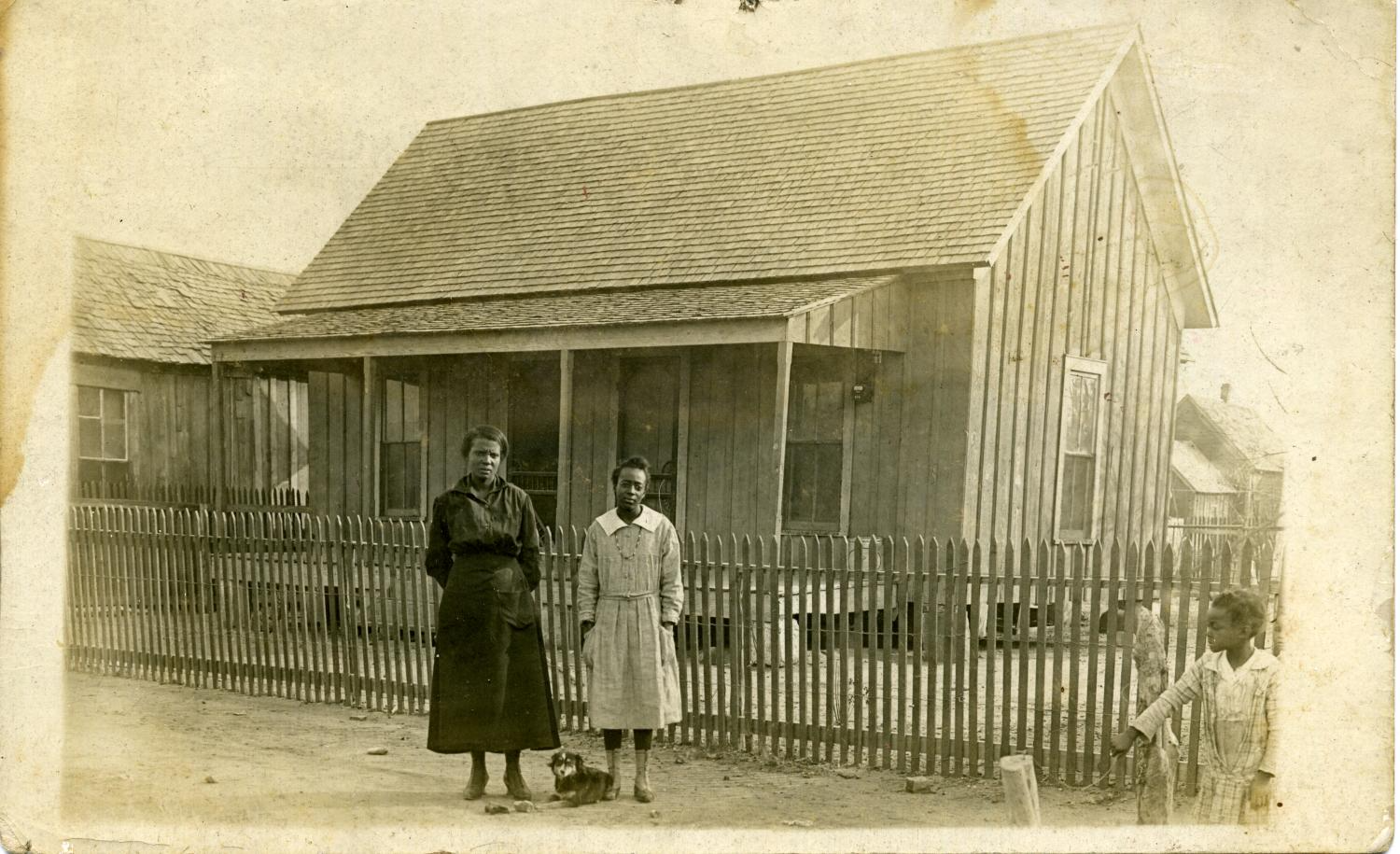
Three unidentified women in Boley c. 1918.

Black women served many valuable roles within the town, such as entrepreneurs, farmers, schoolteachers, tours guides for prospective settlers, and, of course, as loyal wives and mothers rearing future generations of Black children.

Single-sex (women-exclusive) organizations committed to progressive principles sprouted up in Boley. For instance, the Ladies Industrial Club, founded in October 1908, was involved in various community service projects, playing a significant role in the creation of the town's public library. California M. Taylor, who was renowned for her work as a notary public and later as a pharmacist, was an influential leader in Boley's NAACP branch.

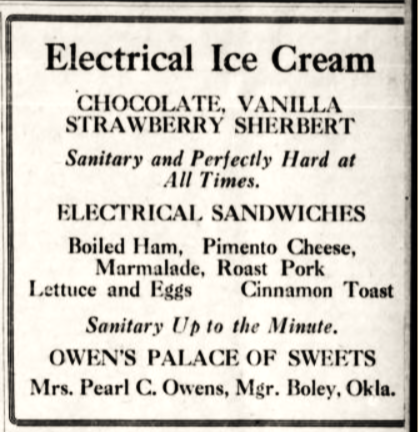
Advertisement in the April 1, 1926 issue of The Boley Progress placed by businesswoman Pearl C. Owens

=== Black self-sufficiency ===
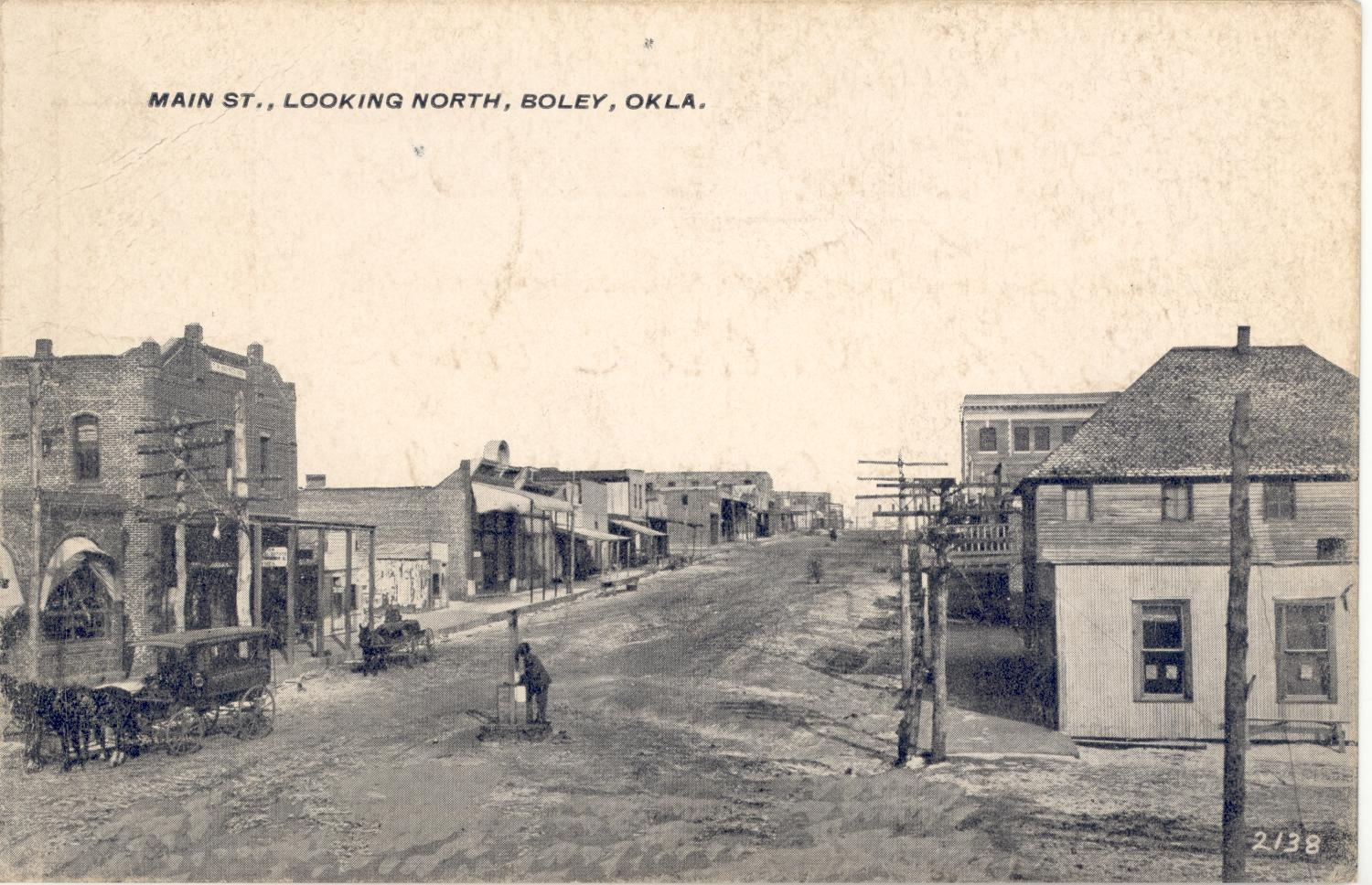
Main Street, facing north.

Booker T. Washington visited Boley in 1905, and was so impressed that he included Boley in his speeches; black-towns like Boley embodied "the path of advancement," as they provided opportunities for self-governance, moral upliftment, and the development of useful leadership and industrial skills. However, he also worried that separation from whites, if carried to the extreme, would be detrimental to black communities in the long-run. George Washington Carver once called Boley "the most progressive black town in the U.S."

Boley became notorious for its sundown town signage, subverting whites-only norms, for reading, "White man, don't let the sun set on you here." The sign was removed by federal agents in 1924.

=== Disenfranchisement and racial tensions ===
Say have you heard the story
Of the little Colored town;
Way over in the Nation
On such lovely sloping ground?
With as pretty little houses
As you ever chanced to meet,
With not a thing but Colored folks
A standing on the streets?
O ‘tis a pretty country
And the Negroes own it too;
With not a single white man here
To tell us what to do
In Boley.

— E. J. Pinkett, Boley Progress (May 11, 1905)

Upon becoming the 46th U.S. state on November 16, 1907, Jim Crow segregation laws were added to Oklahoma's state constitution, largely due to the efforts of white Democrat William H. Murray Shortly after statehood came disenfranchisement, most significantly through the passing of a "grandfather clause" which stipulated that anyone whose ancestors lacked the right to vote prior to 1866 (i.e. slaves) would be subject to a literacy test. Historically, the solidly-Republican black population of Boley held the balance of political power in Okfuscee County, as nearby white towns were split between the two parties.

In mid-1911, within the tense atmosphere generated by the lynching of Laura and L.D. Nelson in the nearby town of Okemah, the county seat of Okfuskee County, a rumor circulated that the black residents in and around Boley were arming themselves to conduct a retaliatory attack. During the night of the predicted engagement, the white citizens of Okemah developed an elaborate defense system and prepared for battle. However, no fighting ever occurred, presumably because Boley's black community had hunkered down themselves to protect their town.

In October 1911, a "State Convention of Black Men and Women" was hosted in Boley, organized by local black clergymen. The conservative, central message of the meeting was to advocate to neighboring white communities the specific distinction between Blacks who possess "respectable standing in his community" and those who embody the "vicious element of the race." In an attempt to sooth racial tensions and prevent future mob violence, the convention sought to convince white audiences that the law-abiding Black middle-class would be willing to join arms with their white neighbors in condemning the lowly Black "criminal."

=== 1932 bank raid of Pretty Boy Floyd's gang ===
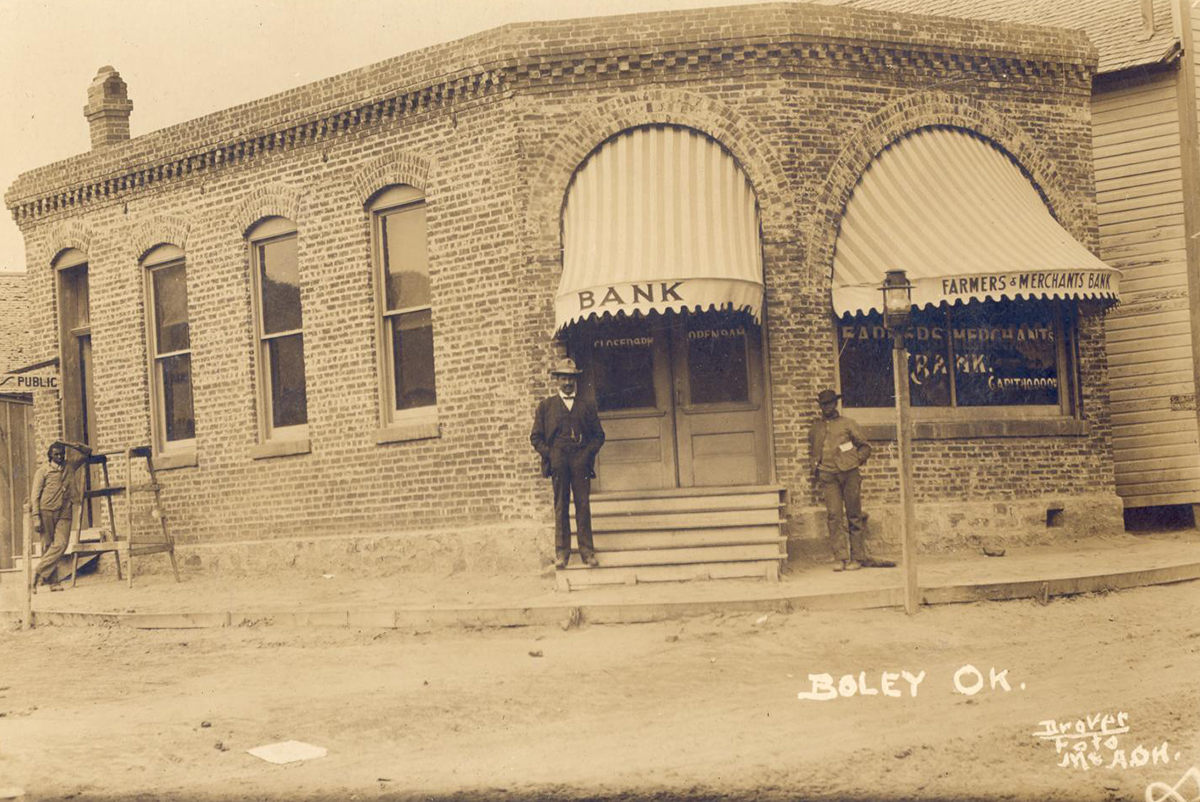
David Turner standing on the steps of the Farmers and Merchants Bank, the first Black-owned bank with a national charter in the U.S.

In November 1932, three members belonging to the gang of the notorious outlaw Pretty Boy Floyd attempted to rob Boley's Farmers and Merchants Bank, but were thwarted by the town's citizens. Floyd had previously warned his men not to attack Boley due to its residents being well-armed, but the interracial trio ignored the message.

George Birdwell, the trio's ringleader, and C.C. Patterson broke into the bank while Charles "Pete" Glass, a Black man who knew the town, waited in the getaway vehicle. While Birdwell and Patterson emptied the register of all cash, the bank's president, David Turner, who was on duty at the time, sounded the alarm to alert the townspeople. Herbert C. McCormick, an assistant cashier who had been hiding in the bank vault with a rifle, then proceeded to shoot Birdwell. Birdwell managed to fire multiple shots into Turner before collapsing onto the bank's floor. However, the chronology of what transpired inside the bank is not completely clear, as some accounts contend that an infuriated Birdwell shot Turner after discovering that he had pulled the alarm, which then caused McCormick to open fire on Birdwell.

Patterson shuffled out of the bank and attempted to flee to the getaway vehicle, but he had now come face-to-face with Boley's armed citizenry, who had grabbed whatever weapons they could find, including guns, screwdrivers, and tools. Though Patterson was "riddled with bullets," he miraculously survived and was arrested by Boley sheriff Joseph Langston McCormick, the brother of the bank worker who had shot Birdwell. Glass, hearing the gunfire, had exited the car and made his way towards the bank to help his fellow bandits, but upon seeing Patterson collapse from his wounds, desperately scrambled back towards the vehicle. While attempting to drive away, Glass was shot dead. The townspeople had successfully foiled the attempted heist.

One now sees that George Birdwell died on two different days in two different years in three different towns from four fatal wounds in four different parts of his body, all caused by a single bullet fired from three (or possibly four) different weapons...all of this occurring either before or after Birdwell shot the bank president four or six or [as one witnessed claimed] not at all.

— William Savage Jr., Chronicles of Oklahoma (2003)

David Turner, who had dedicated decades of his life towards Boley's development, perished in the arms of his wife as he was in transit to the hospital in Okemah. Now the Governor of Oklahoma, William H. Murray, the very same man who sought to destroy the independence of Black-towns like Boley decades prior, sent his official condolences; thousands of people from around the state went to Boley to attend Turner's funeral. The Farmers and Merchants Bank was closed shortly thereafter.

As historian William Savage Jr. notes, several conflicting narratives of the robbery attempt had unfortunately sprung up in the ensuing decades, demonstrating the shortcomings of relying upon human recollection. The most egregious differences in accounts relate to how Birdwell died (including how many times he was shot and by whom) and the details about what specific gun Herbert McCormick used.

=== Decline ===
Boley's development paralleled that of the Fort Smith & Western Railway, which went bankrupt during the Great Depression and ceased operations in 1939. Additionally, Boley's economy was heavily dependent on cotton farming, which often created long-lasting debt for its producers and, from the 1920s, suffered from recurrent boll weevil infestations. The Dust Bowl of the 1930s also encouraged families to move out of Boley. As economic opportunities dried up, some of Boley's black population migrated to Canada and Western Africa, but most ended up moving to larger cities in search of better job prospects. Before World War II, Boley's population had declined to about 700. With the Second Great Migration underway, by 1960 most of the population had left for other urban areas. So far the New Great Migration has not benefited Boley. However, Boley remains one of the state's few remaining historic African-American towns and its 2020 population of 1,091 is a 258% improvement compared to its population of 423 just four decades prior.

=== Timeline ===
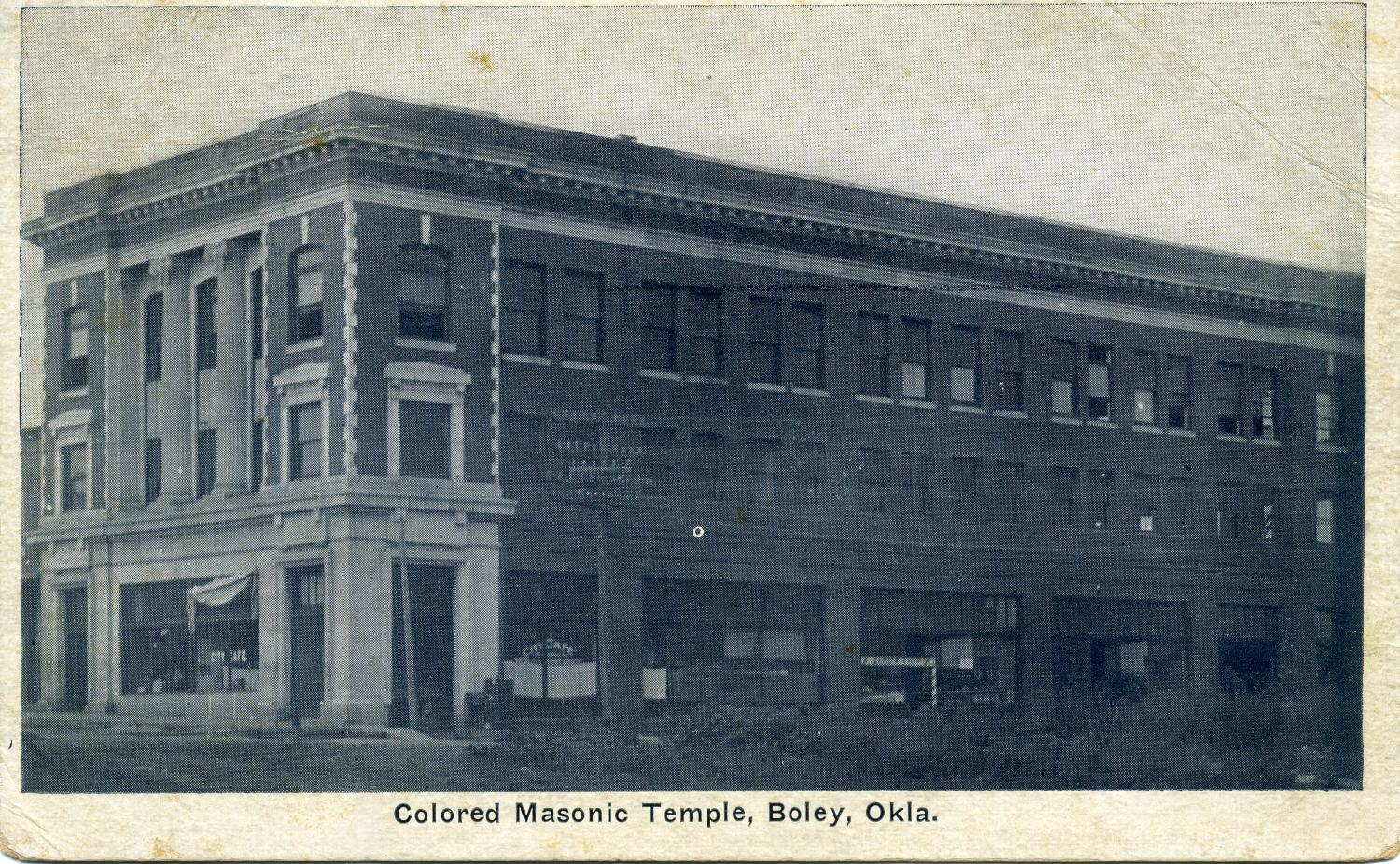
Three-story Masonic Lodge, constructed in 1912.

1897, by this time Oklahoma law required black children to be educated separately from white children

- 1903 Founding
- 1905 Booker T. Washington tours the newly incorporated Boley. Newspaper The Boley Progress starts publication.
- 1925, State Training School for Incorrigible Black Boys was located in Boley; it would become the John Lilley Correctional Center.
- 1926 The Boley Progress ceases publication.
- 1932 Armed citizens of Boley thwart a bank robbery attempt by members of Pretty Boy Floyd's gang.
- 1939 Fort Smith & Western Railroad and Boley go bankrupt.
- 1975 Boley Historic District given landmark status.

=== Inscription on Oklahoma Historical Society plaque honoring Boley ===
Boley, Oklahoma Est. August 1903 - Inc. May 1905 Boley, Creek Nation, I.T., Established as all black town on land of Creek Indian Freedwoman Abigail Barnett. Organized by T.M. Haynes first townsite manager. Named for J.B. Boley, white roadmaster, who convinced Fort Smith & Western Railroad that blacks could govern themselves. This concept soon boosted population to 4,200. Declared National Historic Landmark District by Congress May 15, 1975. Oklahoma Historical Society

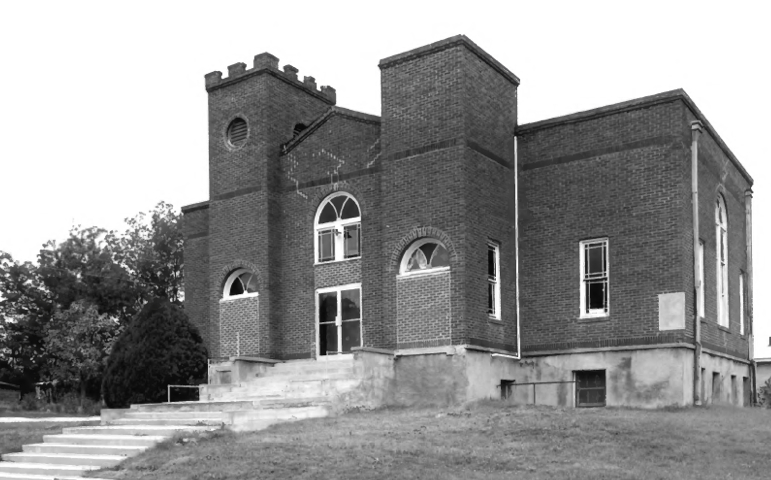
Antioch Baptist Church, originally built in 1903.

== Geography ==
Boley is located approximately 13 miles east of Prague and 11 miles west of Okemah on US Highway 62.

According to the United States Census Bureau, the town has a total area of 1.6 square miles (4.1 km^{2}), all land.

== Demographics ==
Historical population
Census	Pop.	Note	%±
1910	1,334		—
1920	1,154		−13.5%
1930	874		−24.3%
1940	942		7.8%
1950	646		−31.4%
1960	573		−11.3%
1970	514		−10.3%
1980	423		−17.7%
1990	908		114.7%
2000	1,126		24.0%
2010	1,184		5.2%
2020	1,091		−7.9%
U.S. Decennial Census

=== Racial and ethnic composition ===
Boley town, Oklahoma – Racial and ethnic composition Note: the US Census treats Hispanic/Latino as an ethnic category. This table excludes Latinos from the racial categories and assigns them to a separate category. Hispanics/Latinos may be of any race.
Race / Ethnicity (NH = Non-Hispanic)	Pop 2000	Pop 2010	Pop 2020	% 2000	% 2010	% 2020
White alone (NH)	393	518	581	34.90%	43.75%	53.25%
Black or African American alone (NH)	615	463	317	54.62%	39.10%	29.06%
Native American or Alaska Native alone (NH)	49	70	101	4.35%	5.91%	9.26%
Asian alone (NH)	1	1	9	0.09%	0.08%	0.82%
Native Hawaiian or Pacific Islander alone (NH)	0	0	0	0.00%	0.00%	0.00%
Other race alone (NH)	1	1	12	0.09%	0.08%	1.10%
Mixed race or Multiracial (NH)	32	60	12	2.84%	5.07%	1.10%
Hispanic or Latino (any race)	35	71	59	3.11%	6.00%	5.41%
Total	1,126	1,184	1,091	100.00%	100.00%	100.00%

=== 2020 census ===
As of the 2020 census, Boley had a population of 1,091. The median age was 43.7 years. 2.7% of residents were under the age of 18 and 9.8% of residents were 65 years of age or older. For every 100 females there were 891.8 males, and for every 100 females age 18 and over there were 1016.8 males age 18 and over.

0.0% of residents lived in urban areas, while 100.0% lived in rural areas.

There were 82 households in Boley, of which 22.0% had children under the age of 18 living in them. Of all households, 30.5% were married-couple households, 25.6% were households with a male householder and no spouse or partner present, and 39.0% were households with a female householder and no spouse or partner present. About 37.8% of all households were made up of individuals and 21.9% had someone living alone who was 65 years of age or older.

There were 119 housing units, of which 31.1% were vacant. The homeowner vacancy rate was 0.0% and the rental vacancy rate was 5.9%.

=== 2000 census ===
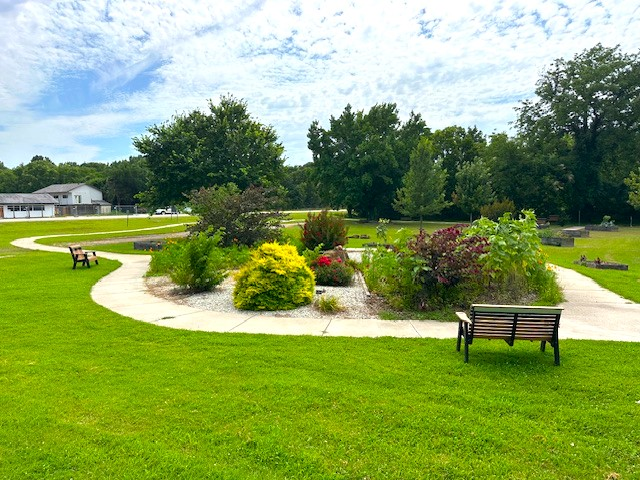
Park in Boley, July 2025

As of the census of 2000, there were 1,126 people, 136 households, and 79 families residing in the town. The population density was 684.6 inhabitants per square mile (264.3/km^{2}). There were 153 housing units at an average density of 93.0 per square mile (35.9/km^{2}). The racial makeup of the town was 35.61% White, 54.71% African American, 4.97% Native American, 0.09% Asian, 1.51% from other races, and 3.11% from two or more races. Hispanic or Latino of any race were 3.11% of the population.

There were 136 households, out of which 18.4% had children under the age of 18 living with them, 33.8% were married couples living together, 19.1% had a female householder with no husband present, and 41.9% were non-families. 36.0% of all households were made up of individuals, and 19.9% had someone living alone who was 65 years of age or older. The average household size was 2.35 and the average family size was 3.10.

In the town, the population was spread out, with 7.6% under the age of 18, 9.1% from 18 to 24, 51.0% from 25 to 44, 24.5% from 45 to 64, and 7.7% who were 65 years of age or older. The median age was 39 years. For every 100 females, there were 407.2 males. For every 100 females age 18 and over, there were 490.9 males.

The median income for a household in the town was $16,042, and the median income for a family was $27,500. Males had a median income of $21,875 versus $20,625 for females. The per capita income for the town was $9,304. About 25.0% of families and 40.2% of the population were below the poverty line, including 48.5% of those under age 18 and 20.3% of those age 65 or over.

== Arts and culture ==
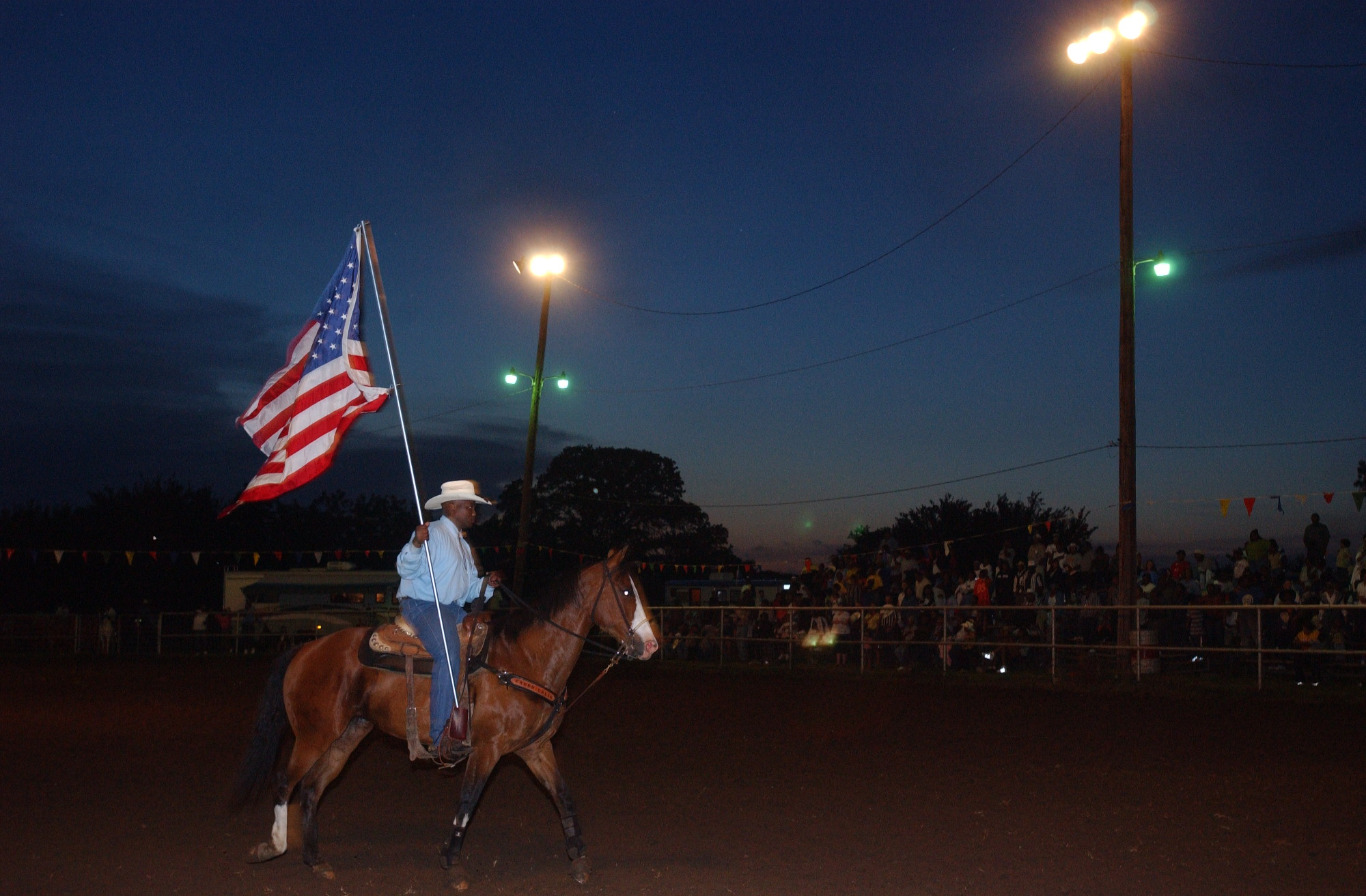
Boley 100th Birthday Rodeo & Bar-B-Q Festival. Boley is home to the oldest Black rodeo in the U.S.

=== Boley Rodeo ===
A tradition since 1903, the Boley Rodeo is the longest-running Black rodeo in the United States. The event, which typically takes place around Memorial Day weekend every year, embodies a celebration of Boley's rich history and culture. Karen Ekuban, a community organizer who has been instrumental in revitalizing and promoting the rodeo in recent years, describes the event as "a homecoming for our alumni, their children, and even their children's children. Every Memorial Day weekend, they know they're coming home."

=== Boley Historic District ===
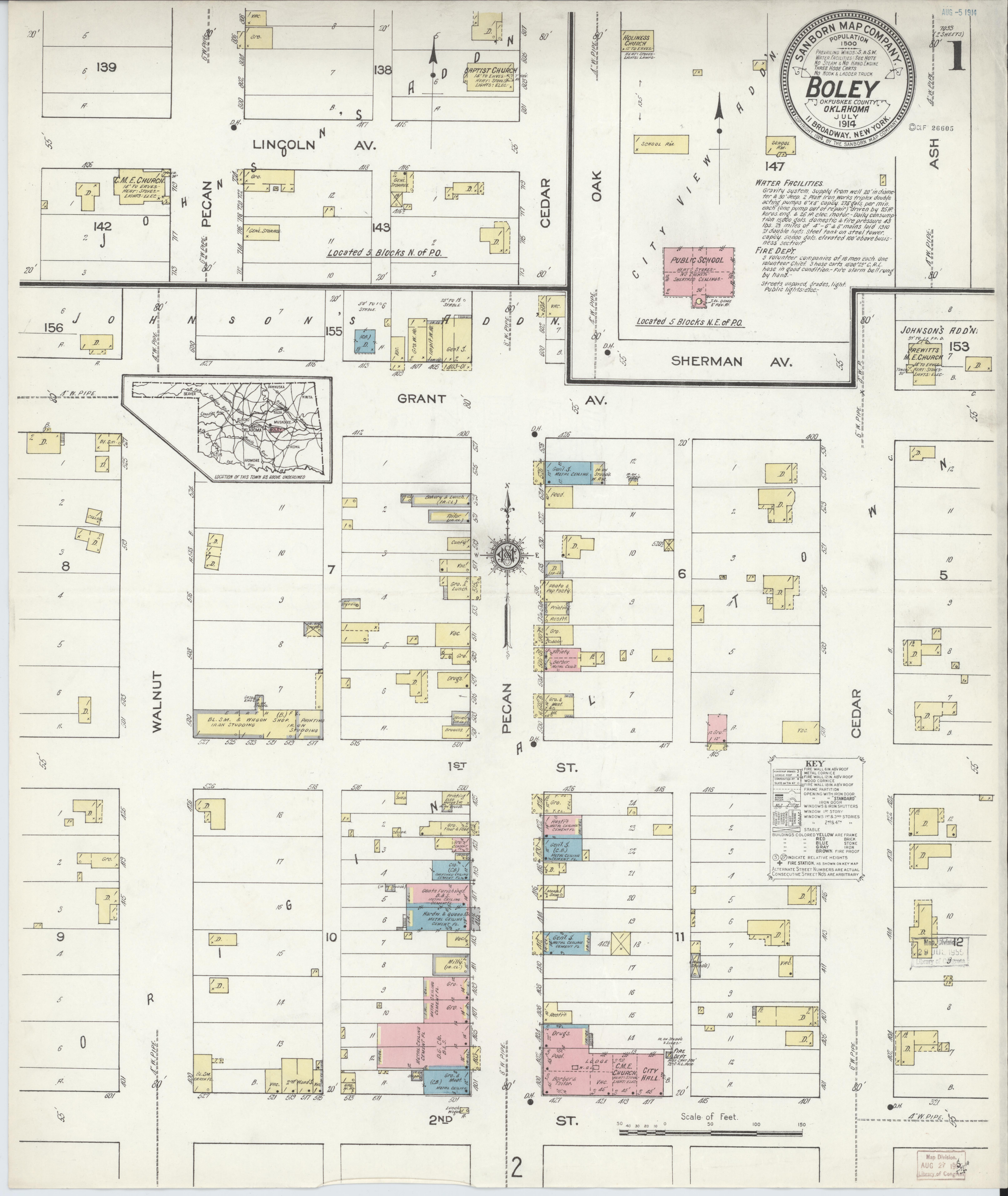
Fire Insurance Map, 1914

Part of Boley was declared as Boley Historic District and a National Historic Landmark in 1975. The District is roughly bounded by Seward Avenue, Walnut and Cedar Streets, and the southern city limits of Boley.

=== In film ===
Rodeo legend Bill Pickett, credited as the inventor or bulldogging, shot his film The Bull-Dogger, as well as his film The Crimson Skull, at Boley in 1922.

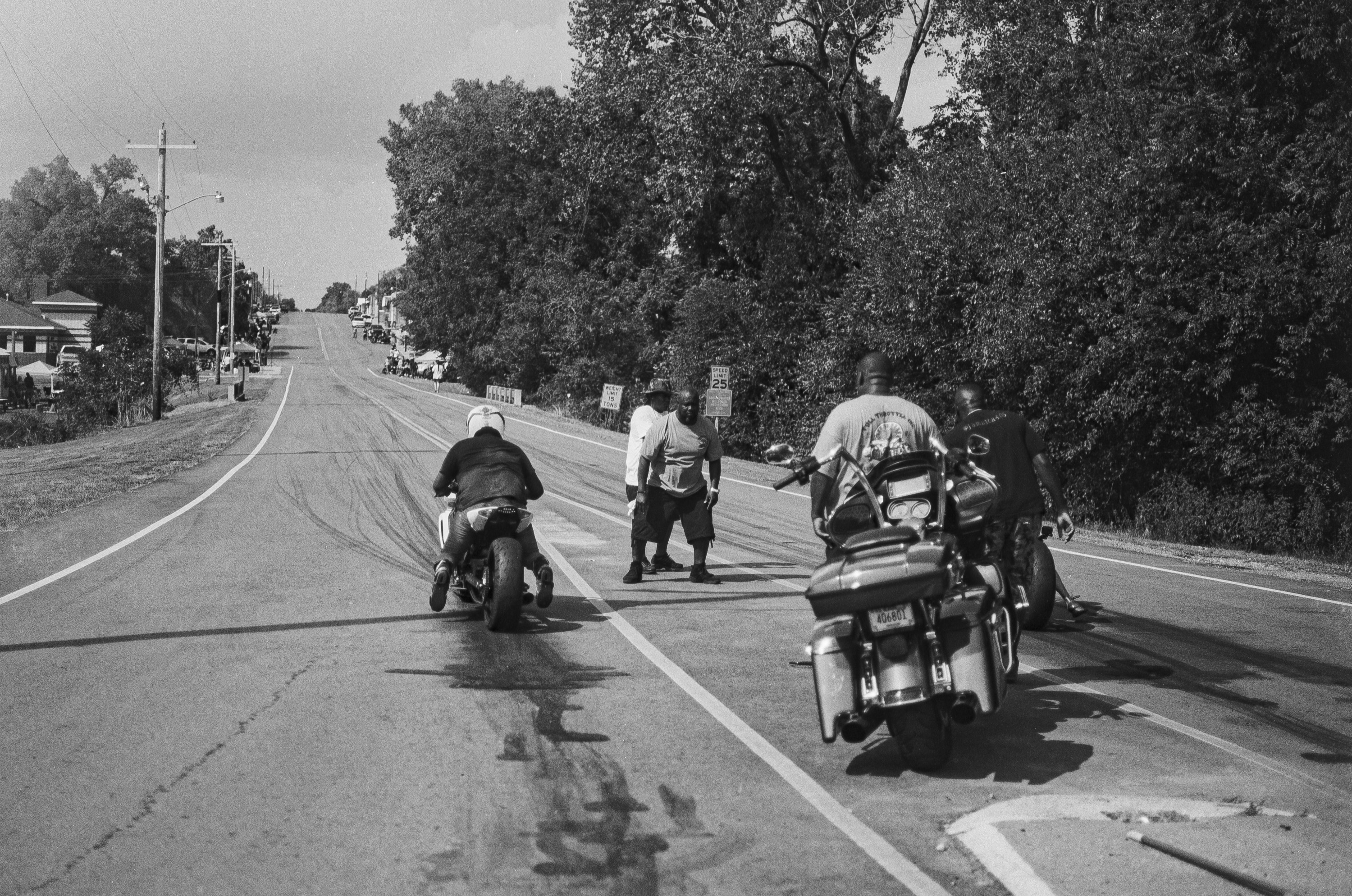
Boley City Council sponsors motorcycle street drag races in downtown Boley several times each year. Racers line up near the city park, and drag race 1/4 mile to the finish line in downtown Boley.

== Government ==
In the 2016 presidential election, the city gave over 78% of the vote to the Democratic Party candidate Hillary Clinton.

== Notable people ==
- Cardell Camper, major league baseball player
- Pumpsie Green - baseball player, first African American to play for the Boston Red Sox
- Zenobia Powell Perry - composer

== In popular culture ==
The Oklahoma Historical Society created the touring exhibition "Thirteen All-Black Towns of Oklahoma," highlighting Boley and 12 additional towns that have survived into the 21st century. Preview materials note: "When E. P. McCabe came to Oklahoma in the 1889 Land Run his vision was to create an All-Black state. Although that never materialized, McCabe and others succeeded in establishing All-Black towns. Nowhere else, neither in the Deep South nor the Far West, did so many African American men and women come together to create, occupy, and govern their own communities. Boley, Brooksville, Clearview, Grayson, Langston, Lima, Red Bird, Rentiesville, Taft, Tatums, Tullahassee, Summit, and Vernon are the towns highlighted in this exhibit."

== Quotations about Boley from Booker T. Washington ==
In a 2017 interview, historian Currie Ballard told The Oklahoman: “Boley was once the crown jewel of all the black towns in Oklahoma...Booker T. Washington came to Boley … twice and deemed it the finest black town in the world — and Booker T. Washington had literally been all around the world. Boley, its significance in commerce, its significance in education, parallels no other black town in the nation.”

Quotes about Boley attributed to Washington include:

"They have recovered something of the knack for trade that their fore-parents in Africa were famous for".

"Boley, Indian Territory, is the youngest, most enterprising, and in many ways the most interesting of the Negro towns in the US."

== See also ==
- Brooksville, Clearview, Grayson, Langston, Lima, Red Bird, Rentiesville, Summit, Taft, Tatums, Tullahassee, and Vernon, other "All-Black" settlements that were part of the Land Run of 1889.
