= Tatums, Oklahoma =

Town in Oklahoma, US

- Town
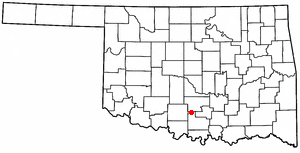
- Location of Tatums, Oklahoma
- Coordinates: 34°28′40″N 97°27′58″W
- Country: United States
- State: Oklahoma
- County: Carter

Government
  - Mayor: Derrick E.D. Smith Jr.

Area
  - Total: 2.01 sq mi (5.20 km^{2})
  - Land: 2.00 sq mi (5.19 km^{2})
  - Water: 0.0039 sq mi (0.01 km^{2})
- Elevation: 981 ft (299 m)

Population (2020)
  - Total: 111
  - Density: 55/sq mi (21.4/km^{2})
- Time zone: UTC-6 (Central (CST))
  - Summer (DST): UTC-5 (CDT)
- ZIP code: 73487
- Area code: 580
- FIPS code: 40-72500
- GNIS feature ID: 2413368
- Website: townoftatums.com

Tatums is a historic Freedmen's town in Carter County, Oklahoma, United States. As of the 2020 census, Tatums had a population of 111. It is part of the Ardmore, Oklahoma, Micropolitan Statistical Area.

== Geography ==
According to the United States Census Bureau, the town has a total area of 2.0 square miles (5.2 km^{2}), all land.

== History ==
According to the Encyclopedia of Oklahoma History and Culture, Tatums was founded in Indian Territory in 1895 by Lee and Mary Tatum, though Oklahoma Place Names states that the town was not incorporated until May 9, 1896, And a hotel was built in 1899, a blacksmith shop in 1900, a cotton gin and sawmill in 1910, and a motor garage in 1918. Oil wells were drilled in the area in the 1920s, bringing wealth to several of Tatumses farmers and landowners.

At the time of its founding, Tatums was located in Pickens County, Chickasaw Nation.

The town was one of more than fifty all-black towns founded in Oklahoma, and is one of thirteen still in existence. Lee Tatum was the first postmaster, ran a grocery store, and was a U.S. Marshal. Travelers who came through Tatums could stay at the home of Henry Taylor, who owned the largest home in town. Over the next few decades, other businesses were added to the town, including a church, school, hotel, blacksmith shop, a cotton gin, sawmill, and a motor garage. In the 1920s, oil wells were drilled around Tatums, and several residents richly profited from them.

A brick school funded by the Rosenwald Fund was completed in 1926. In 1927, Norman Studios filmed a silent movie, Black Gold, in Tatums. Marshal L. B. Tatums played a role in the film. No copy of the film is known to exist, but the script and camera are held by the Autry National Center in California.

The Great Depression greatly damaged Tatums' economy, so many residents migrated to urban areas. Amid the Depression, the Works Progress Administration built a new brick school in 1936.

The Bethel Missionary Baptist Church, completed in 1919, is an historic Baptist church in Tatums, and is included on the NRHP listings for Carter County.

== Demographics ==
Historical population
Census	Pop.	Note	%±
1970	133		—
1980	281		111.3%
1990	176		−37.4%
2000	198		12.5%
2010	151		−23.7%
2020	111		−26.5%
U.S. Decennial Census

=== Racial and ethnic composition ===
Tatums town, Oklahoma – Racial and ethnic composition Note: the US Census treats Hispanic/Latino as an ethnic category. This table excludes Latinos from the racial categories and assigns them to a separate category. Hispanics/Latinos may be of any race.
Race / Ethnicity (NH = Non-Hispanic)	Pop 2000	Pop 2010	Pop 2020	% 2000	% 2010	% 2020
White alone (NH)	13	7	10	7.56%	4.64%	9.01%
Black or African American alone (NH)	135	118	100	78.49%	78.15%	90.09%
Native American or Alaska Native alone (NH)	8	10	0	4.65%	6.62%	0.00%
Asian alone (NH)	0	0	0	0.00%	0.00%	0.00%
Native Hawaiian or Pacific Islander alone (NH)	0	0	0	0.00%	0.00%	0.00%
Other race alone (NH)	0	0	0	0.00%	0.00%	0.00%
Mixed race or Multiracial (NH)	14	11	0	8.14%	7.28%	0.00%
Hispanic or Latino (any race)	2	5	1	1.16%	3.31%	0.90%
Total	172	151	111	100.00%	100.00%	100.00%

=== 2020 census ===
As of the 2020 census, Tatums had a population of 111. The median age was 52.5 years. 18.9% of residents were under the age of 18 and 30.6% of residents were 65 years of age or older. For every 100 females there were 82.0 males, and for every 100 females age 18 and over there were 83.7 males age 18 and over.

0.0% of residents lived in urban areas, while 100.0% lived in rural areas.

There were 51 households in Tatums, of which 25.5% had children under the age of 18 living in them. Of all households, 27.5% were married-couple households, 19.6% were households with a male householder and no spouse or partner present, and 49.0% were households with a female householder and no spouse or partner present. About 33.3% of all households were made up of individuals and 21.5% had someone living alone who was 65 years of age or older.

There were 67 housing units, of which 23.9% were vacant. The homeowner vacancy rate was 2.4% and the rental vacancy rate was 8.3%.

=== 2010 census ===
As of the 2010 United States census, there were 151 people, 68 households, and 45 families residing in the town. The racial makeup of the town was 79.5% African American, 4.6% White, 8.6% Native American, and 7.3% from two or more races. Hispanic or Latino of any race were 3.3% of the population.

There were 68 households, out of which 19.1% had children under the age of 18 living with them, 27.9% were married couples living together, 26.5% had a female householder with no husband present, and 33.8% were non-families. 33.8% of all households were made up of individuals, and 32.4% had someone living alone who was 65 years of age or older. The average household size was 2.22 and the average family size was 2.64.

The population was spread out, with 18.5% under the age of 18, 6.0% from 18 to 24, 20.5% from 25 to 44, 37.7% from 45 to 64, and 17.2% who were 65 years of age or older. The median age was 48.8 years. For every 100 females, there were 115.7 males. For every 100 females age 18 and over, there were 95.2 males.

According to the 2013 American Community Survey, The median income for a household in the town was $21,083, and the median income for a family was $21,500. The per capita income for the town was $10,509. About 25.0% of families and 37.8% of the population were below the poverty line, including 77.8% of those under the age of 18 and 35.7% of those 65 or over.

== See also ==
- Boley, Brooksville, Clearview, Grayson, Langston, Lima, Redbird, Rentiesville, Summit, Taft, Tullahassee, and Vernon, other "All-Black" settlements that were part of the Land Run of 1889.
