= Clearview, Oklahoma =

- Town
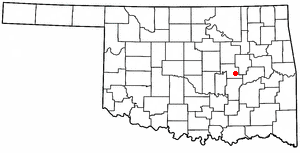
- Location of Clearview, Oklahoma
- Coordinates: 35°23′55″N 96°11′15″W
- Country: United States
- State: Oklahoma
- County: Okfuskee

Area
  - Total: 0.38 sq mi (0.98 km^{2})
  - Land: 0.38 sq mi (0.98 km^{2})
  - Water: 0 sq mi (0.00 km^{2})
- Elevation: 791 ft (241 m)

Population (2020)
  - Total: 41
  - Density: 108.7/sq mi (41.96/km^{2})
- Time zone: UTC-6 (Central (CST))
  - Summer (DST): UTC-5 (CDT)
- ZIP code: 74880
- Area code: 405
- FIPS code: 40-15050
- GNIS feature ID: 2413212

Clearview is a town in Okfuskee County, Oklahoma, United States. The population was 41 at the 2020 Census. It was historically an all-black freedmen's town and was platted by the Lincoln Townsite Company and designated as Lincoln.

== Geography ==
According to the United States Census Bureau, the town has a total area of 0.2 square miles (0.52 km^{2}), all land.

== Demographics ==
Historical population
Census	Pop.	Note	%±
1990	47		—
2000	56		19.1%
2010	48		−14.3%
2020	41		−14.6%
U.S. Decennial Census

=== Racial and ethnic composition ===
Clearview town, Oklahoma – Racial and ethnic composition Note: the US Census treats Hispanic/Latino as an ethnic category. This table excludes Latinos from the racial categories and assigns them to a separate category. Hispanics/Latinos may be of any race.
Race / Ethnicity (NH = Non-Hispanic)	Pop 2000	Pop 2010	Pop 2020	% 2000	% 2010	% 2020
White alone (NH)	4	7	5	7.14%	14.58%	12.20%
Black or African American alone (NH)	42	36	27	75.00%	75.00%	65.85%
Native American or Alaska Native alone (NH)	7	3	0	12.50%	6.25%	0.00%
Asian alone (NH)	0	0	0	0.00%	0.00%	0.00%
Native Hawaiian or Pacific Islander alone (NH)	0	0	0	0.00%	0.00%	0.00%
Other race alone (NH)	0	0	1	0.00%	0.00%	2.44%
Mixed race or Multiracial (NH)	3	2	5	5.36%	4.17%	12.20%
Hispanic or Latino (any race)	0	0	3	0.00%	0.00%	7.32%
Total	56	48	41	100.00%	100.00%	100.00%

=== 2020 census ===
As of the 2020 census, Clearview had a population of 41. The median age was 55.5 years. 9.8% of residents were under the age of 18 and 46.3% of residents were 65 years of age or older. For every 100 females there were 173.3 males, and for every 100 females age 18 and over there were 146.7 males age 18 and over.

0.0% of residents lived in urban areas, while 100.0% lived in rural areas.

There were 24 households in Clearview, of which 33.3% had children under the age of 18 living in them. Of all households, 37.5% were married-couple households, 37.5% were households with a male householder and no spouse or partner present, and 20.8% were households with a female householder and no spouse or partner present. About 37.5% of all households were made up of individuals and 25.0% had someone living alone who was 65 years of age or older.

There were 24 housing units, of which 0.0% were vacant. The homeowner vacancy rate was 0.0% and the rental vacancy rate was 0.0%.

=== 2000 census ===
As of the census of 2000, there were 56 people, 24 households, and 13 families residing in the town. The population density was 320.7 inhabitants per square mile (123.8/km^{2}). There were 34 housing units at an average density of 194.7 per square mile (75.2/km^{2}). The racial makeup of the town was 7.14% White, 75.00% African American, 12.50% Native American, and 5.36% from two or more races.

There were 24 households, out of which 25.0% had children under the age of 18 living with them, 29.2% were married couples living together, 20.8% had a female householder with no husband present, and 45.8% were non-families. 45.8% of all households were made up of individuals, and 41.7% had someone living alone who was 65 years of age or older. The average household size was 2.33 and the average family size was 3.31.

In the town, the population was spread out, with 26.8% under the age of 18, 5.4% from 18 to 24, 30.4% from 25 to 44, 16.1% from 45 to 64, and 21.4% who were 65 years of age or older. The median age was 38 years. For every 100 females, there were 75.0 males. For every 100 females age 18 and over, there were 78.3 males.

The median income for a household in the town was $16,250, and the median income for a family was $22,500. Males had a median income of $62,500 versus $16,250 for females. The per capita income for the town was $11,607. There were 20.0% of families and 40.7% of the population living below the poverty line, including 52.9% under eighteen and 58.3% over 64.

== History ==
Clearview, Oklahoma, was founded in 1903 prior to statehood by J.A. Roper, Lemuel Jackson, and John Grayson, who established the Lincoln Townsite Company to attract settlers. Located along the Fort Smith and Western Railroad, Clearview was part of the Black Town Movement, which provided African Americans opportunities for landownership, self-governance, and economic independence.

In 1903, the Abe Lincoln Trading Company opened, serving as the town's primary trading post and commercial center. It provided local farmers with farming supplies, household goods, and building materials.

== See also ==
- Boley, Brooksville, Grayson, Langston, Lima, Redbird, Rentiesville, Summit, Taft, Tatums, Tullahassee, and Vernon, other "All-Black" settlements that were part of the Land Run of 1889.
