= George W. McLaurin =

African American professor (1894–1968)

- Born: September 16, 1894; Mississippi, United States
- Died: September 4, 1968 (aged 73); Los Angeles County, California
- Burial place: Trice Hill Cemetery, Oklahoma City, Oklahoma
- Occupation: Professor
- Known for: First African American to attend the University of Oklahoma, plaintiff in McLaurin v. Oklahoma State Regents
- Spouse(s): Peninah, died 1966
- Children: 3, including Dunbar Simms McLaurin

Academic background
- Education: B.A., Langston University; M.A., University of Kansas

George W. McLaurin (September 16, 1894 – September 4, 1968) was an American professor, the first African American to attend the University of Oklahoma. He was the successful plaintiff in an important civil rights case against the university, McLaurin v. Oklahoma State Regents (1950).

== Biography ==
McLaurin held a master's degree from the University of Kansas and was a retired professor living in Oklahoma City. Before retirement, he taught at a predominantly black college, Langston University, where he had earned his bachelor's degree.

=== McLaurin v. Oklahoma State Regents ===
He applied and was accepted into the University of Oklahoma in 1948, as a result of the United States Supreme Court decision in McLaurin v. Oklahoma State Regents, concerning his application, which enabled African Americans to be admitted to graduate education at the University of Oklahoma on a segregated basis. In the case, McLaurin was supported by Thurgood Marshall, Amos T. Hall, Roscoe Dunjee, and five other African American students. The university was required by law to allow McLaurin into the school, but he was entirely segregated from the other students. Later when other African-American students were admitted into the school, they went through similar conditions such as different classrooms, libraries, cafeterias, and restrooms.

On September 29, 1948, a federal court ruled that the University of Oklahoma's refusal to admit McLaurin was unconstitutional. To comply with segregation laws, the president of the university, George Lynn Cross, arranged for McLaurin's classes to be held in classrooms with an anteroom: this way, McLaurin could sit away from the white students while still attending all his classes. At first, he was forced to sit with his desk and chair outside the classroom in the hallway next to the door so he could listen to the lectures while maintaining separation from the white students. Other special accommodations that were created to continue segregation include special seating areas at the cafeteria and sporting events, and separate restroom facilities. In retaliation of these conditions, McLaurin filed a suit stating that these conditions deprived him of equality. The District Court was not in agreement with his argument and denied his motion for the reason that racial segregation is a "deeply rooted social policy of the State of Oklahoma." Afterwards, McLaurin brought his case up again but this time he appealed to the U.S. Supreme Court. This would begin the timeline of the McLaurin v. Oklahoma State Regents suit.

In McLaurin v. Oklahoma State Regents, McLaurin argued that the Fourteenth Amendment was being violated by how they were being treated. It was not until 1950 that the Supreme Court ruled that the treatment must be equal between White and African American students. Mclaurin v Oklahoma State Regents was an important case in history because it was one of the first cases that attempted to combat the "separate but equal" provision in the Plessy v Ferguson case. Mclaurin v Oklahoma showed how the "separate but equal" provision can still be manipulated in a way that discriminates against individuals based on race. This case played an influential role in history because its ruling led the way to the eventual overturning of Plessy v Ferguson. The Mclaurin case showed the inequality in the separate but equal provision, the accommodations made for Mclaurin required that he sit separate from the other students, in an alcove labeled "reserved of colored", he sat alone in the cafeteria and he also had his own desk in the library which was behind a stack of newspapers so he would not be seen by the white students. All of these discriminatory practices happened under the umbrella of the separate but equal provision." In 1950 a unanimous Supreme Court ruled that McLaurin had not received equal treatment as required by the Constitution. Writing for the Court, Chief Justice Frederick M. Vinson wrote that McLaurin was "handicapped in his pursuit of effective graduate instruction. Such restrictions impair and inhibit his ability to study, to engage in discussion and exchange views with other students, and in general to learn his professions."

=== Legacy ===
In 2014, an annual conference was named after George W. McLaurin on the OU campus called The George McLaurin Male Leadership Conference. The conference is mainly intended for the recruitment of first-generation college students, and particularly those within minority groups. A campus lounge with a memorial display in the university community center is named in honor of McLaurin and Sylvia A. Lewis, another student who challenged segregation at OU.
