= Rentiesville, Oklahoma =

- Town
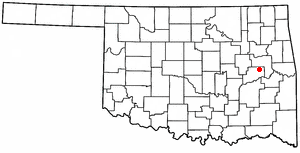
- Location in Oklahoma
- Coordinates: 35°32′01″N 95°29′05″W
- Country: United States
- State: Oklahoma
- County: McIntosh

Area
  - Total: 1.67 sq mi (4.32 km^{2})
  - Land: 1.67 sq mi (4.32 km^{2})
  - Water: 0 sq mi (0.00 km^{2})
- Elevation: 594 ft (181 m)

Population (2020)
  - Total: 103
  - Density: 61.7/sq mi (23.84/km^{2})
- Time zone: UTC-6 (Central (CST))
  - Summer (DST): UTC-5 (CDT)
- ZIP Codes: 74459 (Rentiesville); 74426 (Checotah)
- Area codes: 539/918
- FIPS code: 40-62950
- GNIS feature ID: 2412543
- Website: townofrentiesvilleok.com

Rentiesville is a town in McIntosh County, Oklahoma, United States. It was founded in 1903 and named for William Rentie, a local landowner. It was one of 50 all-black towns in Oklahoma and is one of 13 that still survive. The population was 103 at the 2020 census, down from 128 in 2010.

== History ==
The Civil War Battle of Honey Springs was fought about a half mile east of present-day Rentiesville and south of Oktaha, near the county line; the Honey Springs Battlefield, now within the Rentiesville town limits, is listed on the National Register of Historic Places. Honey Springs was Oklahoma's largest Civil War engagement.

Rentiesville was founded as an all-black town in 1903 on land owned by William Rentie and Phoebe McIntosh. The post office opened May 11, 1904, and the town became a flag stop on the Missouri–Kansas–Texas Railroad. William Rentie was the town's only lawman until 1908, when he was shot and killed by a man he had arrested for being drunk and disorderly.

== Geography ==
Rentiesville is located in northeastern McIntosh County, 5 miles (8 km) north-northeast of Checotah and a short distance east of U.S. Route 69.

The Honey Springs Battlefield is less than a mile northeast of the center of town, off 11th Street.

According to the U.S. Census Bureau, the town has a total area of 1.7 square miles (4.4 km^{2}), all land. Elk Creek passes just west of the town limits, flowing north toward Dirty Creek, an east-flowing tributary of the Arkansas River.

== Demographics ==
Historical population
Census	Pop.	Note	%±
1910	411		—
1920	255		−38.0%
1930	154		−39.6%
1940	180		16.9%
1950	156		−13.3%
1960	122		−21.8%
1970	96		−21.3%
1980	78		−18.7%
1990	66		−15.4%
2000	102		54.5%
2010	128		25.5%
2020	103		−19.5%
U.S. Decennial Census

=== Racial and ethnic composition ===
Rentiesville town, Oklahoma – Racial and ethnic composition Note: the US Census treats Hispanic/Latino as an ethnic category. This table excludes Latinos from the racial categories and assigns them to a separate category. Hispanics/Latinos may be of any race.
Race / Ethnicity (NH = Non-Hispanic)	Pop 2000	Pop 2010	Pop 2020	% 2000	% 2010	% 2020
White alone (NH)	28	40	17	27.45%	31.25%	16.50%
Black or African American alone (NH)	66	64	52	64.71%	50.00%	50.49%
Native American or Alaska Native alone (NH)	5	8	9	4.90%	6.25%	8.74%
Asian alone (NH)	0	0	0	0.00%	0.00%	0.00%
Native Hawaiian or Pacific Islander alone (NH)	0	0	0	0.00%	0.00%	0.00%
Other race alone (NH)	0	0	1	0.00%	0.00%	0.97%
Mixed race or Multiracial (NH)	3	12	13	2.94%	9.38%	12.62%
Hispanic or Latino (any race)	0	4	11	0.00%	3.13%	10.68%
Total	102	128	103	100.00%	100.00%	100.00%

=== 2020 census ===
As of the 2020 census, Rentiesville had a population of 103. The median age was 50.5 years. 17.5% of residents were under the age of 18 and 22.3% of residents were 65 years of age or older. For every 100 females there were 106.0 males, and for every 100 females age 18 and over there were 112.5 males age 18 and over.

0.0% of residents lived in urban areas, while 100.0% lived in rural areas.

There were 47 households in Rentiesville, of which 34.0% had children under the age of 18 living in them. Of all households, 36.2% were married-couple households, 23.4% were households with a male householder and no spouse or partner present, and 25.5% were households with a female householder and no spouse or partner present. About 21.3% of all households were made up of individuals and 8.5% had someone living alone who was 65 years of age or older.

There were 56 housing units, of which 16.1% were vacant. The homeowner vacancy rate was 0.0% and the rental vacancy rate was 0.0%.

=== 2000 census ===
As of the census of 2000, there were 102 people, 42 households, and 27 families residing in the town. The population density was 59.2 inhabitants per square mile (22.9/km^{2}). There were 51 housing units at an average density of 29.6 per square mile (11.4/km^{2}). The racial makeup of the town was 64.71% African American, 27.45% White, 4.90% Native American, and 2.94% from two or more races.

There were 42 households, out of which 21.4% had children under the age of 18 living with them, 42.9% were married couples living together, 19.0% had a female householder with no husband present, and 35.7% were non-families. 31.0% of all households were made up of individuals, and 14.3% had someone living alone who was 65 years of age or older. The average household size was 2.43 and the average family size was 3.00.

In the town, the population was spread out, with 25.5% under the age of 18, 5.9% from 18 to 24, 23.5% from 25 to 44, 24.5% from 45 to 64, and 20.6% who were 65 years of age or older. The median age was 42 years. For every 100 females, there were 92.5 males. For every 100 females age 18 and over, there were 85.4 males.

The median income for a household in the town was $23,750, and the median income for a family was $31,250. Males had a median income of $6,250 versus $36,250 for females. The per capita income for the town was $21,862. There were 26.9% of families and 24.4% of the population living below the poverty line, including 24.0% of under eighteens and 23.1% of those over 64.

== Notable people ==
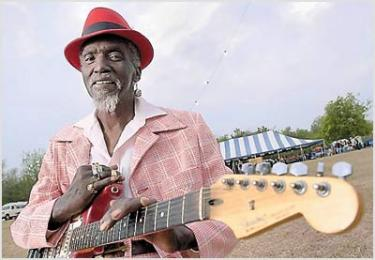
D.C. Minner at his Dusk 'til Dawn Blues Festival.

- John Hope Franklin (1915–2009), professor emeritus at Duke University, historian, and author of numerous books, including From Slavery to Freedom, was born in Rentiesville. His father, B. C. Franklin, served as the second postmaster of the town.
- D.C. Minner (1935–2008), blues singer, was born in Rentiesville. He owned the "Down Home Blues Club" in Rentiesville, where he and his wife Selby Minner founded the long-running annual Dusk Til Dawn Blues Festival.

== See also ==
- Boley, Brooksville, Clearview, Grayson, Langston, Lima, Redbird, Summit, Taft, Tatums, Tullahassee, and Vernon, other "All-Black" settlements that were part of the Land Run of 1889.
