= Freedom National Bank =

American bank in Harlem, New York (1964–90)

Freedom National Bank was an African-American-owned bank in Harlem (New York City) founded in 1964 and shut down in 1990. Freedom National served Harlem's Black community and was one of the largest Black-owned banks in the U.S. Its main office was at 275 West 125th Street.

== History ==
Freedom National Bank was founded in 1964 by investors including Jackie Robinson and Dunbar Simms McLaurin. The New York Times referred to it as "biracial" when it was founded in 1964.

A 1966 Harvard Crimson article was critical of the bank. Freedom National competed with another Black-owned and Black-focused bank, the older Carver Federal Savings and Loan Association (now Carver Bancorp).

Freedom National failed in 1990 during a recession as it faced loan defaults and internal division. When it was shut down, Freedom National had $101.9 million in assets, two branches in Brooklyn, 22,000 depositors, and 97 employees. The bank had also struggled in the mid-1970s but was able to return to profitability.

In 1990, the Federal Deposit Insurance Corporation (FDIC) bailed out depositors up to the U.S. government's $100,000 guarantee for deposits. The decision was seen as a serious "blunder", in contrast to FDIC's treatment of the vast majority of "800 bank failures in the last four years". In those cases, FDIC did not just pay off insured accounts, but instead facilitated new owners to take over failed banks so that the customers received all their money back.
