= Muskogee County, Oklahoma =

County in Oklahoma, United States

- County
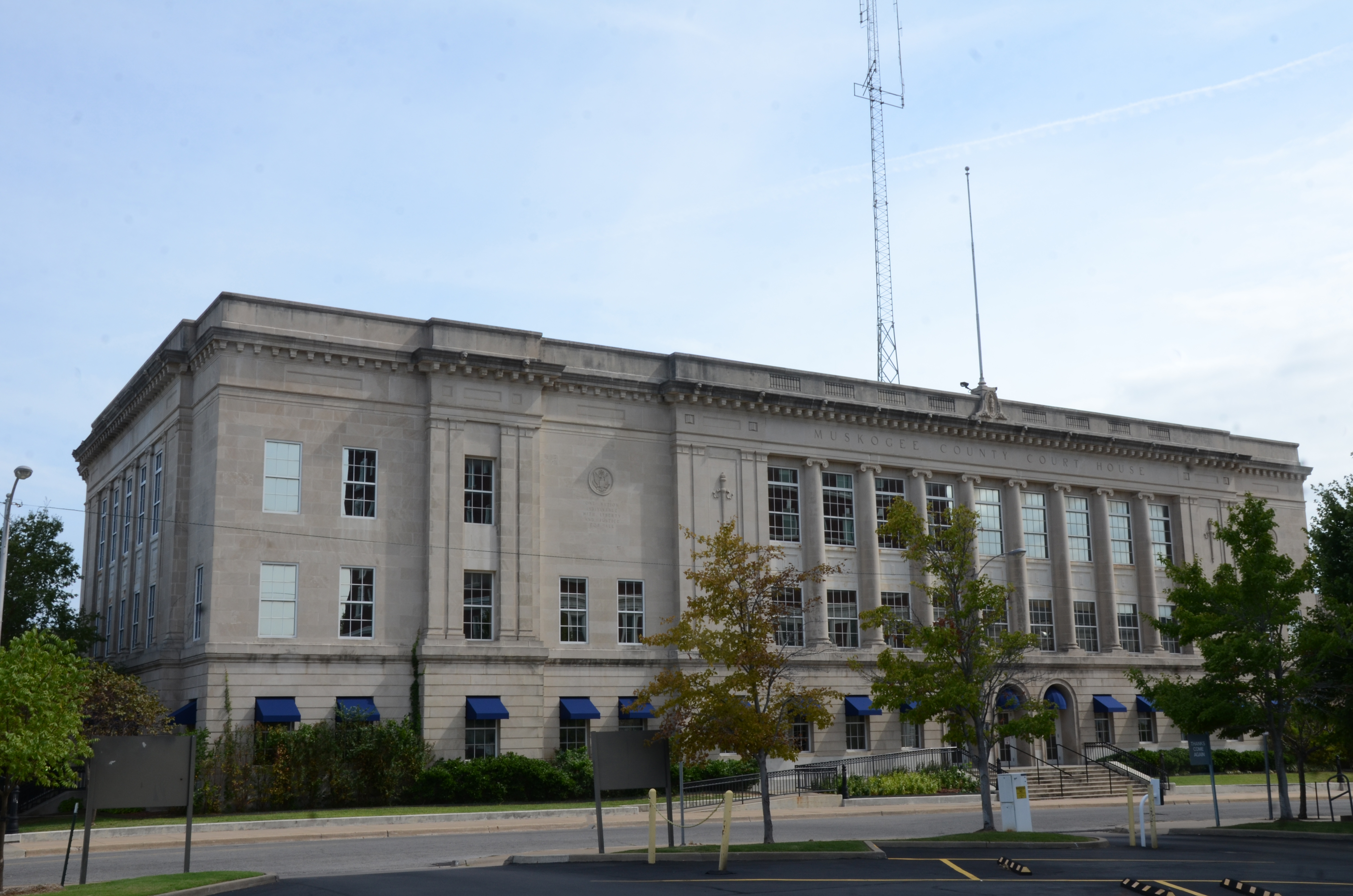
- Muskogee County Courthouse in September 2015

- Location within the U.S. state of Oklahoma
- Coordinates: 35°37′N 95°23′W
- Country: United States
- State: Oklahoma
- Founded: 1907
- Named for: Muscogee Nation
- Seat: Muskogee
- Largest city: Muskogee

Area
  - Total: 840 sq mi (2,200 km^{2})
  - Land: 810 sq mi (2,100 km^{2})
  - Water: 29 sq mi (75 km^{2}) 3.5%

Population (2020)
  - Total: 66,339
  - Estimate (2025): 66,708 ▲
  - Density: 82/sq mi (32/km^{2})
- Congressional district: 2nd
- Website: muskogee.okcounties.org

Muskogee County is a county located in the U.S. state of Oklahoma. As of the 2020 census, the population was 66,339. The county seat is Muskogee. The county and city were named for the Muscogee (Creek) Nation. The official spelling of the name was changed to Muskogee by the post office in 1900. Muskogee County is part of the Muskogee, OK micropolitan statistical area, which is included in the Tulsa-Muskogee-Bartlesville combined statistical area.

== History ==
According to archaeological studies, prehistoric people lived in this area as long ago as the Paleo-Indian period (before 6,000 B. C.). However, archaeologists have made more extensive studies of those people known as the Mound Builders who lived here during the Caddoan Stage (A.D. 300 – 1200).

One of the first Europeans to come to this area was Jean Baptiste Bénard de la Harpe. He was a French explorer and trader who discovered a Wichita village in 1719. By the end of the 18th century the Wichita had been driven away by the more warlike Osage, who used this as their hunting ground.

Auguste Pierre Chouteau and other fur traders established a settlement at the Three Forks. Early in the 19th century, Cherokee and Choctaw hunting parties made incursions that caused frequent conflict with the Osage. In 1824, the U.S. Army established Fort Gibson on the Grand River to dampen the conflict. The town of Fort Gibson that grew up just outside the fort claims to be the oldest town in Oklahoma.

At the start of the U. S. Civil War, Confederate troops of the Cherokee and Creek Home Guards built Fort Davis, across the Arkansas River from Fort Gibson. Federal troops attacked and destroyed Fort Davis in 1862, driving the Confederates from this area, although a few skirmishes occurred later in the war at Bayou Menard Skirmish (1862), several at Webbers Falls (1862), and the Creek Agency Skirmish (1863).

The county was formed at statehood with land from the Muskogee District of the Creek Nation and the Canadian and Illinois Districts of the Cherokee Nation. A post office named Muscogee had been established January 17, 1872. The official spelling of the name was changed to Muskogee on July 19, 1900.

After the Civil War, the Five Civilized Tribes, which included the Creeks, agreed to new treaties with the federal government. Among other provisions, they ceded their western lands back to the government and allowed rights of way to railroads. The Missouri, Kansas and Texas Railway (also called MKT or Katy) built a line into Indian Territory, near the Three Forks. Although railroad officials intended to build a depot at the site of Fort Davis, the terrain proved unsuitable, so they relocated the depot, which they named Muscogee, farther south. They also began the town of Oktaha 11 miles (18 km) farther south, in the same year.

Other railroads followed, such as the Kansas and Arkansas Valley Railway (1888, later the Missouri Pacific Railway), the Midland Valley Railroad (1904–05), the Ozark and Cherokee Central Railway (1901–03, sold to the St. Louis and San Francisco Railway, Frisco), the Shawnee, Oklahoma and Missouri Coal and Railway (1902–03, sold to the Frisco), the Muskogee Union Railway (1903–04, sold to the Missouri, Oklahoma and Gulf Railway [MOG]), and the MOG (1903–05, which became the Texas and Pacific Railroad).

In 1874, the federal government consolidated all of the Five Civilized Tribes agencies into one Union Agency, located just west of Muscogee. In 1889, a federal district court was created in Muscogee. In 1894, the Dawes Commission also established its headquarters there.

== Geography ==
According to the U.S. Census Bureau, the county has a total area of 840 square miles (2,200 km^{2}), of which 810 square miles (2,100 km^{2}) is land and 29 square miles (75 km^{2}) (3.5%) is water.

The western part of the county is prairie grassland, while the eastern part rises into the Cookson Hills, on the western edge of the Ozark Mountains. The Arkansas, Verdigris and Grand rivers all converge in the county, causing that area to be called "Three Forks." Webbers Falls Lake on the Arkansas River covers part of the county.

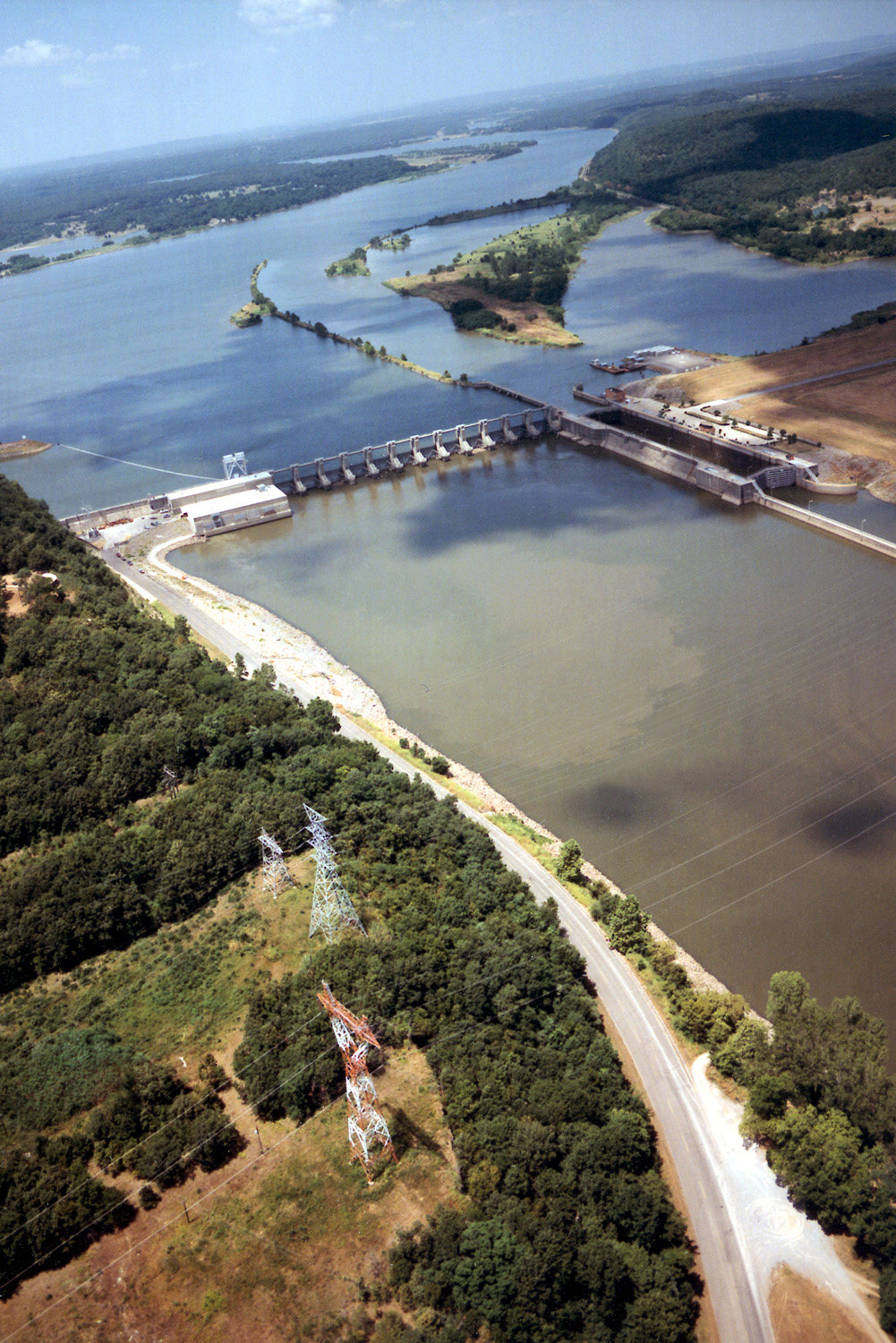
The Arkansas River in Muskogee County. The Webbers Falls Lock and Dam on the river are part of the navigation system on the river, maintained by the U.S. Army Corps of Engineers.

=== Major highways ===
- Interstate 40
- U.S. Highway 62
- U.S. Highway 64
- U.S. Highway 69
- U.S. Highway 266
- State Highway 2
- State Highway 10
  - State Highway 10A
- State Highway 16
- State Highway 71
- State Highway 72
- State Highway 80
- State Highway 100
- State Highway 104
- State Highway 162
- State Highway 165
- Muskogee Turnpike

=== Adjacent counties ===
- Wagoner County (north)
- Cherokee County (northeast)
- Sequoyah County (east)
- Haskell County (southeast)
- McIntosh County (southwest)
- Okmulgee County (west)

=== National protected area ===
- Sequoyah National Wildlife Refuge (part)

== Government ==
The county seat of the county is Muskogee. All elected officials and county services are headquartered there.

Office	Current Officer	Since	Party
County Commissioner - District 1	Ken Doke	2015	Republican
County Commissioner - District 2	Keith Hyslop	2021	Republican
County Commissioner - District 3	Kenny Payne	2015	Republican
County Sheriff	Andy Simmons	2019	Republican
County Clerk	Polly Irving	2021	Republican
County Treasurer	Shelly Sumpter	2021	Republican
County Assessor	Ron Dean	2019	Republican
District Attorney	Larry Edwards	2021	Republican
District Court Clerk	Robyn Boswell	2021	Republican

== Demographics ==
Historical population
Census	Pop.	Note	%±
1910	52,743		—
1920	61,710		17.0%
1930	66,424		7.6%
1940	65,914		−0.8%
1950	65,573		−0.5%
1960	61,866		−5.7%
1970	59,542		−3.8%
1980	66,939		12.4%
1990	68,078		1.7%
2000	69,451		2.0%
2010	70,990		2.2%
2020	66,339		−6.6%
2025 (est.)	66,708	▲	0.6%
U.S. Decennial Census; 1790-1960 1900-1990; 1990-2000 2010

=== 2020 census ===
As of the 2020 census, the county had a population of 66,339. Of the residents, 23.0% were under the age of 18 and 18.8% were 65 years of age or older; the median age was 40.0 years. For every 100 females there were 94.7 males, and for every 100 females age 18 and over there were 92.3 males.

The racial makeup of the county was 54.0% White, 10.0% Black or African American, 18.2% American Indian and Alaska Native, 0.8% Asian, 3.2% from some other race, and 13.8% from two or more races. Hispanic or Latino residents of any race comprised 6.8% of the population.

There were 25,525 households in the county, of which 30.4% had children under the age of 18 living with them and 29.7% had a female householder with no spouse or partner present. About 29.9% of all households were made up of individuals and 14.0% had someone living alone who was 65 years of age or older.

There were 29,278 housing units, of which 12.8% were vacant. Among occupied housing units, 64.8% were owner-occupied and 35.2% were renter-occupied. The homeowner vacancy rate was 1.9% and the rental vacancy rate was 11.5%.

=== 2010 census ===
As of the 2010 United States census, there were 70,990 people living in the county. 59.8% were White, 17.5% Native American, 11.3% Black or African American, 0.6% Asian, 2.6% of some other race and 8.2% of two or more races. 5.2% were Hispanic or Latino (of any race). 16.7% were of American, 8.2% German and 7.3% Irish ancestry.

=== 2000 census ===
As of the census of 2000, there were 69,451 people, 26,458 households, and 18,467 families living in the county. The population density was 33/km^{2} (85/mi^{2}). There were 29,575 housing units at an average density of 14/km^{2} (36/mi^{2}). The racial makeup of the county was 63.73% White, 13.16% Black or African American, 14.88% Native American, 0.58% Asian, 0.03% Pacific Islander, 1.19% other races, and 6.43% from two or more races. 2.67% of the population were Hispanic or Latino of any race.

There were 26,458 households, of which 31.80% had children under the age of 18 living with them, 52.80% were married couples living together, 13.30% had a female householder with no husband present, and 30.20% were non-families. 26.70% of all households were made up of individuals; 12.30% were someone living alone who was 65 years of age or older. The average household size was 2.51, and the average family size was 3.03.

The age distribution of the population was 25.90% under the age of 18, 9.50% from 18 to 24, 26.70% from 25 to 44, 22.60% from 45 to 64, and 15.30% 65 or older. The median age was 37 years. For every 100 females there were 93.30 males. For every 100 females age 18 and over, there were 88.90 males.

The median income of households in the county was $28,438, and the median income per family was $34,793. Males had a median income of $28,670 versus $20,457 for females. The per capita income for the county was $14,828. About 14.10% of families and 17.90% of the population were below the poverty line, including 24.00% of those under age 18 and 14.70% of those age 65 or over.

== Politics ==
Donald Trump beat Hillary Clinton 62%-33% in 2016, which was a sharp right-turn from the competitive totals from Barack Obama's efforts in the prior two elections. Trump went on to beat Joe Biden by an even greater margin in 2020.

In February 2022, Republicans held a plurality of registered voters in Muskogee County for the first time in recent history.

Voter Registration and Party Enrollment as of June 30, 2023
Party	Number of Voters	Percentage
Republican	16,781	45.70%
Democratic	13,723	37.38%
Libertarian	273	0.74%
Unaffiliated	5,939	16.18%
Total	36,716	100%

United States presidential election results for Muskogee County, Oklahoma
Year	Republican		Democratic		Third party(ies)	
Year	No.	%	No.	%	No.	%
1908	3,592	54.75%	2,793	42.57%	176	2.68%
1912	2,385	36.05%	3,681	55.65%	549	8.30%
1916	2,532	36.82%	4,004	58.23%	340	4.94%
1920	5,187	44.47%	6,378	54.68%	99	0.85%
1924	6,158	44.96%	6,895	50.34%	644	4.70%
1928	9,972	60.92%	6,343	38.75%	54	0.33%
1932	5,351	29.77%	12,621	70.23%	0	0.00%
1936	6,452	32.54%	13,344	67.30%	33	0.17%
1940	9,585	42.50%	12,917	57.28%	49	0.22%
1944	8,280	41.42%	11,679	58.42%	31	0.16%
1948	6,592	32.23%	13,860	67.77%	0	0.00%
1952	11,810	47.53%	13,040	52.47%	0	0.00%
1956	11,057	51.50%	10,413	48.50%	0	0.00%
1960	12,403	52.81%	11,082	47.19%	0	0.00%
1964	8,508	34.25%	16,330	65.75%	0	0.00%
1968	8,707	38.39%	9,377	41.34%	4,596	20.26%
1972	15,161	65.65%	7,380	31.96%	551	2.39%
1976	10,287	40.89%	14,678	58.35%	190	0.76%
1980	11,511	44.76%	13,341	51.88%	863	3.36%
1984	14,652	53.90%	12,343	45.41%	188	0.69%
1988	11,147	44.47%	13,760	54.89%	161	0.64%
1992	8,782	31.44%	13,619	48.76%	5,531	19.80%
1996	8,974	35.64%	12,963	51.48%	3,243	12.88%
2000	11,820	47.87%	12,520	50.70%	353	1.43%
2004	15,124	54.58%	12,585	45.42%	0	0.00%
2008	15,289	57.51%	11,294	42.49%	0	0.00%
2012	13,404	57.39%	9,952	42.61%	0	0.00%
2016	15,043	62.12%	7,977	32.94%	1,196	4.94%
2020	16,526	65.89%	8,027	32.00%	528	2.11%
2024	16,550	67.95%	7,400	30.38%	407	1.67%

== Economy ==
At statehood, the economy was based primarily on agriculture and ranching. The main crops in the county were corn, cotton, and wheat. Agricultural service industries consisted mainly of cotton gins, grain mills, and stockyards. Cotton production declined dramatically during the Great Depression and was replaced by soybeans, wheat, feed grains, and grasses. Truck farming became important during and after World War II, leading to the development of a canning and food-processing industry.

Other economic activities included oil, gas, and coal production, but these activities never reached the levels achieved in other regions. Sand and gravel pits, along with brick and glass manufacturing, developed and remained important employment sources. O. W. Coburn built an optical business that became one of the largest in the nation and employed hundreds of workers. Other industrialists included the Buddrus family, who began Acme Engineering, and the Rooney family who founded Manhattan Construction. State and federal employment has long been important, primarily in education and veterans' services. Light manufacturing and health care as well as social services provide jobs for residents. The town of Taft has two state correctional facilities, Dr. Eddie Warrior Correctional Center for women and Jess Dunn Correctional Center for men.

Steamboats had plied the Arkansas River throughout much of the nineteenth and early twentieth century. The McClellan-Kerr Arkansas River Navigation System, dedicated in 1971, opening the Arkansas and Verdigris rivers to year-round commercial traffic and leading to the development of the Port of Muskogee.

== Education ==
Education was a high priority after the Civil War, with schools started by churches, private individuals, and the Cherokee and Creek nations. Higher educational opportunities were offered after 1880 when Bacone College, Oklahoma's oldest, began as Indian University in Tahlequah, but was moved to the Creek Nation in present Muskogee County in 1885. Evangel Mission, a school at Union Agency for Creek freedmen, operated in the 1880s and now houses the Five Civilized Tribes Museum in Muskogee. A facility for educating visually impaired people opened at Fort Gibson in 1898. Later moved to Muskogee, it became the Oklahoma School for the Blind. Minerva Home, a school for girls in Muskogee, became Henry Kendall College in 1894, which moved to Tulsa and became the University of Tulsa in 1920. Northeastern State University opened a branch campus in Muskogee in 1994.

K-12 school districts:

- Braggs Public Schools
- Checotah Public Schools
- Fort Gibson Public Schools
- Gore Public Schools
- Haskell Public Schools
- Hilldale Public Schools
- Midway Public Schools
- Muskogee Public Schools
- Oktaha Public Schools
- Porum Public Schools
- Wainwright Public School - Elementary school only
- Warner Public Schools
- Webbers Falls Public Schools

State-operated schools in this county:

- Oklahoma School for the Blind (Muskogee)

== Communities ==
=== Cities ===
- Haskell
- Muskogee (county seat)

=== Towns ===
- Boynton
- Braggs
- Council Hill
- Fort Gibson
- Oktaha
- Porum
- Summit
- Taft
- Wainwright
- Warner
- Webbers Falls

=== Census-designated places ===
- Briartown
- Keefton
- Norwood (mostly in Cherokee County)
- River Bottom
- Sand Hill
- Simms
- Sour John

=== Other unincorporated place ===
- Pumpkin Center

== Notable people ==
- Tom Coburn (1948–2020), lived in Muskogee; served in U. S. House of Representatives (1995–2001); served as U.S. Senator from Oklahoma (1995–2014);
- Drew Edmondson (b. 1946), was elected attorney general for Oklahoma (1995–2011); ran unsuccessfully for governor of Oklahoma in 2010 and 2018.
- Edmond Edmondson (1919–1990), served the Second Congressional District, which includes Muskogee County, from 1953 to 1973.
- J. Howard Edmondson (1925–1971), born in Muskogee, served as Oklahoma governor (1959–63) and senator (1963–64).
- Charles N. Haskell (1860–1933), settled in Muskogee in 1901 and became a leader at the Sequoyah Convention and Oklahoma's first governor in 1907.
- Robert L. Owen (1856–1947), a Cherokee, served as the U.S. agent to the Five Civilized Tribes in Muskogee. In 1907 he became one of Oklahoma's first U.S. senators.
- Pleasant Porter (1840–1907), principal chief of the Creek Nation, negotiated the allotment treaty with the Dawes Commission. He served as president of the Sequoyah Convention.
- Alexander Posey (1873–1908), a Creek poet and newspaper editor in Muskogee, was secretary of the Sequoyah Convention and is credited with writing most of that constitution.
- Alice M. Robertson (1854–1931), the first woman appointed postmaster of a Class A post office in the United States, in 1920 was elected to the U.S. House of Representatives. She was the second woman in the United States to hold a congressional seat and was the only woman to serve Oklahoma in Congress until Mary Fallin was elected in 2006.
- Belle Starr (1848–1899), American outlaw; lived in the Cookson Hills in eastern Muskogee County.
- Mike Synar (1950–1996) served in Congress from 1979 to 1995.

== NRHP sites ==
The following sites in Muskogee County are listed on the National Register of Historic Places:

- Administration Building - Post Hospital, Fort Gibson
- Central Baptist Church, Muskogee
- Cherokee National Cemetery, Fort Gibson
- Commandant's Quarters, Fort Gibson
- V. R. Coss House, Muskogee
- Dragoon Commandant's Quarters, Fort Gibson
- W.E.B. DuBois School, Summit
- Escoe Building, Muskogee
- First Baptist Church, Muskogee
- F. B. Fite House and Servant's Quarters, Muskogee
- Grant Foreman House, Muskogee
- Fort Davis, Muskogee
- Fort Gibson, Fort Gibson
- 1876 Indian Administration Building, Muskogee
- Manhattan Building, Muskogee
- Manual Training High School for Negroes, Muskogee
- George A. Murphy House, Muskogee
- Muskogee County Courthouse, Muskogee
- Nancy Taylor No. 1 Oil Well Site, Haskell
- Nash-Swindler House, Fort Gibson
- Officer's Quarters, Fort Gibson
- Oktaha School, Oktaha
- A. W. Patterson House, Muskogee
- Post Adjutant's Office, Fort Gibson
- Post Blacksmith Shop, Fort Gibson
- Pre-Statehood Commercial District, Muskogee
- Railway Exchange Building, Muskogee
- Andrew W. Robb House, Muskogee
- Seawell-Ross-Isom House, Fort Gibson
- Severs Hotel, Muskogee
- Sheltered Shelter District, Warner
- St. Thomas Primitive Baptist Church, Summit
- Surety Building, Muskogee
- Taft City Hall, Taft
- A. C. Trumbo House, Muskogee
- Union Agency, Muskogee
- United States Post Office and Courthouse, Muskogee
- Ward Chapel AME Church, Muskogee
- J. C. Welch House, Muskogee
