= Keefton, Oklahoma =

- Census-designated place
- Location within Oklahoma Location within the United States
- Coordinates: 35°34′37″N 95°18′23″W
- Country: United States
- State: Oklahoma
- County: Muskogee

Area
  - Total: 20.14 sq mi (52.16 km^{2})
  - Land: 19.71 sq mi (51.05 km^{2})
  - Water: 0.43 sq mi (1.11 km^{2})
- Elevation: 545 ft (166 m)

Population (2020)
  - Total: 732
  - Density: 37.1/sq mi (14.34/km^{2})
- Time zone: UTC-6 (Central (CST))
  - Summer (DST): UTC-5 (CDT)
- ZIP Codes: 74403 (Muskogee); 74469 (Warner); 74450 (Oktaha)
- Area code: 580
- GNIS feature ID: 2807007
- FIPS code: 40-38850

Keefton (also known as Keefeton) is an unincorporated community and census-designated place (CDP) in Muskogee County, Oklahoma, United States. As of the 2020 census, the population was 732.

== History ==
On May 23, 1973, an F4 tornado hit Keefeton directly, obliterating 75% of the town. The tornado traveled in a southwest to northeast direction, with five deaths—four of which were in a pickup truck that was rolled for approximately 1/2 mile.

A tornado measuring EF1 on the Enhanced Fujita Scale struck near Keefeton on May 15, 2020.

== Geography ==
The community is on U.S. Highway 64, 11 miles (18 km) south of downtown Muskogee and 8 miles (13 km) north of Interstate 40 at Warner.

According to the U.S. Census Bureau, the Keefton CDP has a total area of 20.1 square miles (52 km^{2}), of which 19.7 square miles (51 km^{2}) are land and 0.4 square miles (1.0 km^{2}), or 2.13%, are water. The northern edge of the CDP follows Spaniard Creek, while the southern edge follows Dirty Creek, both of which are east-flowing tributaries of the Arkansas River, which passes 4 miles (6 km) northeast of Keefton.

== Demographics ==
Historical population
Census	Pop.	Note	%±
2020	732		—
U.S. Decennial Census

=== 2020 census ===
Keefton was first listed as a census-designated place at the 2020 census.

As of the 2020 census, Keefton had a population of 732. The median age was 41.0 years. 24.0% of residents were under the age of 18 and 18.9% of residents were 65 years of age or older. For every 100 females there were 89.6 males, and for every 100 females age 18 and over there were 91.7 males age 18 and over.

0.0% of residents lived in urban areas, while 100.0% lived in rural areas.

There were 266 households in Keefton, of which 29.3% had children under the age of 18 living in them. Of all households, 61.7% were married-couple households, 16.2% were households with a male householder and no spouse or partner present, and 18.4% were households with a female householder and no spouse or partner present. About 27.5% of all households were made up of individuals and 14.7% had someone living alone who was 65 years of age or older.

There were 307 housing units, of which 13.4% were vacant. The homeowner vacancy rate was 0.0% and the rental vacancy rate was 4.8%.

Racial composition as of the 2020 census
Race	Number	Percent
White	415	56.7%
Black or African American	4	0.5%
American Indian and Alaska Native	191	26.1%
Asian	4	0.5%
Native Hawaiian and Other Pacific Islander	0	0.0%
Some other race	7	1.0%
Two or more races	111	15.2%
Hispanic or Latino (of any race)	26	3.6%
