= Dirty Creek =

Dirty Creek may refer to:

- Dirty Creek (Arkansas), a stream in Johnson County
- Dirty Creek (Oklahoma), a stream in Muskogee and McIntosh Counties
- Dirty Creek, New South Wales, a locality in Mid-Coast Council in New South Wales, Australia
