= Lee Wilder Thomas =

- Born: August 15, 1873; Springfield & Tehuacana, Limestone County, Texas
- Died: April 11, 1953 (aged 79); Muskogee, Oklahoma
- Other names: Rev. L.W. Thomas, Elder L.W. Thomas
- Occupation: Oil Tycoon
- Known for: President of The Primitive Baptist National Convention (1932-1934)

Lee Wilder Thomas, known as Rev. L.W. Thomas (August 15, 1873 - April 11, 1953), was a prominent African-American business and oil man. L.W. Thomas was among the lucky land owners in the Mexia, Texas, oil field. In the early 1930s, he partnered with Jake Simmons, Jr., another wealthy African-American oil broker. Together, these two men built Simmons Royalty Co., one of the leading African-American oil and mineral right royalty companies in the state of Oklahoma.

== Early life ==
Born in Springfield or Tehuacana, Limestone County, Texas, L.W. was the only child born to Boss Thomas and Bettie Arbuckle. His father, Boss Thomas, was an early Alabamian who migrated and re-settled in Texas.

As a young boy, while attending the Sardis Primitive Baptist Church, Mexia, Limestone County, Texas, he felt a calling to preach the gospel. He received his early education in Mexia, and would later attend and graduate college from Wiley College in Marshall, Texas. After graduating college L.W. married Clemmie Estella Ross in 1895. This union would produce thirteen children.

== Oil business ==
In 1912 a large natural gas deposit was discovered by the Mexia Gas and Oil Company. Oil was discovered in 1920. L.W. Thomas was among the lucky land owners in the 1920 Mexia oilfield strike. He had ten producing oil wells on his property.

The excitement of booming fields in three counties fostered crime and social problems that forced Governor Pat Morris Neff, on January 12, 1922, to order martial law for Justice Precinct No. 4 in Limestone County and No. 5 in Freestone County to deal with robberies, gambling, and alcohol sales. But the boom rolled on, and at the end of 1922 the fields showed a markedly increased combined yearly yield of nearly 34.8 million barrels of oil.

== Summit, Oklahoma ==
L.W. Thomas came to Oklahoma with a vision of establishing a model community, Summit, for African-Americans, located on the Jefferson Highway (U.S. 69), 8 miles (13 km) southwest of Muskogee. He invested more than $100,000 in Muskogee County real estate. He divided the site into lots and put them up for sale, as well as surrounding property which he divided into small farms. He said the land was to be sold to African-Americans with preference being given to those from Texas.

He had already erected a building housing a general store and another as a real estate office. A cotton gin was under construction, and workmen were working around the clock to have it finished for the fall crop. He had built a $12,000 house on a nearby hill and was reserving adjoining lots for additional better class homes.

In addition to growing cotton and peanuts, he was going to encourage the growing of vegetables for the Muskogee and Tulsa market. The 1932 Muskogee City Directory indicated that L.W. Thomas was president of the Jake Simmons, Jr., Simmons Royalty Co.

=== St. Thomas Primitive Baptist Church ===
St. Thomas Primitive Baptist Church is a historic church building in Summit. It was erected in 1922 by the Rev. L.W. Thomas. The building was placed on the National Register of Historic Places in 2004.
