= Haskell High School =

Haskell High School may refer to:

- Haskell High School in Haskell, Texas, part of the Haskell Consolidated Independent School District
- Haskell High School in Haskell, Oklahoma, part of Haskell Public Schools
- Haskell Institute, predecessor of Haskell Indian Nations University
