= Bob Dunlap =

American football player (1912–1966)

No. 30, 12
- Positions: Quarterback, safety

Personal information
- Born: October 29, 1912; Haskell, Oklahoma, U.S.
- Died: July 30, 1966 (aged 53); London, England
- Listed height: 6 ft 1 in (1.85 m)
- Listed weight: 191 lb (87 kg)

Career information
- High school: Haskell
- College: Oklahoma

Career history
- Chicago Bears (1935); New York Giants (1936)
- Stats at Pro Football Reference

Robert Louis Dunlap (October 29, 1912 – July 30, 1966) was an American professional football player who was a quarterback and safety in the National Football League (NFL) with the Chicago Bears and New York Giants. He played college football for the Oklahoma Sooners.

== Early life ==
Robert Louis Dunlap was born on October 29, 1912, in Haskell, Oklahoma. He played high school football at Haskell High School, earning All-State honors as a senior in 1929.

== College career ==
Dunlap enrolled at the University of Oklahoma to play college football for the Sooners. He was on the freshman team in 1930 and was a three-year varsity letterman from 1931 to 1933. The Oklahoma News said Dunlap was a triple-threat quarterback, meaning he was adept at passing, running, or kicking the ball. He garnered Associated Press first-team All-Big Six Conference recognition in both 1932 and 1933 at quarterback.

== Professional career ==
Dunlap played in all 12 games, starting one at quarterback, for the Chicago Bears during the 1936 season. He was listed as a quarterback/safety. He totaled 11 completion on 37 passing attempts (29.7%) for 121 yards, one touchdown, and two interceptions, seven rushing attempts for -16 yards, and one reception for nine yards.

In 1936, Dunlap's contract was purchased by the New York Giants. He appeared in five games for the Giants as a reserve tailback/safety, completing zero of one passes while carrying the ball eight times for 20 yards. Dunlap said that the difference between college and pro football is about the same as the difference between high school and college football.

== Personal life ==
While on a business trip in London, England, Dunlap died of a heart attack on July 30, 1966.
