= Escoe Building =

- U.S. National Register of Historic Places
- Location within Oklahoma Location within the United States
- Location: 228-230 N. 2nd St., Muskogee, Oklahoma
- Coordinates: 35°44′58.32″N 95°22′8″W
- Area: less than one acre
- Built: 1908
- Architect: W.T. Escoe
- NRHP reference No.: 83002094
- Added to NRHP: July 14, 1983

The Escoe Building (also known as the Simmons Building) was a historic commercial building located at 228-230 North Second Street in Muskogee, Oklahoma.

== Description and history ==
It was a two-story brick office building built in 1908 and demolished in 1988.

The Escoe Building was the only professional building in Muskogee's black district and housed the first black-owned bank in Oklahoma. It was also known as the Simmons Building because it housed the Simmons Royalty Co., Oklahoma's first major oil business owned by a black family.

It was listed on the National Register of Historic Places on July 14, 1983.
