= A. C. Trumbo House =

Historic house in Oklahoma, United States

- U.S. National Register of Historic Places
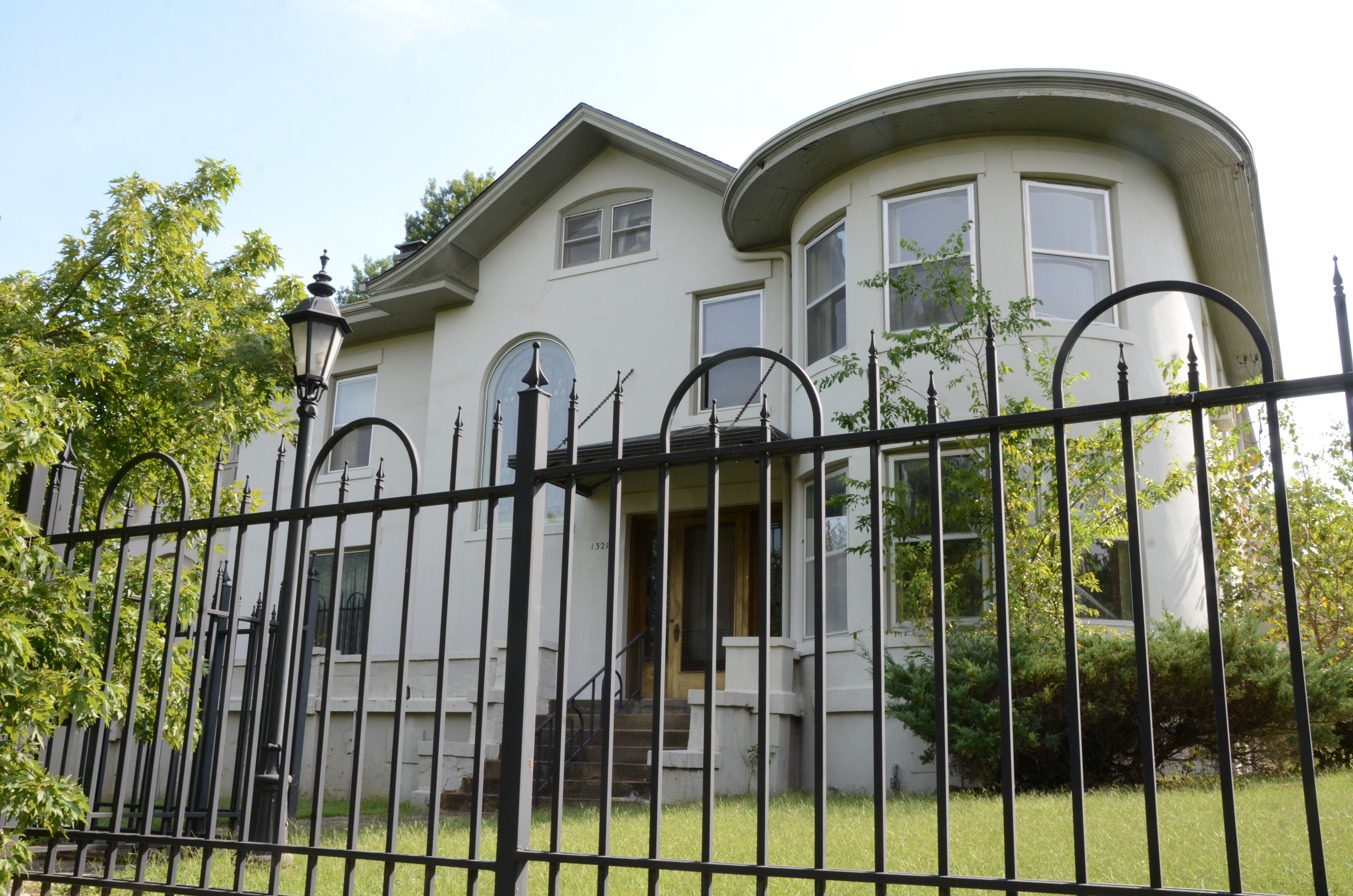

- Location within Oklahoma Location within the United States
- Location: 1321 West Broadway, Muskogee, Oklahoma
- Coordinates: 35°45′13.16″N 95°23′1.39″W
- Built: 1906
- Architectural style: Prairie School
- MPS: Territorial Homes of Muskogee TR
- NRHP reference No.: 84003334
- Added to NRHP: May 2, 1984

The A. C. Trumbo House is a house in Muskogee, Oklahoma, United States. It was built in 1906 for Arthur C. Trumbo as a replica of one of Mark Twain's houses and is on the National Register of Historic Places. The plot on which it stands was originally in the Creek Nation, Indian territory, before it was incorporated into Oklahoma on November 16, 1907.

It is a two-and-a-half-story house that is approximately 60 feet (18 m) by 100 feet (30 m) in size. It includes some elements of Prairie Style architecture: long eaves "creating a horizontal quality", several banded windows, the central portion lifted higher than flanking wings, a floral-patterned stained glass window.

== NRHP Application discussion ==
This was one of five historic residences that were nominated in a group, titled "Territorial Homes of Muskogee." The houses in this group include:

- A. C. Trumbo House,
- J.C. Welch House,
- A. W. Patterson Home,
- Coss Home, and
- Murphy Home.

All of these houses were built in the same time period (1904-1907), shortly before the end of the Territorial Period. They are all in good condition and continue in service as residences. There have been no alterations significant enough to disturb their historic character.

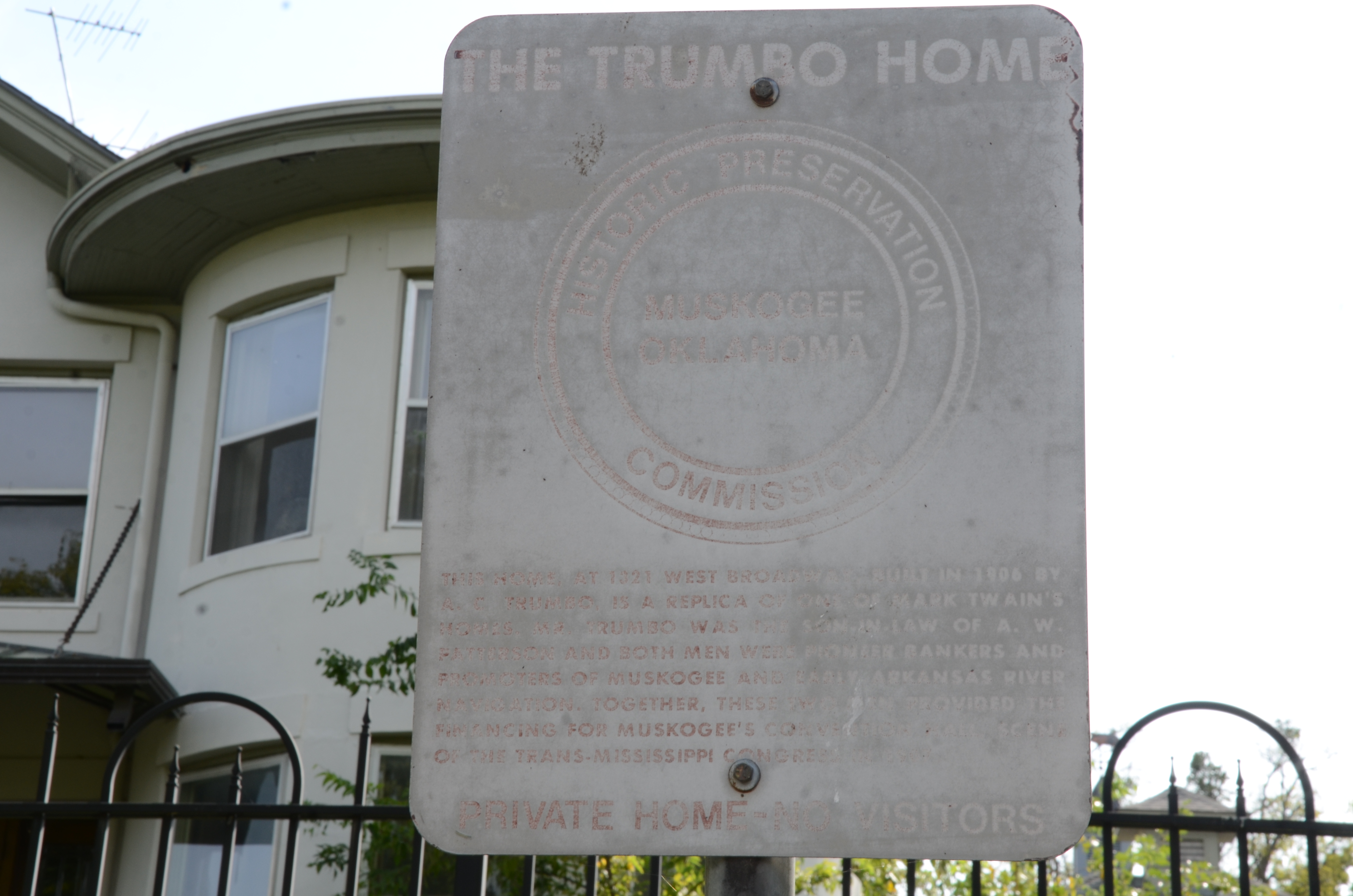
Sign placed outside the Trumbo House by the Oklahoma Historic Preservation Commission

Text of the badly faded sign reads: "This home, at 1321 West Broadway, built in 1906 by A.C. Trumbo, is a replica of one of Mark Twain's homes. Mr. Trumbo was the son-in-law of A.W. Patterson, and both men were pioneer bankers and promoters of Muskogee and early Arkansas River navigation. Together these two men provided the financing for Muskogee's Convention Hall, scene of the Trans-Mississippi Congress of 1907."

== Historical significance of A. C. Trumbo ==
Trumbo and Patterson had co-founded the Bank of Muskogee in 1901, before Oklahoma became a state. (Note: The Bank of Muskogee became Muskogee National Bank in 1908.) At the time the Trumbo house was built, Muskogee was within the Creek Nation in Indian Territory. It was the most populous and most commercially important city in the Territory. The two men provided financing for Muskogee's Convention Hall, which was built in 1907 to house the Trans-Mississippi Commercial Convention. (Note: Trumbo served as president of the Trans-Mississippi Commercial Convention in 1912.) Trumbo succeeded Patterson as president of Bank of Muskogee in 1918.

== Description ==
The A.C. Trumbo House was built in 1906, based on the design of a house belonging to Samuel Clemens (Mark Twain) that Mr. and Mrs. Trumbo visited during their honeymoon. The architecture includes elements of the Prairie style, such as:

- a central portion that rises slightly above the flanking wings,
- eaves extending well beyond the walls to create a horizontal quality,
- brick and stucco extending walls that delineate the entrance and rear terrace,
- leaded glass sidelights that flank the entry door,
- a floriated stained glass window serving as the focal point of the facade.
