= Sand Hill, Oklahoma =

- Census-designated place
- Location within Oklahoma Location within the United States
- Coordinates: 35°38′03″N 95°12′04″W
- Country: United States
- State: Oklahoma
- County: Muskogee

Area
  - Total: 7.60 sq mi (19.69 km^{2})
  - Land: 7.60 sq mi (19.69 km^{2})
  - Water: 0 sq mi (0.00 km^{2})
- Elevation: 623 ft (190 m)

Population (2020)
  - Total: 339
  - Density: 44.6/sq mi (17.22/km^{2})
- Time zone: UTC-6 (Central (CST))
  - Summer (DST): UTC-5 (CDT)
- ZIP Code: 74423 (Braggs)
- FIPS code: 40-65240
- GNIS feature ID: 2409268

Sand Hill or Sand Hills is a census-designated place (CDP) in Muskogee County, Oklahoma, United States. The population was 339 at the 2020 census, down from 395 in 2010.

== Geography ==
Sand Hill is in eastern Muskogee County, bordered to the east by Oklahoma State Highway 10, to the north by the town of Braggs, to the west by River Bottom, and to the south by the Arkansas River. Via Highway 10, it is 21 miles (34 km) southeast of Muskogee, the county seat, and 11 miles (18 km) northwest of Gore.

According to the U.S. Census Bureau, the Sand Hill CDP has a total area of 7.6 square miles (20 km^{2}), all land.

== Demographics ==
Historical population
Census	Pop.	Note	%±
2000	422		—
2010	395		−6.4%
2020	339		−14.2%
U.S. Decennial Census

=== 2020 census ===
As of the 2020 census, Sand Hill had a population of 339. The median age was 46.9 years. 18.3% of residents were under the age of 18 and 20.4% of residents were 65 years of age or older. For every 100 females there were 184.9 males, and for every 100 females age 18 and over there were 191.6 males age 18 and over.

0.0% of residents lived in urban areas, while 100.0% lived in rural areas.

There were 145 households in Sand Hill, of which 25.5% had children under the age of 18 living in them. Of all households, 60.0% were married-couple households, 21.4% were households with a male householder and no spouse or partner present, and 13.8% were households with a female householder and no spouse or partner present. About 26.9% of all households were made up of individuals and 6.9% had someone living alone who was 65 years of age or older.

There were 188 housing units, of which 22.9% were vacant. The homeowner vacancy rate was 0.0% and the rental vacancy rate was 0.0%.

Racial composition as of the 2020 census
Race	Number	Percent
White	235	69.3%
Black or African American	0	0.0%
American Indian and Alaska Native	73	21.5%
Asian	0	0.0%
Native Hawaiian and Other Pacific Islander	0	0.0%
Some other race	0	0.0%
Two or more races	31	9.1%
Hispanic or Latino (of any race)	4	1.2%

=== 2000 census ===
As of the census of 2000, there were 422 people, 160 households, and 123 families residing in the CDP. The population density was 55.2 inhabitants per square mile (21.3/km^{2}). There were 169 housing units at an average density of 22.1/sq mi (8.5/km^{2}). The racial makeup of the CDP was 70.14% White, 18.96% Native American, 0.47% from other races, and 10.43% from two or more races. Hispanic or Latino of any race were 0.47% of the population.

There were 160 households, out of which 35.6% had children under the age of 18 living with them, 65.6% were married couples living together, 10.6% had a female householder with no husband present, and 23.1% were non-families. 20.6% of all households were made up of individuals, and 8.1% had someone living alone who was 65 years of age or older. The average household size was 2.64 and the average family size was 3.02.

In the CDP, the population was spread out, with 27.5% under the age of 18, 8.3% from 18 to 24, 27.7% from 25 to 44, 25.8% from 45 to 64, and 10.7% who were 65 years of age or older. The median age was 36 years. For every 100 females, there were 93.6 males. For every 100 females age 18 and over, there were 87.7 males.

The median income for a household in the CDP was $29,167, and the median income for a family was $34,167. Males had a median income of $29,028 versus $24,091 for females. The per capita income for the CDP was $14,609. About 11.3% of families and 13.5% of the population were below the poverty line, including 14.3% of those under age 18 and 25.0% of those age 65 or over.
