= L. R. Kershaw =

American businessman (1880–1969)

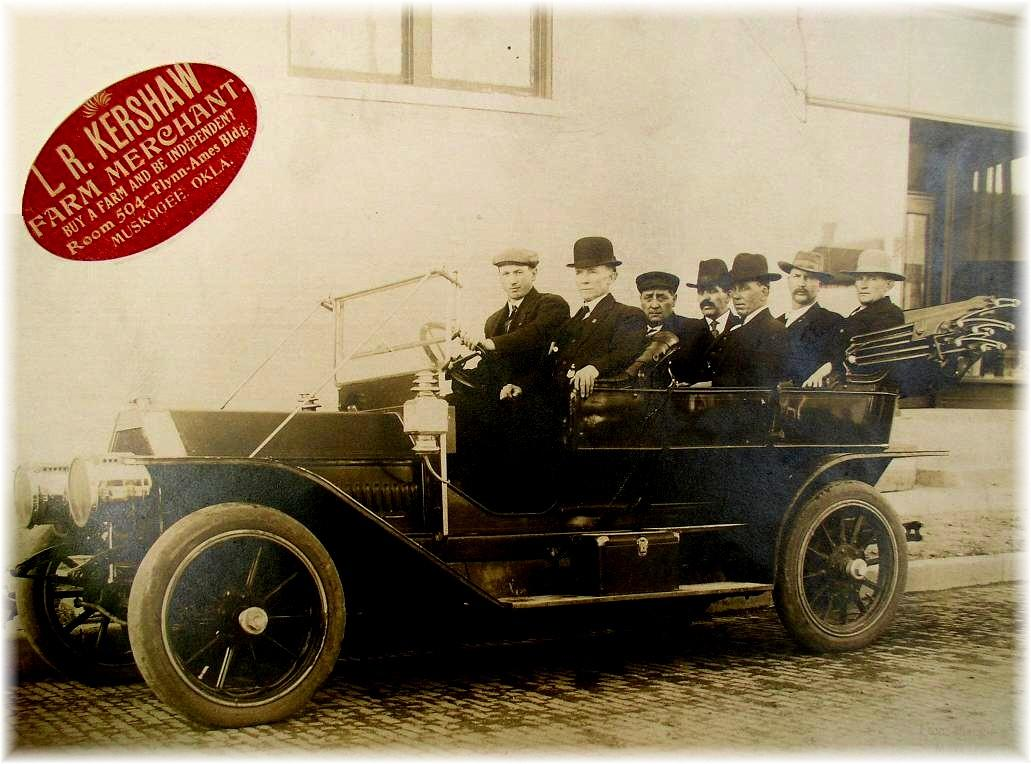
- L. R. Kershaw in Glide touring car selling farms in Oklahoma
- Born: Leroy Kershaw; December 6, 1880; Elmwood, Illinois, US
- Died: 1969 (aged 88–89)

Leroy Kershaw (1880–1969) was an American attorney, banker, businessman, cattleman and political candidate.

He is one of the pioneers of the Muskogee, Oklahoma, area and the founder of Morris, Oklahoma, in 1904. Kershaw was a delegate to the Republican National Convention in 1924, and was later a candidate for the Governor of Oklahoma in 1930. Kershaw was a founder of the Eastern Oklahoma Electric Traction Company, and a pure-bred Aberdeen Angus breeder, with over 500 head of cattle. His prize-winning herd of black angus cattle brought buyers from all over the country to his 4,000 acre (16 km²) farm south of Muskogee. His herd was the second largest herd in the country, and the largest herd in Oklahoma. His illustrious career began as a real estate salesman after graduating from college, which later expanded into banking, farm management, oil & gas development, real estate development, homebuilding, political service and pedigreed cattle breeding.

== Personal ==
L.R. Kershaw, also known as Leroy Kershaw, was born in Elmwood, Illinois, on December 6, 1880, to David R. Kershaw and Jennie M. (Cole) Kershaw. He was an outstanding athlete in high school, as an accomplished running back in football and as a champion discus thrower in track & field events. He was the leading scorer on the 1900 Elmwood High School football team, which was undefeated.

== Early Indian Territory and Oklahoma land development ==
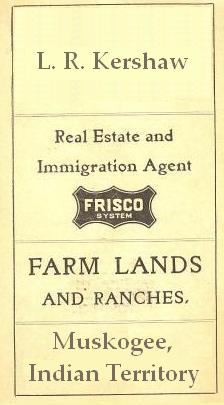
L. R. Kershaw, Frisco Railroad Land and Immigration Agent

Kershaw graduated from Elmwood, Illinois, High School and worked his way through college waiting tables, selling nursery stock and selling real estate. Kershaw graduated from the University of Illinois, Champaign-Urbana, Illinois, where he was a charter member of the honorary law fraternity, the Benjamin D. Magruder chapter of Phi Alpha Delta in 1904. Professionally, he first became an Immigrant Agent for the St. Louis-San Francisco Railway, also known as the Frisco railroad, selling land to farmers for farms along the wide railroad right-of way in Northeastern Oklahoma. He bought many farms along the way, and in 1904 moved to Oklahoma himself. He was one of the founders of the Farmer's State Bank in Morris (in 1905) and the First National Bank of Morris (in 1908), (Indian Territory) Oklahoma. In 1910 he purchased the controlling interest in the National Bank of Okmulgee, Oklahoma. With the connections he had established with the railroad, he platted the town site of Morris, Oklahoma. The town of Morris was named after H. E. Morris, a railroad executive with the Frisco railroad. The railroad went through the center of town, between Ft. Smith, Arkansas, and Tulsa, Oklahoma. The town of Morris was founded in 1904, before statehood. Oklahoma became a state in November 1907.

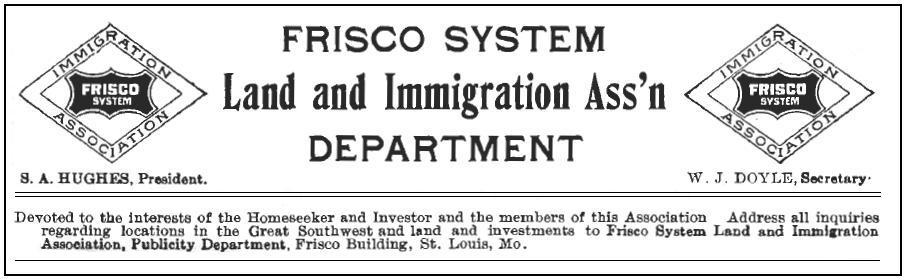
Frisco Land and Immigration Association Masthead

In Morris, Oklahoma, many of the street names were named after towns Kershaw was familiar with in Illinois, such as Elmwood, his place of birth, along with Pekin and Peoria. Hughes Street, the main street of Morris was named in honor of the General Immigration Agent for the Frisco Railroad, and President of the Frisco System Land & Immigration Association, Samuel A. Hughes. He also named a short street Frisco, after the railroad which brought him to Oklahoma, and streets were named after several presidents, including Washington, Adams, Jefferson, Madison, Monroe, Jackson as well as one after Benjamin Franklin, one of the early leaders of the United States.

Kershaw always maintained strong financial ties to Muskogee, including his appointment in 1910 as an agent for the Bartholomew Motor Company, of Peoria, Illinois, representing the Muskogee area. The Bartholomew Company produced the Glide (automobile company) car, an entry-level 4 to 7-passenger touring car. Kershaw used one of these touring cars to transport potential buyers interested in buying farms in the area. His appointment as an automobile dealer was short-lived as he foresaw the future being more profitable in the real estate sales and development business than in the sale of automobiles.

Kershaw was a delegate representing the City of Muskogee at the Trans-Mississippi Commercial Congress held in Kansas City, Missouri, in November 1911. In December 1911, Kershaw was a delegate representing the State of Oklahoma at the Nineteenth National Irrigation Congress in Chicago, IL. The Congress was influential in recommending conservation and reclamation of arid lands in the newly populated areas of the country. The Congress helped draft legislation for the creation of water reservoirs for the future drinking water and hydro-electric power generation needs of the country. Over time, Oklahoma developed more man-made reservoirs of water than any other state and today has more lakeshore frontage than any other state in the country, with the exception of Minnesota.

== Career in registered Aberdeen Angus exhibition and breeding ==
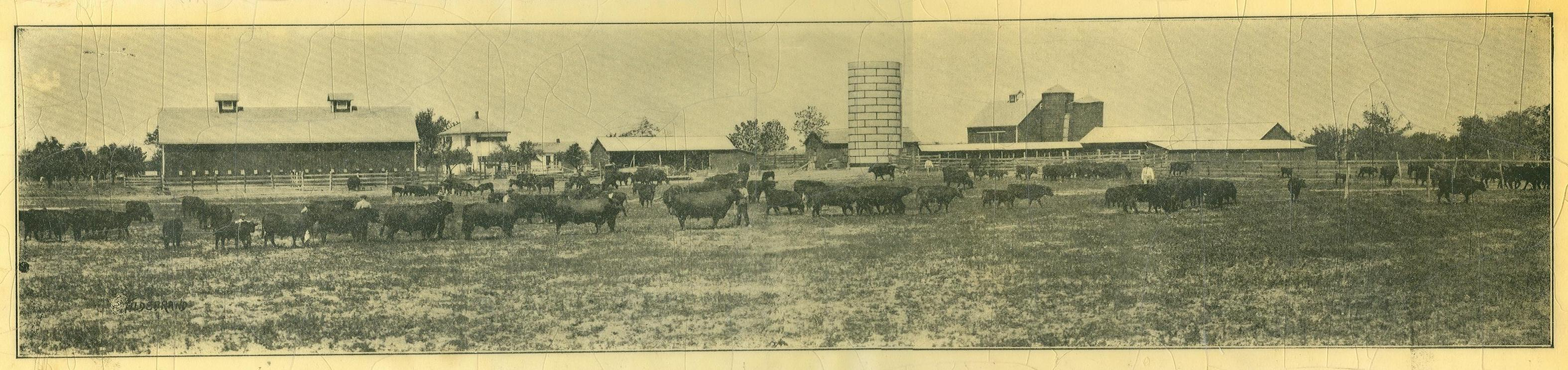
Kershaw Angus Farm about 1920

In 1912, Kershaw began a long career as a cattleman, with the initial purchase of a herd of registered Aberdeen Angus cattle from the Gatewood herd of Texas and the Nicholas herd in Iowa. He recognized the potential of raising high-quality show and breeding stock of a breed of cattle which were well-suited for the short grass of Oklahoma and the long, dry summers. Angus cattle could be cross-bred with the Texas longhorn, and the product would be a hornless breed of cattle. Angus bulls were popular with cattle breeders for their first cow because the calves would be small, and easy to deliver for the new cows. Kershaw was elected a Director of the Oklahoma Free State Fair in Muskogee in 1913. It was the largest free State Fair and exposition in Oklahoma at the time. On August 30, 1917, one of Kershaw's prize bulls, winner of 19 championships, Ben Hur of Lone Dell, was featured on the front cover of the Breeder's Gazette, the leading publication in the country at the time, advocating pedigreed cattle stock. Kershaw's champion herd was featured on the front page of the Oklahoma Employer Journal in February, 1918. Muskogee Boy the 1917 International Grand Champion Steer was pictured on the front cover of two magazines: the Ohio Farmer on March 23, 1918 and on the National Farmer Magazine in April, 1918. Plowman, the champion of champions, the winner of more laurels than any other bull, living or dead, was featured on the front cover of the Kansas Stockman magazine on May 1, 1920.

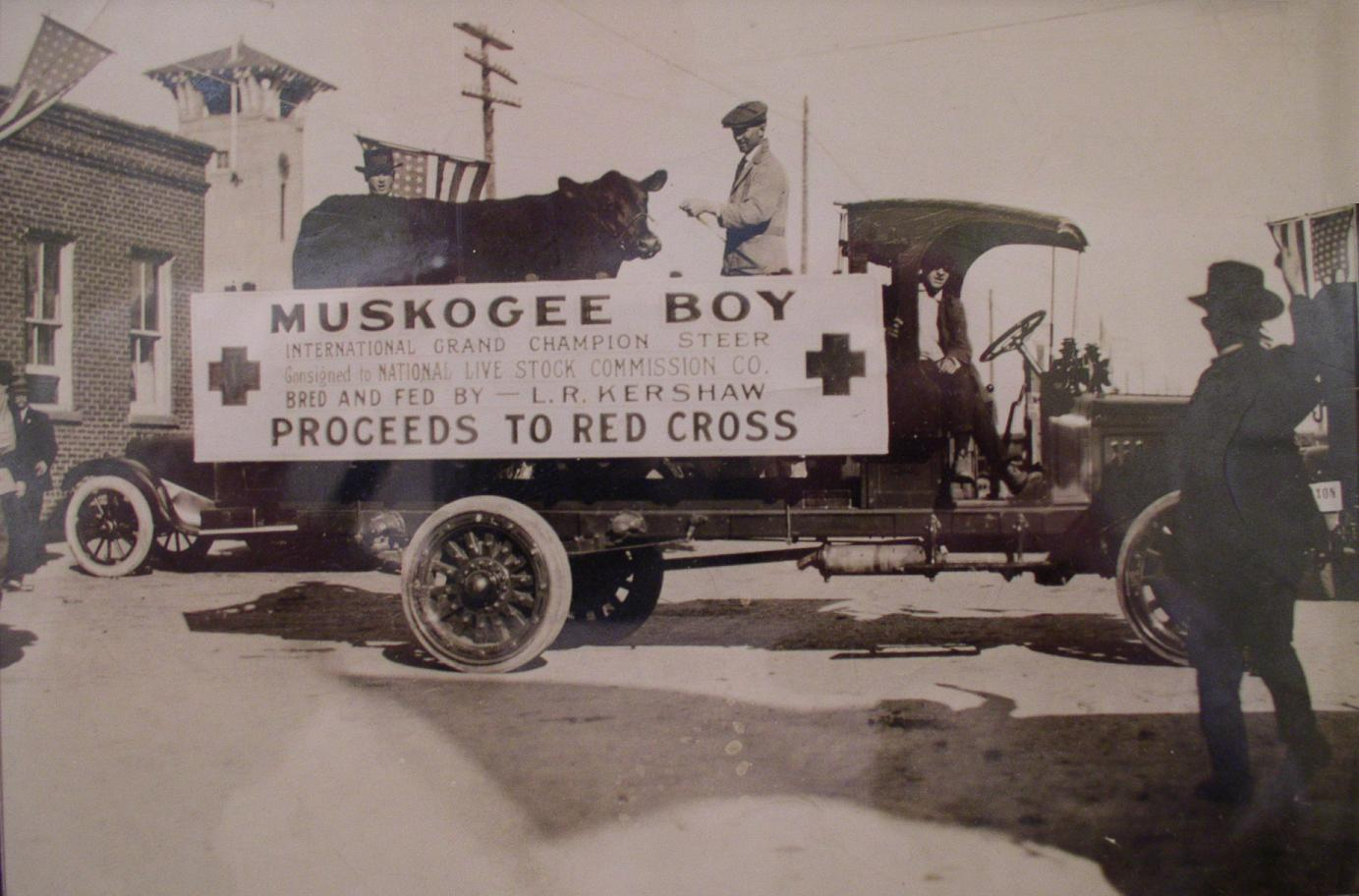
Muskogee Boy was sold for a world record price in 1918

Kershaw showed the Grand Champion Steer of All Breeds, Muskogee Boy at the International Livestock Exposition in Chicago in 1917. (Kershaw was the first Angus breeder from the Southwest to be honored with champion show cattle at the International.) In March 1918, this prize steer was offered for sale in a public auction held in the lobby of the Lee-Huckins Hotel in downtown Oklahoma City for the benefit of the American Red Cross. (The Lee-Huckins Hotel served as the State Capitol from 1910 to 1917).

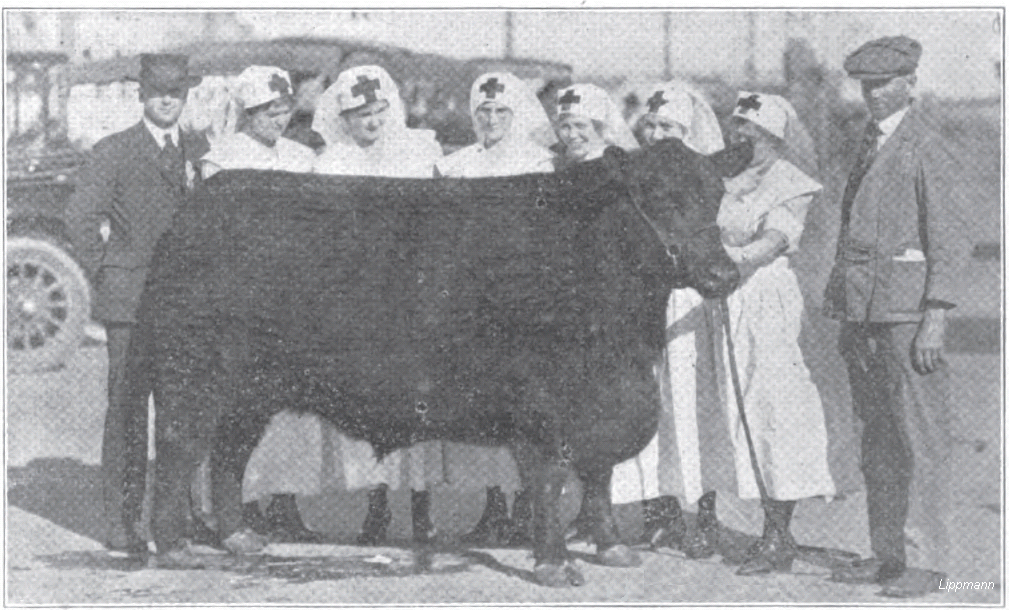
L. R. Kershaw with Red Cross nurses showing the Grand Champion Steer, Muskogee Boy

The auction brought $3.16 a pound for the steer, for a total of $5,890 for the Red Cross Fund. This sale price set a new world record for the sale of a champion steer. This was in the middle of World War I and the funds were used to help American soldiers. The coat from the steer was made into an overcoat for President Woodrow Wilson and the meat was processed for General "Blackjack" Pershing's staff in France who shared it with wounded soldiers. Later that year, Kershaw was elected President of the Southwest American Livestock Show, one of the premier livestock shows in the Southwest.

Whenever possible, Kershaw would use an International grand champion bull or a son of one in his breeding program. One such bull was Plowman (son of the 1911 International grand champion, Kloman). Kershaw purchased Plowman for $3,050 after he won his class at the 1917 International Livestock Exposition in Chicago, IL. In 1919, Kershaw won the Grand Champion Steer (over All Breeds) trophy, with Muskogee Boy II, the brother to Muskogee Boy at the Texas State Fair in Dallas. That same year, his prize bull, Plowman, won the Grand Champion Bull trophy at five of the nation's most prestigious livestock shows, including the American Royal Livestock Show in Kansas City, MO; the Southwest American Livestock Show in Oklahoma City, OK; the National Western Stock Show in Denver, CO; the Southwestern Exposition and Fat Stock Show, which was later named the Southwestern Exposition and Livestock Show in Fort Worth, TX and also at the Kansas National Live Stock Show in Wichita, KS.

After an extensive show career Plowman, (the Champion of Champions, who claimed 57 grand championships as a 2,250-lb. 3-year-old show bull, more championships than any other bull in America, living or dead) the bull was sold in Kershaw's 1920 sale for $40,000 – a price unheard of at that time and a world record for many years. The dispersion sale of his herd at his ranch south of Muskogee in 1920 brought experienced buyers from all over the country to bid on some of Kershaw's prize stock. In this sale was also included Twin Burn Pride 5th, crowned champion cow with 37 championships to her credit. He had intended to sell his complete herd at this 1920 sale, but instead held back one of his prize bulls and started all over with new cattle.

There has never been another herd of cattle that has shown over as wide an area of country and won so many premiums as that belonging to Kershaw. The Kershaw herd of registered Aberdeen Angus cattle won more championships than any other breeder in America. The herd had won 266 grand championships, 685 first-place rankings, 376-second-place, 186 third-place, 79 fourth-place and 53 fifth-place rankings, within a period of six years, bringing to the owner innumerable cups and silver trophies. His herd was shown in more than 22 cities in more than eight states in the Southwest and Midwest and in Canada.

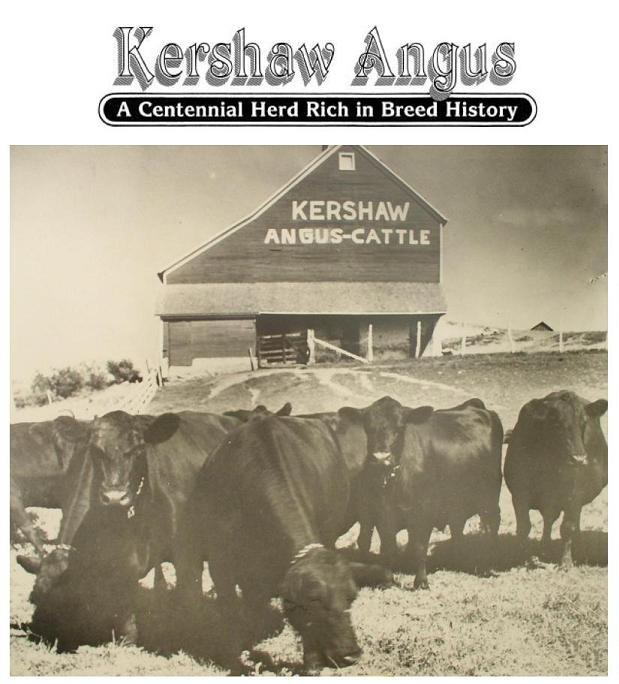
Kershaw Angus Farm ten (10) miles south of Muskogee near Oktaha, Oklahoma

As President of the Southwest American Livestock Show, he saw the need for a new facility to show cattle in Oklahoma City, which was founded in 1889. He convinced officials with the Armour and Company packing house in Chicago to contribute $200,000 charged to advertising to go towards the construction of a Livestock Pavilion at the Oklahoma City stockyards. The fund raising began in 1920 and the new facility, the largest of its kind in the Southwest, was completed in 1922. In its time, the Oklahoma City stockyards and its related suppliers became one of the largest industries in the city. Kershaw continued to serve on the board of directors of the Stock & Industrial Exposition in Tulsa, as a board member of the Oklahoma Free State Fair in Muskogee, and as board member of the Oklahoma Co-Operative Livestock Association.

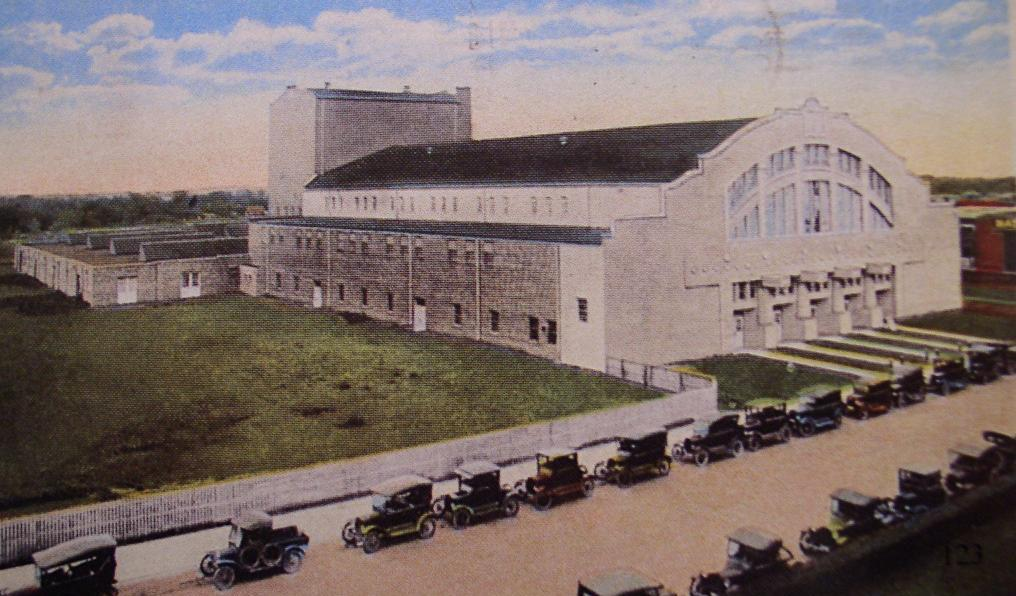
Oklahoma City Livestock Coliseum

He continued to raise show and breeding cattle through 1948. From 1916 through 1948 he served in various leadership capacities within the Oklahoma Aberdeen Angus Breeder's Association and the American Aberdeen Angus Breeder's Association, serving as President and director, respectively. At one time his herd was the second-largest registered and accredited Aberdeen Angus herd in the country. During the many years he raised and sold cattle, a number of luminaries would travel to his farm to bid on his prized cattle. They included James Cash Penney, the founder of the J. C. Penney stores; Tom Slick, a world-renowned oil man; C. R. Anthony, the founder of Anthony's stores; Armand Hammer, the Chairman of Occidental Petroleum and Robert S. Kerr, U. S. Senator from Oklahoma, the "uncrowned King of the Senate" from Oklahoma, and co-founder of the Kerr-McGee Company.

Foundation stock from the Kershaw Angus Farm formed the nucleus of such notable angus cattle herds around the country, including the Wye Plantation (James Boal Lingle) in Queenstown, MD; the KerMac Angus Ranch (Sen. Robert S. Kerr) in Poteau, OK; the Elton Angus Farm (Roy Bucklin) in Elton, LA; the Essar Ranch (Tom Slick) in San Antonio, TX; Emmadine Farms (J. C. Penney) in Hopewell Junction, NY and Sunbeam Farms (Judge Fullerton) in Miami, OK. In 1969, the same year he died, Kershaw's herd was formally recognized as one of the Pioneer Herds of North America by the American Angus Association.

== Public and political service ==
L.R. Kershaw hosting U S Vice President James S. Sherman to Oklahoma City, OK

Active in state politics since 1905, L. R. Kershaw was a delegate to Oklahoma State and Muskogee County conventions. In 1906 he was nominated to the Oklahoma Constitutional Convention for the 74th District of Indian Territory, which became the new state of Oklahoma in 1907. In 1910, a young L. R. Kershaw played host to James S. Sherman's visit to Oklahoma City, and was in the driver's seat during the tour of downtown Oklahoma City. Usually sporting a weathered cowboy (stockman's) hat, Kershaw (shown in the far right driver's seat, above) broke from tradition and wore a straw boater along with the rest of the welcoming party when they hosted the Vice President of the United States. The protective detail from the Secret Service and the Oklahoma City Police Department are wearing derby hats, police caps or dark cowboy hats. A year later, Sherman became the first sitting Vice President to fly in an airplane. Sherman was also the first Vice President to throw out the first ceremonial pitch at a professional baseball game, the first incumbent Vice President to be renominated by a National Convention, and the only Vice President whose marble bust in the U. S. Capitol is wearing eyeglasses.

As a public servant and as a business leader in his hometown of Muskogee, Oklahoma, Mr. Kershaw was a member of the Council of Defense during World War I. The Council responsibilities included the prevention of price gouging or seed hoarding by farmers and merchants during commodities shortages, and to allow all consumers equal protection against profiteering or seed shortages. From 1924 through 1926, he was the Muskogee County Republican Party chairman. In 1924, he was appointed as a delegate to the Republican National Convention held in the Public Auditorium in Cleveland, Ohio. He was instrumental in having the Puerto Rico delegation recognized in a convention that nominated Calvin Coolidge for the Presidency of the United States. While it is notable that Oklahoma was one of the few southern states that did not carry the Republican ticket, this election was the last one in modern history that New York City voted Republican, the first convention in history to be broadcast by nationwide radio and the first GOP convention to provide for equal representation by women.

That same year (1924), he caused a bit of a scandal when he filed for divorce proceedings against his first wife (Trallia Lott Kershaw, who bore their first son, William R Kershaw). Following the divorce, he married Clara Amanda Harrison, of Princeton, Indiana. Their first child, Patricia Ann was born the next year, in 1925. In 1927 they produced their first set of twins, Robert Eugene and Elizabeth "Betty" Kershaw and in 1933 they produced a second set of twins, Jean Mary and Joan Mary Kershaw. While Mr. Kershaw never served in the American military, his 2nd wife Clara could trace her ancestry back to the American Revolution, in which one of her ancestors, James Dowdle, served as a Revolutionary War soldier. She was a member of the Daughters of the American Revolution, United Daughters of the Confederacy and the Daughters of the American Colonists.

In 1930, Kershaw was a Republican candidate for the Governor of the state of Oklahoma. He withdrew early in the race when he observed that the populist Democratic candidate for governor, William "Alfalfa Bill" Murray would easily be elected in the heavily Democratic Oklahoma. In 1932, Kershaw was appointed by Governor Murray to the Oklahoma State Commission on the celebration of the George Washington Bicentennial. He was mentioned as a potential appointee to a number of other offices during that period, including the US Congress for the 2nd District in Oklahoma, for the State of Oklahoma Highway Commission, for the State of Oklahoma Election Board and for the Agricultural Credit Corporation during the Great Depression in the 1930s.

== Bank receiver for OCC, homebuilding and development ==
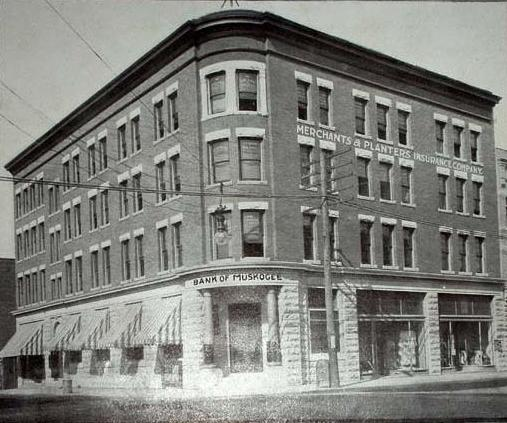
Muskogee-Security National Bank

Kershaw served as a Director of the American Aberdeen-Angus Breeder's Association from 1916 through 1920. Starting in 1926, and through the Great Depression he was appointed by the Office of the Comptroller of the Currency, (the OCC) the lead regulator for National Banks at the time, as the receiver for a number of national and state banks, located in three states. These banks included the Security National Bank of Muskogee, OK; the Muskogee National Bank, Muskogee, OK (these two banks were merged under his receivership to form the Muskogee-Security National Bank); Central State Bank of Muskogee, OK; the Guaranty Trust Company, Muskogee, OK; Producer's National Bank in Tulsa, OK, Exchange National Bank of Tulsa, OK, the First National Bank of Barnsdall, OK; the First National Bank of Collinsville, OK; the Central National Bank of Bartlesville, OK; the First National Bank of Oktaha, OK; the Commercial National Bank of Independence, KS; the Security National Bank of Independence, KS (which were merged under his Receivership to form the Commercial-Security National Bank); the Montgomery County National Bank, in Cherryvale, KS; the Hutching's First National Bank of Siloam Springs, AR and a number of others. At one time, he was receiver for 13 banks during the depression. It is notable that the Muskogee-Security National Bank (formerly known as the Iowa Building) was the first bank building in Muskogee, OK to have an electric elevator in the building and that the Exchange National Bank was the first bank building in Tulsa, OK to have an elevator, and was also the tallest building in Tulsa at the time. In 1930, he was appointed as Director of the Independent Petroleum Producer's Association.

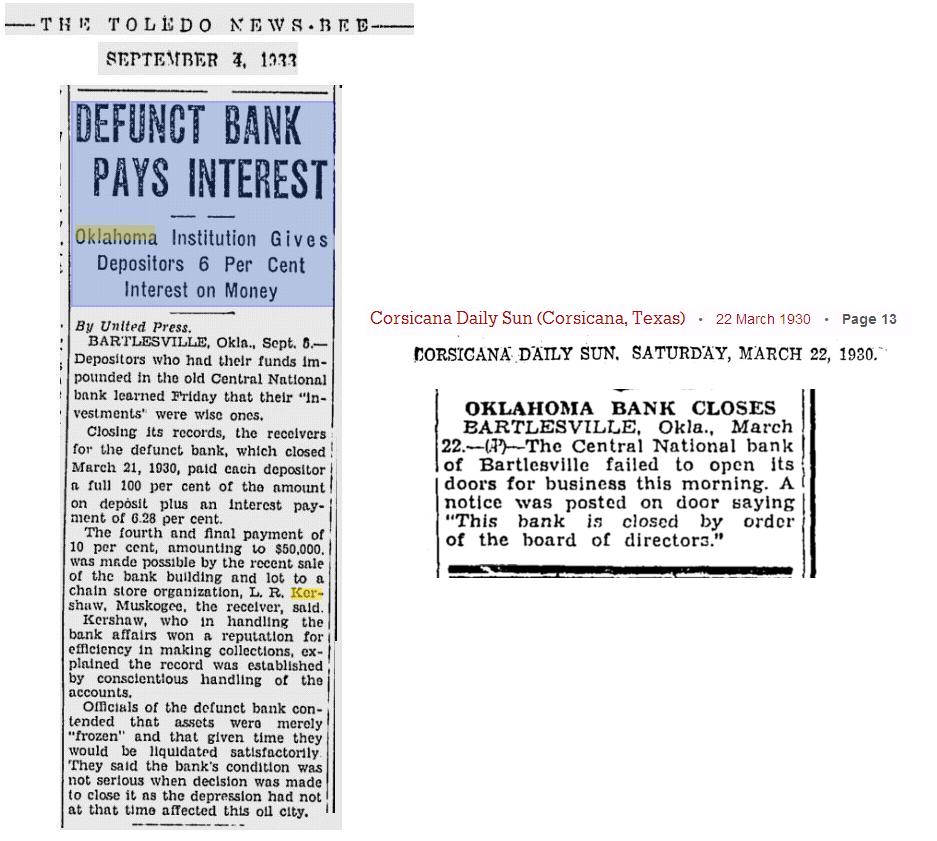
Central National Bank of Bartlesville

As early as 1923, Kershaw began developing residential lots on the west side of town for new single-family homes. During World War II he recognized the need to provide housing for the many returning veterans wishing to establish a home in Muskogee and he began platting residential subdivisions on the north and west side of Muskogee, to allow them to buy their first home a start raising a family. He financed many of these homes with his own capital, offering many first-time home buyers the opportunity to own their own home. Kershaw built homes in his subdivision using wood that came from disassembled Camp Gruber structures, a nearby Army training base (and POW camp). Many returning soldiers after the war were able to purchase these buildings made into four-room homes by making a small down payment. Kershaw used both contracts for deed and mortgages to enable the ex-GIs to afford their purchases with small monthly payments. These additions included Kershaw Heights, Kershaw Circle, Kershaw Acres, East Park Place, Ridge Crest Addition, Home Acres 1st and 2nd Additions, Lincoln Park and Carver's First Addition. In East Park Place and in Ridge Crest Addition he named streets after Aberdeen, Avondale and Oxford after regions in England and Scotland where the Aberdeen Angus cattle originated, and named Elmwood and Illinois streets after his Illinois hometown.

== Historic home ==
In 1943 he bought the former home of banker A. W. Patterson, and he continued to live there as his 6 children and many grandchildren grew up around a huge lot in the middle of town. The home had 5 bedrooms on the second floor and a large outdoor deck surrounded with rough-hewn Carthage stone quarried in Missouri. The home was built with a full basement with windows on 3 sides of the house, and had a completely finished attic. In later years, the home was equipped with an electric elevator which served passengers between the ground floor and the second floor of the home.

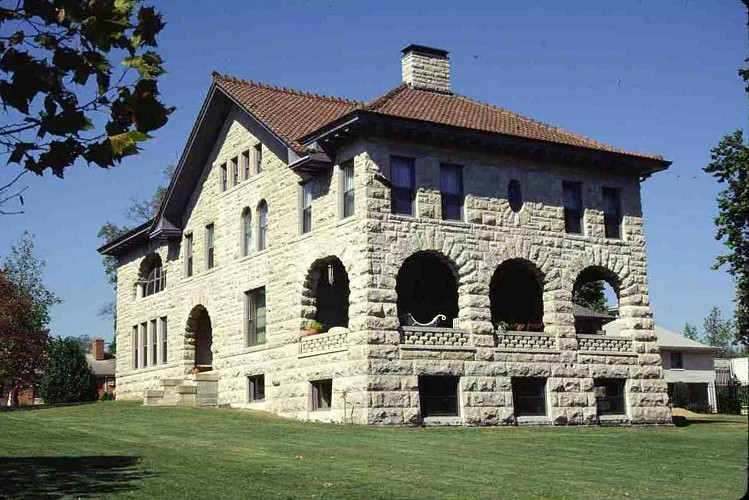
1320 West Okmulgee, Muskogee, OK

Built in 1906, (before Oklahoma statehood) at 1320 West Okmulgee, the former A. W. Patterson House in the City of Muskogee, Muskogee County, Oklahoma is one of the city's most prominent homes. Located at the intersection of 14th Street and West Okmulgee, it is situated at the crest of a hill near the western edge of the downtown Muskogee neighborhood.

The home features several Richardsonian Romanesque qualities including the limestone rock coursed ashlar wall finish, the round arched entryway and round arched window surrounds, and the low-pitched red clay tile-covered hip roof with cross gables in front. The home was designed by McKibban & McKibban, an architectural firm which designed many of Muskogee's early commercial buildings. It was built with four covered porches, including the main south entry, the north side entry from the detached garage, and two interior covered porches, one which opened from a second-floor guest bedroom and the main porch one which spreads the entire width of the home on the east side, overlooking downtown Muskogee to the east. The open covered porch on the east side of the home had its own source of water supply and was large enough to accommodate a full-size hammock.

The home has a full walkout basement, with several separate rooms. The large foyer entry way inside the main entry door on the south side has dual sidelight clear lead-glass windows with beveled panes behind carved stone benches which straddle the front porch. This porch, with nearly a dozen steps up to the front door is the scene of many historical family photos and group photos for civic and social organizations within the city. Large and prominent stained glass windows were featured in this grand stately home, with the most prominent one, more than 9 feet high and more than 12 feet wide, at the midpoint stair landing visible only from the back yard and driveway on the north side of the home, away from the main street.

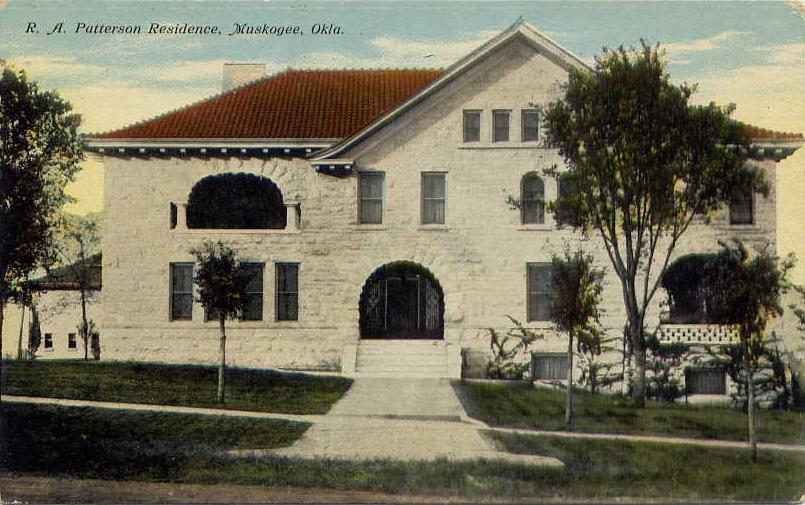
A W Patterson Residence, 1320 West Okmulgee, Muskogee, OK

The residence was the home of two prominent Muskogee businessmen. A. W. Patterson was co-founder of the Bank of Muskogee in 1901 which later was renamed the Muskogee National Bank and he served as its president until 1918. Kershaw was acquainted with Patterson first as a tenant in his Iowa Building in 1904, then later as the National Bank Receiver for the Muskogee-Security National Bank, and finally as the subsequent owner of the Patterson home. Patterson was the driving force in promoting the Arkansas River as a navigable body of water and was the instrumental figure in the construction of Muskogee's Convention Hall which was the site of the Trans-Mississippi Commercial Congress held in 1907. Patterson lived in the home until his death in 1916, and the home was occupied by his widow until her death in 1934. Kershaw purchased the home from the Patterson daughters.

Kershaw lived in the family home until his death in 1969 at the age of 88. The home remained in the Kershaw family until 1973, or four years after the death of L. R. Kershaw. The home was listed on the National Register of Historic Places, by the National Park Service in 1984 as property #84003322.

== Notes ==
Appointment of L. R. Kershaw as Receiver of the Hutching's First National Bank of Siloam Springs, Arkansas by the Comptroller of the Currency, J. W. Pole, November 2, 1931 http://www.co.washington.ar.us/Information/Chronicle/ChronicleScannedImage.asp?IN=Deed-286-117
