= River Bottom, Oklahoma =

- Census-designated place
- Location within Oklahoma Location within the United States
- Coordinates: 35°38′09″N 95°14′16″W
- Country: United States
- State: Oklahoma
- County: Muskogee

Area
  - Total: 9.36 sq mi (24.24 km^{2})
  - Land: 9.36 sq mi (24.24 km^{2})
  - Water: 0 sq mi (0.00 km^{2})
- Elevation: 584 ft (178 m)

Population (2020)
  - Total: 248
  - Density: 26.5/sq mi (10.23/km^{2})
- Time zone: UTC-6 (Central (CST))
  - Summer (DST): UTC-5 (CDT)
- ZIP Code: 74423 (Braggs)
- FIPS code: 40-63537
- GNIS feature ID: 2409182

River Bottom is an unincorporated community and census-designated place (CDP) in Muskogee County, Oklahoma, United States. The population was 248 at the 2020 census, up from 154 in 2010.

== Geography ==
River Bottom is in eastern Muskogee County, bordered to the west by the Arkansas River and to the east by the community of Sand Hill. It is 10 miles (16 km) southeast of Muskogee, the county seat, but 23 miles (37 km) by road.

According to the U.S. Census Bureau, the River Bottom CDP has a total area of 9.36 square miles (24.24 km^{2}), all land.

== Demographics ==
Historical population
Census	Pop.	Note	%±
2000	265		—
2010	154		−41.9%
2020	248		61.0%
U.S. Decennial Census

=== 2020 census ===
As of the 2020 census, River Bottom had a population of 248. The median age was 50.0 years. 21.0% of residents were under the age of 18 and 24.2% of residents were 65 years of age or older. For every 100 females there were 77.1 males, and for every 100 females age 18 and over there were 81.5 males age 18 and over.

0.0% of residents lived in urban areas, while 100.0% lived in rural areas.

There were 104 households in River Bottom, of which 29.8% had children under the age of 18 living in them. Of all households, 46.2% were married-couple households, 33.7% were households with a male householder and no spouse or partner present, and 14.4% were households with a female householder and no spouse or partner present. About 29.8% of all households were made up of individuals and 21.1% had someone living alone who was 65 years of age or older.

There were 115 housing units, of which 9.6% were vacant. The homeowner vacancy rate was 0.0% and the rental vacancy rate was 0.0%.

Racial composition as of the 2020 census
Race	Number	Percent
White	158	63.7%
Black or African American	0	0.0%
American Indian and Alaska Native	63	25.4%
Asian	0	0.0%
Native Hawaiian and Other Pacific Islander	0	0.0%
Some other race	1	0.4%
Two or more races	26	10.5%
Hispanic or Latino (of any race)	1	0.4%

=== 2000 census ===
As of the census of 2000, there were 265 people, 100 households, and 82 families residing in the CDP. The population density was 28.7 inhabitants per square mile (11.1/km^{2}). There were 113 housing units at an average density of 12.2/sq mi (4.7/km^{2}). The racial makeup of the CDP was 69.43% White, 1.51% African American, 19.25% Native American, 0.75% from other races, and 9.06% from two or more races. Hispanic or Latino of any race were 1.13% of the population.

There were 100 households, out of which 27.0% had children under the age of 18 living with them, 74.0% were married couples living together, 6.0% had a female householder with no husband present, and 18.0% were non-families. 16.0% of all households were made up of individuals, and 6.0% had someone living alone who was 65 years of age or older. The average household size was 2.65 and the average family size was 2.90.

In the CDP, the population was spread out, with 21.9% under the age of 18, 7.2% from 18 to 24, 29.4% from 25 to 44, 31.3% from 45 to 64, and 10.2% who were 65 years of age or older. The median age was 39 years. For every 100 females, there were 136.6 males. For every 100 females age 18 and over, there were 113.4 males.

The median income for a household in the CDP was $30,250, and the median income for a family was $34,250. Males had a median income of $23,125 versus $19,375 for females. The per capita income for the CDP was $13,486. About 6.9% of families and 7.7% of the population were below the poverty line, including 12.3% of those under the age of eighteen and none of those 65 or over.
