= First Baptist Church (Muskogee, Oklahoma) =

Historic church in Oklahoma, United States

- U.S. National Register of Historic Places
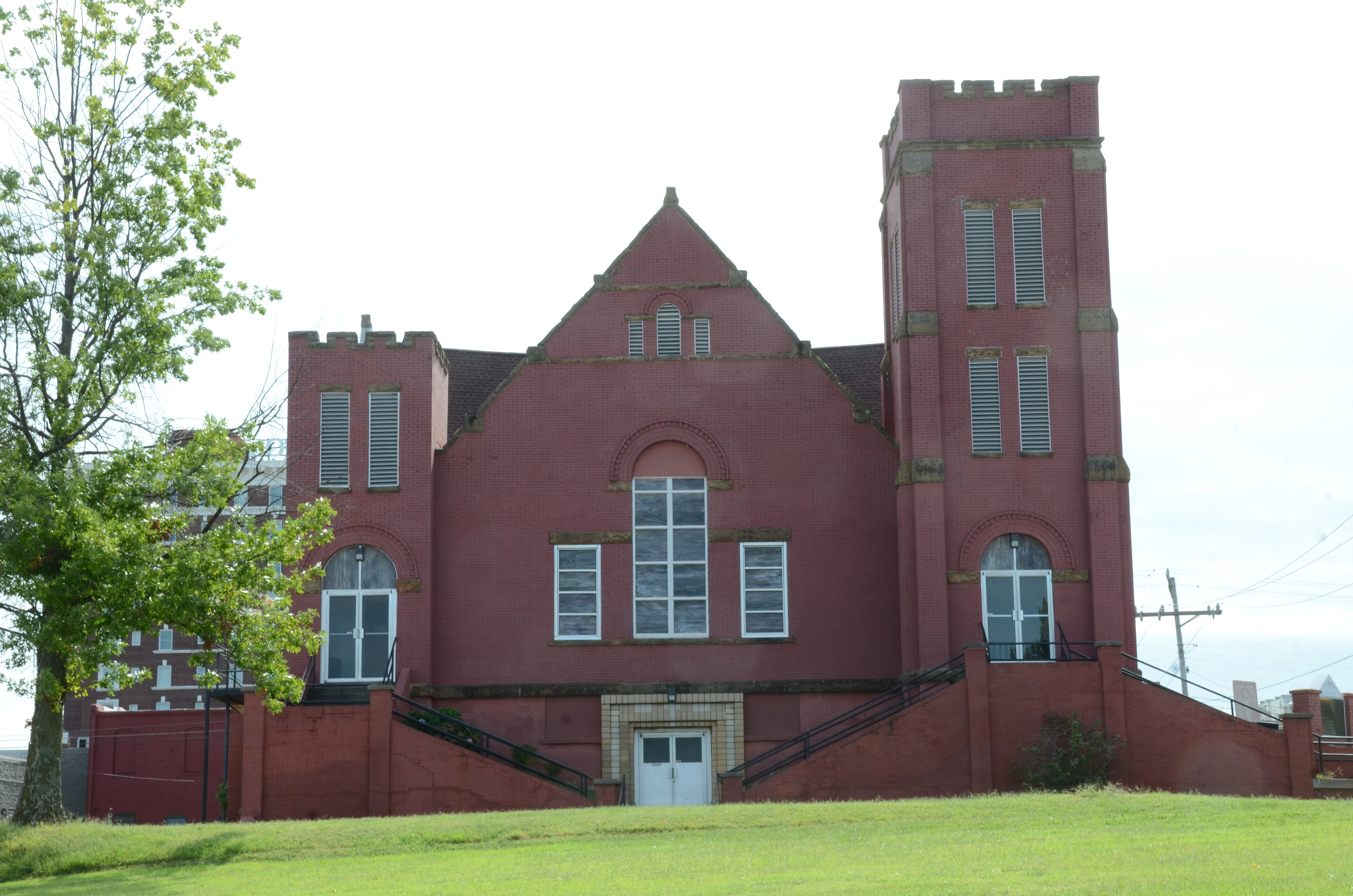

- Location within Oklahoma Location within the United States
- Location: Muskogee, Oklahoma
- Coordinates: 35°45′9.97″N 95°22′26.26″W
- Built: 1903
- MPS: Black Protestant Churches of Muskogee TR
- NRHP reference No.: 84003164
- Added to NRHP: September 25, 1984

The First Baptist Church is a historic church building in Muskogee, Oklahoma. The church was built in 1903 and was the first church building for the African-American population of Muskogee County. It was built in a Romanesque Revival style. It features two asymmetrical, crenelated towers and a steeply pitched gabled roof. The building is clad in two types of red brick. The two types of brick are separated by a rusticated limestone belt course. The building was listed on the National Register of Historic Places in 1984 for architectural significance and for its importance in local African-American history.

First Baptist "evolved from a mission school founded in 1877 for blacks and Indians". It is one of four churches included in the Black Protestant Churches of Muskogee Theme Resource study.

Muskogee had a "thriving" black community with a business district of "several retail stores, physicians and attorneys offices, a black-owned bank, and a black newspaper, the Muskogee Cimeter." The population included 7,831 blacks in 1910 (31% of the total Muskogee population).
