= Sour John, Oklahoma =

- Census-designated place
- Location within Oklahoma Location within the United States
- Coordinates: 35°38′05″N 95°08′26″W
- Country: United States
- State: Oklahoma
- County: Muskogee

Area
  - Total: 5.68 sq mi (14.70 km^{2})
  - Land: 5.68 sq mi (14.70 km^{2})
  - Water: 0 sq mi (0.00 km^{2})
- Elevation: 807 ft (246 m)

Population (2020)
  - Total: 71
  - Density: 12.5/sq mi (4.83/km^{2})
- Time zone: UTC-6 (Central (CST))
  - Summer (DST): UTC-5 (CDT)
- ZIP Code: 74435 (Gore)
- FIPS code: 40-68537
- GNIS feature ID: 2408759

Sour John is a census-designated place (CDP) in Muskogee County, Oklahoma, United States. The population was 71 at the 2020 census.

== Geography ==
Sour John is in eastern Muskogee County, bordered to the northwest by Greenleaf Lake, to the south by Oklahoma State Highway 10, and to the east by Sequoyah and Cherokee counties. State Highway 10 leads north 18 miles (29 km) to Fort Gibson and southeast 7 miles (11 km) to Gore.

According to the U.S. Census Bureau, the Sour John CDP has a total area of 5.7 square miles (15 km^{2}), all land. Greenleaf Lake, along the northwestern edge of the CDP, is a reservoir on Greenleaf Creek, which flows southwest just over 1 mile (1.6 km) to the Arkansas River.

== Demographics ==
Historical population
Census	Pop.	Note	%±
2000	61		—
2010	60		−1.6%
2020	71		18.3%
U.S. Decennial Census

=== 2020 census ===
As of the 2020 census, Sour John had a population of 71. The median age was 31.5 years. 22.5% of residents were under the age of 18 and 15.5% of residents were 65 years of age or older. For every 100 females there were 97.2 males, and for every 100 females age 18 and over there were 103.7 males age 18 and over.

0.0% of residents lived in urban areas, while 100.0% lived in rural areas.

There were 27 households in Sour John, of which 14.8% had children under the age of 18 living in them. Of all households, 81.5% were married-couple households, 7.4% were households with a male householder and no spouse or partner present, and 3.7% were households with a female householder and no spouse or partner present. About 3.7% of all households were made up of individuals and 3.7% had someone living alone who was 65 years of age or older.

There were 34 housing units, of which 20.6% were vacant. The homeowner vacancy rate was 0.0% and the rental vacancy rate was 0.0%.

Racial composition as of the 2020 census
Race	Number	Percent
White	45	63.4%
Black or African American	0	0.0%
American Indian and Alaska Native	13	18.3%
Asian	0	0.0%
Native Hawaiian and Other Pacific Islander	0	0.0%
Some other race	0	0.0%
Two or more races	13	18.3%
Hispanic or Latino (of any race)	0	0.0%

=== 2010 census ===
As of the 2010 census, the population of Sour John was 60.

=== 2000 census ===
As of the census of 2000, there were 61 people, 23 households, and 18 families residing in the CDP. The population density was 10.7 people per square mile (4.1/km^{2}). There were 27 housing units at an average density of 4.7/sq mi (1.8/km^{2}). The racial makeup of the CDP was 67.21% White, 3.28% African American, 22.95% Native American, and 6.56% from two or more races.

There were 23 households, out of which 39.1% had children under the age of 18 living with them, 65.2% were married couples living together, 4.3% had a female householder with no husband present, and 21.7% were non-families. 17.4% of all households were made up of individuals, and 8.7% had someone living alone who was 65 years of age or older. The average household size was 2.65 and the average family size was 3.06.

In the CDP, the population was spread out, with 27.9% under the age of 18, 6.6% from 18 to 24, 27.9% from 25 to 44, 21.3% from 45 to 64, and 16.4% who were 65 years of age or older. The median age was 39 years. For every 100 females, there were 125.9 males. For every 100 females age 18 and over, there were 109.5 males.

The median income for a household in the CDP was $32,500, and the median income for a family was $43,750. Males had a median income of $38,750 versus $11,250 for females. The per capita income for the CDP was $23,772. There were 15.0% of families and 13.4% of the population living below the poverty line, including 10.0% of under eighteens and none of those over 64.
