= Simms, Oklahoma =

- Census-designated place
- Location within Oklahoma Location within the United States
- Coordinates: 35°23′55″N 95°09′53″W
- Country: United States
- State: Oklahoma
- County: Muskogee

Area
  - Total: 14.10 sq mi (36.51 km^{2})
  - Land: 14.10 sq mi (36.51 km^{2})
  - Water: 0 sq mi (0.00 km^{2})
- Elevation: 518 ft (158 m)

Population (2020)
  - Total: 261
  - Density: 18.5/sq mi (7.15/km^{2})
- Time zone: UTC-6 (Central (CST))
  - Summer (DST): UTC-5 (CDT)
- ZIP Codes: 74455 (Porum); 74470 (Webbers Falls)
- FIPS code: 40-67625
- GNIS feature ID: 2408741

Simms is an unincorporated community and census-designated place (CDP) in Muskogee County, Oklahoma, United States. The population was 261 as of the 2020 census, down from 325 in 2010.

== Geography ==
Simms is in southeastern Muskogee County, 8 miles (13 km) northeast of Porum and 10 miles (16 km) south of Webbers Falls. The Canadian River passes less than a mile south of the southern border of the community, 8 miles (13 km) from its mouth at the Arkansas River. Muskogee, the county seat, is 33 miles (53 km) to the north-northwest.

According to the U.S. Census Bureau, the CDP has a total area of 14.1 square miles (37 km^{2}), all land. Elevations in the community range from around 500 feet (150 m) above sea level in the valleys to between 800 and 1,000 feet (240 and 300 m) atop several large hills, including Barker Mountain, Standifird Mountain, Harris Mountain, and Holt Mountain.

== Demographics ==
Historical population
Census	Pop.	Note	%±
2000	295		—
2010	325		10.2%
2020	261		−19.7%
U.S. Decennial Census

=== 2020 census ===
As of the 2020 census, Simms had a population of 261. The median age was 51.5 years. 22.2% of residents were under the age of 18 and 26.1% of residents were 65 years of age or older. For every 100 females there were 74.0 males, and for every 100 females age 18 and over there were 72.0 males age 18 and over.

0.0% of residents lived in urban areas, while 100.0% lived in rural areas.

There were 111 households in Simms, of which 19.8% had children under the age of 18 living in them. Of all households, 65.8% were married-couple households, 25.2% were households with a male householder and no spouse or partner present, and 9.0% were households with a female householder and no spouse or partner present. About 27.0% of all households were made up of individuals and 10.8% had someone living alone who was 65 years of age or older.

There were 113 housing units, of which 1.8% were vacant. The homeowner vacancy rate was 0.0% and the rental vacancy rate was 0.0%.

Racial composition as of the 2020 census
Race	Number	Percent
White	150	57.5%
Black or African American	1	0.4%
American Indian and Alaska Native	72	27.6%
Asian	2	0.8%
Native Hawaiian and Other Pacific Islander	2	0.8%
Some other race	5	1.9%
Two or more races	29	11.1%
Hispanic or Latino (of any race)	5	1.9%

=== 2000 census ===
As of the census of 2000, there were 295 people, 105 households, and 87 families residing in the CDP. The population density was 20.9 people per square mile (8.1/km^{2}). There were 110 housing units at an average density of 7.8/sq mi (3.0/km^{2}). The racial makeup of the CDP was 55.93% White, 33.56% Native American, 0.34% Asian, 0.68% from other races, and 9.49% from two or more races. Hispanic or Latino of any race were 1.69% of the population.

There were 105 households, out of which 41.0% had children under the age of 18 living with them, 68.6% were married couples living together, 10.5% had a female householder with no husband present, and 16.2% were non-families. 11.4% of all households were made up of individuals, and 4.8% had someone living alone who was 65 years of age or older. The average household size was 2.81 and the average family size was 3.08.

In the CDP, the population was spread out, with 29.5% under the age of 18, 10.2% from 18 to 24, 24.7% from 25 to 44, 25.4% from 45 to 64, and 10.2% who were 65 years of age or older. The median age was 36 years. For every 100 females, there were 100.7 males. For every 100 females age 18 and over, there were 100.0 males.

The median income for a household in the CDP was $20,804, and the median income for a family was $21,696. Males had a median income of $26,500 versus $13,750 for females. The per capita income for the CDP was $8,529. About 19.5% of families and 21.6% of the population were below the poverty line, including 22.8% of those under the age of eighteen and 22.2% of those 65 or over.
