= Warner, Oklahoma =

Town in Muskogee County, Oklahoma, United States

- Town
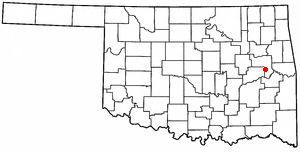
- Location in Oklahoma
- Coordinates: 35°29′26″N 95°18′31″W
- Country: United States
- State: Oklahoma
- County: Muskogee

Area
  - Total: 1.89 sq mi (4.90 km^{2})
  - Land: 1.85 sq mi (4.79 km^{2})
  - Water: 0.042 sq mi (0.11 km^{2})
- Elevation: 561 ft (171 m)

Population (2020)
  - Total: 1,593
  - Density: 861.1/sq mi (332.49/km^{2})
- Time zone: UTC-6 (Central (CST))
  - Summer (DST): UTC-5 (CDT)
- ZIP Code: 74469
- Area codes: 539/918
- FIPS code: 40-78400
- GNIS feature ID: 2413450

Warner is a town in Muskogee County, Oklahoma, United States. The population was 1,593 at the 2020 census. The town is home to one of the two Connors State College campuses.

== History ==
The present town of Warner was formed from two communities, Bennett and Hereford, that had existed in the southern part of the Cherokee Nation's Canadian District. Bennett, about 3 miles (5 km) southeast of Warner, had a post office between 1895 and 1904. (Note: Bennett had disappeared by 2001, except for its cemetery, which is still in use and maintained by the Warner Cemeteries Association.) Hereford was located on the site of present-day Warner. It was established in 1903 and renamed Warner in 1905. (Note: Hereford was named for the breed of cattle owned by a local rancher and developer, Campbell Russell.)

The Muskogee Southern Railroad (quickly acquired by the Midland Valley Railroad) was built through town in the 1902-1903 timeframe. The town briefly became a connection point when it got another rail line to Webbers Falls in 1911, this one courtesy of the Webbers Falls, Shawnee and Western Railroad. But that railway ceased operations in 1914, was reorganized as the Webbers Falls Railroad in 1916, and was dismantled by 1918.

Connors State Agricultural College was founded in Warner in 1908. A second campus in Muskogee was added later. The school was renamed Connors State College in 2001. It is now the town's largest employer.

== Geography ==
Warner is 20 miles (32 km) south of Muskogee on U.S. Highway 64. Interstate 40 passes through the southern side of town, leading east 53 miles (85 km) to Fort Smith, Arkansas, and west 128 miles (206 km) to Oklahoma City.

According to the U.S. Census Bureau, the town of Warner has a total area of 1.9 square miles (4.9 km^{2}), of which 0.04 square miles (0.10 km^{2}), or 2.27%, are water. The town drains in all directions to tributaries of Dirty Creek, an east-flowing tributary of the Arkansas River.

== Demographics ==
Historical population
Census	Pop.	Note	%±
1920	318		—
1930	316		−0.6%
1940	391		23.7%
1950	382		−2.3%
1960	881		130.6%
1970	1,217		38.1%
1980	1,310		7.6%
1990	1,479		12.9%
2000	1,430		−3.3%
2010	1,641		14.8%
2020	1,593		−2.9%
U.S. Decennial Census

=== 2020 census ===
As of the 2020 census, Warner had a population of 1,593. The median age was 32.6 years. 17.9% of residents were under the age of 18 and 17.2% of residents were 65 years of age or older. For every 100 females there were 84.4 males, and for every 100 females age 18 and over there were 83.7 males age 18 and over.

0.0% of residents lived in urban areas, while 100.0% lived in rural areas.

There were 496 households in Warner, of which 30.8% had children under the age of 18 living in them. Of all households, 45.0% were married-couple households, 20.6% were households with a male householder and no spouse or partner present, and 29.2% were households with a female householder and no spouse or partner present. About 29.6% of all households were made up of individuals and 13.7% had someone living alone who was 65 years of age or older.

There were 560 housing units, of which 11.4% were vacant. The homeowner vacancy rate was 2.2% and the rental vacancy rate was 14.2%.

Racial composition as of the 2020 census
Race	Number	Percent
White	980	61.5%
Black or African American	75	4.7%
American Indian and Alaska Native	325	20.4%
Asian	0	0.0%
Native Hawaiian and Other Pacific Islander	0	0.0%
Some other race	7	0.4%
Two or more races	206	12.9%
Hispanic or Latino (of any race)	52	3.3%

=== 2000 census ===
As of the census of 2000, there were 1,430 people, 509 households, and 344 families residing in the town. The population density was 1,128.1 inhabitants per square mile (435.6/km^{2}). There were 636 housing units at an average density of 501.7 per square mile (193.7/km^{2}). The racial makeup of the town was 65.31% White, 3.99% African American, 24.06% Native American, 0.77% from other races, and 5.87% from two or more races. Hispanic or Latino of any race were 2.38% of the population.

There were 509 households, out of which 31.2% had children under the age of 18 living with them, 52.5% were married couples living together, 12.6% had a female householder with no husband present, and 32.4% were non-families. 27.1% of all households were made up of individuals, and 11.0% had someone living alone who was 65 years of age or older. The average household size was 2.45 and the average family size was 2.99.

In the town, the population was spread out, with 23.0% under the age of 18, 24.8% from 18 to 24, 22.2% from 25 to 44, 17.4% from 45 to 64, and 12.6% who were 65 years of age or older. The median age was 27 years. For every 100 females, there were 96.4 males. For every 100 females age 18 and over, there were 91.5 males.

The median income for a household in the town was $22,500, and the median income for a family was $27,596. Males had a median income of $24,479 versus $14,960 for females. The per capita income for the town was $10,696. About 20.0% of families and 25.3% of the population were below the poverty line, including 42.1% of those under age 18 and 19.2% of those age 65 or over.

== See also ==
- List of municipalities in Oklahoma
