= Jake Simmons =

African-American oilman (1901–1981)

Jake Simmons Jr.
- Born: January 17, 1901; Haskell, Oklahoma
- Died: March 24, 1981 (aged 80); Tulsa, Oklahoma
- Occupation: oilman

Joseph Jacob Simmons Jr. (January 17, 1901 – March 24, 1981) was a prominent African-American oilman. He "rose above humble beginnings to become the most successful and most recognizable black entrepreneur in the history of the petroleum industry." As an internationally known oil broker he partnered with Phillips Petroleum Company and Signal Oil and Gas to open up African oil fields in Liberia, Nigeria and Ghana. In 1969, he became the first black person to be appointed to the National Petroleum Council.

== Early life ==
Born in what later became Haskell, Oklahoma, Simmons was the ninth of ten children. His great-grandfather had been a slave of the Creek Indian tribe, and later became a chief as well as a leader for many of the freed Creek slaves. Simmons' father owned a 500-acre (2.0 km^{2}) ranch in the Haskell area. As a child, Simmons repaired fences and worked cattle. At the age of 10, he told his father, "I want to be an oil man."

Booker T. Washington, on one of his trips to Oklahoma, spent the night at the Simmons ranch and convinced Simmons to attend the Tuskegee Institute in Alabama. From Washington, Simmons learned to love work for its own sake, and learned that success depends on an ability to charm and motivate people.

After graduating from Tuskegee in 1919, Simmons married Melba Dorsey and moved to Detroit, Michigan. A year later he divorced her, moved back to Oklahoma, and married Willie Eva Flowers.

== Oil business ==
As a member of the Creek Nation, Simmons received 160 acres of land when the tribe disbanded. In the 1920s, oil flowed on his hand. He became an oil broker and entrepreneur, buying and selling oil leases, and started a real estate business. During the Great Depression, he sold Oklahoma farmland to African Americans in East Texas, who had made money in the oil boom. Meanwhile, he expanded his oil lease-trading business into Texas, Louisiana, Arkansas and Kansas. He dealt with oil barons such as William Skelly, founder of Skelly Oil, and Frank Phillips, founder of Phillips Petroleum.

With the help of his sons and L. W. Thomas of Summit, Oklahoma, Simmons built the Simmons Royalty Co., and expanded into cattle and insurance.

In the 1960s, Simmons worked as an intermediary in multimillion-dollar deals between major American oil companies and newly independent African nations. He became internationally recognized in the oil business. In 1969, he was appointed to the National Petroleum Council.

== Civil rights ==
Simmons refused to be a victim of bigotry. He told his children, "You are equal to anyone, but if you think you're not, you're not."

Simmons thought that jobs were the key to economic empowerment for African Americans. He helped blacks gain skills in his business and then helped them find jobs in other businesses. Simmons once said, "It is a waste of life for a man to fail to achieve when he has the opportunity."

In 1938, Simmons filed one of the early court cases against separate schools and took it all the way to the Supreme Court. He was president of the Oklahoma NAACP and presided over the National Negro Business League.

== Family ==
Simmons' son J. J. "Jake" III was vice president of the family business before being recruited to work at the Interior Department during the Kennedy administration. He served as undersecretary of the Interior Department during the first Reagan administration and a member of the Interstate Commerce Commission in the 1980s and 1990s. Donald, an economist, took over Simmons Royalty Company. Blanche was a social worker and Kenneth, a Harvard-educated professor of architecture at the University of California, Berkeley.
