= A. W. Patterson House =

Historic house in Oklahoma, United States

- U.S. National Register of Historic Places
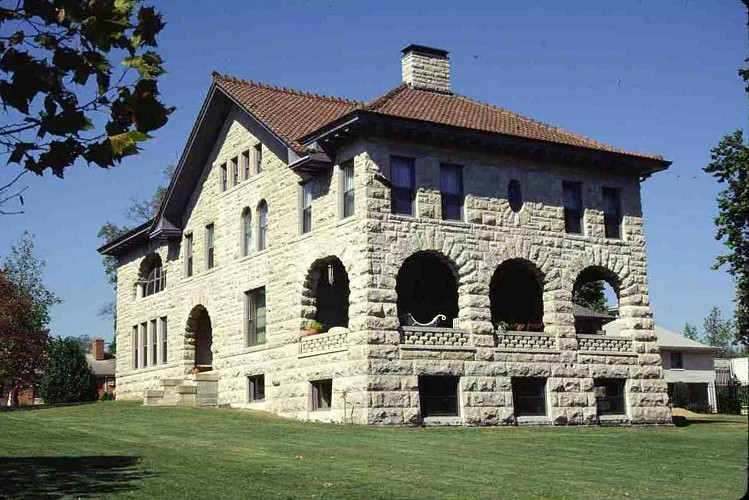
- A. W. Patterson House

- Location within Oklahoma Location within the United States
- Location: 1320 W. Okmulgee St., Muskogee, Oklahoma
- Coordinates: 35°45′12″N 95°23′4″W
- Built: 190
- Architect: McKibban & McKibban
- Architectural style: Richardson Romanesque
- MPS: Territorial Homes of Muskogee TR
- NRHP reference No.: 84003322
- Added to NRHP: May 02, 1984

The A. W. Patterson House is a historic house in Muskogee, Oklahoma. Located at the intersection of 14th Street and West Okmulgee, it is situated at the crest of a hill near the western edge of the downtown Muskogee neighborhood. It was built in 1906, before Oklahoma achieved statehood in 1907. It was listed on the National Register of Historic Places in 1984.

It includes Richardsonian Romanesque features: massive quality of the limestone rock wall finish, "cavernous door and porch openings, and occasional band of straight-topped windows", and several Richardsonian-type arches with voussoirs.

== NRHP application discussion ==
This was one of five historic residences in a group that was nominated on the same application, which was titled, "Territorial Homes of Muskogee." The houses in this group include:

- A. C. Trumbo House,
- J. C. Welch House,
- A. W. Patterson Home,
- Coss Home, and
- Murphy Home.

All of these houses were built in the same time period (1904-1907), shortly before the end of the Indian Territorial Period. They are all in good condition and continue in service as residences. There have been no alterations significant enough to disturb their historic character.

The thematic nomination of Territorial Homes of Muskogee is significant because: (1) their historic association with five businessmen and community leaders in Muskogee during the latter stages of-the Indian Territory era and the first decade of Oklahoma statehood, and (2) although the homes were constructed within the same general time frame (1904-1907), and within the same neighborhood (1300-1400 blocks of West Okmulgee and West Broadway), each has unique and individual qualities expressed in their design, decorative elements, and construction materials. they are some of the best examples of high style architecture in northeastern Oklahoma which have retained their original character and fabric.

== Description ==
The home was designed by McKibban & McKibban, an architectural firm which designed many of Muskogee's early commercial buildings. It is three stories high, with rooms on the two lower floors. The third floor was an attic, but is now used for storing boxes. House dimensions are about 55 feet (17 m) by 85 feet (26 m). Total area is about 10,000 sq ft (930 m^{2}). The exterior is finished with limestone laid in coursed ashlar fashion. The limestone was quarried in Missouri, and masons to install it also came from there. The roof is gently pitched|several Richardsonian Romanesque qualities including a limestone rock coursed ashlar wall finish, a round arched entryway and round arched window surrounds, and the low-pitched red clay tile-covered hip roof with cross gables in front. The heavy stone arches utilized limestone quarried from Carthage, Missouri. It was built with four covered porches, including the main south entry, the north side entry from the detached garage, and two interior covered porches, one which spreads the entire width of the home on the east side, overlooking downtown Muskogee to the east. There is also a covered porch on the second floor of the south side. The open, covered porch on the east side of the home had its own source of water supply and was large enough to accommodate a full-sized hammock, surrounded by five half-moon arched open window areas.

The large foyer inside the main entry door on the south side has dual sidelight clear lead-glass windows with beveled panes behind carved stone benches which straddle the front porch. This porch, with nearly a dozen steps up to the front door is the scene of many historical family photos and group photos for civic and social organizations within the city.

The house has a full walkout basement with several separate rooms. A detached garage, about 25 feet (7.6 m) by 45 feet (14 m) is about 10 feet (3.0 m) from the northeast corner of the house.

== Ownership history ==
=== Original owner ===
The Patterson home was the home of two prominent Muskogee businessmen. A. W. Patterson was co-founder of the Bank of Muskogee in 1901 which later was renamed the Muskogee National Bank and he served as its president until 1918. (Note: The other co-founder was his son-in-law, A. C. Trumbo.) Patterson was the driving force in promoting the Arkansas River as a navigable body of water and was the instrumental figure in the construction of Muskogee's Convention Hall which was the site of the Trans-Mississippi Commercial Congress held in 1907. Patterson lived in the home until his death in 1916. His widow remained there until she died in 1934.

=== Second owner ===
In 1941, the home was purchased from the Pattersons' daughters by L. R. Kershaw, one of Muskogee's community leaders. Kershaw was active in local politics, was an experienced lawyer, banker, farmer, rancher and court-appointed receiver for over a dozen National Banks before and during the Great Depression. One of the banks which he served as the receiver for, as an appointee by the Comptroller of the Currency, was the merged Muskogee National Bank and the Security National Bank of Muskogee. He was one of the original founders of the Eastern Oklahoma Electric Traction Company, and gained national notability as a breeder of registered Aberdeen-Angus cattle during the 1920s, 1930s and 1940s and he also developed numerous residential subdivisions in the city. The home remained in the Kershaw family until 1973, or four years after the death of L. R. Kershaw.

When Dr. Phil Couch visited Muskogee in 1978 to see whether he wanted to establish a practice in the city. He happened to drive by the Patterson House and quickly fell in love with it, but learned it was not for sale. The third owners, Sam and Mary Lou Caldwell, were still living there. Disappointed, the Couches still agreed that Phil should open a practice in Muskogee. After they moved to the city in 1979, they learned that the Patterson home would be on the market soon. So, they rented an apartment, and bought the house as soon as it became available in 1979.

The home was listed on the National Register of Historic Places, by the National Park Service, in 1984 as property #84003322.

The Couches admit that the house needed some major upgrades serve their own needs. This included:

- replacing all plumbing and wiring;
- adding heating and air conditioning for the basement and all of the three stories;
- adding insulation to the house (there was none initially)

They are happy with the result.

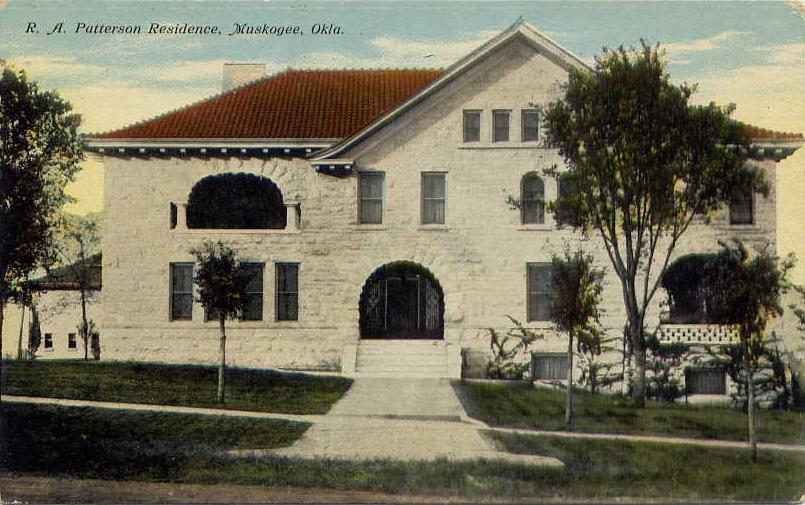
