= W.E.B. DuBois School =

- U.S. National Register of Historic Places
- Location within Oklahoma
- Location: Off U.S. Route 69, Summit, Oklahoma
- Coordinates: 35°40′05″N 95°25′24″W
- Area: less than one acre
- Built: 1925
- MPS: Educational Resources of All-Black Towns in Oklahoma TR
- NRHP reference No.: 84003161
- Added to NRHP: September 28, 1984

The W.E.B. DuBois School, located off U.S. Route 69 in Summit, Oklahoma, was built in 1925. It was listed on the National Register of Historic Places in 1984.

It is about 85 by 85 feet (26 m × 26 m) in plan. The exterior of its original portion is finished with random coursed native stone. A 1941 addition is faced with red brick, and a 1950s addition is built of concrete block. Its front, south facade has a round-arched entryway.
