= Dirty Creek (Arkansas) =

Stream in Johnson County, Arkansas, U.S.

Coordinates: 35°29′03″N 93°38′09″W

Dirty Creek is a stream in Johnson County, Arkansas, in the United States. It is a tributary of Horsehead Creek.

"Dirty" is a corruption of Dardenne or Derden, the name of a French family of pioneer settlers.

== See also ==
- List of rivers of Arkansas
