= St. Thomas Primitive Baptist Church =

Historic church in Oklahoma, United States

- U.S. National Register of Historic Places
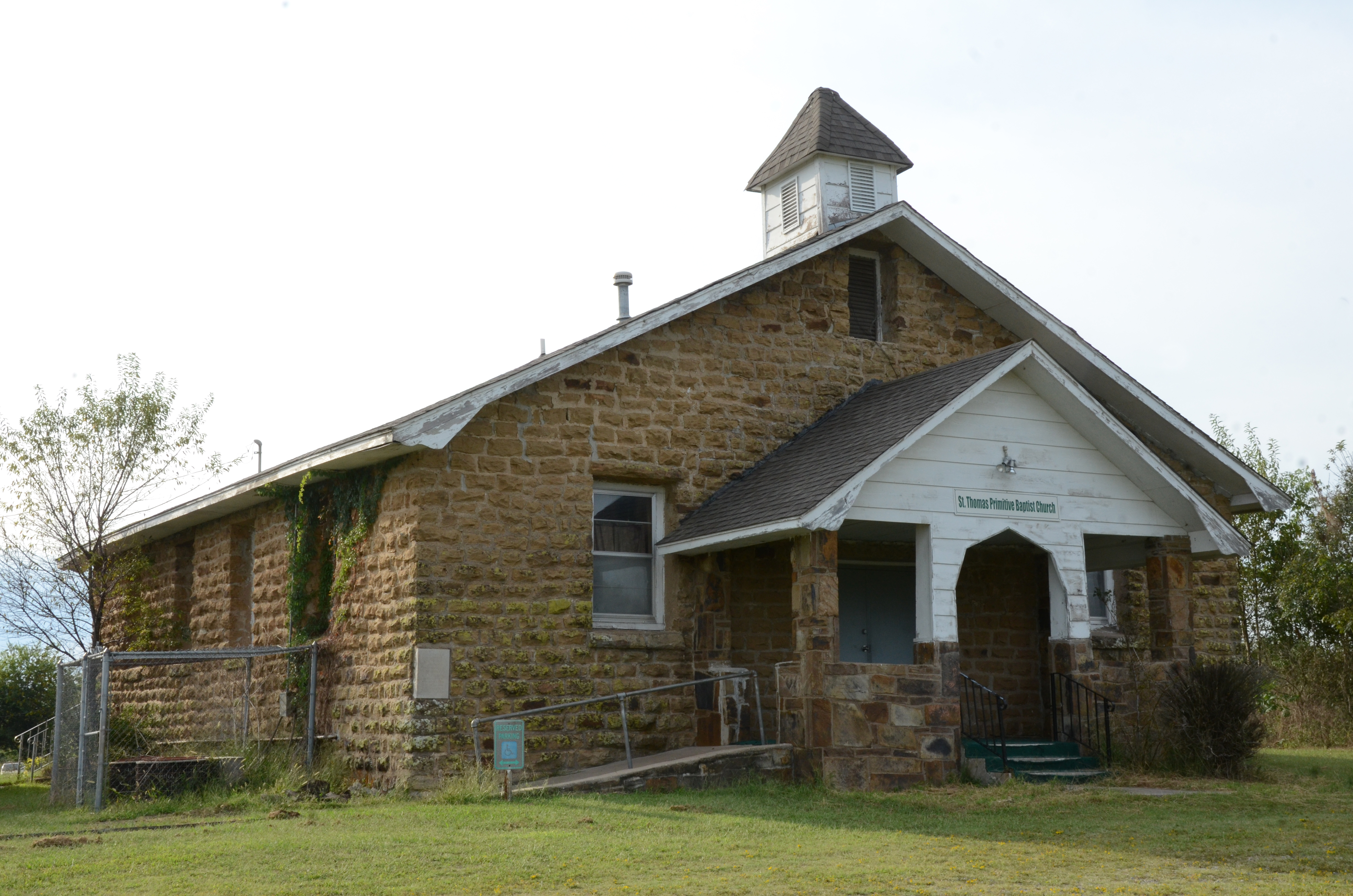

- Location within Oklahoma Location within the United States
- Location: Summit, Oklahoma
- Coordinates: 35°40′8.77″N 95°25′27.61″W
- Built: 1930
- Architect: Rev. L.W. Thomas,
- NRHP reference No.: 04000123
- Added to NRHP: March 3, 2004

St. Thomas Primitive Baptist Church is a historic church building in Summit, Oklahoma. The church was built in 1922 for the Primitive Baptist congregation and is the oldest surviving structure in Summit, a historically all-black town. It was built by Rev. L. W. Thomas. The building is a front-gabled, sandstone building with a square cupola on the ridge of the east end, over the entrance. It was listed on the National Register of Historic Places in 2004 for its importance to the historical settlement and the social history of the black community in Oklahoma.
