= Summit, Oklahoma =

- Town
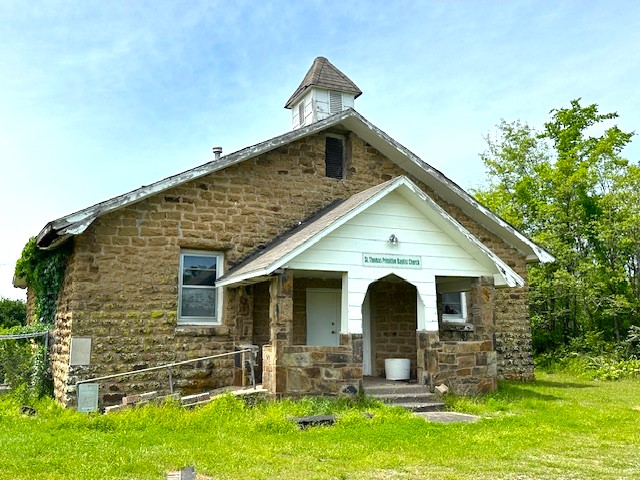
- A church in Summit, May 2025

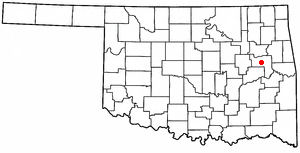
- Location in Oklahoma
- Coordinates: 35°40′10″N 95°25′14″W
- Country: United States
- State: Oklahoma
- County: Muskogee

Area
  - Total: 0.98 sq mi (2.53 km^{2})
  - Land: 0.98 sq mi (2.53 km^{2})
  - Water: 0 sq mi (0.00 km^{2})
- Elevation: 617 ft (188 m)

Population (2020)
  - Total: 108
  - Density: 110.7/sq mi (42.73/km^{2})
- Time zone: UTC-6 (Central (CST))
  - Summer (DST): UTC-5 (CDT)
- ZIP Code: 74401
- FIPS code: 40-71450
- GNIS feature ID: 2413349

Summit is a town in Muskogee County, Oklahoma, United States. It was originally called "South Muskogee" when it was platted in 1910, and is one of 13 all-black towns still surviving at the beginning of the 21st century. The population was 108 at the time of the 2020 Census, down from 139 in 2010. The community had a post office as early as 1896. Like many of the other Black towns previously mentioned, Summit was a stopover destination on the Missouri, Kansas and Texas Railway and had a depot in the community. It is said that the town may have been named Summit because it was the highest point on the railroad between the Arkansas and the North Canadian rivers.

== Geography ==
Summit is in central Muskogee County 6 miles (10 km) southwest of Muskogee, the county seat. According to the U.S. Census Bureau, the town has a total area of 0.98 square miles (2.54 km^{2}), all land.

Summit, situated 617 feet (188 m) above sea level, is located at 35.40° N latitude and 95.25° W longitude, within the eastern part of Oklahoma, less than 10 miles (16 km) southwest of the Arkansas River. The surroundings are mostly flat to gentle, rolling landscapes typical of the Great Plains, with fairly rich soil for good farming. While there are no significant bodies of water around this town, its proximity to the Arkansas River and its tributaries influences the regional ecology and hydrology. Summit's climate is humid subtropical. Hot summers and mild winters are the usual pattern throughout most of Oklahoma.

== Demographics ==
Historical population
Census	Pop.	Note	%±
1990	170		—
2000	226		32.9%
2010	139		−38.5%
2020	108		−22.3%
U.S. Decennial Census

=== Racial and ethnic composition ===
Summit town, Oklahoma – Racial and ethnic composition Note: the US Census treats Hispanic/Latino as an ethnic category. This table excludes Latinos from the racial categories and assigns them to a separate category. Hispanics/Latinos may be of any race.
Race / Ethnicity (NH = Non-Hispanic)	Pop 2000	Pop 2010	Pop 2020	% 2000	% 2010	% 2020
White alone (NH)	13	24	16	5.75%	17.27%	14.81%
Black or African American alone (NH)	190	105	69	84.07%	75.54%	63.89%
Native American or Alaska Native alone (NH)	3	7	11	1.33%	5.04%	10.19%
Asian alone (NH)	8	0	0	3.54%	0.00%	0.00%
Native Hawaiian or Pacific Islander alone (NH)	1	0	0	0.44%	0.00%	0.00%
Other race alone (NH)	0	0	0	0.00%	0.00%	0.00%
Mixed race or Multiracial (NH)	7	3	8	3.10%	2.16%	7.41%
Hispanic or Latino (any race)	4	0	4	1.77%	0.00%	3.70%
Total	226	139	108	100.00%	100.00%	100.00%

=== 2020 census ===
As of the 2020 census, Summit had a population of 108. The median age was 54.7 years. 23.1% of residents were under the age of 18 and 22.2% of residents were 65 years of age or older. For every 100 females there were 96.4 males, and for every 100 females age 18 and over there were 93.0 males age 18 and over.

0.0% of residents lived in urban areas, while 100.0% lived in rural areas.

There were 46 households in Summit, of which 37.0% had children under the age of 18 living in them. Of all households, 43.5% were married-couple households, 19.6% were households with a male householder and no spouse or partner present, and 30.4% were households with a female householder and no spouse or partner present. About 19.6% of all households were made up of individuals and 6.5% had someone living alone who was 65 years of age or older.

There were 49 housing units, of which 6.1% were vacant. The homeowner vacancy rate was 0.0% and the rental vacancy rate was 0.0%.

=== 2000 census ===
As of the census of 2000, there were 226 people, 66 households, and 54 families residing in the town. The population density was 247.8 inhabitants per square mile (95.7/km^{2}). There were 73 housing units at an average density of 80.0 per square mile (30.9/km^{2}). The racial makeup of the town was 84.07% African American, 5.75% White, 3.98% Asian, 1.33% Native American, 0.44% Pacific Islander, and 4.42% from two or more races. Hispanic or Latino of any race were 1.77% of the population.

There were 66 households, out of which 42.4% had children under the age of 18 living with them, 59.1% were married couples living together, 18.2% had a female householder with no husband present, and 16.7% were non-families. 15.2% of all households were made up of individuals, and 10.6% had someone living alone who was 65 years of age or older. The average household size was 3.42 and the average family size was 3.60.

In the town, the population was spread out, with 42.0% under the age of 18, 11.9% from 18 to 24, 18.1% from 25 to 44, 16.4% from 45 to 64, and 11.5% who were 65 years of age or older. The median age was 22 years. For every 100 females, there were 76.6 males. For every 100 females age 18 and over, there were 74.7 males.

The median income for a household in the town was $17,917, and the median income for a family was $15,625. Males had a median income of $16,563 versus $11,875 for females. The per capita income for the town was $6,390. About 34.5% of families and 47.5% of the population were below the poverty line, including 65.2% of those under the age of eighteen and 10.0% of those 65 or over.

Of persons 25 years of age and above in Summit, an approximate 59.7% have at least a high school diploma and at least 1.5% hold a bachelor's degree. Residents five years of age and above, 2.1% speak non-English languages at home and 1.0% of them speak Spanish. With 23.3% of the non-military workers occupied in government activities, the unemployment rate remains at 23.1%. With 90.3% of the units owned and 9.7% rented, Summit's housing is essentially owner-occupied.

== Business ==
On November 20, 2025, Google announced a new data center to be built near Summit on hundreds of acres of land, as part of an investment of $9 billion spread across several Oklahoma sites.

== Historic sites ==
NRHP-listed sites in Summit include:

- W.E.B. DuBois School
- St. Thomas Primitive Baptist Church
- Reverend L.W. Thomas Homestead

== See also ==
- Boley, Brooksville, Clearview, Grayson, Langston, Lima, Redbird, Rentiesville, Taft, Tatums, Tullahassee, and Vernon, other "All-Black" settlements that were part of the Land Run of 1889.
