= Dirty Creek (Oklahoma) =

Stream in Muskogee and McIntosh County, Oklahoma, U.S.

- Mouth of Dirty Creek

Location
- Country: United States
- State: Oklahoma
- Counties: Muskogee, McIntosh

Physical characteristics
- Source: Near Oktaha, Muskogee County
  - location: Oklahoma
  - coordinates: 35.4595405°N 95.0860692°W
- Mouth: Arkansas River
  - location: Near Webbers Falls, Oklahoma
  - coordinates: 35.5098°N 95.1234°W
  - elevation: 459 ft (140 m)
- Length: 49.7 m (163 ft)
- Basin size: Part of Arkansas River watershed

Basin features
- Tributaries
  - left: Elk Creek, Butler Creek
  - right: South Fork Dirty Creek, Georges Fork
- GNIS ID: 1092094

Dirty Creek is a stream located in Muskogee County and McIntosh County, Oklahoma, in the United States. The creek flows approximately 49.7 miles before joining the Arkansas River, ultimately draining into the Gulf of Mexico.

== Etymology ==
The name "Dirty Creek" is a corruption of the Muscogee phrase Terre D'Inde, meaning "land of the turkey". This reflects the historical presence of Muscogee people in the region.

== Geography ==
Dirty Creek lies within the Arkoma Basin and is part of the Arkansas River watershed. Its elevation near the mouth is approximately 459 feet (140 m). Nearby communities include Webbers Falls, Carlisle, and Gore. Tributaries of Dirty Creek include Elk Creek, South Fork Dirty Creek, Butler Creek, and Georges Fork.

== History ==
During the American Civil War, the area around Dirty Creek was significant for the Battle of Honey Springs, fought in July 1863. Confederate troops camped near Honey Springs on the south side of Elk Creek (locally associated with Dirty Creek), while the main battle occurred north of the creek in present-day Muskogee County.

In the 19th century, Dirty Creek was also the site of the Drew Salt Works, later operated by Dave Vann during the Civil War. These works produced large quantities of salt for regional trade, using mule-powered pumps and extensive evaporation kettles.

== Environmental significance ==
Dirty Creek and its tributary Elk Creek were listed as impaired waters under the Clean Water Act in 2006 due to turbidity caused by sediment runoff from grazing and cropland. Best management practices implemented between 2004 and 2007 reduced erosion and improved water quality, leading to their proposed removal from the impaired list in 2010.

Additionally, the Dirty Creek Conservation Bank provides habitat offsets for the endangered American burying beetle within the USFWS Tulsa District, highlighting its role in species conservation.

== Recreation ==
The creek and surrounding areas support activities such as fishing, canoeing, and wildlife observation. Nearby landmarks include Red Hill Cemetery and historic Webbers Falls.

== See also ==
- List of rivers of Oklahoma
- Battle of Honey Springs
