= Haskell Public Schools =

School district in Oklahoma

Haskell Public Schools is a K-12 public school system headquartered in Haskell, Oklahoma, a small town in Muskogee County. The elementary school is in a separate building from the middle school and high school. The elementary is named Mary White Elementary after a former superintendent's wife. The middle school is named E.W. Beavers Middle School after a former principal/superintendent. The high school is simply called Haskell High School. The football stadium is named A.B. Shockley Stadium after a former head football coach/principal/superintendent. The basketball gym is named Franklin Event Center after current longtime teacher at Haskell, Sylvester Franklin. The baseball field is named Goddard Field after an influential member of the town.

== Haskell High School ==
Haskell High School had about 194 students as of 2025 with slightly more than half documented as white, about 28 percent Native American, nine percent hispanic, six percent mixed, and about four percent black. The school is at 900 North Ohio Avenue. Haymakers are the mascot and royal blue and white are the school colors.

=== Sports ===
Two pro drafted athletes have graduated from Haskell Public Schools. LeShon Johnson, a 1990 graduate, is a former running back from the football team who attended Northern Illinois and was drafted in the 3rd round of the 1994 NFL draft by the Green Bay Packers.

Tyler Johnson, a 2004 graduate and Leshon's cousin, was taken straight out of high school in the 12th round of the 2004 MLB draft by the Los Angeles Angels. After spending several years in the minor league, Tyler enrolled at the Oklahoma State University where he played linebacker.

Also, Rick Ferguson was drafted out of high school by the Montreal Expos Major League Baseball club in 1972.
