= V. R. Coss House =

Historic house in Oklahoma, United States

- U.S. National Register of Historic Places
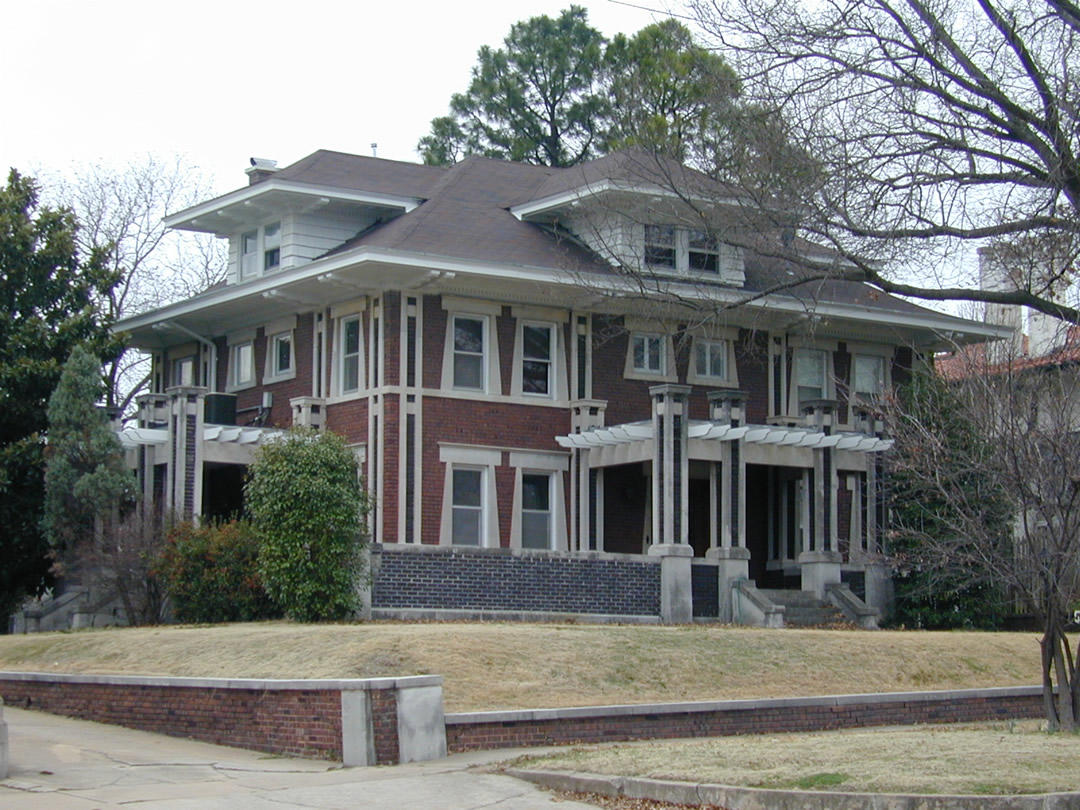
- V. R. Coss Home, 1998

- Location within Oklahoma Location within the United States
- Location: 1315 W. Okmulgee St., Muskogee, Oklahoma
- Coordinates: 35°45′10.85″N 95°23′3.71″W
- Area: less than one acre
- Built: 1906
- Architectural style: Oriental
- MPS: Territorial Homes of Muskogee TR
- NRHP reference No.: 84003159
- Added to NRHP: May 2, 1984

The V. R. Coss House is a historic house in Muskogee, Oklahoma. It was listed on the National Register of Historic Places in 1984.

It is a two-and-a-half-story house, about 50 by 75 feet (15 m × 23 m) in plan, and has a red tile roof. Its walls are brick, laid in running bond.

It was built in 1906 by Virgil R. Coss, an early banker and real estate dealer in Muskogee. The house consists of 3 stories with a partial basement. The first level is predominantly made of quarter-sawn oak while the second level is made of maple. The home has the original stairway as well as a smaller servant stairway which had initiated at the butler's pantry. The butler's pantry was recently combined with the original kitchen to make a larger modern kitchen. The original dining room was fashioned after a railway dining car, so done because of Mr. Coss's close friendship with George Pullman.
