= National Register of Historic Places listings in Muskogee County, Oklahoma =

Location of Muskogee County in Oklahoma

This is a list of the National Register of Historic Places listings in Muskogee County, Oklahoma.

This is intended to be a complete list of the properties and districts on the National Register of Historic Places in Muskogee County, Oklahoma, United States. The locations of National Register properties and districts for which the latitude and longitude coordinates are included below, may be seen in a map.

There are 54 properties and districts listed on the National Register in the county, including 2 National Historic Landmarks.

This National Park Service list is complete through NPS recent listings posted July 4, 2026.

== Current listings ==
	Name on the Register	Image	Date listed	Location	City or town	Description
1	Administration Building-Post Hospital	Administration Building-Post Hospital	November 14, 1985 (#85002828)	803 Garrison Ave. 35°48′24″N 95°15′11″W	Fort Gibson	
2	Bacone College Historic District	Bacone College Historic District	December 10, 2014 (#14001027)	Old Bacone Rd. 35°46′37″N 95°20′05″W	Muskogee	
3	Beth Israel Temple		February 27, 2014 (#14000051)	320 S. Ninth St. 35°44′55″N 95°22′51″W	Muskogee	Currently named Sovereign Grace Baptist Church.
4	Central Baptist Church	Central Baptist Church	September 25, 1984 (#84003157)	515 N. 4th St. 35°45′12″N 95°22′12″W	Muskogee	Demolished in Summer 1985 for Arrowhead Mall
5	Cherokee National Cemetery	Cherokee National Cemetery	March 19, 1979 (#79002002)	1.5 miles (2.4 km) east of Fort Gibson; 35°47′49″N 95°13′45″W	Fort Gibson	
6	Commandant's Quarters	Commandant's Quarters	November 14, 1985 (#85002830)	905 Coppinger Ave. 35°48′32″N 95°15′08″W	Fort Gibson	
7	V. R. Coss House	V. R. Coss House	May 2, 1984 (#84003159)	1315 W. Okmulgee St. 35°45′11″N 95°23′04″W	Muskogee	
8	Dragoon Commandant's Quarters	Dragoon Commandant's Quarters	March 13, 1980 (#80003276)	409 Creek St. 35°47′53″N 95°15′26″W	Fort Gibson	
9	W.E.B. DuBois School		September 28, 1984 (#84003161)	Off U.S. Route 69; 35°40′05″N 95°25′24″W	Summit	
10	Escoe Building		July 14, 1983 (#83002094)	228-230 N. 2nd St. 35°44′58″N 95°22′08″W	Muskogee	Demolished circa 1988.
11	First Baptist Church	First Baptist Church	September 25, 1984 (#84003164)	6th and Denison Sts. 35°45′10″N 95°22′26″W	Muskogee	
12	First Church of Christ, Scientist	First Church of Christ, Scientist	July 15, 2019 (#100004176)	302 N. 7th St. 35°45′11″N 95°22′35″W	Muskogee	
13	First Methodist Episcopal Church	First Methodist Episcopal Church	March 11, 2014 (#14000052)	518 E. Houston St. 35°45′10″N 95°21′31″W	Muskogee	
14	F.B. Fite House and Servant's Quarters	F.B. Fite House and Servant's Quarters	October 6, 1983 (#83004198)	443 N. 16th St. 35°45′29″N 95°23′09″W	Muskogee	
15	Grant Foreman House	Grant Foreman House	September 19, 1973 (#73001565)	1419 W. Okmulgee St. 35°45′12″N 95°23′12″W	Muskogee	
16	Fort Davis		November 23, 1971 (#71000670)	2.5 miles northeast of Muskogee; 35°47′00″N 95°19′35″W	Muskogee	
17	Fort Gibson	Fort Gibson	October 15, 1966 (#66000631)	Lee and Ash Sts. 35°48′24″N 95°15′33″W	Fort Gibson	
18	Founders' Place Historic District	Founders' Place Historic District	March 13, 2020 (#100005081)	Bounded by West Martin Luther King Jr. Blvd., east side of North 12th St., Court St. and east side of North 17th St. 35°45′30″N 95°22′58″W	Muskogee	
19	Honey Springs Battlefield	Honey Springs Battlefield	September 29, 1970 (#70000848)	North of Rentiesville; 35°32′41″N 95°28′41″W	Rentiesville	Extends into McIntosh County
20	Hotel Muskogee	Hotel Muskogee	July 12, 2019 (#100004177)	26 W. Broadway St. 35°44′55″N 95°22′06″W	Muskogee	
21	Kendall Place Historic District	Kendall Place Historic District	December 16, 2005 (#05001418)	Roughly bounded by W. Okmulgee St., S. 11th St., Elgin St., an alley north of Columbus St., and S. 14th and S. 16th Sts. 35°45′17″N 95°23′05″W	Muskogee	
22	Manhattan Building	Manhattan Building	August 11, 1983 (#83002095)	325 W. Broadway; 35°44′57″N 95°22′18″W	Muskogee	
23	Manual Training High School for Negroes	Manual Training High School for Negroes	June 22, 1984 (#84003168)	704 Altamont St. 35°45′24″N 95°22′08″W	Muskogee	Destroyed in 2003. The current Sadler Arts Academy is housed in the building built in 1953 for the MTHS students and was named for the principal of MTHS from 1925 to 1945.
24	Masonic Temple	Masonic Temple	March 11, 2014 (#14000053)	121 S. 6th St. 35°44′59″N 95°22′35″W	Muskogee	
25	Moton School Campus Historic District		July 3, 2025 (#100011984)	208 W. Seminole Street; 35°45′42″N 95°32′59″W	Taft	
26	George A. Murphy House	George A. Murphy House	May 2, 1984 (#84003170)	1321 W. Okmulgee St. 35°45′11″N 95°23′05″W	Muskogee	
27	Muskogee County Courthouse	Muskogee County Courthouse	August 23, 1984 (#84003173)	216 State St. 35°45′01″N 95°22′59″W	Muskogee	
28	Muskogee Depot and Freight District	Muskogee Depot and Freight District	December 6, 2006 (#06001114)	Roughly bounded by Columbus Ave., S. Main St., Elgin Ave., and S. 5th St. 35°44′52″N 95°22′26″W	Muskogee	
29	Muskogee Municipal Building	Muskogee Municipal Building	December 18, 2013 (#13000942)	229-231 W. Okmulgee Ave. 35°44′54″N 95°22′18″W	Muskogee	
30	Nancy Taylor No. 1 Oil Well Site		November 15, 1989 (#89001962)	Haskell Lake Rd., west of U.S. Route 64; 35°50′33″N 95°43′54″W	Haskell	
31	Nash-Swindler House	Nash-Swindler House	July 13, 1979 (#79003640)	Maple and Jackson Sts. 35°47′48″N 95°14′54″W	Fort Gibson	
32	Officer's Quarters	Officer's Quarters	November 14, 1985 (#85002826)	907 Coppinger Ave. 35°48′33″N 95°15′06″W	Fort Gibson	
33	Oktaha School		August 24, 1978 (#78002242)	Off U.S. Route 69; 35°34′35″N 95°28′17″W	Oktaha	
34	Old Union Agency Cemetery		July 6, 2026 (#100012028)	Address Restricted	Muskogee vicinity	
35	A.W. Patterson House	A.W. Patterson House	May 2, 1984 (#84003322)	1320 W. Okmulgee St. 35°45′12″N 95°23′04″W	Muskogee	
36	Post Adjutant's Office	Post Adjutant's Office	November 14, 1985 (#85002827)	905 Garrison Ave. 35°48′31″N 95°15′15″W	Fort Gibson	
37	Post Blacksmith Shop	Post Blacksmith Shop	November 14, 1985 (#85002829)	905 Garrison Ave. 35°48′32″N 95°15′14″W	Fort Gibson	
38	Pre-Statehood Commercial District	Pre-Statehood Commercial District	October 6, 1983 (#83004210)	Main, Broadway, Okmulgee, and 2nd Sts. 35°45′01″N 95°22′10″W	Muskogee	
39	Railroad Exchange Building	Railroad Exchange Building	August 11, 1983 (#83002096)	2nd and Court Sts. 35°44′59″N 95°22′10″W	Muskogee	
40	Andrew W. Robb House	Andrew W. Robb House	May 11, 1982 (#82003690)	1321 Boston; 35°44′43″N 95°23′07″W	Muskogee	
41	St. Philip's Episcopal Church	St. Philip's Episcopal Church	December 18, 2013 (#13000943)	502 N. 9th St. 35°45′20″N 95°22′37″W	Muskogee	
42	St. Thomas Primitive Baptist Church	St. Thomas Primitive Baptist Church	March 3, 2004 (#04000123)	5th St., north of its junction with Chimney Mountain Rd. 35°40′09″N 95°25′28″W	Summit	
43	Seawell-Ross-Isom House	Seawell-Ross-Isom House	January 30, 1978 (#78002241)	Beauregard and Elm Sts. 35°48′14″N 95°15′24″W	Fort Gibson	
44	Severs Hotel	Severs Hotel	September 12, 1982 (#82003691)	200 N. State St. 35°44′55″N 95°22′13″W	Muskogee	
45	Sheltered Shelter District		December 15, 1978 (#78002243)	Address Restricted	Warner	
46	"Spirit of the American Doughboy" Statue	"Spirit of the American Doughboy" Statue	January 25, 2018 (#100002057)	Jack C. Montgomery VA Medical Center, 1011 Honor Heights Dr. 35°45′52″N 95°24′48″W	Muskogee	
47	Surety Building	Surety Building	September 4, 1986 (#86002156)	117 N. 3rd 35°44′57″N 95°22′17″W	Muskogee	
48	Taft City Hall	Taft City Hall	September 28, 1984 (#84003330)	Elm and Seminole Sts. 35°45′40″N 95°32′42″W	Taft	
49	Reverend L.W. Thomas Homestead		June 7, 2018 (#100002544)	5805 Oktaha Rd. 35°40′24″N 95°25′04″W	Summit	
50	A. C. Trumbo House	A. C. Trumbo House	May 2, 1984 (#84003334)	1321 W. Broadway St. 35°45′13″N 95°23′01″W	Muskogee	
51	Union Agency	Union Agency	October 6, 1970 (#70000535)	Agency Hill in Honor Heights Park; 35°46′00″N 95°25′00″W	Muskogee	
52	United States Post Office and Courthouse	United States Post Office and Courthouse	March 24, 2000 (#00000246)	101 N. 5th St. 35°44′58″N 95°22′31″W	Muskogee	
53	Ward Chapel AME Church	Ward Chapel AME Church	September 25, 1984 (#84003338)	319 N. 9th St. 35°45′16″N 95°22′41″W	Muskogee	
54	J.C. Welch House	J.C. Welch House	May 2, 1984 (#84003343)	1403 W. Okmulgee St. 35°45′13″N 95°23′10″W	Muskogee	

== See also ==
- List of National Historic Landmarks in Oklahoma
- National Register of Historic Places listings in Oklahoma
