= CBC =

CBC or cbc may refer to:

== Media ==
- Canadian Broadcasting Corporation, Canada's radio and television public broadcaster
  - CBC Television
  - CBC Radio One
  - CBC Music
  - CBC News
  - CBC Arts
  - CBC Sports
  - CBC.ca
  - Canadian Broadcasting Centre
- Cadena Baja California or Grupo Cadena, a radio and television broadcaster in Mexico
- Capital Broadcasting Center, an Egyptian television broadcasting channel
- Caribbean Broadcasting Corporation, a national radio and TV broadcaster operated by the state-owned broadcasting corporation of Barbados
  - CBC TV 8 (Barbados), the oldest broadcast station in Barbados
- CBC Benna, an Algerian television channel
- CBC Film Sales Corporation, an American film studio later renamed as Columbia Pictures
- Chubu-Nippon Broadcasting, a radio station and a TV station in Aichi Prefecture, Japan
  - CBC Radio (Japan), a radio station in Aichi Prefecture, Japan
- Comments by Celebs, an Instagram account and podcast highlighting celebrities' use of social media
- Capitol Broadcasting Company, an American media company
- CBC (Azerbaijani TV channel), an Azerbaijani television channel

== Organizations ==
=== Politics ===
- Congressional Black Caucus, an organization of African American members of the Congress of the United States

=== Business ===
- CBC Group, an Asian Healthcare investment firm
- Central Bank of the Republic of China (Taiwan), formerly known as the Central Bank of China
- Commercial Bank of Ceylon, a private bank in Sri Lanka
- Commercial Banking Company of Sydney, a former bank in Australia
- Commonwealth Business Council, an association promoting Commonwealth trade
- Companhia Brasileira de Cartuchos, a Brazilian ammunition manufacturer
- Copyright Board of Canada
- Cwmni buddiant cymunedol, the Welsh-language term for a UK community interest company

=== Education ===
- Central Bible College, a college in Springfield, Missouri, US
- Coastal Bend College, a community college in southern Texas, US
- Columbia Basin College, a community college in Pasco, Washington, US
- Columbia Bible College, a college in Abbotsford, British Columbia, Canada
- Covenant Bible College, a closed college in the Covenant, Canada
- Common Basic Cycle or Ciclo Básico Común, the basic courses for the University of Buenos Aires
- Competency Based Curriculum, the basic educational curriculum in Kenya
- Christian Brothers College High School, a Christian high school in Town and Country, Missouri

=== Other organizations ===
- Carolina Bird Club, a non-profit organisation

== Science and technology ==
- Cannabichromene, a non-psychoactive cannabinoid found in cannabis
- Cap binding complex, a protein complex
- Cipher block chaining, a block cipher mode of operation
- Common Booster Core, part of a Delta IV rocket
- Complete blood count, a blood test panel
- Cornering brake control, a car safety system
- Customer Bar Code, the barcode symbology for British postcodes and delivery point suffixes
- CBC controller, a robot controller used in Botball
- Clustering By Committee, a clustering algorithm for word-sense induction
- COIN-OR branch and cut, a linear programming optimization solver in the COIN-OR project

== Other uses ==
- CBC band, a rock band based in the former South Vietnam
- Caius Boat Club, a boat club for members of Gonville and Caius College, Cambridge, England
- Central Bedfordshire Council, the local government office in Bedfordshire, England
- Chalmers Ballong Corps, a ballooning club in Sweden
- Chemin de fer Baie des Chaleurs's reporting mark
- Christmas Bird Count, an annual bird census
- College Basketball Crown, a post-season men's basketball tournament
- Confederação Brasileira de Ciclismo, the governing body for cycling in Brazil
- Congressional Bike Caucus, an organization of American congressmen promoting cycling
- Cross-border cooperation, one of the forms of territorial cooperation in the European Union

== See also ==
- Cregagh Boys Club, former name of Northern Irish football club Cregagh Wanderers, George Best's first football team
- Central Baptist Church (disambiguation)
- Calvary Baptist Church (disambiguation)
- Children's Book Council (disambiguation)
- Christian Brothers College (disambiguation)
- CBBC (disambiguation)
