= CCBC =

CCBC may refer to:

- Canadian Children's Book Centre
- Canada China Business Council, an organization to promote trade between Canada and China
- China Construction Bank Corporation, a very large, Beijing-based bank
- Capitol City Baptist Church (West Avenue, Quezon City), a church in the Philippines

United Kingdom:

- Caerphilly County Borough Council, a local government authority in south east Wales
- Churchill College Boat Club, a rowing club at the University of Cambridge, England
- Christ's College Boat Club, another Cambridge rowing club
- Collingwood College Boat Club, a rowing club at the University of Durham, England
- Conwy County Borough Council, a local government authority in north Wales
- County Court Bulk Centre, a court handling non-hardcopy proceedings in England & Wales

United States:

- Calvary Chapel Bible College, California (formerly Florida)
- Community College of Baltimore County, Maryland
- Community College of Beaver County, Pennsylvania
- Coca-Cola Bottling Co., a soft drink distributor

== See also ==
- CBC (disambiguation)
- CBBC (disambiguation)
- CBCC (disambiguation)
