= Central Baptist Church =

Central Baptist Church may refer to:

== India ==
- Central Baptist Church (Delhi)

== United Kingdom ==
- Central Baptist Church (Leicester)
- Central Baptist Church, Southampton

== United States ==
- Central Baptist Church (Miami, Florida), listed on the National Register of Historic Places (NRHP)
- Central Baptist Church (Honolulu, Hawaii)
- Central Baptist Church (St. Louis, Missouri)
- Central Baptist Church (Muskogee, Oklahoma), NRHP-listed
- Central Baptist Church (Charleston, South Carolina), NRHP-listed
- Central Baptist Church (Sioux Falls, South Dakota)
