= Calvary Baptist Church =

Calvary Baptist Church may refer to the following churches in the United States:

- Calvary Baptist Church (Washington, D.C.)
- First Baptist Church (Davenport, Iowa), also known as Calvary Baptist Church, listed on the NRHP in Iowa
- Calvary Baptist Church (Wichita, Kansas), listed on the NRHP in Kansas
- Calvary Baptist Church (Jackson, Mississippi), listed on the NRHP in Mississippi
- Calvary Baptist Church (Ocean View, New Jersey), listed on the NRHP in New Jersey
- Calvary Baptist Church (Manhattan)
- Calvary Baptist Church (Ossining, New York), listed on the NRHP in New York as St. Paul's Episcopal Church and Rectory (its original name)
- Calvary Baptist Church (Oklahoma City), listed on the NRHP in Oklahoma
- Calvary Baptist Church (Chester, Pennsylvania)
- Calvary Baptist Church (Providence, Rhode Island), listed on the NRHP in Rhode Island
- Calvary Baptist church (Bayou Chicot, Louisiana)
