= Baltimore Hotel =

Baltimore Hotel may refer to:

- Baltimore Hotel (Muskogee, Oklahoma), U.S.
- Lord Baltimore Hotel, Baltimore, Maryland, U.S.
- Biltmore Hotel, Los Angeles, California, U.S.
