= CBCC =

CBCC may refer to:

- CBCC-FM, a radio rebroadcaster (91.9 FM) licensed to Hearst, Ontario, Canada, rebroadcasting CBCS-FM
- CBCC-TV, a television retransmitter (channel 5) licensed to Hearst, Ontario, Canada, retransmitting CBLT

== See also ==
- CBC (disambiguation)
- CBBC (disambiguation)
- CCBC (disambiguation)
