= Manhattan Construction Company =

American construction company

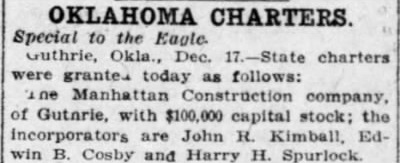
Manhattan Construction Company Charter - December 17, 1907

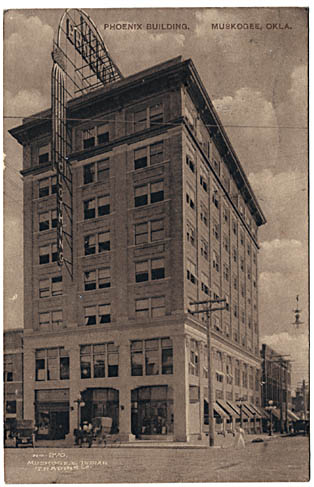
Manhattan Building - Muskogee, Oklahoma

The Manhattan Construction Company is an American-owned construction company founded by Laurence H. Rooney in Chandler in Oklahoma Territory in 1896. Today, the firm operates under its parent company, Manhattan Construction Group with affiliates Cantera Concrete Co. and Manhattan Road & Bridge. Manhattan Construction Group is recognized by Engineering News-Record as a top general builder, green builder and bridge builder in the nation. In 2013 and 2012 Manhattan has received more than 50 industry honors for quality and safety. The company's services include "Builder-Driven Pre-Construction", construction management, general building, design-build and turn-key projects, and roads, bridges and civil works. The company works in the U.S., Mexico, Central America and the Caribbean. Not to be confused with Manhattan Construction of Durham Region.

== History ==
The Manhattan Construction Company was founded in 1896 by Laurence H. Rooney, and primary ownership remains in the Rooney family, today by Francis Rooney.

As the first company to incorporate (1907) in the State of Oklahoma, Manhattan played an important part in building the Southwest. Among the dozens of schools and courthouses, Manhattan also built the first State Capitol in Guthrie and worked on the relocated Oklahoma State Capitol building in Oklahoma City, Oklahoma. Another major historical landmark constructed was the First National Bank building in Oklahoma City, which at the time was the tallest structure west of the Mississippi River.

During World War II, Manhattan completed over one billion dollars in military base, hangar, apron, barrack and other defense mobilization projects for the United States Defense Department. For such achievements during World War II, Manhattan was awarded two of the coveted Army-Navy “E” awards for excellence.

Since its founding, Manhattan expanded south to Texas, east to Washington, D.C., Georgia and Florida, and internationally to Mexico and now performs work throughout the United States, Mexico and the Caribbean.

== Notable projects ==
Manhattan Construction built the Manhattan Building, Oklahoma State Capitol Dome, NRG Stadium, the George Bush Presidential Library, Rangers Ballpark in Arlington, the Cato Institute headquarters, the Prayer Tower at the Oral Roberts University in Tulsa, Oklahoma, United States Capitol Visitor Center, and many more. The most notable project completed is the Dallas Cowboys home stadium, AT&T Stadium in Arlington, Texas.

Manhattan Construction also built the George Mason University Founders Hall in Arlington, Virginia and George Washington University Hospital in Washington D.C. In 2013, Manhattan Construction finished building the George W. Bush Presidential Library, making it the only construction company to have built two presidential libraries.

A number of its works are listed on the National Register of Historic Places.

== Works ==
Works include:

- Chemistry Building-University of Arkansas, Fayetteville, Campus Dr., Fayetteville, Arkansas (Manhattan Construction), NRHP-listed
- Garvin County Courthouse, Courthouse Sq. and Grant Ave., Pauls Valley, Oklahoma (Manhattan Const. Co.), NRHP-listed
- Logan County Courthouse, 301 E. Harrison St., Guthrie, Oklahoma (Manhattan Construction Co.), NRHP-listed
- Miller County Courthouse, 400 Laurel St., Texarkana, Arkansas (Manhattan Construction), NRHP-listed
- Muskogee County Courthouse, 216 State St., Muskogee, Oklahoma (Manhattan Construction Co.), NRHP-listed
- Muskogee Depot and Freight District, roughly bounded by Columbus Ave., S. Main St., Elgin Ave., and S 5th St., Muskogee, Oklahoma (Manhattan Const. Co.), NRHP-listed
- Oklahoma County Courthouse, 321 Park Ave., Oklahoma City, Oklahoma (Manhattan Construction Co.), NRHP-listed
- Pawnee County Courthouse, Courthouse Sq., Pawnee, Oklahoma (Manhattan Construction Co.), NRHP-listed
- Sebastian County Courthouse-Ft. Smith City Hall, 100 S. 6th St., Fort Smith, Arkansas (Manhattan Construction Co.), NRHP-listed

== Office locations ==
Tulsa, Okla.; Oklahoma City, Okla.; Naples, Fla.; Fort Myers, Fla.; Houston, Texas; Dallas, Texas; Washington, D.C.; Tampa, Florida

== See also ==
- Manhattan Building
