= Louis LaBeaume =

American architect (1873–1961)

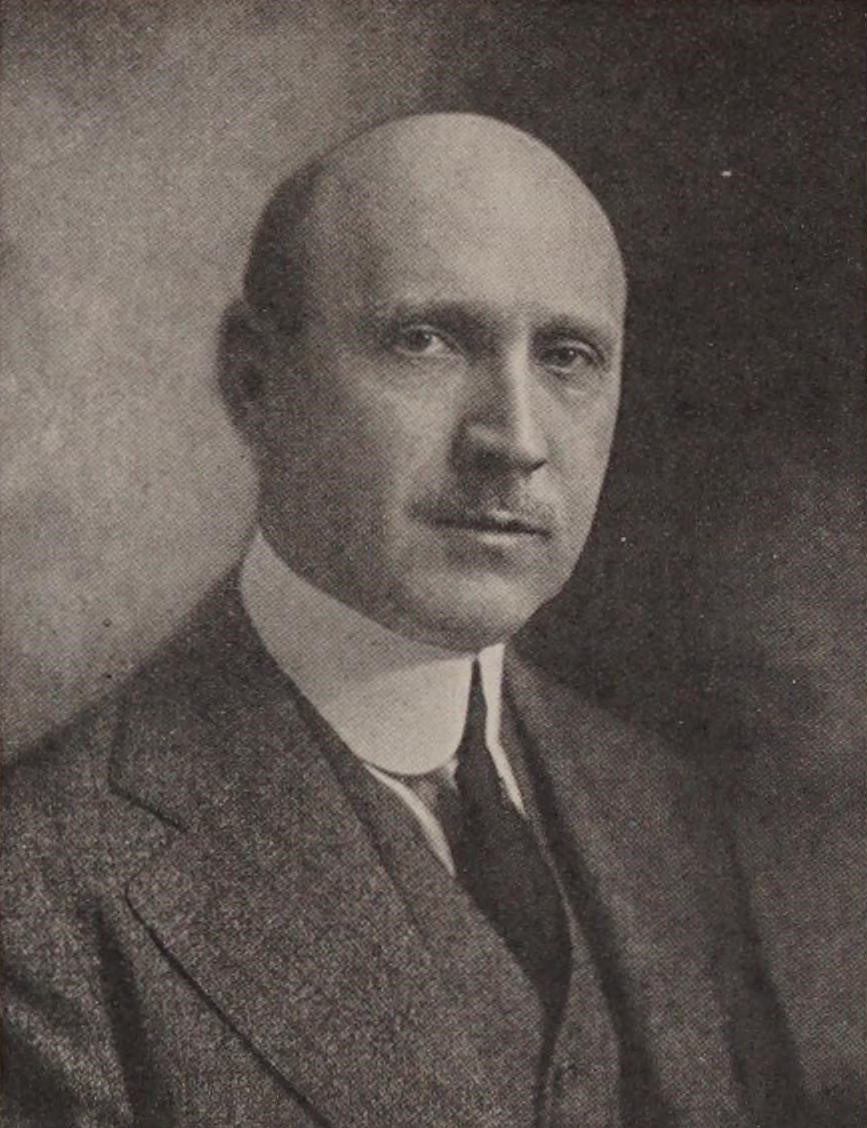
- Louis LaBeaume, c. 1915
- Born: July 31, 1873; St. Louis
- Died: November 9, 1961 (aged 88); St. Louis
- Occupation: Architect
- Awards: Fellow, American Institute of Architects (1923); National Academician, National Academy of Design (1949)
- Practice: Mariner & LaBeaume; LaBeaume & Klein; LaBeaume, Abbitt & Unland; LaBeaume & Unland

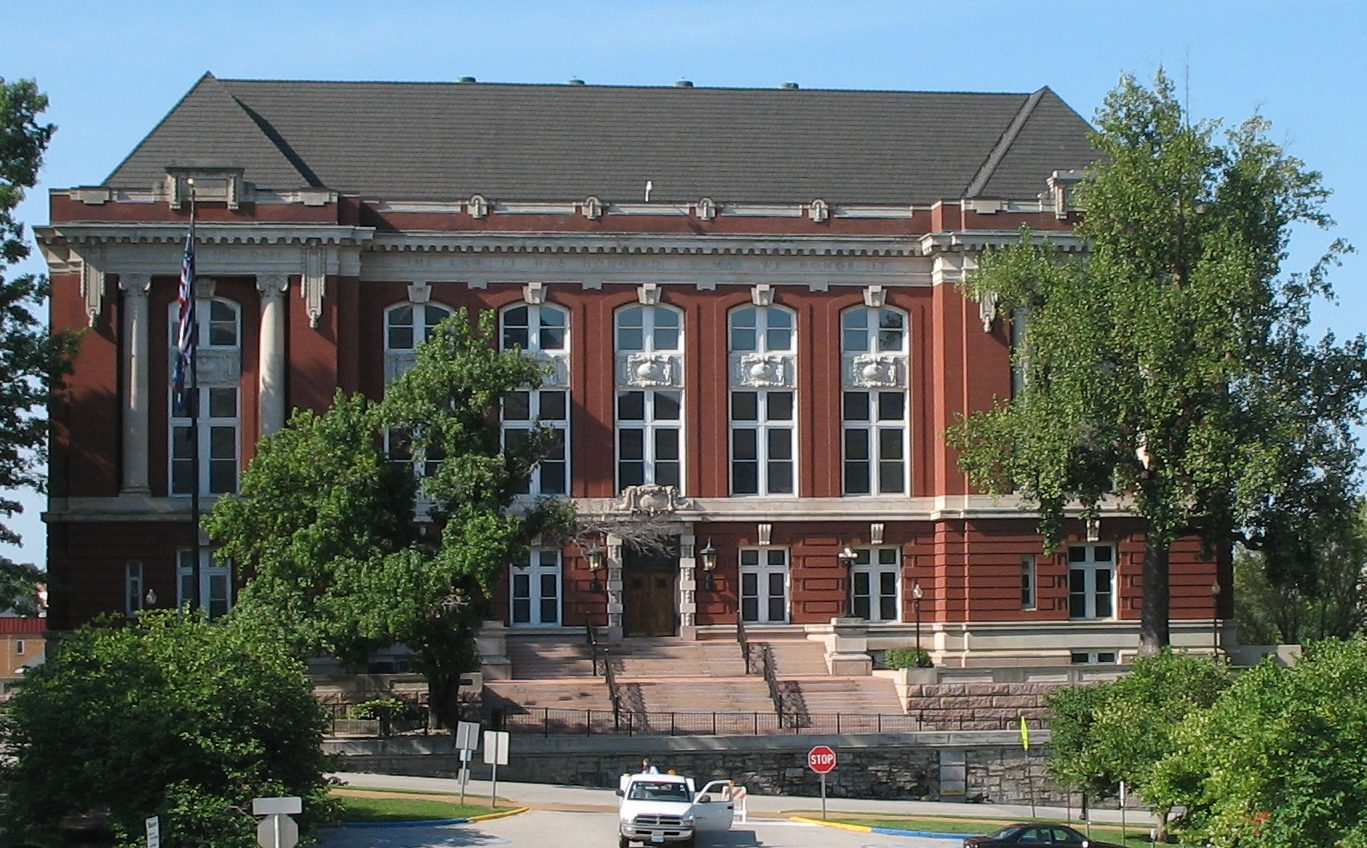
The Supreme Court of Missouri building in Jefferson City, designed by Mariner & LaBeaume in the Beaux-Arts style and completed in 1907.

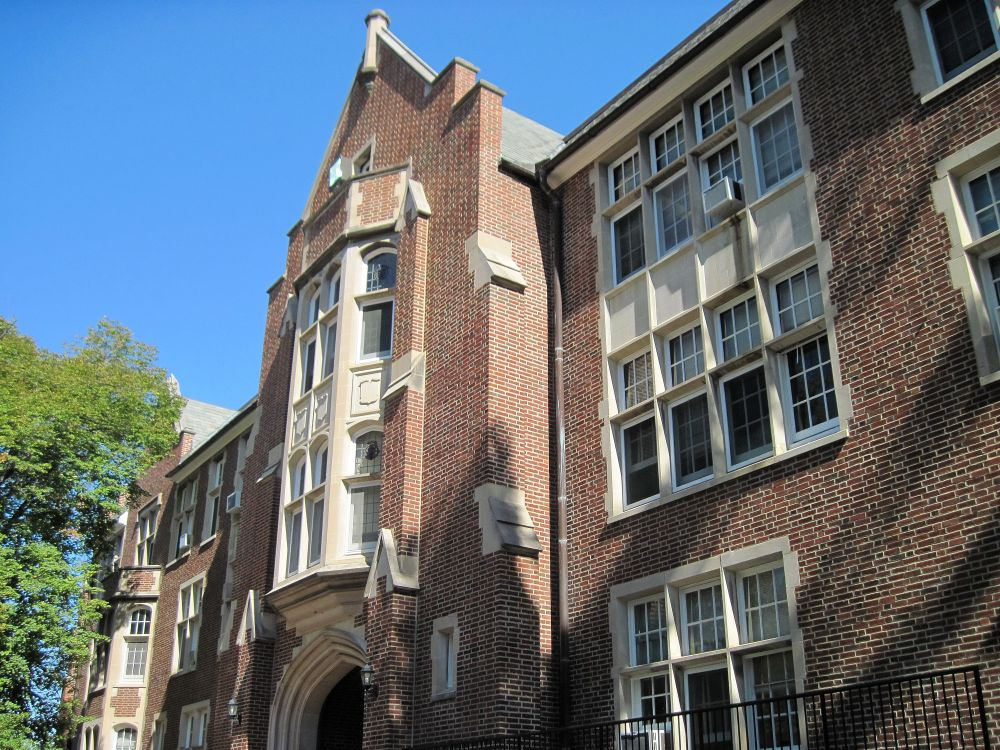
Roemer Hall of Lindenwood University, designed by LaBeaume & Klein in the Collegiate Gothic style and completed in 1921.

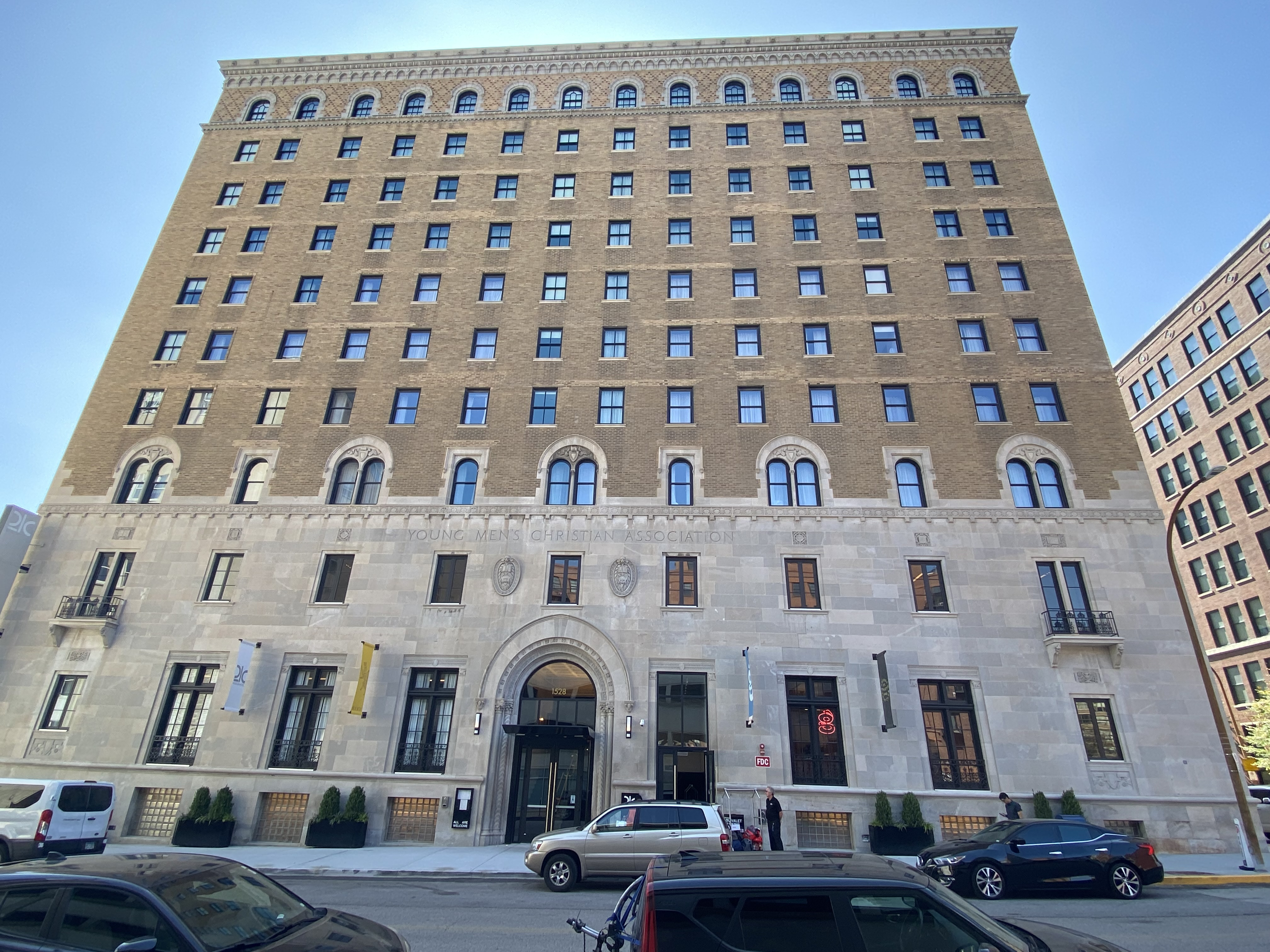
The former Downtown YMCA Building in St. Louis, designed by LaBeaume & Klein in the Italian Renaissance Revival style and completed in 1926.

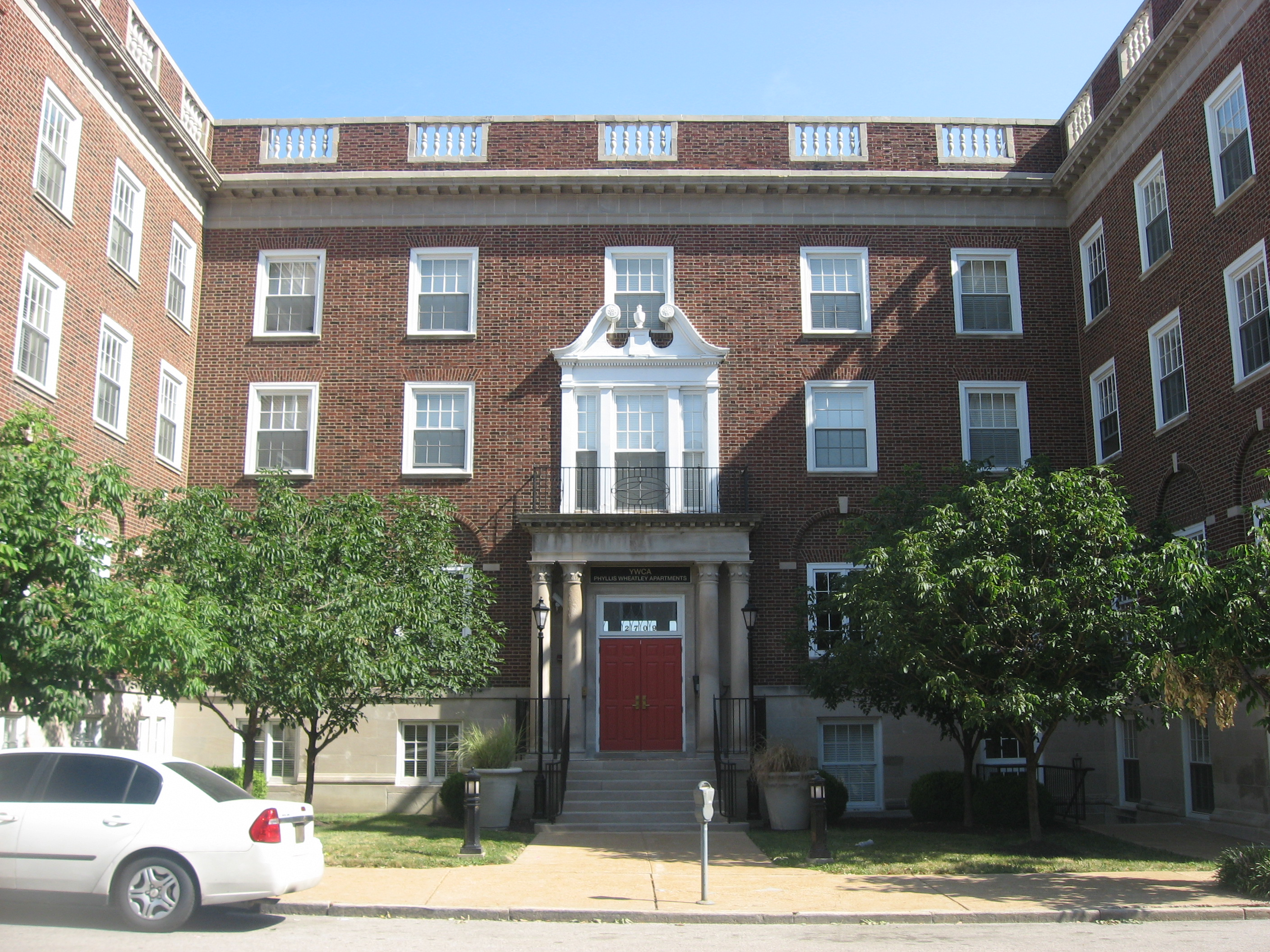
The St. Louis Women's Christian Association in St. Louis, later the Phillis Wheatley Branch of the YWCA, designed by LaBeaume & Klein in the Colonial Revival style and completed in 1927.

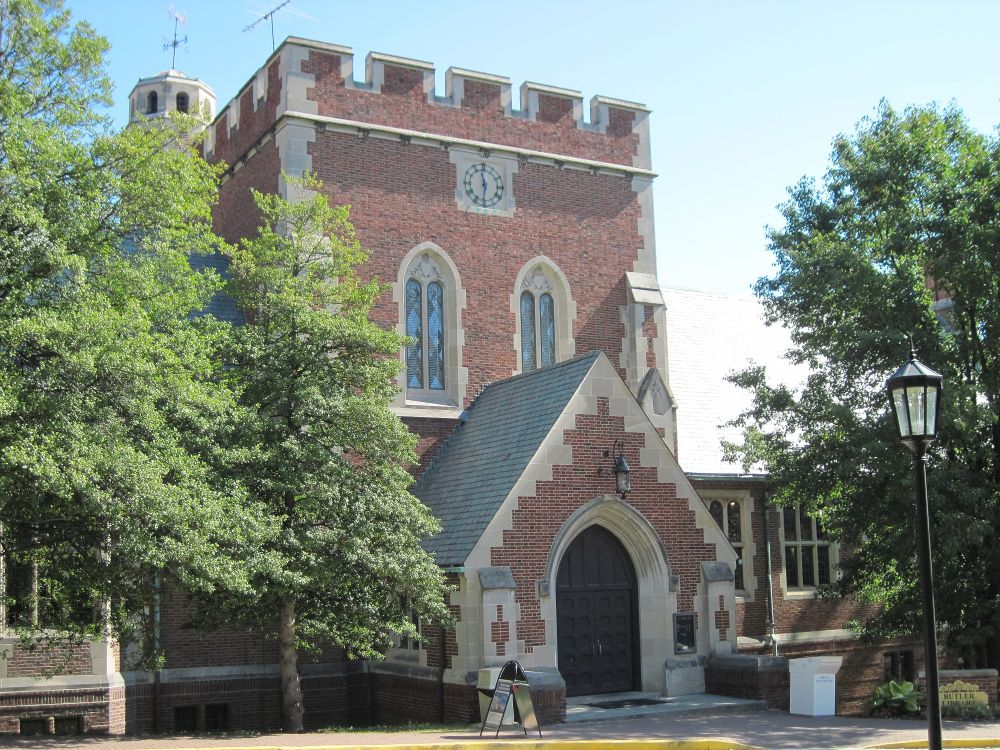
Butler Library of Lindenwood University, designed by LaBeaume & Klein in the Collegiate Gothic style and completed in 1929.

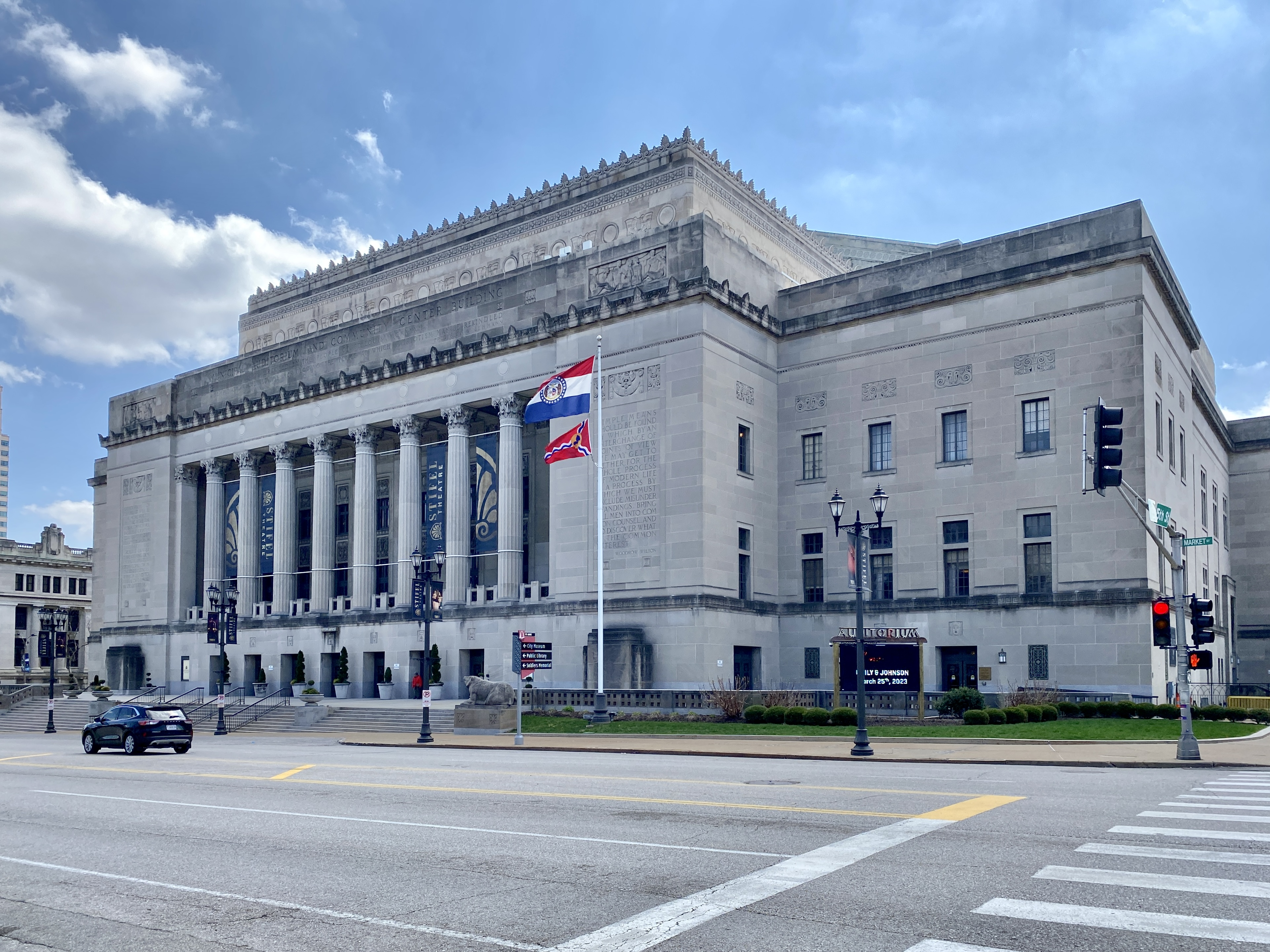
The Stifel Theatre, originally the Kiel Opera House, in St. Louis, designed by LaBeaume & Klein in the Beaux-Arts style and completed in 1934. The attached and complementary Kiel Auditorium was demolished in 1992.

Louis LaBeaume NA FAIA (July 31, 1873 – November 9, 1961) was an American architect in the Beaux-Arts tradition. He practiced in St. Louis from 1904 until his retirement c. 1956. For over thirty years, from 1912 until 1944, he worked in partnership with architect Eugene S. Klein FAIA (March 11, 1876 – November 20, 1945) in the firm of LaBeaume & Klein. They had a prolific practice centered on St. Louis and their exceptional work was the combined Kiel Opera House and Kiel Auditorium, completed in 1934 and partially extant.

== Life and career ==
Louis LaBeaume was born July 31, 1873, in St. Louis to Louis T. LaBeaume and Angilina LaBeaume, née Nance. His family had lived in St. Louis since the 18th century. His great grandfather, Louis LaBeaume, was a Frenchman who came to St. Louis in 1792 to be secretary to Zénon Trudeau, lieutenant-governor of Upper Louisiana, and was long prominent in the early public affairs of the city.

LaBeaume was educated at the Manual Training School of Washington University, graduating in 1890, and was a special student in architecture at Columbia University from 1895 to 1897. He worked for architects in New York City and Boston and traveled in Europe from 1900 to 1901. In New York City he had worked for Parish & Schroeder and in Boston for Andrews, Jaques & Rantoul, Peabody & Stearns and C. Howard Walker. In 1902 he was invited by Emmanuel Louis Masqueray, chief of design for the Louisiana Purchase Exposition in St. Louis, to join his staff. LaBeaume would have been familiar with plans for the fair, as his last employer, Walker, was involved in its early planning. He worked on designs for the exposition until it opened in 1904, when he formed the partnership of Mariner & LaBeaume with established architect Guy C. Mariner. The partnership was quickly successful, their works including the Supreme Court of Missouri building (1907) in Jefferson City and the Severs Hotel (1912) in Muskogee, Oklahoma.

In 1912 Mariner withdrew and LaBeaume formed a new partnership, LaBeaume & Klein, with Eugene S. Klein. Klein was also a native of St. Louis and had been educated at Harvard University, graduating with a BS in architecture in 1901. He worked for Mauran, Russell & Garden and its successor, Mauran, Russell & Crowell, until joining LaBeaume. For the next thirty years, LaBeaume & Klein had a brisk practice. Klein died in 1945, a year after suffering a disabling injury in an automobile accident in Rolla en route to Fort Leonard Wood, where the firm had work underway. LaBeaume continued the firm, first under the name LaBeaume, Abbitt & Unland and later as LaBeaume & Unland. His partners in the latter part of his career were Macon A. Abbitt and Theodore F. Unland. He retired from practice c. 1956. LaBeaume was a traditionalist and proponent of Beaux-Arts methods, and a critic and unhappy adoptee of modern architecture.

LaBeaume was a member of the City Plan Commission from 1914 to 1916, when he resigned to join the board of control of the Saint Louis Art Museum, of which he was president from 1931 until his resignation in 1941. In 1925 he joined the newly organized Plaza Commission, the group responsible for the planning of Memorial Plaza. The commission delegated the design of individual buildings to its member firms; LaBeaume & Klein were responsible for the combined Kiel Opera House and Kiel Auditorium, completed in 1934. As that project neared completion he joined the planning process of the Jefferson National Expansion Memorial, now Gateway Arch National Park. He was a friend of Luther Ely Smith, who conceived the project, and prepared preliminary plans which were not accepted. In 1935 he prepared guidelines for an architectural design competition for the same project. The project moved slowly and was ultimately delayed due to World War II. After the war LaBeaume developed a new set of guidelines, and the two-stage competition was opened in July of 1947. LaBeaume was a member of the jury which unanimously selected the proposal submitted by Eero Saarinen.

LaBeaume was a Fellow of the American Institute of Architects (AIA), a National Academician of the National Academy of Design and a member of the Noonday Club of St. Louis and the Century Association of New York City. His service to the AIA included three years as a member of the board of directors, from 1928 to 1931, and a single term as first vice president in 1935–36. His partner, Klein, was also honored with AIA Fellowship.

== Personal life ==
LaBeaume was married in 1905 to Emma Updike. They had no children. LaBeaume designed and built his family home in 1909 at 40 Waterman Place, part of Waterman Avenue until 1975. He died at home in St. Louis at the age of 88.

About 1910 LaBeaume traveled in Mexico and studied its architecture. This trip was the basis for The Picturesque Architecture of Mexico, published in 1915. He became a prolific writer and commenter on architectural topics. In retirement he collected his writings in a second book, Our Architectural Confusion, published in 1959. This was generally received positively by the professional architectural press, but not elsewhere; historian William H. Jordy in Landscape found LaBeaume himself "confused," prejudiced and historically illiterate.

== Legacy ==
At least five buildings designed by LaBeaume and his partners have been listed on the United States National Register of Historic Places, and others contribute to listed historic districts.

Notable architects who worked for LaBeaume include Harris Armstrong (1924–28), J. Murrell Bennett (1926–1929), Richard L. Bliss (1945–1946), Hugh Ferriss (1911–1912), Elmer A. Stuck (1924–1926) and Kenneth E. Wischmeyer (1925–1930 and 1932–1933)

== Architectural works ==
=== Mariner & LaBeaume, 1904–1912 ===
- 1907 – Harold Kauffman house, 51 Portland Pl, St. Louis
- 1907 – Missouri Building, (Note: A contributing resource to the Jamestown Exposition Site Buildings historic district, NRHP-listed in 1975.) Jamestown Exposition, Norfolk, Virginia
- 1907 – Supreme Court of Missouri, 207 W High St, Jefferson City, Missouri
- 1908 – Ayres Hall, Lindenwood University, St. Charles, Missouri
- 1908 – Central Presbyterian Church (former), 5574 Delmar Blvd, St. Louis
- 1908 – Navarre Building, (Note: Demolished.) 600 Chestnut St, St. Louis
- 1908 – William Stickney house, 46 Westmoreland Pl, St. Louis
- 1909 – Louis LaBeaume house, 40 Waterman Pl, St. Louis
- 1909 – St. Louis Public Library Divoll branch (former), 1257 Farrar St, St. Louis
- 1909 – Allen West house, 48 Westmoreland Pl, St. Louis
- 1912 – Severs Hotel, (Note: NRHP-listed.) 200 N State St, Muskogee, Oklahoma
- 1913 – Willard Lamb Velie house, 3551 7th St, Moline, Illinois

=== LaBeaume & Klein, 1912–1945 ===
- 1912 – John Foster Shepley house, (Note: Built for a brother of architect George Foster Shepley, who died in 1903.) 53 Portland Pl, St. Louis
- 1914 – Charles Nagel house, 44 Westmoreland Pl, St. Louis
- 1917 – Niccolls Hall, Lindenwood University, St. Charles, Missouri
- 1921 – Roemer Hall, Lindenwood University, St. Charles, Missouri
- 1925 – Louderman Building, 317 N 11th St, St. Louis
- 1926 – Downtown YMCA Building, 1528 Locust St, St. Louis
- 1927 – Beaumont Medical Building, (Note: Demolished. Formerly NRHP-listed.) 3714–3726 Washington Ave, St. Louis
- 1927 – YWCA, Phillis Wheatley Branch, 2709 Locust St, St. Louis
- 1928 – St. Louis Maternity Hospital (former), 4907 Barnes Jewish Hospital Plaza, St. Louis
- 1929 – Butler Library, Lindenwood University, St. Charles, Missouri
- 1931 – Peters Memorial Presbyterian Church (former), 2601 Minnesota Ave, St. Louis
- 1931 – Second Presbyterian Church education wing, 4501 Westminster Pl, St. Louis
- 1934 – Stifel Theatre, 1400 Market St, St. Louis
- 1937 – Alton Memorial Hospital, 1 Memorial Dr, Alton, Illinois

=== LaBeaume & Unland, 1948–1956 ===
- 1950 – Cobbs Hall, Lindenwood University, St. Charles, Missouri
- 1950 – St. Paul's Lutheran Church (former), 352 W Wood St, Decatur, Illinois
- 1955 – Central Christian Church, (Note: Designed by LaBeaume & Unland, architects, with Harris, Spangler, Beall & Salogga, associate architects.) 650 W William St, Decatur, Illinois

== See also ==
- Louis LaBeaume and William Booth Papin, The Picturesque Architecture of Mexico (New York: Architectural Book Publishing Company, 1915)
- Louis LaBeaume, Our Architectural Confusion: Essays on Architecture (New York: Vantage Press, 1959)
