= CBBC (disambiguation) =

CBBC is a British children's television channel and brand (launched 1985).

CBBC may also refer to:

== Broadcasting ==
- CBBC-FM, a radio station in Lethbridge, Alberta, Canada
- Children's BBC, a broader department (now BBC Children's and Educational)

== Other uses ==
- Callable bull/bear contract, a financial derivative
- China-Britain Business Council, to promote international trade
- Bella Bella (Campbell Island) Airport, British Columbia, Canada (TC LID:CBBC)

== See also ==
- CBBC idents, identifiers for BBC's CBBC
- CBC (disambiguation)
- CCBC (disambiguation)
- CBCC (disambiguation)
