= Phyllis Wheatley YWCA (St. Louis) =

- YWCA, Phillis Wheatley Branch
- U.S. National Register of Historic Places
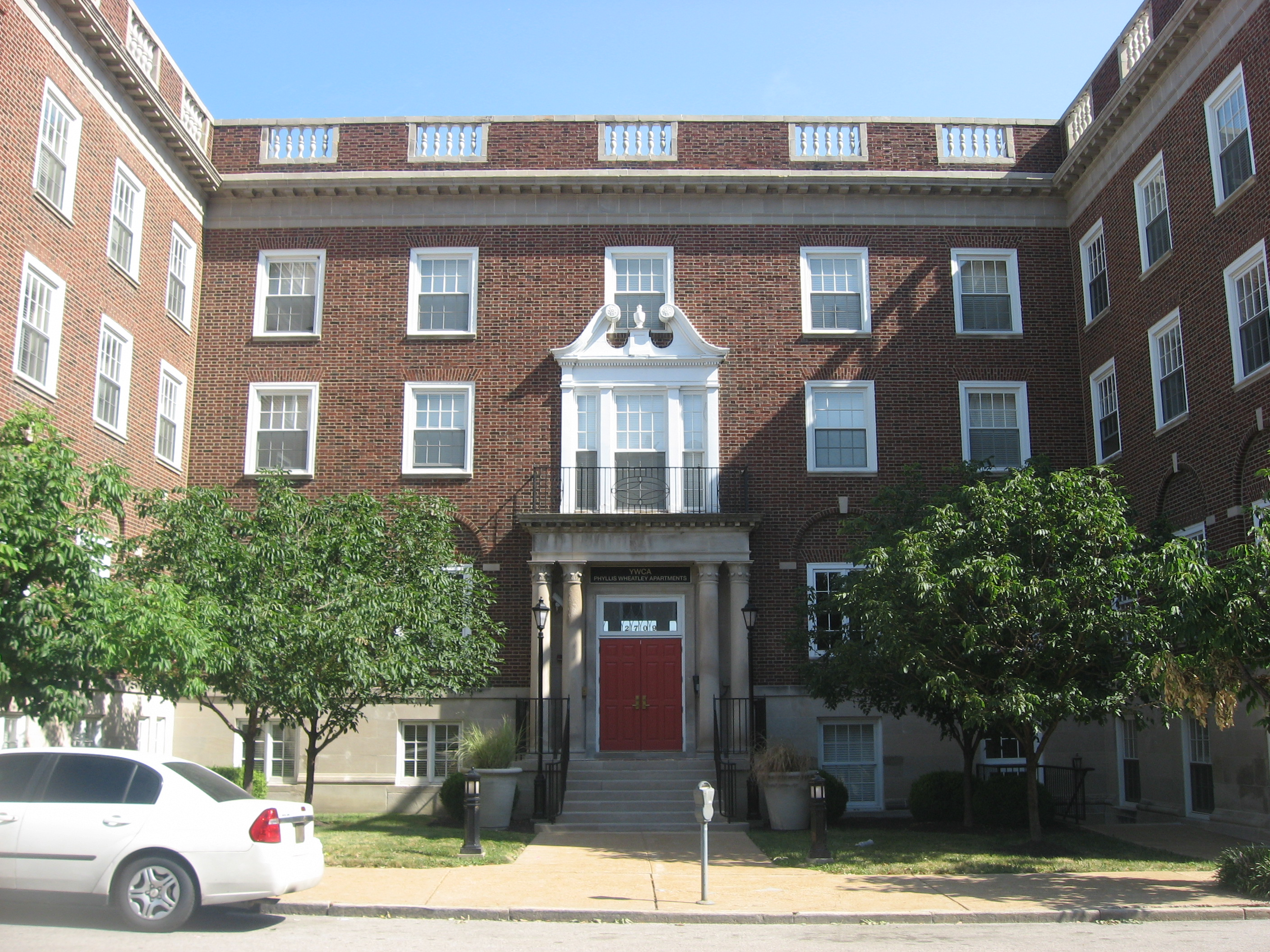

- Location within St. Louis Location within Missouri Location within the United States
- Location: 2709 Locust St., St. Louis, Missouri
- Coordinates: 38°38′4″N 90°12′59″W
- Area: less than one acre
- Built: 1927
- Architect: LaBeaume & Klein
- Architectural style: Colonial Revival
- NRHP reference No.: 84002694
- Added to NRHP: July 24, 1984

The YWCA, Phillis Wheatley Branch in St. Louis, Missouri is a building dating from 1927. It was listed on the National Register of Historic Places in 1984.

The branch was founded in 1911 and named for Phillis Wheatley, the first African-American poet. It was only the fifth YWCA for African-Americans.

The YWCA was a center of intellectual life in the Mill Creek Valley neighborhood. The Fisk Jubilee Singers performed at Wheatley in 1916, and W.E.B. Du Bois gave a lecture in 1922. Maya Angelou, Mary McLeod Bethune and Butterfly McQueen all visited or stayed in the YWCA's hotel rooms.

The building was constructed in 1927 for the St. Louis Women's Christian Association, also known as the Women's Christian Home, which was first organized in 1868. In 1941 they sold the building to the YWCA.
