= Capitol City Baptist Church (West Avenue, Quezon City) =

Coordinates: 14°39′4.1″N 121°1′43.5″E

- Capitol City Baptist Church
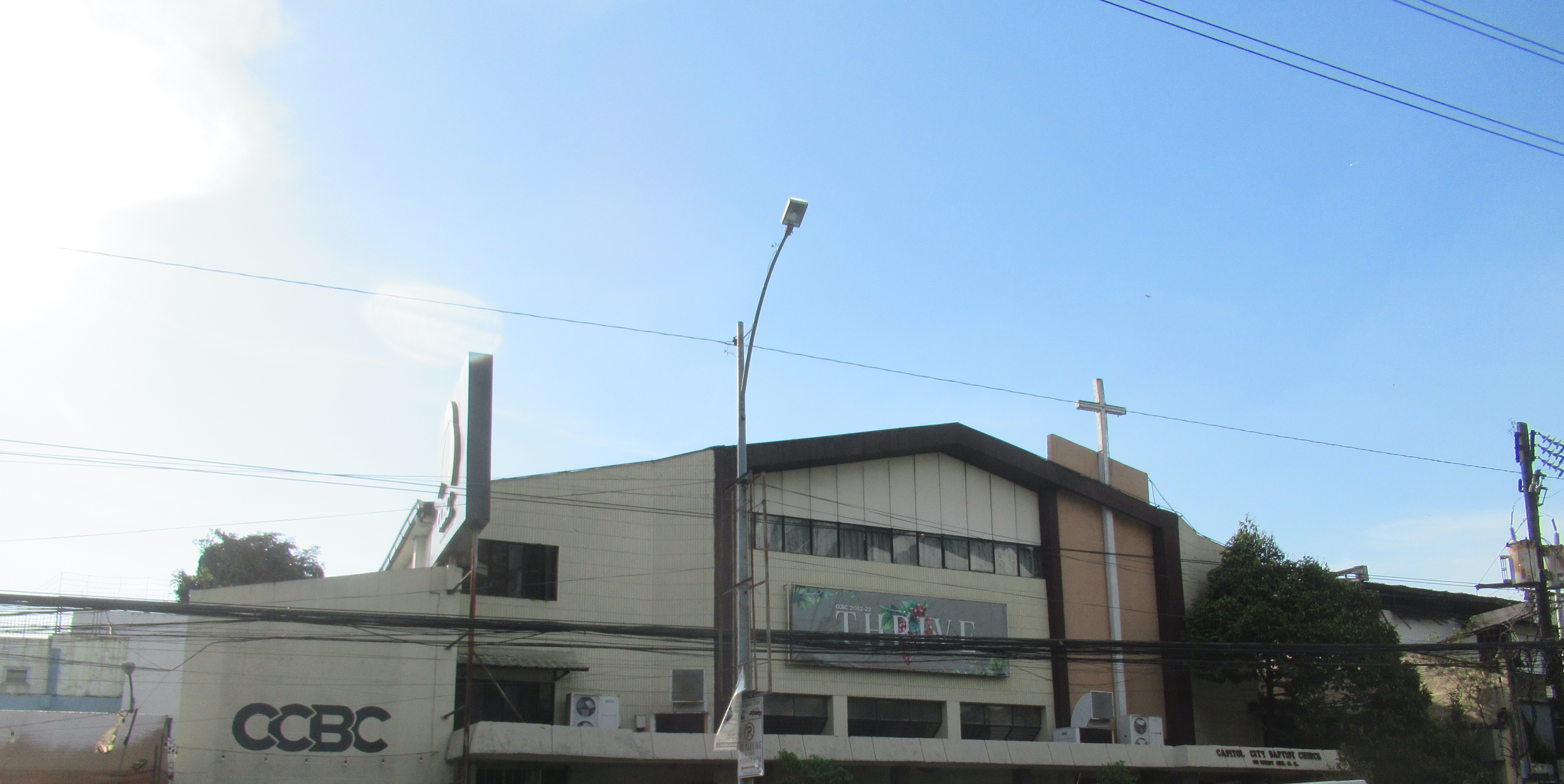
- Facade of CCBC
- Capitol City Baptist Church
- Location: 111 West Avenue, Quezon City
- Country: Philippines
- Denomination: Baptist
- Website: https://ccbc.ph

History
- Founded: 1959

Capitol City Baptist Church (CCBC) is a Baptist church located at 111 West Avenue, Quezon City, Philippines. It is affiliated with the Conservative Baptist Association of the Philippines.

== History ==
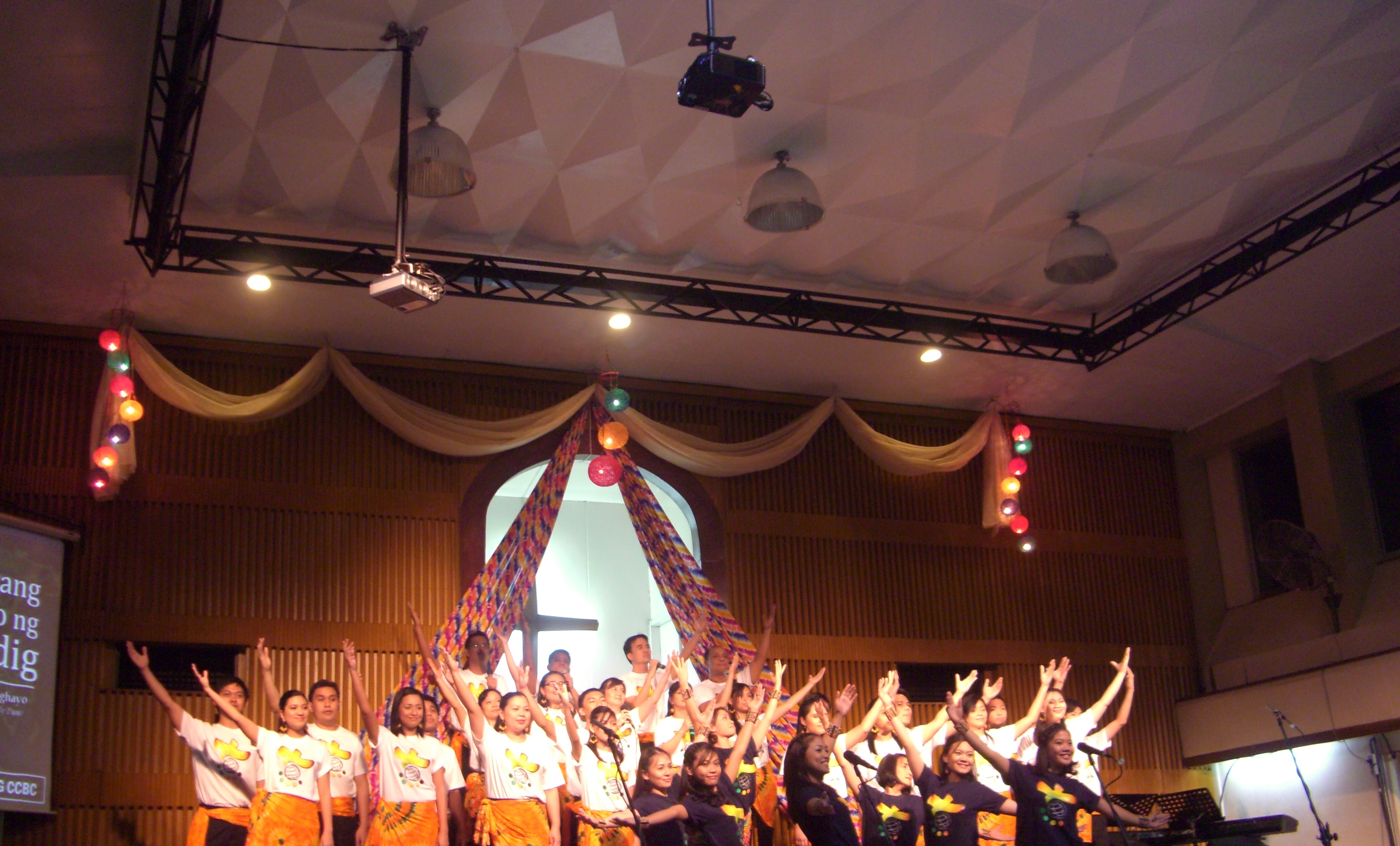
Stage of the church when viewed from the main (ground) floor. Shown here is a selection of the worship ministry performing during the 52nd anniversary celebration held on July 31, 2011.

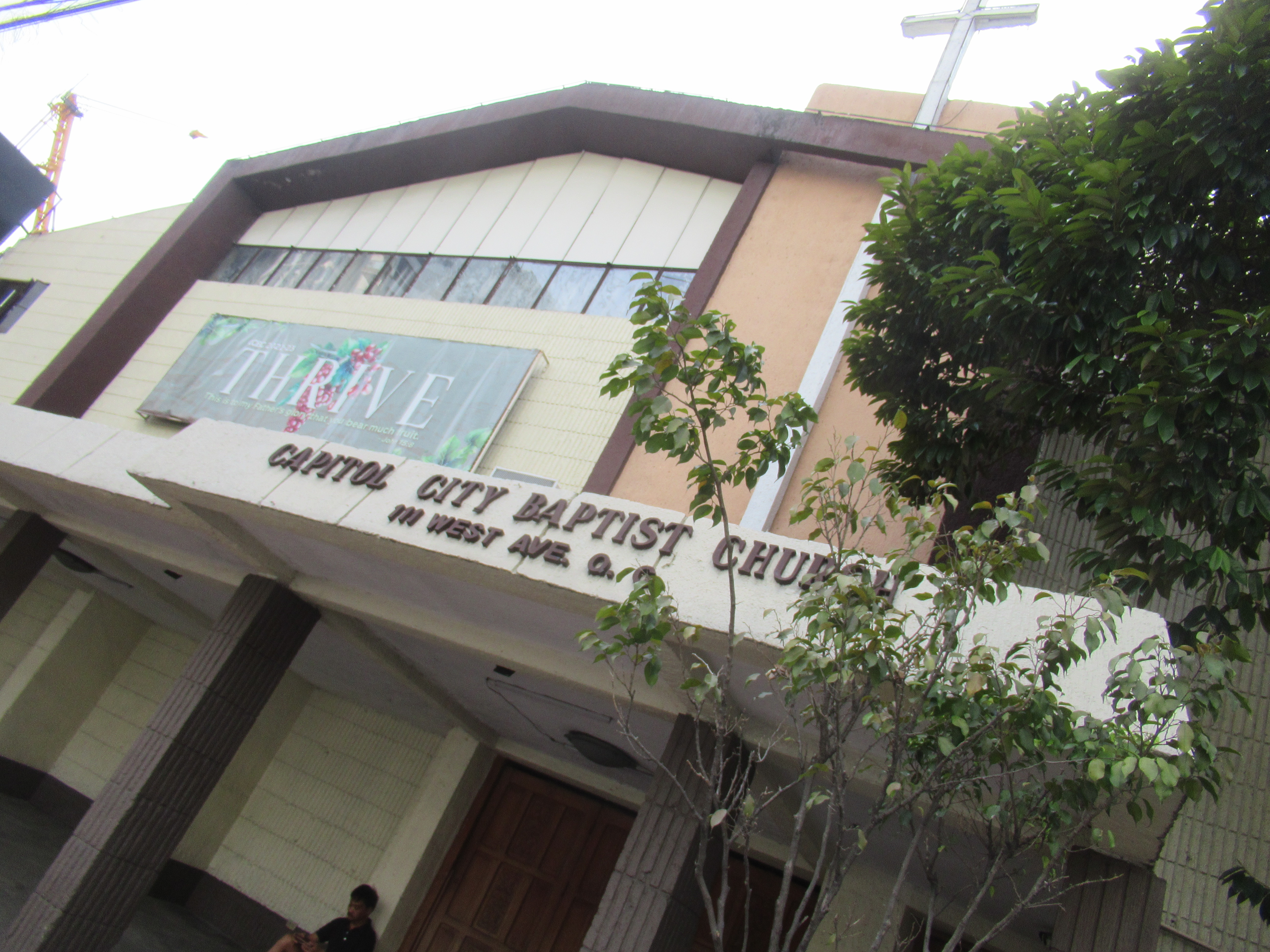
2023 facade

Rev. Arthur R. Beals served as pastor from 1962 to 1965. In July 1986, Pastor Cesar C. Castro of the Deaf Evangelistic Alliance Foundation (DEAF), Rina Dimaculangan, and CCBC Pastor Rev. Reynaldo I. Atienza established the Deaf Ministry. The Golden Ladies Fellowship was founded during this year. CCBC Caloocan was founded during this year. Dr. Reynaldo R. Avante was endorsed by the board of trustees and affirmed by the congregation to serve as Senior Pastor. On July 26, 2009, CCBC celebrated its 50th anniversary at the Henry Lee Iwrin Theater of the Ateneo de Manila University. During the event, commemorative plaques were awarded to pastors, missionaries and workers in recognition of their contributions to the church. The theme song "Ipahayag" was performed by Reynate Gungon and Nikka Mandap. The church covered each of the Beatitudes from the book of Matthew in its sermons from August to October. Throughout the month of November, the church celebrated the 10th anniversary of Youth@111 through a series of festive and thanksgiving events. In December, the church conducted an election for new board members who will serve for the years 2011 and 2012. CCBC also celebrated the Christmas season through five consecutive evening worship services similar to the Catholic's practice of “simbang gabi.” The 24/7 Missions Prayer Chain was initiated. At the start of 2011, the children ministry opened a Sunday school class that runs in parallel with the evening service. In May, Youth@111, in collaboration with Nur Factory, engaged in a peace camp held in Camp Capinpin in Rizal, with the aim of fostering better understanding and peace between Muslim and Christian children. During this year, after several months of evaluations and deliberations, Marcelo Abelado was commissioned to serve as associate pastor for the church.

During the 50th anniversary celebration of the church, plans to construct a new building on the indoor parking lot were unveiled. In 2011, after two years of silence, discussions on the building expansion resumed. As a prelude to the work to be done, the Book of Nehemiah was covered in the sermons during the fourth quarter of 2011. Preliminary calculations estimate the total expansion cost to amount to ₱70 million.

In 2012, the estimated total cost was reduced to ₱25 million, and fund raising was initiated.

== Beliefs ==
CCBC is a member of the Conservative Baptist Association of the Philippines (CBAP). In 2011, Dr. Reynaldo Avante was elected as president of CBAP for a term of two years.

The church has been in partnership with Evangelism Explosion since the early 1990s.

CCBC believes in the Bible as the ultimate source for all its teachings and practices. Specifically, the church believes in the trinity, and that Jesus died for the sins of man so that all who place their faith in him are saved from damnation. CCBC places very strong emphasis on evangelism as is evident in its mission and purpose statements; its mission statement is "In the heart of the nation, with the nations at heart," while its purpose statement is "Strategically Engaged in Nations’ Discipleship through Christ-centered Community Transformation Birthing and Building up Churches (SEND CCBC)."
