= Manhattan Building (Muskogee, Oklahoma) =

- U.S. National Register of Historic Places
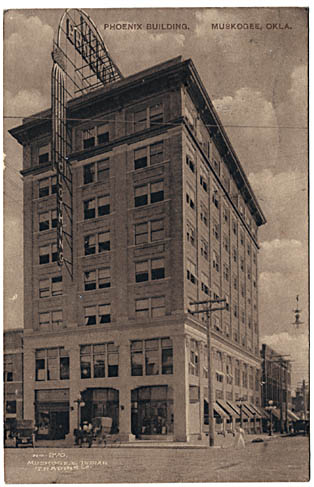
- The Manhattan Building (a.k.a. The Phoenix Clothing Building)

- Location within Oklahoma Location within the United States
- Location: 325 W. Broadway, Muskogee, Oklahoma
- Coordinates: 35°44′57.47″N 95°22′18.33″W
- Built: 1911
- Architectural style: Chicago
- MPS: Pre-Depression Muskogee Skyscrapers TR
- NRHP reference No.: 83002095
- Added to NRHP: August 11, 1983

The Manhattan Building, also known as the Phoenix Building or the Phoenix-Manhattan Building, is a historic skyscraper in Muskogee, Oklahoma, United States. The eight-story structure is 107 feet (33 m) tall, containing 50,957 square feet (4,734.1 m^{2}) of floor space, and was initially intended as the home of the Manhattan Construction Company, reportedly Oklahoma's first incorporated business. It was built in 1911 with a reinforced concrete frame and gray brick cladding. These walls were lined with windows to provide light and ventilation, the latter were essential to cope with torrid Oklahoma summers in an era when hardly any large buildings had air conditioning. It was built in Sullivanesque architectural style, with two-story columns flanking the entrance and a second floor cornice with dentils. The entry opened into a two-story lobby whose walls were covered with tile. A rooftop penthouse was added in 1957. The Manhattan Building was added to the National Register of Historic Places for architectural significance in 1983.

By 1911, Manhattan Construction was already 15 years old, and had completed several notable buildings in Oklahoma, including:

- Guthrie Convention Hall;
- Oklahoma City's First National Bank Tower;
- Oral Roberts University (Tulsa) Prayer Tower.

It is one of five skyscraper buildings, ranging from five to ten stories tall, built in 1910–1912 and included in the Pre-Depression Muskogee Skyscrapers Thematic Resources study. The others are:

- Railroad Exchange Building
- Severs Hotel
- Surety Building
- Baltimore Hotel

== Design features ==
The building was designed by Charles H. Sudhaelter and Co. whose work echoed the style of famous architect, Louis Henri Sullivan. (Note: Sullivan was a mentor of Frank Lloyd Wright.)

Manhattan Construction Company founder, Laurence H. Rooney, instead of making the building his own company's headquarters, decided to sell it to a popular retailer, Phoenix Clothing Company. He not only enlarged the first floor, but also topped the structure with a rotating electric sign that reached three stories above the roof.

== See also ==
- Manhattan Construction Company
- Francis Rooney
- BOK Financial Corporation
