= Calvary Baptist Church (Wichita, Kansas) =

Historic church in Kansas, United States

Coordinates: 37.6950°N 97.3396°W

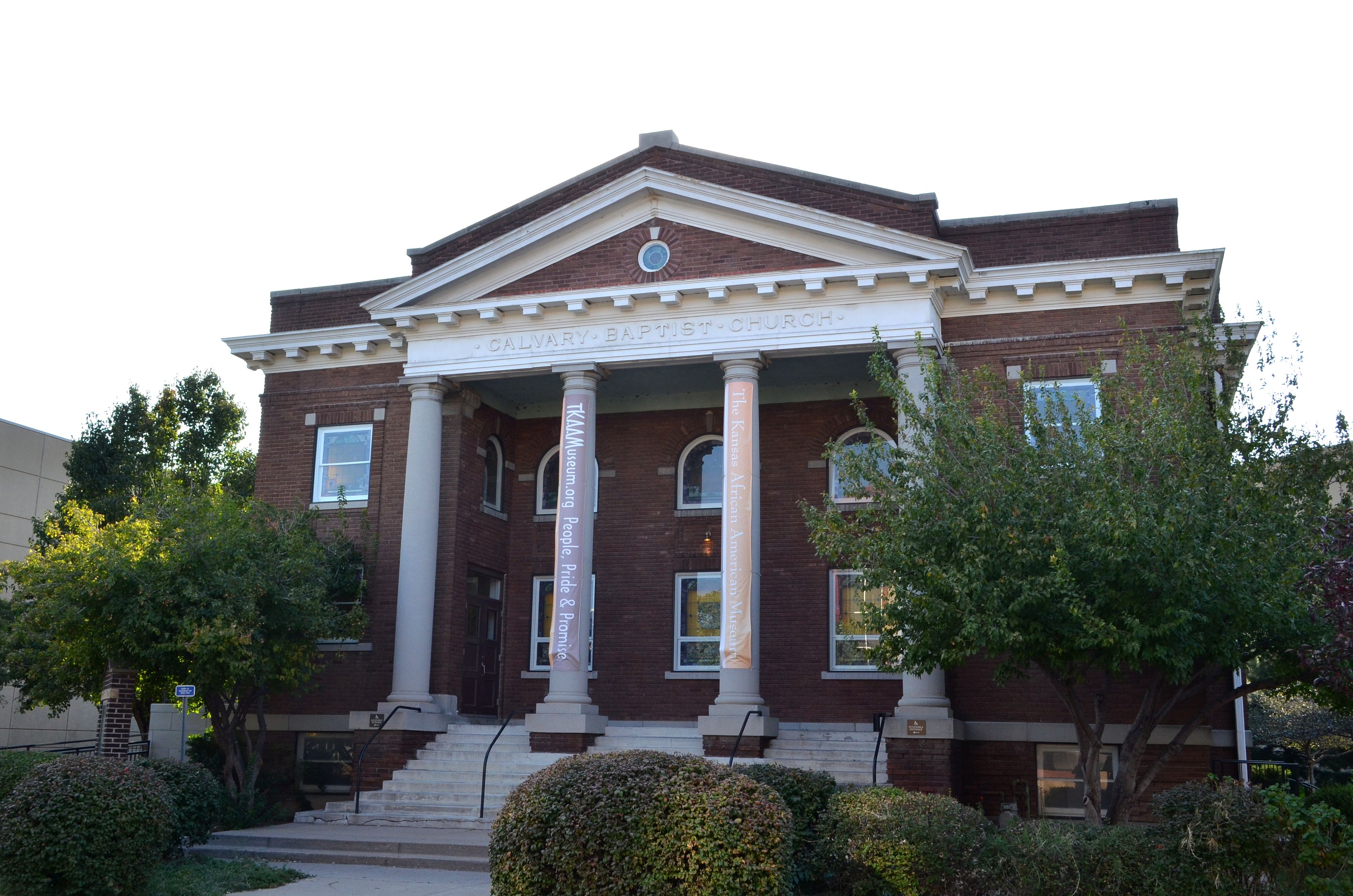
Calvary Baptist Church

Calvary Baptist Church is a historic Baptist church building at 601 North Water Street in Wichita, Kansas. It was listed on the National Register of Historic Places in 1988.

== History ==
Calvary Baptist Church was organized 1878 to serve the growing African-American population of the city. By the 1880s, there were two-dozen black families on Main Street in the shadow of the Sedgwick County Courthouse. Most had moved to Wichita from southern states after the Civil War. The city continued to attract black residents and by the 1920 census, the black population of Wichita was 3,545 with a total population of 72,200. Membership at Calvary Baptist Church stood at 500 and 15 other congregations thrived in the city. The historic black community grew to encompass a 15-block area by the 1950s when urban renewal attempts displaced many of the area's residents.

The congregation relocated to a new structure approximately 4 mi (6.4 km) north in 1972 and Sedgwick County acquired the historic structure in 1975. The building currently houses The Kansas African American Museum.

== Architecture ==
The structure was built between c.1917 and 1920 and replaced an earlier church on the site constructed in 1911 and soon deemed unsafe by the state fire marshall. It is designed in the classical revival style and constructed of red brick with limestone accents.

The church building is located on the west side of Water Street, north of Elm Street. The Sedgwick County Jail, constructed between 1990 and 2001 wraps around three sides of the church. The structure measures 50 ft × 94 ft (15 m × 29 m) with a 8 ft × 26 ft (2.4 m × 7.9 m) one-story addition at the rear. The two main floors sit on a raised basement.

The east façade is dominated by the entrance which consists of a triangular pediment resting on four two-story limestone columns. A flight of stairs leads from the street level to a small portico containing entrance doors. A Dentiled cornice extends from the pediment around the building just above the second floor.

The interior is dominated by the Akron-plan worship space which occupies the center of the building. The main sanctuary is on the main level with a three-level balcony that wraps three sides and allows for increased capacity. The chancel occupies one corner of the space with the organ pipes in the wall above. Portions of the main floor can be closed to accommodate Sunday school classes or other activities. The sanctuary contains several stained glass windows and an octagonal stained glass skylight. Many of the windows were donated by members of the congregation and contain dedications.

The congregation purchased the organ from the M. P. Moller Company for $3,900. It contains 21 stops with three manuals. The lower level contains additional meeting space, offices and restrooms.

The Negro Star reported in its September 24, 1920 edition that the total construction cost for the facility was $60,000.
