= Surety Building =

- U.S. National Register of Historic Places
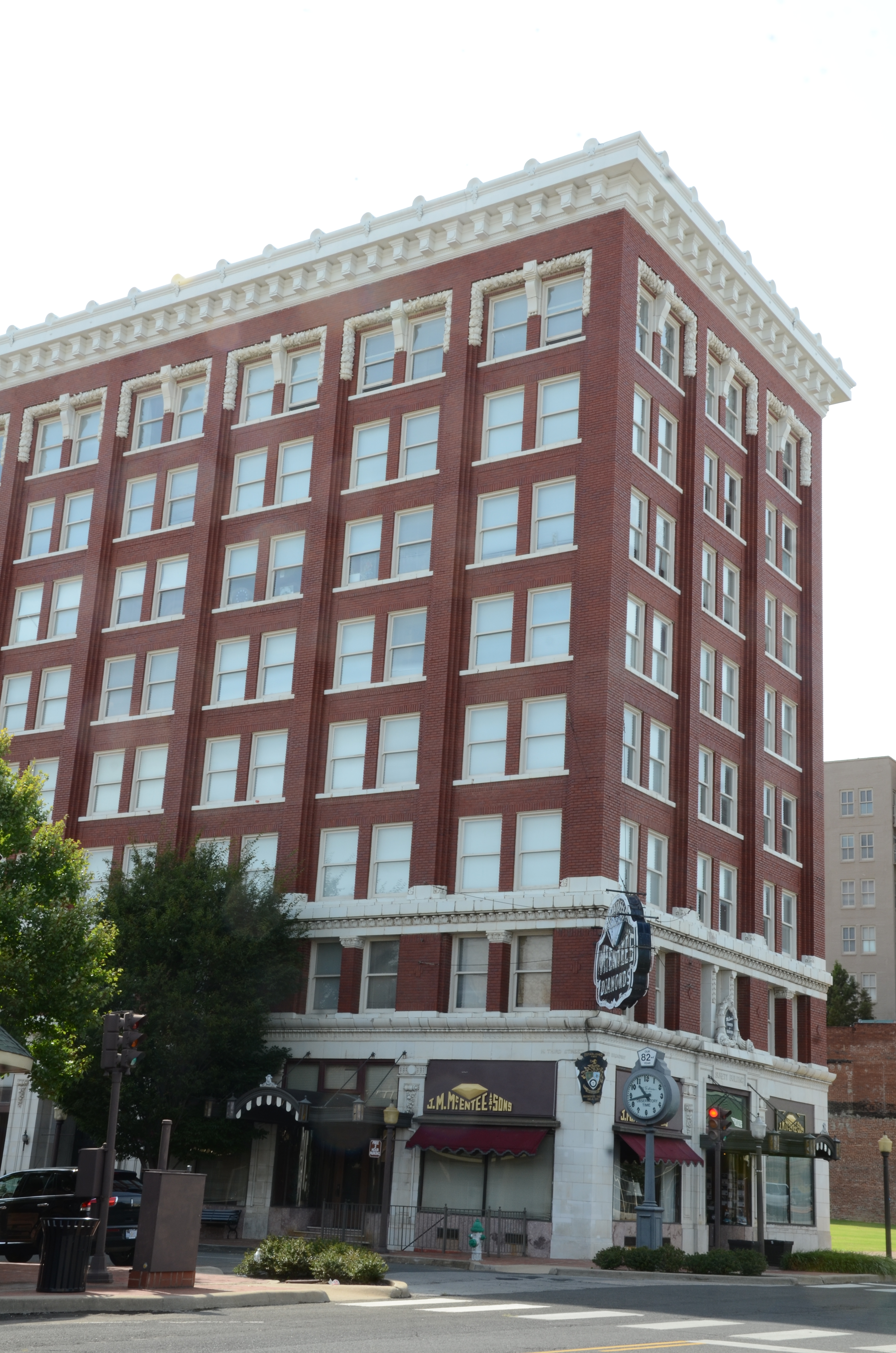
- Surety Building, 2015

- Location within Oklahoma Location within the United States
- Location: 117 N. Third, Muskogee, Oklahoma
- Coordinates: 35°44′56.85″N 95°22′16.72″W
- Built: 1910
- Architectural style: Chicago
- MPS: Pre-Depression Muskogee Skyscrapers TR
- NRHP reference No.: 86002156
- Added to NRHP: September 4, 1986

The Surety Building in Muskogee, Oklahoma is an eight-story skyscraper built for the Southern Surety Company in 1910.

It is one of five skyscraper buildings, ranging from five to ten stories tall, built in 1910–1912 and included in the Pre-Depression Muskogee Skyscrapers Thematic Resources study. The others are:

- Baltimore Hotel,
- Manhattan Building,
- Railroad Exchange Building, and
- Severs Hotel.

It was individually listed on the National Register of Historic Places in 1986.

== General description ==
The Surety Building was constructed in 1910 in downtown Muskogee, at the corner of Broadway and Third Street by the Southern Surety Company. The approximate cost was $325,000. It was the first building in Eastern Oklahoma to be considered a skyscraper. It was used as offices by government officials, attorneys, petroleum companies, and land developers.

Although the architect is not known, the building's style is classed as Sullivanesque Chicago Style. It is a skeleton-framed rectangular structure with a flat roof. It has the characteristics employed by Louis Sullivan, such as elaborate projecting cornices, ornate two-story base and linteled windows with vertical bands.

== Conversion to senior-living apartments ==
The building was converted into affordable apartments designed for senior living. It contains 18 one-bedroom units and 19 two-bedroom units, which went into service in 2006. Funding for the conversion was provided through the Federal Low Income Housing Tax Credit Program.
