= Infrastructure fund =

Investment fund

An infrastructure fund is a privately offered or publicly listed fund that invests directly or indirectly in infrastructure and associated industries. Examples of direct investments include the purchase of stocks and bonds through public markets, or project finance. Examples of indirect investment includes investment in private infrastructure funds or preexisting, publicly listed infrastructure funds and indexes. Definitions of "infrastructure" vary, but often include power plants, water and waste management systems, transportation systems, communications systems, and oil and gas pipelines. Definitions may also include healthcare and educational facilities.

A 2021 study found that, in part due to the compensation structures and the duration of typical investments, infrastructure funds tend deliver returns worse than investors may assume, and were subject to fluctuations due to economic cycles. In February 2023, Bloomberg reported that Preqin predicted some $1.87 trillion would be dedicated to infrastructure investments by 2026.

== Global investment needs ==
According to the World Bank, developing and emerging economies face significant infrastructure investment gaps, particularly in transportation, energy, and water systems. Meeting expected demand for infrastructure through 2030 will require substantial private capital alongside public-sector funding.
