= Hotel Muskogee =

Historic building in Muskogee, Oklahoma, US

- U.S. National Register of Historic Places
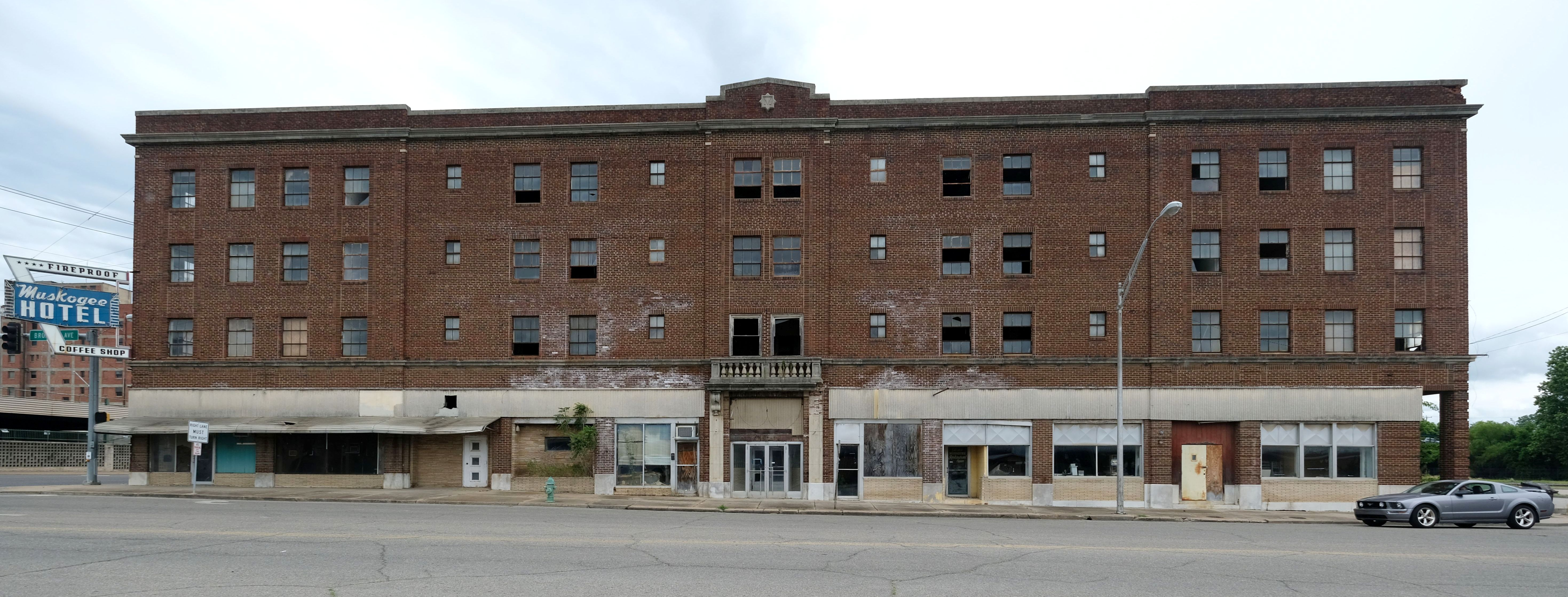

- Location within Oklahoma
- Location: 26 W. Broadway St. Muskogee, Oklahoma
- Coordinates: 35°44′55″N 95°22′06″W
- Built: 1922-23
- NRHP reference No.: 100004177
- Added to NRHP: July 12, 2019

The Muskogee Hotel, at 26 W. Broadway St. in Muskogee, Oklahoma, was listed on the National Register of Historic Places in 2019. It was listed as Hotel Muskogee.

It was built during 1922-1923 and opened in 1923.

It later became apartments for low-income residents. It was ordered closed by the city in 1992 due to disrepair, and it was in fact closed in 1996. It fell further into disrepair during subsequent years.

It is located on the northeast corner of West Broadway and North Main Street in Muskogee.

== History ==
In January 2025, a fire struck the northside of Hotel Muskogee.

In January 2026, a fire occurred in Hotel Muskogee.

In March 2026, it was announced that Hotel Muskogee will be demolished. The demolition set for May 15-18, 2026.
