= Central Baptist Church (Charleston, South Carolina) =

Historic church in South Carolina, United States

- U.S. National Register of Historic Places
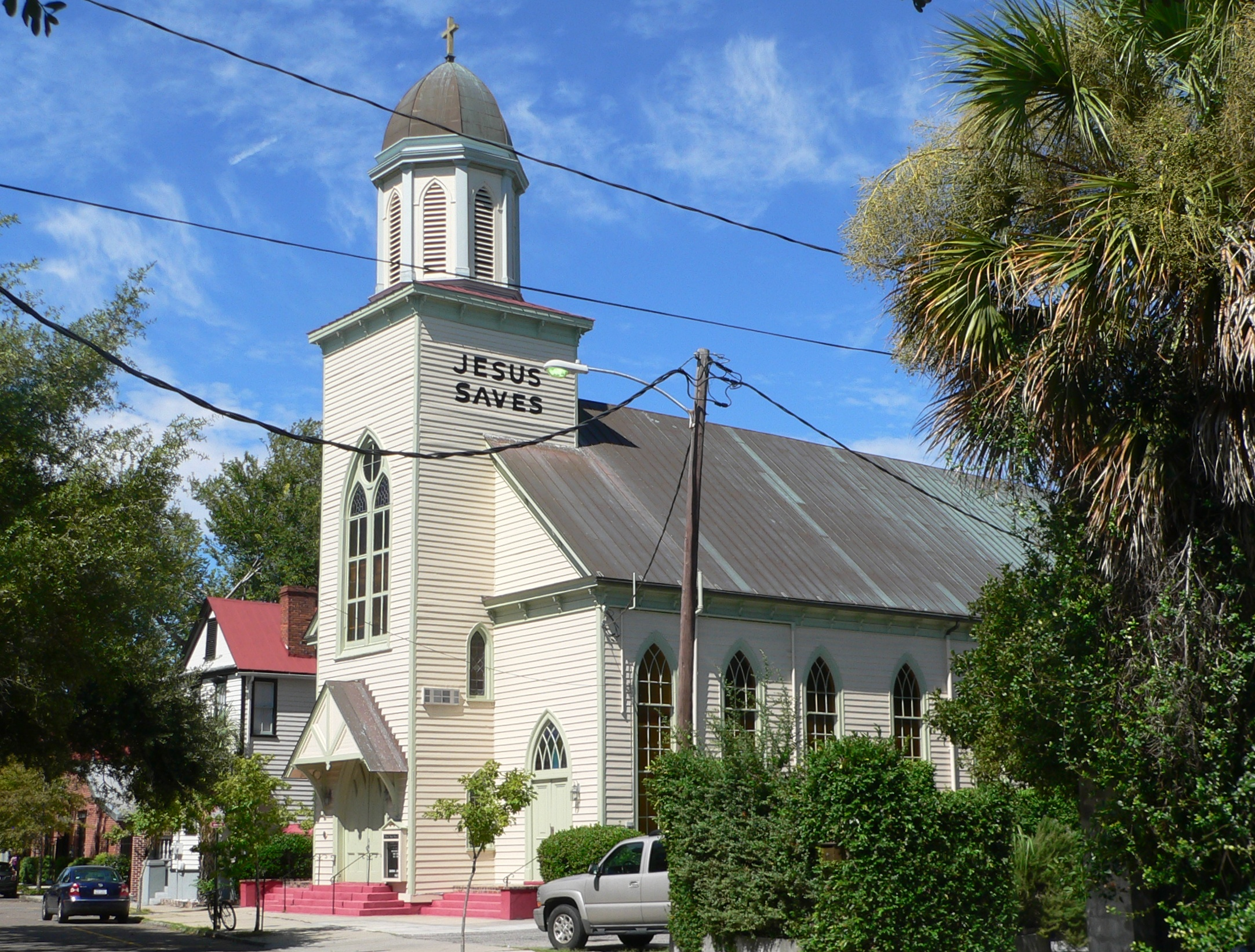
- Central Baptist Church, seen from the east

- Location within South Carolina Location within the United States
- Location: 26 Radcliffe St., Charleston, South Carolina
- Coordinates: 32°47′18″N 79°56′28″W
- Area: less than one acre
- Built: 1891
- Architect: Hutchinson, John P.
- Architectural style: Gothic, Carpenter Gothic
- NRHP reference No.: 77001217
- Added to NRHP: August 16, 1977

Central Baptist Church is a historic Southern Baptist church at 26 Radcliffe Street in Charleston, South Carolina. The Central Baptist Church was completed in 1893 and is considered the first church in Charleston founded and constructed entirely by African-Americans. The structure reflects Carpenter Gothic and Italianate influences and remains in excellent condition. Perhaps the most significant features of the structure are the large folk-art murals portraying biblical scenes including the Crucifixion, the Ascension, and the Resurrection of Christ which date back to 1915. Architect, John Pearson Hutchinson Sr., was hired as a negro carpenter, building contractor, and non-licensed architect. He was also a Deacon of the church. It was built in 1891 and added to the National Register in 1977.
