= Central Baptist Church (Honolulu) =

Coordinates: 21.308767°N 157.836632°W

Central Baptist Church (Honolulu, HI) is a Baptist Church in the Makiki neighborhood in the city of Honolulu. It is affiliated with the Southern Baptist Convention.

== History ==
Central Baptist Church was constituted on April 1, 1951. In 1971, the Hawaii Baptist Academy elementary school shared a building with Central Baptist Church until it acquired and moved to the former Sacred Heart Convent in Nuuanu in 1987.

Hawaii Baptist leader, Daniel Hen Chong Kong, pastored Central Baptist Church during his last years until retiring in Dec. 2004.

From 2008 to 2017, Shane Sowers served as Senior Pastor. Nelson Chapman, served as Senior Pastor from October 2017 to 2019. Kenneth Priest served as Transitional Pastor during 2021.

== Doctrinal Belief ==
On February 8, 2009, the 2000 Baptist Faith and Message was unanimously voted to replace the 1963 version as the church's articles of faith in the Church Constitution.

== Notable Members ==
- Dan Kong, former pastor
