= Calvary Baptist Church (Oklahoma City) =

Historic church in Oklahoma, United States

- U.S. National Register of Historic Places
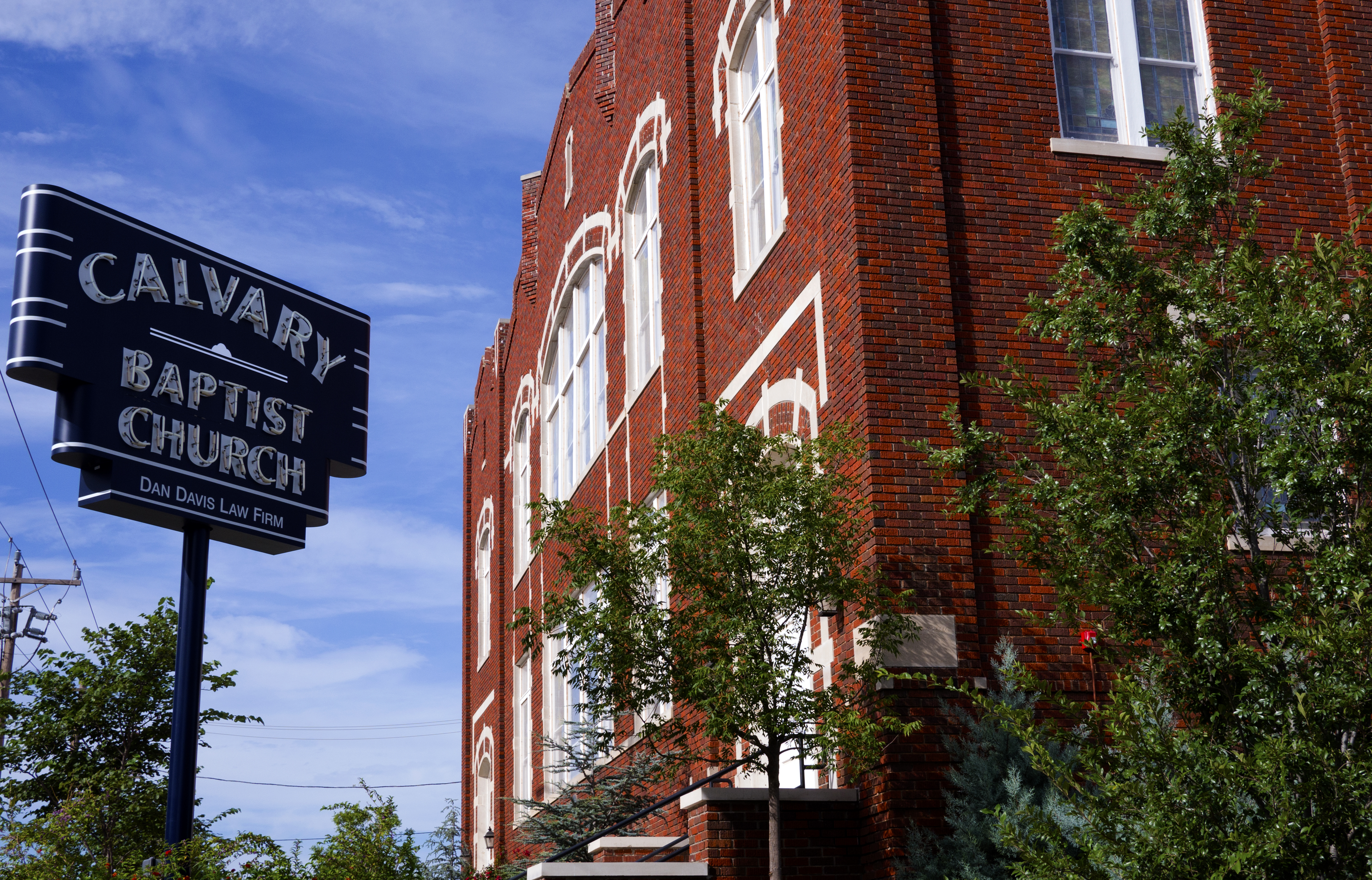

- Location within Oklahoma Location within the United States
- Location: 2nd and Walnut Sts., Oklahoma City, Oklahoma
- Coordinates: 35°28′11″N 97°30′30″W
- Area: 1 acre (0.40 ha)
- Built: 1921
- Built by: Russell Benton Bingham
- Architect: Russell Benton Bingham
- NRHP reference No.: 78002244
- Added to NRHP: December 19, 1978

Calvary Baptist Church (also known as Second Street Baptist Church; Saint Paul Baptist Church) is a historic Baptist church at 2nd and Walnut Streets in Oklahoma City, Oklahoma.

It was built in 1921 and added to the National Register in 1978. Martin Luther King Junior spoke in this church during the Civil rights movement. In 2012, Dan Davis Law purchased the building for office use and brought it back to its former life with more than $2,000,000 in renovations.
