= Severs Hotel =

- U.S. National Register of Historic Places
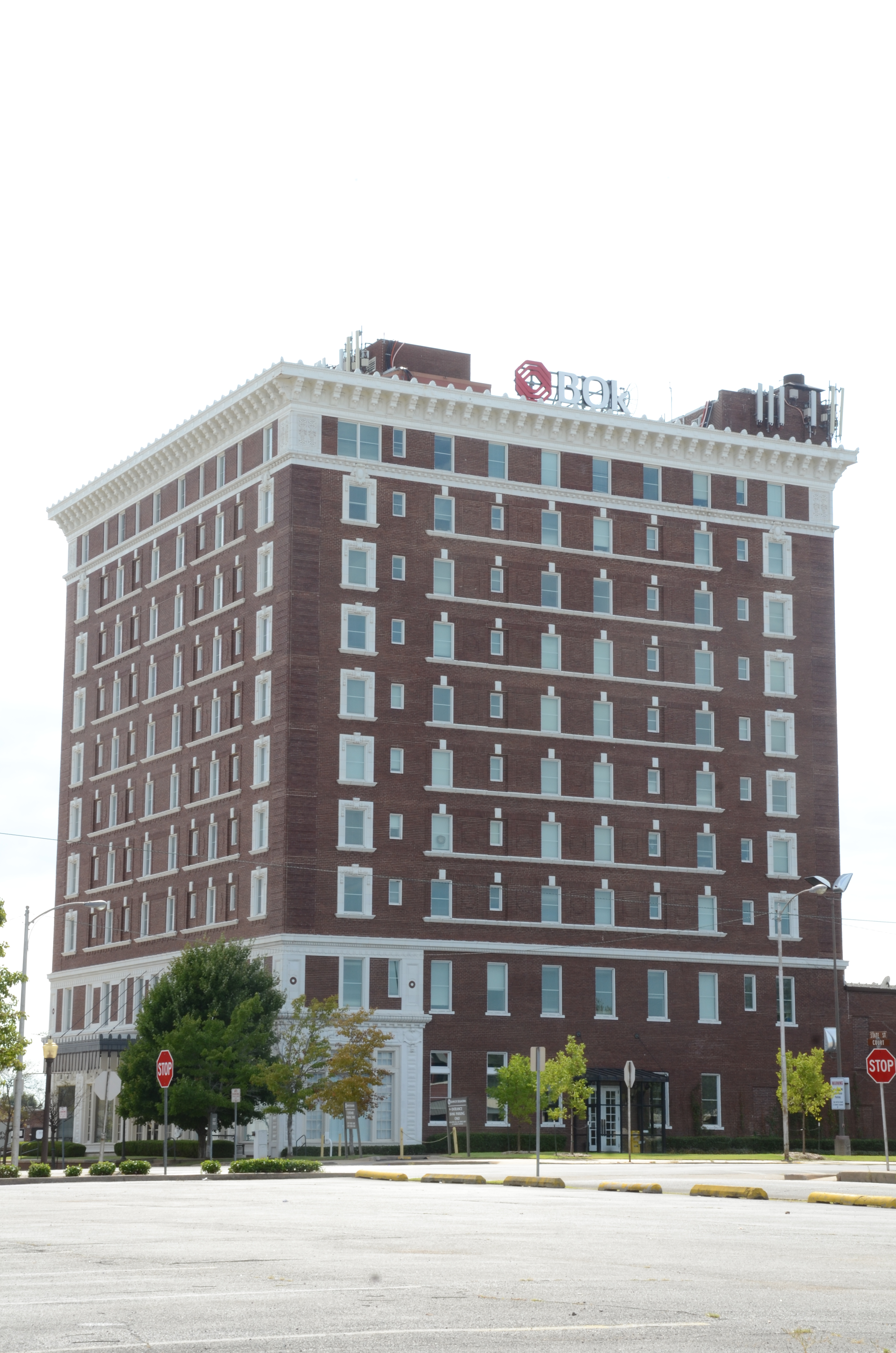
- Severs Hotel September 19, 2015. Courtesy Valis55

- Location within Oklahoma Location within the United States
- Location: 200 N. State St., Muskogee, Oklahoma
- Coordinates: 35°44′54.66″N 95°22′12.67″W
- Built: 1912
- Architect: Mariner & LaBeaume
- NRHP reference No.: 82003691
- Added to NRHP: September 12, 1982

The Severs Hotel in Muskogee, Oklahoma is one of five high-rises, ranging from five to ten stories tall, built in 1910–1912 and included in the Pre-Depression Muskogee Skyscrapers Thematic Resources study. The others are:

- Baltimore Hotel,
- Manhattan Building,
- Railroad Exchange Building, and
- Surety Building.

It was listed on the National Register of Historic Places in 1982.

== History ==
Frederick B. Severs (1835–1912) built the 10-story hotel in downtown Muskogee early in the 20th Century. He was a wealthy American Indian whose house had previously occupied the land where the hotel that was named for him was built. Construction actually began in 1911. Sadly, Severs did not live to see his hotel completed, since he died April 12, 1912. The grand opening was held on August 31, 1912. In October of that year, the renowned actress Sarah Bernhardt stayed at the Severs while she performed in a play, "Queen Elizabeth." Muskogee's Rotary Club chapter, chartered in November, 1913, met each Thursday at the Severs. In 1922, an exhibition major league baseball game between the New York Yankees and the Brooklyn Dodgers was played at Athletic Park in Muskogee. (Note: Athletic Park is now the site of the Muskogee Civic Center.) The Yankees chose to stay at the Severs Hotel because it was within walking distance of the ball park.

== Design and construction ==
This building was designed and constructed by Mariner & LaBeaume, an architectural firm of St. Louis. The architectural style is Sullivanesque. Its foundation, columns, beams and slabs are of reinforced concrete. The building also has a basement. The exterior walls are covered with three layers of red brick, totaling 12 inches (30 cm) thickness. The building has a decorative metal cornice that is 4 feet (1.2 m) high and has a 3 foot (0.91 m) overhang.

After it opened, the Severs Hotel was considered the finest hotel in the Southwestern United States. It had 216 rooms, 146 of which had private bathrooms, rather uncommon at that time. Among its amenities was a chilled water plant that circulated ice water to all of the rooms. The kitchen had an electric refrigeration system, also considered unique at that time and place.
