= Baltimore Hotel (Muskogee, Oklahoma) =

Structure in Muskogee, Oklahoma

Coordinates: 35.7486°N 95.3721°W

The Baltimore Hotel in Muskogee, Oklahoma is one of five skyscraper buildings, ranging from five to ten stories tall, built in 1910–1912 and included in the Pre-Depression Muskogee Skyscrapers Thematic Resources study. The others are:

- Manhattan Building (Muskogee, Oklahoma),
- Railroad Exchange Building,
- Severs Hotel, and
- Surety Building.

The Baltimore Hotel was eligible for listing on the National Register of Historic Places, but its owner objected so the nomination was withdrawn, while the other four buildings were listed.

== Building design ==
The Baltimore Hotel was constructed in 1910, and cost about $115,000. The design was called Chicago Commercial, so it lacks the Sullivan-style features of the other four buildings in this submission. Its clientele primarily catered to visiting businessmen and government personnel.
