= Railway Exchange Building (Muskogee, Oklahoma) =

- Railroad Exchange Building
- U.S. National Register of Historic Places
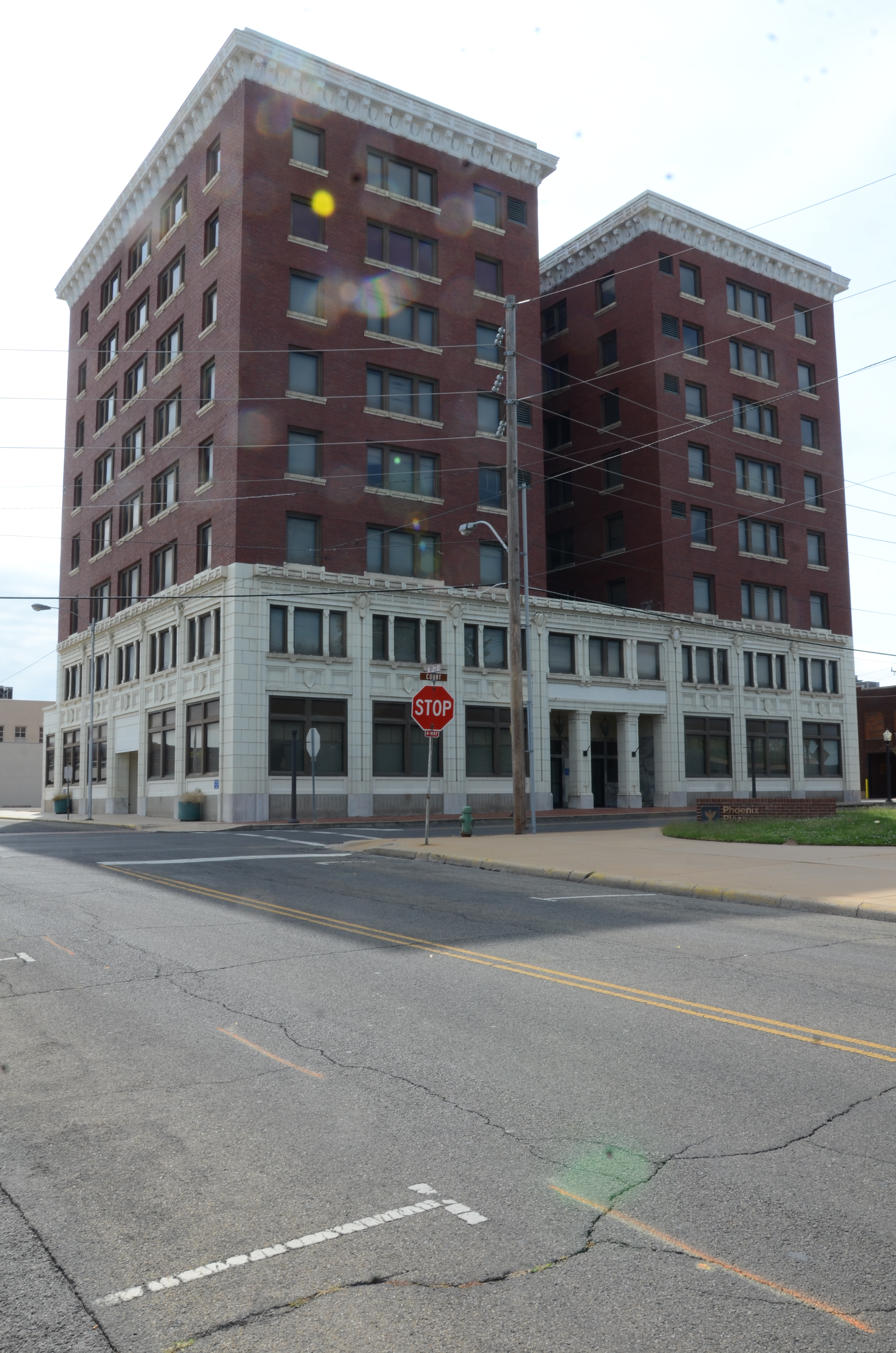

- Location within Oklahoma Location within the United States
- Location: 201 Court St., Muskogee, Oklahoma
- Coordinates: 35°44′58.92″N 95°22′10.41″W
- Architectural style: Chicago
- MPS: Pre-Depression Muskogee Skyscrapers TR
- NRHP reference No.: 83002096
- Added to NRHP: August 11, 1983

The Railway Exchange Building in Muskogee, Oklahoma is one of five skyscraper buildings, ranging from five to ten stories tall, built before 1912 and is listed in the National Register of Historic Places as part of the Pre-Depression Muskogee Skyscrapers Thematic Resources study. The others are:

- Baltimore Hotel,
- Manhattan Building,
- Severs Hotel, and
- Surety Building.

This building is located at the corner of Second and Court Streets in downtown Muskogee.

== Architecture ==
This building shares certain characteristics with the others listed above. Its architecture represents the Chicago School of architectural design:

- It has a rectangular shape;
- It is flat roofed;
- It has a two-story base with large display windows;
- Upper story windows are arranged in vertical bands, separated by pilaster-styled mullions;
- Red brick and masonry appear throughout the building.

== Notable tenants ==
The 8-story Railway Exchange Building was built to house railway company offices. Later, it was used for offices of Muskogee County, Oklahoma. By February 1983, when the application for listing on the National Register of Historic Places (NRHP) was submitted, it was owned by the State of Oklahoma, which used it as an office building. It also housed Connors State College before the school moved to Northeastern State University’s Muskogee campus on Shawnee Bypass. A news article in 2012 indicated that the building had been vacated in December 2011.

== Status ==
Plans to renovate this historic building for another purpose have been put on indefinite hold in 2016, because the state has discontinued making such grants for such renovations due to its budget shortfall.
