= Chalmers Ballong Corps =

Hot-air ballooning club in Sweden

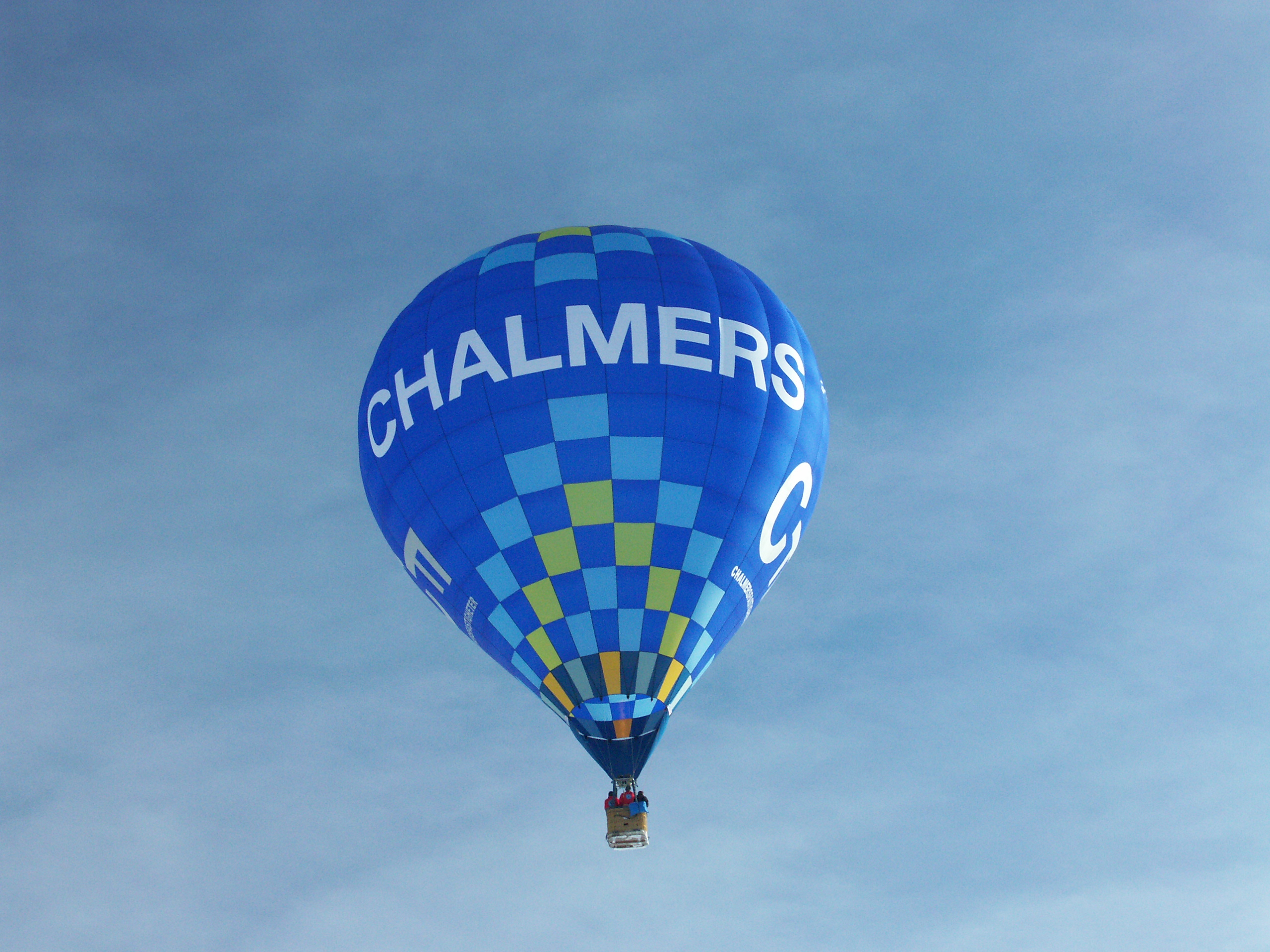
One of CBC's balloons

Chalmers Ballong Corps (CBC) is a students' hot-air ballooning club at Chalmers University of Technology in Gothenburg, Sweden. (The word Ballong is Swedish for Balloon.)

The society was founded in 1976 and has since become one of the largest and most active ballooning clubs in Sweden.
