= Children's Book Council =

Children's Book Council may refer to:

- Children's Book Council (United States)
- Children's Book Council of Australia
- Children's Book Council of Iran
