= Central Baptist Church (Muskogee, Oklahoma) =

Historic church in Oklahoma, United States

- U.S. National Register of Historic Places
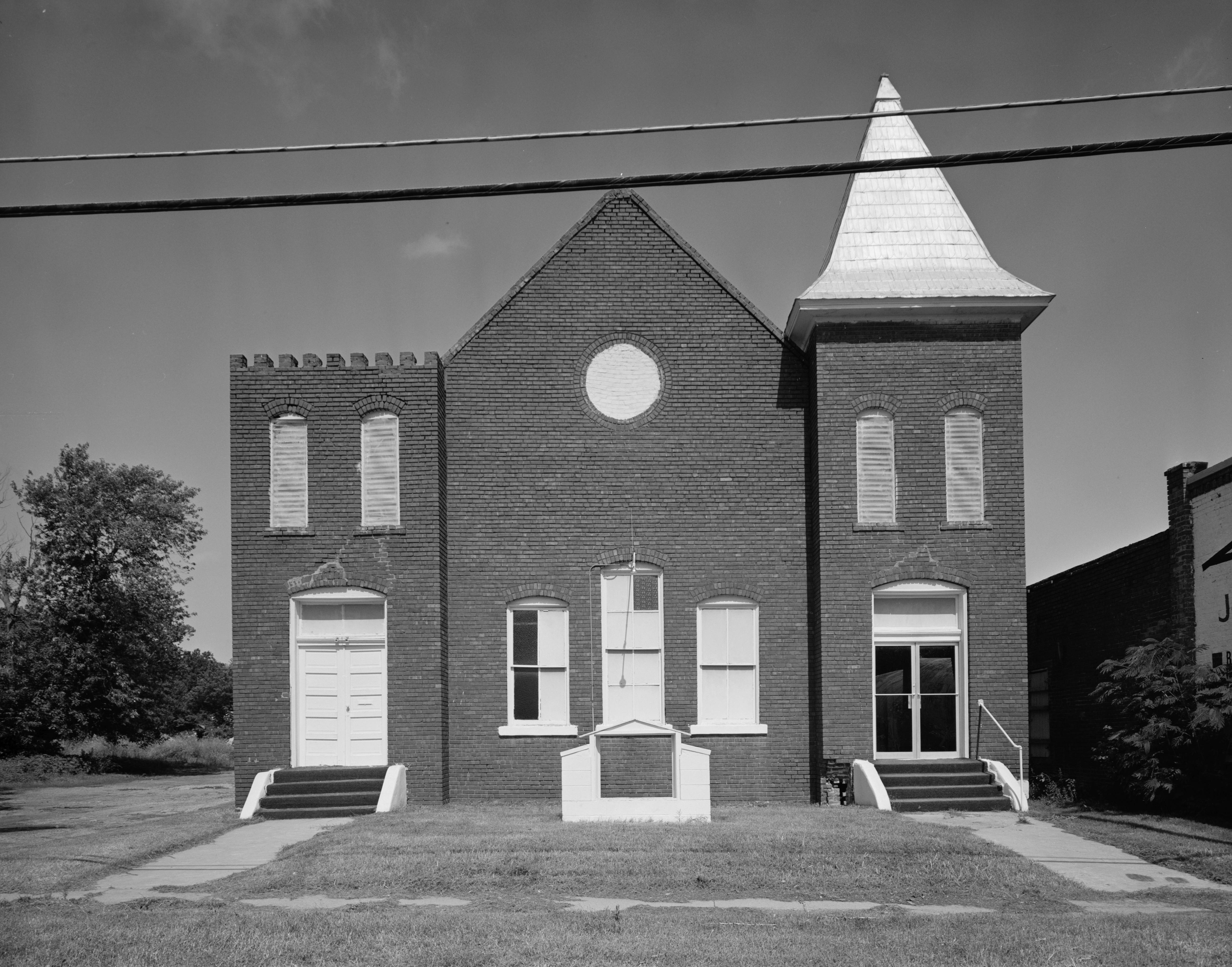

- Location within Oklahoma Location within the United States
- Location: 515 N. 4th St., Muskogee, Oklahoma
- Coordinates: 35°45′12″N 95°22′12″W
- Area: less than one acre
- Built: 1908
- MPS: Black Protestant Churches of Muskogee TR
- NRHP reference No.: 84003157
- Added to NRHP: September 25, 1984

The Central Baptist Church at 515 N. 4th Street in Muskogee, Oklahoma was a historic Baptist church building. It was built in 1908 and added to the National Register of Historic Places in 1984.

The building was demolished in 1985 for Arrowhead Mall.

It was a 40 by 95 feet (12 m × 29 m) one-story building with a hipped roof and two-story towers at north and south ends of its east-facing front. It was listed on the National Register as part of a multiple property submission for Black Protestant churches in Muskogee.
