= Marlon Coleman =

Mayor of Muskogee, Oklahoma, United States

50th Mayor of Muskogee, Oklahoma
- In office July 6, 2020 – April 9, 2024
- Deputy: Derrick Reed
- Preceded by: Janey Cagle-Boydston
- Succeeded by: Patrick Cale

Muskogee City Councilor for the 4th Ward
- In office 2014–2020

Personal details
- Born: Marlon Joseph Coleman; March 23, 1972 (age 54) New Orleans, Louisiana , U.S.
- Party: Republican
- Education: University of Phoenix (MBA) Andersonville Theological Seminary (Th.D)

Marlon Joseph Coleman (born March 23, 1972) is an American politician, civil servant, and Baptist minister from Louisiana who served as the 50th mayor of Muskogee, Oklahoma, from July 6, 2020 to April 9, 2024. A member of the Republican Party, Coleman is the first African American to be elected Mayor of Muskogee. Prior to becoming mayor, he served as a city councilor for Muskogee's fourth ward between 2014 and 2020.

== Early life and education ==
Marlon Joseph Coleman was born in New Orleans when his mother was 17 and grew up in the 9th Ward of New Orleans. He was raised by a single mother, until she married his stepfather when he was four. His step father was physically abusive and Coleman and his two siblings would frequently stay with their grandparents. In his youth, Coleman would drag race in New Orleans, but he cites the death of his grandfather as motivating him to turn his life around.

He attended the Andersonville Theological Seminary, obtaining in Doctor of Theology, and later the University of Phoenix obtaining a Master's in Business Administration.

== Early career ==
Coleman spent 22 years working for the Federal Government, with both the United States Department of Agriculture and the United States Department of Veterans Affairs.

Coleman first started preaching while living in New Orleans at the Pleasant Valley Church.

== Move to Muskogee ==
Coleman moved to Muskogee, Oklahoma in 2010. He became the full-time pastor of Antioch Church in Muskogee in 2011. Coleman was the president of the Neighbors Building Neighborhoods of Muskogee, Oklahoma from 2017 to 2018. In 2019, Coleman was recognized as an associate dean during the 2019 National Baptist Congress.

== Muskogee politics ==
=== City Council ===
Coleman announced his candidacy for the Muskogee City Council fourth ward in November 2013. He faced Dean Swan and Claressa Vealy-Dyer in the general election to succeed retiring city councilor Kenny Payne. Marlon Coleman won the election for the fourth ward with 87% percent of the vote. He served as a city councilor for the fourth ward for six years.

=== Mayor of Muskogee ===
==== Campaigns ====
Coleman started his campaign for mayor in late in 2019, facing off against six opponents, including then incumbent mayor Janey Cagle-Boydston. During the 2020 mayoral elections, Coleman drew criticism for refusing to release information regarding financial contributions to his campaign. He received 39% of the vote on election day, which forced a runoff with the runner up. Coleman won the runoff election against Wayne Divelbiss, receiving 59% of the vote, making Coleman the first African-American mayor elected in Muskogee.

Prior to his mayoral re-election campaign, Coleman registered as a member of the Republican Party. Coleman was reelected as mayor during the 2021-2022 elections receiving 85% of the vote, the largest such victory in the city's history.

On July 21, 2023 Marlon Coleman told the Muskogee Phoenix he does not plan on seeking third term as Mayor of Muskogee. Coleman announced he would be starting as a teacher for Hilldale Public Schools. Coleman's Mayoral term expired in April 2024.

==== Tenure as Mayor of Muskogee ====
Coleman was sworn in as Muskogee's 50th mayor on July 6, 2020, at the Muskogee Civic Center. He made several promises during his inauguration, including to improve Muskogee's image, repair the city's infrastructure, and create better partnerships between the city's public school districts.

===== Healthcare =====
In January 2020, the Muskogee Medical Healthcare Authority (MMHA) sued the Saint Francis Health system for failure to make payments under the 30-year lease agreement signed with the MMHA. In March 2022, a settlement between the City of Muskogee, MMHA and the Saint Francis Health system was reached. Saint Francis agreed to make a capital investment of $150 million into Saint Francis Hospital Muskogee. The addition will increase the size of the Saint Francis Hospital by 125 news beds and will hold a new Chapel. The Office of the Mayor and the Muskogee City Council appoint members to the MMHA governing board, on which Deputy Mayor Derrick Reed serves.

===== Public safety =====
The City of Muskogee has faced several high-profile mass shootings and crimes during Mayor Coleman's tenure.

- The 2021 Muskogee shooting left six dead and one injured. During a news conference following the incident Marlon Coleman described it as "the worst tragedy Muskogee has ever seen". He would go on to sign a proclamation making March the "Community Care for First Responders Month" in honor of the first responders who responded to the shooting.
- In 2022, the Tulsa Police Department notified the Muskogee Police Department that the preparator of the 2022 Tulsa hospital shooting had a bomb rigged at his home in Muskogee. However police did not find any explosive devices on the property. Coleman would later call upon the United States Congress to pass legislation to reduce gun violence during a public speech.
- In 2023, The in-laws and brother-in law of famous NASCAR driver Jimmie Johnson were slain in a triple Murder-Suicide.

In 2023, Coleman announced his intention to pass a bond measure to fund a new City Hall and Police Station.

===== Housing =====
In August 2022, Coleman announced that the city had secured a deal with Shaz Investment Group LLC to build 40 new market-rate houses in Muskogee.

In February 2023, Mayor Coleman and the Port of Muskogee announced a new $10,000 stipend program to help move three new families to the city with the possibility of funding for up to twenty new families.

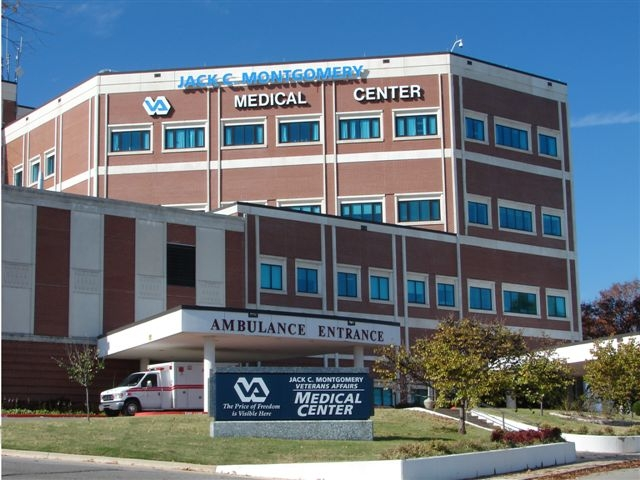
Jack C. Montgomery VA Medical Center in Muskogee, Oklahoma

===== Veterans Affairs =====
On March 14, 2022 officials from the United States Department of Veterans Affairs (VA) sent a report to the Veterans Affairs Asset and Infrastructure Review Commission (AIR Commission) recommending the closing of the Jack C Montgomery Veterans Medical Center in Muskogee, Oklahoma. The reported recommend that the VA Hospital were to close and patients to be transferred to a new VA facility in Tulsa. Muskogee Mayor Marlon Coleman lobbied heavily against the closure of the facility.

On June 22, 2022, the United States Senate Committee on Veterans' Affairs announced that the VA Medical Center in Muskogee will remain open.

===== 2022 ethics complaint =====
During the 2021-2022 Mayoral Election, Coleman was subject to a ethics complaint from City Councilor Traci McGee. The complaint alleged that Coleman violated Oklahoma Ethics Commission rules on two separate promotional flyer campaigns. Following an investigation, City Attorney Roy Tucker stated that one of the flyers may have violated Oklahoma Ethics Commission rules. Following the investigation, the City Council decided to not move forward with any formal actions against Mayor Coleman.

===== City charter reform =====
During the 2020 Mayoral run-off election, City Councilor Tracey Cole formed a ballot initiative to repeal the 1971 Muskogee City Charter and switch the City Government structure to a statutory Mayor–council government Coleman (at this time a mayoral candidate) cautioned voters against the proposal citing his concerns regarding the city's ward voting system and the addition of a pay scale for elected officials. Later in the election cycle, Coleman claimed that the ballot initiative was ultimately too divisive and would distract voters from progress. The ballot initiative failed to pass, with 70% of voters opposing the ballot question.

== Electoral history ==
2020 Mayoral Election
Candidate	Percent of the Electorate
Marlon Coleman	39.63%
Wayne Divelbiss	29.91%
Janey Cagle-Boydston	23.66%
Tracey Cole	5.25%
John Lowrimore	1.56%

2020 Mayoral Runoff Election
Candidate	Votes Tallied	Percent of the Electorate
Marlon Coleman	3,974	59.15%
Wayne Divelbiss	2,745	40.85%

2021 Mayoral Election
Candidate	Votes Tallied	Percent of the Electorate
Marlon Coleman	3,089	85.4%
Traci McGee	525	15.6%

== See also ==
- John Tyler Hammons
- Muskogee County, Oklahoma
- List of first African-American mayors
