= History of Muskogee =

The history of Muskogee refers to the history of the region in which the city of Muskogee, Oklahoma now lies. Muskogee's history begins before its official incorporation in 1898. Prior to becoming an incorporated city, it was named in honor of the Creek Nation in the 19th century. It was opened to white settlers with the Land Run.

Ohio native Charles N. Haskell helped establish the city as a major economic hub in eastern Oklahoma in the 20th century. Today, with a population of over 38,000, it is the eleventh largest city in the state.

== 19th century ==
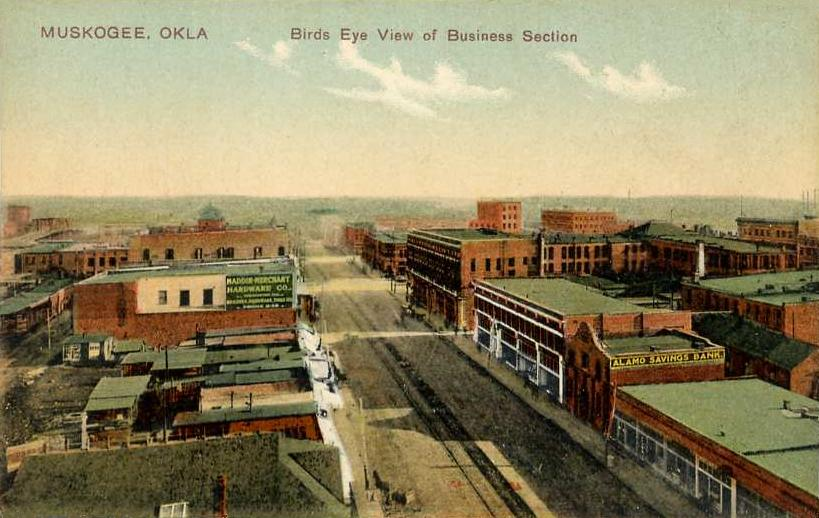
Business section c. 1910

Muskogee first received recognition when in 1805 US President Thomas Jefferson addressed the United States Congress seconding the recommendation of Meriwether Lewis that a trading post be established near the modern day city. French fur traders had already existed in the area for some time before the American acquisition of the Louisiana Purchase. The French were believed to have established a temporary village near Muskogee in 1806, but the first permanent settlement was established in 1817 on the south bank of the Verdigris River, north of Muskogee.

After the passage of the Indian Removal Act of 1830, the Five Civilized Tribes were relocated from their homes in the south to Indian Territory through the Trail of Tears. Of the five tribes, the Cherokee and Creek tribes established settlements near Muskogee, with the town being incorporated into both Indian Nations.

Following the American Civil War, renewed interest was created in western expansion. The United States Federal government allowed railroads to be built on Indian soil for the first time. In 1872, the Missouri-Kansas-Texas Railroad was extended to this area. In 1889, recognizing Muskogee's growing economic and political value, a United States federal court was established at the city. This was the first federal court that exercised jurisdiction in Indian Territory that was actually located within the Territory. Before this point, all jurisdiction had been given to the federal court located in Fort Smith, Arkansas until 1883 when jurisdiction was split between that court and the federal courts for the District of Kansas at Wichita & Fort Scott and the Northern District of Texas at Graham and later the Eastern District of Texas at Paris.

With the establishment of a federal court, Indian Territory was opened to white settlers via land runs. The town was incorporated on March 19, 1898.

== 20th century ==
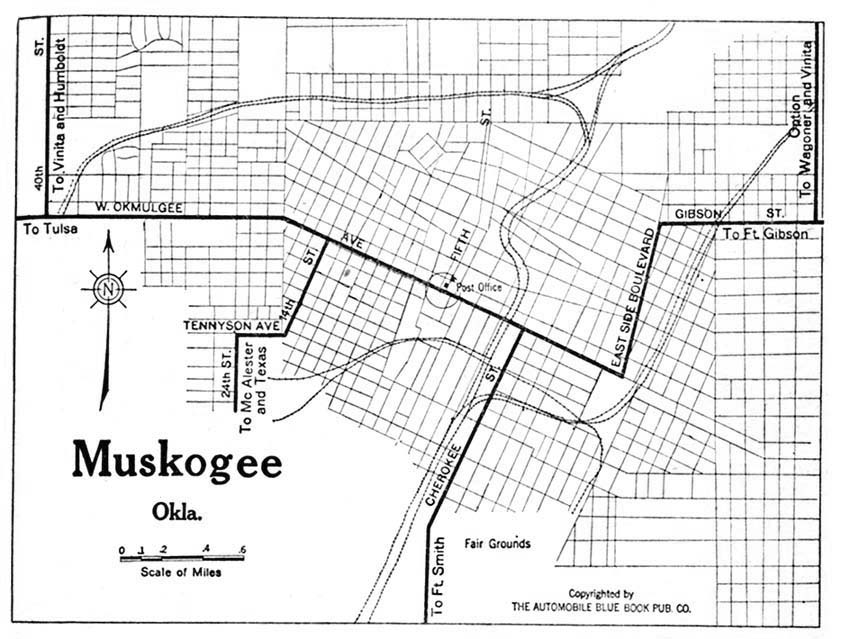
Map of Muskogee in 1920

Even though Muskogee sat at the intersection of three rivers and offered vast fertile farm lands, the town remained relatively quiet for the first years following its founding. In 1900, the town had a population of 4,254

Muskogee made a turn towards prominence when an Ohio native, Charles N. Haskell moved to the city. When Haskell arrived in March 1901, he found it a quiet town of over four thousand people. Haskell helped the town grow to a population of more than 25,000 inhabitants.

Haskell built the first five-story business block in Oklahoma Territory. He organized and built most of the railroads running into that city. He built and owned fourteen brick buildings in the city. Through his influence, Muskogee grew to be a center of business and industry in a matter of years. Haskell often told others that he hoped Muskogee would become the "Queen City of the Southwest."

A franchise for electric streetcars was awarded to the Muskogee Electric Traction Company May 14, 1904. Operations began March 15, 1905, expanding over a period of years to 31 track miles in 1916, but starting about 1922 began to decline, until abandonment March 9, 1933. [6]

Many of Muskogee's streets in the downtown district still show their original brick composition. Buildings dating back to the Haskell era abut modern architecture.

As Muskogee's economic and business importance grew, so did its political power. When the Civilized Tribes met together in order to propose an Indian State, the State of Sequoyah, they met on August 21, 1905, in Muskogee to draft its constitution, with Muskogee to serve as the State's capital. Vetoed by US President Theodore Roosevelt, the proposed State of Sequoyah did not receive federal recognition. Instead, the State of Oklahoma was admitted to the Union on November 16, 1907, as the 46th State.

Tenant farmers in Muskogee were displaced in great numbers during the Great Depression. The collapse of cotton prices led to the 1933 Agricultural Adjustment Act, which led landowners to evict tenant farmers as they took land out of production to receive farm subsidies. That same year, thousands of displaced tenant farmers helped kick off the Okie migration to California.

Despite the New Deal, the area didn't recover economically until the military build-up preceding World War II.

== 21st century ==
By the 21st century, Muskogee was an economic center for eastern Oklahoma with a population of more than 38,000. The city has operated the Port of Muskogee, which is accessible from the Gulf of Mexico.

In May 2008, the city elected one of the youngest mayors in American history, John Tyler Hammons.
