= Muskogee =

Muskogee or Muscogee can refer to:

== Peoples and languages ==
- Muscogee, or Muscogee Creek, a group of related Indigenous peoples of the United States
- Muscogee Nation, a Native American tribe based in the US state of Oklahoma
- Muskogean languages, a language family a language family spoken in the Southeastern United States
  - Muscogee language, spoken by Muscogee and Seminole people

== Places in the United States ==
- Muscogee, Florida, a ghost town
- Muskogee, Oklahoma, a city
  - The City of Muskogee
  - Muskogee County, Oklahoma
- Muscogee County, Georgia
- State of Muskogee, a proclaimed nation in Florida declared by William Augustus Bowles in 1799

== Other uses ==
- USS Muskogee, a warship in WW2
