= The City of Muskogee =

Governance of city in Oklahoma, U.S.

City of Muskogee
- Council-Manager
- Logo of the City of Muskogee
- Formation: March 16, 1898
- City Charter: Muskogee City Charter
- Website: muskogeeonline.org

Legislative branch
- Legislature: City Council
- Mayor: Patrick Cale
- City Clerk: Tammy Tracy

Executive branch
- City Manager: Mike Miller
- Appointed by: the Muskogee City Council
- Headquarters: Muskogee Municipal Building

Judicial branch
- Court: Muskogee Municipal Court
- City Attorney: Katrina Bodenhamer

The City of Muskogee is governed by a city manager, mayor and a city council under the council–manager form of local government. The governing document of Muskogee, Oklahoma is the City Charter of Muskogee.

== Mayor and city council ==
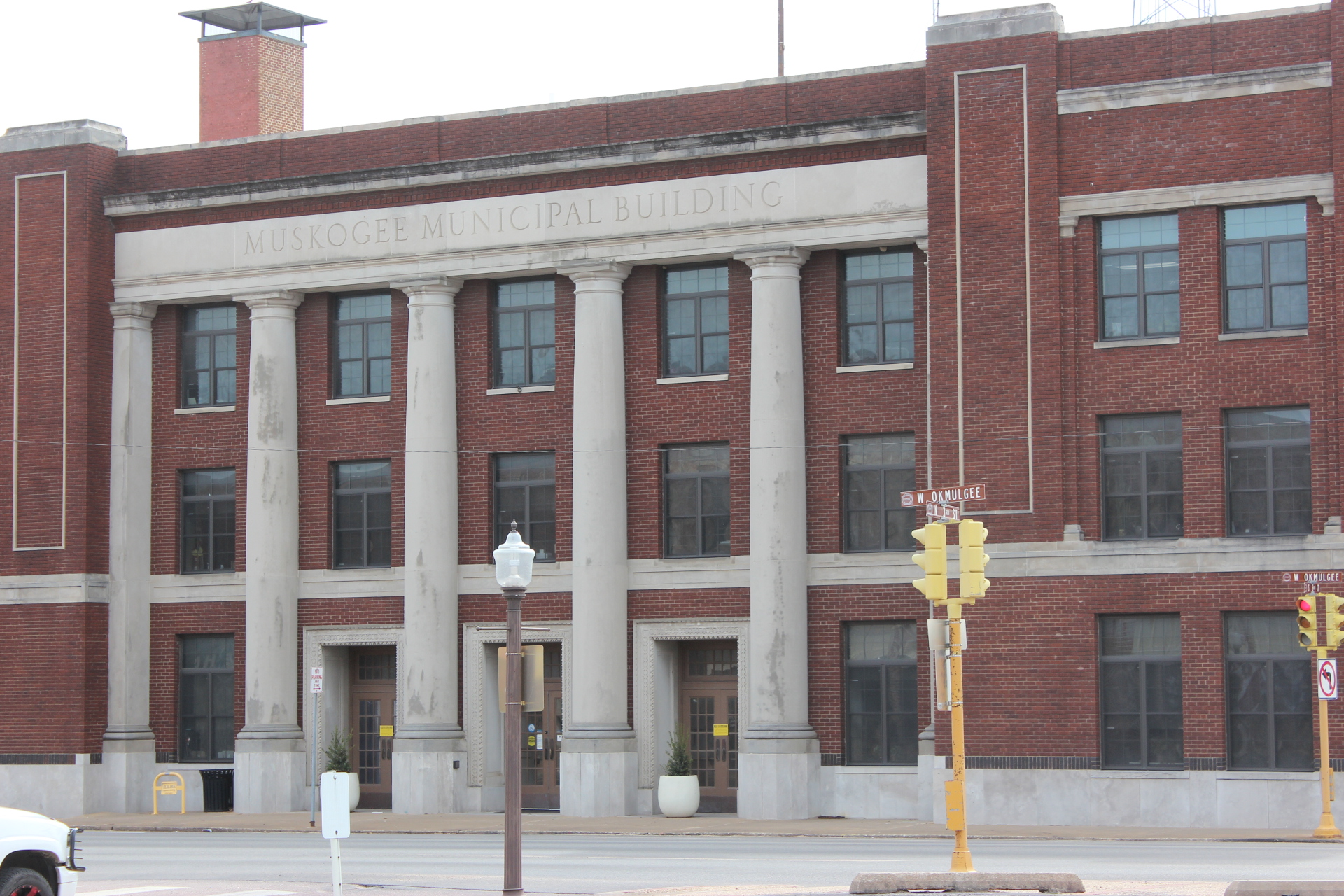
Muskogee Municipal Building, main office of the City of Muskogee

The city is divided into four wards with each ward being represented by two members of the council. Each member is elected by the city as a whole, but must reside in the ward they represent. Elections are held on the first Tuesday in April in each even numbered year. The next election will be held in April, 2010. All elections are non-partisan and the Mayor and the members of the Council receive no salary or compensation for their services.

The Mayor is the head of the city for all ceremonial purposes and, by Oklahoma state law, the Governor of Oklahoma must recognize the Mayor as the city commander for the purposes of martial law. The Mayor serves as chair of the Council, presides over all meetings, and has a full vote on all matters. The Council elects one of its members to serve as Vice Mayor who becomes the Mayor in the event of a vacancy in the office of Mayor. The Mayor, with the approval of the Council, appoints members to city boards and commissions and, during a state of emergency, assumes emergency powers.

John Tyler Hammons, who, at the time of his election, was a 19-year-old University of Oklahoma freshman. Mayor Hammons was first elected, with 70% of the vote, on May 13, 2008, in an election against former Muskogee Mayor Hershel McBride. Hammons was elected to a second term on April 6, 2010, serving until 2012.

In July 2020, Marlon Coleman became the first African-American mayor of Muskogee, earning 59.1% of the vote

The Vice Mayor will be determined at a later date

The current members of the City Council of Muskogee are:

- Mayor
  - Patrick Cale
- Ward I
  - Shirley Hilton-Flannery
  - Mike Brawley
- Ward II
  - Jaime Stout
  - Dan Hall
- Ward III
  - Derrick A. Reed
  - Melody Cranford
- Ward IV
  - Tracy Hoos II
  - Tom Martindale

== City manager and administration ==
The city manager serves as the chief administrative officer of Muskogee and is appointed by the city council. The current City Manager is Mike Miller.

Among the City Manager’s top level executives and departments are:

- Emergency Management Department – headed by Emergency Management Director, responsible for informing the citizens of Muskogee about emergency preparedness and how to minimize the effects of technological and natural disasters upon the people of Muskogee by preparing implementing and exercising preparedness plans, and coordinating actual disaster response/recovery operations
- Engineering Department – headed by City Engineer, responsible for overseeing all construction related to Muskogee’s infrastructure and managing all city mapping
  - Water, Sewage and Sanitation Departments – under authority of City Engineer, responsible for providing water to city and water treatment services
- Finance Department – headed by City Treasurer, responsible for managing Muskogee’s financial resources through monitoring financial activity against the city's budget, initiating and recording all investment activity, preparing financial statements and scheduling for audits
- Fire Department – headed by Fire Chief, responsible for providing emergency services in response to fires and other emergencies
- Cemetery Department – headed by Cemetery Supervisor, responsible for the regulation and management of the city cemetery, Greenhill Cemetery
- Information Technology Department – headed by Information Technology Director, responsible for providing data processing services to city departments, agencies, and offices, including technical support
- Parks and Recreation Department – headed by Parks and Recreation Director, responsible for providing and managing city recreational facilities and programs
- Personnel Department – headed by Personnel Director, responsible for ensuring citywide employment needs are met and protecting the city’s merit program
- Planning Department – headed by Planning Director, responsible for developing, revising and administering the zoning and subdivision regulations for new development and new construction within the limits of the city and well as enforcing all city ordinances in reference to derelict structures, dilapidated property, accumulation of weeds, grass and trash, care of premises, off-street parking and zoning violations
- Muskogee Police Department – headed by Chief of Police, responsible for crime reduction, preservation of the public peace, and responding to other emergencies that threaten the public safety
- Public Works Department – headed by the Public Works Director, responsible for providing customer service to the City in the areas of Streets, Storm Water, Environmental Control, Traffic, Sanitation, Recycling and the city Airport
- Purchasing Department – headed by City Purchasing Agent, responsible for coordinating a uniform procurement system to supply city operations with an uninterrupted flow of materials and services

Other important city officials that are supervised by the City Manager but are appointed by the mayor and City Council are the City Attorney, Katrina Bodenhamer, who heads the Legal Department which is responsible for representing the City in all legal matters, including court, contracts, authorities, boards and public trusts, and the City Clerk, Tammy L. Tracy, who is responsible for keeping all records of the city as well as the minutes of the all Council meetings, authorities, boards and public trusts, and publishing agendas.
