= Hilldale =

Hilldale may refer to:

- Hilldale, Lancashire, a village in West Lancashire, England
- Hilldale, Missouri, United States
- Hilldale, Pennsylvania, United States
- Hilldale, Virginia, United States
- Hilldale, West Virginia, United States
- Hilldale Club, a Negro league baseball team based in Darby, Pennsylvania, United States
  - Hilldale Park, a former ballpark and home field of the Hilldale Club
- Hilldale Public Schools, an independent school district in Muskogee, Oklahoma, United States
- Hilldale railway station, on the North Coast line in New South Wales, Australia
- Hilldale Shopping Center, a shopping center in Madison, Wisconsin, United States
- a fictional neighborhood of the town of Hill Valley in the film trilogy Back to the Future

== See also ==
- Hildale, Utah
