= 2022 Tulsa hospital shooting =

Mass shooting in Oklahoma, U.S.

- Location: 36.07001°N 95.91986°W; Tulsa, Oklahoma, U.S.
- Date: June 1, 2022 (CDT)
- Target: Dr. Preston Philips
- Attack type: Mass shooting, mass murder, murder-suicide
- Weapons: AR-15 style rifle; .40-caliber Smith & Wesson semi-automatic handgun
- Deaths: 5 (including the perpetrator)
- Injuries: Unspecified
- Perpetrator: Michael Louis
- Motive: Revenge for post-surgery pain

On June 1, 2022, Michael Louis opened fire in the Natalie Building, part of the Saint Francis Hospital in Tulsa, Oklahoma, United States. He killed four people, three of whom were hospital staff, and injured an unspecified number of others before committing suicide.

== Shooting ==
The shooting reportedly occurred on the building's second floor, in the orthopedic facility, with the victims being both staff members and patients. Louis had entered the building through a second-floor entrance from the parking garage that was open to the public. Law enforcement received a call of a person with a firearm in the Natalie Medical Building on Saint Francis Hospital campus, at around 4:56 p.m. Responding officers to the scene heard shots in the building and moved toward the second floor. Officers believe the last shot was fired around 4:58 p.m., and as they were moving towards the shooter's location while calling out "Tulsa police", they heard the final gunshot.

The Tulsa Police Department confirmed just before 5:00 p.m. CDT that the shooter was killed by what they believed to be a self-inflicted gunshot wound. The Tulsa Police Department notified the Muskogee Police Department that a bomb may have been placed in a residential area in Muskogee.

A total of 37 spent bullet casings were found at the crime scene.

== Victims ==
Four people were killed, and an unspecified number were injured in the shooting. The fatalities were Dr. Preston John Phillips, 59, Dr. Stephanie Jolene Husen, 48, Medical Assistant Amanda Dawn Glenn, 40, and the husband of a patient, William Lee Love, 73.

== Perpetrator ==
The gunman was identified as 45-year-old Michael Louis (also known as Michelet Louis) of Muskogee (born December 1976). Police said he was armed with a semi-automatic pistol and an AR-15-style firearm, which were reportedly purchased on May 29 and June 1, respectively. Louis was formerly a resident of Newark, New Jersey, before moving to Oklahoma in the mid-2010s, and had previously lived in a few other cities across the country including Fort Smith, Arkansas, Rochester, New York, and Philadelphia, Pennsylvania.

On June 2, the Chief of the Tulsa Police Department, Wendell Franklin, stated that Louis had undergone back surgery with Phillips and had suffered from pain since the operation. Phillips previously performed surgery on Louis on May 19, and Louis blamed Phillips for his continued pain post-surgery. Between the surgery and the shooting, he had called the office several times seeking relief from the pain. A letter, which officials said was found on Louis, said that, while Phillips was the target of the shooting, others "who got in his way" would also be killed.

== Aftermath ==
Multiple methods of fundraising for the victims and their families were created shortly after the shooting. The Tulsa Community Foundation has a Saint Francis Employee Emergency Fund, and a GoFundMe was created for at least one of the victims.

== Responses ==
Oklahoma Governor Kevin Stitt called the shooting "a senseless act of violence and hatred." Tulsa Mayor G. T. Bynum expressed "profound gratitude" for the "broad range of first responders who did not hesitate today to respond to this act of violence."

Captain Richard Meulenberg of the Tulsa Police Department described the attack as deliberate, saying, "It wasn't random," and that "This wasn't an individual who just decided he wanted to go find a hospital full of random people. He deliberately made a choice to come here and his actions were deliberate."

Many physicians, especially black orthopedic surgeons, expressed their sorrow for Phillips' death. Many touched upon the concern that other physicians have felt over the years due to threats by patients. The former president of the J.R. Gladden Society, a national organization of orthopedic physicians of color claimed the attack was a part of practicing medicine and that 99% of doctors across the country would report being threatened, having to fire patients, get restraining orders, or carry concealed for protection. Additional concerns have been raised by a study from National Nurses United which concluded that based on "countless acts of assault, battery, aggression, and threats of violence that routinely take place in health care settings....a frightening trend of increasing violence face by health care workers throughout the country."

== See also ==
- Gun violence in the United States
- List of mass shootings in the United States in 2022
