= Yargee =

Yargee is a surname. Notable people with the surname include:

- Muskogee Yargee Ross, Cree pioneer resident
- Phyllis Yargee, Cherokee Nation politician
