= PMR =

PMR may refer to:

== Businesses and organizations ==
- Romanian Workers' Party (Partidul Muncitoresc Român), a former political party
- Mauritanian Party for Renewal (Parti Mauritanien pour le Renouveau), a political party
- Port Militarization Resistance, an anti-war organization in the United States

== Places ==
- Pridnestrovian Moldavian Republic, or Transnistria
- Pune Metropolitan Region, India

== Science and technology ==
- Polymyalgia rheumatica, an inflammatory muscular disease
- Progressive muscle relaxation, a method of deep muscle relaxation
- Perpendicular magnetic recording, a technology for data recording on hard disk
- Professional mobile radio, or private mobile radio, two-way radio systems
- Plant micro-reserve, a type of small nature reserve
- Physical medicine and rehabilitation (PM&R)

== Transportation ==
- Port Manatee Railroad, Florida, United States; reporting mark PMR
- Port of Muskogee Railroad, Oklahoma, United States; reporting mark PMR
- Palmerston North Airport, New Zealand, IATA airport code PMR
- Peckham Rye railway station, England, station code PMR

== Other uses ==
- PMR Records, an independent record label
- Protected membrane roof, with thermal insulation above the waterproofing membrane
- Penilaian Menengah Rendah, a public school examination in Malaysia abolished in 2014
- Manat language, ISO 639 language code pmr
- WAGR Pm and Pmr classes, steam locomotives
