= City of Muskogee Foundation =

- Founded: June 24, 2008
- Type: Community foundation (IRS exemption status): 501(c)(3)
- Purpose: Education, Healthcare, Economic Development
- Location: Muskogee, Oklahoma
- Region served: Greater Muskogee area
- Method: Donations and Grants
- Owner: City of Muskogee, Oklahoma
- Key people: John Tyler Hammons, Mayor; John Barton, Chair; Frank Merrick, Executive Director
- Endowment: US$ 100 million
- Employees: 4
- Website: City of Muskgee Foundation

The City of Muskogee Foundation is a community foundation created by the City of Muskogee, Oklahoma (which is also the Foundation's sole owner) to manage over $100 million in assets it received from the lease of its City-owned hospital. Each year, the Foundation grants over $2 million to community organizations and non-profit groups throughout the Muskogee community.

Appointed by Muskogee Mayor John Tyler Hammons, the current chair of the board of directors is John Barton, having served in that capacity since the Foundation was established in 2008.

== Mission statement ==
The mission statement of the Foundation is "Making a Real Difference" for Muskogee.

== History ==
2007 - The Foundation's history begins in March 2007 when the City of Muskogee entered into a 40-year lease agreement with Capella Healthcare to operate the city's hospital, Muskogee Regional Medical Center. The Foundation was founded from the net proceeds of the agreement.

2008 - The Foundation was incorporated under the laws of the State of Oklahoma on June 24, 2008. The purpose of the Foundation is to issue grants to qualified non-profit organizations to improve the quality of life for Muskogee residents.

2009 - In its inaugural granting year, the Foundation reinvested almost $1 million in grant money back into the Muskogee community.

=== City of Muskogee Settlement Payout ===
On October 20, 2026, the Mayor of Muskogee, Ryan Lowe, called for the City of Muskogee Foundation to provide the funds to payout a $29 million settlement owed by the City of Muskogee. Lowe said, "My ask is that it’s paid for from those coffers, period.” The settlement brought 3 inverse condemnation lawsuits filed against Muskogee in 2007 to an end.

== Leadership ==
The current executive director is Frank Merrick, who has served in the position since the Foundation was established in 2008.

== See also ==
- Community foundation
