= 2021 Muskogee shooting =

Mass shooting in Oklahoma, U.S.

- Location: 35.73209°N 95.34805°W; Muskogee, Oklahoma, United States
- Date: February 2, 2021; 5 years ago 1:30 a.m. (CST)
- Attack type: Mass shooting, mass murder, pedicide
- Deaths: 6
- Injuries: 1
- Perpetrator: Jarron Deajon Pridgeon

The 2021 Muskogee shooting was a mass murder that occurred in Muskogee, Oklahoma, United States, on February 2, 2021, when a gunman opened fire at a house. The shooter killed six people—a man and five children—and a woman was seriously injured. Law enforcement responded to the residence at 1:30 a.m. CST. A male suspect was taken into custody after he was briefly pursued on foot by police officers, but a motive is yet undetermined and no other suspects are involved. The a request to delay the trial for murder was heard by a judge in early 2023. It is the deadliest mass shooting in Oklahoma since the 1986 Edmond post office shooting.

== Incident ==
At around 1:30 a.m., officers responded to reports of a shooting at the home where Javarion Lee and his family lived. There, they encountered an armed man.

An officer discharged his rifle once, missed, and the male ran away, but he was eventually captured.

== Victims ==
The deceased were Javarion Lee, 24 years old, and his five nieces and nephews, who ranged in age from one to nine years. They included the brother, nieces, and nephews of the shooter. The children's mother survived but suffered serious injuries, and she was airlifted to a local hospital.

Three other children at the house during the shooting were uninjured.

== Perpetrator ==
The shooter was identified by law enforcement as 25-year-old Jarron Deajon Pridgeon (born March 21, 1995), who lived occasionally with Lee and his family. Pridgeon was previously charged with assault and battery in 2019 after he threw concrete at a woman. He pleaded guilty and was placed on probation for three years. He was also ordered to undergo an evaluation by a state mental health expert to identify a potential cause for his actions. Court charges for the prosecution of the shooting included "possession of a firearm after a felony conviction," suggesting Pridgeon somehow acquired a weapon despite his criminal record.

=== Trial ===
In August 2021, Pridgeon was charged with six counts of first-degree murder in Muskogee County. Prior to Pridgeon's guilty plea, the prosecutor sought the death penalty. His deferred sentence for his prior assault was accelerated, meaning Pridgeon was sentenced to begin serving the 10-year sentence for his earlier conviction immediately for violating his plea agreement. In 2022, the Muskogee Phoenix sued for a public copy of the trial hearing transcripts, and the court reporter was initially fined for contempt for failing to provide the transcript; however, the court reporter was later revealed to have been in hospice care and the charges were dropped. The trial was initially set to begin in November 2023, but was delayed to May 2024. Pridgeon plead not guilty by reason of insanity. On October 4, 2024, Pridgeon pleaded guilty in the shooting and was sentenced to life in prison.

== Response ==
Grief counseling was provided for students at local schools that some of the deceased children attended. Counseling was also offered to police officers who had responded to the scene. Mayor Marlon Coleman announced that he would sign a proclamation to establish March as "Community Care Month for First Responders" shortly after the shooting.

Clergy groups in Muskogee led an effort to establish a monetary fund to help support the mother of the child victims, and they were assisted by the mayor's office.
