= Carolyn T. Foreman =

American historian (1872–1967)

- Born: Carolyn Thomas; 1872; Metropolis, Illinois
- Died: February 23, 1967 (aged 94–95); Muskogee, Oklahoma
- Other name: Carolyn Thomas
- Occupations: Historian; writer
- Years active: 1905–1967
- Known for: Books and articles (primarily about Oklahoma)
- Notable work: Oklahoma Imprints, 1835–1907: A History of Printing in Oklahoma Before Statehood (1936); Indians Abroad: 1493–1938 (1943)

Carolyn T. Foreman, was a noted Oklahoma historian. Born in Illinois, she moved to the city of Muskogee (then in Indian Territory) with her widowed father, John R. Thomas, a former congressman for Illinois in the 1880s, (Note: United States Congress: 46th United States Congress (1879–1881); 47th United States Congress (1881–1883); 48th United States Congress (1883–1885); 49th United States Congress (1885–1887); 50th United States Congress (1887–1889)) and politician, and who served as a federal judge after Oklahoma became a state in 1907. After marrying Grant Foreman in 1905, a lawyer and partner of her father, she became fascinated with the history of Oklahoma. After her father's murder in 1914, she and Grant closed the legal partnership and spent full time on historical research and writing. Grant died in 1953, but despite her own declining health, Foreman continued her historical work until her own death in 1967.

== Early years ==
Carolyn Thomas Foreman (1872–1967), a native of Metropolis, Illinois, was the daughter of John Robert Thomas and Charlotte Maria "Lottie" née Culver. They had married in 1870 and had five children. However, Lottie died in 1880, and three of the children also died early, leaving only Foreman and her brother John. Their father remarried, to Jessie Beattie on 1884, but this marriage produced no more issue. Much of her early education was in public and private schools in Washington, D.C., where her father served in the U.S. Congress between 1879 and 1889. After graduating from high school, Thomas attended Monticello College. (Note: Women's finishing school, seminary, junior college and academy founded in 1835 in Godfrey, Illinois. Monticello College closed permanently in 1971. Its site and buildings are now part of Lewis and Clark Community College in Godfrey.) (Note: Thomas lived in Belgium for a year, and she learned both French and German while living there.)

When her father, an active Republican politician, did not run for reelection in 1889, he moved to Muskogee (then the main city in Indian Territory) and opened a private law practice. His family, including daughter Carolyn and son John Robert Jr also moved to Muskogee. (Note: By the time of the Spanish–American War her brother had left home and begun a career in the U.S. Army, initially as part of the Rough Riders.)

While working on legal research in her father's law firm, she met lawyer and part-time historian Grant Foreman, who had joined the office in 1903. Grant and Carolyn married in 1905. They continued to live in the Thomas house for the rest of the lives, even after the judge's murder in 1914. After Grant died in 1953, Carolyn remained in the house until her own death in 1967. The house was renamed the Thomas–Foreman Historic Home and is now maintained as a museum by the Oklahoma Historical Society.

== Marriage to Grant Foreman ==
Grant Foreman, a lawyer who had previously worked for the Dawes Commission, joined the Muskogee law firm of Carolyn's father in 1903. Carolyn, though she had no formal legal training, soon began helping Grant do research for his law cases. The couple formed a good partnership and married in 1905. They had no children, but both loved to travel and became fascinated with the Indian culture that surrounded them. Initially, she helped her husband by performing research in archives, taking notes during site visits and by translating primary documents that were written in French and Spanish. He not only encouraged her, but made sure she got proper credits in his books, which would document her credibility as a writer of history.

== Career as historian ==
After Carolyn's father was killed in 1914, the law firm that had employed both Grant and Carolyn was apparently soon liquidated. The Foremans needed to decide how to support themselves. They continued living in the large house that John Robert had recently built.

Foreman began her career as a historical writer somewhat later in life than did other women who chose a similar path. Author Linda Reese noted that she had written some articles that were published in local newspapers a few years earlier, but that her first historical article had been published in The Chronicles of Oklahoma in 1927, when she was 57 years old. That was just the icebreaker. During the remainder of her life, she contributed 83 articles to that one journal, plus wrote the notes that other writers would complete for three additional to the journal. About 1930, she started researching her first major book, Oklahoma Imprints, 1835–1907: A History of Printing in Oklahoma Before Statehood (1936). (Note: According to Linda Wilson's article in the Encyclopedia of Oklahoma History and Culture, this book is still the main reference work about newspapers in Oklahoma.) According to Wilson, Carolyn's abilities with learning and using foreign languages greatly contributed to her second book, Indians Abroad: 1493–1938 (1943).

Carolyn completed authoring six books under her own name and co-authored one more. (Note: Davis D. Joyce, editor of Alternative Oklahoma, is a long-time history professor at the University of Central Oklahoma, who characterizes Foreman's approach to Oklahoma as "contrarian", meaning "out of the mainstream." Davis wrote that Foreman typically focused on social issues that most mainstream historians ignored, and that her work frequently changed others' opinions about people and events that shaped the present state.)

== Later life and death ==
Carolyn Foreman died at her home in Muskogee, Oklahoma, on February 18, 1967. Since Grant and Carolyn had no children, their home was inherited by the daughter of John Robert Thomas Jr., Mrs. William Biglow Neergaard. She deeded the home to the Oklahoma Historical Society, which made it a museum for the Foremans, now known as the Thomas–Foreman Historic Home. The house is maintained in the same condition as it was upon Foreman's death, and displays their collections, mementos and souvenirs.

== Honors and memberships ==
- Inducted into the Oklahoma Hall of Fame in 1938.
- Became an honorary member of the Oklahoma Historical Society in 1959.
- Was a member of the Pen & Brush club of NYC.

== Selected works ==
1. Foreman, Carolyn Thomas (1936). Oklahoma Imprints 1835–1907 A History of Printing in Oklahoma Before Statehood. Norman: Oklahoma UP.
2. Foreman, Carolyn Thomas (1943). Indians Abroad: 1493–1938. Norman: Oklahoma UP.
3. Foreman, Carolyn Thomas (1947). The Cross Timbers. The Star Printery Press. Muskogee, Oklahoma
4. Foreman, Carolyn Thomas (1954) Indian Women Chiefs. The Star Printery Press. Muskogee, Oklahoma

== See also ==
- Grant Foreman House, formally named Thomas-Foreman Historic Home
- Monticello Seminary

== Sources ==
1. Joyce, Davis D, ed. (2007). Alternative Oklahoma: Contrarian Views of the Sooner State. Norman: Oklahoma UP. ISBN 978-0806138190. "Chapters
  - i "Petticoat" historians: the foundation of Oklahoma social history / Linda W Reese
  - ii Three Oklahoma women / Carole Jane Joyce
  - iii Black Oklahomans : an essay on the quest for freedom / Jimmie L Franklin
  - iv Oklahoma City and the origins of the modern direct action movement / Amanda Strunk Frady
  - v Joseph Brunner and the American Indian Federation : an alternative view of Indian rights / Marci Barnes Gracey
  - vi Getting along : Woody Guthrie and Oklahoma's Red Dirt musicians / Thomas Conner
  - vii Vietnam Veterans Against the War : one Oklahoman's experience / Gary Dotterman
  - viii Nonviolent civil disobedience in Oklahoma : the campaign against nuclear power / Elizabeth D. Barlow
  - ix Under the rainbow : the search for GLBT equality in Oklahoma / Christine Pappas
  - x Oklahoma poverty, religion, and politics : lessons from economic history / Alvin O. Turner
  - xi Unraveling the mystery of freedom : prosperity inconsistency in Oklahoma / Brian Bentel
  - xii A liberal Presbyterian in the Oklahoma Bible Belt / Samuel P. Riccobene
  - xiii Tulsa : a divinely inspired city / Marlin Lavanhar
  - xiv Growing up Okie – and radical / Roxanne Dunbar-Ortiz
  "
2. Reese, Linda W (2007). "1 "Petticoat" historians: the foundation of Oklahoma social history". In Joyce, Davis D (ed.). Alternative Oklahoma: Contrarian Views of the Sooner State. Norman: Oklahoma UP. pp. 8–23. ISBN 978-0806138190.
3. Wilson, Linda D (2009). "Foreman, Carolyn Thomas (1872–1967)". In Everett, Dianna (ed.). Encyclopedia of Oklahoma History and Culture. Oklahoma Historical Society. ISBN 978-0941498753.
4. Wilson, Linda D (2009b). "Thomas, John Robert (1846–1914)". In Everett, Dianna (ed.). Encyclopedia of Oklahoma History and Culture. Oklahoma Historical Society. ISBN 978-0941498753.
