= Grant Foreman House =

Historic house in Oklahoma, United States

- U.S. National Register of Historic Places
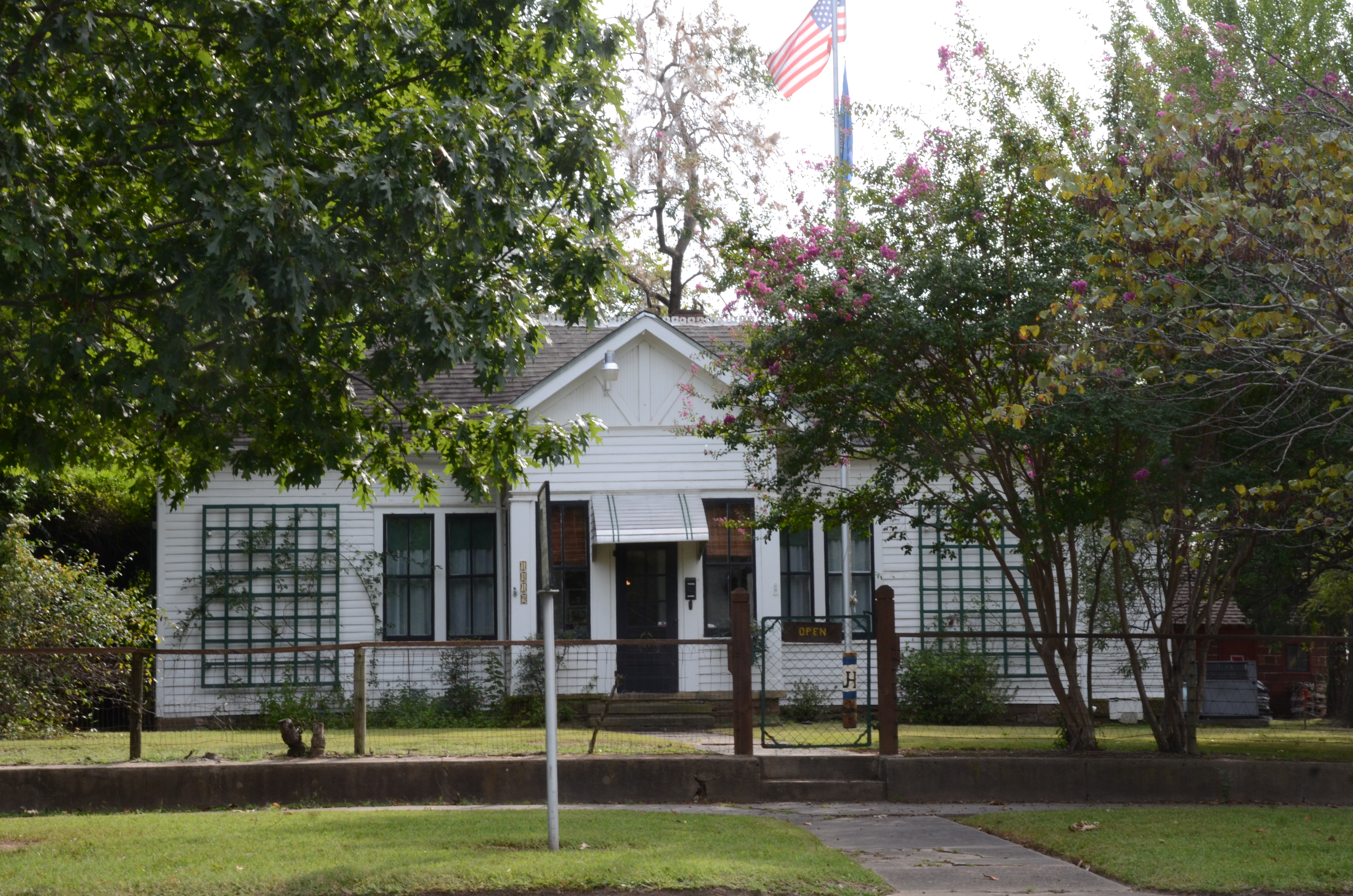
- Grant Foreman House

- Location within Oklahoma Location within the United States
- Location: 1419 West Okmulgee Ave., Muskogee, Oklahoma
- Coordinates: 35°45′12.15″N 95°23′11.51″W
- NRHP reference No.: 73001565
- Added to NRHP: September 19, 1973

The Thomas-Foreman Historic Home, also known as the Grant Foreman House, is a house in Muskogee, Oklahoma, United States, built by Judge John R. Thomas on a tract of prairie land. It was later named after Thomas' son-in-law, Grant Foreman, by the Muskogee Historical Society and the National Register of Historic Places.

Grant Foreman and his wife, Carolyn Thomas Foreman, each became notable historians who wrote a number of books and articles about Oklahoma history. On display are many of their possessions, including books and memorabilia, photos, documents and Native American works of art.

When Judge Thomas moved to Muskogee after being appointed to a newly created judgeship in 1897, he had difficulty finding a suitable property for the home he wished to build. He and his daughter, Carolyn, moved into the Adams House hotel until Thomas could get a house ready. He talked to Pleasant Porter, then the Principal Chief of the Creek Nation, who agreed to sell him a 300 foot (91 m) by another large vacant tract 300 foot (91 m) piece of the Porter Pasture, just outside the city. The Thomases moved in during 1898.

Reportedly, there was only one small log cabin in the vicinity and no vegetation except grass. (Note: Another piece of property in the vicinity had been donated to the Presbyterian church for construction of Henry Kendall College. The college would later be relocated to Tulsa, and by 1920 would be renamed as the University of Tulsa.) The judge planted 350 trees which provided fruit and shade. A large red oak tree in the northwest corner of the property is the only one of these original trees still standing. Carolyn and Grant collected a number of acorns while honeymooning in California in 1905. These apparently survived until the present.

== Three Rivers Museum ==
The Grant-Foreman House is operated by the Three Rivers Museum. The Three Rivers Museum was established in Muskogee in 1989 as the dream of local historian Dorothy Ball, chairman at that time of the Muskogee Historic Preservation Commission. The main building of the museum, the formerly-abandoned Midland Valley Railroad Depot, was obtained in 1998 with federal grant funds. Due to budget issues regarding maintenance and public access with respect to the Grant Foreman House owned by the Oklahoma Historical Society, the Museum voted in 2002 to contract with OHS to take over the operation of that site and make needed renovations.
