= A. G. W. Sango =

American journalist

A. G. W. Sango (born 1868) was an American lawyer, newspaper editor, and school founder in Muskogee, Oklahoma. He was one of Muskogee's most prominent African-American leaders.

== Life ==
Sango was born a half mile north of Muskogee by the Arkansas River. He received a 160-acre allotment and worked as a teacher.

Sango organized and led the Creek Citizens Bank and served as treasurer of Sango Baptist College, a school for African American Creek he organized.

Sango was the first editor of the Muskogee Sun, which launched in 1893. He also served as president of the Muskogee Businessmen's League.

In 1921, Sango was suspended from practicing law for six months.

Sango was a Republican.
