= Port of Muskogee Railroad =

Shortline railroad in Oklahoma

- Port Muskogee Railroad; Muskogee City-County Port Railroad
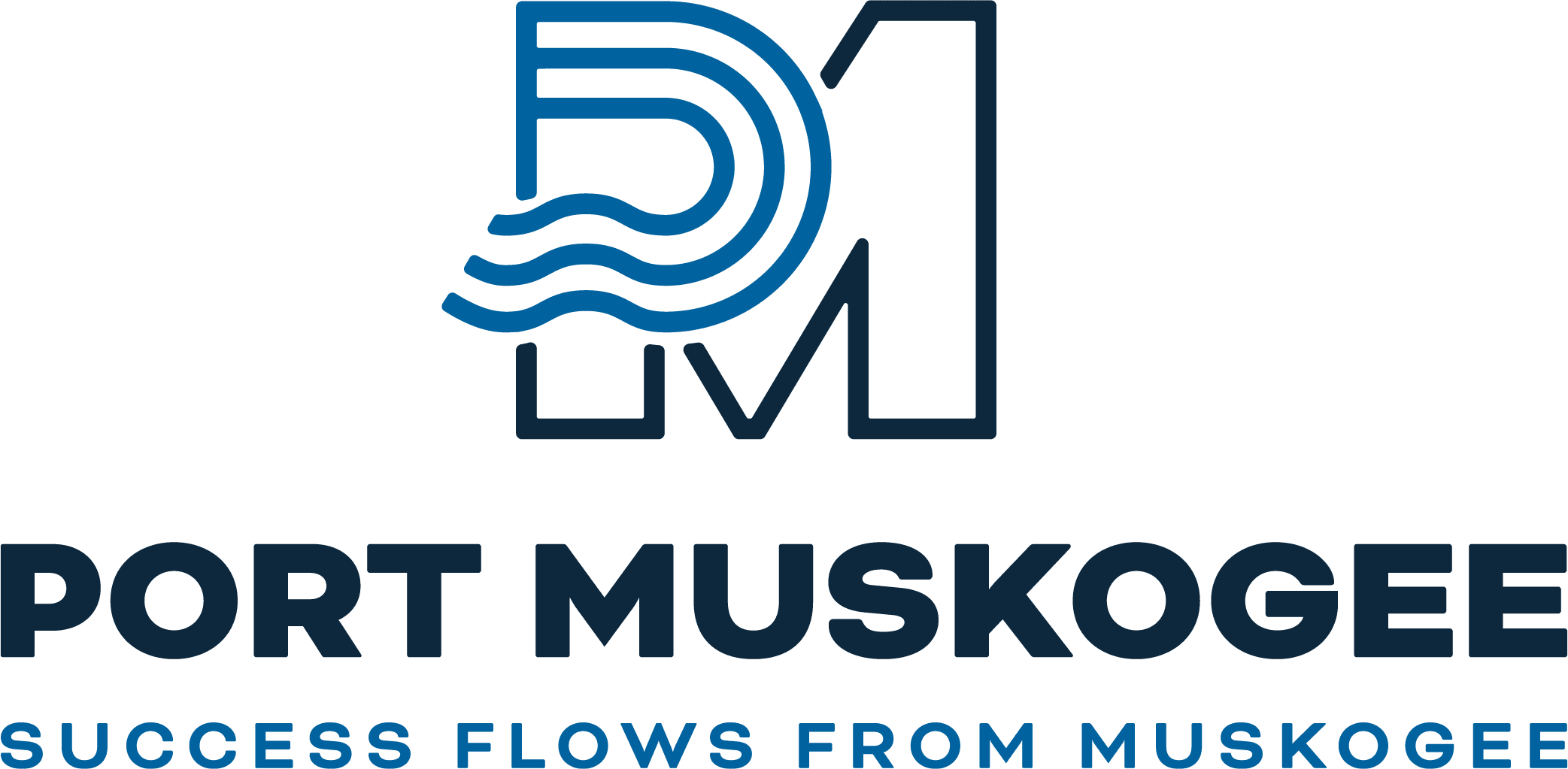

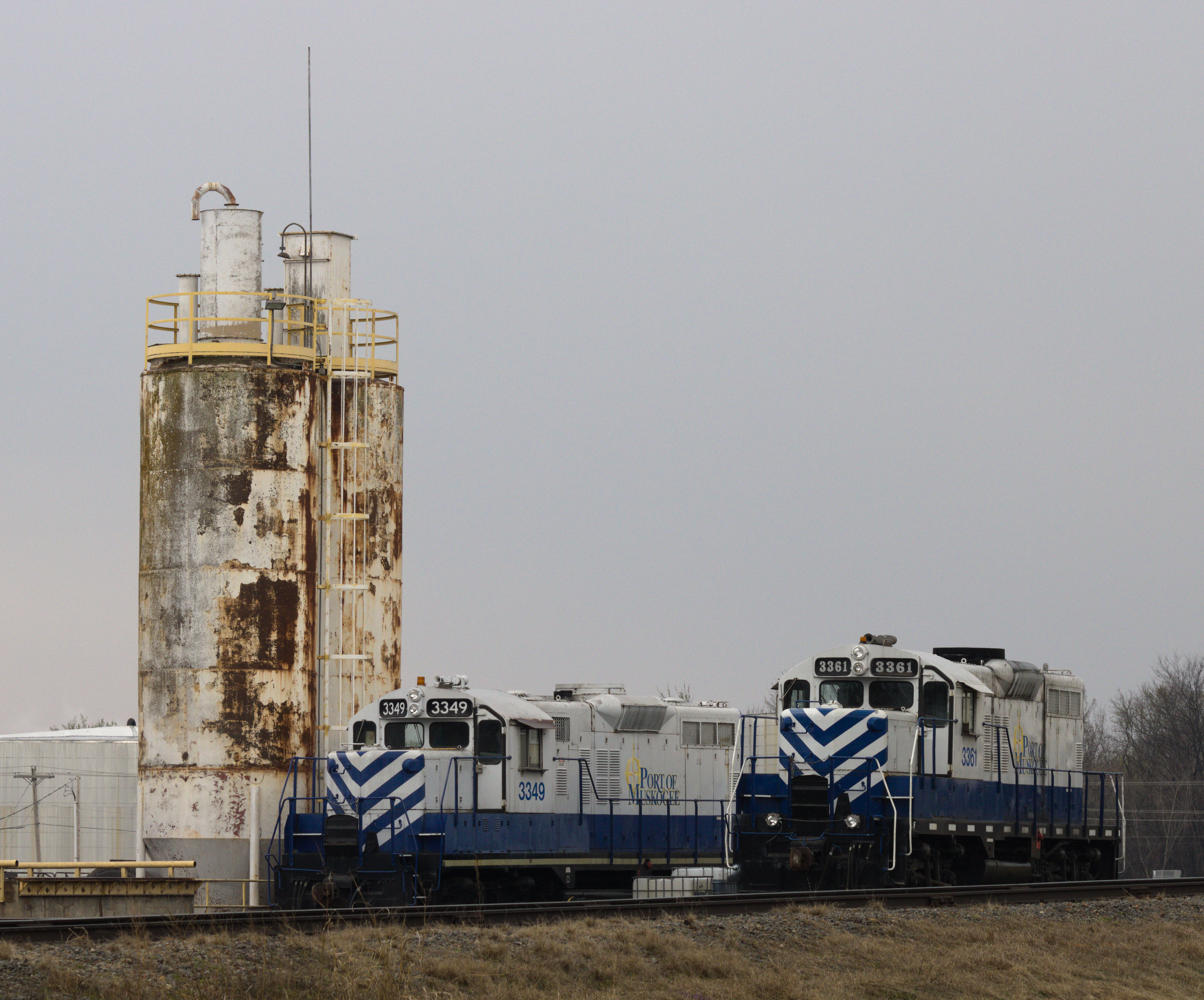
- PMKX 3349 and 3361 in Muskogee, OK, 2026

Overview
- Operator: Muskogee City-County Port Authority (1971–2025); OmniTRAX (2025–present)
- Fleet: 2 EMD GP9R locomotives
- Parent company: Muskogee City-County Port Authority
- Reporting mark: PMKX; PMR; MCCP
- Locale: Muskogee, Oklahoma
- Dates of operation: January 22, 1971–present

Technical
- Track gauge: 1,435 mm (4 ft 8 1/2 in)
- Track length: 8.1 mi (13.0 km) (used lines only); 39 mi (63 km) (rail-banked MoPac line)

The Port of Muskogee Railroad (Note: Also known as the Port Muskogee Railroad) (reporting marks PMKX, PMR), formerly known as the Muskogee City-County Port Railroad (reporting mark MCCP), is a shortline railroad that operates at the Port of Muskogee in Muskogee, Oklahoma. The railroad began its operations on January 22, 1971, transporting freight between the industries at the Port of Muskogee, and from the Port of Muskogee to the Union Pacific and Burlington Northern & Santa Fe railroad lines. In the 1990s, Johnston's Terminal—one of the industries the railroad served—had owned several of their own locomotives until the Port of Muskogee bought their own locomotives.

== Operations ==
The Port of Muskogee Railroad is connected with the Union Pacific (UP) and the Burlington Northern & Santa Fe (BNSF) railroad lines. The railroad connects to the UP via the Midland Valley branch line. The branch line begins at a junction with a UP mainline, crosses Oklahoma State Highway 16, and continues east to the PMKX marshaling yard—known as the Port Muskogee Marshaling Yard, or the McLemore Marshaling Yard—which is east of the Muskogee Turnpike. The railroad line continues east from the marshaling yard, underneath the Muskogee Turnpike, to the industries at the Port of Muskogee. The PMKX shunts freight cars between the industries at the Port of Muskogee, and between the Port of Muskogee and the UP.

== History ==
The tracks operated by the railroad were built as early as 1970, being composed of rails weighing 85 to 115 pounds (39 to 52 kg). When the tracks were built, the curve radii ranged from 8.5° to 16°. The railroad began its operations on January 22, 1971. When the railroad began its operations, the railroad track was 7,000 feet (2.1 km) long, and connected to the Texas Pacific Railroad. In 1976, the railroad operated two locomotives on twelve miles of track. In 1993, the Muskogee City-County Port Authority acquired 39 miles (63 km) of track from the Missouri Pacific Railroad, which runs from Muskogee to Stigler; since then, the line has been rail-banked.

The railroad moves freight between the ports at the Port of Muskogee and the UP railroad line. Most of the freight transported by the railroad was to and from the barges at the Port of Muskogee. In 2024, the railroad hauled 2,140 freight cars, which totaled 184,890 short tons (165,080 long tons). The most transported materials were steel coils and pipe. The UP accesses the railroad with four-axle locomotives; the curve on the junction between the UP mainline and the Midland Valley branch line is too tight for the standard six-axle locomotives operated by the UP.

The railroad's track mileage changed several times throughout the 2010s. The railroad operated 4.5 miles (7.2 km) of track in 2012, 5.5 miles (8.9 km) of track in 2018, and owned over 9 miles (14 km) of track. In May 2012, the railroad proposed to build a wye and 3/4 mile (1.2 km) of track running south, connecting to the BNSF railroad line. Since 2018, the railroad connects to BNSF. The United States Department of Transportation had announced a federal grant to pay for a 9,700-foot (3.0 km) extension of track for the railroad, which was later built. Following the 2019 Arkansas River floods, the Port of Muskogee received significant damage, and the railroad's track had to be repaired and rebuilt. On May 28, 2025, OmniTRAX took over operations for the Port of Muskogee Railroad. In the early 2020s, the railroad continued to operate 5.5 miles (8.9 km) of track; under the new operator, the railroad was 8.1 miles (13.0 km) long.

== Locomotives ==
=== Johnston's Terminal locomotives ===
JT 54, a Baldwin AS-616, in the original Johnston's Terminal livery, 1994. JT 54 was painted blue, and detailed with a white stripe running to white noses on both ends.

Johnston's Terminal (JT), now owned by Bruce Oakley, is a facility that loads and transfers freight between barges, trucks, and freight cars alongside the PMKX at the Port of Muskogee. JT operates at the port's terminal under a contract with the Muskogee City-County Port Authority. JT has owned several of their own locomotives, including one Baldwin S-12, JT 007, and three Baldwin AS-616 locomotives, JT 52–54. Since 2002, the ports owned by JT are connected to the PMKX.

JT 007 was built in October 1953, with the serial number 75922. JT 007 operated as Southern Pacific (SP) No. 1547, Metropolitan Stevedore No. 2, and Willbros No. 5683 before it became JT 007. The locomotive was acquired from Metropolitan Stevedore from Long Beach, California, and operated as Willbros No. 5683 before it was JT 007. In March 1986, the S-12 was painted blue, and retained its Willbros lettering before it was lettered and numbered as JT 007. JT 007 was in service when JT 52–54 had arrived at the railroad. The locomotive was sold in 1995 to SMS Rail Lines (SLRS). The locomotive's engine block had been cracked in 2001, and was stored until 2002, when it was moved to SLRS.

The three AS-616 locomotives originally worked for the Trona Railway before they were sold to JT. JT 54 was built in June 1952, with the serial number 75357. JT 54 operated as Kaiser Steel No. 1012B in 1952, Rayonier No. 14 in 1973, Trona No. 54 in 1986, and JT 54 in 1993. The three AS-616 locomotives had been leased to the Trona Railway by the SP; the Trona Railway retired the AS-616 locomotives, and sold them to JT. In January 1993, JT 54 was shipped from the Trona Railway to JT. On May 23, 1993, JT 52–54 arrived at the Port of Muskogee. JT 52 entered service on May 25, and the terminal began repainting the locomotives in their livery on June 10. In 1995, JT 52–54 were sold to SLRS. JT 54 was moved to SLRS in 1995, while JT 52 and 53 remained at Johnston's Terminal until 1998.

=== Port of Muskogee Railroad locomotives ===
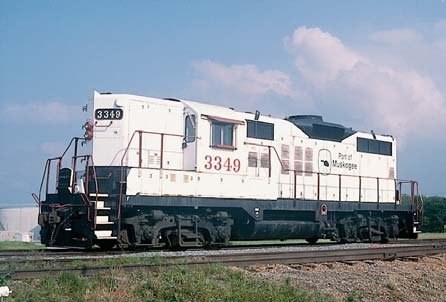
PMKX 3349 as an EMD GP9 in an earlier Port of Muskogee livery, 2000

PMKX had owned a GE 45-ton switcher in 1992. In May 1995, Pacific RailNews writers Bob Thompson and Monger Wayne had seen two EMD GP9R locomotives—which originally worked for the Southern Pacific—at the Port of Muskogee. The writers stated that the two GP9 locomotives were to replace the AS-616 locomotives; at the same time, the AS-616 locomotives were seen for sale.

Since 1995, the Port of Muskogee Railroad owns two 1,750-horsepower (1,300 kW) EMD GP9R locomotives: PMKX 3349 and 3361. PMKX 3349 and 3361 were built in February and April 1956 respectively, with the serial numbers 21336 and 21374. PMKX 3349 originally operated as Illinois Central (IC) No. 8972 as an EMD GP7, and PMKX 3361 operated as SP 5681. The locomotives were later converted to EMD GP9R locomotives, and are inspected every 92 days by the Port of Muskogee.
