= Honor Heights Park =

Park in Muskogee, Oklahoma, United States

Coordinates: 35.768533°N 95.416095°W

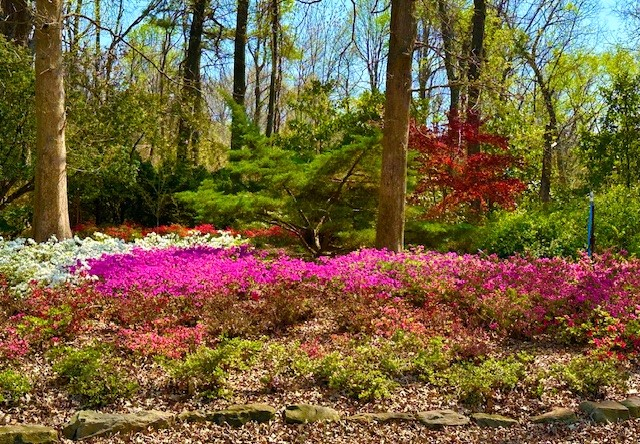
- Azaleas in bloom.
- Interactive map of Honor Heights Park
- Type: Botanical garden, Arboretum
- Location: Muskogee, Oklahoma
- Area: 132 acres (53 ha)
- Website: Official website

Honor Heights Park is a 132 acres (53 ha) botanical garden and arboretum located at 1400 Honor Heights Drive in Muskogee, Oklahoma. It is a public park operated by the City of Muskogee.

== History ==
In 1909, the City of Muskogee purchased the original 40 acres (160,000 m^{2}) of Honor Heights Park for $4,500. Agency Hill was officially named Honor Heights Park in 1919 in honor of the soldiers of World War I.

== Features ==
Honor Heights Park is known for its azaleas and hosts the annual Azalea Festival each April. It features Symphony in the Park in June. It also includes the Conard Rose Garden, the C. Clay Harrell Arboretum, Art Johnson Memorial Dogwood Collection, Elbert L. Little, Jr. Native Tree Collection, floral gardens, the white garden, and the Rainbow Division Memorial Amphitheater.

The park also features three trails: the Henry Bresser Nature Trail, the Audubon Trail, and the half-mile Stem Beach Trail, as well as picnic areas, two picnic shelters, a pavilion, a gift shop, gazebos, and public restrooms. The park is home to sports areas such as fishing in 5 lakes and ponds from the shore or fully-accessible fishing docks, a playground and splash pad, open play areas, and three tennis courts. The Papilion Butterfly House is open daily Mother's Day Weekend through the end of September. In November and December, the park becomes the Garden of Lights when the azaleas, with trees and other shrubbery, are covered with over 1.2 million shimmering lights.

In addition to its gardens, the Five Civilized Tribes Museum within the park is dedicated to the art and history of the Cherokee, Creek, Chickasaw, Choctaw, and Seminole Tribes. It is housed in an 1875 Indian Agency building.

== Gallery ==
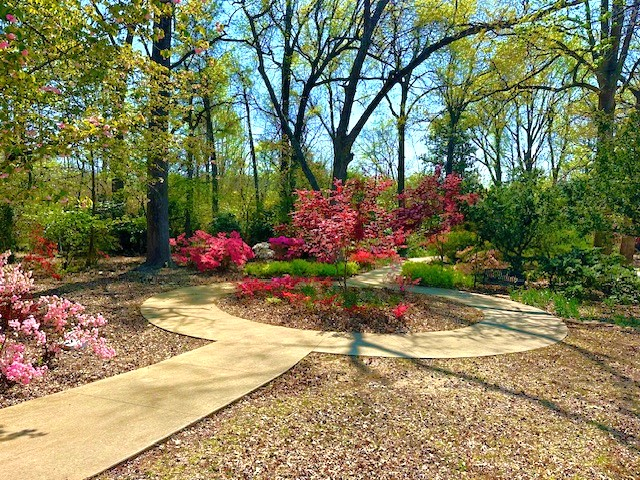
Walkway though the flora.

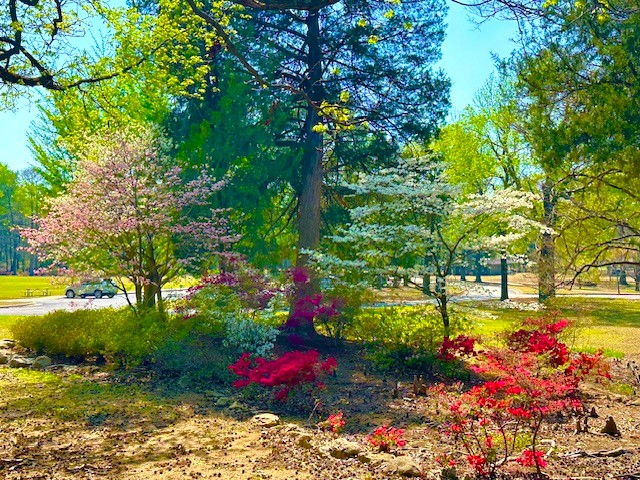
Blooming trees and flowers.

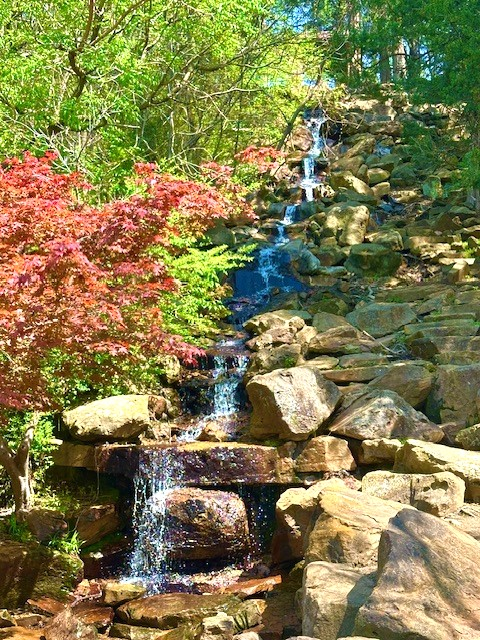
A waterfall in the park.

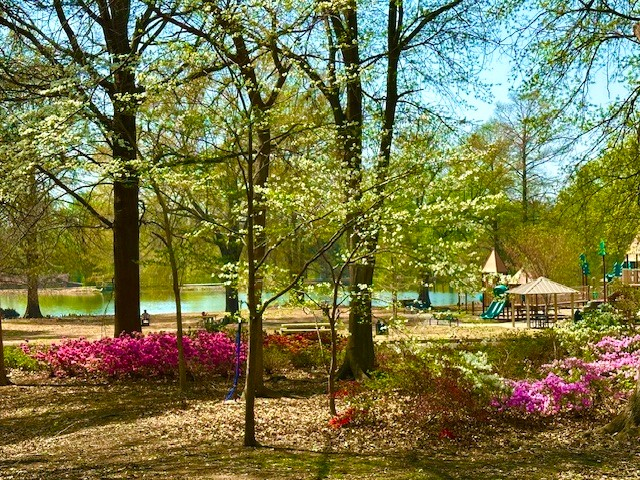
Park playground and lake.

== See also ==
- List of botanical gardens and arboretums in the United States
