= Muskogee Yargee Ross =

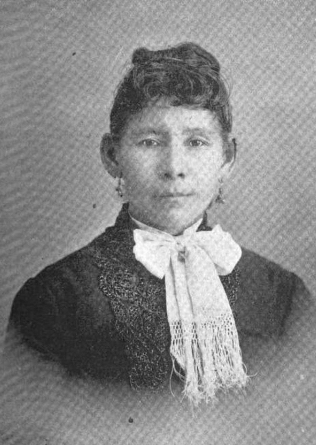
- Muskogee Yargee Ross, from an 1892 publication.
- Born: 1840s Indian Territory
- Died: March 14, 1913; Muskogee, Oklahoma
- Other names: Muscogee Yargee Ross, Muscogee Ross, Mrs. Joshua Ross

Muskogee Yargee Ross (1840s – March 14, 1913) was a Creek (or Muscogee) woman, a prominent pioneer resident of Muskogee, Oklahoma.

== Biography ==
Muskogee Yargee was born along the Canadian River, near North Fork Town, Indian Territory (present day Oklahoma), the daughter of Captain Checartah Yargee and Millie McQueen. Her father was a Creek planter. After the Indian Removal Act, he was relocated with his large enslaved workforce from Alabama to Indian Territory, before her birth. She learned to speak and read English when she went to school. She is listed on the Dawes Rolls as "Creek by Blood" with a "Full" blood quantum.

Muskogee Yargee married Joshua Ross, a successful businessman and a member of a prominent Cherokee family, in 1864. They raised nine children, including her niece and nephew. The Rosses were considered pioneers of Muskogee, Oklahoma, and founding members of the First United Methodist Church of Muskogee. Muskogee Street in the town was, in part, named for her. She was active in church work and was known for her home remedies. She died in Muskogee in 1913, when she was about 70 years old.
