= Hilldale, Virginia =

Unincorporated community in Virginia, US

Coordinates: 38°40′02″N 78°26′01″W

Hilldale is an unincorporated community in Page County, in the U.S. state of Virginia.
