= Muskogee Phoenix =

Newspaper in Muskogee, Oklahoma

- Type: Daily newspaper
- Format: Broadsheet
- Owner: CNHI
- Publisher: Heather Kilpatrick
- Editor: Kim Poindexter
- Founded: 1888
- Headquarters: 530 Court Street; Muskogee, Oklahoma 74401; United States
- Circulation: 15,909 Daily; 17,073 Sunday (as of 2006)
- Website: muskogeephoenix.com

The Muskogee Phoenix is a daily newspaper published in Muskogee, Oklahoma, United States, covering several counties of northeastern Oklahoma. It is owned by CNHI. The paper is printed five days a week (Tuesday-Saturday), while digital access is available 7 days a week.

== History ==
The Phoenix was founded in February 1888, when Oklahoma was still a territory.

From 1980 through 1986, Marjorie Paxson was publisher.
