= Hilldale Public Schools =

School district in Oklahoma

Coordinates: 35.710701°N 95.370718°W

Hilldale Public Schools is an independent school district located in Muskogee, Oklahoma. The district was started in 1909 as a one-room school, and has grown to a current student body of 2,015 students in pre-K through 12th grade. The district now operates three campuses. The school mascot is the Hornet and the school colors are Red and White. Hilldale High School developed gradually as the demand for higher grade levels increased. In 1982, Hilldale High School graduated its first class of seniors of 83 graduates.

In late 2012, the District passed a bond issue for construction of two new cafeterias (one large cafe at each site), new classrooms at the middle school, and a new band room at the Secondary site.

School activities include: girls and boys basketball, girls and boys soccer, softball, baseball, football, cheerleading, track, cross country, band, color guard, academic team, and many school clubs starting in 7th grade. But color guard, which starts in 9th grade.

Mission Statement:

Hilldale Public Schools’ mission is to provide educational opportunities that promote academic excellence in a safe and orderly environment.
