= Muskogee Police Department =

Police department in Oklahoma, U.S.

- Abbreviation: MPD

Agency overview
- Formed: 1898
- Annual budget: Approximately $6 million

Jurisdictional structure
- Operations jurisdiction: Muskogee, Oklahoma, USA
- Area: 46.0 square miles (119 km^{2})
- Population: 37,402 (2018)
- General nature: Local civilian police

Operational structure
- Headquarters: Muskogee, Oklahoma
- Police Officers: 91
- Unsworn members: 28
- Elected officer responsible: Marlon Coleman, Mayor
- Agency executive: Johnny Teehee, Chief

Website
- Muskogee Police website

Muskogee Police Department is the primary law enforcement agency in Muskogee, Oklahoma, United States. Consisting of 91 sworn officers and 28 other employees, the department serves a population of over 40,000 people.

== History ==
The Muskogee Police Department was established in 1898. Prior to its establishment, law enforcement in Muskogee was provided by the United States Marshals Service and a city marshal. One early officer was Federal Deputy Marshal Bass Reeves, the first African American to serve in such an office.

Since 1995, crime rate has reduced 45% in Muskogee. According to records by the Oklahoma State Bureau of Investigation, in 2002, 2008 and 2009, no murders were committed for the entire year.

The department was under the supervision and operational command of Chief of Police Rex Eskridge, a member of the department since 1969 and police chief since 1992.

Chief of Police Rex Eskridge retired in July 2018 after 49 years of service. Deputy Chief Johnny Teehee was sworn in as Chief of Police on July 17, 2018.

== Controversies ==
=== 2009 arrest of Larry Eugene Chaplin ===
In 2009, two local officers arrested Larry Eugene Chaplin. They handcuffed him and then allowed a police dog to attack him while he was on the ground. In March 2012, the city settled with Chaplin for an undisclosed amount.

=== 2016 traffic stop ===
Muskogee Police made the news after they pursued an alleged traffic stop on August 7, 2016, from a man running a stop sign and continuing to his mother's home after refusing to stop led to police forcing their way into the home where the situation ended with the 84-year-old mother being pepper sprayed as well as the 54-year-old man police were pursuing being tasered.

The matter became under investigation after pressure arose online following the release of body camera video. Much of the public believed the police utilized unnecessary force, especially in spraying the woman, who many believed did not seem threatening or uncooperative.

== See also ==
- List of law enforcement agencies in Oklahoma
