= Port of Muskogee =

Coordinates: 35°47′10″N 95°18′04″W

- Interactive map of Port of Muskogee

Location
- Country: United States
- Location: Muskogee County, Oklahoma

Details
- Opened: December 31, 1970
- Owned by: Muskogee City-County Port Authority

Statistics
- Website https://www.portmuskogee.com/

The Port of Muskogee, rebranded as Port Muskogee in January 2023, is a regional inland port located on the McClellan-Kerr Arkansas River Navigation System in Muskogee County, Oklahoma, in the United States. It is a multi-modal local hub for the transport of goods via trucks, railroad, and barges on the Arkansas River. It is one of the farthest inland ports in the United States that remains ice-free year-round and can access the Gulf of Mexico. It is located near the confluence of the Arkansas River, Grand River and Verdigris River in Oklahoma, (Note: This confluence was historically named Three Rivers, and the area around it is still known by that name.) at River Mile 393.8 of the McClellan-Kerr Arkansas River Navigation System.

== Port traffic ==
In 2011, the port served 550 barges carrying over 835,000 short tons (757,000 t) of cargo. (Note: Each standard barge has a capacity of 1,500 short tons (1,400 t), equivalent to the capacity of 15 railroad cars or 60 trucks.) The largest inbound commodities were nepheline syenite, clay, steel, fertilizer, coke and sand. Other inbound cargoes brought to the Port of Muskogee by barge in 2011 included molasses, rebar, iron ore, feed products, cookie meal, asphalt, glass cullet, and granite fines. In 2011, cargoes leaving the Port of Muskogee by barge included coke, fly ash, and steel.

The port reported that in 2014, it had handled 3,564 railcars carrying 309,841 short tons (281,083 t) of cargo and 459 barges carrying 688,802 short tons (624,871 t). For 2015, it reported serving 2,210 railcars hauling 205,154 short tons (186,113 t) of cargo and 452 barges with totalling 688,802 short tons (624,871 t) cargo.

== Muskogee City-County Port Authority ==
The governments of Muskogee County and the City of Muskogee, Oklahoma cooperated in the formation of the Muskogee City-County Port Authority, whose principal responsibility is to promote the construction of the inland port's facilities and to recruit cargo-handling, warehousing, and transportation industries to use them. One of its earliest achievements was to break ground for the $2.5 million Muskogee Industrial Park. The port opened for business on December 31, 1970, and the first commercial barge docked there on January 3, 1971.

== Facilities ==
The port includes a concrete wharf that is 350 feet (110 m) long and twenty mooring dolphins that line another 3,000 feet (910 m) of the waterfront.

== Tenants ==
On January 22, 2025, ground was broken on the Stardust Power Inc. $1.2 billion lithium refinery near the Port. The initial production line will produce up to 25,000 metric tons of battery-grade lithium per year, with a projected second phase doubling that capacity.

== Port of Muskogee Railroad ==
The Port of Muskogee Railroad (reporting mark PMR) provides daily service over 8,1 miles of tracks to port industries for Class 1 interchange, cargo transfer and storage. Both the Union Pacific Railroad and BNSF Railway offer mainline service to the port.
