= John Tyler Hammons =

American politician

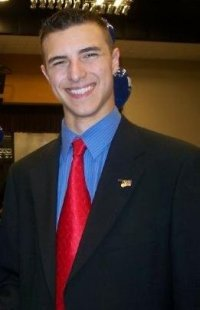

City Attorney of Checotah
- Incumbent
- Assumed office January 2019

47th Mayor of Muskogee
- In office May 19, 2008 – February 20, 2012
- Preceded by: Wren Stratton
- Succeeded by: Bob Coburn

Personal details
- Born: 4 September 1988 (age 38) Muskogee, Oklahoma, US
- Party: Republican
- Spouse: Courtney Elizabeth Burden
- Education: University of Oklahoma
- Occupation: City Attorney of Checotah, Oklahoma City Attorney of McAllister

John Tyler Hammons (born September 4, 1988) is an American politician who served as the 47th mayor of Muskogee, Oklahoma, from 2008 to 2012. He gained national attention when he was elected on May 13, 2008, as a 19-year-old freshman at the University of Oklahoma, after winning 70 percent of the vote in a runoff election against 70-year-old, three-time former Muskogee mayor Herschel McBride. Hammons was reelected on April 6, 2010, in a four-way race.

First elected at the age of 19, Hammons was among the youngest mayors in United States history. After serving two terms, Hammons, a citizen of the Cherokee Nation, commenced studies in summer 2012 at the University of Oklahoma College of Law. Hammons served as assistant attorney general for the Cherokee Nation from 2015 to 2017 and was appointed city attorney of Checotah, Oklahoma, in January 2019.

== Life and education ==
John Tyler Hammons was born in Muskogee, Oklahoma, on September 4, 1988, and is an enrolled member of the Cherokee Nation. Hammons graduated from Muskogee High School in 2007. Before beginning his senior year, Hammons was a delegate to the Oklahoma Boys State. During his senior year, Hammons was his high school's student body president and was president of both the Young Republicans and Young Democrats at Muskogee High School.

After graduating, Hammons attended the University of Oklahoma for his freshman year of college. He transferred to Northeastern State University in Tahlequah, Oklahoma, in the fall of 2008. In 2010, Hammons enrolled at the University of Oklahoma-Tulsa, from which he graduated in 2012. Hammons later graduated from the University of Oklahoma College of Law, and passed the Oklahoma Bar Examination in July 2015.

== Mayoralty (2008–2012) ==
Hammons declared his candidacy for mayor of Muskogee on January 29 and filed for office on February 5. By the end of the filing date, Hammons was one of six candidates vying to be mayor, including a former Muskogee mayor and a former city councilor. On election night on April 1, Hammons won the popular vote by coming in first place with 42% of the vote. Herschel McBride came in second place with 38% of the vote. The remaining 20% was divided among the four other candidates. With the general election failing to deliver a candidate with an absolute majority, the Muskogee City Charter required Hammons and McBride to face one another in a runoff election to determine who would serve as mayor. Vote tallies showed Hammons carried the east side of Muskogee while McBride carried the west side. At the May 13 runoff election, Hammons had captured 70% of the vote, winning the largest popular vote total of any candidate in Muskogee history and the largest margin of victory in Muskogee County history. The election was the largest shakeup in the city government since 1952. On May 19, 2008, Hammons was sworn in as 47th (and youngest) Mayor of the City of Muskogee.

At a press conference held on November 30, 2009, at the Oklahoma Music Hall of Fame, Hammons announced that he would seek a second term as mayor of Muskogee. Hammons drew three opponents: local businessman and cousin of sitting US Senator Tom Coburn Bob Coburn, local travel agent Chris James, and local volunteer Teresa Garris. On election day, April 6, 2010, Hammons handily won reelection to a second two-year term, receiving just over 51% of the vote in the four-way race, defeating his nearest opponent by 20 percentage points. In the election, Hammons carried 17 of the city's 18 voting precincts.

On November 3, 2011, Hammons announced his plans to step down at the end of his second term, having decided to attend the University of Oklahoma College of Law rather than seek a third term in office. As one of his last acts, Hammons changed Muskogee's decades-old electoral system from one in which all City Council members are elected by the city at-large to one in which each member is elected only by the voters in the electoral district they represent. In his farewell address in February 2012, Hammons, calling Muskogee a "shining city on the hill", listed enacting permanent funding for economic development, road improvements, and tourism promotion as his top achievements while in office. Councilman Bob Coburn, Hammons' 2010 challenger, was elected to succeed him in office.

== Election history ==
Summary of the April 1, 2008 Muskogee mayoral general election results
Candidates	Party	Votes	%
John Tyler Hammons	Nonpartisan	1,849	42.38%
Herschel McBride	Nonpartisan	1,697	38.90%
Ron Ventors Sr.	Nonpartisan	553	12.67%
Glyenda Oliver	Nonpartisan	132	3.03%
Barney Taylor	Nonpartisan	80	1.83%
Robert Thomas	Nonpartisan	52	1.19%
Total		4,363	100.0%
Source: 2008 Muskogee General Election Results

Summary of the April 6, 2010 Muskogee mayoral general election results
Candidates	Party	Votes	%
John Tyler Hammons (incumbent)	Nonpartisan	2,531	51.43%
Bob Coburn	Nonpartisan	1,447	29.40%
Chris James	Nonpartisan	887	17.82%
Teresa Garris	Nonpartisan	67	1.36%
Total		4,932	100.0%
Source: 2010 Muskogee General Election Results

Summary of the May 13, 2008 Muskogee mayoral runoff election results
Candidates	Party	Votes	%
John Tyler Hammons	Nonpartisan	3,703	69.62%
Herschel McBride	Nonpartisan	1,616	30.38%
Total		5,319	100.0%
Source: 2008 Muskogee Runoff Election Results

== 2008 presidential election ==
Hammons endorsed former New York City Mayor Rudy Giuliani early in the 2008 Republican presidential primaries. When Giuliani withdrew from the race, Hammons endorsed Arizona Senator John McCain. Hammons was also Oklahoma's youngest at-large delegate to the 2008 Republican National Convention. While at the RNC, on his 20th birthday and the final day of the RNC, Hammons had the opportunity to meet Giuliani.

In January 2009, Hammons attended the inauguration of Barack Obama as the 44th President of the United States in conjunction with the winter session of the United States Conference of Mayors.

== In popular culture ==
- Hammons appeared on Fox TV's Are You Smarter Than a 5th Grader?, hosted by Jeff Foxworthy, on October 24, 2008, winning $25,000 for his charity after missing the following question: "What is the name of the first American woman to travel to outer space?". Unsure of the correct answer, he "copied" the 5th grader's answer, which was wrong.
- Hammons was the opening joke for Bill Engvall's 2009 album, Aged and Confused.
- The magazine Cosmopolitan named Hammons as one of seven sexy young politicians in January 2010.

== See also ==
- Jaylen Smith (politician)

Political offices
Preceded by Wren Stratton	Mayor of Muskogee, Oklahoma; 2008–2012	Succeeded by Bob Coburn
