= Muskogee, Oklahoma =

Muskogee, Oklahoma Mvskokuce (Creek)
- City
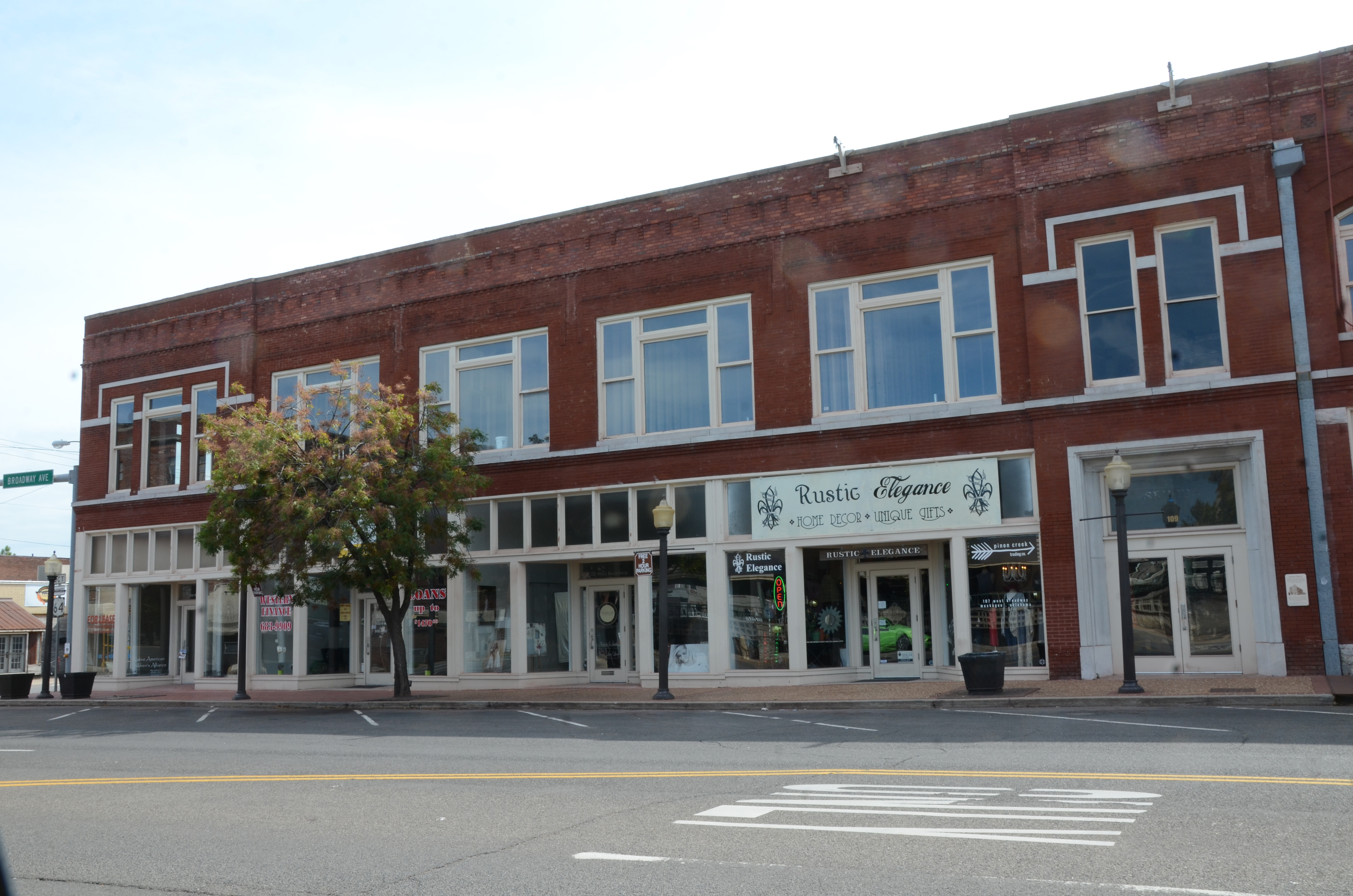
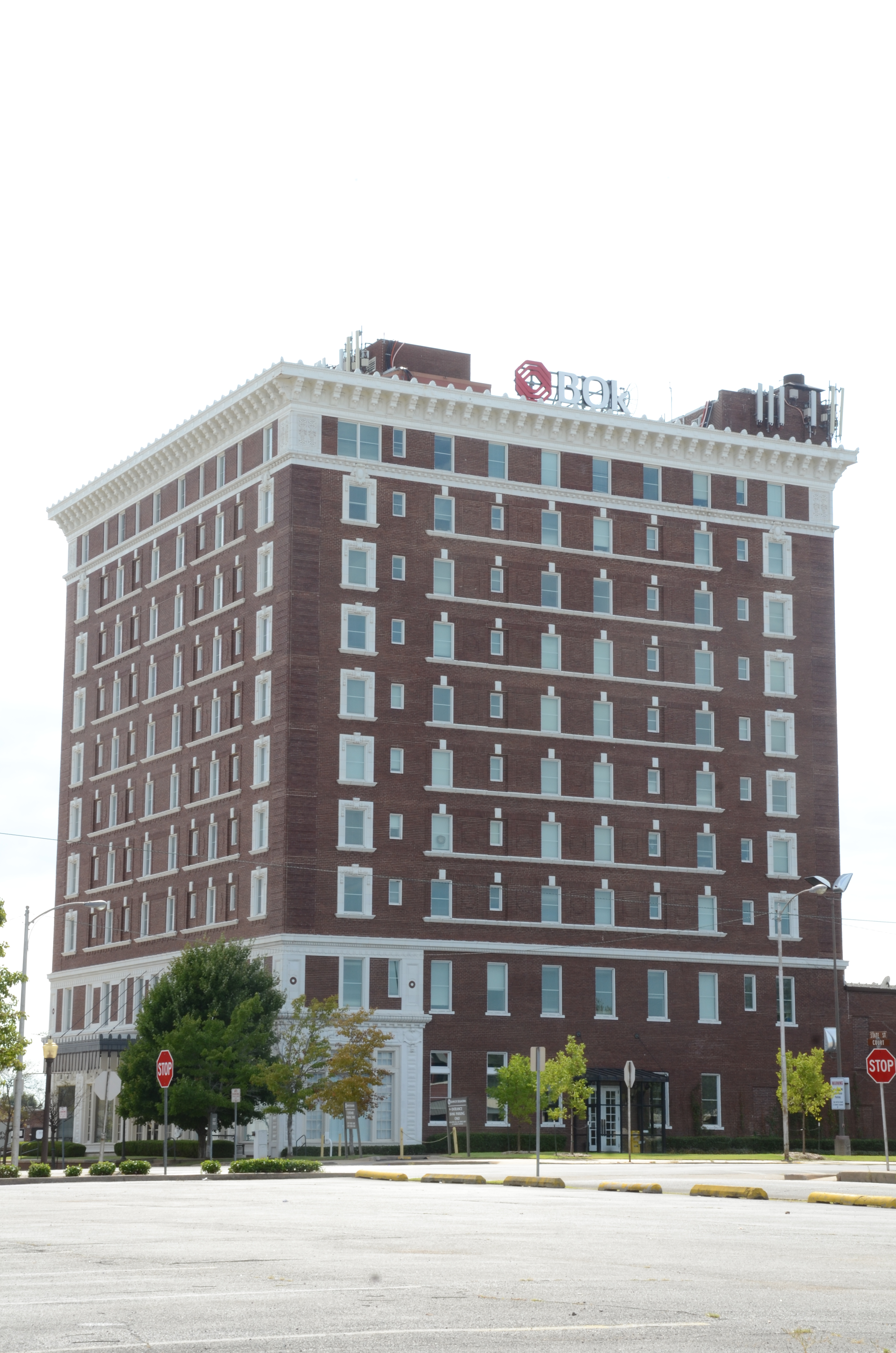
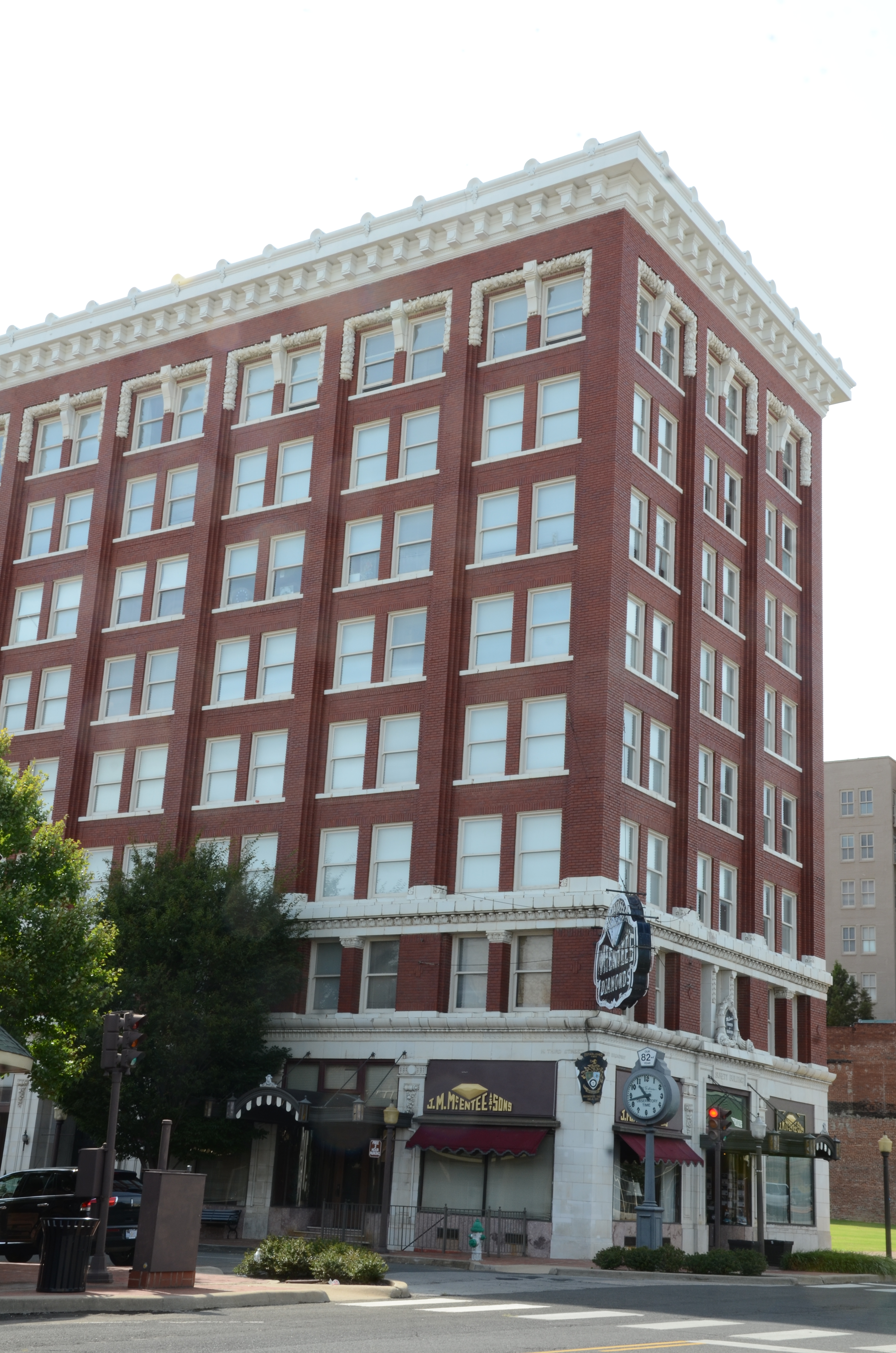
- From top, left to right: Pre-Statehood Commercial District, Severs Hotel, Surety Building, Ed Edmondson United States Courthouse

- The Great Seal of the City of Muskogee
- Etymology: Creek language
- Nicknames: The Skoge, Oklahoma's River City, Oklahoma's Music City
- Motto: "A Place Where Even Squares Can Have a Ball"
- Location within Oklahoma Location within the United States
- Coordinates: 35°44′36″N 95°21′24″W
- Country: United States
- State: Oklahoma
- County: Muskogee County
- Founded: March 16, 1898

Government
  - Type: Council-manager
  - Mayor: Patrick Cale (R)
  - Deputy Mayor: Derrick A. Reed
  - City Manager: Mike Miller

Area
  - Total: 44.48 sq mi (115.21 km^{2})
  - Land: 42.96 sq mi (111.27 km^{2})
  - Water: 1.52 sq mi (3.94 km^{2})
- Elevation: 577 ft (176 m)

Population (2020)
  - Total: 36,878
  - Density: 858.4/sq mi (331.44/km^{2})
- Time zone: UTC−6 (CT)
  - Summer (DST): UTC−5 (CT)
- ZIP Codes: 74401‑74403 (Muskogee); 74434 (Fort Gibson)
- Area code: 918
- FIPS code: 40-50050
- GNIS feature ID: 2411201
- Website: www.muskogeeok.gov

Muskogee (/məˈskoʊɡiː/, Creek: Mvskokuce) is the 13th-largest city in Oklahoma and is the county seat of Muskogee County. It lies approximately 48 miles (77 km) southeast of Tulsa. The population of the city was 36,878 as of the 2020 census, a 6.0% decrease from 39,223 in 2010.

== History ==
French fur traders were believed to have established a temporary village near the future Muskogee in 1806, but the first permanent European-American settlement was established in 1817 on the south bank of the Verdigris River, north of present-day Muskogee.

After the passage of the Indian Removal Act of 1830 under President Andrew Jackson, the Muscogee Creek Indians were one of the "Five Civilized Tribes" forced out of the American Southeast to Indian Territory. They were accompanied by their slaves. The Indian Agency, a two-story stone building, was built here in Muskogee. It was a site for meetings among the leaders of the Five Civilized Tribes. Today it serves as a museum. At the top of what is known as Agency Hill, it is within Honor Heights Park on the west side of Muskogee.

In 1872, the Missouri–Kansas–Texas Railroad was extended to the area. A federal court was established in Muskogee in 1889, around the same time that Congress opened portions of Indian Territory to non-Native settlers via land rushes. The city was incorporated on March 19, 1898.

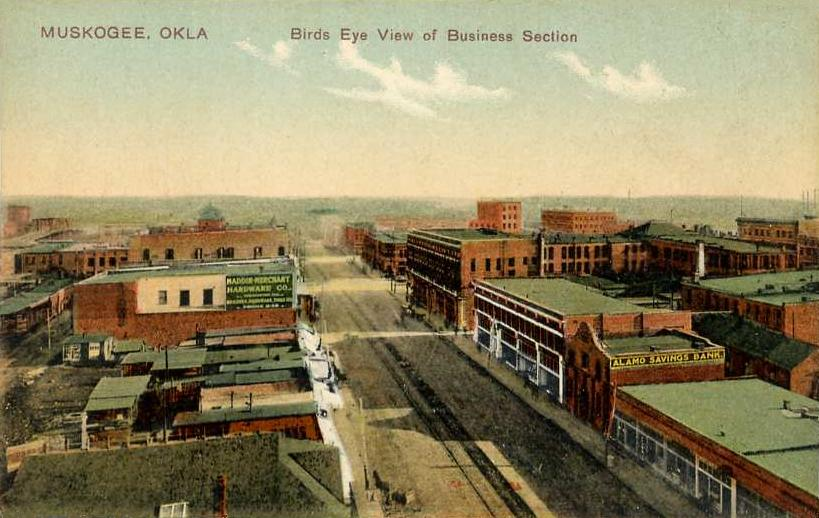
Business district c. 1910

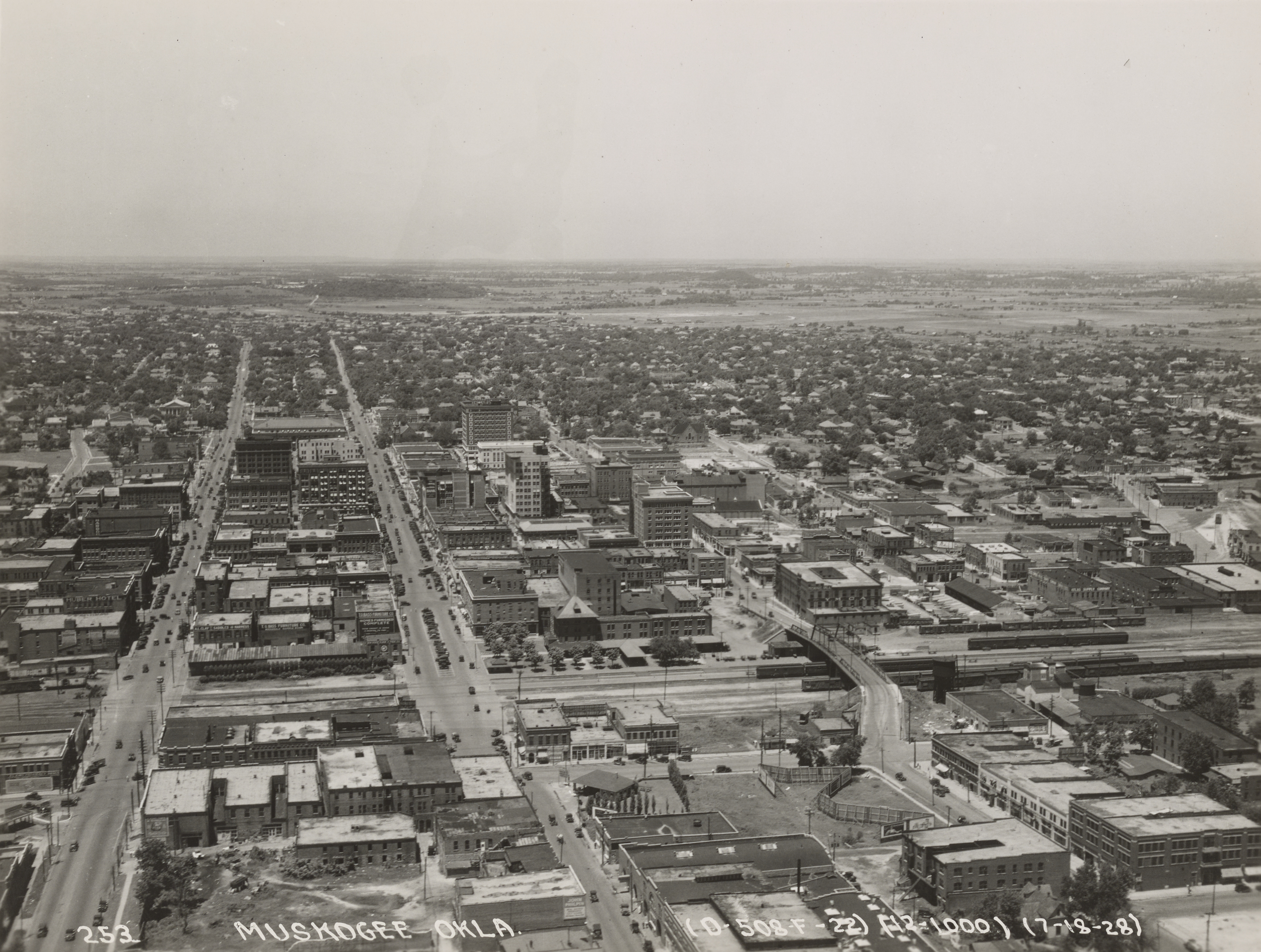
Downtown Muskogee in 1928

Ohio native Charles N. Haskell moved to the city in March 1901. He was instrumental in building on the land rush; he stimulated expansion of the city of more than 4,000 people to a center of business and industry by 1910, with a population of more than 25,000 inhabitants. Haskell built the first five-story business block in Oklahoma Territory; he built and owned fourteen brick buildings in the city. Most importantly, he organized and built most of the railroads running into the city, which connected it to other markets and centers of population, stimulating its business and retail, and attracting new residents.

As Muskogee's economic and business importance grew, so did its political power. In the years before the territory was admitted as a state, the Five Civilized Tribes continued to work on alternatives to keep some independence from European Americans. They met together on August 21, 1905, to propose the State of Sequoyah, to be controlled by Native Americans. They met in Muskogee to draft its constitution, planning to have Muskogee serve as the state's capital. The proposal was vetoed by US President Theodore Roosevelt and mostly ignored by Congress; the proposed State of Sequoyah was never authorized. The US admitted the State of Oklahoma to the Union on November 16, 1907, as the 46th state.

Muskogee was the operational headquarters of the Muskogee Roads, four regional rail carriers under common management. The first was the Midland Valley Railroad, chartered in 1903. The three carriers surviving until 1963 were sold to the Texas & Pacific, which was a subsidiary of the Missouri Pacific Railroad.

Muskogee was on the route of the Jefferson Highway established in 1915. That road ran more than 2,300 miles (3,700 km), from Winnipeg, Manitoba, to New Orleans, Louisiana.

Muskogee attracted national and international attention when, in May 2008, voters elected John Tyler Hammons as mayor. Nineteen years old at the time of his election, Hammons is among the youngest mayors in American history.

On January 20, 2023, at 3:38 AM CST, a slow-moving fireball lit up the sky over Eastern Oklahoma. An accompanying sonic boom was heard by many witnesses in the Oklahoma cities of Bixby, Broken Arrow, Coweta, Wagoner and as far away as Fayetteville, Arkansas. The resulting shockwave shook houses in the affected area, many people reported. Local television station KJRH stated, "Multiple surveillance videos captured the meteor's sights and sounds early Friday morning." Numerous videos of the event were later posted to social media. The meteor survived to relatively low altitudes, breaking apart soon thereafter, raining down numerous meteorite fragments that ultimately reached the ground. Meteorite enthusiasts from around the country quickly converged on the strewnfield, which was scientifically determined to be in an around the Muskogee area. Reality television meteorite hunter Steve Arnold told reporter Jeanette Quezada of KJRH, "We're out here hunting…we're finding rocks."

== Geography ==
According to the U.S. Census Bureau, the city has a total area of 44.5 square miles (115 km^{2}), of which 43.0 square miles (111 km^{2}) are land and 1.5 square miles (3.9 km^{2}), or 3.42%, are water. The confluence of the Arkansas River, Verdigris River and Grand River (Neosho River) is in the northeast corner of the city. Historically, the area around this confluence has been called Three Rivers.

Muskogee lies in the Arkansas River Valley and has a low elevation (600 ft [180 m] above sea level) compared to much of the rest of the state. The city is on the boundary of the oak and hickory forest region of eastern Oklahoma and the prairie, Great Plains region of northeastern Oklahoma. It is 50 miles (80 km) southeast of Tulsa.

=== Climate ===
The city's climate is considerably warmer and more humid than other parts of the state.

According to the Köppen Climate Classification system, Muskogee has a humid subtropical climate, abbreviated "Cfa" on climate maps. The hottest temperature recorded in Muskogee was 118 °F (47.8 °C) on August 10, 1936, while the coldest temperature recorded was −14 °F (−25.6 °C) on February 13, 1905. The city falls within USDA plant hardiness zone 7b (5 to 10 °F; −15 to −12 °C).

Climate data for Muskogee, Oklahoma, 1991–2020 normals, extremes 1905–present
Month	Jan	Feb	Mar	Apr	May	Jun	Jul	Aug	Sep	Oct	Nov	Dec	Year
Record high °F (°C)	81 (27)	90 (32)	93 (34)	97 (36)	98 (37)	108 (42)	114 (46)	118 (48)	109 (43)	98 (37)	88 (31)	83 (28)	118 (48)
Mean maximum °F (°C)	69.6 (20.9)	74.2 (23.4)	81.5 (27.5)	85.7 (29.8)	90.4 (32.4)	94.5 (34.7)	101.4 (38.6)	102.1 (38.9)	95.7 (35.4)	87.8 (31.0)	78.3 (25.7)	69.8 (21.0)	103.3 (39.6)
Mean daily maximum °F (°C)	49.2 (9.6)	54.1 (12.3)	63.2 (17.3)	71.9 (22.2)	79.3 (26.3)	87.7 (30.9)	93.0 (33.9)	92.8 (33.8)	84.8 (29.3)	74.0 (23.3)	61.7 (16.5)	51.5 (10.8)	71.9 (22.2)
Daily mean °F (°C)	37.5 (3.1)	41.9 (5.5)	51.2 (10.7)	59.9 (15.5)	69.0 (20.6)	77.5 (25.3)	82.3 (27.9)	81.2 (27.3)	73.2 (22.9)	61.5 (16.4)	49.8 (9.9)	40.6 (4.8)	60.5 (15.8)
Mean daily minimum °F (°C)	25.8 (−3.4)	29.7 (−1.3)	39.2 (4.0)	47.9 (8.8)	58.7 (14.8)	67.2 (19.6)	71.2 (21.8)	69.7 (20.9)	61.6 (16.4)	49.1 (9.5)	37.9 (3.3)	29.6 (−1.3)	49.0 (9.4)
Mean minimum °F (°C)	12.5 (−10.8)	13.6 (−10.2)	21.3 (−5.9)	31.5 (−0.3)	40.9 (4.9)	55.5 (13.1)	62.0 (16.7)	60.1 (15.6)	46.6 (8.1)	33.3 (0.7)	21.2 (−6.0)	14.2 (−9.9)	8.1 (−13.3)
Record low °F (°C)	−11 (−24)	−14 (−26)	−2 (−19)	21 (−6)	31 (−1)	47 (8)	49 (9)	48 (9)	34 (1)	16 (−9)	10 (−12)	−7 (−22)	−14 (−26)
Average precipitation inches (mm)	1.94 (49)	2.36 (60)	3.09 (78)	4.88 (124)	5.25 (133)	5.00 (127)	3.32 (84)	3.14 (80)	4.31 (109)	4.07 (103)	3.23 (82)	2.56 (65)	43.15 (1,094)
Average snowfall inches (cm)	0.9 (2.3)	0.3 (0.76)	0.5 (1.3)	0.0 (0.0)	0.0 (0.0)	0.0 (0.0)	0.0 (0.0)	0.0 (0.0)	0.0 (0.0)	0.0 (0.0)	0.0 (0.0)	0.9 (2.3)	2.6 (6.66)
Average precipitation days (≥ 0.01 in)	6.4	6.1	8.1	8.3	11.0	8.4	6.0	5.8	8.3	7.3	7.5	6.5	89.7
Average snowy days (≥ 0.1 in)	0.3	0.3	0.3	0.0	0.0	0.0	0.0	0.0	0.0	0.0	0.0	0.4	1.3
Source 1: NOAA
Source 2: National Weather Service

=== Floods ===
Muskogee is a soft spot for floods. In May 2019, waters rose more than 42 feet on the Arkansas River. Those levels had not been reached since 1943 (although 1986 came close with water 39.6 feet high). The U.S.S. Batfish docked at the city's military harbor broke free on the river. Two barges filled with tons of phosphate broke loose and threatened to break the dam they were heading towards. Webber Falls was ordered to evacuate immediately.

== Demographics ==
Historical population
Census	Pop.	Note	%±
1900	4,254		—
1910	25,278		494.2%
1920	30,277		19.8%
1930	32,026		5.8%
1940	32,332		1.0%
1950	37,289		15.3%
1960	38,059		2.1%
1970	37,331		−1.9%
1980	40,011		7.2%
1990	37,708		−5.8%
2000	38,310		1.6%
2010	39,223		2.4%
2020	36,878		−6.0%

=== 2020 census ===
As of the 2020 census, Muskogee had a population of 36,878. The median age was 38.8 years. 24.1% of residents were under the age of 18 and 18.3% of residents were 65 years of age or older. For every 100 females there were 90.8 males, and for every 100 females age 18 and over there were 87.9 males age 18 and over.

96.5% of residents lived in urban areas, while 3.5% lived in rural areas.

There were 14,956 households in Muskogee, of which 30.2% had children under the age of 18 living in them. Of all households, 36.9% were married-couple households, 21.1% were households with a male householder and no spouse or partner present, and 34.8% were households with a female householder and no spouse or partner present. About 34.0% of all households were made up of individuals and 15.0% had someone living alone who was 65 years of age or older.

There were 17,316 housing units, of which 13.6% were vacant. Among occupied housing units, 54.0% were owner-occupied and 46.0% were renter-occupied. The homeowner vacancy rate was 2.4% and the rental vacancy rate was 11.3%.

Racial composition as of the 2020 census
Race	Percent
White	49.3%
Black or African American	14.3%
American Indian and Alaska Native	15.8%
Asian	1.0%
Native Hawaiian and Other Pacific Islander	0.1%
Some other race	4.7%
Two or more races	14.8%
Hispanic or Latino (of any race)	9.4%

=== 2000 census ===
As of the census of 2000, there were 38,310 people, 15,523 households, and 9,950 families residing in the city. The population density was 1,026.0 inhabitants per square mile (396.1/km^{2}). There were 17,517 housing units at an average density of 469.1 per square mile (181.1/km^{2}). The racial makeup of the city was 61.12% White, 17.90% African American, 12.34% Native American, 0.90% Asian, 0.02% Pacific Islander, 1.57% from other races, and 6.16% from two or more races. Hispanic or Latino of any race were 3.28% of the population.

There were 15,523 households, out of which 29.3% had children under the age of 18 living with them, 45.2% were married couples living together, 15.4% had a female householder with no husband present, and 35.9% were non-families. 31.8% of all households were made up of individuals, and 14.8% had someone living alone who was 65 years of age or older. The average household size was 2.39 and the average family size was 3.00.

In the city the population was spread out, with 25.7% under the age of 18, 9.7% from 18 to 24, 25.8% from 25 to 44, 21.4% from 45 to 64, and 17.4% who were 65 years of age or older. The median age was 37 years. For every 100 females, there were 88.8 males. For every 100 females age 18 and over, there were 83.4 males.

The median income for a household in the city was $26,418, and the median income for a family was $33,358. Males had a median income of $28,153 versus $20,341 for females. The per capita income for the city was $15,351. About 14.6% of families and 19.2% of the population were below the poverty line, including 25.9% of those under age 18 and 14.3% of those age 65 or over.

=== Crime ===
Since 1995, the crime rate has reduced by 45 percent in Muskogee. According to records by the Oklahoma State Bureau of Investigation, in 2002, 2008 and 2009, no murders were committed for the entire year. However, on April 10, 2010, a deadly shooting broke out at the Arrowhead Mall, injuring at least five people and leaving one dead; witnesses say that the shooting was gang-related.

On February 2, 2021, a mass murder occurred when a gunman opened fire at a home, killing six people, including five children, and one woman was seriously injured.

== Economy ==
Muskogee is an economic center for eastern Oklahoma, and is home to several industrial activities. Georgia-Pacific has a tissue, paper towel, and napkin manufacturing plant in Muskogee. The 2.9 million square foot facility is Muskogee's largest employer with 800 workers.

On January 22, 2025, ground was broken on the Stardust Power Inc. $1.2 billion lithium refinery in Muskogee, near the Port of Muskogee. The initial production line will produce up to 25,000 metric tons of battery-grade lithium per year, with a projected second phase doubling that capacity.

On November 20, 2025, Google announced two new data centers to be built in the Muskogee area, one near Summit about 7 miles south, and one in Council Hill about 25 miles southeast, on hundreds of acres of land each. This forms a part of an investment of $9 billion that Google is spreading across several Oklahoma sites.

== Arts and culture ==
Muskogee is home to Honor Heights Park, a World War I memorial park. It is planted with azaleas and hosts the annual Azalea Festival each April. During the winter, Honor Heights is transformed into the Garden of Lights, a 132-acre (0.53 km^{2}) Christmas lights display.

Muskogee has six museums. The Five Civilized Tribes Museum preserves the art and culture of the Five Civilized Tribes. The U.S.S. Batfish and War Memorial Park's major attraction is the submarine USS Batfish. The Three Rivers Museum chronicles the history of the Three Rivers area and the railroads that helped create it. The Oklahoma Music Hall of Fame has been honoring Oklahoma musicians since 1997. The Thomas-Foreman Historic Home, aka the Grant Foreman House is an 1898 farm house preserved with the furnishings of the Indian Territory Judge John R. Thomas and his daughter and son-in-law Grant and Carolyn Foreman, Oklahoma historians and authors. The Ataloa Lodge is on the campus of Bacone College.

Muskogee is home to The Castle of Muskogee. The Castle hosts Fourth of July Fireworks sales, a Halloween festival 'Haunted Castle', a drive-through Christmas Kingdom and indoor Castle Christmas experience, and the Oklahoma Renaissance Festival, founded in 1995. The Renaissance festival draws in tens of thousands each year, hosting jousts, dancing, vendors and other events.

Muskogee Little Theatre was established in 1972, and performs eight shows per year.

The City of Muskogee Foundation provides grants to community organizations and non-profit groups throughout the Muskogee community.

=== Points of interest ===
- Arrowhead Mall
- Ataloa Lodge Museum
- Azalea Festival
- Five Civilized Tribes Museum
- Grant Foreman House
- Honor Heights Park
- Oklahoma Music Hall of Fame
- Port of Muskogee
- River Country Family Water Park
- Three Forks Harbor
- Three Rivers Museum
- Thunderbird Speedway
- USS Batfish (SS-310)
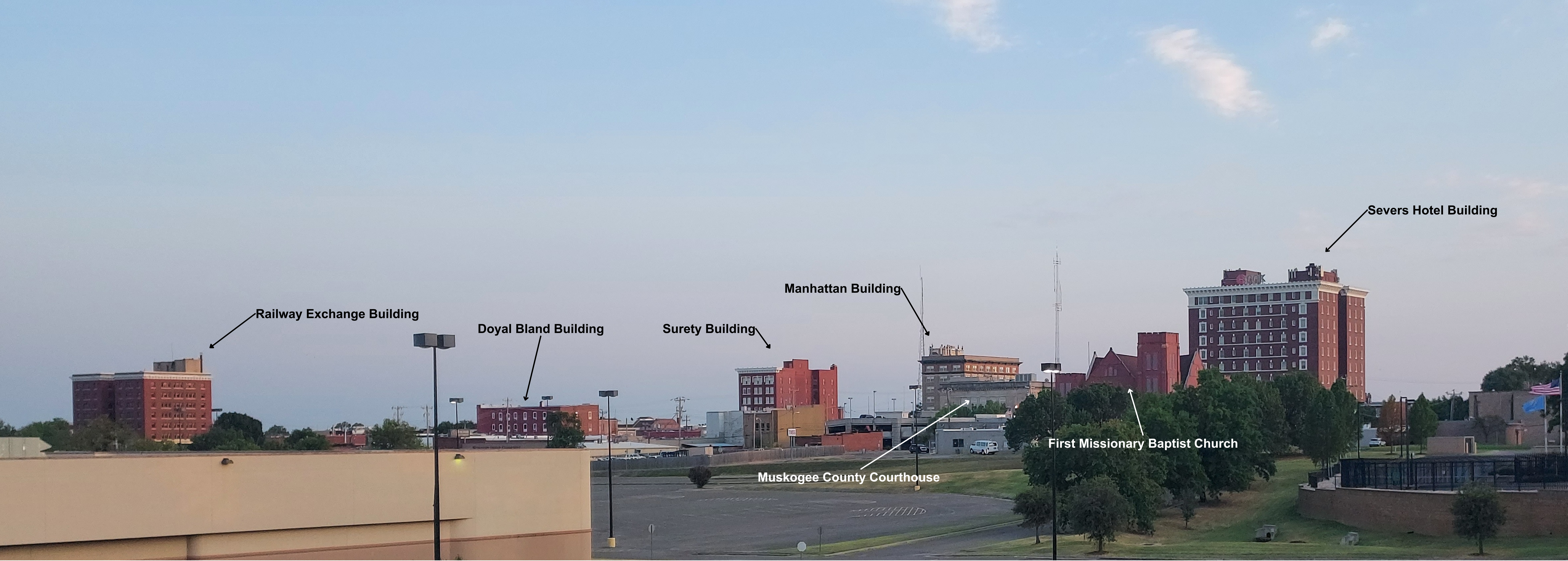
Downtown Muskogee skyline with building labels

== Sports ==
Muskogee was home to minor league baseball from 1905 to 1957. Changing monikers frequently, Muskogee hosted the Muskogee Reds (1905), Muskogee Indians (1906), Muskogee Redskins (1907–1908), Muskogee Navigators (1909–1910), Muskogee Redskins (1911), Muskogee Indians (1912), Muskogee Mets (1914–1916), Muskogee Reds (1917), Muskogee Mets (1921–1923), Muskogee Athletics (1924–1926), Muskogee Chiefs (1927–1932), Muskogee Oilers (1933), Muskogee Tigers (1934–1936), Muskogee Reds (1937–1942, 1946–1950) and Muskogee Giants (1951–1957).

Muskogee teams played were members of the Missouri Valley League (1905), South Central League (1906), Oklahoma-Arkansas-Kansas League (1907–1908), Western Association (1909–1911), Oklahoma State League (1912), Western Association (1914–1916–1917), Southwestern League (1921–1923), Western Association (1924–1932), Western League (1933), Western Association (1934–1942, 1946–1954) and Sooner State League (1955–1957).

Three Baseball Hall of Fame inductees played for Muskogee. Bill Dickey played for the 1926 Muskogee Athletics. Bobby Wallace was a player/manager for the 1921 Muskogee Mets. Rube Marquard was a player/manager for the 1933 Muskogee Oilers.

Muskogee was an affiliate of the St. Louis Browns (1932, 1947–1949), Cincinnati Reds (1937–1939), Chicago Cubs (1941), Detroit Tigers (1946) and New York Giants (1936, 1951–1957).

Muskogee teams played at Traction Park from 1905 to 1911. Muskogee then played at Owen Field, which was later renamed to League Park and finally Athletic Park. In April 1923, Babe Ruth with the New York Yankees played an exhibition game at Owen Field against the Brooklyn Dodgers. Later, Mickey Mantle played at Athletic Park in 1950 for the Joplin Miners in games against Muskogee. Traction Park was located in Hyde Park. Today, the Owen Field/League Park/Athletic Park site is occupied by the Muskogee Civic Center.

Muskogee Country Club (Muskogee Golf Club) played host to the 1970 U.S. Women's Open golf tournament won by Donna Caponi.

== Government ==
Muskogee is governed by a council–manager form of municipal government. The city manager is the administrative leader of the government and is appointed by the city council. The city's ceremonial head is the mayor, who is a voting, at-large member of the council with limited administrative power.

The city is divided into four wards, with two members of the city council elected from each. Each member of the council is elected by the city as a whole but must reside in a specific ward. Elections are held on the first Tuesday in April in each even-numbered year. All elections are non-partisan; the mayor and the members of the city council receive no salary or compensation for their services.

=== State and federal representation ===
Muskogee is represented by two state representatives for House Districts 13 and 14. District 13 includes the west side of Muskogee while District 14 includes the east half of Muskogee. The city is represented in the state senate in Senate District 9, which includes all of Muskogee County, Oklahoma.

Both former Attorney General of Oklahoma Drew Edmondson and former Oklahoma Superintendent of Public Instruction Sandy Garrett are Muskogee natives.

The city is part of Oklahoma's 2nd congressional district. The city is also home to former U.S. Senator Tom Coburn.

The city is home to the United States District Court for the Eastern District of Oklahoma.

== Education ==
Muskogee Public Schools includes the vast majority of the city limits and a large portion of Muskogee County. Hilldale Public Schools covers a small southern portion of the city limits and some parts of the County south of Muskogee. Fort Gibson Public Schools includes some areas in the east. Muskogee is also home to the Oklahoma School for the Blind, a special institution for meeting the educational needs of blind and visually impaired students residing in the state of Oklahoma. Previous institutions that where located in the city were Harrell International Institute and its successors, Spaulding Institute and Spaulding Female College, as well as Nazareth Institute.

Muskogee has three institutions of higher education: the public four-year Northeastern State University, the public two-year Connors State College, and the public Indian Capital Technology Center. A fourth institution, the private four-year Bacone College, which was the oldest college in the state of Oklahoma, suspended operations for the spring semester of 2024, filed for bankruptcy, and is being liquidated.

In 2004, civic rights lawyers took on the case of 11-year-old Nashala Hearn who sued the Muskogee, Oklahoma, Public School District for ordering her to remove her hijab because it was violative of the school's dress code. She refused to submit and was subsequently suspended twice. The court-ordered agreement reached by the Justice Department with the school board permits Nashala, and any other child in Muskogee whose religious beliefs and practices conflict with the school dress code, to receive an accommodation.

== Media ==
The local paper, the Muskogee Phoenix, was founded in February 1888 when Oklahoma was still a territory.

Movies filmed Muskogee include:

- Jim Thorpe – All-American (1951), filmed partly at Bacone Indian College and Indian Bowl Stadium.
- Denizen (2010).
- American Honey (2016).

== Infrastructure ==
=== Transportation ===
The town is served by U.S. Route 62, U.S. Route 64, U.S. Route 69, Oklahoma State Highway 16, Oklahoma State Highway 165, and Oklahoma State Highway 351 (the Muskogee Turnpike).

Muskogee-Davis Regional Airport, five miles south of downtown, has a paved main runway measuring 7202 feet by 150 feet, and can accommodate light planes through heavy transport-type jet aircraft. The airport had commercial air service from Central Airlines in the 1960s.

Commercial air transportation is available at Tulsa International Airport, about 49 miles to the northwest.

Railroad freight service to Muskogee is provided by Union Pacific, and Burlington Northern Santa Fe railroads over several lines constructed by various predecessor companies, also connecting with the Port of Muskogee railroad.

Muskogee operates the Port of Muskogee on the McClellan–Kerr Arkansas River Navigation System, which grants water access to and from the Gulf of Mexico.

== Notable people ==
- Reubin Askew, Governor of Florida 1971 to 1979
- Randy Ball, college football head coach, Western Illinois, Missouri State
- Louis W. Ballard, Cherokee and Osage composer and inductee, Oklahoma Music Hall of Fame
- R. Perry Beaver, Principal Chief of the Muscogee (Creek) Nation
- Maurice R. Bebb, etcher and printmaker
- Aaron Bell, jazz double-bassist
- Keith Birdsong, illustrator known for his Star Trek novel covers
- Tams Bixby, newspaper owner and publisher of Muskogee Phoenix; chairman of Dawes Commission, which he relocated to Muskogee; lived in Muskogee from 1905 to 1922.
- Archie Bradley, Major League Baseball pitcher
- Don Byas, jazz musician
- Kristin Cast, writer
- PC Cast, writer
- Eddie Chuculate, author, graduate of Muskogee High School
- Tom Coburn, former U.S. Senator from Oklahoma
- Isaac N. Coggs, Wisconsin State Assembly
- Fletcher Daniels, Missouri state representative
- Nelson Dean, Negro League baseball player
- Drew Edmondson, former Attorney General of Oklahoma, 2018 gubernatorial candidate
- Ed Edmondson, U.S. Congressman from Oklahoma
- James E. Edmondson, current Oklahoma Supreme Court Justice
- Ernest E. Evans, posthumous Medal of Honor recipient for actions as U.S. destroyer captain in WWII
- George Faught, Former Representative from Oklahoma State House District 14; first Republican in state history to represent Muskogee-based district
- Carolyn T. Foreman (1872–1967), historian, wife of Grant Foreman and daughter of John R. Thomas; lived in Muskogee (1887–1967)
- Sandy Garrett, former Oklahoma Superintendent of Public Instruction and Hilldale Public School teacher
- Susan Golding, former mayor of San Diego, California
- Nellie Weaver Greene (1870s–1957), educator, clubwoman
- Gloria Greer, actress
- Clu Gulager, actor
- Charles V. Hamilton, political scientist
- John Tyler Hammons, former mayor of Muskogee and one of youngest mayors in United States history
- Charles N. Haskell, noted lawyer, oilman, statesman, and first Governor of Oklahoma
- Darnell Hinson, former professional basketball player
- David R. Hinson, pilot and former head of Midway Airlines
- Lance Hinson, college football coach
- Harold L. Holliday, Missouri state representative
- Olivia Hooker, psychologist, educator
- Leroy Hurte (1915–2011), musician, businessman
- James Jabara, first American jet ace
- Dennis Jernigan, contemporary Christian music singer/songwriter
- James R. Jones, U.S. Congressman for Oklahoma's 1st District (1973–1987), Chairman of the American Stock Exchange (1989 to 1993), U.S. Ambassador to Mexico (1993 to 1997)
- L. R. Kershaw, lawyer, banker, cattle breeder, real estate developer and candidate for governor
- Barney Kessel, jazz guitarist
- Leo Kottke, acoustic guitarist
- Robert E. Lavender, former Oklahoma Supreme Court Justice
- Seth Littrell, football head coach, North Texas
- Barbara McAlister (opera singer), opera singer
- Roberta McCain, mother of Senator John McCain
- Calvin McCarty, professional Canadian football running back for CFL's Edmonton Eskimos
- Jay McShann, jazz musician
- Bill Mercer, sportscaster, educator and author
- William Nigh, politician
- Smokie Norful, Gospel recording artist
- Kevin Peterson, American football player
- Pleasant Porter, principal chief of Creek Nation (1899 – 1907) and president of Sequoyah Constitutional Convention
- Alexander Posey, writer, newspaper editor, secretary of the Sequoyah Constitutional Convention
- Joe A. Rector, American/Cherokee artist
- Robert Reed, actor who played Mike Brady, father on The Brady Bunch
- Bass Reeves, one of the first African-American Deputy U.S. Marshals, who served at the Muskogee Federal Court in Indian Territory, and later became an officer of the Muskogee Police Department
- Alice Mary Robertson, educator, social worker, government official, second woman to serve in the United States Congress
- Muskogee Yargee Ross, pioneer resident
- Pee Wee Russell, jazz musician
- Thomas Ryan, politician, lawyer, lived in Muskogee as representative from Secretary of the Interior
- A. G. W. Sango, lawyer, newspaper editor, school founder
- James M. Shackelford, first United States judge in Indian Territory (1889–1907)
- Jackie Shipp, former NFL player
- The Swon Brothers, duo that gained fame on NBC's The Voice (season 4)
- Mike Synar, former U.S. Representative from Oklahoma
- John R. Thomas, attorney, Federal judge before Oklahoma statehood, father of historian Carolyn T. Foreman
- Carrie Underwood, country music singer
- Sarah Vowell, author
- Les Walrond, Major League Baseball player
- W. Richard West Jr., director of National Museum of the American Indian
- Claude "Fiddler" Williams, jazz musician

== In popular culture ==
- Muskogee was commemorated in the 1969 Merle Haggard song "Okie from Muskogee".
