= National Register of Historic Places listings in Creek County, Oklahoma =

Location of Creek County in Oklahoma

This is a list of the National Register of Historic Places listings in Creek County, Oklahoma.

This is intended to be a complete list of the properties and districts on the National Register of Historic Places in Creek County, Oklahoma, United States. The locations of National Register properties and districts for which the latitude and longitude coordinates are included below, may be seen in a map.

There are 31 properties and districts listed on the National Register in the county.

This National Park Service list is complete through NPS recent listings posted November 6, 2026.

== Current listings ==
	Name on the Register	Image	Date listed	Location	City or town	Description
1	Jackson Barnett No. 11 Oil Well		July 27, 1982 (#82003681)	South of Drumright; 35°58′26″N 96°35′04″W	Drumright	
2	Beard Motor Company	Beard Motor Company	May 27, 2004 (#04000522)	210 E. 9th 35°50′08″N 96°23′16″W	Bristow	The Chrysler Tower portion was relocated two blocks closer to Route 66, the project finished in April of 2026.
3	Berryhill Building	Berryhill Building	November 30, 1999 (#99001423)	14-20 E. Dewey Ave. 35°59′54″N 96°06′47″W	Sapulpa	
4	Bridge No. 18 at Rock Creek	Bridge No. 18 at Rock Creek	February 23, 1995 (#95000031)	Junction of Old U.S. Route 66 and Rock Creek; 35°59′37″N 96°08′11″W	Sapulpa	1921 Ozark Trail Warren truss bridge, part of U.S. Route 66 in Oklahoma until a 1952 realignment, closed to traffic as of 2013.
5	Bristow Firestone Service Station	Bristow Firestone Service Station	September 6, 2007 (#07000912)	321 N. Main; 35°50′07″N 96°23′25″W	Bristow	
6	Bristow Motor Company Building	Bristow Motor Company Building	February 23, 1995 (#95000032)	500 N. Main St. 35°50′13″N 96°23′27″W	Bristow	
7	Bristow Presbyterian Church	Bristow Presbyterian Church	October 3, 1979 (#79001992)	6th and Elm Sts. 35°49′57″N 96°23′35″W	Bristow	
8	Bristow Tire Shop	Bristow Tire Shop	February 23, 1995 (#95000033)	115 W. 4th St. 35°49′51″N 96°23′29″W	Bristow	
9	Creek County Courthouse	Creek County Courthouse	March 22, 1985 (#85000679)	222 E. Dewey Ave. 35°59′54″N 96°06′37″W	Sapulpa	
10	Creek Masonic Lodge No. 226	Creek Masonic Lodge No. 226	March 20, 2017 (#100000768)	417 N. Main St. 35°50′11″N 96°23′28″W	Bristow	
11	Depew Route 66 Segment	Depew Route 66 Segment	September 10, 2014 (#14000593)	US 66 E. from Milfay Rd. for .46 mi. 35°47′11″N 96°33′41″W	Depew vicinity	
12	Drumright Gasoline Plant No. 2		July 27, 1982 (#82003677)	North of Drumright; 36°00′33″N 96°34′57″W	Drumright	
13	Aaron Drumright House	Aaron Drumright House	August 17, 1982 (#82003678)	403 S. Creek Ave. 35°59′08″N 96°36′24″W	Drumright	Fire damaged by October of 2022
14	First United Methodist Church of Drumright	First United Methodist Church of Drumright	March 31, 1982 (#82003679)	115 N. Pennsylvania Ave. 35°59′21″N 96°36′07″W	Drumright	
15	John Frank House	John Frank House	March 20, 2002 (#02000221)	1300 Luker Ln. 35°59′08″N 96°06′10″W	Sapulpa	
16	J.W. Fulkerson House		March 23, 1982 (#82003680)	508 E Broadway; 35°59′18″N 96°35′43″W	Drumright	No longer extant per Google Street View.
17	House Building	House Building	September 9, 2020 (#100005554)	301-305 North Main St. 35°50′06″N 96°23′28″W	Bristow	
18	Klingensmith Park Amphitheater	Klingensmith Park Amphitheater	September 12, 2016 (#16000619)	W. 7th, W. 5th & Country Club Dr. 35°49′57″N 96°24′08″W	Bristow	
19	Little Deep Fork Creek Bridge	Little Deep Fork Creek Bridge	December 5, 2003 (#03001237)	0.33 miles east of the junction of E0830 Rd. and N3700 Rd. 35°48′49″N 96°26′06″W	Bristow	
20	Markham School and Teacherage		April 21, 1982 (#82003683)	Southwest of Oilton; 36°03′39″N 96°36′25″W	Oilton	
21	McClung House	McClung House	June 27, 1980 (#80003262)	18 W. Goodykoontz Ave. 35°59′26″N 96°06′51″W	Sapulpa	Moved in 2004 from 708 S. Main St.
22	Meacham Building	Meacham Building	April 21, 1982 (#82003682)	102 E. Main St. 36°05′12″N 96°35′07″W	Oilton	
23	St. George Episcopal Church	St. George Episcopal Church	May 1, 2024 (#100010278)	148 West 7th Street; 35°50′02″N 96°23′33″W	Bristow	
24	Santa Fe Depot	Santa Fe Depot	April 2, 1981 (#81000460)	Broadway and Harley Sts. 35°59′20″N 96°35′53″W	Drumright	
25	Sapulpa Downtown Historic District	Sapulpa Downtown Historic District	September 14, 2002 (#02000975)	Roughly bounded by Hobson Ave., Elm St., Lee Ave., and Main St. 35°59′54″N 96°06′43″W	Sapulpa	
26	Tank Farm Loop Route 66 Roadbed	Tank Farm Loop Route 66 Roadbed	September 6, 2006 (#06000797)	Junction of State Highway 66 and Old U.S. Route 66, 0.6 miles west of the Interstate 44 overpass 35°54′33″N 96°18′50″W	Bristow	
27	Texaco Service Station	Texaco Service Station	February 23, 1995 (#95000034)	201 W. 4th Ave. 35°49′51″N 96°23′36″W	Bristow	
28	Tidal School	Tidal School	April 2, 1981 (#81000461)	South of Drumright off State Highway 16; 35°57′46″N 96°35′04″W	Drumright	now Tidewater Winery
29	Washington School		January 28, 1981 (#81000462)	214 W. Federal St. 35°59′13″N 96°36′11″W	Drumright	Demolished
30	West Sapulpa Route 66 Roadbed	West Sapulpa Route 66 Roadbed	March 3, 2004 (#04000128)	Junction of Ozark Trail of State Highway 66, 0.25 miles west of Sahoma Lake Rd. 35°59′31″N 96°09′45″W	Sapulpa	
31	Wheeler No. 1 Oil Well		March 14, 1983 (#83002083)	Off State Highway 99; 35°59′58″N 96°35′50″W	Drumright	

== See also ==
- List of National Historic Landmarks in Oklahoma
- National Register of Historic Places listings in Oklahoma
