= Shamrock, Oklahoma =

Town in Oklahoma, US

- Town
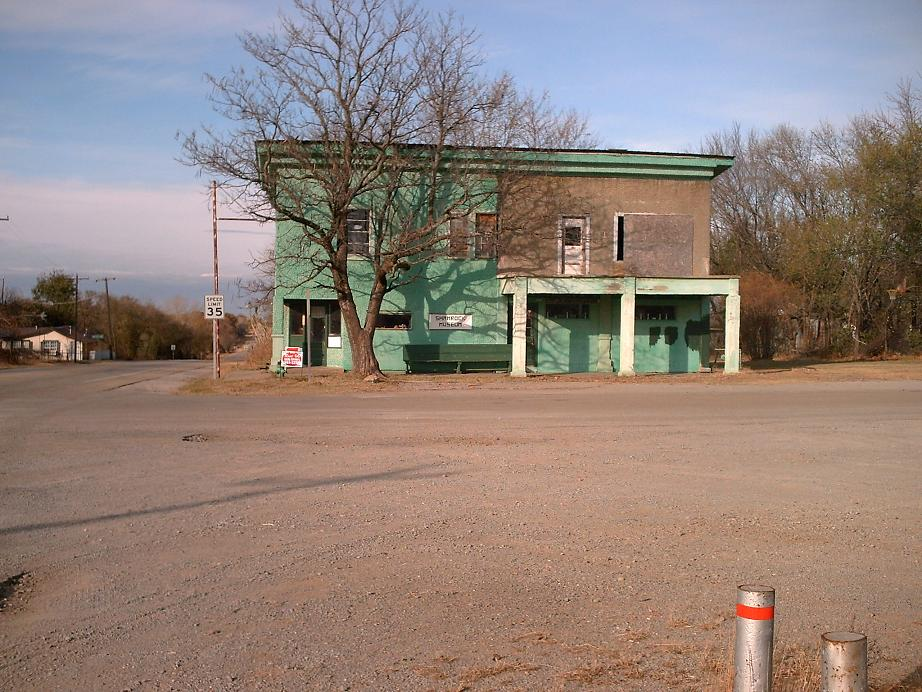
- The Shamrock Museum building was originally a general store.

- Location within Creek County, and the state of Oklahoma
- Coordinates: 35°54′41″N 96°34′38″W
- Country: United States
- State: Oklahoma
- County: Creek

Area
  - Total: 0.33 sq mi (0.85 km^{2})
  - Land: 0.33 sq mi (0.85 km^{2})
  - Water: 0 sq mi (0.00 km^{2})
- Elevation: 991 ft (302 m)

Population (2020)
  - Total: 65
  - Density: 198.1/sq mi (76.47/km^{2})
- Time zone: UTC-6 (Central (CST))
  - Summer (DST): UTC-5 (CDT)
- ZIP code: 74068
- Area codes: 539/918
- FIPS code: 40-66600
- GNIS feature ID: 2413276

Shamrock (Meskwaki: Shêmwâkeki) is an unincorporated town in Creek County, Oklahoma, United States, located on Oklahoma State Highway 16 south of Drumright and west-northwest of Bristow. The population was 65 at the time of the 2020 census. It was named for Shamrock, Illinois (just southeast of Bloomington), the hometown of local store owner, James M. Thomas.

== History ==
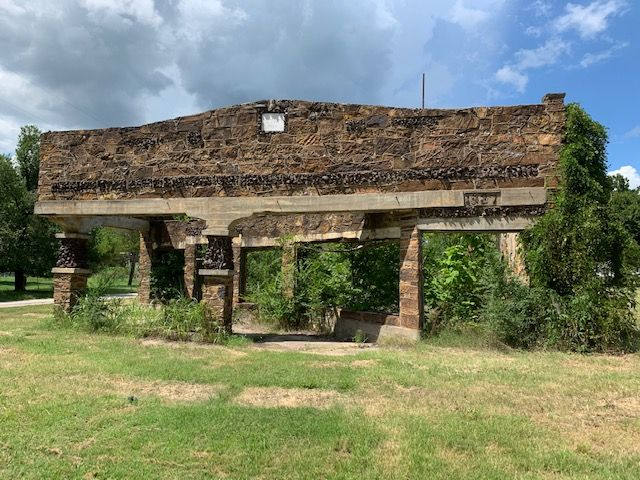
Building from 1927, said to be an abandoned auto dealership.

In 1908, James M. Thomas, a native of Shamrock, Illinois, moved to this area and opened a store. He named the post office that he established on July 9, 1910, in honor of his home town. Between 1915 and 1916, the Sapulpa and Oil Field Railroad (later the St. Louis and San Francisco Railway) built a line northward from Depew to Shamrock. The railroad bypassed the town by three quarters of a mile, so the citizens moved their businesses closer to the railroad. In 1916, the Atchison, Topeka and Santa Fe Railway constructed a line that connected Shamrock and Drumright. These lines developed Shamrock as a major shipping point for oil field equipment and crude oil. The town adopted an Irish theme, with streets named Tipperary, Dublin, Killarney, Blarney, and Cork.

Shamrock became quite the oil and gas boomtown when the nearby Cushing Oil Field began to develop. Numerous oilfield camps began to spring up in the vicinity, and Shamrock developed a reputation as a bawdy town with saloons, gambling halls, and brothels. Colorful stories abound. Two noted oilmen, Tom Slick and Harry Sinclair, had a few drinks one night and were racing horse teams up and down Shamrock's main street. The Big Six gambling hall had a one-legged fiddle player who was known to take off his wooden leg and use it as a club to keep order in the place. However, the oil boom and its workers started moving to new areas in the mid-1920s, and Shamrock began to shrink. Still, the town was exciting enough in 1932 to have its bank robbed by Pretty Boy Floyd.

Shamrock at one point had two weekly newspapers. One was the Shamrock Brogue. The editorial in the first issue dated January 1, 1916, summarized the paper's view and intent: "Shamrock is on the map to stay and the Brogue is here to boost for the town. The Brogue will never knock. The mission of a newspaper is to boost for its own home town first, last and all the time, and that is the program that the Brogue will follow." The other paper was the Shamrock Blarney, first printed on March 9, 1916. Both papers were succeeded by the Creek County Democrat, which published to at least January 23, 1930.

The board of trustees voted to dissolve the town in June 2010.

== Geography ==
According to the United States Census Bureau, the town has a total area of 0.3 square miles (0.78 km^{2}), all land.

== Demographics ==
Historical population
| Census | Pop. | Note | %± |
|---|---|---|---|
| 2020 | 65 | | — |
U.S. Decennial Census

=== 2020 census ===
As of the 2020 census, Shamrock had a population of 65. The median age was 36.3 years. 29.2% of residents were under the age of 18 and 20.0% of residents were 65 years of age or older. For every 100 females there were 97.0 males, and for every 100 females age 18 and over there were 119.0 males age 18 and over.

0.0% of residents lived in urban areas, while 100.0% lived in rural areas.

There were 30 households in Shamrock, of which 30.0% had children under the age of 18 living in them. Of all households, 66.7% were married-couple households, 13.3% were households with a male householder and no spouse or partner present, and 16.7% were households with a female householder and no spouse or partner present. About 23.3% of all households were made up of individuals and 10.0% had someone living alone who was 65 years of age or older.

There were 36 housing units, of which 16.7% were vacant. The homeowner vacancy rate was 0.0% and the rental vacancy rate was 0.0%.

Racial composition as of the 2020 census
| Race | Number | Percent |
|---|---|---|
| White | 49 | 75.4% |
| Black or African American | 0 | 0.0% |
| American Indian and Alaska Native | 6 | 9.2% |
| Asian | 0 | 0.0% |
| Native Hawaiian and Other Pacific Islander | 0 | 0.0% |
| Some other race | 0 | 0.0% |
| Two or more races | 10 | 15.4% |
| Hispanic or Latino (of any race) | 0 | 0.0% |

=== 2000 census ===
As of the census of 2000, there were 125 people, 47 households, and 29 families residing in the town. The population density was 379.2 inhabitants per square mile (146.4/km^{2}). There were 70 housing units at an average density of 212.3 per square mile (82.0/km^{2}). The racial makeup of the town was 89.60% White, 8.80% Native American, and 1.60% from two or more races. Hispanic or Latino of any race were 0.80% of the population.

There were 47 households, out of which 31.9% had children under the age of 18 living with them, 48.9% were married couples living together, 10.6% had a female householder with no husband present, and 36.2% were non-families. 23.4% of all households were made up of individuals, and 8.5% had someone living alone who was 65 years of age or older. The average household size was 2.66 and the average family size was 3.33.

In the town, the population was spread out, with 35.2% under the age of 18, 4.0% from 18 to 24, 26.4% from 25 to 44, 20.0% from 45 to 64, and 14.4% who were 65 years of age or older. The median age was 35 years. For every 100 females, there were 104.9 males. For every 100 females age 18 and over, there were 92.9 males.

The median income for a household in the town was $21,250, and the median income for a family was $21,875. Males had a median income of $22,917 versus $15,000 for females. The per capita income for the town was $9,948. There were 20.6% of families and 29.5% of the population living below the poverty line, including 36.2% of under eighteens and 6.3% of those over 64.

== Education ==
It is in the Drumright Public Schools school district.
