= Thomas Slick (disambiguation) =

Thomas Slick or Tom Slick may refer to:

- Tom Slick (1916–1962), San Antonio, Texas-based inventor, businessman, adventurer, and heir to an oil business
- Thomas Baker Slick Sr. (1883–1930), oilman known as "The King of the Wildcatters"
- Tom Slick (TV series), a series of shorts that aired on ABC in 1967
- Thomas Whitten Slick (1869–1959), U.S. federal judge
