= Albert A. Rollestone =

American oil industry business executive

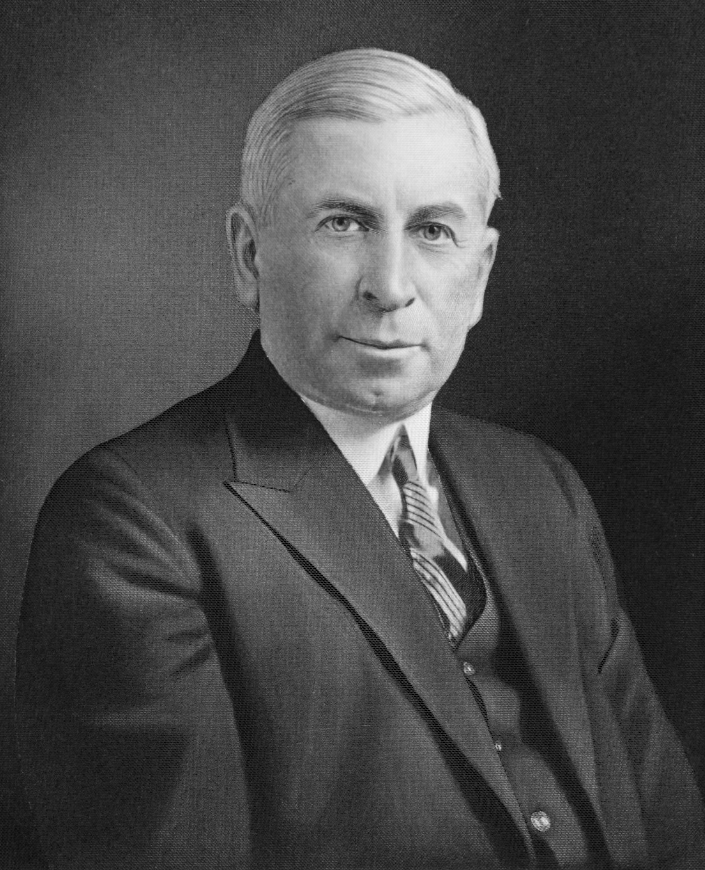
- Born: Albert Andrew Thomas Rollestone; March 24, 1866; County Tyrone, Ireland
- Died: April 4, 1952 (aged 86); Tulsa, Oklahoma, United States
- Occupations: Oilman, businessman, philanthropist
- Known for: Helped fund a modern education institution in Iran in the beginning of the 20th century

Albert Andrew Thomas Rollestone (1866–1952) was an American oil pioneer and Presbyterian philanthropist based in Oklahoma. As part of his Presbyterian philanthropy, Rollestone helped fund the first institution of modern education in Iran at the turn of the 20th century. Rollestone provided funding for the iconic central building of Alborz College, Iran's model of modern education.

== The early years ==
Albert A. Rollestone, an immigrant to the US, was a businessman who took many years to earn his fortune and it was dramatically symbolized by a spectacular oil gusher he drilled in Bristow, Oklahoma (30 miles southwest of Tulsa).

He was born in County Tyrone, Ireland on March 24, 1866, into a Presbyterian family. At 17, he left for the South African diamond mines. He then moved to Colorado where he became a banker and was considered a prominent figure in gold and silver mining. With the decline in the Colorado gold rush he left first for Tulsa, Oklahoma. It is said Rollestone was broke when he finally arrived in Bristow, Oklahoma, but his luck was about to change.

== Business ventures ==
He started his first oil company Continental Petroleum with his son Edwin and partner Claude Freeland, an expert in oil drilling. He later sold this company for $5,000,000 to Transcontinental Oil Company. Having reserved certain properties from the sale he created the Roland Oil Company with the same partners and continued to drill successfully until the decline in 1924.

When Roland Company drilled "The Big Alec" this was the culminating event that brought Rollestone almost legendary status. At first it blew spectacularly wild at more than 20,000 barrels (3,200 m^{3}) a day. Once contained it began flowing at 8,000-10,000 barrels (1,600 m^{3}) per day and it was the second largest in Oklahoma's history at that time. It brought bus loads of people from Tulsa, attracted drilling companies, and initiated an oil boom in the Bristow region and town. One of the oil publications had this to say about Roland's principals:

The owners Messrs. Rollestone and Freeland are as free from ostentation as though neither had ever accomplished what other people have only hoped to do; namely break the record for big production in this state, and they are certainly entitled to the congratulations of every man in Oklahoma because they are putting Oklahoma on the map as it has never been before…

== Philanthropic ventures ==
The earnings of Roland Company made it possible for both Rollestone and partner Freeland to demonstrate their interest in giving back to the community and as devout Presbyterians, they donated the land and loaned $200,000 to build the first Presbyterian Church in Bristow.

It would also have been during this time that Rollestone's notoriety as a well-heeled Presbyterian would have caught the eye of Dr. Robert E. Speers (1867–1947), Secretary of the American Presbyterian Mission based in New York. He was an expert on missions worldwide and visited missions in Persia and China where Rollestone's sister, Lavinia served for thirty years. Both were men of faith and attuned to the Presbyterian's key work in education abroad. Dr. Speer persuaded Rollestone to pay a princely sum to underwrite the cost of Alborz College's central campus building. There is no evidence that Mr. Rollestone ever visited Persia or even met the visionary President of Alborz College, Presbyterian missionary Dr. Samuel M. Jordan.

After the Bristow oil boom peaked in 1924 Rollestone and his partner Freeland went their separate ways. Rollestone moved back to Colorado intending to make it an oil state too. But far from discovering an historically large gusher, he almost held the record for the deepest dry well ever dug. Wildcatting at this time produced 1 out of 9 wells but a determined Rollestone continued until his resources were depleted. He retired with his sister Lavinia in Tulsa where he served as an elder at the First Presbyterian Church. Rollestone had divorced his wife in Colorado before moving to Bristow in 1915 and never remarried. He endured the tragic loss of his son Edwin through his suicide during the Great Depression. A. A. Rollestone died in Tulsa on April 4, 1952, at the age of 86. He is buried in Bristow next to his son Edwin and sister Lavinia. The Tulsa Tribune summarized his life poignantly describing Rollestone as: "a picturesque figure, a man who made millions only to lose them or give them away in philanthropy."

== See also ==
- National Register of Historic Places listings in Creek County, Oklahoma
