= Bristow Tire Shop =

- U.S. National Register of Historic Places
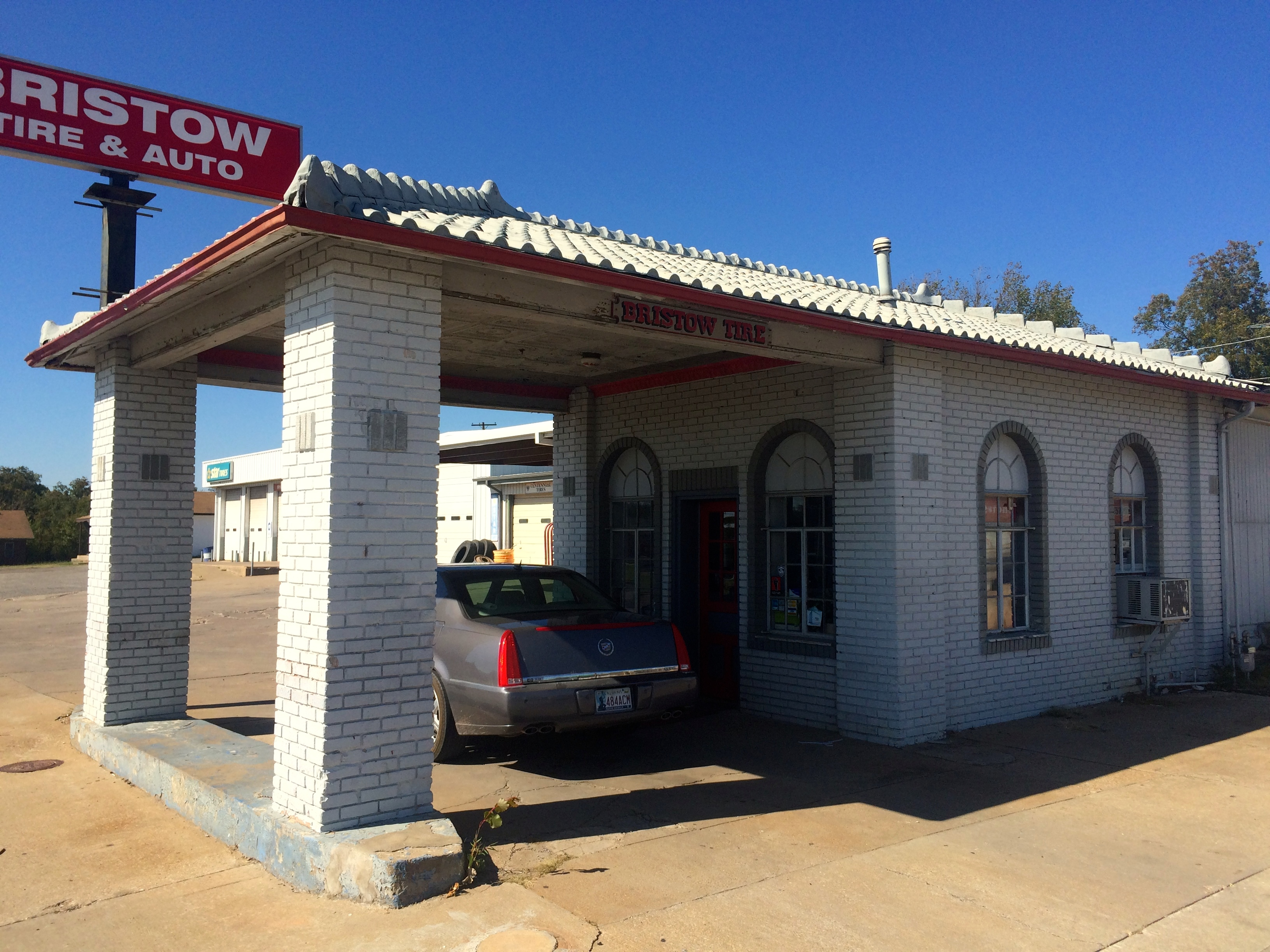

- Location within Oklahoma
- Location: 115 W. Fourth St., Bristow, Oklahoma
- Coordinates: 35°49′51″N 96°23′29″W
- Area: less than one acre
- Built: 1923
- Architectural style: Renaissance
- MPS: Route 66 in Oklahoma MPS
- NRHP reference No.: 95000033
- Added to NRHP: February 23, 1995

The Bristow Tire Shop, at 115 W. Fourth St. in Bristow, Oklahoma, was built in 1923. It was listed on the National Register of Historic Places in 1995.

It was a filling station with a gas pump.

== See also ==
- Bristow Firestone Service Station
