= Tom Slick =

American inventor and businessman (1916–1962)

Thomas Baker Slick Jr. (May 6, 1916 – October 6, 1962) was a San Antonio, Texas-based inventor, businessman, adventurer, and heir to an oil business. Slick's father, Thomas Baker Slick Sr., a.k.a. "The King of the Wildcatters", had made a fortune during the Oklahoma oil boom of the 1910s. He was notable for discovering Oklahoma's then-largest oil field, the Cushing Oil Field.

== Career ==
During the 1950s, Slick was an adventurer. He turned his attention to expeditions to investigate the Loch Ness Monster, the Yeti, Bigfoot and the Trinity Alps giant salamander. Slick's interest in cryptozoology was little known until the 1989 publication of the biography Tom Slick and the Search for Yeti, by Loren Coleman. Coleman continued his study of Slick in 2002 with Tom Slick: True Life Encounters in Cryptozoology. That book mentions many of Slick's adventures, in politics, art, science, and cryptozoology, including his involvement with the CIA and Howard Hughes. Slick financed Peter Byrne's pursuits of yeti and bigfoot.

Slick was a friend of many celebrities, including Hughes and fellow flier Jimmy Stewart. Stewart, for example, assisted a Slick-backed expedition in smuggling a piece of the Pangboche Yeti hand back to England for scientific analysis, Loren Coleman was to discover from Slick's files and confirmation from Stewart before his death.

Slick founded several research organizations, beginning with the forerunner of the Texas Biomedical Research Institute in 1941. His most well-known legacy is the non-profit Southwest Research Institute (SwRI), which he founded in 1947 to seek revolutionary advancements in technology. SwRI continues to advance pure and applied science in a variety of fields from lubricant and motor fuel formulation to solar physics and planetary science. He also founded the Mind Science Foundation in San Antonio in 1958 to do consciousness research.

Tom assisted his brother, Earl F. Slick, in founding Slick Airways, one of the first US scheduled freight airlines.

In 1953 Trinity University awarded him an honorary doctor of science.

In 1955 he was awarded a patent for the lift slab method of constructing concrete buildings.

He was an advocate of world peace. In 1958 he published the book, Permanent Peace: A Check and Balance Plan. He funded the Tom Slick World Peace lectures at the LBJ Library, and the Tom Slick Professorship of World Peace at the University of Texas.

Nicolas Cage was to have portrayed Slick in a movie, Tom Slick: Monster Hunter, but the project stalled.

== Art collection ==
Slick was an avid collector of modern art. His collection was surveyed by the McNay Art Museum with an exhibition and catalogue titled Tom Slick: International Art Collector.

== Death ==
On October 6, 1962, Slick was returning from a Canadian hunting trip when his airplane crashed in Montana. Reportedly, the aircraft disintegrated in flight. A wing broke off in violent wind shear over the mountains. He was buried in Mission Burial Park, San Antonio.

== See also ==
- Tom Slick: Mystery Hunter

== Sources ==
=== Biographies ===
- Coleman, Loren (1989). Tom Slick and the Search for the Yeti. Boston: Faber and Faber. ISBN 978-0-571-12900-3.
- Coleman, Loren (2002). Tom Slick: True Life Encounters in Cryptozoology. Fresno, California: Linden Press. ISBN 0-941936-74-0.
- Cooke, Catherine Nixon (2005). Tom Slick, Mystery Hunter. Paraview Inc. ISBN 0-9764986-2-6. (author is Slick's niece and former director of the Mind Science Foundation)
