= Jackson Barnett =

American landowner (1856–1934)

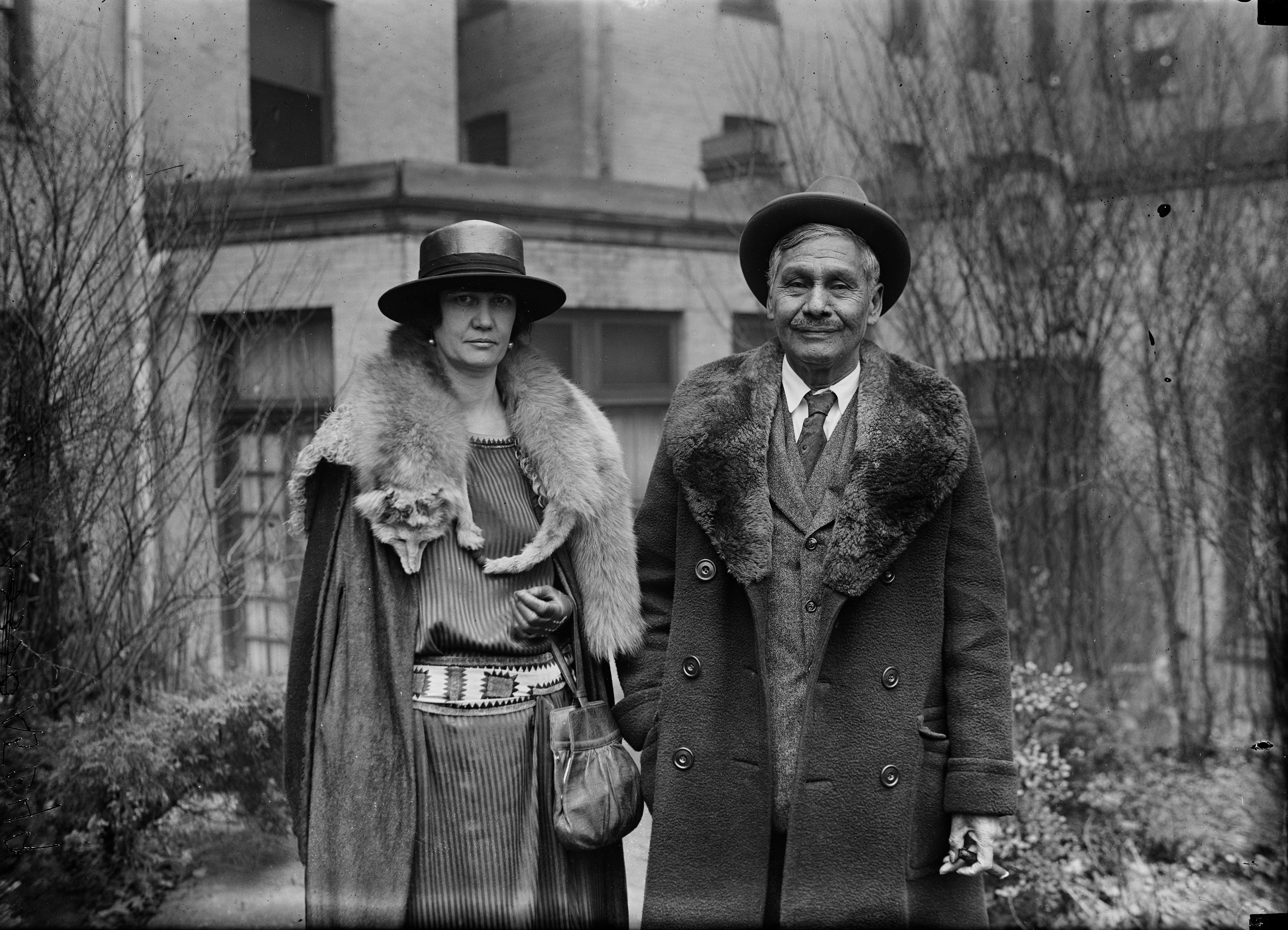
- Anna and Jackson Barnett at the White House in 1923
- Born: 1 January 1856
- Died: 29 May 1934 (aged 78)
- Known for: "The world's richest Indian"

Jackson Barnett (1 January 1856 – 29 May 1934) was an Oklahoma landowner of the Muscogee or Creek people, who became known as "the world's richest Indian" when oil wells on his land produced as much as $24 million worth of oil starting in 1912. Barnett's 12.5% royalty share was worth between $3 million and $4 million, but due to Barnett's illiteracy and a court finding that Barnett was legally incompetent from a head injury, his money was administered by the Creek County courts and the U.S. Department of the Interior until 1920.

Jackson was the son of a mixed Creek farmer, Siah Barnett, and a Creek woman named Thlesothle. Orphaned at an early age, he was raised by his mother's relatives. He suffered a head injury after falling from a horse as a young man. As a result of the Curtis Act of 1898, Barnett received title to 160 acres (65 ha) in Creek County in 1903, but the land was administered in trust by the Department of the Interior. During the same decade, Barnett was a supporter of the Crazy Snake Rebellion.

With the discovery of oil on Barnett's lands in 1912, a series of court actions by interested parties litigated the control of Barnett's trust. Barnett was declared incompetent and denied access to his affairs simply because he only spoke the Muscogee Creek language and not English. Barnett was permitted a modest income and was installed in a house near Henryetta. In 1919, the courts allowed the diversion of money from Barnett's trust to the construction of the "Jackson Barnett Hospital" in Henryetta. In 1920, Barnett, then in his seventies, married Anna Laura Lowe (1881–1952), a fortune hunter whom he had met only once before. The couple had to marry in Kansas after a marriage license was denied in Oklahoma. Barnett's guardians were unable to annul the marriage and the hospital plans were never pursued. Instead, the trust was divided between Anna Barnett and Bacone Indian College.

The Barnetts moved to Los Angeles and bought a mansion on Wilshire Boulevard, where Jackson passed his time directing traffic at a nearby intersection. Legal actions continued from 1923 to 1929, which provoked congressional hearings on the role of the Bureau of Indian Affairs (BIA) in establishing and administering the Barnett trust and others like it. The hearings led to criticism of BIA administrator Charles H. Burke's actions, and during the 1930s, to the Indian Reorganization Act of 1934. In 1927, Barnett v. Equitable again proclaimed Jackson Barnett incompetent in federal court. In March 1934, another federal ruling annulled the Barnetts' marriage and Anna Barnett's rights to Jackson's trust on the grounds that Jackson had been "kidnapped" by a woman of suspect moral character, but allowed Anna to act as Jackson's caretaker. Jackson Barnett died on 29 May 1934 of natural causes: allegations that Anna had poisoned him were found to be false.

Anna was finally evicted from the Wilshire Boulevard residence after four years, even though she had gained significant support from Los Angeles society, including Los Angeles District Attorney Burton Fitts and California Governor Frank Merriam. Anna was tear-gassed after she threw a hatchet during the eviction, and lived the remainder of her life with a daughter while unsuccessfully attempting to regain a share of the Barnett estate, which amounted to $3.5 million in 1934 ($55.4 million estimated value in 2012 dollars). In 1982, the Jackson Barnett No. 11 Oil Well, the most productive well on Barnett's lands, was listed on the National Register of Historic Places.
