= Tom Slick: Mystery Hunter =

Scripted podcast starring Owen Wilson

Tom Slick: Mystery Hunter was a scripted historical fiction podcast about Tom Slick starring Owen Wilson. The series was produced by iHeartRadio.

== Background ==
The show is a historical fiction audio drama. The show stars Owen Wilson, Sissy Spacek, and Schuyler Fisk. The show is a production of School of Humans and iHeartPodcasts. The show was written by Jeb Stuart. Episodes were released on a weekly basis. The series is family-friendly. The show is based on real events in the life of Tom Slick. The show is an eight part series. Tom Slick was from San Antonio and Owen Wilson is from Dallas.

== Reception ==
The show was nominated for best fiction podcast at the 2025 Ambies awards. Texas Public Radio compared the show to an old time radio drama called The Shadow.
