= Slick Airways =

US scheduled all-cargo carrier (1946–1966) sold to Airlift

Slick Corporation dba Slick Airways Slick Airways
IATA	ICAO	Call sign
SI^{(1)}	SI^{(1)}	—
- Founded: 4 January 1946 incorporated in Delaware
- Commenced operations: March 4, 1946 as Slick Airways from 31 August 1962 as The Slick Corporation dba Slick Airways
- Ceased operations: July 1, 1966
- Operating bases: Burbank, California; San Francisco, California
- Headquarters: San Francisco, California; Burbank, California; Dallas, Texas; Burbank, California; San Antonio, Texas; United States
- Founder: Earl F. Slick

Notes
- (1) IATA, ICAO codes were the same until the 1980s

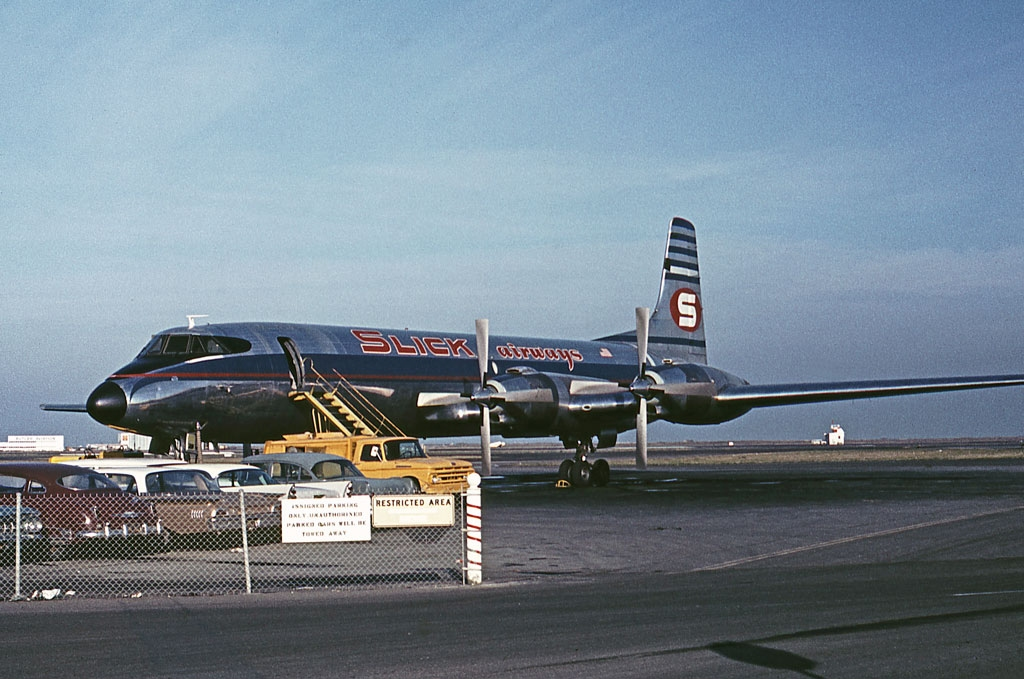
CL-44 at San Francisco 1963

Slick Airways was a pioneering United States freight airline founded after World War II by Earl F. Slick, a 26-year-old oil heir and former military pilot. Its substantial capitalization and size set it apart from many hundreds of similar airlines founded in the same era. In the immediate post World War II era, Slick carried more domestic air freight than any other airline, even its contemporary, the famous Flying Tiger Line (FTL). Slick Airways was initially an irregular air carrier (without formal government certification) before becoming one of the first scheduled US cargo airlines, certificated as a domestic "all-cargo carrier" in 1949 by the Civil Aeronautics Board (CAB), the now-defunct Federal agency that, at the time, tightly controlled most US commercial air transport. FTL received its certificate in the same proceeding.

However, domestic scheduled air cargo was unprofitable for pure cargo airlines during this period. Such carriers survived by making up the deficit in other businesses, but Slick was relatively undiversified and ultimately unable to endure. In 1953–1954, Slick suffered a disruptive failed merger with FTL. Slick obtained CAB permission to suspend scheduled service in 1958 after which it mostly flew for the military. After resuming scheduled service in 1962, Slick ceased again in 1965. In 1966 Slick merged its remaining military charter business with fellow scheduled cargo operator Airlift International. In 1968 Slick's dormant domestic scheduled authority also transferred to Airlift. The Slick Corporation survived for a time as a company active outside the airline industry.

== History ==
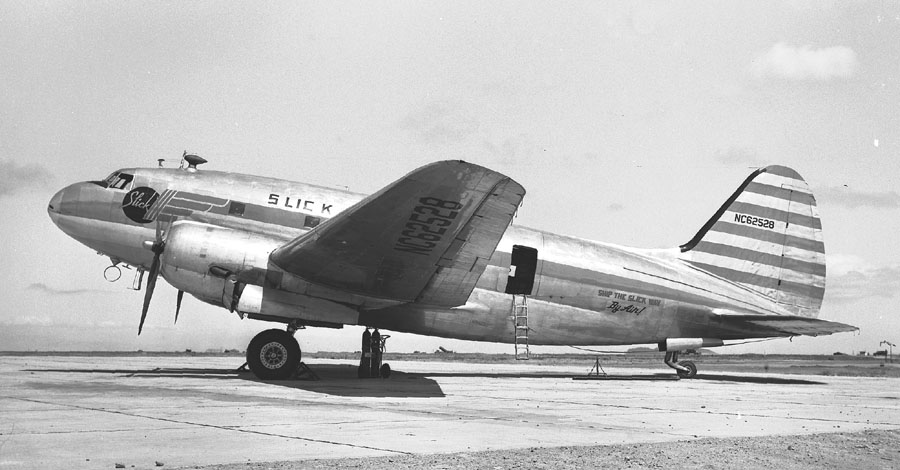
C-46. Registration is an "NC" number, making this 1948 or before. "Ship the Slick Way—By Air!" is visible aft of the door

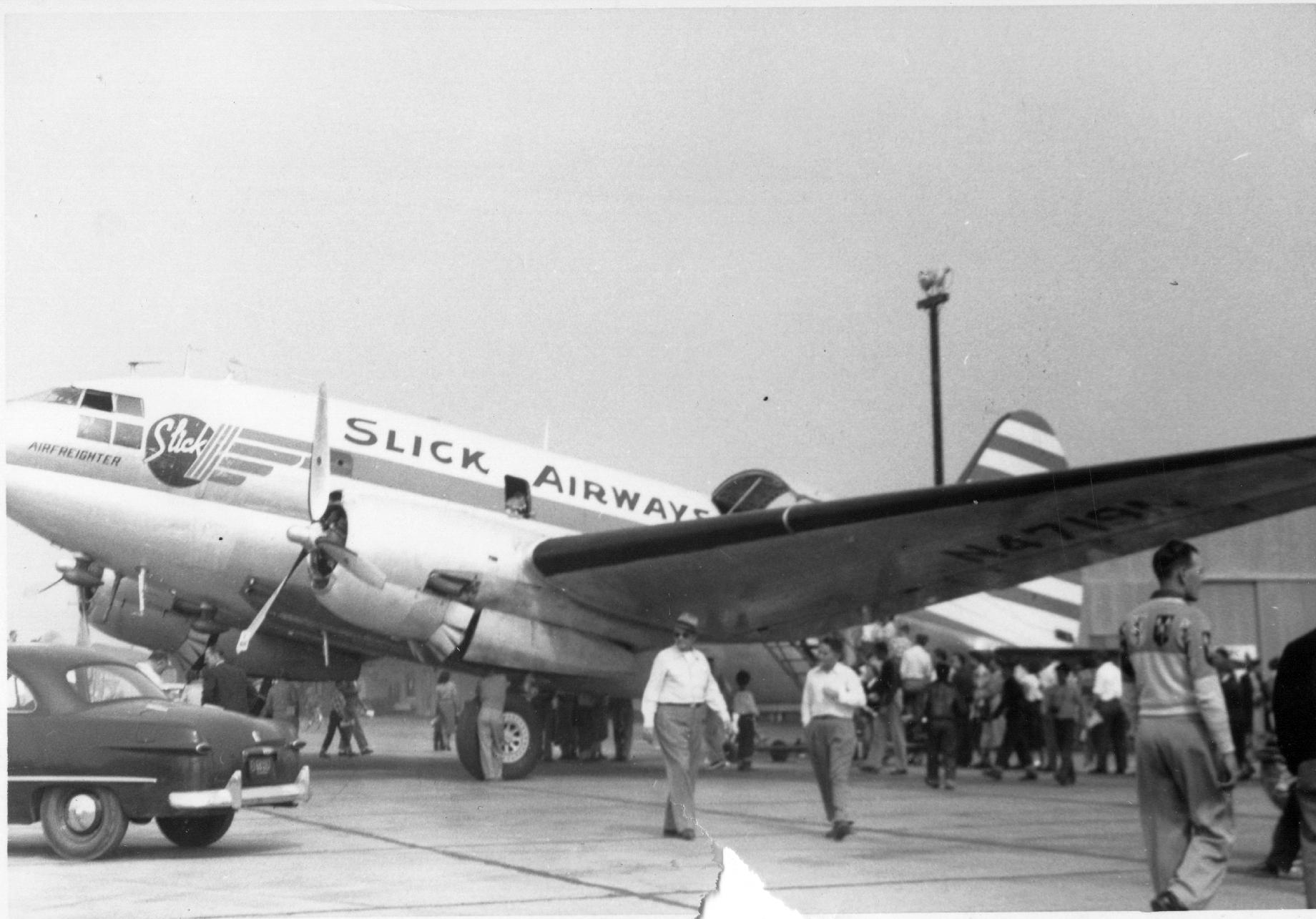
C-46 at Los Angeles 1949

=== Startup through certification ===
Slick Airways incorporated in Delaware on 4 January 1946 and started operations 4 March. 26-year-old Earl Slick was an Air Transport Command pilot in World War II, the son of Thomas Baker Slick Sr., who made a fortune in oil, and the brother of Tom Slick, a philanthropist and adventurer, who also invested in the airline. After World War II, hundreds of small airlines emerged as former military aviators sought to make a living using surplus military aircraft. Slick Airways stood out for its size, initially capitalized at $1.12 million (over $18 million in 2025 terms), which it noted in a national advertising campaign. The aircraft were cheap; of an initial fleet of 10 Curtiss C-46s, nine were purchased from the government for a total of $247,000; each originally cost the US military about $200,000. Further, in 1946, Slick's C-46s were 10 of only 15 wartime production certificated for civilian use; there were over 600 more surplus C-46s but none could be used for civilian air transport until conversion programs were designed. Slick's C-46s had been destined for the Republic of China Air Force (ROCAF) and Slick adopted ROCAF's six blue tail stripes. The slogan "Ship the Slick Way—By Air!" was written aft of the cargo door. By 1951 Slick would write off six of its original ten C-46s in crashes, four fatal. (see Accidents).

Earl Slick was inspired by his experiences during World War II. Air freight was a tiny business prior to the war, when the US military proved its worth. The airline experimented with techniques to expand the utility of air freight. It cooled its aircraft in warm weather and kept the fuselage warm at altitude to protect delicate cargos. From 1946 thru 1952 (with the exception of 1949, when it was second to American Airlines), Slick transported more domestic airfreight than any other US carrier. In the mid 1950s, Slick experimented with light-weight containers for household goods, the idea being that customers would avoid expenses while waiting for belongings to arrive by truck.

The early air freight business was unprofitable: Slick lost $861K in 1946 and another $444K in 1947. FTL had losses of similar scale. In late 1947, the trunk carriers (e.g. American Airlines, United) started a freight price war that, in the view of Aviation Week, put the freight carriers' "backs against the wall". The trunks could cover freight losses with passenger revenue and were well paid to fly the US mail. Slick offered to fly mail for less than half what the trunks received, which the CAB dismissed as "an unanalyzed gesture ... intended to confuse the proceeding," and insisted no government money subsidized trunk competition with freight airlines. A 1951 CAB publication conceded mail pay did include subsidies. California Eastern Airways, another leading freight airline, was bankrupt by May 1948. Air freight was viewed as having great potential. The CAB, in assessing the possible economic impact of air freight, noted 1 billion potential ton miles of air freight (versus 118 million in 1948) translated to $150–200 million in revenue versus 1948 total airline passenger revenues of $346 million. Slick was by far the largest domestic air freight carrier, over twice the size of FTL in 1948 by ton-miles. In July 1949, Slick was one of four airlines certificated as a scheduled "all-cargo carrier" by the CAB, getting a southern transcontinental route (FTL got a northern route, U. S. Airlines got a north/south route and Airnews got a local Texas network). None were permitted to carry the US mail.

Table 1: Slick Airways financial results, 1950–1958(1) Of total US scheduled air freight, international and domestic
USD 000	1950	1951	1952	1953	1954	1955	1956	1957	1958
Op revenue:									
Scheduled	5,329	6,590	6,764	6,293	5,629	6,841	8,014	7,914	305
Non-sched	1,245	2,668	503	1,280	299	2,565	9,313	10,591	5,848
Other	183	543	1,096	1,544	30			608	368
Total	6,757	9,802	8,363	9,117	5,958	9,446	17,718	19,115	6,523
Operating result	541	456	147	(234)	(1,287)	(909)	379	(2,853)	(496)
Net result	507	353	434	1,239	(1,030)	(553)	327	(2,246)	(769)
Op margin (%)	8.0	4.7	1.8	-2.6	-21.6	-9.6	2.1	-14.9	-7.6
Mkt share (%)^{(1)}	10.0	11.1	9.8	8.5	7.1	7.3	7.4	6.1	

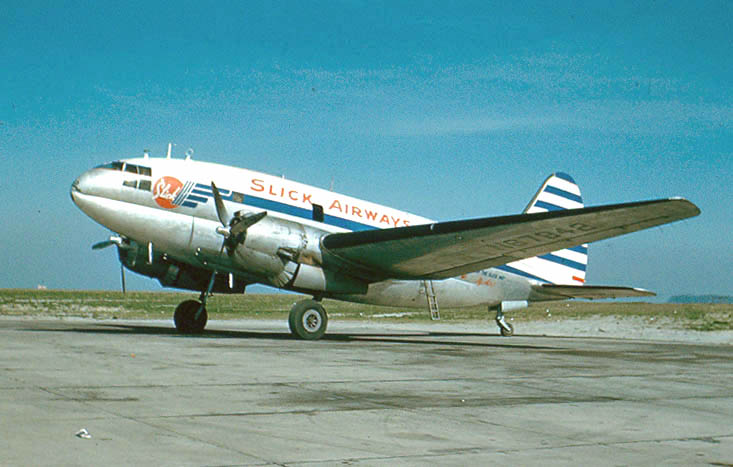
C-46 at San Francisco N67942. See External links for a video of an unusual color film of Slick C-46 and DC-4 aircraft

=== Quicktrans ===
In July 1950 the US Navy, facing the Korean War, had 48 tons of ammunition on the east coast that it needed on the west. The Navy contracted Slick to fly the materiel in what was called "Operation Quicktrans." This worked well, so the Navy extended the arrangement and Slick flew daily transcontinental flights linking Navy bases on two coasts. Transit times dropped to a day or two from what had previously been a week or more and resulting costs were better than Railway Express or trucks due to high aircraft utilization and full aircraft. This was the genesis of a US Navy domestic air freight system called Quicktrans that would be the backbone of the Navy's domestic transport network through 1994.

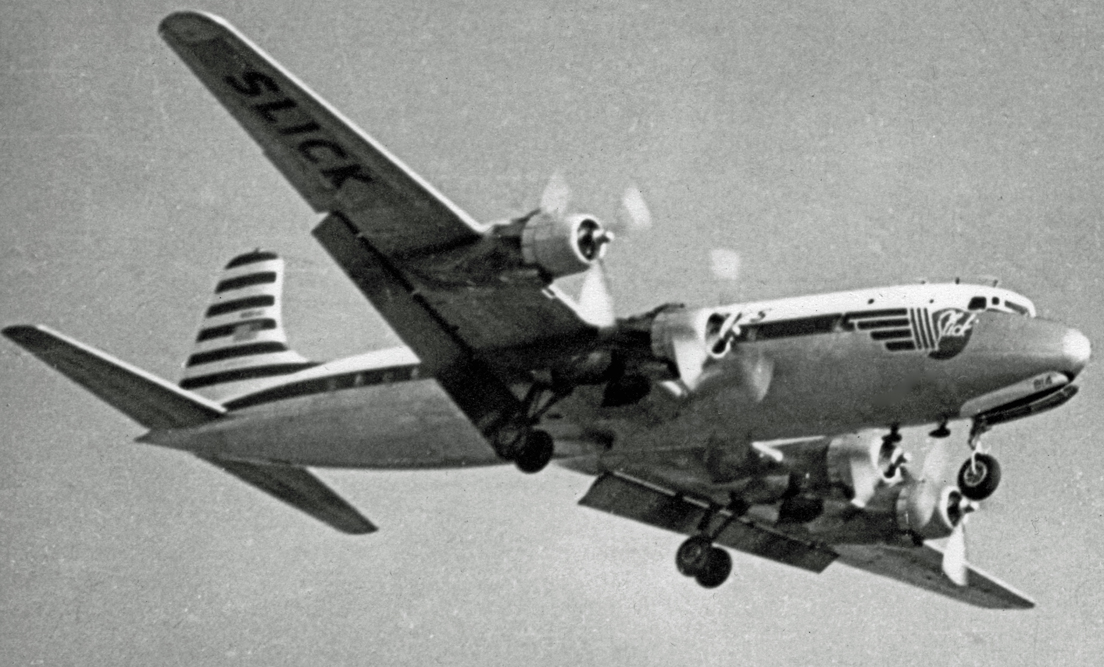
DC-6A at RAF Burtonwood, UK 1956

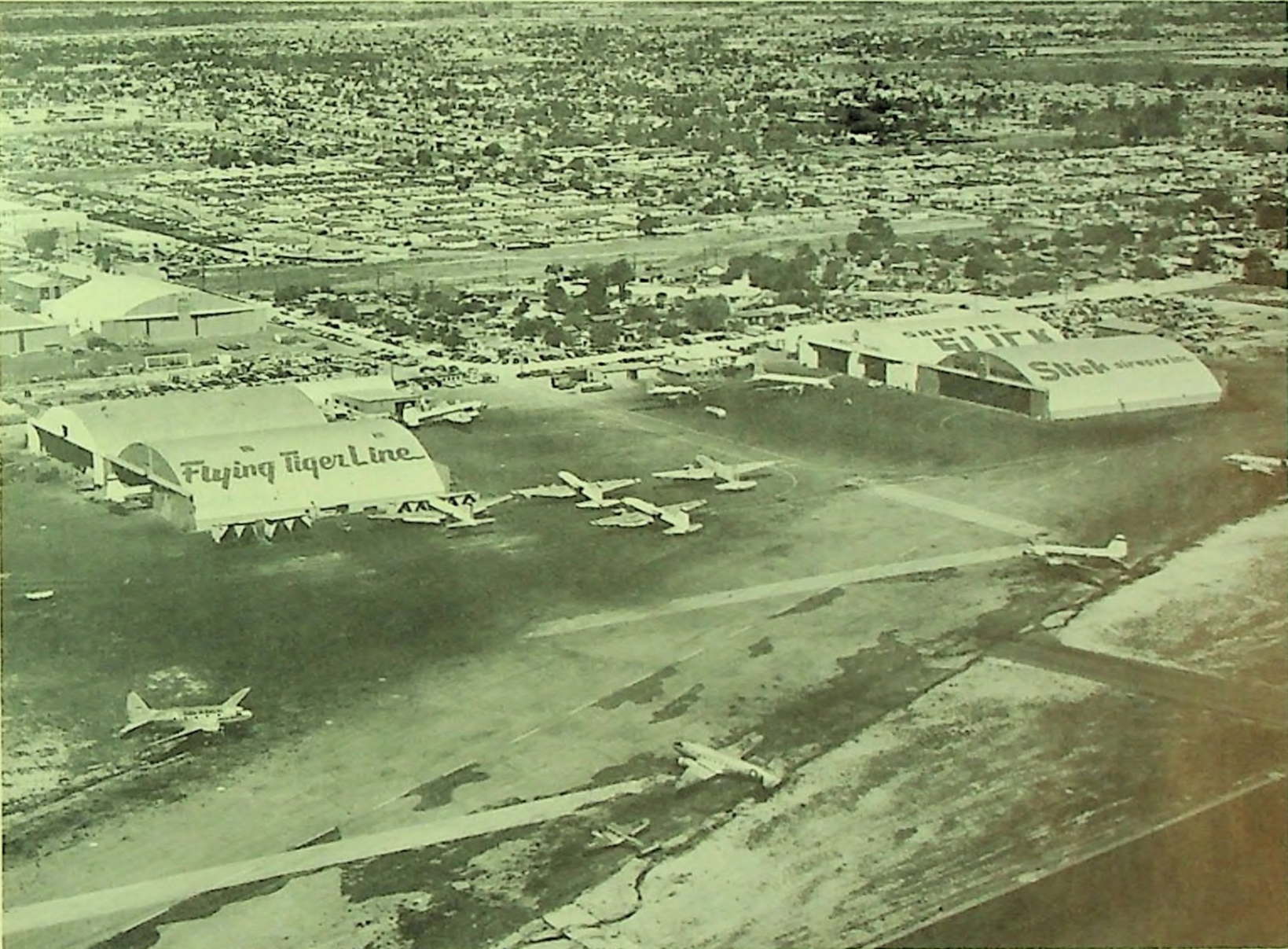
FTL and Slick facilities at Lockheed Air Terminal 1953

=== DC-6A and Flying Tiger attempted merger ===
In October 1950, Slick was the civil launch customer for the DC-6A, a more capable cargo version of the DC-6. The airline also moved its headquarters to Lockheed Air Terminal in Burbank, California from San Antonio, Texas, in 1951. Slick's headquarters moved several more times, to Dallas in 1956, back to Burbank by 1958, lastly to San Francisco in 1962.

In March 1953, FTL agreed to buy out Slick. FTL had become more successful than Slick, in part because more of its revenue was outside of scheduled air freight, with a large military contract flying over the Pacific and maintenance and aircraft trading/leasing businesses. In 1952, 26% of FTL's revenue was schedued air freight versus 47% for Slick. In the same year, FTL had beaten Slick for the Navy's Quicktrans contract at rates Slick viewed as unprofitable. Slick made a profit in 1952 only by selling aircraft. The CAB approved the merger in January 1954. FTL and Slick started to integrate but by September the deal collapsed due to CAB-mandated labor protective provisions that paid employees disadvantaged by the merger. Estimated payments ranged up to over $6 million, costs avoidable by not completing the merger. For a few weeks, FTL said it would leave the freight business entirely, in favor of aircraft leasing, but its employees rallied and provided it with pay cuts. Slick had to reconstitute its own headquarters, find new facilities at airports from which it had already withdrawn, and faced a rejuvenated and more efficient FTL. Further, it had shrunk its fleet (see Fleet) in anticipation of the merger. In the wake of the failed merger, Earl Slick stepped down as chair of the board and his executive role.

=== 1958 scheduled service suspension and military contracting ===
On 24 February 1958, Slick ceased scheduled service: the airline lost over $3 million in scheduled service in the year-ending June 1957. Slick tried to make that up with military charters. But, at that time, the Air Force provided most routine transportation with its own transportation service, Military Air Transport Service (MATS). The little left over for airlines was allocated by bid, and those bids were becoming increasingly keen. Military charters no longer covered Slick's scheduled system losses. Slick also blamed the CAB for not sufficiently supporting the scheduled freight business. The CAB approved Slick's suspension in June, in a decision which disagreed it was culpable for Slick's troubles. Slick became almost a pure military contractor. In US government fiscal years (then ending June) 1959, 1960, 1961, Slick received 94%, 95% and 96% respectively of its revenue from the US military (which Table 2 shows was profitable). By contrast, the same numbers for FTL for the same years were 46%, 31% and 48%. In December 1961, Slick was flying Lockheed L-1049 Super Constellations to Asia for the Air Force from Travis Air Force Base and DC-6As and DC-4s for Quicktrans again.

In 1960, the Air Force changed how it bought military charters. It de-emphasized MATS's own aircraft for routine transport, instead relying on commercial carriers like Slick. Further, it would no longer rely on competitive bidding, instead, it established uniform (and higher) charter rates. With price no longer a factor, charter contracts were allocated to airlines that enrolled what the government viewed as desirable aircraft in the Civil Reserve Air Fleet. Military charters became a more reliable and lucrative source of revenue for Slick.

Table 2: Slick Airways^{(1)} financial results, 1959–1966(1) after 31 August 1962, the airline division of Slick Corporation
USD 000	1959	1960	1961	1962	1963	1964	1965	1966
Op revenue:								
Scheduled				646	3,749	4,711	2,662	
Non-sched	9,221	11,799	11,775	21,050	15,810	18,827	18,426	9,916
Other	445	201	216	72	93	119	326	218
Total	9,667	12,000	11,991	21,769	19,652	23,655	21,415	10,134
Operating result	1,008	1,114	1,259	2,124	39	73	713	2,671
Net result	159	1,252	1,183	1,262	(635)	(487)	203	1,198
Op margin (%)	10.4	9.3	10.5	9.8	0.2	0.3	3.3	26.4

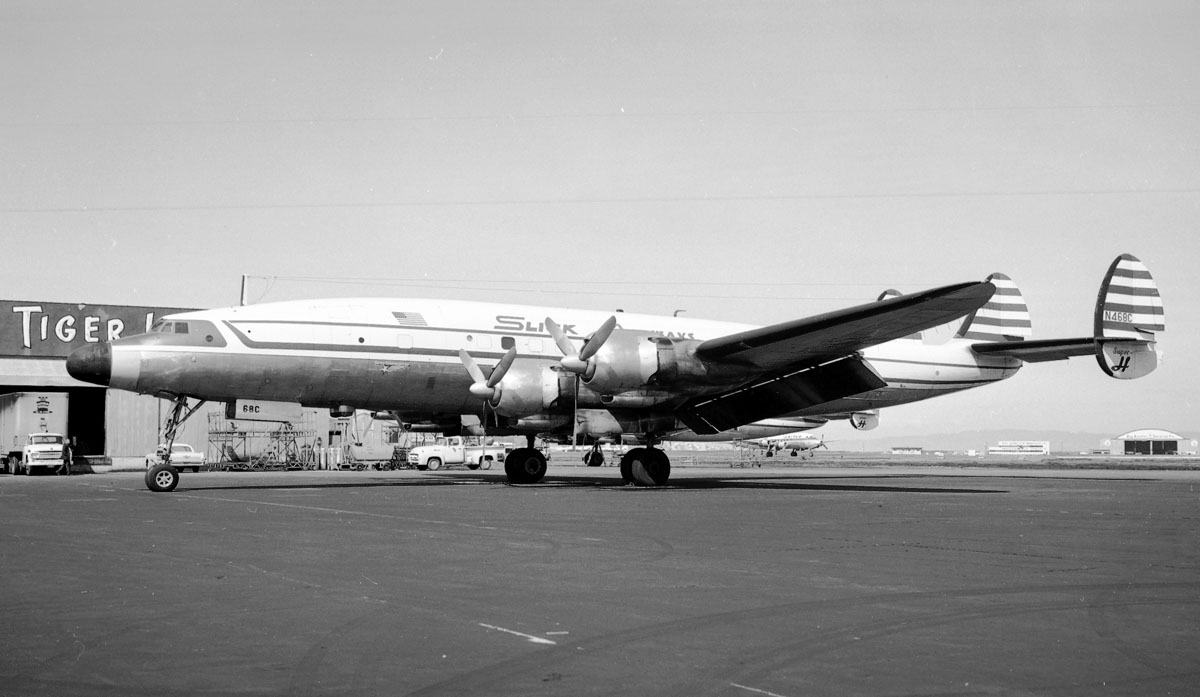
L-1049H Super Constellation

=== Unprofitable sector ===
Domestic scheduled cargo was unprofitable for pure freight operators at the time. It was well known; academics wrote papers about it. Every such operator struggled. As previously noted, in 1949, the CAB certificated Slick, FTL, U. S. Airlines and Airnews for domestic scheduled cargo. In 1955 the CAB additionally certificated Riddle (later known as Airlift International) and AAXICO for domestic scheduled cargo. Airnews, U. S. Airlines and AAXICO flew only small amounts of scheduled cargo before exiting. Airnews returned its certificate in 1951. U. S. Airlines went bankrupt in 1951 and was out of business entirely by 1954. AAXICO withdrew scheduled domestic cargo business in 1959 after two-and-half years.

In 1962, Riddle suspended all scheduled domestic cargo routes except New York to Miami. In 1968, the CAB noted Airlift/Riddle's domestic scheduled cargo had never been profitable. The one profitable carrier with domestic scheduled cargo operations was FTL which succeeded by making scheduled domestic airfreight a small part of its activities. From 1949 through 1958, domestic scheduled airfreight averaged only 29% of FTL's total operations, compared to almost 55% for Slick from 1949 through when it suspended scheduled service in 1958, which understates FTL's diversification from activities such as aircraft leasing. Only in 1958, after Slick withdrew, did FTL make its first profit on domestic scheduled cargo.

The advent of jets (late 1958/early 1959 in the US domestic market) compounded the problem. The largest domestic scheduled passenger carriers carried cargo and in some cases operated cargo aircraft. By 1962, passenger carriers flew 84% of domestic scheduled cargo, including over 3/4 that flown on dedicated cargo aircraft. On acquiring passenger jets, passenger carriers converted some propliners to cargo, which operated at a loss, but less of a loss than grounding them. The large underfloor ("belly") spaces of passenger jets created a significant supply of new cargo capacity. Passenger airlines also adopted jet freighters before cargo airlines, which were far more efficient not only due to speed and economies of scale but also because they were designed for mechanized loading, with faster turnaround times than for propeller cargo aircraft. Jet freighter cost per ton-mile was less than half that of propliner freighters.

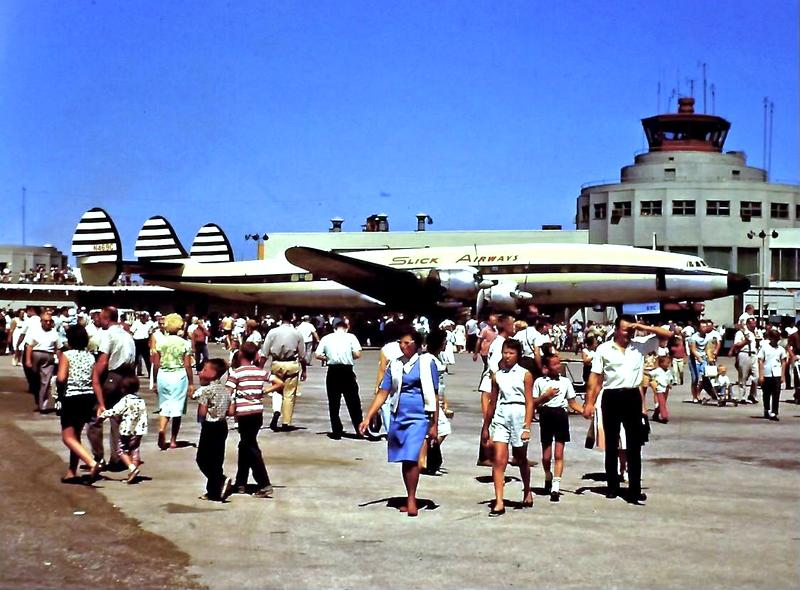
Chicago Midway L-1049H July 1964

=== Second attempt at scheduled service ===
Slick resumed scheduled service 1 October 1962. In June the CAB made Slick's certificate permanent, which obligated Slick to start service within 90 days. Two of five board members strongly dissented, backing the CAB examiner's preliminary decision to strip Slick of its certificate on the basis of its failure to fly scheduled domestic cargo to date. The majority decision was based on continued expansion of the freight market and Slick's new Canadair CL-44D turboprop equipment, seen as providing the necessary economics. This coincided with a name change for Slick: as of August 31, the legal entity became The Slick Corporation, with the airline now an operating division. This reflected Slick's purchase of two non-aviation businesses, a window-shade manufacturer and a maker of pulverizing machines. Slick Airways was now a dba.

Slick partially integrated its Quicktrans and scheduled systems, obtaining CAB and Navy permission to split capacity half-and-half civilian/Quicktrans on transcontinental L-1049H flights. Slick had the Quicktrans contract from July 1961 through June 1965. As Table 2 shows, with return of scheduled service, Slick's financial results were breakeven on an operating basis, not great but better than the first period of scheduled service. The company kept moving forward: in 1964, Slick ordered the (unbuilt) civilian version of the Lockheed C-141 Starlifter and in early 1965 ordered Douglas DC-8s (not delivered, see Fleet). But Slick lost the Quicktrans contract to a combination of Zantop Air Transport and FTL as of 1 July 1965 and later that month, asked the CAB to again cease scheduled service. Slick lost $8.4 million on scheduled service from its resumption in 1962 through June 1965, and was currently losing $10,000 per day on the service. Slick's scheduled revenue during that period was less than $11.3 million. The CAB allowed Slick a 90 day suspension starting 27 August, later extended to a year, and Slick became again solely a charter carrier. Slick's late 1965 fleet was substantially reduced over year-end 1964, reflecting the shedding of Quicktrans and scheduled networks (see Fleet).

=== Merger with Airlift ===
The US military required charter contractors to have a meaningful civilian business, and Slick's remaining fleet was entirely engaged flying to Asia for the military. Slick would not be able to contract for other than ad-hoc military charters after June 1966 when its existing contract ran out (military contracts being on US government fiscal year basis, which at that time was a June year-end). In March 1966, Airlift agreed to buy the airline division of Slick Corp, an asset purchase wherein Airlift acquired facilities and aircraft and hired the employees under existing labor agreements to preserve Slick's ability to operate military charters past June 1966. The CAB approved the transaction and the former Slick Airways operated for a time as a separately certificated division of Airlift (with the Airlift brand), bringing with it four Canadair CL-44Ds and two Lockheed Super Constellations. Airlift later successfully applied for Slick's domestic scheduled authority, the CAB awarding this in 1968.

The Slick Corporation continued with non-aviation business. In 1972 it merged with a company called United States Filter. Although U.S. Filter was the surviving brand, the surviving corporate entity was Slick (after a name change to United States Filter Holdings). Earl Slick remained a board member. U.S. Filter merged into Ashland Oil in 1981.

== Fleet ==
1 November 1947:

- 11 Curtiss C-46
- 1 Douglas DC-4

January 1952:

- 21 Curtiss C-46
- 3 Douglas DC-6A

November 1954 (immediately after failed merger with Flying Tiger):

- 10 Curtiss C-46
- 2 Douglas DC-6A

March 1957:

- 13 Curtiss C-46
- 7 Douglas DC-4
- 7 Douglas DC-6A

December 1961:

- 4 Douglas DC-4
- 6 Douglas DC-6A
- 5 Lockheed L-1049H Super Constellation

December 1964:

- 8 Douglas DC-4
- 4 Douglas DC-6A
- 8 Lockheed L-1049H Super Constellation
- 4 Canadair CL-44D

September 1965:

- 4 Canadair CL-44D
- 2 Lockheed L-1049H Super Constellation

In January 1965, Slick ordered two Douglas DC-8-55Fs but cancelled the order when it ceased scheduled service later that year. FTL bought both aircraft (s/n 45816 and 45817). Slick also ordered six of the (unbuilt) civilian version of the Lockheed C-141 Starlifter, the L-300B/L-301.

== Accidents ==
Slick Airways suffered nine accidents resulting in an aircraft being damaged beyond repair. In total, 19 people lost their lives.

- 14 February 1947: C-46E NC59486 en route from Omaha, Nebraska undershot the runway during a practice ILS approach into Denver; the two pilots died.
- 21 August 1947: two pilots and a non-revenue passenger (all on board) died when C-46E NC59488 en route from Denver to Burbank flew into mountain ridge at an altitude of approximately 10,000 ft (3,000 m) near Hanksville, Utah while in cloudy conditions. The probable cause was failure to maintain required altitude for that terrain: controlled flight into terrain.
- 17 September 1947: C-46E NC59495 was extensively damaged during an emergency landing at Burbank on a flight from Denver due to fuel starvation. The two pilots survived but the aircraft was a write-off. Probable cause was failure of the captain to track of fuel consumption, and provide for sufficient fuel reserve.
- 16 May 1948: The two pilots of a C-46E NC59489 died when the aircraft crashed near Columbus, Ohio. They were flying from Newark to Chicago and diverted to Columbus to avoid severe weather and encountered extreme turbulence, causing rivets and skin to fail near the vertical fin, rendering the aircraft uncontrollable.
- 9 October 1949: C-46E NC59485 was en route from Las Vegas to Denver when it diverted to Cheyenne, Wyoming to avoid bad weather. However, on approach, the aircraft, accumulating ice, encountered heavy squalls, leading to loss of control and the death of the two pilots and one company employee on board.
- 23 February 1951: C-46E N59490 encountered severe icing during a flight from Burbank to San Francisco. The pilots carried out a forced landing on a highway near Newhall, California. There were no fatalities but the aircraft was destroyed.
- 4 March 1953: Flight 162-3, C-46F N4717N, crashed into trees near Windsor Locks, Connecticut on a flight from New York to Bradley Field; the two pilots died. After missing an instrument approach, the captain, without informing the airport, attempted a quick VFR landing despite the late hour and poor conditions, rather than reset for another instrument approach, but misjudged the terrain.
- 3 February 1963: a Lockheed L-1049H Super Constellation N9740Z on a ferry flight with a limited complement of avionics due to maintenance issues, hits runway approach lights during an instrument approach to San Francisco and subsequently crashes, causing the deaths of two (out of three) flight crew and two (out of five) non-revenue passengers. The crew continued an instrument approach "after adequate visual reference was lost below authorized minimums." Inadequate safety briefings likely contributed in injuries/deaths.
- 10 March 1964: Slick Airways Flight 12, a C-54B-DC N384 crashed during approach at Boston; the two pilots and loadmaster on board died. Aircraft icing, particularly of the tail, caused an uncommanded and unrecoverable pitch-down, sending the aircraft into a lumber yard.

== See also ==
- List of defunct airlines of the United States
- Airlift International
- Flying Tiger Line
- Quicktrans
- Thomas Baker Slick Sr.
