= Wheeler No. 1 Oil Well =

- U.S. National Register of Historic Places
- Location within Oklahoma Location within the United States
- Nearest city: Drumright, Oklahoma
- Coordinates: 36°00′01.67″N 96°35′59.57″W
- Area: Less than 1 acre (0.40 ha)
- Built: 1912
- NRHP reference No.: 83002083
- Added to NRHP: March 14, 1983

The Wheeler No. 1 Oil Well was the first well drilled in the Drumright-Cushing Oil Field of northeast Oklahoma, near Drumright. The success of the well, drilled in 1912 by Thomas Baker Slick, Sr., led to the development of the Cushing field and gave impetus to the early development of Oklahoma oilfields. The Drumright-Cushing field would go on to produce 310,000 barrels of oil a day at its peak in May 1917. The well made Slick's name as "King of the Wildcatters".

The well was financed by Charles B. Shaffer of Chicago, who hired Slick to drill wells at the Frank Wheeler farm using cable tool drilling techniques, which could not prevent gushers or blowouts. Three unsuccessful wells preceded the strike, which initially produced 400 barrels of high-grade oil a day from a depth of between 2,319 feet (707 m) and 2,347 feet (715 m). Because no mechanism existed to control the flow, the oil was diverted into pits for collection and storage. The source of the oil was a sand zone in the Drumright Dome, a syncline. Slick attempted to keep the strike secret, hiring armed guards, but eventually revealed the well's success in April 1912. A dugout built for the guards remains on the site, together with a commemorative plaque.

In time, the well's pressure subsided, requiring that the oil be pumped out of the well. The first pump was a two-cylinder gasoline-powered pump, later replaced by an electric drive. With the reduction in pressure the well was modified for secondary recovery, using an early form of hydraulic fracturing called "sand fracturing." As of 1980 it produced about a barrel a day, pumping four hours a day. Oil came from three layers: the Layton layer at 170 feet (52 m), the Wheeler layer at 2,300 feet (700 m), and the Bartlesville layer at 2,700 feet (820 m). A 2-inch (5.1 cm) pipeline connects the well to an oil-water separating unit about 2,500 feet (760 m) away, then to storage tanks. The well is located in a small clearing about 1,000 feet (300 m) west of Drumright. The well was still producing in 2012.

The Wheeler No. 1 well was placed on the National Register of Historic Places on March 14, 1983.
