= Jackson Barnett No. 11 Oil Well =

- U.S. National Register of Historic Places
- Location within Oklahoma Location within the United States
- Nearest city: Drumright, Oklahoma
- Coordinates: 35°58′26″N 96°35′4″W
- Area: less than one acre
- Built: 1916
- NRHP reference No.: 82003681
- Added to NRHP: July 27, 1982

The Jackson Barnett No. 11 Oil Well was the most productive oil well in the Cushing Oil Field of northeastern Oklahoma, USA, to the south of Drumright. The well was drilled in 1916 in the Shamrock Dome section of the Cushing field by the Gypsy Oil Company, striking oil on February 17. The well was on the land of Jackson Barnett, a Creek landowner who subsequently became known as the "world's richest Indian".

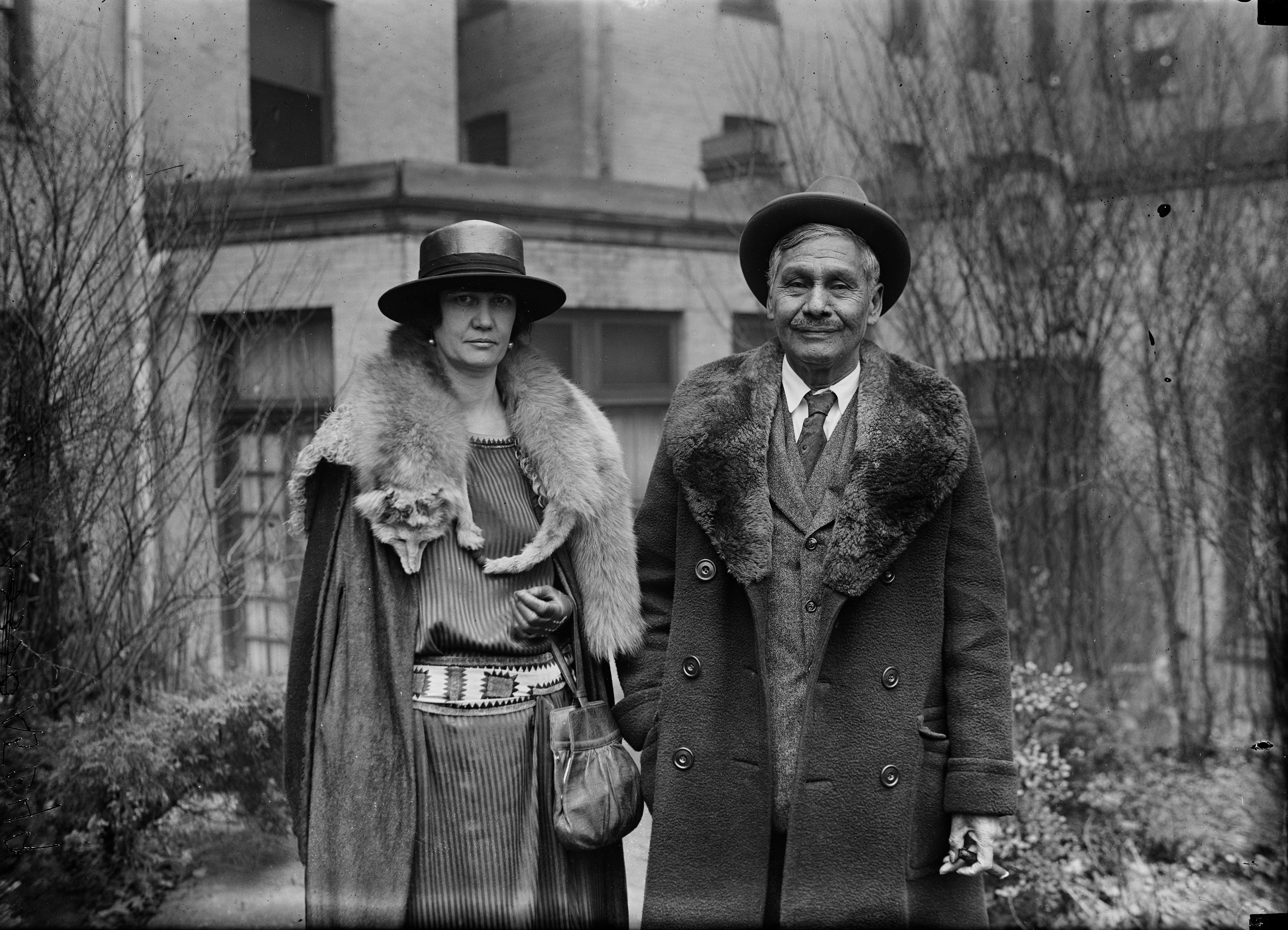
Anna and Jackson Barnett in 1923

Barnett owned 160 acres (65 ha) in trust Creek County, which began producing oil in 1912. Jackson's 12.5 percent royalty on the oil from his land earned him between $3 million and $4 million during his lifetime, but he only received a few hundred dollars per year at first. Until 1920, his fortune was managed as a trust by Creek County courts and the Department of the Interior, on the pretext that Jackson was illiterate and legally incompetent due to a head injury. Barnett's money became the subject of extensive litigation and eventual Congressional hearings. In 1920, he was pursued by Anna Laura Lowe, whom he married after one meeting. When a court gave part of the trust's money to Anna to administer, the couple moved to Los Angeles and bought a mansion.

The well was drilled into the Tucker sand layer at a depth between 2,800 feet (850 m) and 3,000 feet (910 m). Production on the well's first day was 4,000 barrels, rising to 10,000 barrels a day and peaking at 18,000 barrels per day. Average production was 10,000 barrels a day for most of its life. It was the first well in the Cushing field to produce 1 million barrels of oil and established the Oklahoma record for production from a single well. The well was capped in the mid-1960s. The site includes concrete foundations, the capped well casing, and a sign. In 1980, eight neighboring wells continued to produce oil.

The Jackson Barnett well was placed on the National Register of Historic Places on July 27, 1982.
