= First United Methodist Church of Drumright =

Historic church in Oklahoma, United States

- U.S. National Register of Historic Places
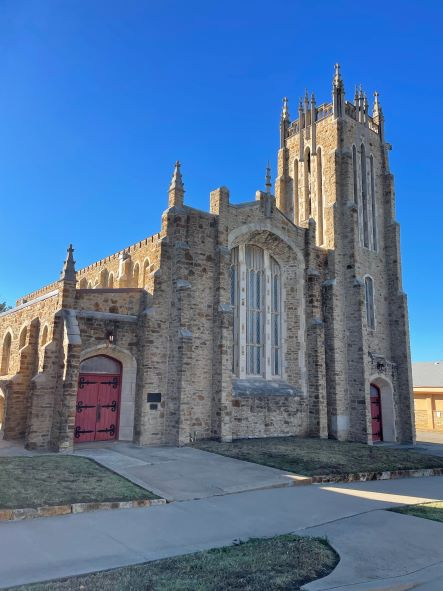

- Location within Oklahoma Location within the United States
- Location: 115 N. Pennsylvania Ave., Drumright, Oklahoma
- Coordinates: 35°59′21″N 96°36′7″W
- Area: less than one acre
- Built: 1927
- Architect: F.A. Duggan
- Architectural style: Late Gothic Revival
- NRHP reference No.: 82003679
- Added to NRHP: March 31, 1982

The First United Methodist Church of Drumright is a historic Methodist church in Drumright, Oklahoma. It was built in 1927 and added to the National Register of Historic Places in 1982.

Its NRHP nomination mentions it:

is the only English Gothic style building in the Gushing oil field area. The stained glass windows are unique because of the leaded diamond pane construction and the designs of the stained glass windows along the north and south sides of the sanctuary. There are five distinct pairs of window patterns, each matching on the north and south walls. The window patterns have no narrative content which is unusual for a religious structure of this scale. These ornate features were an attempt at sophistication for a small oil boom town in Oklahoma.
