= Bristow Presbyterian Church =

Historic church in Oklahoma, United States

- U.S. National Register of Historic Places
- Bristow Presbyterian Church in November of 2026

- Location within Oklahoma Location within the United States
- Location: 6th and Elm Sts., Bristow, Oklahoma
- Coordinates: 35°49′57″N 96°23′35″W
- Area: less than one acre
- Built: 1922
- Built by: Thomas Murray, other
- Architect: Corland L. Butler
- Architectural style: Late Gothic Revival
- NRHP reference No.: 79001992
- Added to NRHP: October 3, 1979

Bristow Presbyterian Church is a congregation of the Presbyterian Church (USA). The church was organized on October 21, 1917. The church building was erected in 1922 and added to the National Historic Register in 1979. The exterior walls are white marble from Carthage, Missouri, and interior walls are Bedford stone. Featuring Tiffany stained glass windows and a beautiful organ, the Sanctuary has been described as a pocket cathedral. It is located at the corner of West 6th and Elm in Bristow, Oklahoma.

The church was built on land donated by the Claude Freeland family, and had a membership of 98 in 2009.

It is a notable Gothic Revival building. Much of the building was built by its pastor, Thomas Murray.

The current minister is Rev. Rebecca Montgomery, who was raised in Chicago and educated at Princeton Theological Seminary. Before coming to Bristow, she spent a year in Greece as a missionary and three years in China, where she taught English and American culture at a university in Jiujiang. She returned to the United States in 2005, went back to Princeton, where she earned a Master of Divinity degree in 2008.
