= Texaco Service Station (Bristow, Oklahoma) =

- U.S. National Register of Historic Places
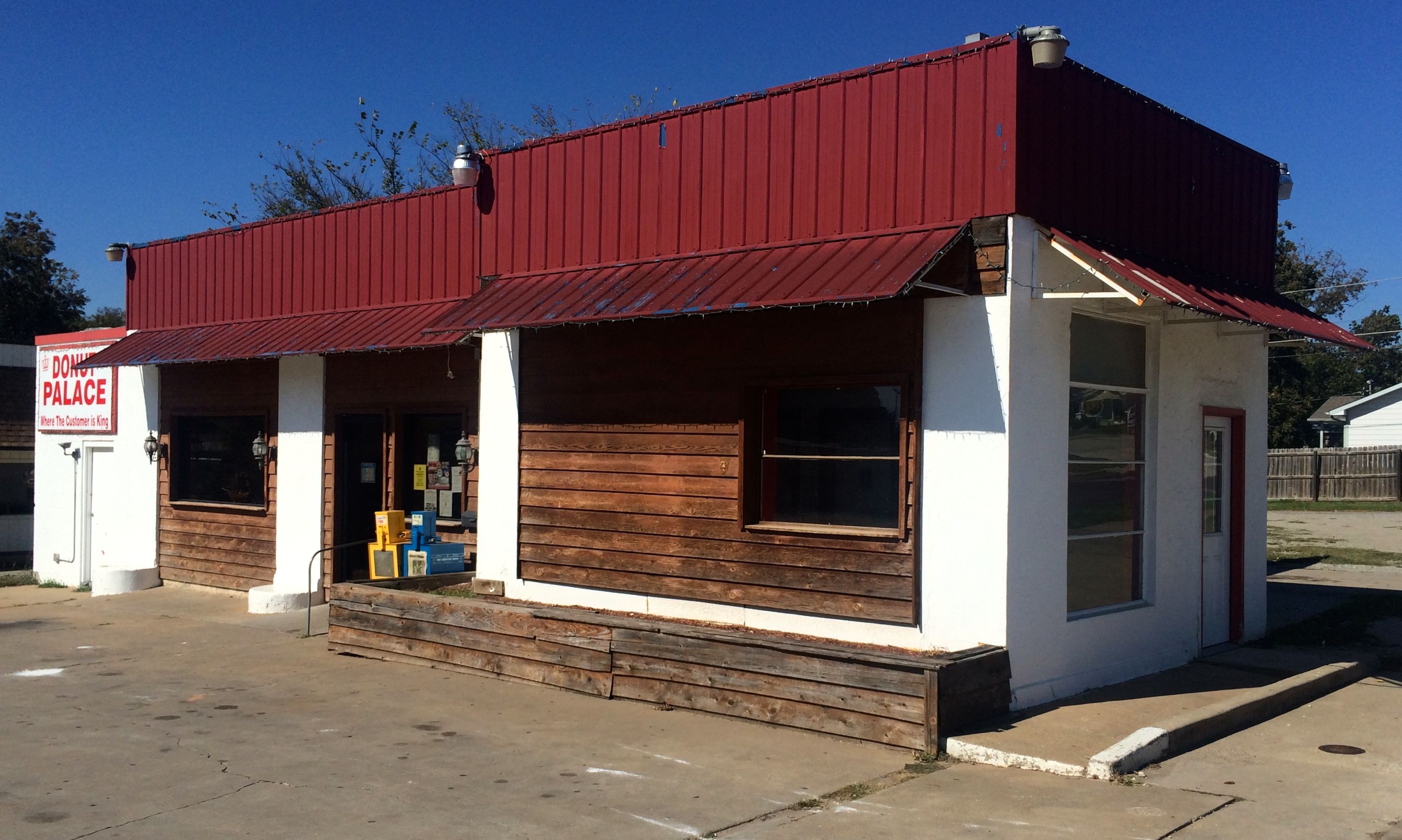

- Location within Oklahoma
- Location: 201 W. Fourth Ave., Bristow, Oklahoma
- Coordinates: 35°49′51″N 96°23′36″W
- Area: less than one acre
- Built: 1923
- Architectural style: Moderne
- MPS: Route 66 in Oklahoma MPS
- NRHP reference No.: 95000034
- Added to NRHP: February 23, 1995

The Texaco Service Station, at 201 W. 4th Ave. in Bristow, Oklahoma, was built in 1923. It was listed on the National Register of Historic Places in 1995.

It is an L-shaped stuccoed building on the northwest corner of Fourth Street (U.S. Route 66) and Elm St.
