= Cushing-Drumright Oil Field =

Oil field in Oklahoma, US

Coordinates: 36.01°N 96.60°W

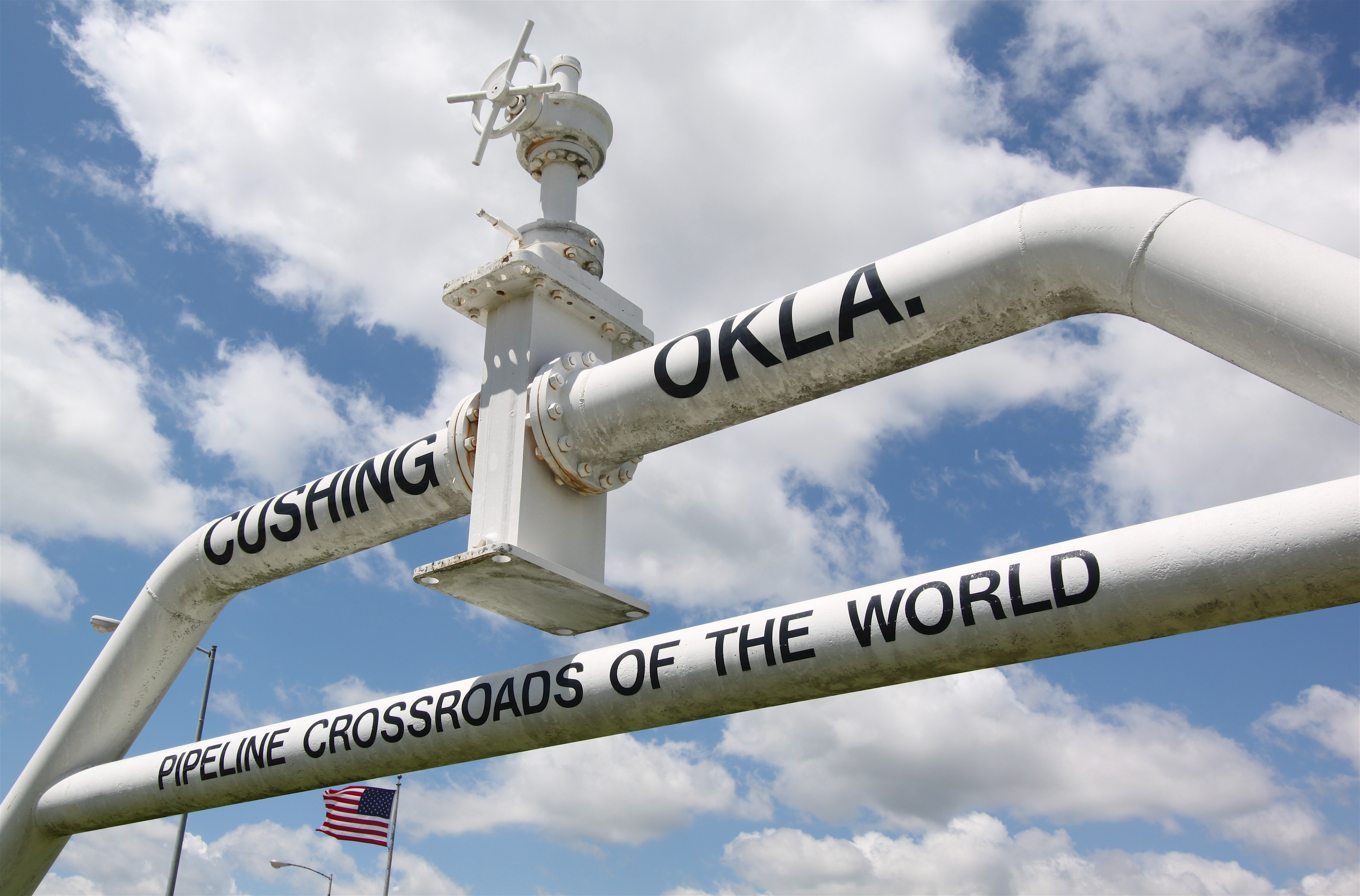
The pipeline monument in Cushing, Oklahoma

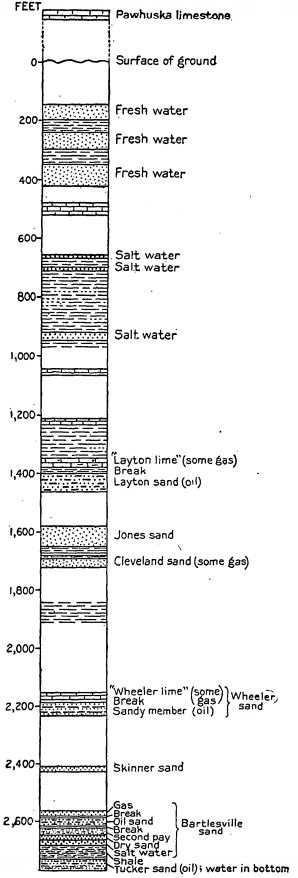
Cushing stratigraphic column, with the relative depths of the Layton, Wheeler, and Bartlesville sands

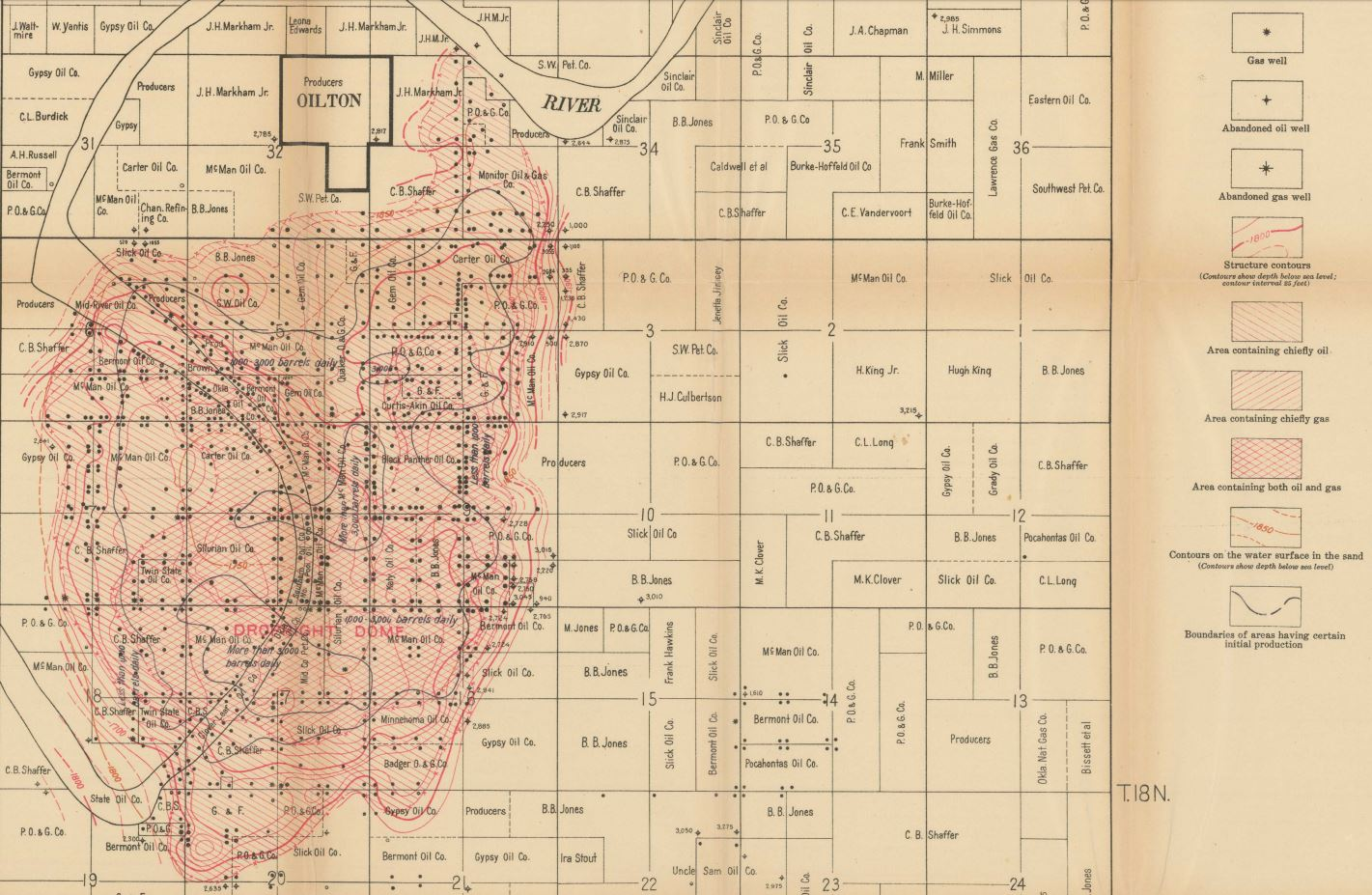
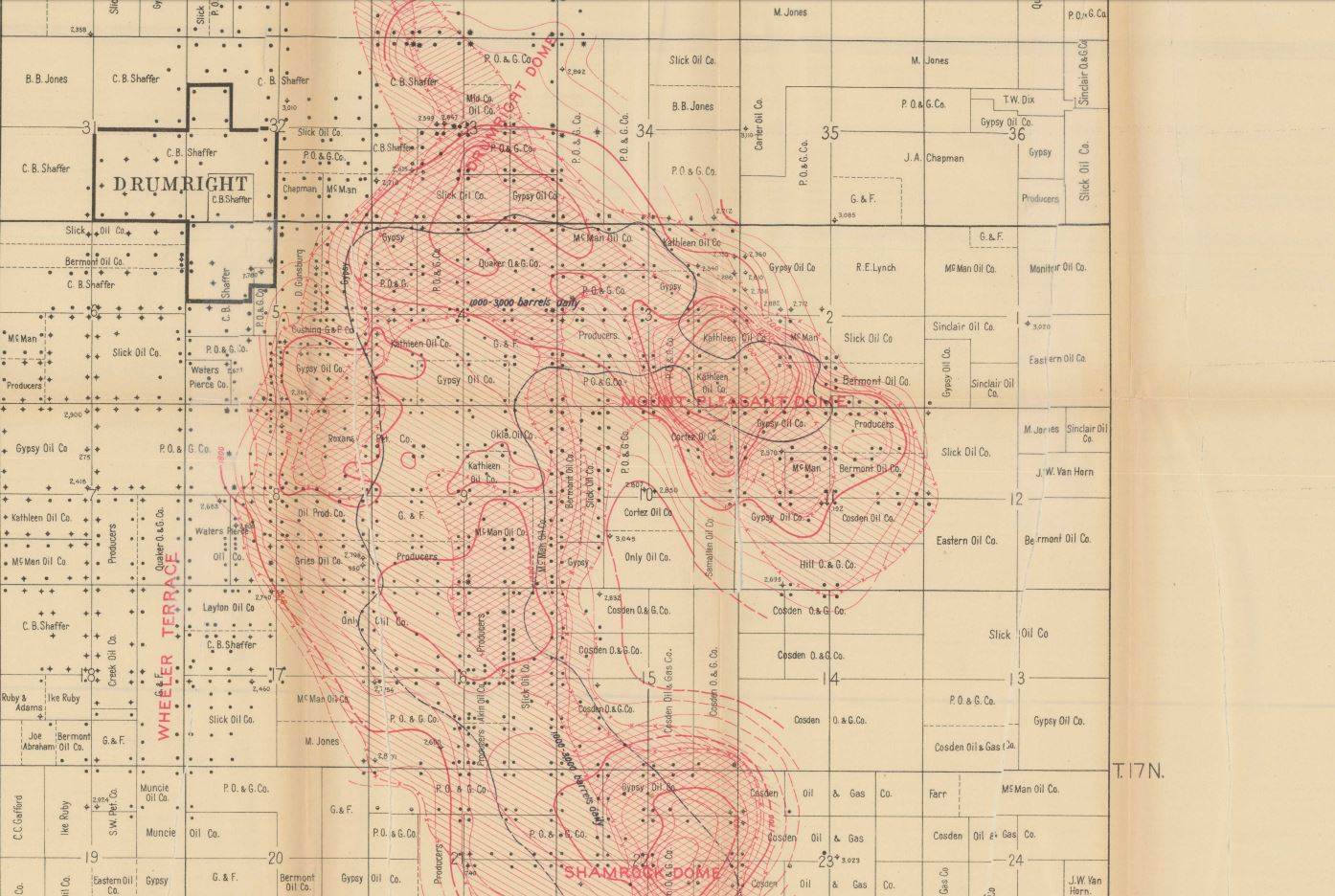
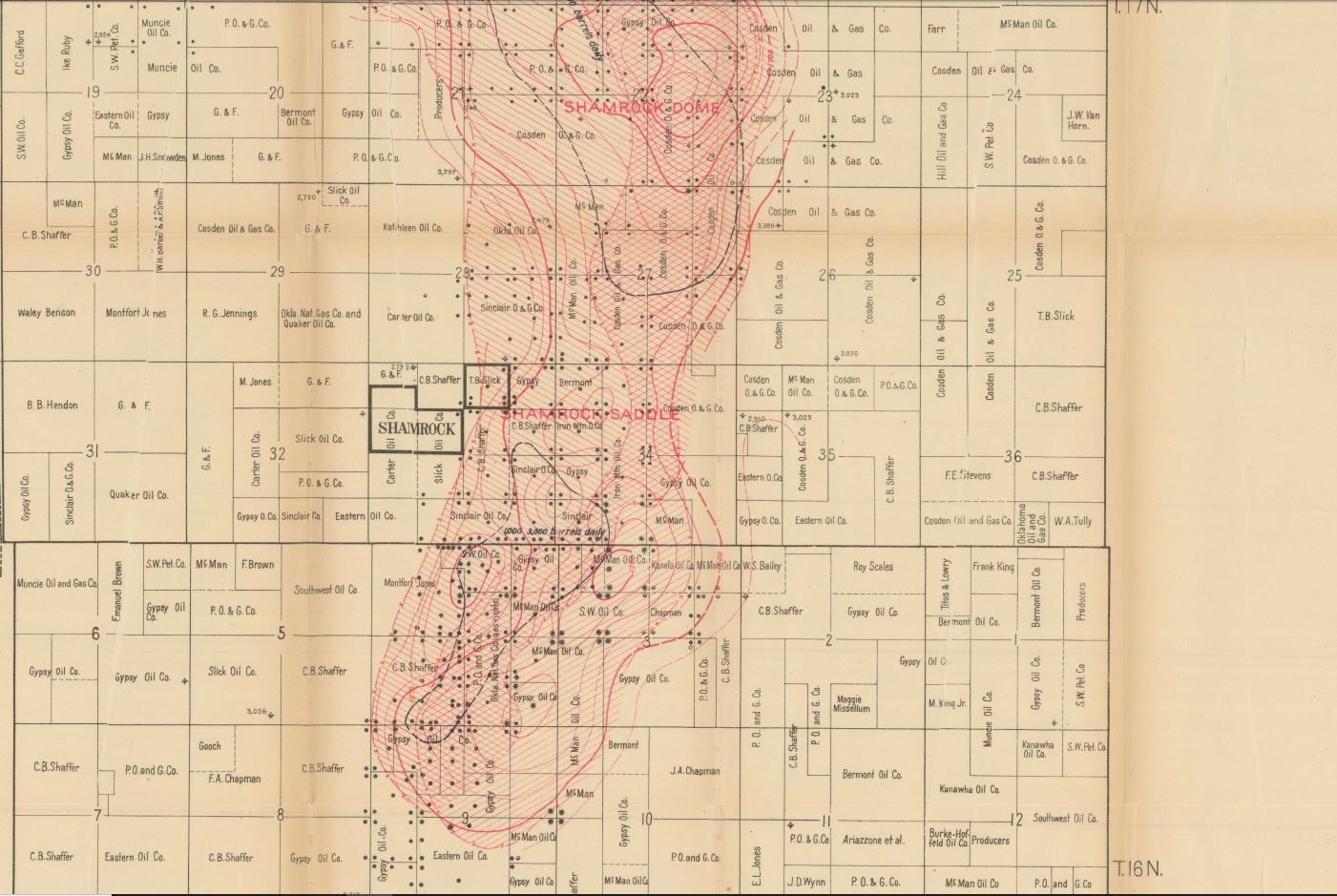
Bartlesville Sand structure map, with the Dropright Dome, Drumright Dome, Mount Pleasant Dome, Shamrock Dome, and Shamrock Saddle (north to south)

The Cushing Oil Field, also known as the Cushing-Drumright Oil Field, is an oil field in northeastern Oklahoma, part of the Mid-Continent oil province. The 10-mile (16 km) by 3-mile (4.8 km) field includes southeastern Payne County, northwestern Creek County, and northeastern Lincoln County. Named for its primary supply center at Cushing, Oklahoma, the field was developed from 1912.

== 20th century production ==
In 1912, the discovery well, the Wheeler No. 1 Oil Well came in near Drumright for wildcatter Thomas Baker Slick, Sr.

Peak production was in May 1917 at 310,000 barrels per day, accounting for two thirds of the refinable crude oil production in the western hemisphere during that time, and provided twenty percent of the petroleum sold in the United States in 1915-1916. At the peak, 3,090 wells were producing, making the field the most significant production field in Oklahoma. The Drumright Dome, near Drumright, Oklahoma, was the first area to be exploited, followed by the Shamrock Dome. The field stimulated the construction of up to fifty refineries and ten natural gasoline ("casinghead gasoline") plants in the area. Production declined quickly after 1920, dropping to 6,209 barrels per day in 1955.

== Geology ==
The Cushing-Drumright Field is defined by four small anticlines, the Dropright Dome, the Drumright Dome, the Shamrock Dome and the Mount Pleasant Dome. The Dropright Dome, named after the former town of Dropright, is the northernmost formation, about 5 miles (8.0 km) in length. The Drumright Dome is named for the town of Drumright, which lies on the west side of the dome. The Mount Pleasant Dome is named for a church on its slope. The Shamrock Dome is close to Shamrock, Oklahoma, and is the southernmost structure. Each structure has a corresponding syncline. The primary production horizons include the Layton Sand, the Wheeler Sand and the Bartlesville Sand.

== History and today ==
The Drumright Gasoline Plant No. 2 is listed on the National Register of Historic Places.

== See also ==
- Jackson Barnett No. 11 Oil Well
- West Texas Intermediate
