= Drumright Gasoline Plant No. 2 =

- U.S. National Register of Historic Places
- Location within Oklahoma
- Nearest city: Drumright, Oklahoma
- Coordinates: 36°00′33″N 96°34′57″W
- Area: 16.7 acres (6.8 ha)
- Built: 1917
- Built by: Sinclair Oil & Gas Co.
- NRHP reference No.: 82003677
- Added to NRHP: July 27, 1982

The Drumright Gasoline Plant No. 2, near Drumright, Oklahoma, began operation August 2, 1917. It was listed on the National Register of Historic Places in 1982. The listing included four contributing buildings and five contributing structures.

It was located north of Drumright and was used to exploit part of the Cushing-Drumright Oil Field.

It included a one-story office building 24 by 118 feet (7.3 m × 36.0 m) in plan. It included an engine room 60 by 140 feet (18 m × 43 m) in plan. It included two original water towers.

It was the only operating casinghead gasoline plant surviving out of about 250 in the area that operated at the peak.

Sometime between 1980 and 2020 it was removed.
