= Bristow Firestone Service Station =

- U.S. National Register of Historic Places
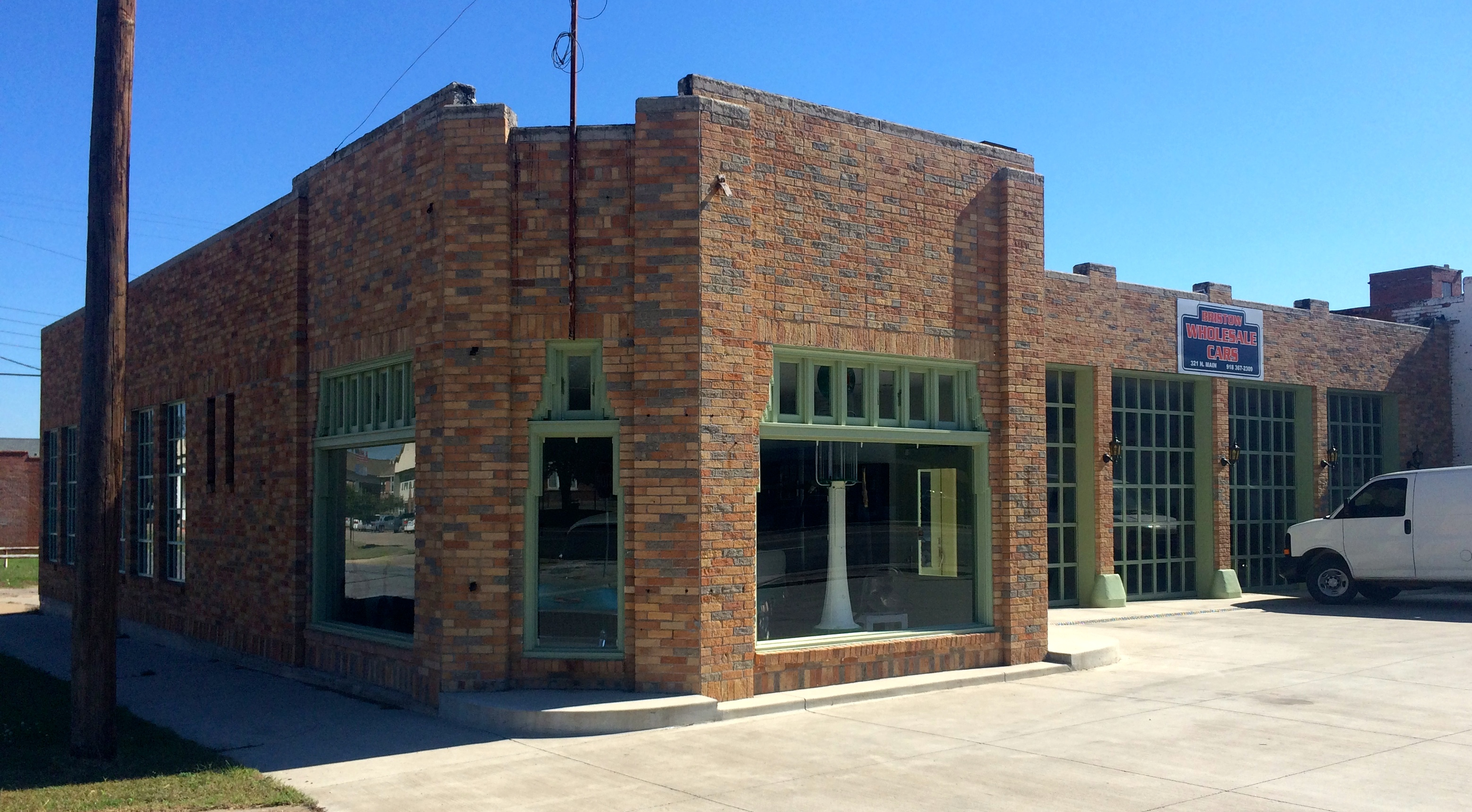

- Location within Oklahoma
- Location: 321 N. Main, Bristow, Oklahoma
- Coordinates: 35°50′07″N 96°23′25″W
- Area: 1.9 acres (0.77 ha)
- Built: 1929
- Architectural style: Art Deco
- MPS: Route 66 and Associated Resources in Oklahoma AD MPS
- NRHP reference No.: 07000912
- Added to NRHP: September 6, 2007

The Bristow Firestone Service Station, at 321 N. Main in Bristow, Oklahoma, was built in 1929. It was listed on the National Register of Historic Places in 2007.

Known also as the Mounce Building, it is an L-shaped, one-story building with Art Deco styling.
