= Thomas Baker Slick Sr. =

American businessman

Thomas Baker Slick
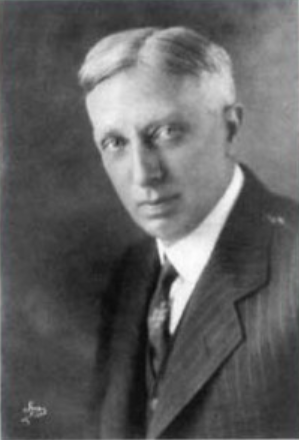
- c. 1920s
- Born: Tom Slick; Shippenville, Clarion County, Pennsylvania, US
- Died: August 16, 1930; Baltimore, Maryland, US
- Occupation: Oilman
- Years active: 1904–1930
- Known for: Discovered Drumright-Cushing oilfield in Oklahoma

Thomas Baker Slick Sr. (12 October 1883 – 16 August 1930) was born in Shippenville, Clarion County, Pennsylvania to Johnson M. and Mary A. Baker Slick. He became notable in 1912 for discovering Oklahoma's then-largest oil field, the Cushing Oil Field.

== Early experience ==
In 1904, Alexander Massey, owner of Spurlock Petroleum Company, hired Tom Slick, who already had acquired a reputation as a good "lease man" to assist him in buying up oil leases. Massey already had a string of successes drilling in Kansas, finding either oil or gas in 25 consecutive wildcat wells. Massey promised to pay Slick a 25 percent share of the proceeds from every lease Slick could obtain. Massey and Slick then traveled to Tryon, Oklahoma to start drilling. Slick continued buying up leases, (Note: Slick ultimately obtained leases on 25,000 acres (100,000,000 m^{2}) in the area.) while Massey supervised the drilling.

Massey ran out of money by the time the well reached a depth of only 2,800 feet (850 m). He also ran out of patience and decided to drill a well near Kendrick, Oklahoma. It also turned up dry. The relationship between Slick and Massey apparently soured, because the two parted ways. Tom moved to Chicago, where he was hired as a lease man by Charles B. Shaffer of the Shaffer & Smathers Company. The company sent him to Kentucky, western Canada, and eventually, back to Oklahoma. During this time, he drilled at least ten dry holes, and acquired the nickname of "Dry Hole Slick."

== Turnaround ==
Returning to the Tryon area, where he had his first setback, Slick began acquiring new leases. A local newspaper, the Bristow Record, reported that few people, "... had stuck to wildcatting longer than Slick and his associates..." (Note: He had acquired a new nickname, "Mad Tom Slick.") Slick moved his operation to Cushing, Oklahoma, about 35 miles (56 km) away. The Cushing Independent encouraged land-owning readers to deal with Slick. In January, 1912, The Shaffer and Slick group spudded in ("spudding" is an oil industry term meaning the beginning of actual drilling operations) its first well on the farm of Frank Wheeler.

Oklahoma's largest oil field up to about 1920 was discovered in 1912 by Slick who thereafter became known as the "King of the Wildcatters". Determined to become a millionaire, Slick came to Oklahoma during the winter of 1911 to find "the big one". Although Slick initially found nothing but "dusters" (dry holes), perseverance and luck eventually brought him to the farm of Frank Wheeler, located approximately 12 miles (19 km) east of Cushing, Oklahoma, in what would become Drumright, Oklahoma, where "the smell of oil sands was perfume to his nostrils". Wheeler had purchased his land, located in the midst of allotments forced upon reluctant Creek Indians, for sixty-five cents an acre shortly before statehood in 1907. Slick would soon make Wheeler a rich man.

Wheeler had heard of the riches of the Osage Nation and the Glenn Pool, and he readily agreed to lease his land for a dollar an acre. Slick obtained financial backing from bankers at Bristow and a Tulsa attorney, and soon drilling was underway on the Wheeler No. 1 well. The wary investors pulled out of the project, however, when the well reached a depth of 2,000 feet without results. Slick borrowed some money, traveled to Chicago, and eventually secured the backing of C. B. Shaffer, who had made his fortune in the Pennsylvania oil fields. Then returning to the Wheeler farm, Slick selected a more promising site and began drilling once again. On March 12, 1912, his dreams became reality as his drill bit struck a gigantic gas deposit in a thick stratum of oil-bearing sand. Crude oil spewed forty feet above the derrick. Eventually the well was deepened to between 2,319 feet (707 m) and 2,347 feet (715 m) and produced 400 barrels of oil per day (BPD). (Note: In the oil industry, oil is reported as barrels, where each barrel counts as 42 U.S. gallons. Thus 400 BPD is 16800 gallons per day.) Within one month Wheeler was receiving $125.00 in royalties every day. Two years later the total royalties had doubled as other producers were brought in on Wheeler's land.

Slick hurriedly informed Shaffer and instructed him to send experienced lease traders. Meanwhile, he quickly capped the well and spread fresh dirt on the pools of oil spilled by the gusher, thereby hoping to keep the new find a secret. Slick also quietly made cash deposits to reserve all the horses and buggies in Cushing to hamper the efforts of competing lease bidders who were sure to descend on the area when news of the strike became widespread. Slick's efforts were successful for a few days, but on March 21, 1912, the Cushing Democrat proclaimed to the world that a "Splendid Oil Find" had taken place. The great rush to the area began. The Tryon Star wrote: “Our old friend Tom Slick the oilman has struck it rich…Slick has been plugging away for several years and has put down several dry holes...He deserves this success and here’s hoping that it will make Tom his millions.”

It soon turned out that Wheeler No. 1 was the first producing well in what would be called the Drumright-Cushing field, which would produce for the next 35 years. At its peak in 1917, the field produced 330,000 BPD of oil. This well was added to the National Register of Historic Places on March 14, 1983. Although the natural well pressure in the well has long since dropped too low to support primary oil production, secondary recovery techniques have enabled the well to keep producing at lower rates. It was still producing as of March 17, 2012, when the city of Drumright celebrated its centennial.

Wheeler No. 1 not only made Frank Wheeler a very rich man, but it made a positive change in Tom Slick's fortunes. For the next 18 years his leases and wells paid off handsomely and consistently. He had plays in some of major domestic fields, including Pioneer, Tonkawa, Papoose, and Seminole. By 1929, he was called the largest independent oil operator in the United States with a net worth estimated between $35 million and $100 million. Never again did anyone call him "Dry Hole Slick." His nickname became "Tom Slick - King of the Wildcatters."

The Slick Oil Co. was founded in October 1914 and for a rumored $2,000,000 took over the property of Thomas Baker Slick Sr. in the Cushing field, to wit: 30 wells producing 4,414bpd and a large acreage. The company was a 50-50 joint venture of Okla Oil Co. (renamed Tidal Oil Co. when it became part of Tide Water Oil Co. ca. 1916) and Milliken Oil Co. (which became part of Sinclair Oil & Refining Corp in 1916).

== Family ==
Tom married Berenice Frates, the eldest daughter of Joseph A. and Lula M. (née Buck) Frates. Tom's father-in-law was well known in the railroad business. Later the two men became partners in various transportation ventures. Their most notable successes were building Nuyaka, Oklahoma and Slick, Oklahoma, two boomtowns near Okmulgee, Oklahoma.

Tom and Berenice had three children: Thomas Baker, Betty and Earl Frates. Tom Jr went on to be a noted inventor and cryptozoologist. Earl F. Slick founded Slick Airways, one of the first US scheduled freight airlines.

== Death ==
Thomas Baker Slick Sr. died of a stroke in Baltimore, Maryland in August 1930. He was 46 years old.

Slick's widow, Berenice, survived him and later married one of his business partners, Charles F. Urschel. Urschel had previously married Tom's sister, Flored. After Flored died in 1931, Urschel married Tom's widow. Urschel became nationally known in 1933, when he and another wealthy business man were kidnapped at gunpoint and held for ransom by a gang led by Machine Gun Kelly.
