= Bristow, Oklahoma =

City in Oklahoma, US

Bristow, Oklahoma Coskv Tvlofv (Creek)
- City
- Main Street in Bristow

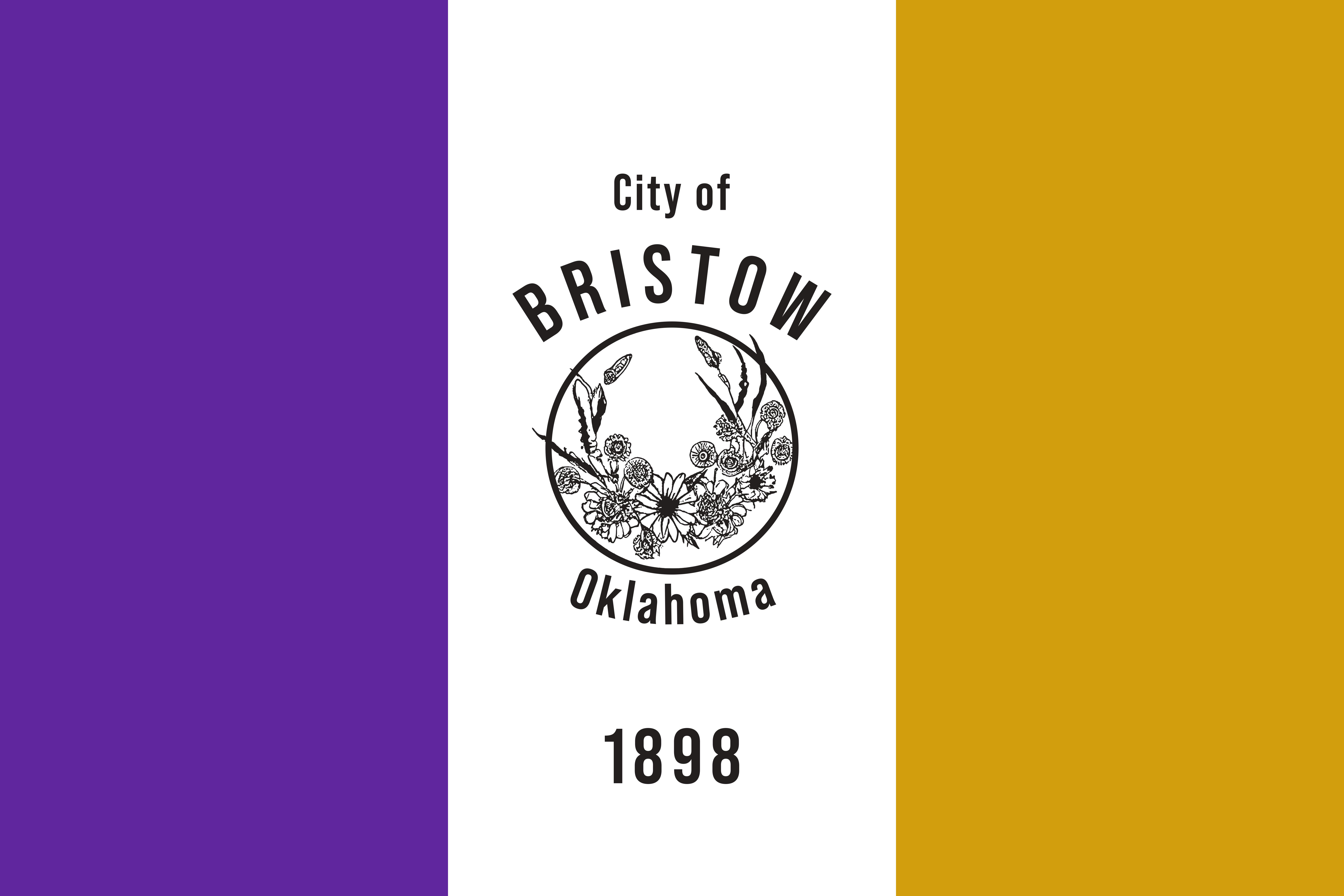
- Flag
- Nickname: Woodland Queen of the Creek Nation.
- Location within Creek County, and the state of Oklahoma
- Coordinates: 35°50′01″N 96°23′39″W
- Country: United States
- State: Oklahoma
- County: Creek

Area
  - Total: 3.53 sq mi (9.15 km^{2})
  - Land: 3.46 sq mi (8.96 km^{2})
  - Water: 0.077 sq mi (0.20 km^{2})
- Elevation: 820 ft (250 m)

Population (2020)
  - Total: 4,248
  - Density: 1,228.5/sq mi (474.34/km^{2})
- Demonym: Bristonian
- Time zone: UTC-6 (Central (CST))
  - Summer (DST): UTC-5 (CDT)
- ZIP code: 74010
- Area codes: 539/918
- FIPS code: 40-08900
- GNIS feature ID: 2409913
- Website: www.cityofbristowok.org

Bristow (Creek: Coskv Tvlofv) is a city in Creek County, Oklahoma, United States. The population as of the 2020 census was 4,248, up slightly from the population of 4,222 reported at the 2010 census.

== History ==
Bristow began in 1898, when the St. Louis–San Francisco Railway ("SL&SF") built a track between Sapulpa and Oklahoma City. The town was named for Joseph L. Bristow, an Assistant U.S. Postmaster General who later served as a U.S. senator from Kansas. A post office was established April 25, 1898. By the 1900 census, the population was 626.

Downtown Bristow as seen 11-2026; note it still has brick streets in some locations

Bristow was originally designated by the statehood constitutional convention as the county seat for Moman County-- later Creek County-- prior to statehood, when the town's population was about 1,134. However, the convention later designated Sapulpa, with the proviso that an election could be held after statehood. The county held such an election on August 20, 1908, amidst arguments that Bristow was more centrally located, but Sapulpa was the center of population in the county. Sapulpa won, setting off a multi-year cycle of petitions, court challenges and new elections. A final vote was held November 20, 1912, and a court conclusively ruled Sapulpa to be the winner on August 13, 1913.

The local economy depended heavily on cotton. Bristow had seven cotton gins and two cottonseed oil mills in the early 20th century. Other farms in the surrounding area produced corn, peanuts, potatoes and fruit. Oil and gas were discovered in the area around 1915. The discovery led to the construction of three refineries and four pipeline companies by 1930. The Oklahoma-Southwestern Railway built a short line from a connection with the SL&SF at Bristow through the oilfields to Slick in 1920, but declining oilfield production and other factors lead to abandonment of that trackage in 1930. The peak census population was 6,619 in 1930.

== Geography ==
Bristow is located in northern Oklahoma, just south of the geographic center of Creek County. According to the United States Census Bureau, the city has a total area of 3.6 square miles (9.3 km^{2}), of which 3.6 square miles (9.2 km^{2}) is land and 0.08 square miles (0.2 km^{2}), or 1.66%, is water.

Interstate 44, the Turner Turnpike, passes through the northern part of the city, with access from Exit 196. I-44 leads northeast 20 miles (32 km) to Sapulpa and 33 miles (53 km) to downtown Tulsa, and southwest 76 miles (122 km) to Oklahoma City. Oklahoma State Highway 66, formerly U.S. Route 66, passes through the center of Bristow and generally parallels I-44.

=== Climate ===
Climate data for Bristow, Oklahoma
Month	Jan	Feb	Mar	Apr	May	Jun	Jul	Aug	Sep	Oct	Nov	Dec	Year
Mean daily maximum °F (°C)	49.5 (9.7)	55.3 (12.9)	65.3 (18.5)	75.4 (24.1)	81.3 (27.4)	88.5 (31.4)	94.9 (34.9)	94.2 (34.6)	86.0 (30.0)	76.8 (24.9)	63.0 (17.2)	52.3 (11.3)	73.5 (23.1)
Mean daily minimum °F (°C)	23.9 (−4.5)	28.6 (−1.9)	38.0 (3.3)	49.1 (9.5)	57.0 (13.9)	65.2 (18.4)	69.2 (20.7)	67.5 (19.7)	60.0 (15.6)	49.2 (9.6)	38.0 (3.3)	27.8 (−2.3)	47.8 (8.8)
Average precipitation inches (mm)	1.4 (36)	1.9 (48)	3.0 (76)	3.3 (84)	5.5 (140)	3.9 (99)	2.7 (69)	2.7 (69)	4.6 (120)	3.2 (81)	2.9 (74)	2.1 (53)	37.2 (940)
Source: Weatherbase.com

== Demographics ==
Historical population
Census	Pop.	Note	%±
1900	626		—
1910	1,667		166.3%
1920	3,460		107.6%
1930	6,630		91.6%
1940	6,050		−8.7%
1950	5,400		−10.7%
1960	4,795		−11.2%
1970	4,653		−3.0%
1980	4,702		1.1%
1990	4,062		−13.6%
2000	4,325		6.5%
2010	4,222		−2.4%
2020	4,248		0.6%
U.S. Decennial Census

=== 2020 census ===
As of the 2020 census, Bristow had a population of 4,248. The median age was 35.9 years. 28.2% of residents were under the age of 18 and 17.7% of residents were 65 years of age or older. For every 100 females there were 90.7 males, and for every 100 females age 18 and over there were 84.7 males age 18 and over.

<0.1% of residents lived in urban areas, while 100.0% lived in rural areas.

There were 1,665 households in Bristow, of which 37.0% had children under the age of 18 living in them. Of all households, 35.0% were married-couple households, 20.7% were households with a male householder and no spouse or partner present, and 36.9% were households with a female householder and no spouse or partner present. About 33.5% of all households were made up of individuals and 17.1% had someone living alone who was 65 years of age or older.

There were 1,995 housing units, of which 16.5% were vacant. Among occupied housing units, 53.7% were owner-occupied and 46.3% were renter-occupied. The homeowner vacancy rate was 3.1% and the rental vacancy rate was 11.9%.

Racial composition as of the 2020 census
Race	Percent
White	66.5%
Black or African American	6.7%
American Indian and Alaska Native	10.8%
Asian	0.5%
Native Hawaiian and Other Pacific Islander	0.1%
Some other race	0.8%
Two or more races	14.6%
Hispanic or Latino (of any race)	4.4%

=== 2000 census ===
As of the 2000 census, there were 4,325 people, 1,793 households, and 1,161 families residing in the city. The population density was 1,299.2 inhabitants per square mile (501.6/km^{2}). There were 2,019 housing units at an average density of 606.5 per square mile (234.2/km^{2}). The racial makeup of the city was 75.42% White, 8.51% African American, 10.64% Native American, 0.16% Asian, 0.44% from other races, and 4.83% from two or more races. Hispanic or Latino of any race were 2.01% of the population.

There were 1,793 households, out of which 31.5% had children under the age of 18 living with them, 41.7% were married couples living together, 17.8% had a female householder with no husband present, and 35.2% were non-families. 32.1% of all households were made up of individuals, and 16.3% had someone living alone who was 65 years of age or older. The average household size was 2.37 and the average family size was 2.98.

In the city, the population was spread out, with 27.9% under the age of 18, 9.2% from 18 to 24, 24.4% from 25 to 44, 20.1% from 45 to 64, and 18.4% who were 65 years of age or older. The median age was 36 years. For every 100 females, there were 83.0 males. For every 100 females age 18 and over, there were 79.1 males.

The median income for a household in the city was $24,351, and the median income for a family was $31,618. Males had a median income of $28,475 versus $21,711 for females. The per capita income for the city was $13,819. About 15.8% of families and 20.9% of the population were below the poverty line, including 34.5% of those under age 18 and 14.3% of those age 65 or over.

== Economy ==
From its inception, Bristow's economy centered on agriculture, and specifically on growing and processing cotton. By the early 1900s, Bristow had seven cotton gins and two cotton-seed oil mills. Additionally, other farmers in the area produced corn, peanuts, Irish potatoes, and fruits.

Oil and natural gas were discovered nearby in 1914 - 1915, producing an economic boom lasting until 1923. The boom also caused a population spike. According to the Encyclopedia of Oklahoma History and Culture, nearly 31,000 people lived within a few miles radius of Bristow in 1920.

Although the boom cooled by 1925, by 1930 the city was the site of three oil refineries, four pipeline facilities and offices for several petroleum-related companies. KFRU, one of Oklahoma's first radio stations, started broadcasting from Bristow in January 1925.

Some manufacturing facilities were added during the 1960s, including Bristow Mattress Factory, the Glassmarc Corporation (manufacturer of fiberglass boats and other items), Artemis Incorporated (manufacturer of women's garments), and the U.S. Carpet Company.

Kratos Defense & Security Solutions is expected to open a jet engine production line in 2026, initially creating 60 jobs.

== Government ==
Bristow has a home rule form of government.

== Transportation ==
Bristow Historical Train Depot and Museum

Bristow is on Interstate 44, Oklahoma State Highway 66 (the old Route 66), Oklahoma State Highway 48, and Oklahoma State Highway 16.

Jones Memorial Airport (FAA ID: 3F7), about 3 miles to the southwest, contains a 4001’x75’ asphalt runway completed in June 2020. The airport has an annual economic impact of $7.2 million. Commercial flights go in and out of Tulsa International Airport, about 40 minutes away.

Rail freight service is provided by the Stillwater Central Railroad. Passenger trains no longer stop in Bristow, but the Bristow Historical Train Depot & Museum is open for visitation, complete with the original wood floors from 1923.

The Freeland Center in Bristow, November 2026

== Arts and entertainment ==
The Freeland Center for the Performing Arts opened in 2009. The 795-seat theater cost $6.1 million, paid for by a combination of public and private funding. The Center opened with a concert, but is dedicated to diverse experiences which promote a spirit of cultural enjoyment.

The Bristow News, previously the Bristow News and Record Citizen, has been reporting events in Bristow and surrounding areas since 1899.

== Parks and recreation ==
The NRHP-listed Klingensmith Park Amphitheater in Bristow, November 2026

Klingensmith Park is a 320-acre facility featuring Lake Mesina, as well as the NRHP-listed Klingensmith Park Amphitheater, which was a WPA project from 1936 dedicated by Eleanor Roosevelt in 1937, and still in use.

The Town Square opens onto Historic Route 66/Main Street. It is complete with a small amphitheater and is the site of many community activities.

The Leon Pinson Sports Complex, previously the Bristow Sports Complex, has two softball fields and two baseball fields, as well as the Bristow Rodeo Grounds.

The VFW Post 3656 Wake Island Memorial, complete with a display of artillery and military equipment, commemorates the Battle of Wake Island during World War II.

Bristow Golf & Country Club has a public 9-hole regulation-length course.

Heyburn Lake is about 13 miles to the northeast. RV and tent camping is available, and the lake features picnic areas, a playground, a boat launch, swimming and fishing.

== NRHP Sites ==
Restored and moved Chrysler Plymouth neon sign

Besides the Klingensmith Park Amphitheater, NRHP sites in Bristow include:

The old Beard Motor Company, a/k/a Bristow Chrysler Plymouth, at 210 E. 9th, being two blocks off Main near its intersection with the old Route 66. Built in 1947, the facility is notable not only for its Art Moderne style, but also for its Chrysler Plymouth tower/sign out front, intended to be visible to Route 66 traffic. This is not to be confused with the Bristow Motor Company Building at 500 N. Main, which is also NRHP-listed. On August 1, 2025, state leaders broke ground on a $1 million project to refurbish and relocate the 102’-tall Chrysler Tower two blocks closer to Route 66, to better serve as a tourist attraction and an economic booster for the community. The project culminated with a relighting ceremony on April 11, 2026.

The Art Deco style Bristow Firestone Service Station at 321 N. Main, the Gothic Revival style Bristow Presbyterian Church at 6th and Elm, and the Creek Masonic Lodge No. 226 at 417 N. Main, are all substantial buildings that are NRHP-listed.

Highway-associated sites include the Texaco Service Station at 201 W. 4th Ave., the Bristow Tire Shop at 115 W. Fourth St., the Tank Farm Loop Route 66 Roadbed at the junction of SH-66 and Old Highway 66 0.6 miles west of the I-44 overpass, and the Little Deep Fork Creek Bridge east of the junction of E0830 Rd. and N3700 Rd.

== Notable people ==
- Brent Ashabranner, Peace Corps administrator and author, lived in Bristow during his teen years in the 1930s
- Gene Autry, actor, rodeo performer, and singer known as The Singing Cowboy, was a telegrapher in Bristow's Frisco Train Depot, now known as the Bristow Historical Train Depot & Museum.
- Charles Crawford, football running back, Philadelphia Eagles (1986–1987)
- Josiah Henson, bronze medalist at the 1952 Summer Olympics
- Robert Hughes, Winningest boys high school basketball coach in the United States with 1,333 wins
- Clovis Maksoud, diplomat, writer, and journalist
- Tom Paxton, folk singer, moved to Bristow with his parents in 1948
- Albert A. Rollestone, philanthropist and oil pioneer, lived in Bristow 1915–1924
- Norma Smallwood, Miss America 1926, first Native American Miss America, married Thomas Gilcrease 1928
- Robert Symonds, actor
- Joe Lee Wilson, jazz singer
