= Drumright, Oklahoma =

City in Oklahoma, US

- City
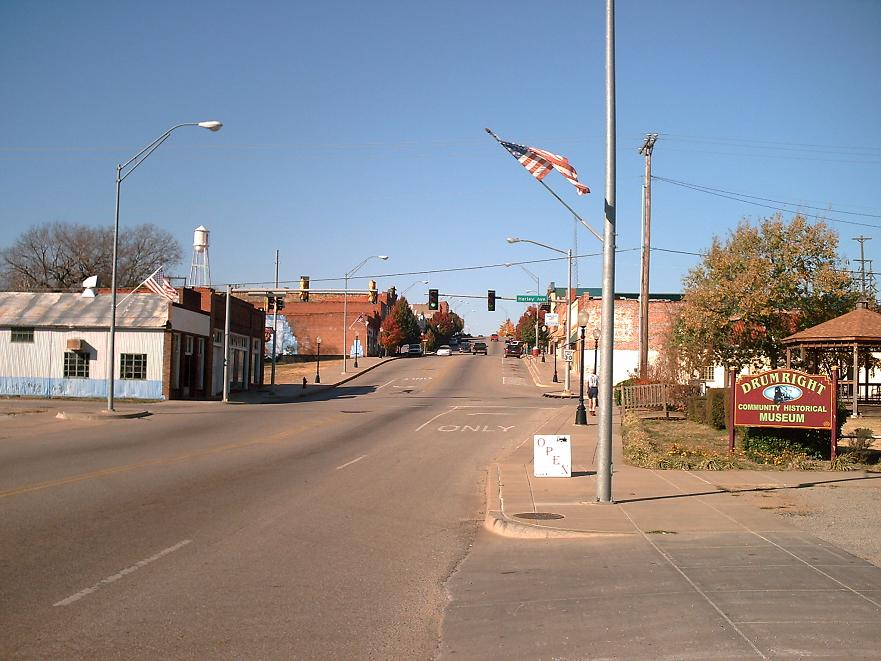
- Downtown Drumright (2010)
- Motto: "Oklahoma's Boomtown"
- Location within Creek County in Oklahoma
- Coordinates: 35°59′26″N 96°35′52″W
- Country: United States
- State: Oklahoma
- Counties: Creek, Payne

Area
  - Total: 7.39 sq mi (19.15 km^{2})
  - Land: 7.39 sq mi (19.14 km^{2})
  - Water: 0.0039 sq mi (0.01 km^{2})
- Elevation: 791 ft (241 m)

Population (2020)
  - Total: 2,560
  - Density: 346.5/sq mi (133.77/km^{2})
- Time zone: UTC-6 (Central (CST))
  - Summer (DST): UTC-5 (CDT)
- ZIP code: 74030
- Area codes: 539/918
- FIPS code: 40-21750
- GNIS feature ID: 2410360
- Website: cityofdrumright.com

Drumright is a city in Creek and Payne counties in the U.S. state of Oklahoma. It began as an oil boom town. However, the population has declined as oil production has waned in the area. As of the 2020 census, Drumright had a population of 2,560. Drumright and nearby Cushing were at the center of the large, productive Cushing-Drumright Oil Field in the 1910s and 1920s. Now Drumright is home to a festival called The Drumright Monthly Market, where hundreds of visitors come on the first Saturday of every month, seeking crafts and delicacies from all over the region.

== History ==
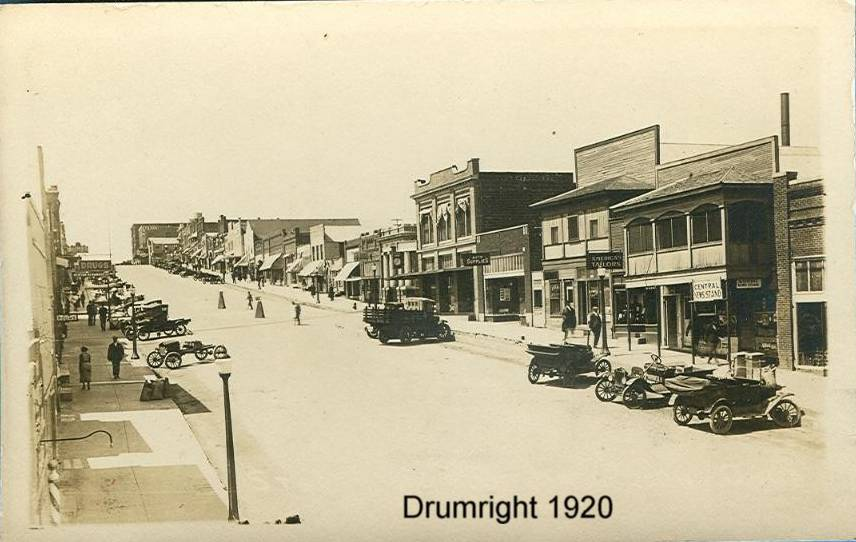
Historical Drumright (1920)

The town sprang up nearly overnight in 1912, after wildcatter Thomas Baker Slick struck oil on the farm of Frank Wheeler, causing a rush of speculators, oilfield workers, and merchants into the area. A post office was established in the community on December 28, 1912. Local landowners James W. Fulkerson and Aaron Drumright platted a townsite, which was initially called Fulkerson, The town was renamed for Aaron Drumright, a farmer and later local businessman whose farm was part of the townsite.

Oil workers flooded into town so quickly that they lived in tents or shacks made from box cars, causing the community to be known locally as "Ragtown." Hotels and boarding houses were constructed next, as well as amenities like gambling dens, dance halls, and roadhouses, where the workers could spend their money. Drumright incorporated as a town on May 27, 1913. In 1914, the city built a two-story building of stone to serve as an elementary and high school. It was called Washington School, and is listed on the National Register of Historic Places (NRIS 81000462). Two banks opened in the town during 1914. Drumright was designated a first-class city after an election on April 18, 1916. The 1920 census reported a population of 6,460.

The Oil Fields and Santa Fe Railway, an Atchison, Topeka & Santa Fe Railroad (AT&SF) subsidiary, built a track from Frey Junction (south of Oilton) to Drumright in 1915. The following year, the AT&SF built a line north from Shamrock to Drumright. The Oil Fields and Santa Fe Railway was merged into the AT&SF in 1941.

In 1919 a riot broke out in Drumright during a strike by telephone workers. The town's mayor and chief of police were locked in the town jail by rioters. The Governor of Oklahoma sent six militia units to town to restore order.

Drumright hosted minor league baseball. The Drumright Oilers teams played as members of the Class D level Western Association and Oklahoma State League between 1920 and 1923. In the fall of 1922, Babe Ruth and his New York Yankees teammate Bob Meusel played in an exhibition game in Drumright while on a barnstorming tour.

Beginning with the Depression of the 1930s, the town declined as oil production waned, and a large refinery at the edge of town closed in the 1950s.

Tornadoes have caused loss of life and property damage in Drumright on at least two occasions: on April 2, 1956, when five people were killed and several homes, a school, and the public library were damaged; and on June 8, 1974, when 12 people were killed, a nursing home was destroyed, and about 100 homes were damaged or destroyed.

== Geography ==
Drumright is located in western Creek County. A small portion of the city extends west into Payne County. Drumright is 26 miles (42 km) west of Sapulpa, 42 miles southwest of Tulsa and 76 miles northeast of Oklahoma City at the junction of State Highways 16, 33 and 99. According to the United States Census Bureau, the city has a total area of 7.5 square miles (19.5 km^{2}), of which 0.02 square miles (0.04 km^{2}), or 0.19%, is water.

== Demographics ==
Historical population
Census	Pop.	Note	%±
1920	6,460		—
1930	4,972		−23.0%
1940	4,303		−13.5%
1950	5,028		16.8%
1960	4,029		−19.9%
1970	2,740		−32.0%
1980	3,278		19.6%
1990	2,799		−14.6%
2000	2,905		3.8%
2010	2,907		0.1%
2020	2,560		−11.9%
U.S. Decennial Census

=== 2020 census ===
As of the 2020 census, Drumright had a population of 2,560. The median age was 38.9 years. 25.3% of residents were under the age of 18 and 17.5% of residents were 65 years of age or older. For every 100 females there were 91.0 males, and for every 100 females age 18 and over there were 89.0 males age 18 and over.

0% of residents lived in urban areas, while 100.0% lived in rural areas.

There were 1,075 households in Drumright, of which 32.4% had children under the age of 18 living in them. Of all households, 39.4% were married-couple households, 20.7% were households with a male householder and no spouse or partner present, and 32.7% were households with a female householder and no spouse or partner present. About 31.7% of all households were made up of individuals and 13.6% had someone living alone who was 65 years of age or older.

There were 1,327 housing units, of which 19.0% were vacant. Among occupied housing units, 59.5% were owner-occupied and 40.5% were renter-occupied. The homeowner vacancy rate was 4.5% and the rental vacancy rate was 9.7%.

Racial composition as of the 2020 census
Race	Percent
White	80.7%
Black or African American	1.7%
American Indian and Alaska Native	7.3%
Asian	0.2%
Native Hawaiian and Other Pacific Islander	0.1%
Some other race	0.5%
Two or more races	9.5%
Hispanic or Latino (of any race)	2.8%

=== 2000 census ===
As of the census of 2000, there were 2,905 people, 1,209 households, and 790 families residing in the city. The population density was 411.8 inhabitants per square mile (159.0/km^{2}). There were 1,378 housing units at an average density of 195.4 per square mile (75.4/km^{2}). The racial makeup of the city was 84.44% White, 0.93% African American, 8.47% Native American, 0.03% Asian, 0.17% from other races, and 5.96% from two or more races. Hispanic or Latino of any race were 0.90% of the population.

There were 1,209 households, out of which 29.9% had children under the age of 18 living with them, 47.5% were married couples living together, 14.2% had a female householder with no husband present, and 34.6% were non-families. 31.0% of all households were made up of individuals, and 16.5% had someone living alone who was 65 years of age or older. The average household size was 2.34 and the average family size was 2.92.

In the city, the population was spread out, with 25.5% under the age of 18, 8.0% from 18 to 24, 25.2% from 25 to 44, 20.3% from 45 to 64, and 20.9% who were 65 years of age or older. The median age was 38 years. For every 100 females, there were 87.5 males. For every 100 females age 18 and over, there were 81.2 males.

The median income for a household in the city was $27,292, and the median income for a family was $34,761. Males had a median income of $30,069 versus $20,123 for females. The per capita income for the city was $14,511. About 13.7% of families and 17.3% of the population were below the poverty line, including 19.7% of those under age 18 and 11.0% of those age 65 or over.

== Government ==
Drumright has a council-manager form of government. The Mayor is Mark Whinnery. The Vice Mayor is Jeremy Snow. The other city commissioners are Terry Young, Tabitha Snell and Misty Cook. The City Manager is Shawn Gibson.

City Hall is located at 424 E Broadway.

The Library is located at 104 E Broadway.

The Fire Department is located at 116 W Broadway.

The Police Department is located at 122 W Broadway.

The Chamber of Commerce is located at 103 W Broadway

== Economy ==
Today, manufacturing, oil, gas, education, medicine and agriculture are the largest local industries. Drumright is home to an area vocational and technical school, Central Technology Center, which opened August 22, 1970, and employs about 125 people. Drumright is also home to the Drumright Regional Hospital. A tourist attraction is the Tidewater Winery that opened in a historic building that once served as a school for the children of refinery workers.

== Transportation ==
Drumright is at the eastern intersection of State Highway 33 (east-west) and State Highway 99 (north-south). It is also the western terminus of State Highway 16 (also east–west, but further to the south of SH-33).

The nearest airfield is Cushing Municipal Airport, about 12 miles west-southwest. The nearest commercial field is Tulsa International Airport, about 50 miles (80 km) east-northeast.

== Education ==
Drumright School District includes approximately 500 students in two school buildings. Bradley Elementary serves Pre-K, Kindergarten, and 1st through 5th. Cooper Middle School serves 6th through 8th, while in another part of the same building, Drumright High School serves 9th through 12th.

Central Tech, the marketing name for the Central Technology Center, previously Central Vo-Tech, is an affiliate of Oklahoma CareerTech, the state's system of career and technology education. Central Tech offers full-time and short-term classes in a large variety of fields.

== Parks and attractions ==
Drumright buildings sport multiple murals, including the Oil Patch Collage Mural on the Sugar Plum Antiques Building, the American Flag Mural on the Drumright Fire Department Building, the Way Park Mural on the Boomtown Theatre Building, and the Drumright Street Scene of 1920 Mural on the Citizen's Insurance Agency Building. Additional murals are inside the Drumright Historical Museum.

The Drumright Historical Museum is housed in a 1915 Santa Fe Depot which is on the National Register of Historic Places, and has old railroad cars, but focuses on the unique history of the first great oil discovery in Oklahoma in 1912, leading to the Drumright Field producing more oil than any other in the world by 1917.

Whitlock Park features a splashpad, skateboard park, a stage for special events, pavilions, a playground for young kids, and walking paths.

Way Park features a gazebo for musical performances.

Dunbar Park has a gazebo for picnics.

Judy Shelton Burris Park has a Dog Park and a basketball court.

Garrett Park in Country Club Heights has a basketball court.

The Deborah Guillot Bright Nature Preserve is at the corner of E Oak and N Oklahoma.

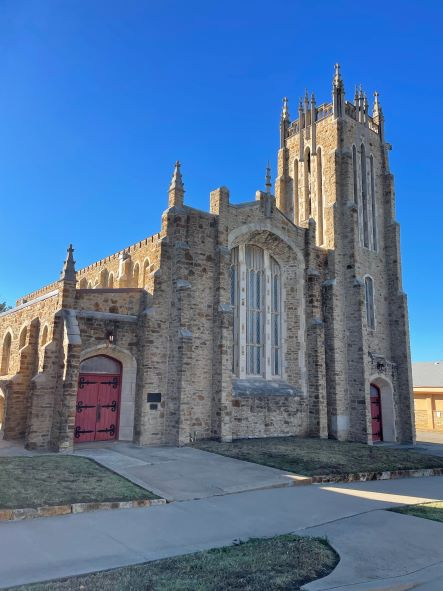
The First United Methodist Church

The following sites are NRHP-listed:

- Jackson Barnett No. 11 Oil Well
- Wheeler No. 1 Oil Well
- Drumright Gasoline Plant No. 2
- First United Methodist Church of Drumright
- Aaron Drumright House
- J.W. Fulkerson House
- Santa Fe Depot (now the Drumright Historical Museum)
- Tidal School
- Washington School

== See also ==
- Cushing-Drumright Oil Field
- Jackson Barnett No. 11 Oil Well
