= Drumright Oilers =

Drumwright Oilers
- 1921; (1920–1921, 1923); Drumright, Oklahoma

Minor league affiliations
- Class: Class D (1920–1921, 1923)
- League: Western Association (1920–1921); Oklahoma State League (1923)

Major league affiliations
- Team: None

Minor league titles
- League titles (0): None

Team data
- Name: Drumright Drummers (1920); Drumright Oilers (1921); Drumright Boosters (1923)
- Ballpark: Western Association Park (1921–1922)

The Drumright Oilers were a minor league baseball team based in Drumright, Oklahoma.

After a nearby Oil discovery in 1912 led to the creation of the city, Drumright teams played as members of the Class D level Western Association from 1920 to 1921. After the folding of the Western Association, Drumright became a member of the Class D level Oklahoma State League in 1923. Drumright played under a different nickname each season, known as the "Drummers" in 1920, "Oilers" in 1921 and "Boosters" in 1923.

Drumright hosted home minor league games at the Western Association Park, also known as the American Legion Field, which hosted Babe Ruth in an exhibition in 1922. The ballpark site is still in use today as the high school baseball field.

== History ==
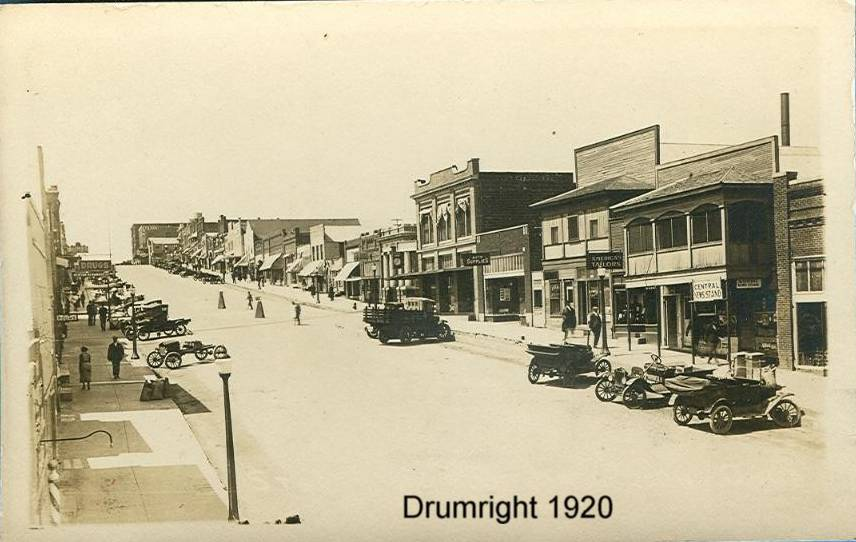
(1920) Drumright, Oklahoma. Oil was discovered near Drumright in 1912, leading to the Cushing-Drumright Oil Field and the creation of the city of Drumright.

The Drumright "Oilers" nickname corresponds to local industry and history, as the discovery of oil led to the creation of the city. In 1912, oil was discovered just one-mile north of today's Drumright city limits and drilling began on the Cushing-Drumright Oil Field. By 1919, the Cushing-Drumright Field production site was thirty-two square miles, with a peak of 3,090 total oil wells. The site was discovered by wildcatter Tom Slick, who struck oil on the farm of Frank Wheeler. The discovery of oil led to rapid growth in the yet to be named city of Drumright beginning immediately in 1912. A post office was quickly established on December 28, 1912. Local leaders James Fulkerson and Aaron Drumright platted the original city, which was initially called "Fulkerson." The town was then renamed for Aaron Drumright, whose farm was part of the town location. By the 1920 census, the newly formed city had over 6,000 residents. The Drumright Gasoline Plant No. 2 was listed on the National Register of Historic Places in 1982.

With the growth of the newly formed city, minor league baseball began in Drumright in 1920, when the Drumwright "Drummers" became members of the eight-team Western Association. The Western Association had just reformed after a two-year hiatus. The Chickasha Chicks, Enid Harvesters, Fort Smith Twins, Henryetta Hens, Okmulgee Drillers, Pawhuska Huskers and Springfield Merchants teams joined Drumwright in beginning league play on April 21, 1920.

On July 29, 1920, the visiting Chickasha Chicks defeated Drumright in 12-innings by the score of 9–6 to end a long Drumright Drummers winning streak.

In their first season of play, the Drumright Drummers placed fifth in the Western Association season with a 66–62 record, as the league held no playoffs. The Drummers were managed by Dick Crittenden and ended the season 19.0 games behind first place Okmulgee.

The team continued play in the 1921 Western Association, as the Drumright "Oilers." The Oilers finished in a distant last place in the eight-team Western Association league standings, playing the season under manager Kid Speer. The Oilers ended the season with an overall record of 44–105, placing eighth overall in the standings, finishing 43.0 games behind first place Springfield and 28.0 games behind seventh place Okmulgee. The Drumright franchise folded when the Western Association did not return to play in 1922.

After a one-season hiatus, Drumright returned to minor league play and joined the newly formed Oklahoma State League in 1923. The Oklahoma State League expanded from a six–team league to an eight-team league, adding Drumright and the Shawnee Indians teams. The Clinton Bulldogs, Duncan Oilers, El Reno Railroaders, Guthrie Linters and Wilson Drillers teams completed the 1923 league. After their one-year hiatus, the Drumright team became known by a new name, as the Duncan team was known as the "Oilers."

After beginning 1923 league play, the Drumright "Boosters" membership in the Oklahoma State League was brief as the team relocated during the season. On June 6, 1923, the Drumright Boosters franchise relocated to Ponca City, Oklahoma with an 11–21 record on that date. After compiling a record of 32–51 playing as the Ponca City Poncans, the team ended the regular season with an overall record of 43–72 record and were in last place. F.R. McGaha served as the manager, as the team placed eighth, finishing 21.0 games behind the first place Duncan Oilers.

There was not a Drumright team in the 1924 Oklahoma State League, as the Ponca City Poncans continued as a league member. Drumright has not hosted another minor league team.

== The ballpark ==
Drumwright hosted home minor league games at the Western Association Park, later known as the American Legion Field. The ballpark, which occupied the land where the Drumright High School baseball field now stands, was located at 601 South Layton Street.

In the fall of 1922, Babe Ruth and his New York Yankees teammate Bob Meusel went on a barnstorming tour. The tour had a stop at the ballpark in Drumright. On the tour, Ruth and Meusel played on opposing teams with local players and did hitting exhibitions.

== Timeline ==
Year(s)	# Yrs.	Team	Level	League	Ballpark
1920	1	Drumright Drummers	Class D	Western Association	Western Association Park
1921	1	Drumright Oilers	Class D	Western Association	Western Association Park
1923	1	Drumright Boosters	Class D	Oklahoma State League	Western Association Park

== Year–by–year records ==
Year	Record	Finish	Manager	Playoffs/Notes
1920	66–62	5th	Dick Crittenden	No playoffs held
1921	44–105	8th	Kid Speer	No playoffs held
1923	43–72	8th	F.R. McGaha	Drumright (11–21) moved to Ponca City June 6 Did not qualify

== Notable alumni ==
- Fuzzy Hufft (1921)
- Joe McDonald (1921)
- Kid Speer (1921, MGR)

== See also ==
- Drumright Oilers players
