= Cushing Refiners =

- 1921–1925; (1921, 1923–1925); Cushing, Oklahoma

Minor league affiliations
- Class: Class D (1921, 1923–1925)
- League: Southwestern League (1921); Oklahoma State League (1923–1924); Southwestern League (1925)

Minor league titles
- League titles (0): None

Team data
- Name: Cushing Oilers (1921); Cushing Refiners (1923–1925)
- Ballpark: Speedway Park (1921); Cushing Ball Park (1923–1925)

The Cushing Refiners were a minor league baseball teams based in Cushing, Oklahoma in 1921 and from 1923 to 1925. The "Refiners" played a members of the Class D level Oklahoma State League from 1923 to 1924 and Southwestern League in 1925. The Refiners were preceded in minor league play by the Cushing "Oilers, who played the season as members of the 1921 Southwestern League.

Cushing teams hosted minor league home games at Speedway Park in 1921 and the Cushing Ball Park from 1923 to 1925.

Baseball Hall of Fame member Carl Hubbell made his professional debut with the 1923 Cushing Refiners.

== History ==
Minor league baseball began in Cushing, Oklahoma during the 1921 season. On August 3, 1921, the Parsons Parsons team, members of the Class D level Southwestern League moved from Parsons, Kansas to Cushing.

Parsons was 26–57 at the time of the move. The team finished the 1921 season as the Cushing Oilers. The team compiled a record of 8–53 while based in Cushing and finished in last place in the eight-team league. The Parsons/Cushing teams placed eighth with an overall record of 34-110, playing the season under managers by G. C. "Kitty" Knight and Lefty Wilson. In 1922, the Southwestern League became a Class C level league and continued play without the Cushing franchise, which did not return to the league.

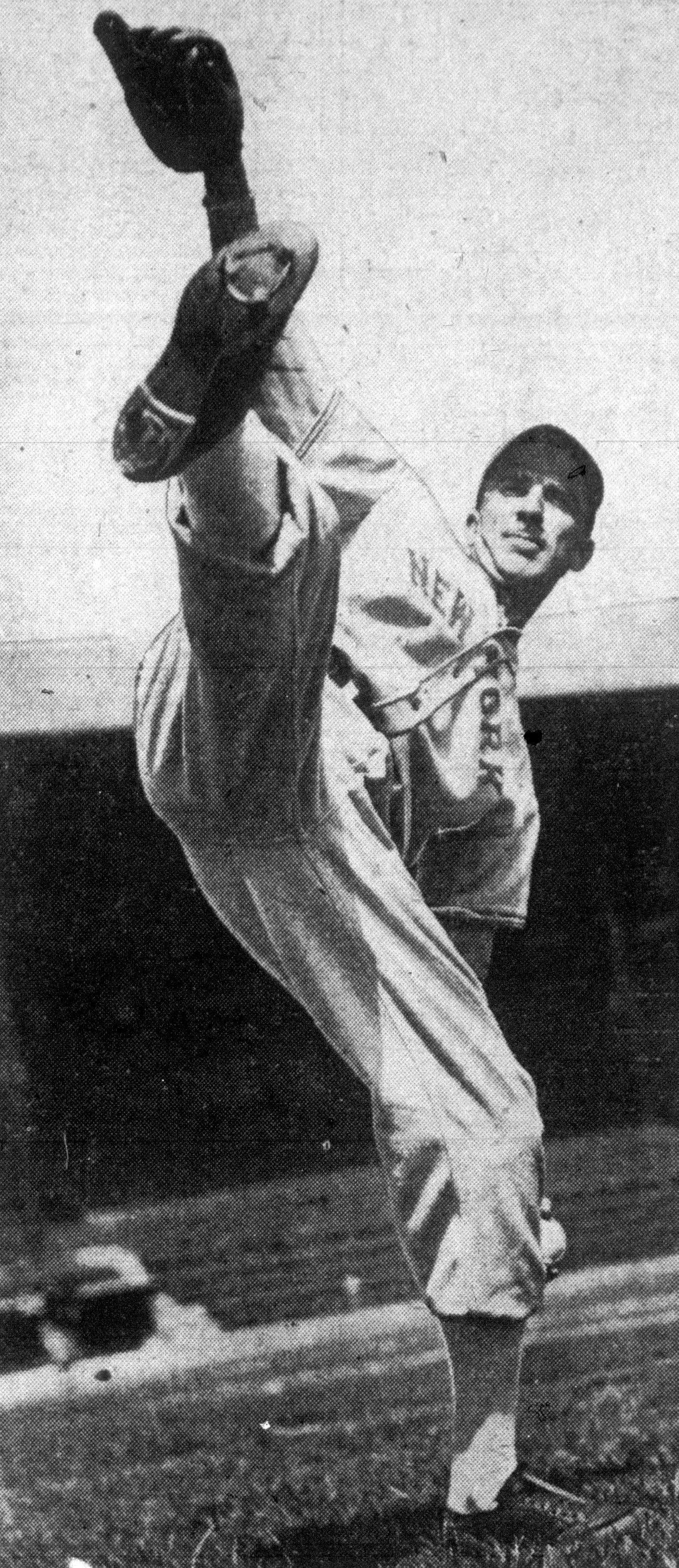
(1943) Carl Hubbell, New York Giants. Hall of Fame pitcher Carl Hubbell made his professional debut with Cushing in 1923.

The Cushing "Refiners" joined the Oklahoma State League for the 1923 season, as the league expanded from a six team league to an eight team league . The Refiners joined the Bristow Producers, Clinton Bulldogs, Drumright Boosters, Duncan Oilers, El Reno Railroaders, Guthrie Linters and Shawnee Indians teams in beginning league play on May 20, 1923.

The Refiners ended 1923 the season in second place in the eight–team league, with a future hall of fame player on their roster. Cushing ended the season with a 67–53 record, finishing 2.0 games behind the first place Duncan Oilers. The Refiners were managed by Ned Pettigrew in their runner-up regular season. The league played a split season schedule, and Cushing did not qualify for the final won by Bristow, who swept Duncan in four games.

In 1923, Baseball Hall of Fame inductee Carl Hubbell made his professional debut for the Cushing Refiners. Pettigrew had given Hubbell a tryout and subsequently signed him to a contract to play for Cushing. Hubbell was age 20 in 1923 and had worked for an oil company after graduating from high school in Meeker, Oklahoma.

In 1924, the Oklahoma State League folded during the season. The league permanently folded on July 8, 1924, with the Cushing Refiners in third place. Cushing ended the shortened season with a record of 49–27 when the league folded. The Refiners were again managed by Ned Pettigrew.

After the Oklahoma State folded, the Cushing Refiners rejoined the six–team Class D level Southwestern League for the 1925 season. The Oilers were 64–65 and placed fourth in the Southwestern League, finishing 9.5 games behind the first place Salina Millers in the final standings. The Refiners were managed by Frank Thompson.

The Cushing franchise was replaced by Ponca City Poncans in the 1926 Southwestern League. There has not been another minor league team in Cushing.

== The ballparks ==
The 1921 Cushing Oilers were noted to have played home games at Speedway Park. The ballpark was reportedly located north of town on North Little Avenue, where a bowling alley currently stands.

Starting in 1923, the Cushing Refiners reportedly played home games at a new facility called Cushing Ball Park. That ballpark was noted to have been located on West Moses Street on the southeast corner of the railroad crossing for the now-abandoned Missouri-Kansas-Texas Railroad tracks, which intersected West Moses between Violet and Puckett Avenues.

== Timeline ==
| Year(s) | # Yrs. | Team | Level | League | Ballpark |
|---|---|---|---|---|---|
| 1921 | 1 | Cushing Oilers | Class D | Southwestern League | Speedway Park |
| 1923–1924 | 2 | Cushing Refiners | Class D | Oklahoma State League | Cushing Ball Park |
| 1925 | 1 | Cushing Refiners | Class D | Southwestern League | Cushing Ball Park |

== Season-by-season ==
| Year | Record | Manager | Finish | Playoffs/Notes |
|---|---|---|---|---|
| 1921 | 34–110 | G.C. Knight/Lefty Wilson | 8th | Parsons (26–57) moved to Cushing Aug 3 |
| 1923 | 65–53 | Ned Pettigrew | 2nd | Did not qualify |
| 1924 | 49–27 | Ned Pettigrew | 3rd | League disbanded July 8 |
| 1925 | 64–65 | Frank Thompson | 4th | No playoffs held |

== Notable alumni ==
- Carl Hubbell (1923) Inducted Baseball Hall of Fame, 1947
- Elon Hogsett (1925)
- Ned Pettigrew (1923–1924, MGR)
- Oscar Roettger (1921)
- Andy Rush (1921)
- Frank Thompson (1925, MGR)
- Cushing Refiners players
- Cushing Oilers players
