= Henryetta Hens =

- 1920–1923; (1914, 1920–1923); Henryetta, Oklahoma

Minor league affiliations
- Class: Class D (1914, 1920–1923)
- League: Western Association (1914, 1920–1923)

Major league affiliations
- Team: None

Minor league titles
- League titles (0): None
- Conference titles (0): None

Team data
- Name: Henryetta Boosters (1914); Henryetta Hens (1920–1923)
- Ballpark: Booster Park (1914, 1920–1923)

The Henryetta Hens were a minor league baseball team based in Henryetta, Oklahoma.

The Henryetta "Hens" teams played as members of Class D level Western Association from 1920 to 1923. The Hens were preceded by the Henryetta "Boosters, " who played briefly in the 1914 Western Association.

The Henryetta "Hens" nickname was also used by the local Henryetta High School.

== History ==
Henryetta first hosted minor league baseball in 1914, when the Henryetta "Boosters" began play during the season. On July 10, 1914, the Joplin-Webb City Miners of the Class D level Western Association moved to Guthrie, Oklahoma with a record of 22–46 playing in the six-team league. After the Guthrie Senators had compiled a record of 2–10 based in that city, the franchise moved to Henryetta on July 22, 1914, and finished the remainder of the Western Association season playing as the Henryetta "Boosters." After compiling a record of 11–36 while based in Henryetta, the team ended the season in last place with an overall record of 35–92, to finish 41.0 games behind the first place Tulsa Oilers. Claude Marcum served as manager in all three locations.

Future major league player Don Flinn was traded from the first place Tulsa Oilers to the last place Henryette Boosters after leaving Tulsa in mid-August, claiming that his mother was ill. Between the two teams, Flinn hit .339 with 42 stolen bases.

In 1914, Henryetta finished behind the Tulsa Oilers (74–49), Oklahoma City Boosters (75–52 first half winner), Fort Smith Twins (73–52), Muskogee Mets (74–54 second half winner) and the McAlester Miners (47–79) in the final regular season standings of the six-team Western Association. Henryetta did not qualify for the playoff, won by Oklahoma City over Muskogee. The Henryetta Boosters did not return to the 1915 Western Association, as the league expanded to eight teams.

After a five-year hiatus, minor league baseball returned to Henryetta in 1920, when the Henryetta "Hens" became members of the eight-team Western Association. The Western Association was reformed after folding following the 1917 season. The Chickasha Chicks, Drumright Boosters, Enid Harvesters, Fort Smith Twins, Okmulgee Drillers, Pawhuska Huskers and Springfield Merchants teams joined Henryetta in beginning league play on April 21, 1920.

The Henryetta "Hens" nickname was also the nickname of the Henryetta High School sports teams through 1989, when it was changed to the "Knights."

In their first season of play, the Henryetta Hens placed fifth in the Western Association season with a 66–62 record, as the league held no playoffs. The Hens were managed by Emmett Rose and ended the season 7.0 games behind first place Okmulgee. Henryetta did not qualify for the playoff as Okmulgree was the first half winner and Enid was the second half winner in the split-season schedule and their playoff ended in a tie after six games. George Gray of Henryetta led the Western Association pitchers with both 26 wins and 193 strikeouts on the season.

The Hens continued play in the 1921 Western Association and finished in a distant last place in the eight-team Western Association league standings, playing the season under manager Steve O'Rourke. The Hens ended the season with an overall record of 44–105, placing eighth overall in the standings, finishing 7.0 games behind first place Springfield. The Hens did not qualify for the playoff as the Fort Smith Twins were the second half winner of the split season scheduled and lost in the final to the Chickasha Chicks, who were the first half winner. Pitcher Grady Adkins of Henryetta, who went on to pitch in the major leagues, had 26 wins to lead the Western Association.

In a September 1921 game at the Fort Smith Twins' Andrew's Field, the two teams had an extra inning game. There were no dugouts at Andrew's Field and after the Fort Smith Twins won the 3–2 game in the 10th inning, fans in the grandstand proceeded to throw things at the Henryetta Hens players. Players were hit with glass bottles. Local newspapers encouraged better fan behavior following the incident

The Hens placed third in 1922 Western Association regular season standings, With a record of 74–56, Henryetta finished 27.0 games behind the first place Enid Harvesters, as Leslie Hayes served as the Hens' manager. Henryetta did not advance to the playoff after the split season schedule, as the Enid Harvesters (104–27 overall) were the second half winner) and the Joplin Miners (93–42) were the first half winner. Joplin won the league title in the playoff.

Former major league pitcher Rube Foster played second base for Henryetta in 1922 before being traded to the Springfield Midgets in July, where he became the Springfield player/manager. Foster had retired after a career a pitcher after playing for the Boston Red Sox in 1917, where he was 8–7 with a 2.53 ERA. Foster then returned to baseball and embarked on a tenure of playing and managing in the minor leagues. Foster hit .331 for Henryetta in 77 games before the trade to Springfield.

In their final season of play, the 1923 Henryetta Hens team folded during the 1923 Western Association season. On July 21, 1923, after compiling a record of 43–38, the Hens franchise folded. The returning Leslie Hayes and Lou Jones managed the Hens in their partial season.

The Henryetta franchise did not rejoin the 1924 Western Association. Henryetta has not hosted another minor league team.

== The ballpark ==
The name of the Henryetta home ballpark was Booster Park. Local press accounts report that Henryetta constructed a new grandstand for its Western Association team at the beginning of the 1920 season, which was erected in the northwest corner of an existing park with batters hitting toward a neighboring creek. Historical accounts report that early day Henryetta citizens could enjoy a park that had been created on land near present-day Cameron Field. Cameron Field, where Henryetta's high school team still plays, is located adjacent to Coal Creek, which flows through the town. The exact location of the original city park was about a block south of Cameron Field. A 1920 map shows a tract of land reserved for a park in this area, which is surrounded by a bend in Coal Creek. The ballpark was described as being located on the east side of the railroad tracks, which further aligns with the location of the park tract. The Henryetta park was closed once the Civilian Conservation Corps completed work on Henryetta's Nichols Park, which was constructed between 1938 and 1940.

== Timeline ==
Year(s)	# Yrs.	Team	Level	League	Ballpark
1914	1	Henryetta Boosters	Class D	Western Association	Booster Park
1920–1923	1	Henryetta Hens	Class D	Western Association	Booster Park

== Year–by–year records ==
Year	Record	Finish	Manager	Playoffs/Notes
1914	35–92	9th	Claude Marcum	Joplin-Webb City (22–46) moved to Guthrie July 10; Guthrie (2–10) moved to Henryetta July 22; 11–36 in Henryetta
1920	75–56	4th	Emmett Rose	Did not qualify
1921	77–66	3rd	Steve O'Rourke	Did not qualify
1922	74–56	3rd	Leslie Hayes	Did not qualify
1923	43–38	NA	Leslie Hayes / Lou Jones	Team folded July 21

== Notable alumni ==
- Grady Adkins (1920–1922)
- Bernie DeViveiros (1921)
- Don Flinn (1914)
- Rube Foster (1922)
- Red Thomas (1920–1922)
- Frank Thompson (1914)

== See also ==
- Henryetta Boosters players
- Henryetta Hens players
