= Shawnee (disambiguation) =

The Shawnee are a Native American people.

Shawnee may also refer to:

== Places in the United States ==
- Shawnee, Colorado, an unincorporated community
- Shawnee, Georgia, an unincorporated community
- Shawnee, Kansas, a city in Johnson County
- Shawnee County, Kansas
- Shawnee, Louisville, Kentucky, a neighborhood
- Shawnee, Missouri, an unincorporated community
- Shawnee, Hamilton County, Ohio, a census-designated place
- Shawnee, Perry County, Ohio, a village
- Shawnee, Oklahoma, a city
- Shawnee, Angelina County, Texas, a ghost town
- Shawnee, Wyoming, an unincorporated community
- Shawnee Cave, Spring Mill State Park, Indiana
- Shawnee Creek (Apple Creek), a stream in Missouri
- Shawnee Creek (Baileys Creek), a stream in Missouri
- Shawnee Falls, one of 24 named waterfalls in Ricketts Glen State Park in Pennsylvania
- Lake Shawnee (New Jersey), a private lake
- Shawnee National Forest, Illinois
- Shawnee Park, Louisville, Kentucky
- Shawnee State Park (Ohio)
- Shawnee State Park (Pennsylvania)
- Shawnee Peak (Colorado)
- Shawnee Run, a stream in West Virginia
- Shawnee Township (disambiguation)

== American businesses ==
- Shawnee Fossil Plant, a coal-fired power plant near Paducah, Kentucky
- Shawnee Hotel, Springfield, Ohio, on the National Register of Historic Places
- Shawnee Mower Factor, original name of the defunct Worthington Mower Company
- Shawnee Pottery, a pottery manufacturer from 1937 to 1961
- Shawnee Press, a former music publisher

== People ==
- Shawnee Kish, Canadian Mohawk singer-songwriter
- Shawnee Smith (born 1969), American actress

== Schools ==
- Shawnee State University, Portsmouth, Ohio, United States
- Shawnee Community College, Ullin, Illinois
- Shawnee High School (disambiguation)

== Sports ==
- Shawnee Blues, a former minor league baseball team based in Shawnee, Oklahoma
- Shawnee Hawks, a former minor league baseball team based in Shawnee, Oklahoma
- Shawnee Indians (baseball), a former minor league baseball team based in Shawnee, Oklahoma
- Shawnee Open, a golf tournament, formerly a PGA tournament
- Shawnee Mountain Ski Area, Stroudsburg, Pennsylvania
- Shawnee Peak Ski Area, Bridgton, Maine
- Shawnee Stakes, a Grade III American Thoroughbred horse race for fillies and mares

== Transportation ==
- Shawnee (Amtrak train), an Amtrak train
- Shawnee (IC train), an Illinois Central train
- Shawnee Field, an airport in Bloomfield, Indiana
- Shawnee Regional Airport, near Shawnee, Oklahoma
- Piasecki H-21/CH-21 Shawnee helicopter
- SS Shawnee, a 1927 passenger steamship
- Shawnee Expressway (Kentucky)
- Shawnee Parkway, a proposed highway in West Virginia

== Other uses ==
- Shawnee language, spoken by the Native American tribe
- USS Shawnee, a monitor constructed during the American Civil War
- Shawnee Correctional Center, Vienna, Illinois, a medium-security state prison for men
- Shawnee Lodge, a Boy Scout lodge in the Greater St. Louis Area Council area

== See also ==
- Shawnee Group, a geologic group in Iowa
- Shawnee Hills (disambiguation)
- Shawnee Trail (disambiguation)
- Shawnee Mission, Kansas, a region
- Shawnee on Delaware, Pennsylvania, United States, an unincorporated community
- Fort Shawnee, Ohio, United States, a census-designated place
