= Anadarko Indians =

- 1912; Anadarko, Oklahoma

Minor league affiliations
- League: Oklahoma State League (1912)

Major league affiliations
- Team: None

Minor league titles
- League titles (0): None

Team data
- Name: Anadarko Indians (1912)
- Ballpark: Unknown (1912)

The Anadarko Indians were a minor league baseball team based in Anadarko, Oklahoma for one shortened season. In 1912, the Indians played briefly as members of the Class D level Oklahoma State League before permanently folding during the season. Jim Thorpe had a tryout stint for the Indians and was released, leading him to resume football.

== History ==
In 1912, Anadarko became new members of the Class D level Oklahoma State League, beginning league play in the eight–team league. The Guthrie Spas, Holdenville Hitters, McAlester Miners, Muskogee Indians, Oklahoma City Senators, Okmulgee Glassblowers and Tulsa Terriers teams joined Anadarko to begin the 1912 season.

The Anadarko use of the "Indians" moniker ties to local history. Today, Anadarko is home to the National Hall of Fame for Famous American Indians, where a sculpture of Jim Thorpe is included in the outdoor walkway of the Hall. Jim Thorpe had tried out for the Andarko Indians as a pitcher, but was released. Thorpe subsequently ran into Carlisle Indian Industrial School classmate and Andarko native Albert Exendine on the street in Andarko, Oklahoma. After a talk, Exendine convinced Thorpe to return to Carlisle to attend school and play football.

The Oklahoma State League began play on April 30, 1912. On June 21, 1912, both the Anadarko Indians and Oklahoma City Senators teams disbanded. Anadarko had a 24–23 record when the team folded. After the two teams folded the league continued play. A second Oklahoma State League schedule was created with replacement clubs placed in Enid, Oklahoma and Eufaula, Oklahoma. Anadarko was relocated to Enid and Oklahoma City to Eufala. The new schedule started and the new Enid team had compiled a 1–4 record when the Oklahoma State League officially disbanded on July 1, 1912.

The standings when the league folded had Anadarko in third place, playing under managers Roy Ellison, Thomas Reed and Ted Price. The final standings were led by Okmulgee Glassblowers (38–10), followed by the Tulsa Terriers (33–15), Anadarko Indians (24–23), Holdenville Hitters (21–23), McAlester Miners (21–25), McAlester Miners (21–25), Guthrie (15–33) and Oklahoma City Senators (15–33). The Eufaula team was 2–2 and Enid 1–4 under manager Ted Price.

Hi Jasper played for the 1912 Anadarko, Indians.

Anadarko, Oklahoma has not hosted another minor league team.

== The ballpark ==
The name of the 1912 Anadarko home ballpark is not directly referenced, but it was located at what was then known as Sixth Street just north of North Boundary Avenue. By 1916, the street formerly known as North Boundary Avenue had been renamed Kansas Avenue. By 1941, Anadarko's north-south numbered streets had been renumbered, causing Sixth Street to become First Street. Historic aerial photos show that a football field subsequently occupied the same general area. Construction on the new facility on that site, known as Anadarko Stadium, began in 1936. The stadium hosted high school football games through 1979, but was abandoned after a brief attempt to convert it to a greyhound racing track. The site today, which is now known as First Street north of Kansas Avenue, contains no traces of the either the former ballpark or the football stadium.

== Year-by-year record ==
Year	Record	Place	Manager	Playoffs/notes
1912	24–23	3rd	Roy Ellison; Thomas Reed / Ted Price	Team folded June 21; Moved to Enid (1–4); League folded July 1

== Notable alumni ==
- Hi Jasper (1912)
- Jim Thorpe* (1912)
- Complete roster information for the 1912 Anadarko team is not referenced.
