= Okmulgee Glassblowers =

- 1912; Okmulgee, Oklahoma

Minor league affiliations
- League: Oklahoma State League (1912)

Major league affiliations
- Team: None

Minor league titles
- League titles (1): 1912

Team data
- Name: Okmulgee Glassblowers (1912)
- Ballpark: Thomas Park/West End Grounds (1912)

The Okmulgee Glassblowers were a minor league baseball team based in Okmulgee, Oklahoma and Okmulgee County, Oklahoma for one shortened championship season. In 1912, the Glassblowers played as members of the Class D level Oklahoma State League, winning the league championship as the league folded during the season. Okmulgee hosted home minor league games at the Thomas Park West End Grounds, located on West Sixth Street.

== History ==
In 1910, Okmulgee first hosted minor league baseball for three games. On July 22, 1910, the Muskogee Navigators of the Class D level Western Association moved to Okmulgee with a record of 36–60. The team had compiled a record of 0-3 based in Okmulgee when the league disbanded on July 24, 1910.

In 1912, in their only season of minor league play, the Okmulgee "Glassblowers" became charter members of the eight-team Class D level Oklahoma State League. The Anadarko Indians, Guthrie Spas, Holdenville Hitters, McAlester Miners, Muskogee Indians, Oklahoma City Senators and Tulsa Terriers teams joined Okmulgee in beginning league play on April 30, 1912.

The Okmulgee use of the "Glassblowers" nickname corresponds to local industry in the era. The Baker Brothers and Graham Glass Company were both located in Okmulgee. The glass industry continues in Okmulgee today.

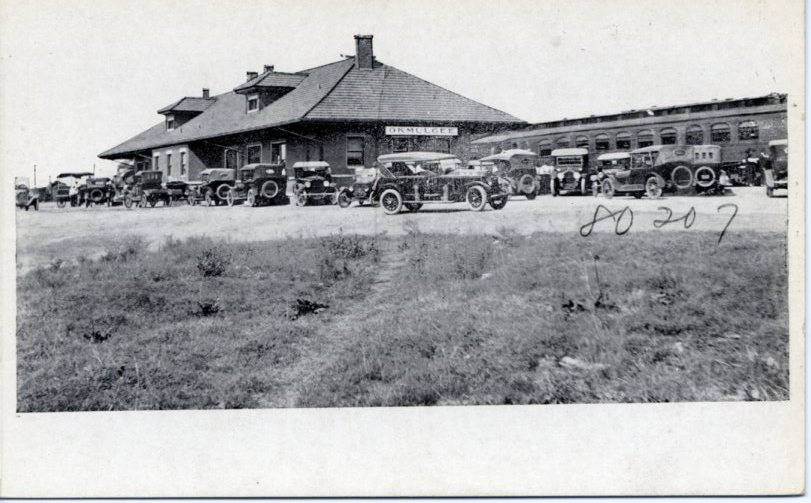
(1919) Train station. Okmulgee, Oklahoma

The 1912 Oklahoma State League lost two teams early in its first season, when both the Anadarko Indians and Oklahoma City Senators teams disbanded. After the two teams folded the league continued play and reorganized. A second Oklahoma State League schedule was created after Anadarko was relocated to Enid, Oklahoma and Oklahoma City to Eufaula, Oklahoma. The new schedule started, but shortly after, the Oklahoma State League officially disbanded on July 1, 1912.

The overall standings when the league folded had Okmulgee in first place, winning the league championship while playing under manager Frank Gardner. The final standings were led by Okmulgee, who had a record of 37–9. The Glassblowers were followed by the Tulsa Terriers (33–15), Anadarko Indians (24–23), Holdenville Hitters (21–23), McAlester Miners (21–25), Guthrie (15–33) and Oklahoma City Senators (15–33) in the final standings. The Eufaula team was 2–2 and Enid 1–4 in their brief period of play.

The Oklahoma State League reformed in 1922, without an Okmulgee franchise. The Okmulgee Drillers had begun play in 1920 as members of the Western Association, beginning in Class D and advancing to Class C in 1922.

== The ballpark ==
The Okmulgee Glassblowers hosted minor league games at a ballpark located on West Sixth Street. The ballpark is depicted on a 1916 fire insurance map, which shows a small grandstand on the south side of West Sixth just west of the railroad tracks, along with bleachers, two dougouts, and a fence surrounding the grounds. A machine shop building interrupts the fence on the first base side, creating an asymmetrical configuration. Newspaper accounts of 1915 semipro games confirm that this was the same ballpark used during 1912 Oklahoma State League action. Game notices referred to the ballpark as Thomas Park, West End Grounds.

Several modifications were made to the ballpark in 1915, including expansion of the grandstand, additional bleacher seating, and erection of a fence surrounding the ballpark. It is unknown whether the machine shop building depicted along the first base line in the 1916 map existed when the Glassblowers played there in 1912.

By 1920, the oil well supply company housed in a building along the tracks to the east of the grandstand had taken over the land formerly occupied by the ballpark, building a large warehouse where the machine shop formerly stood on the first base side and erecting a new and larger machine shop on the third base side. A new set of tracks for a different railroad also ran through what was formerly the outfield. When minor league baseball returned to Okmulgee in 1920, therefore, the team had to find a different home.

== Year-by-year record ==
Year	Record	Place	Manager	Playoffs/notes
1912	37–9	1st	Frank Gardner	League folded July 1 League champions

== Notable alumni ==
- Complete roster information for the 1912 Okmulgee team is not referenced.

A photo of the team shows members to include: Matticks; Upton; Pierce; Roberts; Jeffries; Everdon; Gardiner (Manager); Burnett; Clayton; Taylor; Clark; Harris; Ash; Baxter; "Bill" Mascot.
