= Holdenville Hitters =

- 1912; Holdenville, Oklahoma

Minor league affiliations
- League: Oklahoma State League (1912)

Major league affiliations
- Team: None

Minor league titles
- League titles (0): None

Team data
- Name: Holdenville Hitters (1912)
- Ballpark: Unknown (1912)

The Holdenville Hitters were a minor league baseball team based in Holdenville, Oklahoma. In 1912, the Hitters played as members of the Class D level Oklahoma State League before permanently folding during the season.

== History ==
In 1912, Holdenville, Oklahoma first hosted minor league baseball, as the Holdenville "Hitters" became members of the Class D level Oklahoma State League, beginning league play in the eight–team league. The Anadarko Indians, Guthrie Spas, McAlester Miners, Muskogee Indians, Oklahoma City Senators, Okmulgee Glassblowers and Tulsa Terriers teams joined the Holdenville to begin the 1912 season.

The Holdenville Hitters began Oklahoma State League play on April 30, 1912. On June 21, 1912, both the Anadarko Indians and Oklahoma City Senators teams disbanded from the league. After the two teams folded the league continued play, a second Oklahoma State League schedule was created with replacement clubs placed in Enid, Oklahoma and Eufaula, Oklahoma, but the league folded shortly after restructuring.

The Oklahoma State League folded on July 1, 1912. The standings when the league folded saw Holdenville finish in fourth place. The Hitters had a final record of 21–23, playing the season under managers Al Vorhees, Jim Bouldin and Johnny Hendley. The final standings were led by Okmulgee Glassblowers (38–10) followed by the Tulsa Terriers (33–15), Anadarko Indians (24–23), Holdenville Hitters (21–23), McAlester Miners (21–25), Guthrie (15–33) and Oklahoma City Senators (15–33). The Eufaula team was 2–2 and Enid 1–4 in their brief period of play. The Oklahoma State did not return to play in 1913.

Holdenville, Oklahoma has not hosted another minor league team.

== The ballpark ==
The name of the home ballpark for the 1912 Holdenville Hitters is unknown, but the location is reported to have been a short distance from the center of the city. Although sources have erroneously claimed that the team played at Stroup Park, that facility did not exist before 1932, when land for the park was donated to the City of Holdenville by Dr. and Mrs. W. A. Stroup.

== Year–by–year record ==
Year	Record	Place	Manager	Playoffs/notes
1912	21–23	4th	Al Vorhees / Jim Bouldin / Johnny Hendley	League disbanded July 1

== Notable alumni ==
- The roster for the 1912 Holdenville Hitters is unknown.
