= Clinton Bulldogs =

- 1922–1923; Clinton, Oklahoma

Minor league affiliations
- Class: Class D (1922–1923)
- League: Oklahoma State League (1922–1923)

Major league affiliations
- Team: None

Minor league titles
- League titles (0): None
- Conference titles (1): 1922

Team data
- Name: Clinton Bulldogs (1922–1923)
- Ballpark: Clinton Baseball Park (1922–1923)

The Clinton Bulldogs were a minor league baseball team based in Clinton, Oklahoma. In 1922 and 1923, the Bulldogs played as members of the Class D level Oklahoma State League, winning a split-season pennant in 1922. The Bulldogs hosted minor league home games at the Clinton Baseball Park.

== History ==
Minor league baseball began in Clinton, Oklahoma in 1922, when the Clinton "Bulldogs" began play as members of the reformed six–team, Class D level Oklahoma State League. The Chickasha Chicks, Duncan Oilers, El Reno Railroaders, Guthrie Linters and Wilson Drillers teams joined the Bulldogs in beginning league play on May 20, 1922.

The "Oklahoma State League" had previously formed in the 1912 season as an eight-team Class D level league, without a Clinton franchise. The 1912 league folded during the season.

The Clinton use of the "Bulldogs" nickname corresponds to usage of the mascot in region in the era. In 1922, the local Clinton High School became a member of the newly named Southwestern Oklahoma Athletic Conference. At the same time, Southwestern State Teachers College, today's Southwestern Oklahoma State University, had adopted the Bulldog as its mascot.

In their first season of play, the Clinton Bulldogs ended the Oklahoma State League regular season in second place overall and won the second half pennant, as the league played a split-season schedule. Clinton ended the 1922 regular season with an overall record of 63–48, finishing 4.5 games behind the first place Duncan Oilers. With the league playing the split-season schedule, Duncan did not win either half-season, as Clinton and the third place Chickasha Chicks captured the two spilt-season titles and met in the playoff. Chickasha won the championship, as the Chicks defeated Clinton 4 games to 1 in the finals. Jim Lawrence managed Clinton in their first season.

Continuing Oklahoma State League play in 1923. Clinton Bulldogs played in what would become their final season, as the Oklahoma State expanded to eight member teams. On July 7, 1923, Clinton executed a triple play in a game against the Shawnee Indians. The play was turned by Bulldog players Hynes at SS and Cronin at 3B.

The Bulldogs ended the 1923 season with an overall record of 63–60, finishing 7.5 games behind the first place Duncan Oilers. Dennis Huber was the Clinton manager. With the league again playing a split-season schedule, Clinton did not qualify for the playoff as Duncan won the first-half title and the Bristow Producers won the second-half title. In the playoff, Bristow swept Duncan in four games to win the league championship.

In 1924, the Clinton franchise did not return to the eight–team Oklahoma State League, as the El Reno Railroads and Drumright Boosters teams also folded and the three teams were replaced by the Enid, Pawhuska Huskies and Wewoka-Holdenville teams in league play,The eight-team Oklahoma State League permanently folded on July 8, 1924.

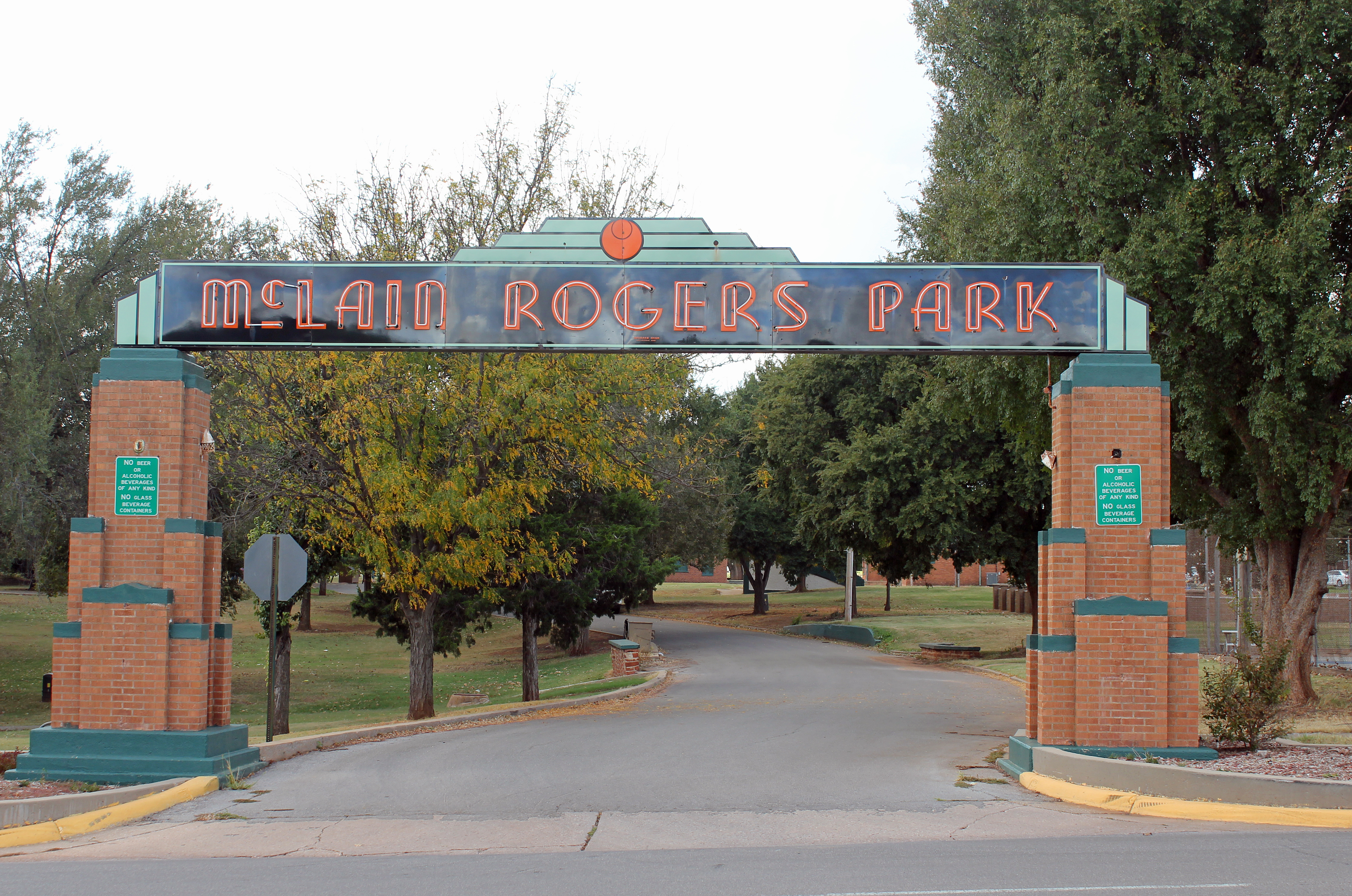
(2015) Entrance to McLain Rogers Park. Clinton, Oklahoma. National Register of Historic Places

== The ballpark ==
The Clinton Bulldogs teams hosted home minor league games at the Clinton baseball park. The ballpark was located on North Fourth Street.

== Timeline ==
Year(s)	# Yrs.	Team	Level	League	Ballpark
1922–1923	2	Clinton Bulldogs	Class D	Oklahoma State League	Clinton Base Ball Park

== Year–by–year records ==
Year	Record	Finish	Manager	Playoffs/Notes
1922	63–48	2nd	James Lawrence	Won second half pennant Lost in finals
1923	63–60	4th	Dennis Huber	Did not qualify

== Notable alumni ==
- Jim Lawrence (1922, MGR)
- The Clinton Bulldogs full player rosters are not referenced.
