= Bristow Producers =

- 1923–1924; Bristow, Oklahoma

Minor league affiliations
- League: Oklahoma State League (1923–1924)

Major league affiliations
- Team: None

Minor league titles
- League titles (1): 1923
- Conference titles (1): 1923

Team data
- Name: Bristow Producers (1923–1924)
- Ballpark: Bristow Base Ball Park/Klingensmith Park (1923–1924)

The Bristow Producers were a minor league baseball team based in Bristow, Oklahoma. In 1923 and 1924, the Producers hosted home games at the Bristow Base Ball Park and played exclusively as members of the Class D level Oklahoma State League, winning the 1923 Oklahoma State League pennant and championship.

== History ==
In 1923, Bristow, Oklahoma first hosted minor league baseball and won the league championship. Bristow became members of the reformed eight–team Class D level Oklahoma State League as the league expanded from six teams to eight. The Bristow Producers began Oklahoma State League play on May 20, 1923. The Clinton Bulldogs, Cushing Refiners, Drumright Boosters, Duncan Oilers, El Reno Railroaders, Guthrie Linters and Shawnee Indians joined the Producers in league play.

The Bristow Producers ended the 1923 Oklahoma State League season with a record of 66–56 to place third in the overall standings under managers James Payne and Ralph Heatley. As the league played a split–season schedule, Duncan won the first–half standings and Bristow won the second–half standings. In the playoff, the Bristow Producers swept the Duncan Oilers in four games to win the Oklahoma State League championship. The final overall regular season standings were led by Duncan Oilers (71–53), Clinton Bulldogs (63–60), Cushing Refiners (67–53), Guthrie (57–64), El Reno Railroaders (56–63), Shawnee Indians (54–60) and Drumright Boosters/Ponca City Poncans (46–71).

In their final season, the Bristow Producers placed second overall in the 1924 Oklahoma State League, as the league folded during the season. Although Bristow remained financially solid, the other 1924 league franchises were unstable after the league began play on April 24, 1924. Guthrie moved to McAlester on May 24, 1924, the Ardmore Bearcats moved to become the Pawhuska Huskies on June 8, 1924, on the same day McAlester moved to Wewoka-Holdenville, before the team eventually settled in Enid on July 6, 1924.

The Oklahoma State League permanently folded on July 8, 1924. Ardmore won the first half standings and Cushing was leading the second half standings when the league folded. Overall, the Bristow Producers finished with the second-best overall record in the league, with a record of 48–21. Bristow was managed again by Ralph Heatley. When the Oklahoma State League folded on July 8, 1924, Ardmore/Pawhuska had the best overall record (52–21), with Bristow 2.0 games behind. Bristow was followed by the Cushing Refiners (49–27), Shawnee Indians (40–37), Duncan Oilers (33–37), Ponca City Poncans (32–44), Blackwell Gassers (20–53) and Guthrie/McAlester/Wewoka-Holdenville/Enid (18–48).

Bristow, Oklahoma has not hosted another minor league team.

== The ballpark ==
The Bristow Producers hosted minor league home games at the Bristow Base Ball Park. The ballpark was located in Klingensmith Park, which is still in use today. The original Klingensmith Park covered five acres, but it has since been expanded to a 320–acre public park with baseball fields and other amenities. The amphitheater within the park is on the National Register of Historic Places. The modern Klingensmith Park is located at West 7th & Country Club Drive, in Bristow, Oklahoma.

== Timeline ==
| Year(s) | # Yrs. | Team | Level | League | Ballpark |
|---|---|---|---|---|---|
| 1923–1924 | 2 | Bristow Producers | Class D | Oklahoma State League | Bristow Baseball Park (Klingensmith Park) |

== Year–by–year records ==
| Year | Record | Place | Manager | Playoffs/notes |
|---|---|---|---|---|
| 1923 | 66–56 | 3rd | James Payne / Ralph Heatley | Second half champions League champions |
| 1924 | 48–21 | 2nd | Ralph Heatley | League disbanded July 8 |

== Notable alumni ==
- The Bristow Producers full player rosters are not referenced.
