= Chickasha Chicks =

- 1904–1922; (1904, 1920–1922); Chickasha, Oklahoma

Minor league affiliations
- Class: Class D (1904, 1920–1922)
- League: Southwestern League (1904); Western Association (1920–1921); Oklahoma State League (1922)

Major league affiliations
- Team: None

Minor league titles
- League titles (2): 1920; 1921

Team data
- Name: Chickasha Indians (1904); Chickasha Chicks (1920–1922)
- Ballpark: Rock Island Ball Park (1904); University Park (1920–1921); Grady Field (1921–1922)

The Chickasha Chicks were a minor league baseball team based in Chickasha, Oklahoma. Preceded by the short lived 1904 Chickasha Indians of the Class D level Southwestern League, the Chicks played as members of Western Association from 1920 to 1921 and Oklahoma State League in 1922, winning two league championships.

== History ==
Minor league baseball in Chickasha began when Chickasha briefly had a team in 1904. The Shawnee Browns of the Southwestern League moved to Chickasha, Oklahoma on June 30, 1904. The team became the Chickasha Indians and continued play in the Southwestern League. However, the franchise returned to Shawnee, Oklahoma on August 3, 1904. The franchise then disbanded on September 5, 1904. In Chickasha, the team had a record of 13-20 and folded with a 25-48 overall record, playing under managers William Hazlett, L.A. Lackey, Van Ness and Charles Palmer.

Baseball returned in 1920, when the Chickasha Chicks began play in the eight-team Western Association. The Western Association had just reformed after a two-year hiatus. The Drumright Drummers, Enid Harvesters, Fort Smith Twins, Henryetta Hens, Okmulgee Drillers, Pawhuska Huskers and Springfield Merchants teams joined the Chicks in beginning league play on April 21, 1920.

In their first full season of play, the Chickasha Chicks finished with a 52–72 record, placing seventh in the 1920 Western Association. The Chicks were managed by Ned Pettigrew and Drap Hayes.

The Chickasha Chicks won the 1921 Western Association Championship, playing under returning manager Drap Hayes. The Chicks ended the season with an overall record of 74–74, placing fifth overall in the regular season, but the team did capture the first–half pennant. In the playoff Finals, the Chickasha Chicks defeated the Fort Smith Twins four games to three to win the 1921 championship.

Chickasha left the Western Association to join the newly formed Oklahoma State League in 1922 and won their second straight championship. Other charter members of the six–team 1922 Oklahoma State League were the Clinton Bulldogs, Duncan Oilers, El Reno Railroaders, Guthrie, Oklahoma and Wilson Drillers teams.

Playing in their new league in 1922, the Chickasha Chicks finished third in the Oklahoma State League regular season standings with a 55–55 record. They qualified for the playoffs by winning the first–half championship with a 33–17 record. In the second half, however, low finances and low attendance during a losing streak caused the team to miss payroll and forfeit several games, culminating with a league takeover of the franchise. The team was renamed the "Orphans" and forced to play its remaining schedule on the road. Despite limited success over the remainder of the regular season, the team defeated the Clinton Bulldogs in the playoff finals, four games none, to win the 1922 championship. After the 1922 championship season the franchise folded.

Despite winning the 1922 championship, Chickasha did not return to play in the 1923 Oklahoma State League. The Chicks were succeeded by the 1948 Chickasha Chiefs, who began play as members of the Sooner State League.

== The ballparks ==
From 1920 through May 1921, the Chickasha Chicks played at University Park. University Park, which had previously hosted exhibition games featuring Hall of Fame pitcher Walter Johnson, was located at the terminus of the street railway line near present-day Shannon Springs Park.

In the middle of the 1921 season, the Chicks moved to a newly constructed ballpark named Grady Field. The new ballpark was located on East Choctaw Avenue, just east of the viaduct that carries that road over the railroad tracks, where the Grady County Fairgrounds are now located. University Park was demolished immediately upon completion of the new field.

The 1904 Chickasha Indians played at Rock Island Ball Park. This facility was built at the site of the former Rock Island stockyards, south of the Rock Island Railroad machine shop and the Crystal Ice Company plant, on land donated by the railroad. The location was half a block east of South First Street, along the railroad tracks between East Minnesota and East Dakota Avenues.

== Timeline ==
| Year(s) | # Yrs. | Team | Level | League | Ballpark |
|---|---|---|---|---|---|
| 1904 | 1 | Chickasha Indians | Class D | Southwestern League | Rock Island Ball Park |
| 1920–1921 | 2 | Chickasha Chicks | Class D | Western Association | University Park |
| 1922 | 1 | Chickasha Chicks | Class D | Oklahoma State League | Grady Field |

== Year–by–year Record ==
| Year | Record | Finish | Manager | Playoffs/Notes |
|---|---|---|---|---|
| 1904 | 25–42 | NA | William Hazlett / L.A. Lackey / Van Ness / Charles Palmer | Shawnee moved to Chickasha (13–20) June 30; Chickasha moved to Shawnee August 3 Team folded September 5 |
| 1920 | 52–72 | 7th | Ned Pettigrew / Drap Hayes | No playoffs held |
| 1921 | 74–74 | 6th | Drap Hayes | League champions |
| 1922 | 55–55 | 3rd | Jim Fitzgerald / Larry McLean | League champions |

== Notable alumni ==
- Mike Cvengros (1921)
- Ned Pettigrew (1920, MGR)
- Guy Sturdy (1921)
- Chickasha Chicks players
