= Oklahoma State League =

Minor baseball league based in Oklahoma

- Classification: Class D (1912, 1922–1924)
- Sport: Minor League Baseball
- First season: 1912
- Folded: 1924
- President: L.S. Dodds (1912); Leo Meyer(1912); C.E. Plott (1922); E.A. Daniels (1922–1924); A.L. Ragan (1924)
- No. of teams: 24
- Country: United States
- Most titles: 1 Okmulgee Glassblowers (1912); Chickasha Chicks (1922); Bristow Producers (1923); Pawhuska Huskies (1924)

The Oklahoma State League was a Class D level minor baseball league based in Oklahoma that existed in 1912 and again from 1922 to 1924. L.S. Dodds (1912), Leo Meyer (1912), C.E. Plott (1922), E.A. Daniels (1922–1924) and A.L. Ragan (1924) served as presidents of the league. Hall of Fame pitcher Carl Hubbell played in the league, making his professional debut with the 1923 Cushing Refiners.

== History ==
The league was represented by eight teams in 1912: the Anadarko Indians, Holdenville Hitters, McAlester Miners, Muskogee Indians, Oklahoma City Senators, Okmulgee Glassblowers, Tulsa Terriers and Guthrie Spas. The league disbanded on July 29, with the Glassblowers in first place and the Guthrie team in last.

Another incarnation of the league came about in 1922, represented by the Chickasha Chicks, Clinton Bulldogs, Duncan Oilers, El Reno Railroaders, Wilson Drillers and Guthrie Linters team. The Duncan Oilers finished first in the league regular season standings, with the Chickasha Chicks becoming the league champions, winning the league's playoff series.

In 1923, the league was represented by the Cushing Refiners, Bristow Producers, Duncan Oilers, Clinton Bulldogs, El Reno Railroaders, Shawnee Indians, Drumright Boosters/Ponca City Poncans and the Guthrie Linters. The Refiners finished in first in the regular season and Bristow won the league championship.

The league played its final season in 1924, represented by the Ardmore Bearcats/Pawhuska Huskies, Bristow Producers, Cushing Refiners, Shawnee Indians, Duncan Oilers, Ponca City Poncans, Blackwell Gassers and the McAlester Diggers, also based in Guthrie, Wewoka and Enid. The league disbanded on July 8, with Ardmore/Pawhuska in first and the Guthrie/McAlester/Wewoka/Enid Harvesters team in last place.

== Cities represented ==
- Anadarko, OK: Anadarko Indians (1912)
- Ardmore, OK: Ardmore Bearcats (1924)
- Blackwell, OK: Blackwell Gassers (1924)
- Bristow, OK: Bristow Producers (1923–1924)
- Chickasha, OK: Chickasha Chicks (1922)
- Clinton, OK: Clinton Bulldogs (1922–1923)
- Cushing, OK: Cushing Refiners (1923–1924)
- Drumright, OK: Drumright Boosters (1923)
- Duncan, OK: Duncan Oilers (1922-1924)
- El Reno, OK: El Reno Railroaders (1922–1923)
- Enid, OK: Enid (1924)
- Eufaula, OK: Eufaula (1912)
- Guthrie, OK: Guthrie Spas (1912); Guthrie Linters (1922–1924)
- Holdenville, OK: Holdenville Hitters (1912)
- McAlester, OK: McAlester Miners (1912); McAlester Diggers (1924)
- Muskogee, OK: Muskogee Indians (1912)
- Oklahoma City, OK: Oklahoma City Senators (1912)
- Okmulgee, OK: Okmulgee Glassblowers (1912)
- Pawhuska, OK: Pawhuska Huskies (1924)
- Ponca City, OK: Ponca City Poncans (1923–1924)
- Shawnee, OK: Shawnee Indians (1923–1924)
- Tulsa, OK: Tulsa Terriers (1912)
- Wewoka, OK & Holdenville, OK: Wewoka-Holdenville (1924)
- Wilson, OK: Wilson Drillers (1922)

== Standings & statistics ==
=== 1912 ===
1912 Oklahoma State League schedule

Team standings	W	L	PCT	GB	Managers
Okmulgee Glassblowers	37	9	.792	–	Frank Garner
Tulsa Terriers	33	15	.688	5.0	Howard Price
Anadarko Indians	24	23	.511	13.5	Roy Ellison / Thomas Reed / Ted Price
Holdenville Hitters	21	23	.477	15.0	Al Vorhees / James Bouldin / John Hendley
McAlester Miners	21	25	.457	16.0	Jerry Kane
Muskogee Indians	19	24	.442	16.5	Victor Kelly / Dick Speer
Oklahoma City Senators	15	33	.313	23.0	Bill Reukauff / Leo Langley
Guthrie Spas	15	33	.313	23.0	Chick Leutke
Enid	1	4	.200	NA	Ted Price
Eufaula	2	2	.500	NA	Joe Langley

League played a split–season schedule. Oklahoma City disbanded June 21. Andarko moved to Enid June 28; Oklahoma City moved to Eufaula June 28; Okmulgee folded June 29
The league officially disbanded July 2.

Player statistics
Player	Team	Stat	Tot	Player	Team	Stat	Tot
Wynn	Muskogee	BA	.430	Ben Tincup	Muskogee	SO	163

=== 1922 to 1924 ===
1922 Oklahoma State League schedule

Team standings	W	L	PCT	GB	Managers
Duncan Oilers	65	44	.596	–	John Fant
Clinton Bulldogs	64	46	.582	1.5	Jim Lawrence
Chickasha Chicks	55	55	.500	10.5	Jim Fitzgerald / Larry McLean
El Reno Railroaders	53	56	.486	12.0	Virgil Moss
Guthrie Linters	48	59	.449	16.0	Mike Balenti
Wilson Drillers	40	65	.381	23.0	Jim Payne / Jew Hellman

Chickasha became a road team in the second half.
Playoff: Chickasha 4 games, Clinton 0.

1923 Oklahoma State League schedule

Team standings	W	L	PCT	GB	Managers
Duncan Oilers	71	53	.573	–	Larry McLean
Cushing Refiners	67	53	.558	2.0	Ned Pettigrew
Bristow Producers	66	56	.541	4.0	Jim Payne / Ralph Heatley
Clinton Bulldogs	63	60	.512	7.5	Huber Dennis
Shawnee Indians	54	60	.474	12.0	Clyde Wren
El Reno Railroaders	56	63	.471	12.5	Harry Burge
Guthrie Linters	57	64	.471	12.5	Billy Williams
Drumright Boosters / Ponca City Poncans	46	71	.393	21.5	Frank McGaha / Carl Wiggins / J.E. Jones

Drumright (11–21) moved to Ponca City June 7.
Playoff: Bristow 4 games, Duncan 0.

1924 Oklahoma State League schedule

Team standings	W	L	PCT	GB	Managers
Ardmore Bearcats/ Pawhuska Huskies	52	21	.712	–	Drap Hayes
Bristow Producers	48	21	.696	2.0	Ralph Heatley
Cushing Refiners	49	27	.645	4.5	Ned Pettigrew
Shawnee Indians	40	37	.519	14.0	Larry McLean
Duncan Oilers	33	37	.471	17.5	John Fant
Ponca City Poncans	32	44	.421	21.5	Huber Dennis
Blackwell Gassers	20	53	.274	32.0	J. Rustenhaven / Hal Grun
Guthrie / McAlester / Wewoka-Holdenville / Enid	18	48	.272	30.5	M. Robertson / Ted Lipps

Guthrie (8–18) moved to McAlester May 24; Ardmore (30–13) moved to Pawhuska June 8; McAlester (3–13) moved to Wewoka-Holdenville June 8, Wewoka-Holdenville moved to Enid in late June; Duncan disbanded July 6.
The league disbanded July 8.
