= South Central League =

- Formerly: Missouri Valley League
- Classification: Class D (1906, 1912)
- Sport: Minor League Baseball
- First season: 1906
- Folded: 1912
- Replaced by: Oklahoma–Arkansas–Kansas League
- President: J.M. McAllister (1906); Orville Frantz (1906); P.D. Harper (1906); Dr. D.M. Shiveley (1912); Luther Ellison (1912); Bill Lattimore (1912)
- No. of teams: 13
- Country: United States of America
- Most titles: 1 McAlester Miners (1906); Longview Cannibals (1912)

The South Central League was a minor league baseball league that played in the 1906 and 1912 seasons, with franchises located in Arkansas, Oklahoma and Texas. The McAlester Miners (1906) and Longview Cannibals (1912) won league championships.

== History ==
The 1906 league consisted of teams from Arkansas and Oklahoma. The six–team league included the Fort Smith Razorbacks, the Guthrie Senators, the Muskogee Indians, the Shawnee Blues, the South McAlester Miners and the Tulsa Oilers. Guthrie and Shawnee disbanded on July 21, while the whole league disbanded in August. The Miners finished in first place. One notable player, Clyde Milan, spent time in the league.

== Cities represented ==
- Cleburne, TX: Cleburne Railroaders (1912)
- Fort Smith, AR: Fort Smith Razorbacks (1906)
- Guthrie, OK: Guthrie Senators (1906)
- Longview, TX: Longview Cannibals (1912)
- Marshall, TX: Marshall Athletics 1912
- Muskogee, OK: Muskogee Indians (1906)
- Paris, TX: Paris Boosters (1912)
- Shawnee, OK: Shawnee Blues (1906)
- Texarkana, TX: Texarkana Twins (1912)
- McAlester, OK: McAlester Miners (1906)
- Tulsa, OK: Tulsa Oilers (1906)
- Tyler, TX: Tyler Elbertas (1912)

== League standings and statistics ==
1906 South Central League schedule

Team standings	W	L	PCT	GB	Managers
McAlester Miners	59	32	.648	--	Jud Smith
Muskogee Indians	50	38	.568	7.5	J.W. Callahan / Muggsy Monroe
Ft. Smith Razorbacks	47	39	.547	9.5	Fernandez / Walt Ahern
Tulsa Oilers	45	42	.517	12.0	Cap Smith / Bill Rupp
Shawnee Blues	29	42	.408	NA	J.B. Roe / J.B. McAlester
Guthrie Senators	18	55	.247	NA	Dad Bennett / Jim Greer / J.W. Faulkner

Guthrie and Shawnee started the second half July 4, but disbanded July 21.
The league disbanded August 5.

1912 South Central League schedule

Team standings	W	L	PCT	GB	Managers
Longview Cannibals	63	51	.553	--	Tully Spear / Jim Gardiner
Marshall Athletics	56	58	.491	7.0	Harry Kane
Texarkana Twins	51	65	.440	13.0	Pat Woods / McLendon / Rudy Kling / Dee Poindexter
Paris Boosters	46	63	.422	14.5	Rick Adams / W.W. Hawker / Jack Jutze
Cleburne Railroaders	51	28	.646	NA	Dad Ritter
Tyler Elbertas	40	42	.488	NA	Dee Poindexter

Tyler and Cleburne disbanded July 17.
Playoff: Texarkana was declared champion as first half winner Cleburne disbanded.

Player statistics
Player	Team	Stat	Tot	Player	Team	Stat	Tot
Ray Nagle	Marshall	BA	.368	Hugh Harbin	Cleburne	W	15
Ray Nagle	Marshall	Runs	42	Bill Daniels	Cleburne/Paris	SO	123
Ray Nagle	Marshall	Hits	76	Lindy Hiett	Cleburne	Pct	.875; 7–1
