= Hi Jasper =

American baseball player (1886–1937)

- Pitcher
- Born: May 24, 1886; St. Louis, Missouri
- Died: May 24, 1937 (aged 50); St. Louis, Missouri
- Batted: Right Threw: Right

MLB debut
- April 19, 1914, for the Chicago White Sox

Last MLB appearance
- August 21, 1919, for the Cleveland Indians

MLB statistics
- Win–loss record: 10–12
- Earned run average: 3.48
- Strikeouts: 96
- Stats at Baseball Reference

Teams
- Chicago White Sox (1914–1915); St. Louis Cardinals (1916); Cleveland Indians (1919)

Henry "Hi" Jasper (May 24, 1886 – May 22, 1937) was a pitcher in Major League Baseball. He played for the Chicago White Sox, St. Louis Cardinals, and Cleveland Indians.

Jasper began his professional career in 1909 with the Jacksonville Braves of the Central Association. He had a .218 batting average in 114 games for the Braves. The following season, he played for the Dubuque Dubs of the Illinois–Indiana–Iowa League, and played in 61 games for them. In 1912, he spent the season with the Anadarko Indians of the Oklahoma State League. While with the Indians, Cincinnati Reds manager Hank O'Day brought him in for a trial to make the major league roster, which was unsuccessful. He returned to the Dubs as a pitcher in 1913, and had a win-loss record of 13-6 in 20 games.

Jasper joined the Chicago White Sox and made his major league debut on April 19, 1914. In 16 games for the White Sox, Jasper had a 1-0 record and a 3.34 earned run average (ERA). The following season, he pitched in three games for the White Sox, losing one and finishing the year with a 4.60 ERA. Early in the 1915 season he was sent to the Los Angeles Angels, but refused to report for the team; club president Johnny Powers said in response to his refusal that he would find it impossible to join a major league team.

In 1916, Jasper spent the season with the St. Louis Cardinals. In 21 games, he had a 5-6 record and a 3.28 ERA. Near the end of the season, he was sent to Los Angeles, but again refused to report; it was not until March the following year when he decided to join the team. After a stint with Los Angeles in 1917, he spent the next two seasons with the St. Paul Saints and the Milwaukee Brewers. Jasper's last stint in the major leagues was with the Cleveland Indians; in 12 games he had a 4-5 record and a 3.59 ERA.

Jasper died in 1937 after he fell off a truck driven by his employer in St. Louis, Missouri.
