= Shawnee Peak =

Shawnee Peak may refer to:

- Pleasant Mountain Ski Area, Maine, formerly known as Shawnee Peak Ski Area (1988–2022)
- Shawnee Peak (Alaska)
- Shawnee Peak (Colorado)
