= Ned Pettigrew =

American baseball player (1881-1952)

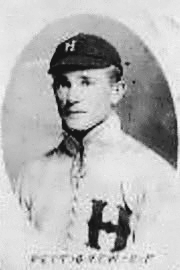
- Pettigrew with the Hutchinson Salt Packers in 1907
- Pinch hitter
- Born: August 25, 1881; Honey Grove, Texas, U.S.
- Died: August 25, 1952 (aged 71); Duncan, Oklahoma, U.S.
- Batted: Right Threw: Right

MLB debut
- April 23, 1914, for the Buffalo Buffeds

Last MLB appearance
- April 24, 1914, for the Buffalo Buffeds

MLB statistics
- Games played: 2
- At bats: 2
- Hits: 0
- Stats at Baseball Reference

Teams
- Buffalo Buffeds (1914)

Jim Ned Pettigrew (August 25, 1881 – August 20, 1952) was an American Major League Baseball player who pinch hit in two games for the Buffalo Buffeds in 1914. He was a Minor League Baseball outfielder from 1905 to 1921, and managed in the minors as well.

== Career ==
Pettigrew made his professional baseball debut in 1905, playing for the Guthrie Senators of the Western Association. He played for several teams in the Association until 1909, when he moved to the Topeka Jayhawks of the Western League.

An April 2, 1909 report noted that while playing as a center fielder for the Wichita Jobbers, Pettigrew was nearly struck by an automobile while in Wichita. He stated "I ran out of the hotel to catch a car and one of those jay drivers all but ran me down."

Pettigrew played for the Wichita Jobbers in 1910 and 1912, spending 1911 in the Northwestern League. In 1913, he played for the Chicago Keeleys of the Federal League. In April 1914, Pettigrew was purchased by the Buffalo Buffeds of the Federal League. He played in only two games for Buffalo, being used as a pinch hitter. He went hitless in two at bats. He returned to the minors for the remainder of his career, spending time with several teams. Both during and after his playing career, Pettigrew managed five minor league teams.

As manager of the Cushing Refiners in 1923, Pettigrew gave a tryout to 20 year old Carl Hubbell, who hadn't pitched since high school. Pettigrew signed Hubbell, who went on to a Baseball Hall of Fame career.
