= Marshall Athletics =

Baseball team in Texas, United States

The Marshall Athletics was a Class-D South Central League baseball team based in Marshall, Texas United States that played in 1912. They were managed by Harry Kane, who played four seasons in the major leagues. They finished second in the league, behind the Longview Cannibals, with a 56-58 record.

They were the first known professional baseball team to be based in Marshall, Texas.
