= Shawnee Blues =

The Shawnee Blues were a South Central League team based in Shawnee, Oklahoma, United States, that played during the 1906 season. They played their first game on May 1, at home against the Guthrie Senators under manager J.B. Roe. Roe was replaced by J.B. McAlester, who prior to his role as Shawnee Blues manager had been the president of the South Central League. The team performed poorly throughout the season, so much so that there were rumors it would be relocated to Enid, Oklahoma. That move never came to fruition. Overall, the team finished in fifth place out of six teams in their - and the league's - lone year of existence.

One player of note who spent time with the team is Clyde Milan. He spent 16 seasons in the major leagues.
