= Shawnee Indians (baseball) =

Oklahoma State League baseball team (1923-1924)

The Shawnee Indians were an Oklahoma State League baseball team based in Shawnee, Oklahoma, United States that played from 1923 to 1924. Major league baseball pitcher Walt Tauscher played for them. In 1923, they were managed by Clyde Wren, and in 1924 they were managed by Larry McLean.
