= Shawnee Township =

Shawnee Township may refer to the following places in the United States:

- Shawnee Township, Gallatin County, Illinois
- Shawnee Township, Fountain County, Indiana
- Shawnee Township, Cherokee County, Kansas
- Shawnee Township, Bates County, Missouri
- Shawnee Township, Cape Girardeau County, Missouri
- Shawnee Township, Henry County, Missouri
- Shawnee Township, Allen County, Ohio

== See also ==
- Shawnee (disambiguation)
