= Tyler Elbertas =

Defunct professional baseball team

The Tyler Elbertas was a South Central League baseball team based in Tyler, Texas, United States that played in 1912. They were the first known professional baseball team based in Tyler and until 1924, were the only team to ever come out of that city.

Cotton Tierney, who played in the major leagues from 1920 to 1926, played for the team.
