= Duncan Oilers =

- 1922–1924; Duncan, Oklahoma

Minor league affiliations
- Class: Class D (1922–1924)
- League: Oklahoma State League (1922–1924)

Major league affiliations
- Team: None

Minor league titles
- League titles (0): None
- Conference titles (2): 1922; 1923

Team data
- Name: Duncan Oilers (1922–1924)
- Ballpark: Duncan Baseball Park (1922–1924)

The Duncan Oilers were a minor league baseball team based in Duncan, Oklahoma. From 1922 to 1924, the Oilers played as members of the Class D level Oklahoma State League, winning two league pennants. Duncan hosted minor league home games at the Duncan Baseball Park.

== History ==
Minor league baseball began in Duncan, Oklahoma when the 1922 Duncan Oilers began play as members of the six–team, Class D level Oklahoma State League. The Chickasha Chicks, Clinton Bulldogs, El Reno Railroaders, Guthrie and Wilson Drillers teams joined Duncan in beginning league play on May 20, 1922.

The Duncan "Oilers" nickname corresponds to local industry. Duncan has a long history of oil production and in the era, Duncan was home to numerous oil related production companies. Specifically, the Rock Island Oil & Refining Company was established in Duncan in 1922, corresponding with the Oilers minor league team beginning play.

In their first season of play, the Duncan Oilers ended the Oklahoma State League season with the best overall regular season record. Duncan then missed qualifying for the league Finals, as the league played a split-season schedule. Duncan ended the 1922 regular season with a record of 67–43, finishing 4½ games ahead of the second place Clinton Bulldogs. With the league playing a split-season schedule, Duncan did not win either half-season, as Clinton and the Chickasha Chicks captured the two spilt-season titles and met in the Finals, where Chickasha won the championship.

In their second season of play, the 1923 Duncan Oilers again had the best record in the league, as the Oklahoma State expanded to eight teams. The Oilers ended the 1923 season with a record of 71–53, playing the season under manager Larry McLean. Duncan finished 2.0 games ahead of the second place Cushing Refiners in the final standings. With the league again playing a split-season schedule, Duncan won the first-half title and met the Bristow Producers in the Final, where Bristow swept Duncan in four games.

In their final season of play, the 1924 Duncan Oilers were in fifth place when the eight-team Oklahoma State League permanently folded following during the season. On July 8, 1924, the league "suspended operations." The Oilers had a 33-37 record when the league folded. Playing under returning manager John Fant, Duncan was 17½ games behind the first place Pawhuska Huskies when the league folded.

Duncan next hosted minor league baseball when the 1947 Duncan Cementers began play as members of the Class D level Sooner State League.

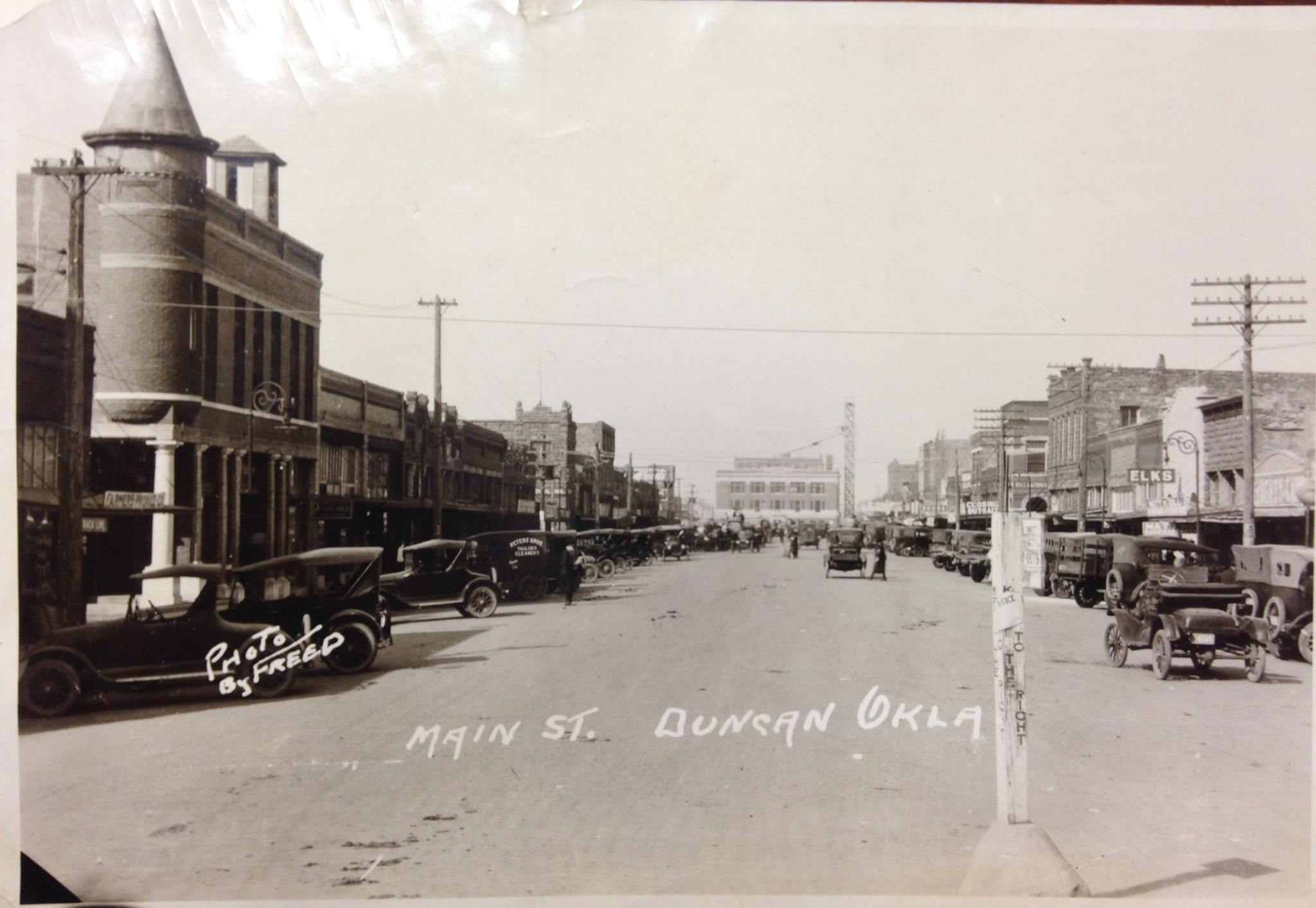
Duncan, Oklahoma. 1920s

== The ballpark ==
The Duncan Oilers hosted home minor league games at the Duncan Baseball Park, which was located in what was called City Park as of 1922. City Park was renamed Fuqua Park in 1923. Fuqua Park still exists, being located on Rice Drive to the northwest of downtown Duncan, but the ball fields that once hosted the Oilers and Duncan semipro teams have been removed.

== Timeline ==
Year(s)	# Yrs.	Team	Level	League	Ballpark
1922–1924	3	Duncan Oilers	Class D	Oklahoma State League	Duncan Base Ball Park

== Year–by–year records ==
Year	Record	Finish	Manager	Playoffs/Notes
1922	67–43	1st	John Fant	Did not qualify
1923	71–53	1st	Larry McLean	Lost in Final
1924	33–37	5th	John Fant	League folded July 8

== Notable alumni ==
- Larry McLean (1923, MGR)
- Bill Walker (1922)

== See also ==
- Duncan Oilers players
