= Shawnee Trail =

Shawnee Trail may refer to:

- Shawnee Trail (West Virginia), a portion of the larger Great Indian Warpath or Seneca Trail
- Texas Road, a pioneer cattle trail, once known as Shawnee Trail

Shawnee Trail was in use around the late 1840s, and traveled through the major cities such as; Lockhart, Dallas, Sedalia, and Kansas City.
