= Shawnee Hills (disambiguation) =

Shawnee Hills may refer to:

- Shawnee Hills, a geographical region of southern Illinois, United States
  - Shawnee Hills AVA, a wine appellation within the region
- Shawnee Hills, Delaware County, Ohio
- Shawnee Hills, Greene County, Ohio
