= Shawnee Peak (Colorado) =

Mountain in the American state of Colorado

- Location within Colorado

Highest point
- Elevation: 11,932 ft (3,637 m)
- Prominence: 307 ft (94 m)
- Isolation: 1.30 mi (2.09 km)
- Coordinates: 39°23′48″N 105°35′49″W

Geography
- Location: Park County, Colorado, U.S.
- Parent range: Kenosha Mountains
- Topo map(s): USGS 7.5' topographic map Shawnee, Colorado

Shawnee Peak, elevation 11,932 ft (3,637 m), is a summit in the Kenosha Mountains of central Colorado. The peak is in the Lost Creek Wilderness of Pike National Forest west of Bailey.

== See also ==
- List of Colorado mountain ranges
- List of Colorado mountain summits
  - List of Colorado fourteeners
  - List of Colorado 4000 meter prominent summits
  - List of the most prominent summits of Colorado
- List of Colorado county high points
