= Kid Speer =

American baseball player (1886–1946)

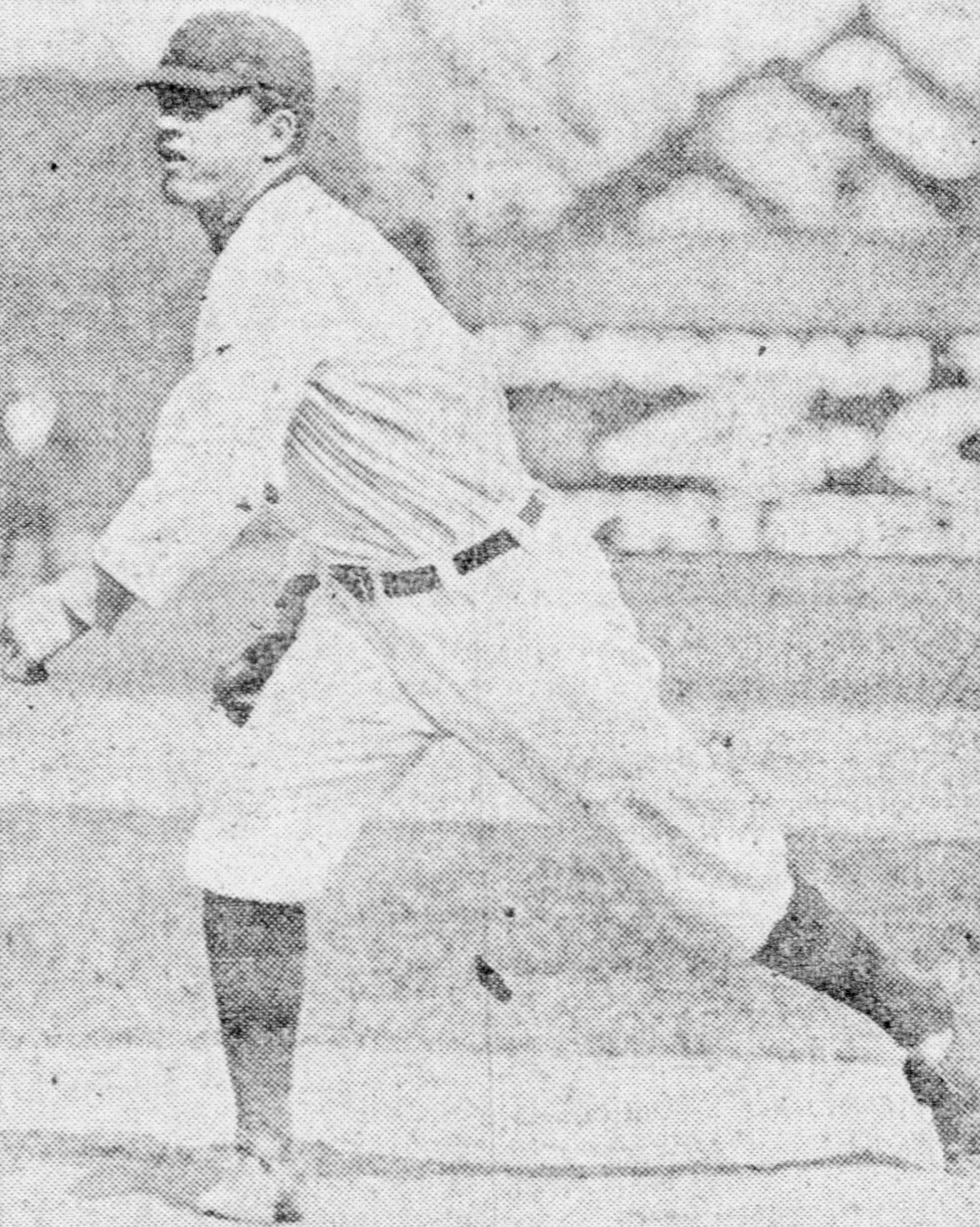
- Speer as he appeared in a 1914 issue of the Fort Worth Star-Telegram
- Pitcher
- Born: June 16, 1886; Corning, Missouri, U.S.
- Died: January 13, 1946 (aged 59); Edmonton, Alberta, Canada
- Batted: Left Threw: Left

MLB debut
- April 24, 1909, for the Detroit Tigers

Last MLB appearance
- October 1, 1909, for the Detroit Tigers

MLB statistics
- Win–loss record: 4–4
- Earned run average: 2.83
- Strikeouts: 12
- Stats at Baseball Reference

Teams
- Detroit Tigers (1909)

George Nathan "Kid" Speer (June 16, 1886 – January 13, 1946) was an American Major League Baseball pitcher. Speer played for the Detroit Tigers in 1909. In 12 career games, he had a 4–4 record with a 2.83 ERA. He batted and threw left-handed. Speer was born in Corning, Missouri, and died in Edmonton, Alberta.
