= El Reno Railroaders =

- 1904–1923; (1904, 1908–1910, 1922–1923); El Reno, Oklahoma

Minor league affiliations
- Class: Class D (1904, 1908); Class C (1909–1910); Class D (1922–1923)
- League: Southwestern League (1904); Oklahoma State League (1908); Western Association (1909–1910); Oklahoma State League (1922–1923)

Major league affiliations
- Team: None

Minor league titles
- League titles (0): None

Team data
- Name: El Reno Indians (1904, 1908); El Reno Packers (1909–1910); El Reno Railroaders (1922–1923)
- Ballpark: Peach's Park/Legion Park (1904, 1908–1910, 1922–1923)

The El Reno Railroaders were a minor league baseball team based in El Reno, Oklahoma. El Reno minor league teams played as members of the Southwestern League in 1904 and Oklahoma State League in 1908 known as the "Indians." The El Reno "Packers" were members of the Western Association in 1909 and 1910. The Railroaders played as members of the Oklahoma State League in 1922 and 1923.

The El Reno teams hosted minor league home games at Legion Park, formerly known as Peach's Park.

== History ==
Minor league baseball play began in El Reno, Oklahoma with the 1904 El Reno Indians who played briefly as members of the Southwestern League. On July 29, 1904, the Chickasha Indians franchise moved to El Reno and the franchise quickly folded after playing one game based in El Reno.

In 1908, the El Reno Indians became members of the Class D level Oklahoma State League. The Indians had a 4–5 record replacing the Hennessey Merry Widows, who had folded on May 19, 1908. The league began play on May 3, 1908, and folded on June 19, 1908.

El Reno gained a team in 1909 when the Joplin Miners relocated during the season to become the El Reno Packers. On July 4, 1909, Joplin moved to El Reno with a record 20-43 playing in the Class C level Western Association. The Joplin/El Reno team ended the 1909 season in last place with a record of 36–89. The team placed eighth under managers Thomas Hayden, Bailey Vinson and Jack McConnell, finishing 45.5 games behind the first place Enid Railroaders in the final standings.

In 1910, the El Reno Packers folded during the Western Association season. On July 31, 1910, with a record of 65–43, the El Reno Packers franchise folded. The 1910 player/manager was Art Riggs.

El Reno was without minor league baseball until the 1922 El Reno "Railroaders" rejoined the six–team, Class D level Oklahoma State League. The Railroaders of the Oklahoma State League ended the 1922 season with a record of 53–56. The Railroaders placed fourth in the final standings, finishing 16.0 games behind the first place Duncan Oilers as Virgil Moss served as manager.

The El Reno use of the "Railroaders" moniker corresponds to local industry. El Reno was home to the Rock Island Depot beginning in 1907. El Reno was also home to a Rock Island Railroad rail yard.

In their final season of play, the 1923 El Reno Railroaders placed seventh in the eight–team Oklahoma State League. The Railroaders ended the 1923 season with a record of 56–63 playing under manager Harry Burge. El Reno finished 12.0 games behind the first place Duncan Oilers in the final standings.

El Reno permanently folded following the 1923 season. El Reno, Oklahoma has not hosted another minor league team.

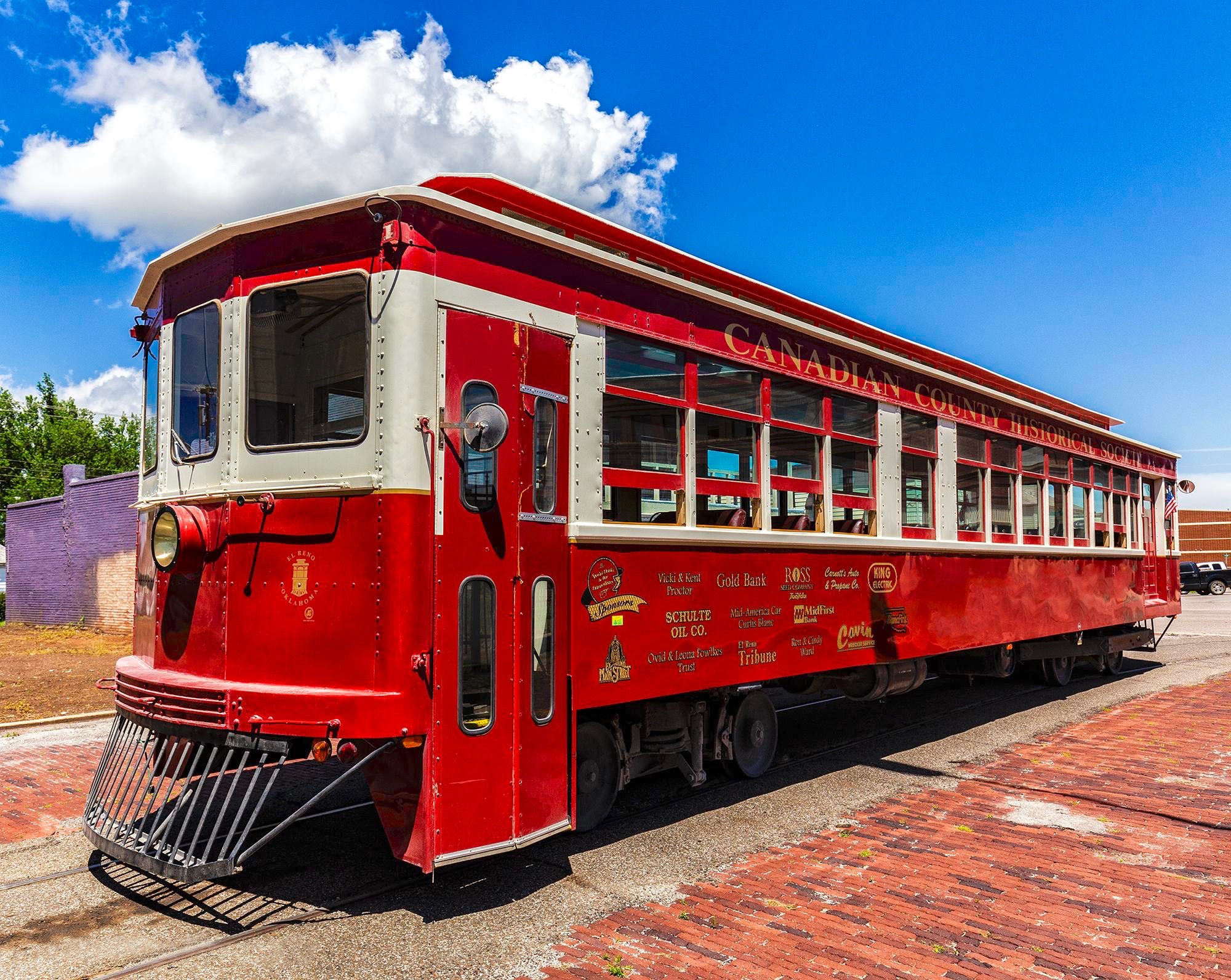
(2018) El Reno Heritage Express Trolley car in front of carbarn. El Reno, Oklahoma

== The ballpark ==
The El Reno minor league teams played home minor league games at Legion Park, formerly known as Peach's Park. Legion Park has been in continuous use since it hosted minor league baseball, and it is still in use as a public park with ballfields on the west side of the park property. The Legion Park property is bounded by West Pine Street to the north, South Reno Avenue to the east, West Ash Street to the south, and Morrison Avenue to the west.

== Timeline ==
Year(s)	# Yrs.	Team	Level	League	Ballpark
1904	1	El Reno Indians	Class D	Southwestern League	Adams Park
1908	1	El Reno Indians	Class D	Oklahoma State League	Adams Park
1909–1910	2	El Reno Packers	Class C	Western Association	Adams Park
1922–1923	2	El Reno Railroaders	Class D	Oklahoma State League	Adams Park

== Year–by–year records ==
Year	Record	Finish	Manager	Playoffs/Notes
1904	25–42	NA	William Hazlett / Lackey / Van Ness / Palmer	Chickaska moved to El Reno Aug 1 team folded after 0–1 record
1908	4–5	3rd	NA	replaced Hennessey May 19
1909	36–89	8th	Thomas Hayden / Bailey Vinson / Jack McConnell	Joplin moved to El Reno July 4; 16–46 in El Reno
1910	65–43	NA	Art Riggs	Team folded July 31
1922	53–56	4th	Virgil Moss	Did not qualify
1923	56–63	7th	Harry Burge	Did not qualify

== Notable alumni ==
- Mike Balenti (1909)
- Bert James (1910)
- Wild Bill Luhrsen (1910)
- Hank Robinson (1910)

== See also ==
- El Reno Packers players
