= Carl Hubbell =

American baseball player (1903–1988)

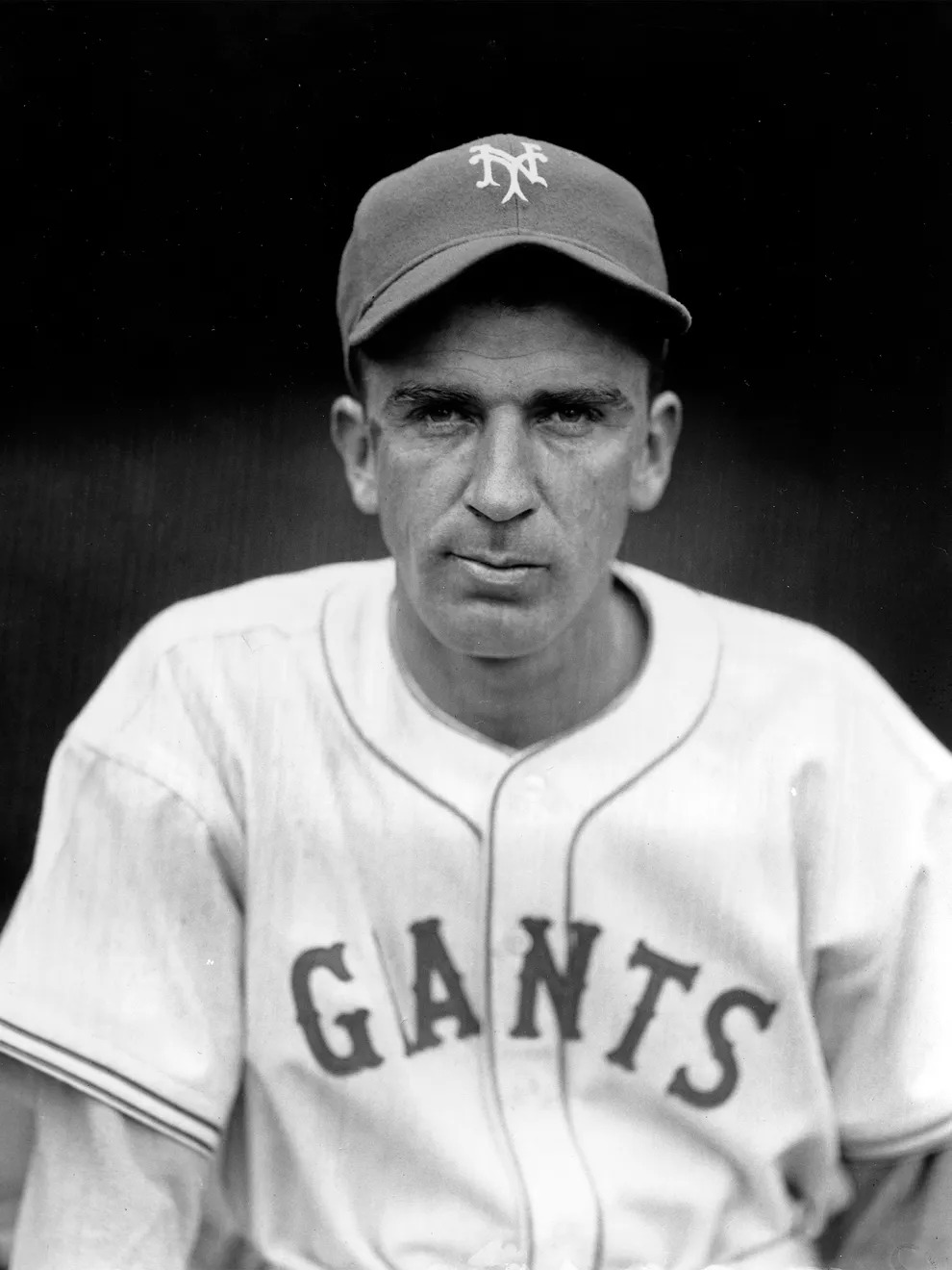
- Hubbell with the New York Giants in 1936
- Pitcher
- Born: June 22, 1903; Carthage, Missouri, U.S.
- Died: November 21, 1988 (aged 85); Scottsdale, Arizona, U.S.
- Batted: Right Threw: Left

MLB debut
- July 26, 1928, for the New York Giants

Last MLB appearance
- August 24, 1943, for the New York Giants

MLB statistics
- Win–loss record: 253–154
- Earned run average: 2.98
- Strikeouts: 1,677
- Stats at Baseball Reference

Teams
- New York Giants (1928–1943)

Career highlights and awards
- 9× All-Star (1933–1938, 1940–1942); World Series champion (1933); 2× NL MVP (1933, 1936); 3× NL wins leader (1933, 1936, 1937); 3× MLB ERA leader (1933, 1934, 1936); NL strikeout leader (1937); Pitched a no-hitter on May 8, 1929; San Francisco Giants No. 11 retired

Member of the National

Baseball Hall of Fame
- Induction: 1947
- Vote: 87.0% (third ballot)

Carl Owen Hubbell (June 22, 1903 – November 21, 1988), nicknamed "the Meal Ticket" and "King Carl", was an American Major League Baseball (MLB) player. He was a pitcher for the New York Giants of the National League (NL) from 1928 to 1943, and remained on the team's payroll for the rest of his life, long after their move to San Francisco.

Twice voted the National League's Most Valuable Player, Hubbell was inducted into the Baseball Hall of Fame in 1947. During 1936 and 1937, Hubbell set the major league record for consecutive wins by a pitcher with 24. He is perhaps best remembered for his performance in the 1934 All-Star Game, when he struck out five future Hall of Famers – Babe Ruth, Lou Gehrig, Jimmie Foxx, Al Simmons and Joe Cronin – in succession. Hubbell's primary pitch was the screwball.

== Early years ==
Hubbell was born in Carthage, Missouri, to Margaret Dell (née Upp) and George Owen Hubbell, and was one of seven children. He was raised in Meeker, Oklahoma, where he attended Meeker High School.

After graduating from high school, Hubbell worked for an oil company and played for their baseball team which encouraged him to play professionally.

== Professional career ==
=== Minor leagues ===
Hubbell began his baseball career in the Oklahoma State League, in 1923. In 1925, he went 17–13 with the Oklahoma City Indians of the Western League with his trademark screwball; as a result, he was signed by the Detroit Tigers and was invited to spring training in 1926. However, pitching coach George McBride and player-manager Ty Cobb wanted him to scrap the screwball due to fears of injuries. For the rest of spring training, without his pitch, Hubbell was ineffective.

He was sent to the Toronto Maple Leafs in the International League before the start of the season and was forbidden from throwing the screwball. Without his signature pitch, Hubbell went a mediocre 7–7 on a championship team and was demoted to the Decatur Commodores of the Illinois–Indiana–Iowa League after spring training 1927. Despite a 14–7 record, the Tigers didn't invite him back for 1928, and he was sent to the Beaumont Exporters of the Texas League.

Hubbell was so fed up by this time that he told Beaumont manager Claude Robinson that he would retire and go into the oil business unless he was sold to another organization by the end of the season. Years later, he said that being unloaded by the Tigers was the best thing that ever happened to him.

Hubbell's break came that June, when Giants scout Dick Kinsella decided to take in a game between Hubbell's Exporters and the Houston Buffs while in Houston for the 1928 Democratic National Convention. He had not planned on doing any scouting, but was impressed by Hubbell. Kinsella called Giants manager John McGraw and mentioned that he knew of Hubbell's release by Detroit, prompted in part by Cobb's concerns about the screwball. McGraw replied that Christy Mathewson had a screwball (a fadeaway, as it was called in his time) and it did not seem to affect his arm. Kinsella followed Hubbell for a month and was still impressed.

=== New York Giants (1928–1943) ===
Hubbell would go 10–6 in his first major league season and would pitch his entire career for the Giants. With a slow delivery of his screwball, Hubbell recorded five consecutive 20-win seasons for the Giants (1933–37) and helped his team to three NL pennants and the 1933 World Series title. In the 1933 Series, he won two complete game victories, including an 11-inning 2–1 triumph in Game Four (the run was unearned). In six career Series starts, he was 4–2 with 32 strikeouts and a low 1.79 earned run average. Hubbell finished his career with a 253–154 record, 1677 strikeouts, 724 walks, 36 shutouts and a 2.98 ERA, in 35901/3 innings pitched.

As a hitter, Hubbell posted a .191 batting average (246-for-1288) with 95 runs, 30 doubles, 4 home runs, 101 RBI and 33 bases on balls. In six World Series appearances, he batted .211 (4-for-19) with 1 run and 1 RBI. Defensively, he recorded a .967 fielding percentage.

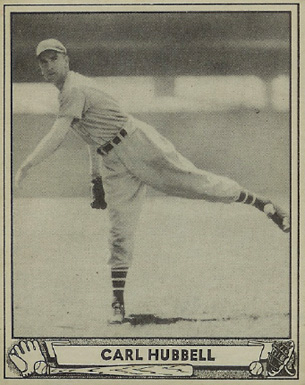
Hubbell's 1940 Play Ball baseball card

Hubbell won 24 consecutive decisions between 1936 (16) and 1937 (8), the longest such streak ever recorded in major league history. He was twice named National League MVP (1933, 1936) (1st unanimous MVP pick in 1936). He led the league in wins 3 times in 1933 (23), 1936 (26), and 1937 (22). Hubbell led the league in ERA three times in 1933 (1.66), 1934 (2.30), and 1936 (2.31). He led the league in innings pitched in 1933 (308). He led the league in strikeouts in 1937 (159). He led the league in strikeouts per 9 innings pitched in 1938 (5.23). He led the league in shutouts in 1933 (10). He led the league in saves in 1934 (eight, retroactively credited). He compiled a 461/3 consecutive scoreless innings streak and four shutouts in 1933. He pitched a no-hitter against the Pittsburgh Pirates (11–0, May 8, 1929). He pitched an 18-inning shutout against the St. Louis Cardinals (1–0, July 2, 1933).

In its 1936 World Series cover story about Lou Gehrig and Carl Hubbell, Time depicted the Fall Classic that year between crosstown rivals Giants and Yankees as "a personal struggle between Hubbell and Gehrig", calling Hubbell "...currently baseball's No. 1 Pitcher and among the half dozen ablest in the game's annals." Time said that while he was growing up on his family's Missouri farm, he "practiced for hours...throwing stones at a barn door until he could unfailingly hit knotholes no bigger than a dime".

Hubbell was released at the end of the 1943 season. He had posted a 4–4 record that year, marking the only time he did not record double-digit wins. However, Giants owner Horace Stoneham immediately appointed him as director of player development, a post he held for 35 years. During that time, he lived in Haworth, New Jersey; he continued to live there after the Giants left New York. The last ten years of his life were spent as a Giants scout. At the time of his death, he was one of the last New York Giants still active in some capacity in baseball, the last player from the McGraw era who was still active in the game, and one of the last living members of the franchise from McGraw's time.

== All-Star Game record ==
In the 1934 All Star Game played at the Polo Grounds, Hubbell produced one of baseball's most memorable moments by striking out five future Hall of Famers in succession: Babe Ruth, Lou Gehrig, Jimmie Foxx, Al Simmons and Joe Cronin. In 1984, the 50th anniversary of this legendary performance, Hubbell was on hand for the 1984 All-Star Game at San Francisco's Candlestick Park to throw out the first pitch, which was a screwball.

== Personal life ==
Hubbell was married to Lucille "Sue" Harrington (1905–1967) from 1930 until her death. They had two children: Carl Jr. (born 1936) and James. Carl Jr. had a brief career in the lower minor leagues and later was a career officer in the United States Marine Corps.

Hubbell suffered a stroke while driving near his home in Mesa, Arizona, on November 19, 1988, that caused him to lose control of his car and crash into a lamppost. He was taken to a hospital in Scottsdale, where he died of blunt force injuries two days later. He is interred at Meeker-Newhope Cemetery in Meeker, Oklahoma. His death came exactly 30 years after that of his teammate Mel Ott, who likewise died from injuries sustained in an automobile accident.

== Baseball honors ==
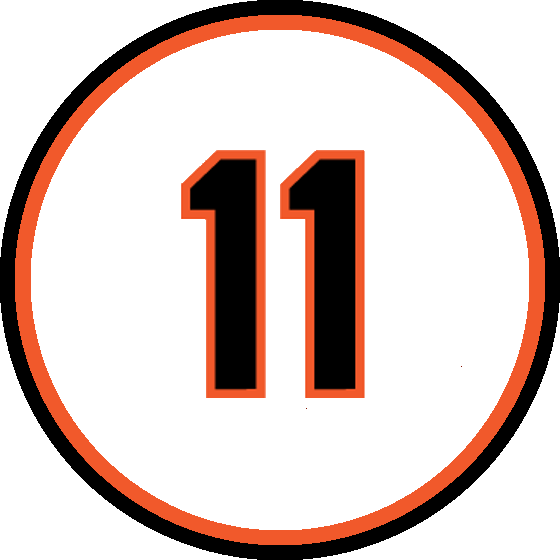
Carl Hubbell's number 11 was retired by the New York Giants in 1944.

Hubbell was a nine-time All-Star, having been honored each year from 1933 to 1938 and then again from 1940 to 1942. In 1999, he ranked number 45 on The Sporting News list of the 100 Greatest Baseball Players, and was a nominee for the Major League Baseball All-Century Team. Hubbell was inducted into the Baseball Hall of Fame in 1947. He was the first NL player to have his number (11) retired. His number is posted on the facing of the upper deck in the left field corner at Oracle Park. In 1981, Hubbell received the Golden Plate Award of the American Academy of Achievement.

Hubbell appeared as himself in the movie Big Leaguer, and was one of the players mentioned in the poem "Line-Up for Yesterday" by Ogden Nash:

Line-Up for Yesterday

U would be 'Ubbell
If Carl were a Cockney;
We say Hubbell and baseball
Like football and Rockne.

— Ogden Nash, Sport magazine (January 1949)

== See also ==
- List of Major League Baseball individual streaks
- List of Major League Baseball career wins leaders
- List of Major League Baseball annual ERA leaders
- List of Major League Baseball annual saves leaders
- List of Major League Baseball annual strikeout leaders
- List of Major League Baseball annual wins leaders
- List of Major League Baseball no-hitters
- List of Major League Baseball players who spent their entire career with one franchise
- Associated Press Athlete of the Year

Awards and achievements
Preceded by Ted Lyons	No-hitter pitcher May 8, 1929	Succeeded by Wes Ferrell
