= Muskogee Indians =

The Muskogee Indians was a South Central League (1906) and Oklahoma State League (1912) minor league baseball team based in Muskogee, Oklahoma, United States.

Ben Tincup, who pitched for four seasons in the major leagues, played for the Indians. In 1906, they were managed for part of the season by Nixey Callahan; in 1912, they were skippered for part of the year by Kid Speer.
