= Tex Jones =

American baseball player (1885–1938)

- First baseman
- Born: August 4, 1885; Marion, Kansas, U.S.
- Died: February 26, 1938 (aged 52); Wichita, Kansas, U.S.
- Batted: Right Threw: Right

MLB debut
- April 13, 1911, for the Chicago White Sox

Last MLB appearance
- April 23, 1911, for the Chicago White Sox

MLB statistics
- Batting average: .194
- Home runs: 0
- Runs batted in: 4
- Stats at Baseball Reference

Teams
- Chicago White Sox (1911)

William Roderick "Tex" Jones (August 4, 1885 – February 26, 1938) was an American Major League Baseball player for the Chicago White Sox in the 1911 season. In nine games, he had six hits in 31 at-bats, with four RBIs. He batted and threw right-handed.

He was born in Marion, Kansas, and died in Wichita, Kansas.
