= Mike Balenti =

American baseball player (1886–1955)

- Shortstop
- Born: July 3, 1886; Calumet, Oklahoma Territory
- Died: August 4, 1955 (aged 69); Altus, Oklahoma, U.S.
- Batted: Right Threw: Right

MLB debut
- July 19, 1911, for the Cincinnati Reds

Last MLB appearance
- September 22, 1913, for the St. Louis Browns

MLB statistics
- Batting average: .183
- Home runs: 0
- Runs batted in: 11
- Stats at Baseball Reference

Teams
- Cincinnati Reds (1911); St. Louis Browns (1913)

Michael Richard Balenti (July 3, 1886 – August 4, 1955) was a Major League Baseball shortstop and left fielder who played 70 games for the Cincinnati Reds and the St. Louis Browns in 1911 and 1913, respectively.

His maternal grandfather, Charles Rath, was the namesake of Rath City, Texas. Balenti's mother was born of Charles Rath's marriage to a Cheyenne woman named Making-Out-Roads. Balenti himself was born of his mother's marriage to a Hungarian immigrant. Charles Rath's later marriage to a white woman bore him a son named Morrie Rath, against whom Balenti played in the American League without knowing they were related.

Balenti married an Alaska Native, Cecilia Baronovich, whom he met while attending Carlisle Indian School. They lived among the Cheyenne in Oklahoma part-time and among Cecilia's people in Alaska during the off-seasons. On at least one occasion it took Balenti two months to travel from his minor league club's home in Chattanooga to his off-season home in Alaska. After retirement, he worked in construction in Altus, Oklahoma.

== Head coaching record ==
Year	Team	Overall	Conference	Standing	Bowl/playoffs
Chattanooga Moccasins (Southern Intercollegiate Athletic Association) (1914)
1914	Chattanooga	5–4	1–3	13th	
Chattanooga:		5–4	1–3		
Total:		5–4			
