= Pawhuska Huskers =

American baseball team (1920–1921)

The Pawhuska Huskers were a Western Association baseball team based in Pawhuska, Oklahoma United States that played from 1920 to 1921. Over the course of their two-year existence, only one known major league player played for them: Rudy Hulswitt. He also managed them in 1921.
