= Frank Thompson (third baseman) =

American baseball player (1895-1940)

- Third baseman
- Born: July 2, 1895; Springfield, Missouri, U.S.
- Died: June 27, 1940 (aged 44); Webb City, Missouri, U.S.
- Batted: Right Threw: Right

MLB debut
- May 6, 1920, for the St. Louis Browns

Last MLB appearance
- August 17, 1920, for the St. Louis Browns

MLB statistics
- Batting average: .170
- Home runs: 0
- Runs batted in: 5
- Stats at Baseball Reference

Teams
- St. Louis Browns (1920)

Frank E. Thompson (July 2, 1895 – June 27, 1940) was an American professional baseball player and manager. He appeared in Major League Baseball (MLB) as a third baseman for the St. Louis Browns in 1920. He played professionally from 1914 through 1924, appearing in over 800 minor-league games. He then served as a minor-league manager during 1925 and 1926.
