= Larry McLean =

Canadian baseball player (1881–1921)

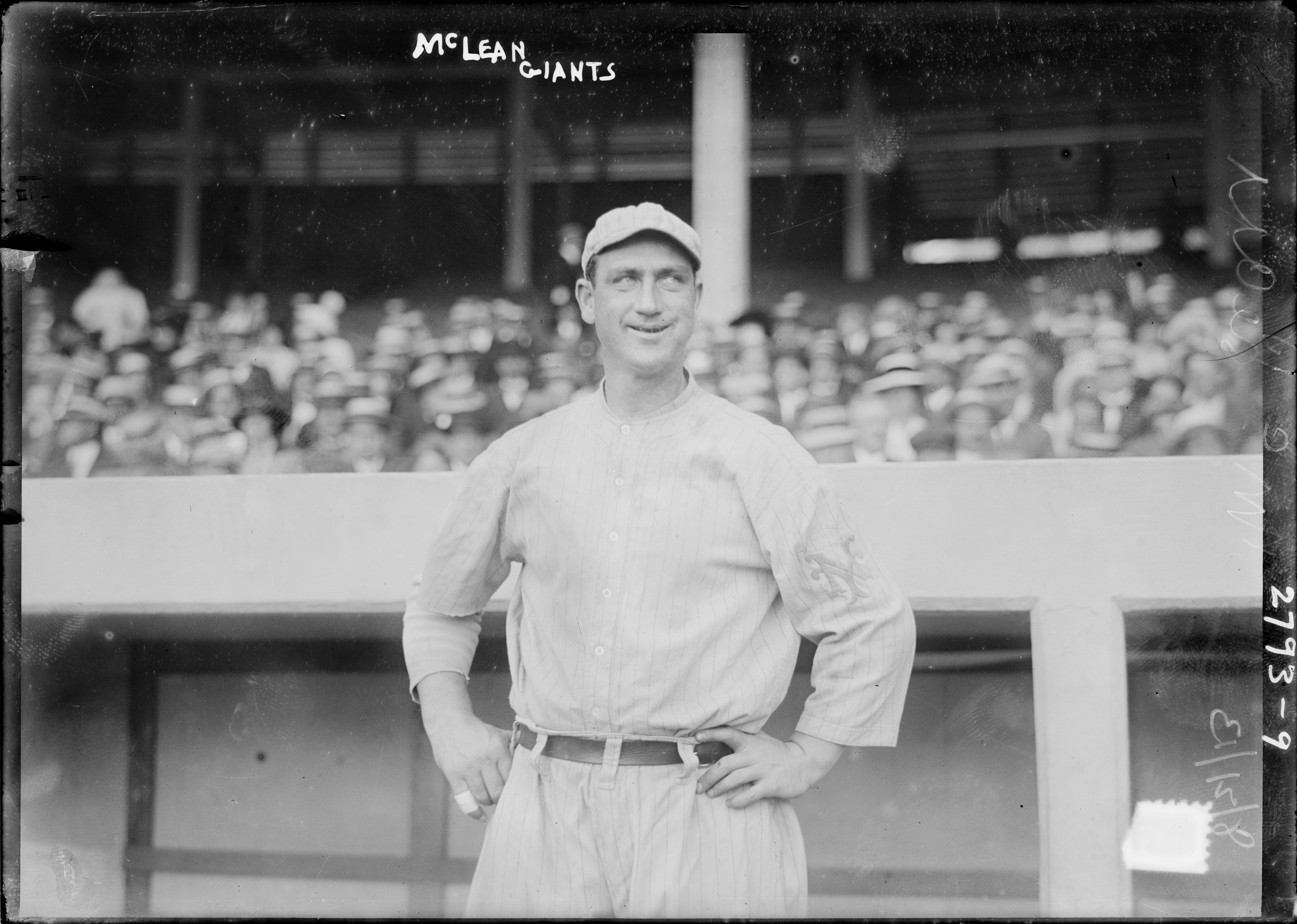
- McLean with the New York Giants in 1913
- Catcher
- Born: July 18, 1881; Fredericton, New Brunswick, Canada
- Died: March 24, 1921 (aged 39); Boston, Massachusetts, U.S.
- Batted: Right Threw: Right

MLB debut
- April 26, 1901, for the Boston Americans

Last MLB appearance
- June 6, 1915, for the New York Giants

MLB statistics
- Batting average: .262
- Home runs: 6
- Runs batted in: 298
- Stats at Baseball Reference

Teams
- Boston Americans (1901); Chicago Cubs (1903); St. Louis Cardinals (1904); Cincinnati Reds (1906–1912); St. Louis Cardinals (1913); New York Giants (1913–1915)

Member of the Canadian

Baseball Hall of Fame
- Induction: 2006

John Bannerman McLean (July 18, 1881 – March 24, 1921) was a Canadian professional baseball catcher between 1901 until 1915. During his years in Major League Baseball, he played with five different teams. Beginning his career with the Boston Americans, his final professional game was played with the New York Giants on June 6, 1915.

McLean was one of the tallest catchers in Major League Baseball history, standing 6 feet, 5 inches.

Known for his heavy drinking and violent behavior, McLean's career ended after a 1915 brawl with New York Giants manager John McGraw and team scout Dick Kinsella. He was fatally shot by a bartender six years after his last major league appearance.

== Early life ==
McLean was born in Fredericton, New Brunswick. He earned the nickname Larry after the alternate moniker ascribed to Nap Lajoie, a star baseball player who McLean was said to resemble. In 1901, while McLean and Fred Mitchell were playing for a local team in Saint John, New Brunswick, they were scouted and signed by the fledgling Boston Red Sox.

== Playing career ==
On December 12, 1903, McLean was traded from the Cubs to the Cardinals in what has been described as "one of the worst trades in Cardinals history." McLean and Jack Taylor were traded to the Cardinals in exchange for future Baseball Hall of Fame member Mordecai Brown and Jack O'Neill.

McLean was known to chew large amounts of Brown's Mule tobacco and was a heavy drinker of corn whiskey. When he signed with the Portland Beavers of the Pacific Coast League in 1905, he became teammates with a pitcher who also struggled with alcohol use, Ned Garvin. Baseball author Dennis Snelling said this pitcher-catcher combination formed "one of the most volatile batteries in the history of the game."

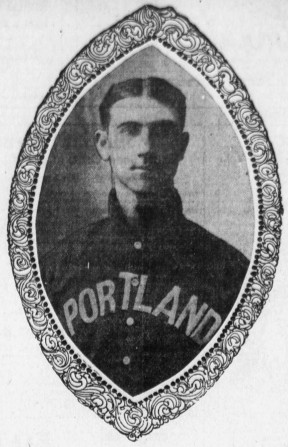
McLean in 1905

In 1906, McLean signed with Portland again for a $1400 annual salary. McLean's wife publicly voiced her objection to the salary and said Portland owner William Wallace McCredie was not paying McLean consistent with his value. She said the minor-league team in Altoona was willing to sign him for $2400 per year. McLean did play in 88 games with the 1906 Portland Beavers and hit .355. The team won the Pacific Coast League; the second-place team was 21 games out of first place. A drinking incident with Cincinnati that year ended with McLean jumping into the fountain at the Buckingham Hotel, which resulted in McLean being demoted back to the minor leagues by manager Kid Nichols. "I can pitch to Larry real good, but I can't manage him worth a dime," Nichols said.

Before the 1910 season, the Reds suspended McLean after he violated team rules during spring training at Hot Springs, Arkansas. In response to the suspension, McLean wrote a "letter of resignation" from the club. His resignation was accepted, although he was later allowed to rejoin the team with the caveats he would play for a reduced salary and would sit out the first week of the regular season.

In August 1913, McLean was traded from the St. Louis Cardinals to the New York Giants in exchange for Doc Crandall. Chief Meyers was the Giants' primary catcher, but was injured during the 1913 postseason, so McLean played five games in the 1913 World Series. McLean was the first player born in New Brunswick to appear in a World Series.

== Career-ending fight ==
In June 1915, McLean engaged in a brawl with Giants manager John McGraw and scout Dick Kinsella. McLean had recently been suspended for ten days for failing to stay in shape. He was angry at Kinsella because he felt the scout had convinced McGraw to suspend him. McLean and several companions entered the lobby of the team's hotel and attacked Kinsella. The melee escalated and Kinsella broke a chair over McLean's head while several team members worked to subdue McLean. The catcher and his companions then fled in a car.

McGraw dismissed McLean from the Giants later that day. McLean's playing time had been in decline since 1913. Despite McLean's attempts to regain his place on the team, Chief Meyers fully took over the team's catching responsibilities after McLean's dismissal and McLean did not appear in another major league game.

In his thirteen-year career, McLean posted a .262 batting average, which included six home runs and 298 RBIs in 862 games played.

== Death ==
McLean was killed on March 24, 1921, in Boston, where he was shot by the manager of a saloon. He had become unruly the night before his death and chased a bartender out of the saloon. When McLean returned on the night of March 24, he became offended when the manager refused to give him a cigarette. The manager said McLean was attempting to crawl over the bar, aided by his friend Jack McCarthy, when the manager fired a gunshot.

McLean was dead when he arrived at the hospital, while McCarthy was hospitalized with a gunshot wound to the stomach. The saloon manager, James J. Connor, was arrested on suspicion of murder, and later sentenced to one year in prison.

== Legacy ==
McLean received one vote in the 1937 Baseball Hall of Fame elections. He was inducted into the New Brunswick Sports Hall of Fame in 2000 and the Canadian Baseball Hall of Fame in 2006.

At 6 ft 5 in (1.96 m), McLean long held the record as being the tallest catcher in major league history.

== See also ==
- List of Major League Baseball players from Canada
