= Oklahoma City Indians =

- 1904–1957; (1904–1912, 1914–1942, 1946–1957); Oklahoma City, Oklahoma

Minor league affiliations
- Class: Double-A (1946–1957); Class A1 (1936–1942); Class A (1918–1935); Class B (1911); Class C (1905–1910); Class D (1904, 1912, 1914–1917)
- League: Texas League (1909–1911, 1933–1942, 1946–1957); Western League (1918–1932); Western Association (1905–1908, 1914–1917); Oklahoma State League (1912); Southwestern League (1904)

Major league affiliations
- Team: Boston Red Sox (1956–1957); Cleveland Indians (1941, 1946–1950); New York Giants (1942)

Minor league titles
- Dixie Series titles (1): 1935
- League titles (4): 1914; 1915; 1923; 1935

Team data
- Name: Oklahoma City Indians (1918–1942, 1946–1957); Oklahoma City Boosters (1917); Oklahoma City Senators (1915–1916); Oklahoma City Boosters (1914); Oklahoma City Indians (1909–1912); Oklahoma City Mets (1904–1908)
- Ballpark: Holland Field, Texas League Park, Western League Park
- Owners/ Operators: Jimmie Humphries (1951–1957); Bill Veeck & Rudie Schaffer (1948–1951); Harold O. Pope (1945–1948); Harold O. Pope & C. R. Virtue (1942–1945); John Holland family (1918–1942)

The Oklahoma City Indians was the primary name of an American professional baseball team representing Oklahoma City, Oklahoma, from 1904 though 1957, except for 1913 and three seasons during World War II. The team played in several different minor league baseball leagues, primarily the Texas League and the Western League. The team was known as the Mets, Boosters, and Senators at different times during its early years.

== History ==
A team representing Oklahoma City first played in the Southwestern League in 1904. The city was represented continuously in minor league baseball through 1957, except for four seasons. Following the disbanding of the Oklahoma State League during the 1912 season, Oklahoma City did not have a professional team in 1913, although several Western League teams played exhibition games in the city. During World War II, play was suspended for three seasons, 1943–1945, and resumed in 1946.

In addition to competing in the Southwestern League in 1904 and the Oklahoma State League in 1912, Oklahoma City teams played in the Western Association during 1905–1908 and 1914–1917; the Texas League during 1909–1911, 1933–1942 and 1946–1957; and the Western League from 1918 to 1932. Oklahoma City teams played their home games at Western League Park, Holland Field and Texas League Park.

Minor league classifications varied somewhat during the team's lifetime, but the Western and Texas leagues of the post-World War I era—rated Class A, A1 or Double-A—were high-level circuits that usually ranked two notches below Major League Baseball calibre.

The Indians won the 1935 Texas League championship and two years later captured 101 regular-season victories, but generally struggled in the Texas League standings. Additionally, they won the 1935 Dixie Series, a postseason interleague championship between the champions of the Southern Association and the Texas League. In the club's last three seasons, 1955–1957, it lost 90, 106 and 88 games. The team spent the post-World War II period as the Double-A affiliate of the Cleveland Indians, but the Oklahoma City Indians' nickname long preceded that relationship. The Indians team spent many years as an unaffiliated franchise, and in its last two seasons was a farm club of the Boston Red Sox.

Baseball Hall of Fame player Rogers Hornsby managed the Indians for part of the 1940 season, and broadcaster Curt Gowdy launched his baseball announcing career with the postwar Indians; when he left in early 1949, Gowdy's replacement was Bob Murphy. Both Gowdy and Murphy went on to win the Ford C. Frick Award from the Baseball Hall of Fame. Former minor league player and manager Jimmie Humphries, who owned the team during the 1950s, was with the Indians in different capacities from 1919 through 1957, "one of the longest careers with a single franchise in baseball history."

The Oklahoma City Indians moved to Corpus Christi when the Texas League reorganized following the 1957 season. Five years later, the Oklahoma City 89ers, Triple-A affiliate of the Houston Colt .45s, then a major league expansion team (now known as the Houston Astros), debuted in the American Association. The Triple-A franchise has played continuously since 1962, and since 2025 has been the Oklahoma City Comets.

== Notable alumni ==
Players with Oklahoma City who also appeared in Major League Baseball (MLB) include:

- Frank Baumann
- Al Benton
- Ray Boone
- Ted Bowsfield
- Dick Conger
- Estel Crabtree
- Nick Etten
- Joe Frazier
- Mike Garcia
- Pumpsie Green
- Orval Grove
- Jim Hegan
- Carl Hubbell
- Randy Jackson
- Sheldon Jones
- Vern Kennedy
- Don Kolloway
- Jim Lemon
- Eddie Lopat
- Ken McBride
- Dale Mitchell
- Hal Naragon
- Bill Nicholson
- Johnny Niggeling
- Albie Pearson
- Al Rosen
- Thurman Tucker
- Bill Voiselle
- Emil Yde
- Jerry Zimmerman

| Preceded by Birmingham Barons (1952) | Boston Red Sox; Double-A affiliate 1956–1957 | Succeeded by Memphis Chickasaws |
