= McAlester Miners =

American baseball team

Information
- League: Western Association (last)
- Location: McAlester, Oklahoma
- Ballpark: League Park (1907–1912); Interurban Park (1914–1917)
- Founded: 1907
- League championships: 1 (1917)

The McAlester Miners were a minor league baseball team based in McAlester, Oklahoma, that existed on-and-off from 1907 to 1926. In 1907, they played in the Oklahoma–Arkansas–Kansas League, in 1908 they played in the Oklahoma–Kansas League, in 1912 they played in the Oklahoma State League, and from 1914 to 1917, in 1922 and in 1926 they played in the Western Association.

== League championships ==
Throughout their history, they won one league championship – in 1917, under manager Jimmie Humphries. That year, they finished first in the league with a 95–57 record.

== Notable alumni ==
=== Baseball Hall of Fame alumni ===
- Deacon White (1907) Inducted, 2013

=== Notable alumni ===
- Harry Coveleski (1922, MGR)
- Jimmie Humphries (1917, MGR)
- Roy Johnson (1915)
- Jerry Kane (1912, 1914, MGR)
- Phil Ketter (1915)
- Pryor McBee (1923)
- Rolla Mapel (1916)
- Rollie Naylor (1916)
- Frank Thompson (1916)
- Cotton Tierney (1912)

=== See also ===
McAlester Miners players
