= Enid, Oklahoma minor league baseball history =

Enid, Oklahoma minor league baseball teams
- 1904–1951; (1904, 1908–1910, 1920–1926, 1950–1951); Enid, Oklahoma

Minor league affiliations
- Class: Class D (1904); Class C (1908–1910); Class D (1920–1921); Class C (1922–1923); Class D (1924); Class C (1924-1926, 1950–1951)
- League: Southwestern League (1904); Western Association (1908–1910, 1920–1923); Oklahoma State League (1924); Southwestern League (1924–1926); Western Association (1950–1951)

Major league affiliations
- Team: New York Giants (1950)

Minor league titles
- League titles (2): 1909; 1920
- Conference titles (1): 1922

Team data
- Name: Enid Evangelists (1904); Enid Railroaders (1908–1910); Enid Harvesters (1920–1924); Enid Boosters (1925–1926); Enid Giants (1950); Enid Buffaloes (1951)
- Ballpark: League Park (1908–1910); Association Park (1920–1926); City Stadium (1950–1951)

Minor league baseball teams were based in Enid, Oklahoma in various seasons between 1904 and 1951. Enid minor league teams played as members of the Southwestern League (1904), Western Association (1908–1910, 1920–1923), Oklahoma State League (1924), Southwestern League (1924–1926) and Western Association (1950–1951), winning two league championships.

The 1950 Enid Giants were a minor league affiliate of the New York Giants.

The 1922 Enid Harvesters finished with a 104–27 record, a .794 winning percentage. The 1922 Harvesters are listed as one of the best all–time minor league teams.

== History ==
Minor league baseball began in Enid, Oklahoma in 1904. The 1904 Enid Evangelists began play as members of the reformed Class D level Southwestern League. The 1904 Evangelists finished with a record of 46–37, placing second in the four–team Southwestern League. Enid was managed by Howard Price and Walter Frantz. The Southwestern League had reformed in 1904 and folded after the 1904 season.

In 1908, minor league baseball returned as the Enid Railroaders became members of the Class C level Western Association. The Railroaders finished the season with a 38–99 record and placed eighth and last in the Western Association standings. Enid played home games at Traction Park. Enid was managed in 1908 by Walter Frantz, William Kimmell, George Hulbert and Red Wright.

The 1909 Enid Railroaders were the Western Association champions. Enid finished with a record of 82–41 to capture first place in the standings, playing under manager Ted Price. With no playoffs, Enid finished 7.5 games ahead of the second place Muskogee Navigators in the final Western Association standings to capture the championship.

Enid continued play in the 1910 Western Association and had a runner up finish in defending their title. The Enid Railroaders finished with a record of 64–53 and in second place in the eight–team Western Association. The 1910 Enid manager was Bob Kennedy. The Enid franchise folded after the 1910 season.

In 1920, Enid rejoined the eight–team Western Association, which was reformed after folding in 1917, and won a disputed league championship. Playing in the Western Association, the 1920 Enid Harvesters finished the regular season with an overall record of 71–53 and in fourth place overall, winning the split–season second half pennant, playing under manager Ted Waring. In the 1920 playoffs, the Okmulgee Drillers and Enid Harvesters were tied 3 games to 3. Enid then won the seventh game, but the Western Association president later invalidated the victory.

In the 1921 Western Association, the Enid Harvesters ended the season with a 77–74 record, placing fifth overall. The 1921 manager was Barney Cleveland. On August 21, 1921, Enid pitcher Albert Miller pitched a no-hitter against the Henryetta Hens in a 5–1 victory.

The 1922 Enid Harvesters were a historically successful team. The Harvesters finished the regular season with a record of 104–27, for a .794 winning percentage. Enid finished 13.0 games ahead of the second place Joplin Miners (93–42) in the regular season standings. The 1922 Enid Harvesters have been ranked as one of the top 20 of The National Baseball Association's top 100 minor league teams. Enid was defeated in the 1922 league championship playoff by Joplin, but remain historically noted because of their overall 1922 season under manager Tom Downey.

The Enid Harvesters finished with an 80–65 record in the 1923 Class C Western Association, finishing in fourth place. The Enid manager was again Tom Downey.

In 1924, Enid simultaneously hosted two teams in two leagues. First, the Enid Harvesters continued play, moving from the Western Association to become members of the 1924 Class D level Southwestern League. Playing in the 1924 Southwestern League, the Enid Harvesters finished with a record of 65–67, placing fourth in the league. The managers were Babe Ellison and George Dye.

Enid also briefly hosted a second team in the 1924 season. The Guthrie team (8–18) of the Oklahoma State League moved first to McAlester, Oklahoma on May 24, 1924. McAlester then moved to Wewoka–Holdenville on June 8, 1924. The franchise then moved to Enid in late June and finished the 1924 season playing in Enid. On July 8, 1924, the Oklahoma State League Enid team had an overall record of 18–48 and were in seventh place under managers M. H. Robertson and Ted Lipps when the Oklahoma State League permanently folded.

Enid continued play as the Enid Boosters in 1925. Enid became members of the 1925 Class D level Southwestern League. The Enid Boosters were 20–27 on June 17, 1925, when the franchise relocated to Shawnee, Oklahoma and finished the season playing as the Shawnee Braves. Enid/Shawnee finished the 1925 Southwestern League 52–76 and in sixth place under managers Ben Dimond and George Dye.

In 1926, Enid regained a franchise and the Enid Boosters returned to Southwestern League play. The Boosters had a record of 70–49, placing second in the Southwestern League under manager George Dye, while playing at Association Park. In the 1926 playoffs, the Salina Millers defeated the Enid Boosters 3 games to 1. The Southwestern League folded after the 1926 season.

After a 24–year span, minor league baseball returned to Enid, Oklahoma in 1950. The Fort Smith Giants of the Class C level Western Association relocated and the Enid Giants became members of the eight–team league, playing as an affiliate of the New York Giants. The 1950 Enid Giants finished with a record of 71–63, for fourth place in the Western Association under manager Harold Kollar, playing at Enid Baseball Park. Enid's 1950 season home attendance was 40,713, an average of 608 per home game.

The Enid Buffalos continued play in the 1951 Western Association as an affiliate of the Class A Houston Buffaloes, who were themselves owned by the St. Louis Cardinals. The Enid Buffalos finished the regular season with a 45–79 record, placing seventh in the Western Association final standings. The Buffalos were managed by Ray Honeycutt. Enid had season attendance of 39,584, an average of 638 per game. Enid folded after the 1951 season, as the Western League played in 1952 as a six–team league.

Enid, Oklahoma has not hosted another minor league team.

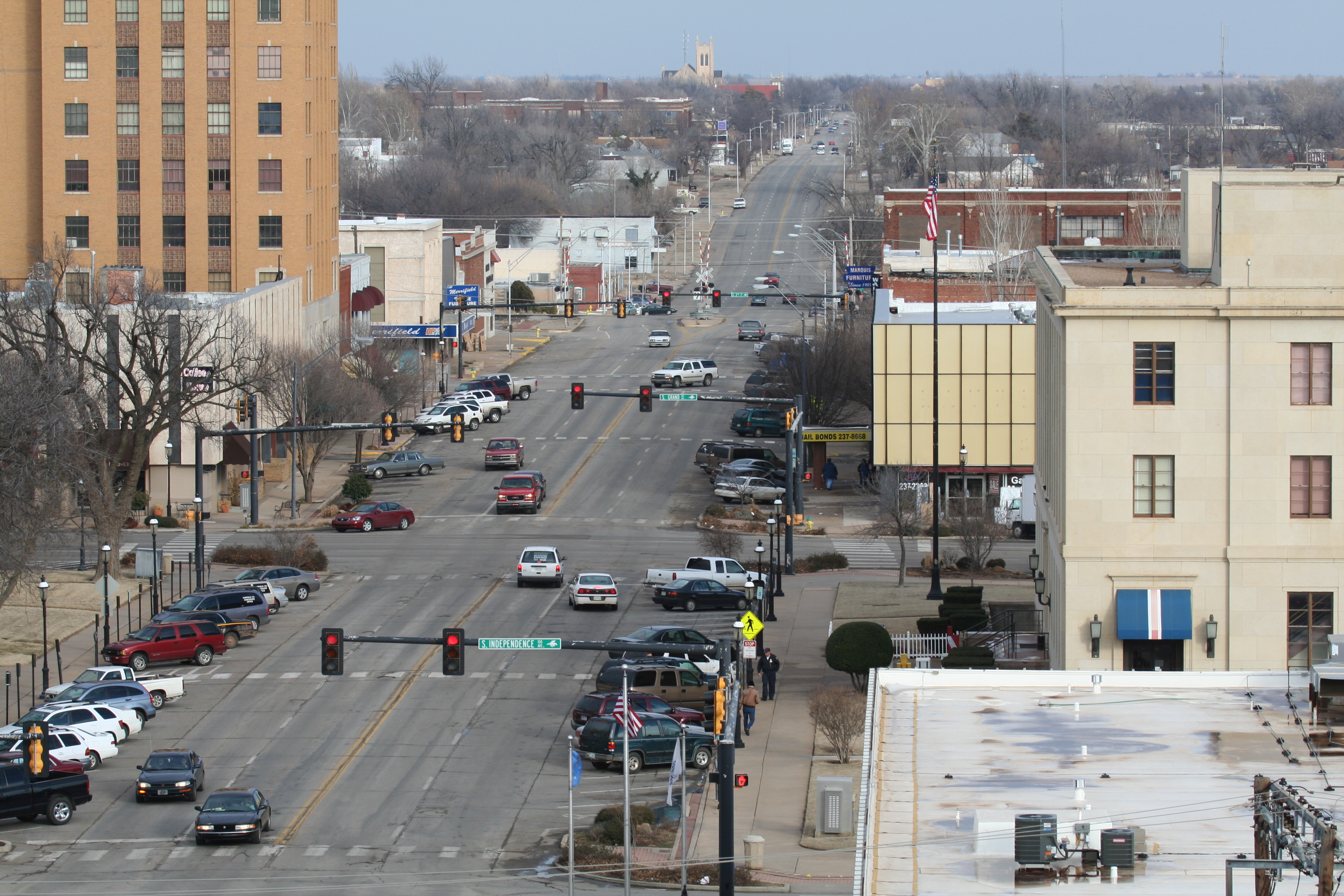
(2007) Broadway Avenue. Enid, Oklahoma

== The ballparks ==
Early Enid teams were noted to have played minor league home games at League Park. The League Park grounds were located at the southeast corner of West Market Street (now Owen K. Garriott Road) and South Van Buren Street, and could be accessed by the Enid street railway system.

The Enid teams from 1920 to 1926 were referenced to have played at Association Park. Association Park was located at East Pine Avenue & North 2nd Street and East Oak Avenue & North 3rd Street.

In 1950 and 1951, teams were noted to have played home games at the Enid Baseball Park. Also known as "City Stadium," the ballpark had a capacity of 3,200 and has been destroyed.

== Notable alumni ==
- George Abrams (1922)
- Sled Allen (1908–1909)
- Dud Branom (1920, 1922)
- Chuck Corgan (1924)
- Dick Crutcher (1910)
- Phil Gallivan (1926)
- Bob Harrison (1950)
- George Hulbert (1908)
- Tex Jones (1908–1909)
- LaRue Kirby (1920)
- Jimmie Long (1923)
- Bill McGill (1908)
- Jack Roche (1923)
- Bob Seeds (1926)
- Ernie Smith (1923)
- Don Songer (1922)
- Joe Sprinz (1924–1925)
- Enid Boosters players
- Enid Harvesters players
- Enid Railroaders players
