= Guthrie Senators =

- (1904-1906, 1909-1910, 1912, 1914, 1922-1924); Guthrie, Oklahoma

Minor league affiliations
- Previous classes: Class D (1904, 1906, 1912, 1922-1924); Class C (1905, 1909-1910, 1914)
- Previous leagues: Oklahoma State League (1912, 1922-1924); Western Association (1905, 1909-1910, 1914); South Central League (1906); Southwestern League (1904)

Team data
- Previous names: Guthrie Linters (1922–1924); Guthrie Orphans (1914); Guthrie Spas (1912); Guthrie Senators (1905-1906, 1909-1910); Guthrie Blues (1904)
- Previous parks: Island Park (1904); Electric Park (1905-1906, 1909-1910); Fairgrounds Park (1912, 1914, 1922-1924)

Guthrie Senators was the primary name of the minor league baseball teams based in Guthrie, Oklahoma, United States.

== History ==
The Guthrie Senators played in the Western Association (1905, 1909–1910) and South Central League (1906). Later, the Guthrie teams played in the Oklahoma State League (1912, 1922–1924) as the Guthrie Spas in 1912. and the Guthrie Linters in 1922 and 1923. Guthrie was also represented in the Western Association for a brief time in 1914, under the name Guthrie Orphans.

== The ballparks ==
Although the Guthrie ballpark had different names over the years, it was consistently located in what is now known as Mineral Wells Park.

The field used by the 1904 Guthrie Blues was known as the Island Park diamond. Island Park was renamed Mineral Wells Park in 1910. The Island Park athletic field, which later in 1904 hosted the first Bedlam Series football game between Oklahoma A&M University (now Oklahoma State University and the University of Oklahoma, was located just across Cottonwood Creek from the current park gazebo.

Beginning in 1905, Guthrie's ballpark was known as Electric Park. Electric Park was also located immediately across Cottonwood Creek from the “island” portion of Island/Mineral Wells Park. The Guthrie Senators used Electric Park as their home field through 1910.

In 1911, the City of Guthrie purchased Electric Park from the streetcar owners who developed it and consolidated the land, including the ballpark, into Mineral Wells Park. Further amenities were added, including a racetrack and fairgrounds, around the existing ballpark. Guthrie teams continued playing at the fairgrounds ballpark through the final days of minor league baseball in 1924.

== Notable alumni ==
Notable players include Red Downs, Eddie Hickey, Tex Jones, Bill McGill and Clare Patterson. They were managed for part of the 1906 season by Charlie Bennett.
