= Sooner State League =

- Most recent season or competition: 1957 Sooner State League season
- Classification: Class D (1947–1957)
- Sport: Baseball
- First season: 1947
- Folded: 1957
- President: Jack Mealey (1947–1951); Uke Clanton (1952–1955); George Barr (1956–1957)
- No. of teams: 15
- Country: United States of America
- Most titles: 5 McAlester Rockets
- Related competitions: Kansas-Oklahoma-Missouri League

The Sooner State League was a Class D level minor league baseball league that operated from 1947 through 1957. The league owners kept it alive in 1958, anticipating a return to play in 1959. However, when only Ardmore and Paris, Texas, were able to secure working agreements, the league folded on February 12, 1959. The league franchises were based in Oklahoma and Texas.

== Cities represented ==
- Ada, Oklahoma: Ada Herefords (1947–1954); Ada Cementers (8/3/1954)
- Ardmore, Oklahoma: Ardmore Indians (1947–1952); Ardmore Cardinals (1953–1957)
- Chickasha, Oklahoma: Chickasha Chiefs (1948–1952)
- Duncan, Oklahoma: Duncan Cementers (1947–1948); Duncan Uttmen (1949–1950)
- Gainesville, Texas: Gainesville Owls (1953–1955)
- Greenville, Texas: Greenville Majors (1957)
- Lawton, Oklahoma: Lawton Giants (1947–1951); Lawton Reds (1952–1953); Lawton Braves (1954–1957)
- McAlester, Oklahoma: McAlester Rockets (1947–1956)
- Muskogee, Oklahoma: Muskogee Giants (1955–1957)
- Paris, Texas: Paris Orioles (1955–1957)
- Pauls Valley, Oklahoma: Pauls Valley Raiders (1948–1954)
- Ponca City, Oklahoma: Ponca City Cubs (1955–1957)
- Seminole, Oklahoma: Seminole Oilers (1947–1949); Seminole Ironmen (1950–1951); Seminole Oilers (1954–1957)
- Shawnee, Oklahoma: Shawnee Hawks (1950–1957)
- Sherman, Texas & Denison, Texas: Sherman Twins (1952); Sherman-Denison Twins (1953)

== Standings & statistics ==
=== 1947 to 1952 ===
1947 Sooner State League

Team standings	W	L	PCT	GB	Attend	Managers
Lawton Giants	98	42	.700	–	24,248	Louis Brower
Ada Herefords	86	51	.628	10½	41,872	Uke Clanton
McAlester Rockets	73	67	.521	25	43,657	William Nebroak
Ardmore Indians	72	67	.518	25½	27,943	Dutch Prather
Seminole Oilers	48	90	.348	49	30,003	John Taber / Hugh Willingham
Duncan Cementers	39	99	.283	58	8,220	Otto Utt

Playoffs: Ardmore 3 games, Lawton 2; McAlester 3 games, Ada 2
Finals: McAlester 4 games, Ardmore 1.

Player statistics
Player	Team	Stat	Tot	Player	Team	Stat	Tot
Russell Hawley	McAlester	BA	.382	Forrest Smith	Ada	W	23
Robert Andrlik	Ardmore	Runs	158	William Donaghey	Ada	SO	244
A.B. Everett	McAlester	Hits	188	Forest Smith	Ada	ERA	2.00
Paul Richardville	Ada	RBI	111	Joseph Galioto	Lawton	PCT	.800 20–5
Howard Weeks	Lawton	HR	11				
Paul Richardville	Ada	HR	11				

1948 Sooner State League
1948 schedule

Team standings	W	L	PCT	GB	Attend	Managers
McAlester Rockets	91	47	.659	–	63,060	Vern Hoscheit
Lawton Giants	77	59	.566	13	33,861	Louis Brower
Seminole Oilers	75	62	.547	15½	40,053	Hugh Willingham
Chickasha Chiefs	73	63	.537	17	35,640	Ray Honeycutt
Ada Herefords	63	76	.453	28½	27,050	Uke Clanton
Ardmore Indians	60	78	.435	31	37,944	Donald Smith / Jim Cooke
Pauls Valley Raiders	56	81	.409	34½	27,071	Dutch Prather / Jennings Poindexter
Duncan Cementers	54	83	.394	36½	27,066	Jess Welch / Otto Utt

Playoffs: McAlester 3 games, Chickasha 1; Seminole 3 games, Lawton 2
Finals: Seminole 4 games, McAlester 2.

Player statistics
Player	Team	Stat	Tot	Player	Team	Stat	Tot
Cromer Smotherman	McAlester	BA	.347	Bob Giddings	Lawton	W	25
Bob Hyatt	Pauls Valley	Runs	122	Tom Kruta	Ardmore	SO	186
Al Billingsley	McAlester	Hits	190	Buddy Yount	McAlester	ERA	2.11
Howard Martin	McAlester	RBI	122	Buddy Yount	McAlester	PCT	.944; 17–1
Howard Martin	McAlester	HR	19				

1949 Sooner State League
1949 schedule

Team standings	W	L	PCT	GB	Attend	Managers
Pauls Valley Raiders	88	52	.629	–	61,085	Red Phillips
Lawton Giants	87	52	.626	½	45,501	Louis Brower
Chickasha Chiefs	78	61	.561	9½	59,306	Ray Honeycutt
Ada Herefords	69	70	.497	18½	33,525	Bill Krueger
Duncan Uttmen	65	74	.468	22½	36,678	Edward Marleau / James Skidgel/ Hosea Pfeiffer
McAlester Rockets	58	82	.414	30	56,733	Vern Hoscheit
Ardmore Indians	57	81	.413	30	43,348	Dutch Prather / James Skidgel
Seminole Oilers	54	84	.391	33	33,258	Hugh Willingham / Paul Schoendienst

Playoffs: Pauls Valley 3 games, Ada 2; Lawton 3 games, Chickasha 0
Finals: Lawton 4 games, Pauls Valley 1.

Player statistics
Player	Team	Stat	Tot	Player	Team	Stat	Tot
Pete Runnels	Chickasha	BA	.372	Jim Melton	Pauls Valley	W	23
Kelly Wingo	Chickasha	Runs	123	Joseph Micciche	Lawton	SO	297
Pete Runnels	Chickasha	Hits	188	James Spencer	Lawton	ERA	1.96
A.B. Pearson	Pauls Valley	RBI	123	Joseph Micciche	Lawton	PCT	.769; 20–6
Daryl Spencer	Pauls Valley	HR	23				
Bill Milligan	Ada	HR	23				

1950 Sooner State League

Team standings	W	L	PCT	GB	Attend	Managers
Ada Herefords	96	41	.701	–	31,981	Bill Krueger
McAlester Rockets	92	48	.657	5½	58,048	Vern Hoscheit
Chickasha Chiefs	80	59	.575	17	43,759	Ray Honeycutt
Ardmore Indians	75	65	.536	22½	44,454	Bennie Warren
Pauls Valley Raiders	68	72	.486	29½	25,848	Red Phillips / Joseph Jacobs
Seminole Ironmen	55	83	.399	41½	21,366	Kelly Wingo / Lloyd Giger / Dennis Rackley
Duncan Uttmen / Shawnee Hawks	51	85	.375	44½	15,950	Hosea Pfeiffer / Dutch Prather / Kelly Wingo
Lawton Giants	37	101	.268	59½	31,817	Louis Brower

Duncan moved to Shawnee August 18.
Playoffs: Ardmore 3 games, Ada 2; McAlester 3 games, Chickasha 0
Finals: McAlester 4 games, Ardmore 2.

Player statistics
Player	Team	Stat	Tot	Player	Team	Stat	Tot
Clinton Weaver	McAlester	BA	.378	William Donaghey	Ada	W	26
Ron Jackson	Ada	Runs	154	Jack Urban	McAlester	SO	279
Jack Taylor	McAlester	Hits	212	Jack Urban	McAlester	ERA	2.15
Stephen Molinari	Ada	RBI	162	Bill Starr	Ada	PCT	.917; 11–1
Stephen Molinari	Ada	HR	39				

1951 Sooner State League

Team standings	W	L	PCT	GB	Attend	Managers
Ardmore Indians	99	40	.712	–	40,742	Bennie Warren
Shawnee Hawks	96	44	.686	3½	44,428	Lou Fitzgerald
McAlester Rockets	91	48	.655	8	42,028	Vern Hoscheit
Pauls Valley Raiders	90	50	.643	9½	27,580	Louis Brower
Ada Herefords	54	86	.386	45½	12,779	Stan Galle
Chickasha Chiefs	46	94	.329	53½	21,107	Kelly Wingo / Jerry Jackson / Chet Bryan / William Reyes
Lawton Giants	46	94	.329	53½	17,252	Ray Baker
Seminole Ironmen	37	103	.264	62½	16,915	Ripper Collins / Dutch Prather

Playoffs: Ardmore 3 games, Pauls Valley 0; McAlester 3 games, Shawnee 0
Finals: McAlester 4 games, Ardmore 2.

Player statistics
Player	Team	Stat	Tot	Player	Team	Stat	Tot
Lou Fitzgerald	Shawnee	BA	.379	Dee Sanders	McAlester	W	27
Joe Nodar	Ardmore	Runs	179	Ken Hemphill	Pauls Valley	W	27
Dan Toma	Pauls Valley	Hits	195	Armin Somonte	Ardmore	SO	341
Manuel Temes	Ardmore	Hits	195	Dee Sanders	McAlester	ERA	1.67
Glenn Snyder	Ardmore	RBI	155	Dee Sanders	McAlester	PCT	.871; 27–4
Manuel Temes	Ardmore	RBI	155				
Dan Demby	Pauls Valley	HR	30				
Don Williamson	Pauls Valley	HR	30				

1952 Sooner State League

Team standings	W	L	PCT	GB	Attend	Managers
McAlester Rockets	87	53	.621	–	52,395	William Cope
Pauls Valley Raiders	80	59	.576	6½	34,500	Louis Brower
Chickasha Chiefs	78	62	.557	9	27,494	Ray Taylor
Shawnee Hawks	73	67	.521	14	44,680	Lou Fitzgerald / James Jolly
Sherman Twins	72	68	.514	15	19,815	Bennie Warren
Lawton Reds	63	77	.450	24	52,807	Tuck McWilliams
Ada Herefords	57	82	.410	29½	38,387	Bill Enos / Virl Loman / Jim England
Ardmore Indians	49	91	.350	38	24,362	Jackie Sullivan / Royce Mills / Hugh Willingham / Clyde Baldwin / Julian Morgan

Playoffs: McAlester 3 games, Shawnee 1; Pauls Valley 3 games, Chickasha 1
Finals: McAlester 4 games, Pauls Valley 3.

Player statistics
Player	Team	Stat	Tot	Player	Team	Stat	Tot
Ray Taylor	Chickasha	BA	.365	Charles Seymour	McAlester	W	25
Vincent Downs	Lawton	Runs	142	Charles Seymour	McAlester	SO	292
Jim England	Ada	Hits	198	Charles Seymour	McAlester	ERA	1.91
Don Williamson	Pauls Valley	RBI	148	Charles Seymour	McAlester	PCT	.806; 25–6
Bob Hertel	McAlester	HR	22				
Don Williamson	Pauls Valley	HR	22				

=== 1953 to 1955 ===
1953 Sooner State League

Team standings	W	L	PCT	GB	Attend	Managers
Ardmore Cardinals	91	46	.664	–	43,000	Bennie Warren
Shawnee Hawks	86	53	.619	6	39,441	Boyd Bartley
Ada Herefords	84	54	.609	7½	36,128	Louis Brower
McAlester Rockets	83	56	.597	9	40,485	William Cope
Pauls Valley Raiders	63	74	.460	28	18,453	Richard Klaus
Sherman-Denison Twins	61	77	.442	30½	18,784	Red McCarty
Lawton Reds	47	89	.346	43½	18,029	Tuck McWilliams
Gainesville Owls	36	102	.261	55½	20,523	James Grigg / Ernest Shadid / Jesse Landrum

Playoffs: McAlester 3 games, Ardmore 1; Ada 3 games, Shawnee 1
Finals: McAlester 4 games, Ada 1.

Player statistics
Player	Team	Stat	Tot	Player	Team	Stat	Tot
Russ Snyder	McAlester	BA	.432	J.L. Rhodes	Ada	W	21
Al Viotta	Ardmore	Runs	159	Don Huffman	Shawnee	SO	250
Russ Snyder	McAlester	Hits	240	James Peterson	Shawnee	ERA	1.94
Al Viotta	Ardmore	RBI	161	Robert Shipman	McAlester	PCT	.813; 13–3
Ron Slawski	Ada	HR	31				
Bob Norden	Ada	HR	31				

1954 Sooner State League

Team standings	W	L	PCT	GB	Attend	Managers
Shawnee Hawks	92	48	.657	–	42,189	Jack Banta
Lawton Braves	81	58	.583	10½	47,431	Travis Jackson
McAlester Rockets	76	64	.543	16	53,410	Bunny Mick
Ardmore Cardinals	72	67	.518	19½	31,090	Bennie Warren / Frank Mancuso
Gainesville Owls	72	68	.514	20	14,385	Richard Rigazio
Ada Herefords / Cementers	64	76	.457	28	28,482	Louis Brower / John Densmore
Seminole Oilers	61	79	.436	31	16,840	Tom Warren / Ray Taylor
Pauls Valley Raiders	41	99	.293	51	29,468	Lloyd Pearson / Bennie Warren

Playoffs: Ardmore 3 games, Shawnee 2; Lawton 3 games, McAlester 2
Finals: Lawton 4 games, Ardmore 0.

Player statistics
Player	Team	Stat	Tot	Player	Team	Stat	Tot
Ray Mitchell	Shawnee	BA	.371	Wendell Doss	Lawton	W	24
Bill Fox	Shawnee	Runs	139	Joe Roberson	Shawnee	SO	225
Bill Fox	Shawnee	Hits	193	Joe Roberson	Shawnee	ERA	2.52
Jim Humbert	Shawnee	RBI	136	Tom Warren	Seminole	PCT	.909 10–1
Gene Green	Ardmore	HR	34				

1955 Sooner State League

Team standings	W	L	PCT	GB	Attend	Managers
Lawton Braves	95	44	.683	–	45,554	Travis Jackson
Shawnee Hawks	77	61	.558	17½	37,817	Jack Banta
Muskogee Giants	74	66	.529	21½	47,485	Richard Klaus
Paris Orioles	68	69	.496	26	44,805	Jimmy Adair
Ardmore Cardinals	65	75	.464	30½	33,731	Frank Mancuso
McAlester Rockets	65	75	.464	30½	47,295	Marvin Crater
Gainesville Owls / Ponca City Cubs	56	83	.403	39	26,169	Eddie Carnett
Seminole Oilers	56	83	.403	39	26,775	Charles Hopkins / Al Evans

Gainesville moved to Ponca City May 19.
Playoffs: Lawton 3 games, Paris 1; Muskogee 3 games, Shawnee 2
Finals: Lawton 4 games, Muskogee 2.

Player statistics
Player	Team	Stat	Tot	Player	Team	Stat	Tot
Hal Gordon	Seminole	BA	.345	Bob Dudley	Lawton	W	23
William Caye	Muskogee	Runs	117	Dale Hendrickson	Lawton	SO	256
Walt Massefski	Paris	Hits	178	Dale Hendrickson	Lawton	ERA	1.26
Walt Massefski	Paris	RBI	107	Mike Kirmer	Lawton	PCT	.813 13–3
James Brown	Ardmore	HR	21				

=== 1956 to 1957 ===
1956 Sooner State League
1956 schedule

Team standings	W	L	PCT	GB	Attend	Managers
Ardmore Cardinals	83	56	.597	–	47,110	J.C. Dunn
Lawton Braves	80	60	.571	3½	30,550	Travis Jackson
Seminole Oilers	74	66	.529	9½	31,249	Burl Storie
Paris Orioles	72	67	.518	11	37,764	Jimmy Adair / Barney Lutz
Ponca City Cubs	70	70	.500	13½	20,674	Don Biebel
Muskogee Giants	63	76	.453	20	37,983	Richard Klaus
McAlester Rockets	60	79	.432	23	32,302	Marvin Crater
Shawnee Hawks	56	84	.400	27½	24,872	Jack Banta

Playoffs: Ardmore 3 games, Paris 2; Seminole 3 games, Lawton 1
Finals: Seminole 4 games, Ardmore 3.

Player statistics
Player	Team	Stat	Tot	Player	Team	Stat	Tot
Russell Gragg	Ponca City	BA	.352	John Bartek	Ardmore	W	21
Robert Stangel	Ardmore	Runs	132	Vincent Kilpela	Ardmore	SO	276
Russell Gragg	Ponca City	Hits	183	[ Mike Mazzamorra	Seminole	ERA	2.28
J.C. Dunn	Ardmore	RBI	134	John Bartek	Ardmore	PCT	.778 21-6
Gene Oliver	Ardmore	HR	39	Mike Mazzamorra	Seminole	PCT	.778 21–6

1957 Sooner State League
1957 schedule

Team standings	W	L	PCT	GB	Attend	Managers
Paris Orioles	74	51	.592	–	33,953	Barney Lutz / Bill Capps
Ardmore Cardinals	74	52	.587	½	36,201	J.C. Dunn / Mike Ryba
Muskogee Giants	71	55	.563	3½	21,253	Andy Gilbert
Shawnee Hawks	64	62	.508	10½	22,301	Ed Serrano
Greenville Majors	62	63	.496	12	23,066	Tom Gott
Lawton Braves	59	66	.472	15	15,065	Travis Jackson
Ponca City Cubs	52	74	.413	22½	21,253	Don Biebel
Seminole Oilers	46	79	.368	28	17,379	Lee Anthony

Playoffs: Paris 3 games, Shawnee 1; Ardmore 3 games, Muskogee 0
Finals: Ardmore 4 games, Paris 0.

Player statistics
Player	Team	Stat	Tot	Player	Team	Stat	Tot
Jim McKnight	Ardmore	BA	.340	Jack Curtis	Ponca City	W	18
Dick Simpson	Paris	Runs	116	Jack Curtis	Ponca City	SO	219
Dick Simpson	Paris	Hits	163	John Jeanes	Paris	ERA	2.41
Jim McKnight	Ardmore	RBI	112	Rudy Stoehr	Greenville	PCT	.750 12–4
Bob Beattie	Paris	HR	25				

== Hall of Fame alumni ==
- Whitey Herzog, 1949–1950 McAlester Rockets
- Travis Jackson, 1954–1957 Manager Lawton Braves
- Billy Williams, 1956–1957 Ponca City Cubs
