= Seminole Oilers =

Seminole Orioles
- 1947–1957; (1947–1951, 1954–1957); Seminole, Oklahoma

Minor league affiliations
- Class: Class D (1947–1951, 1954–1957)
- League: Sooner State League (1947–1951, 1954–1957)

Major league affiliations
- Team: Chicago White Sox (1948–1949); Kansas City A's (1955–1957)

Minor league titles
- League titles (2): 1948; 1956
- Wild card berths (2): 1948; 1956

Team data
- Name: Seminole Oilers (1947–1949); Seminole Ironmen (1950–1951); Seminole Oilers (1954–1957)
- Ballpark: Oiler Park (1947–1951, 1954–1957)

The Seminole Oilers were a minor league baseball team based in Seminole, Oklahoma. Between 1947 and 1957, Seminole teams played exclusively as members of the Class D level Sooner State League from 1947 to 1951 and 1954 to 1957, winning league championships in 1948 and 1956. The Oilers and Seminole Ironmen hosted minor league home games at Oiler Park.

The Seminole Oilers played as a minor league affiliate of the Chicago White Sox from 1948 to 1949 and the Kansas City A's from 1955 to 1957.

== History ==
=== 1947 to 1951 ===
Minor league baseball began in Seminole, Oklahoma with the 1947 Seminole Oilers. The Oilers became charter members of the six–team, Class D level Sooner State League, joining the Ada Herefords, Ardmore Indians, Duncan Cementers, Lawton Giants and McAlester Rockets in beginning league play on April 29, 1947.

In their first season of play, the 1947 Seminole Oilers placed 5th in the Sooner State League standings with a record of 48–90. Playing under managers John Taber and Hugh Willingham, the Oilers finished 49.0 games behind the 1st place Lawton Giants. Playing home games at Oiler Park, Seminole's home attendance for the 1947 season was 30,003, an average of 435 per game.

The Seminole Oilers won the 1948 Sooner State League Championship. Seminole became an affiliate of the Chicago White Sox and finished the regular season with a 75–62 record, placing 3rd in the regular season standings under manager Hugh Willingham. The Sooner State League, expanded to eight teams, with the addition of the Chickasha Chiefs and the Pauls Valley Raiders. In the 1948 Sooner State League playoffs, the Seminole Oilers defeated the Lawton Giants 3 games to 2. In the Finals, Seminole defeated the McAlester Rockets 4 games to 2 to win the championship. The Oilers drew 40,053 in attendance for the season.

Remaining as an affiliate of the Chicago White Sox, the 1949 Seminole Oilers finished last in the Sooner State League. With a 54–84 record under managers Hugh Willingham and Paul Shoendienst, Seminole placed 8th and finished 33.0 games behind the 1st place Pauls Valley Raiders. The Oilers drew 33,258 fans to Oiler Park.

In 1950, Seminole continued Sooner State League play as the Seminole Ironmen. The 1950 Ironmen finished in 6th place with a 55–83 record, playing the season under managers Kelly Wingo, Lloyd Giger and Dennis Rackley. With Seminole drawing 21,366 for the 1950 season, the Ironmen finished 41.5 games behind the 1st place Ada Herefords. The 1951 Seminole Ironmen finished last in the league. Placing 8th with a 37–103 record, Seminole finished 62.5 games behind the 1st place Ardmore Indians under managers James "Ripper" Collins and Dutch Prather. The franchise drew 16,915 for the season. Following the 1951 season, the Seminole franchise was replaced by the Sherman Twins in the 1952 Sooner State League.

=== 1954 to 1957 ===
Seminole returned to the eight–team Sooner State League in 1954. The Seminole "Oilers" returned and finished with a 61–79 record under managers Tommy Warren and Ray Taylor. The Oilers finished in 7th place, finishing 31.0 games behind the 1st place Shawnee Hawks in the final standings. Seminole had total season attendance of 16,840.

The 1955 Seminole Oilers became an affiliate of the Kansas City Athletics. The 1955 Seminole Oilers finished 7th in the Sooner State League standings, with a 56–83 record. Under managers Charles Hopkins and Al Evans, Seminole finished 39.0 games behind the 1st place Lawton Braves. The Seminole season attendance was 26,775 in 1955.

The Seminole Oilers won their second franchise championship in 1956, staging a move from last place at mid season. Under manager Burl Storie, the Oilers rallied from 8th place to place 3rd in the Sooner State League regular season standings with a 74–66 record. The team was in last place on the 4th of July before making the playoffs and winning the title. The 1956 team was nicknamed the "Miracle Oilers" for their feats. In the 1956 playoffs, the Seminole Oilers defeated the Lawton Braves 3 games to 1, to advance. In the Finals, Seminole defeated the Ardmore Cardinals 4 games to 3 to win the 1956 Sooner State League Championship. Attendance was 31,249, an average of 446 per game.

1957 was the final season for the Seminole franchise, as the league permanently folded following the season. The Sooner State League, now under the direction of league President George Barr, a former major league umpire, played its final season. The 1957 Oilers finished last in the league. With a 46–79 record, the Oilers finished in 8th place in the league, 28 games behind the Paris Orioles playing under manager Lee Anthony. In their final season, Seminole had season attendance of 17,379.

Seminole folded along with the Sooner State League after the season. Seminole has not hosted another minor league team.

== The ballpark ==
Seminole teams were noted to have played minor league home games at Oiler Park. Oiler Park was also called "Municipal Park" and "Ironmen Park". The ballpark had a capacity of 2,200 in 1948 and 3,000 in 1955. Oiler Park is still in use today as the home field for Seminole State College teams. It is part of a public park that is still referred to as Municipal Park. The address is 1510 Lloyd Simmons Boulevard. The road next to the ballpark is named after Lloyd Simmons, the record-setting former Seminole State College baseball coach who was inducted into the National Junior College Hall of Fame in 1997.

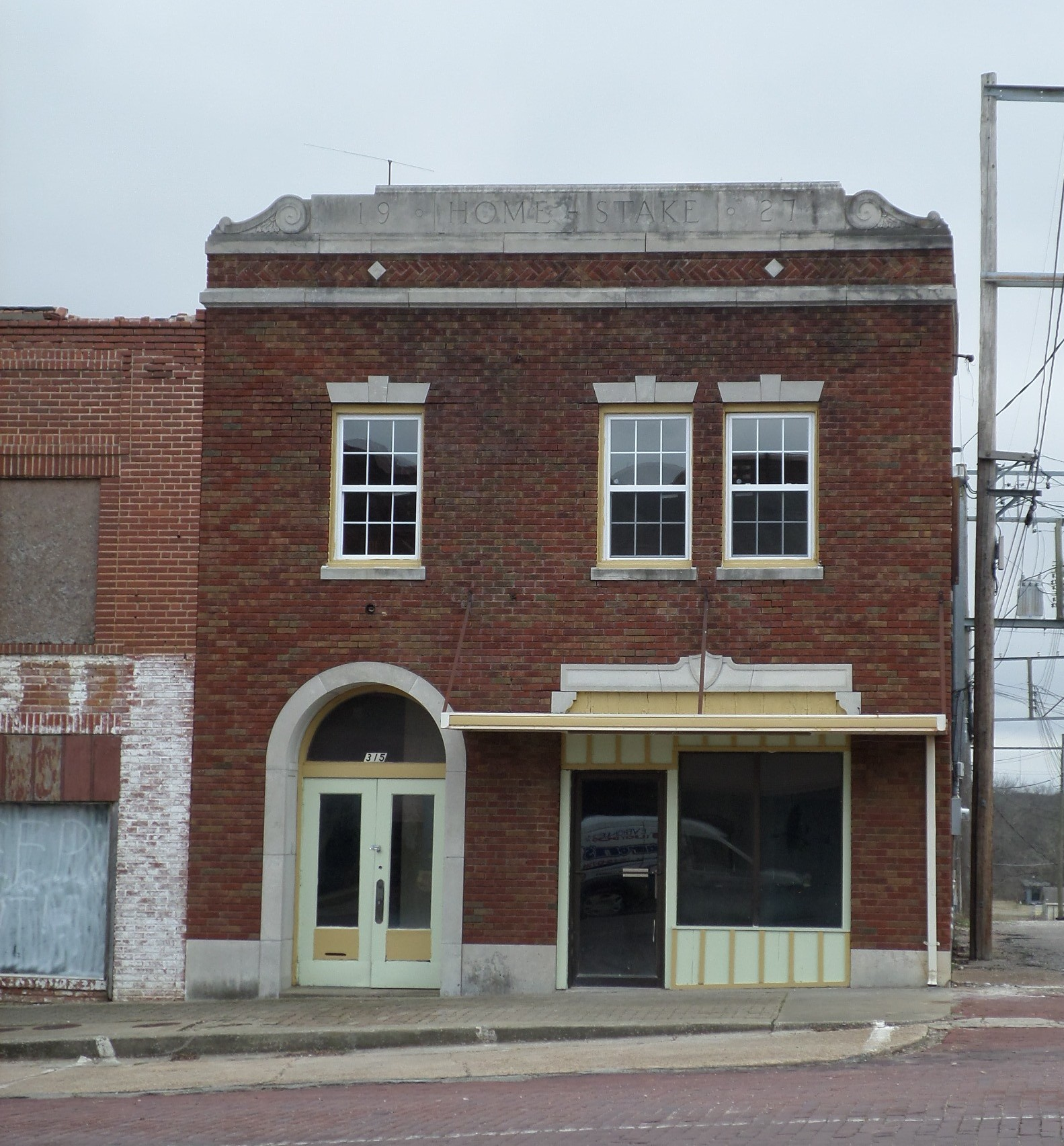
(2014) Home Stake building. National Register of Historic Places. Seminole, Oklahoma

== Timeline ==
Year(s)	# Yrs.	Team	Level	League	Affiliate	Ballpark
1947	1	Seminole Oilers	Class D	Sooner State League	None	Oiler Park
1949–1949	2	Seminole Oilers	Class D	Sooner State League	Chicago White Sox	Oiler Park
1950–1951	2	Seminole Ironmen	Class D	Sooner State League	None	Oiler Park
1954–1957	4	Seminole Oilers	Class D	Sooner State League	Kansas City Athletics	Oiler Park

== Season–by–season ==
Year	Record	Manager	Finish	Playoffs/Notes
1947	48–90	John Taber / Hugh Willingham	5th	Did not qualify
1948	75–52	Hugh Willingham	3rd	League champions
1949	54–84	Hugh Willingham / Paul Shoendienst	8th	Did not qualify
1950	55–83	Kelly Wingo / Lloyd Giger / Dennis Rackley	6th	Did not qualify
1951	37–103	"Rip" Collins / Charles Stumborg / Dutch Prather	8th	Did not qualify
1954	61–79	Tommy Warren / Ray Taylor	7th	Did not qualify
1955	56–83	Charles Hopkins / Al Evans	7th	Did not qualify
1956	74–66	Burl Storie	3rd	League champions
1957	46–79	Lee Anthony	8th	Did not qualify

== Notable alumni ==
- George Brunet (1954–1955) Mexican Professional Baseball Hall of Fame
- Cal Dorsett (1951)
- Al Evans (1955, MGR)
- Alex George (1957)
- Len Gilmore (1951)
- Hal Jones (1956)
- Jerry McKinnis (1956–1957)
- Paul Shoendienst (1949, MGR)
- John Taber (1947, MGR)
- Tommy Warren (1954, MGR)
- Don Williams (1956)
- Hugh Willingham (1947–1949, MGR)
- Joe Wood (1947)
- Seminole Oilers players
- Seminole Ironmen players
