= Pauls Valley Raiders =

Pauls Valley, Raiders
- 1948–1954; Pauls Valley, Oklahoma

Minor league affiliations
- Class: Class D (1948–1954)
- League: Sooner State League (1948–1954)

Major league affiliations
- Team: New York Giants (1952–1953)

Minor league titles
- League titles (0): None
- Conference titles (1): 1949
- Wild card berths (2): 1951; 1952

Team data
- Name: Pauls Valley Raiders (1948–1954)
- Ballpark: Wacker Park (1948–1954)

The Pauls Valley Raiders were a minor league baseball team based in Pauls Valley, Oklahoma. From 1948 to 1954, the Valley Raiders played exclusively as members of the Class D level Sooner State League, winning the 1949 pennant. The Raiders hosted home games at Wacker Park. The Pauls Valley Raiders were a minor league affiliate of the New York Giants in 1952 and 1953.

== History ==
Minor league baseball began in Pauls Valley, Oklahoma when the 1948 Pauls Valley "Raiders" became members of the Sooner State League. In the league's second year of play, the league expanded from six–teams in 1947, to eight–teams in 1948. The Pauls Valley Raiders and Chickasha Chiefs were the 1948 expansion teams. The other six Sooner State League teams in 1948 were the Ada Herefords, Ardmore Indians, Duncan Cementers, Lawton Giants, McAlester Rockets and Seminole Oilers.

In their first season of play, the Pauls Valley Raiders finished with a 56–81 record to place seventh in 1948. The season home attendance was 27,671, an average of 404 per game. Pauls Valley native and former MLB player Jennings Poindexter managed the Raiders for part of the 1948 season.

The 1949 Pauls Valley Raiders captured the Sooner State League pennant. The Raiders finished the regular season in first place with an 88–52 record. In the playoffs, the Pauls Valley Raiders defeated the Ada Herefords 3 games to 2, In the Finals, the Lawton Giants defeated Pauls Valley 4 games to 1. Home attendance was 61,085, an average of 873.

In 1950, Pauls Valley finished with a 68–72 record to place fifth and did not quality for the playoffs. The team drew 25,848 for the season.

The 1951 Pauls Valley Raiders won 90 games and were 40 games above .500, but still finished fourth in the league standings. The Ardmore Indians (99–40), Shawnee Hawks (96–44) and McAlester Rockets (91–48) finished ahead of the Pauls Valley Raiders (90–50). In the playoffs, the Ardmore Indians swept Pauls Valley Raiders in 3 games. Pauls Valley drew 27,580.

The franchise became an affiliate of the New York Giants in 1952 and Pauls Valley advanced to the Sooner State League finals. The Raiders finished 80–59 (2nd) in the regular season, 6.5 games behind the McAlester Rockets. In the playoffs, Pauls Valley defeated the Chickasha Chiefs 3 games to 1 in the semi-finals. In the Finals, the McAlester Rockets and Pauls Valley Raiders went 7 games, with McAlester winning the 7th game for a 4 games to 3 series win. Pauls Valley season attendance was 34,500.

The Raiders missed the playoffs in 1953 and 1954. Pauls Valley finished 63–74 (fifth place) in 1953, drawing 18,453 (seventh in the league) in their final season as a New York Giants affiliate.

In 1954, The Pauls Valley Raiders finished last (eighth) in their final season with a 41–99 record, finishing 51 games out of first and 20 games out of seventh. The 1954 Raiders drew 29,058 (fifth).

The Pauls Valley Raiders permanently folded after the 1954 season, as did the Ada Cementers franchise. They two teams were replaced in the 1955 Sooner State League by the Paris Orioles and Muskogee Giants.

Pauls Valley has not hosted another minor league team.

== The ballpark ==
The Pauls Valley Raiders hosted home games at Wacker Park. Today, Wacker Park is still in existence as a public park and the Pauls Valley High School football team plays games at "Thompson Field", located within Wacker Park. Thompson Field hosts the annual "Watermelon Seed Spittin' World Championship" on the 4th of July.

== Season–by–season ==
Year	Record	Manager	Finish	Playoffs/Notes
1948	56–71	Dutch Prather / Jinx Poindexter	7th	Did not qualify
1949	88–52	Clarence Phillips	1st	Lost league finals
1950	68–71	Clarence Phillips / Joseph Jacobs	5th	Did not qualify
1951	90–50	Louis Brower	4th	Lost 1st round
1952	80–59	Louis Brower	2nd	Lost league finals
1953	63–74	Richard Klaus	5th	Did not qualify
1954	41–99	Lloyd Pearson / Bennie Warren	8th	Did not qualify

== Notable alumni ==
- Louis Brower (1951–1952, MGR)
- Roy Hawes (1948–1949)
- Bob Johnson (1954)
- Dutch McCall (1953)
- Red Phillips (1949–1950, MGR)
- Jennings Poindexter(1948, MGR)
- Daryl Spencer (1949)
- Bennie Warren (1954, MGR)
- Dom Zanni (1952)
- Pauls Valley Raiders players
