= Ada Herefords =

- 1947–1954; Ada, Oklahoma

Minor league affiliations
- Class: Class D (1947–1954)
- League: Sooner State League (1947–1954)

Major league affiliations
- Team: St. Louis Browns (1947–1953); Baltimore Orioles (1954)

Minor league titles
- League titles (0): None
- Conference titles (1): 1950
- Wild card berths (3): 1947; 1949; 1953

Team data
- Name: Ada Cementers (1954); Ada Sooner States (1954); Ada Herefords (1947–1954)
- Ballpark: Hereford Park (1947–1954)

The Ada Herefords was a minor league baseball team based in Ada, Oklahoma. From 1947 to 1954, the Herefords played exclusively as a member of the Class D level Sooner State League, winning the league pennant in 1950.

The Herefords were a minor league affiliate of the St. Louis Browns from 1947 to 1953 and remained an affiliate when St. Louis relocated to become the Baltimore Orioles in 1954.

The Ada Herefords hosted minor league home games at Hereford Park in Ada, Oklahoma.

== History ==
Minor league baseball began in Ada, Oklahoma with the 1947 Ada Herefords. The Ada Herefords were charter members of the six–team Sooner State League in 1947, joining the Ardmore Indians, Duncan Cementers, Lawton Giants, McAlester Rockets and Seminole Oilers in league play.

In their first season of league play, the 1947 Ada Herefords placed second in the Sooner State League with an 86–51 record in the regular season, playing as an affiliate of the St. Louis Browns. They would remain an affiliate of the Browns franchise throughout their existence. Ada finished 10.5 games behind the first place Lawton Giants, while playing the season under manager Uke Clanton. In the 1947 playoffs, the McAlester Rockets defeated the Ada Herefords 3 games to 2. Paul Richardville of Ada led the Sooner State League with both 11 home runs and 111 RBI. His Ada teammate, pitcher Forest Smith led the league with both 23 wins and a 2.47 ERA and William Donaghey led the league with 244 strikeouts. The Ada home season attendance was 41,872, an average of 611 per game.

The 1948 Sooner State League expanded to eight teams. Ada finished with a 63–76 record, placing 5th in the 1948 Sooner State League regular season standings, playing under returning manager Uke Clanton. The Herefords did not qualify for the playoffs, finishing the season 28.5 games behind the 1st place McAlester Rockets. The Sooner State League expanded from six–teams to eight–teams, adding the Chickasha Chiefs and Pauls Valley Raiders as expansion teams. The Ada season attendance in 1948 was 27,050.

The Ada Herefords made the Sooner State League playoffs in 1949. Ada finished with a 69–70 record and in 4th place in the regular season standings, finishing 18.5 games behind the 1st place Pauls Valley Raiders, playing under manager Bill Krueger. In the playoffs, the Pauls Valley Raiders defeated Ada 3 games to 2. Ada player Bill Milligan led the Sooner State League with 23 home runs. Season attendance at Hereford Park was 33,525.

In 1950, Ada captured the Sooner State League pennant, playing under returning manager Bill Krueger. The Ada Herefords finished the regular season in first place 1st with a 96–41 record, ending the season 5.5 games ahead of 2nd place McAlester Rockets. In the 1950 playoffs, the Ardmore Indians defeated Ada 3 games to 2. Stephen Molinari of Ava led the Sooner State League with 39 home runs and 163 RBI, while teammate William Donaghey led the league with 23 wins. Season attendance was 31,981.

The 1951 Ada Herefords did not qualify for the Sooner State League playoffs, finishing in 5th place. The Herefords ended with a 54–86 record in the regular season, playing under manager Stan Galle and finishing 45.5 games behind the 1st place Ardmore Indians. Attendance was 12,779, an average of 183 per game.

Ada missed the playoffs in 1952, as the Herefords finished in 7th place with a 57–82 record. Former manager Uke Clanton became president of the Sooner State League, a position he would hold for the remainder of the league's play. Playing under managers Bill Enos, Virl Loman and Jim England, the Herefords finished 29.5 games behind the 1st place McAlester Rockets in the eight–team league. McAlester drew 38,387 to Hereford Park for the season.

The 1953 Ada Herefords advanced to the Sooner State League Finals. Ada finished with an 84–54 record, placing 3rd in the regular season standings. Ada played under manager Louis Browner and finished 7.5 games behind the Ardmore Cardinals. In the 1953 playoffs, Ada had their first and only playoff series victory, as the Ada Herefords defeated the Shawnee Hawks 3 games to 1 in the semi-finals. In the Finals, the McAlester Rockets defeated Ada 4 games to 1 and captured the championship. Ava players Ron Slawski and Bob Norden tied for the Sooner State League lead in home runs with 31 each and teammate J.L. Rhodes led the league with 21 wins. Ada's season attendance was 36,128.

Ada played their final minor league season in 1954. Attendance was poor, averaging 300–350 people a game after Opening Day. On July 31st, the team was unable to make payroll, the franchise was surrendered to the league and Baltimore cancelled its working agreement with the team. The league operated the team for two days as the Ada Sooner States until an owner of a local cementing firm, Charles Mayfield, acquired the team and changed the name to the Ada Cementers. He blamed the working agreement with the Browns/Orioles for the Ada club's troubles, and because of this, both Mayfield and Ada were blacklisted by the major leagues as a whole. The 1954 Ada Herefords/Cementers ended the Sooner State League regular season in 6th place with a 64–76 record, playing under managers Louis Brower and John Densmore, finishing 28.0 games behind the Shawnee Hawks. Ada drew 28,482 fans for home games, an average of 410 per game. The franchise was returned to the league on December 26 after they failed to secure a working agreement with another major league club during the 1954 Winter Meetings.

Ada's fellow league member, the Pauls Valley Raiders, folded also. Ada and Pauls Valley were replaced in the 1955 Sooner State League by the Muskogee Giants and Paris Orioles.

Ada, Oklahoma has not hosted another minor league team.

== The ballpark ==
The Ada minor league teams were noted to have played minor league home games at Hereford Park. The ballpark was located at the Pontotoc County fairgrounds on North Broadway Avenue. The field had an unusual asymmetrical shape: dimensions were 275 feet to right field, 295 feet to center, and 428 to left. This was due to the park also hosting the Ada Rodeo, which at one time was the second largest outdoor rodeo behind only Cheyenne Frontier Days. The Pontotoc County Agri-Plex and Convention Center, now stands on the site.

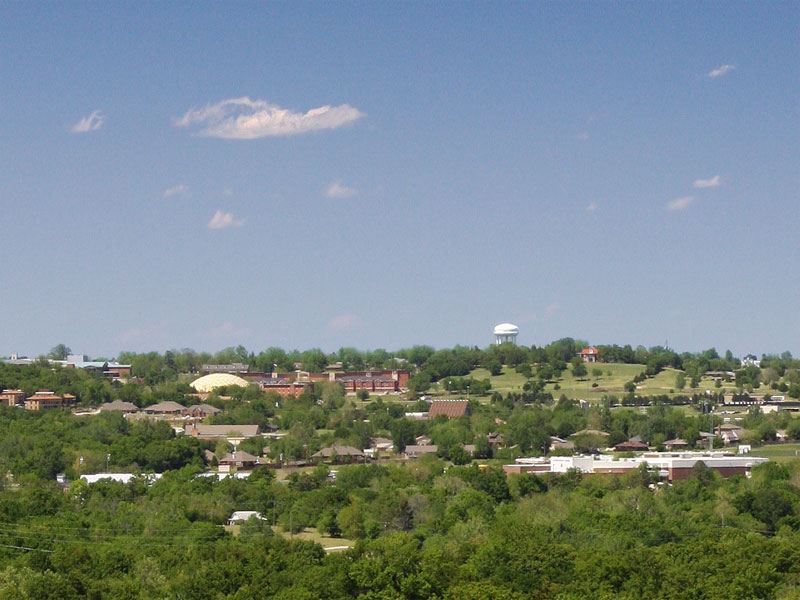
(2014) Ada, Oklahoma

== Timeline ==
Year(s)	# Yrs.	Team	Level	League	Affiliate
1947–1954	8	Ada Herefords	Class D	Sooner State League	St. Louis Browns
1954	0.5	Ada Cementers	Class D	Sooner State League	Baltimore Orioles

== Season–by–season ==
Year	Record	Manager	Finish	Playoffs/Notes
1947	86–51	Uke Clanton	2nd	Lost in First Round
1948	63–76	Uke Clanton	5th	Did not qualify
1949	69–70	Bill Krueger	4th	Lost in First Round
1950	96–41	Bill Krueger	1st	Lost in First Round
1951	54–56	Stan Galle	5th	Did not qualify
1952	57–82	Bill Enos / Virl Loman; Jim England	7th	Did not qualify
1953	84–54	Louis Brower	3rd	Lost League Finals
1954	64–76	Louis Browerr / John Densmore	6th	Did not qualify

== Notable alumni ==
- Louis Brower (1953–1954, MGR)
- Uke Clanton (1947–1948, MGR)
- Stan Galle (1951, MGR)
- Charlie Rabe (1952)
- Woody Smith (1949)
- Bill Upton (1948)
- Jim Walton (1954)
- Joe Wood (1947) (son of Smoky Joe Wood)
- Ada Herefords players

== External references ==
- Baseball Reference
