= Lawton, Oklahoma minor league baseball history =

Lawton, Oklahoma minor league baseball teams
- 1911–1947; (1911, 1947–1957); Lawton, Oklahoma

Minor league affiliations
- Class: Class D (1911, 1947–1957)
- League: Texas-Oklahoma League (1911); Sooner State League (1947–1957)

Major league affiliations
- Team: New York Giants (1947–1951); Cincinnati Reds (1952–1953); Milwaukee Braves (1954–1957)

Minor league titles
- League titles (3): 1949; 1954; 1955
- Conference titles (2): 1947; 1955
- Wild card berths (4): 1948; 1949; 1954; 1956

Team data
- Name: Lawton Medicine Men (1911); Lawton Giants (1947–1951); Lawton Reds (1952–1953); Lawton Braves (1954–1957)
- Ballpark: Koehler Park (1911); Memorial Park (1947–1957)

Minor league baseball teams were based in Lawton, Oklahoma in 1911 and from 1947 to 1957. Lawton teams played as a member of the Texas-Oklahoma League in 1911 and the Sooner State League from 1947 to 1957, winning league championships in 1949, 1954 and 1955. Lawton was a minor league affiliate of the Milwaukee Braves from 1954 to 1957, Cincinnati Reds in 1952 and 1953 and the New York Giants from 1947 to 1951. Lawton hosted home minor league games at Koehler Park in 1911 and Memorial Park from 1947 to 1957.

Baseball Hall of Fame member Travis Jackson managed the Lawton Braves from 1954 to 1957.

== History ==
Lawton first hosted minor league baseball in 1911, when the city briefly hosted a team in the Texas-Oklahoma League. The Lawton Medicine Men had a 17–31 record when the Lawton franchise folded on June 14, 1911.

Lawton next played in the Class D level Sooner State League in 1947. Lawton remained in the league from 1947 to 1957. Lawton teams played as affiliates of the Milwaukee Braves (1954–1957), Cincinnati Reds (1952–1953) and New York Giants (1947–1951). Lawton took the moniker of their affiliates in each case. Lawton won Kansas-Oklahoma-Missouri League championships in 1949, 1954 and 1955. The 1954 and 1955 Lawton Braves championship teams were managed by Baseball Hall of Fame inductee Travis Jackson.The Sooner State League folded after the 1957 season.

In their first season of play, the 1947 Lawton Giants won the league pennant. The Giants ended the regular season with a 98–42 record, finishing 10.5 games ahead of the second place Ada Herefords before losing in the playoffs. In the playoffs, the Ardmore Indians defeated the Giants 3 games to 2.

In 1949, the Lawton Giants won the Sooner State League championship. Lawton placed second in the regular season standings with a 87–52 record, finishing 0.5 games behind the first place Pauls Valley Raiders. In the playoffs, Lawton swept the Chickasha Chiefs in three games to advance. In the Finals, Lawton defeated Pauls Valley 4 games to 1 to claim the championship. Manager Louis Brower led Lawton to the title.

In 1954, Baseball Hall of Fame member Travis Jackson, managed the Lawton Braves to their second Sooner State League championship in the eight–team league. Lawton finished the regular season in second place with an 81–58 record, finishing 10.5 games behind the Shawnee Hawks. In the first round of the playoffs, Lawton defeated the McAlester Rockets 3 games to 2 to advance. In the Finals, the Braves defeated the Ardmore Cardinals 3 games to 2, winning the championship.

The Lawton Braves defended their Sooner State League championship in 1955, winning the league pennant in the process. Managed by the returning Travis Jackson, the Braves ended the regular season with a 95–44 record to win the pennant and finish 17.5 games ahead of the second place Shawnee Hawks in the eight–team league. In the first round of the playoffs, Lawton defeated the Paris Orioles 3 games to 1. In the Finals, the Braves defeated the Muskogee Giants 4 games to 2 to win their second consecutive league title.

Following the completion of the 1957 season, the Sooner State League permanently folded.

Lawton, Oklahoma has not hosted another minor league baseball team.

== The ballparks ==
In 1911, Lawton played at home games at Koehler Park. Koehler Park was located between S.W. A and C Avenues on the north and south and S.W. 14th and 15th Streets on the east and west in Lawton, Oklahoma.

The 1947 to 1957 Lawton teams played home games at Memorial Park. The ballpark had a capacity of 3,600 (1947) and 2,000 (1953). Over their final four seasons, Lawton's season attendance had dropped from 47,000 in 1954 to 15,000 by 1957. The ballpark was located at 17th and G Streets, S.W., in the area that is now called Ahlschlager Park.

== Timeline ==
Year(s)	# Yrs.	Team	Level	League	Affiliate	Ballpark
1911	1	Lawton Medicine Men	Class D	Texas-Oklahoma League	None	Koehler Park.
1947–1951	5	Lawton Giants	Class D	Sooner State League	New York Giants	Memorial Park
1952–1953	2	Lawton Reds	Class D	Sooner State League	Cincinnati Reds	Memorial Park
1954–1957	4	Lawton Braves	Class D	Sooner State League	Milwaukee Braves	Memorial Park

== Season–by–season records ==
Year	Record	Win–loss %	Manager	Finish	Playoffs/Notes
1911	17–31	.366	Clyde Pinkerton	NA	Team folded June 14
1947	98–42	.700	Louis Brower	1st	Lost 1st round
1948	77–59	.566	Louis Brower	2nd	Lost 1st round
1949	87–52	.625	Louis Brower	2nd	League champions
1950	37–101	.268	Louis Brower	8th	Did not qualify
1951	46–94	.328	Ray Baker	7th	Did not qualify
1952	63–77	.450	Tuck McWilliams	6th	Did not qualify
1953	47–59	.443	Tuck McWilliams	7th	Did not qualify
1954	81–58	.582	Travis Jackson	2nd	League champions
1955	95–44	.683	Travis Jackson	1st	League champions
1956	80–60	.571	Travis Jackson	2nd	Lost 1st round
1957	59–66	.472	Travis Jackson	6th	Did not qualify

== Notable alumni ==
- Travis Jackson (1954–1957, MGR) Inducted Baseball Hall of Fame, 1982
- Ed Albrecht (1947)
- Marv Blaylock (1948)
- Louis Brower (1947–1950, player/MGR)
- Bob Harrison (1948–1949)
- Bobby Knoop (1957) MLB All-Star; Angels Hall of Fame
- Ron Piche (1955)
- Charlie Rabe (1952)
- Ron Samford (1948)
- Lawton Giants players
- Lawton Reds players
