= Chickasha Chiefs =

- 1948–1952; Chickasha, Oklahoma

Minor league affiliations
- Class: Class D (1948–1952)
- League: Sooner State League (1948–1952)

Major league affiliations
- Team: None

Minor league titles
- League titles (0): None
- Wild card berths (4): 1948; 1949; 1950; 1952

Team data
- Name: Chickasha Chiefs (1948–1952)
- Ballpark: Borden Park (1948–1952)

The Chickasha Chiefs were a minor league baseball team based in Chickasha, Oklahoma. The Chiefs played as members of the Class D level Sooner State League from 1948 to 1952, qualifying for the league playoffs on four occasions. The Chiefs teams hosted minor league home games at Borden Park.

== History ==
The Chiefs were immediately preceded in minor league baseball play by the 1922, the Chickasha Chicks, who won a championship in their final season of pay in the Oklahoma State League. The franchise folded following the season.

In 1948, the Chickasha Chiefs began play in the Class D level Sooner State League. The Chiefs and Pauls Valley Raiders were expansion teams in the league as it expanded from six to eight teams after forming in 1947. The other 1948 Sooner State League members were the Ada Herefords, Ardmore Indians, Duncan Cementers, Lawton Giants, McAlester Rockets and Seminole Oilers.

Chickasha qualified for the Sooner State League playoffs in 1948. The Chicks finished 73–63, placing fourth in the regular season standings. In the playoffs, the McAlester Rockets defeated the Chickasha Chiefs three games to one. The Chiefs 1948 attendance was 35,640, an average of 524 per game.

Returning to the playoffs in 1949, the Chickasha Chicks finished the regular season with a 78–61 record, placing third in the regular season. In the 1949 playoffs, the Lawton Giants defeated Chickasha three games to none. The Chicks 1949 attendance was 59,306, an average of 853.

The 1950 Chickasha Chiefs finished 80–59, to again place third in the Sooner State League regular season. Qualifying for the playoffs, the McAlester Rockets defeated the Chiefs three games to none. The 1950 season attendance was 43,759 (3rd in the league).

In 1951, the Chickasha Chiefs used five managers in placing seventh and finishing with a 46–94 record in the Sooner State League. The 1951 season attendance was 21,107.

The Chickasha Chiefs returned to the Sooner State League playoffs in 1952. The Chiefs finished 78–62, placing third in the 1952 regular season standings. In the playoffs, the Pauls Valley Raiders defeated the Chickasha Chiefs three games to one. Season attendance was 27,494, an average of 393 per game.

In February 1953, the Chiefs were bought by a new owner and then promptly moved to Gainesville, Texas that same month, where they played as the Gainesville Owls. Chickasha has not hosted another minor league team.

== The ballpark ==
The Chickasha Chiefs played minor league home games at Memorial Park, also referred to as Borden Park. Borden Park took its name from Borden General Hospital, a facility built to treat wounded soldiers during World War II, which occupied a large tract of land that was repurposed to house the ballpark as well as a new civilian hospital and a new high school campus. The original ballpark was a temporary structure adjacent to the creek running through the northwest portion of the Borden General Hospital property, which was hastily constructed for the opening of the 1948 season. Access to the temporary ballpark was through the north gate to the Borden property at the west end of Chickasha Avenue. Seating capacity at the temporary ballpark was 1,100.

A new, more permanent ballpark was constructed for the 1949 season near the newly constructed high school stadium on the south end of the Borden property, with an initial seating capacity of 1,500. That facility burned in August 1950 and was rebuilt for the following season. Seating capacity had increased to 1,700 by 1950 and 2,500 by 1952. Borden Park, which is now called Elliott Field and is used for high school baseball, is located at 200 North 19th Street.

== Timeline ==
Year(s)	# Yrs.	Team	Level	League	Ballpark
1948–1952	5	Chickasha Chiefs	Class D	Sooner State League	Memorial Park

== Year–by–year records ==
Year	Record	Finish	Manager	Playoffs/Notes
1948	73–63	4th	Ray Honeycutt	Lost in 1st round
1949	78–61	3rd	Ray Honeycutt	Lost in 1st round
1950	80–59	3rd	Ray Honeycutt	Lost in 1st round
1951	46–94	6th	Kelly Wingo / Ivan Wilkerson; Jerry Jackson / Chet Bryan; William Reye	Did not qualify
1952	78–62	3rd	Ray Taylor	Lost in 1st round

== Notable alumni ==
- Ed Cole (1950)
- Camilo Pascual (1951) Minnesota Twins Hall of Fame
- Pete Runnels (1949) 5× MLB All-Star, 2× AL batting champion (1960, 1962), Boston Red Sox Hall of Fame
- Chickasha Chiefs players
