= Ardmore, Oklahoma minor league baseball history =

Ardmore, Oklahoma minor league teams
- 1904–1961; (1904, 1911–1914, 1917, 1921–1926, 1947–1957, 1961); Ardmore, Oklahoma

Minor league affiliations
- Class: Class C (1904); Class D (1911–1914, 1917, 1921–1922); Class C 1923–1926; Class D (1947–1957); Class AA (1961)
- League: Texas League (1904); Texas-Oklahoma League (1911–1914); Western Association (1917); Texas-Oklahoma League (1921–1922); Western Association (1923); Oklahoma State League (1924); Western Association (1924–1926); Sooner State League (1947–1957); Texas League (1961)

Major league affiliations
- Team: Cleveland Indians (1947–1948); St. Louis Cardinals (1953–1957); Baltimore Orioles (1961)

Minor league titles
- League titles (3): 1923; 1925; 1957
- Conference titles (3): 1912; 1924; 1951
- Wild card berths (3): 1947; 1954; 1957

Team data
- Name: Ardmore Territorians (1904); Ardmore Blues (1911); Ardmore Giants (1912–1913); Ardmore Indians (1914); Ardmore Foundlings (1917); Ardmore Peps (1921); Ardmore Producers (1922); Ardmore Snappers (1923); Ardmore Bearcats (1924); Ardmore Boomers (1925–1926); Ardmore Indians (1947–1952); Ardmore Cardinals (1953–1957); Ardmore Rosebuds (1961)
- Ballpark: Washington Street Park (1911–1914); Lorena Park (1911–1912); Putnam Park (1917); Texas-Oklahoma League Park (1921-1922); Snapper Park (1923); Ardmore Baseball Park (1924–1926); Tribe Park/Cardinal Park (1948–1955); Cardinal Park (1956–1957, 1961)

Minor league baseball teams were based in Ardmore, Oklahoma, playing in various seasons between 1904 and 1961. Ardmore teams played in the 1904 Texas League, Texas-Oklahoma League (1911–1914), 1917 Western Association, Texas-Oklahoma League (1921–1922), 1923 Western Association, 1924 Oklahoma State League, Western Association (1924–1926), Sooner State League (1947–1957) and Texas League (1961). Ardmore captured league championships in 1923, 1925 and 1957.

Ardmore teams played as a minor league affiliate of the Cleveland Indians from 1947 to 1948, St. Louis Cardinals from 1953 to 1957 and Baltimore Orioles in 1961.

Baseball Hall of Fame inductee Carl Hubbell played for the 1924 Ardmore Bearcats at age 21.

== History ==
Minor league professional baseball began in Ardmore during the 1904 season. On August 5, 1904, the Texas League member franchise Paris Red Ravens relocated from Paris, Texas to Ardmore and became the Ardmore Territorians to finish the 1904 season. The team finished with a 26–75 overall record.

The 1911 Ardmore Blues resumed minor league play. The Blues placed fifth as a founding member of the 1911 Texas-Oklahoma League, with a record of 49–58. The Ardmore Giants (1912–1913) and Ardmore Indians (1914) continued play as members of the Texas-Oklahoma League. The 1912 Giants won the regular season title and were down 2–1 in the league finals when the team folded for the season on August 1, giving the title to the Wichita Falls Drillers. The 1913 Giants finished 43–70. The Ardmore Indians were 26–25 when the team folded on June 11, 1914., along with the Hugo Scouts. The Texas-Oklahoma League folded after the 1914 season.

The 1917 Ardmore Foundlings were founded when the Paris Athletics moved from Paris, Texas on May 10, 1917. The Foundlings finished the 1917 season in Ardmore, playing in the Western Association. The team compiled a record of 43–84 while based in Ardmore, finishing 57–98 overall.

The Ardmore Peps (1921) and Ardmore Producers (1922) played in the reformed Texas-Oklahoma League. The Peps placed second in 1921 with an 87–40 record. Meeting the first place Paris Snappers (managed by and named after Red Snapp) from Paris, Texas in the finals, the series was tied 4 games to 4 when Ardmore refused to play the ninth game in Paris, giving Paris the title. The Producers were 49–60, setting in fourth place, when the Texas-Oklahoma League season ended on August 6, 1922, due to a railroad strike. The league did not return in 1923.

The 1923 Ardmore Snappers were named after and managed by former Paris rival Red Snapp. Ardmore joined the Western Association in 1923. The team finished 82–60 and defeating the Okmulgee Drillers 4–0 in the league finals to capture the 1923 Western Association Championship.

Ardmore played in two leagues in 1924. The franchise began the season playing in the Oklahoma State League and ended it playing in the Western Association. On June 8, 1924, Ardmore was in first place with a 30–19 record in the Oklahoma State League, when the franchise moved to Pawhuska, Oklahoma and became the Pashuska Huskies. The Ardmore/Pashuska team was in first place when the Oklahoma State League folded on July 8, 1924. When Ardmore moved on June 8, they were immediately given a franchise in the Western Association, in which they were defending champions. The Western Association Bartlesville Bearcats moved to Ardmore on June 8, 1924. Bartlesville moved with a 19–23 record and the Ardmore Bearcats finished the season with an overall record of 59–59.

Baseball Hall of Fame member Carl Hubbell pitched for the 1924 Ardmore Bearcats. At age 21, Hubbell was 1–0 with an 8.31 ERA in 13 innings, pitching in his second professional season and the first for which statistics are available.

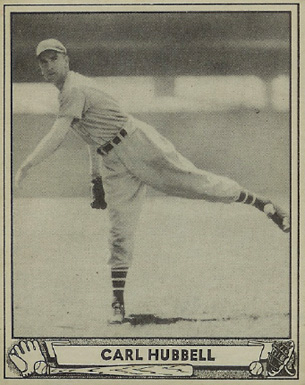
(1940) Carl Hubbell. Play Ball baseball card

Remaining in the Western Association, the 1925 Ardmore Boomers took their name from the 1920s oil boom that positively affected Ardmore. The 1925 Ardmore Boomers finished 86–64 and defeated the Muskogee Athletics 4–1 in the league finals to capture the 1925 Western Association Championship. In 1926 however, the franchise moved to Joplin, Missouri on July 14, 1926, to become the Joplin Ozarks. There the team lost in the league finals.

Ardmore remained without professional baseball until 1947. The Ardmore Indians (1947–1952) began play in the newly formed Sooner State League in 1947, with fellow founding members Ada Herefords, Duncan Cementers, Lawton Giants, McAlester Rockets and Seminole Oilers.

The "Indians" moniker came from Ardmore being an affiliate of the Cleveland Indians in 1947 and 1948. In their first season, the Indians made the 1947 league finals, but were defeated by the McAlester rockets 4 games to 1. Finishing 75–65 in 1950, the Indians reached the league finals, where they were defeated 4–2 by McAlester. In 1951, the Indians captured the pennant with a 99–40 record, but were again defeated by the McAlester Rockets in the league finals, 4–2. The Indians dropped to 49–91 in 1952, last in the league.

Remaining in the Sooner State League in 1953, Ardmore became an affiliate of the St. Louis Cardinals (1953–1957). The Ardmore Cardinals (1953–1957) finished with the league's best record in 1953 (91–46) and 1956 (83–56) and made playoffs in four of five seasons. Ardmore lost to the Lawton Braves 4–0 in the 1954 finals and the Seminole Oilers 4–3 in the 1956 finals. After finishing 74–52 in 1957, the Ardmore Cardinals swept the Paris Orioles from Paris, Texas 4–0 in the 1957 Sooner State League finals to capture the championship. The Sooner State League folded after the 1957 season.

The last minor league baseball team in Ardmore was the 1961 Ardmore Rosebuds. The Victoria Rosebuds moved to Ardmore on May 27, 1961, and finished the remainder of 1961 Class AA level Texas League season. The team was affiliate of the Baltimore Orioles. The Rosebuds finished 57–83 overall in 1961. In 1962, the Victoria/Ardmore franchise was replaced in the Texas League by the El Paso Sun Kings.

Ardmore, Oklahoma has not hosted another minor league team.

== The ballparks ==
From 1911 to 1914, Ardmore teams played minor league home games primarily at Washington Street Park. Washington Street Park was located on the west side of South Washington Street, between 4th Avenue SW & 5th Avenue SW, Ardmore, Oklahoma. Sunday games during 1911 and 1912 were played at Lorena Park, which was not subject to Ardmore blue laws because it was outside the city limits. Lorena Park was located along what is now Mount Washington Road, southeast of the present-day Dornick Hills Golf Club.

In 1917, Ardmore home games were played at Putnam Park. The ballpark was located on the north side of what is now 14th Street N.W., near the intersection with Wolverton Street, adjacent to what was then the Ardmore Street Railway Co. car barn. The grandstand for Putnam Park was moved to this site from Lorena Park. The ballpark took its name from I.M. Putnam, the Oklahoma City-based real estate developer who served as general manager of the Street Railway Company that donated the land and other materials for the park.

In 1921 and 1922, Ardmore teams played at Texas-Oklahoma League Park, the name of which was often shortened to "T-O League Park." The ballpark was located along A Street S.W. between 4th Avenue SW & 5th Avenue SW, in the same former cotton yard that had previously served as the site of Washington Street Park. In 1923, the home field was called Snapper Park, while the Ardmore teams in the next several years played at Ardmore Baseball Park.

From 1948 to 1955, Ardmore teams played home games at Tribe Park, also named Cardinal Park. This ballpark was located at 1441 North Washington Street, where Will Rogers Elementary School was subsequently built. Tribe Park/Cardinal Park had a capacity of 2,000 (1948), 1,500 (1950), and 2,500 (1954), with dimensions of (Left, Center, Right): 312–358–312. In 1956, a new Cardinal Park was opened. Ardmore teams played in this ballpark in 1956, 1957, and 1961. The new Cardinal Park held 4,000 (1961). It had dimensions of (Left, Center, Right): 305–371–315 (1961). The park is still in use today, located at 1002 East Main, Ardmore, Oklahoma.

== Media ==
Ardmore minor league baseball is the subject of two books by author Peter G. Pierce:

- Territorians to Boomers: Professional Baseball in Ardmore 1904-1926 ISBN 1-88-559691-X
- Indians, Cardinals and Rosebuds: Professional Baseball in Ardmore 1947-1961 ISBN 1-88-559692-8

== Notable alumni ==
- Carl Hubbell (1924) Inducted Baseball Hall of Fame, 1947
- Walter Blair (1904)
- Jackie Brandt (1953) 2x MLB All-Star
- Lloyd Brown (1925)
- Chris Cannizzaro (1957) MLB All-Star
- Gene Green (1954)
- Smead Jolley (1924)
- Gus Ketchum (1922)
- Jack Krol (1954–1955)
- Marty Kutyna (1953)
- Dave McNally (1961) 3x MLB All-Star; Baltimore Orioles Hall of Fame
- Frank Mancuso (1954-1955, MGR)
- Pepper Martin (1923) 4x MLB All-Star; St. Louis Cardinals Hall of Fame
- Alex Metzler (1925)
- Wilcy Moore (1923) MLB ERA Title
- Gene Oliver (1956)
- Red Snapp (1923, MGR)
- Cotton Tierney (1914)
- Pete Ward (1961)
- Bennie Warren (1950–1951, 1953–1954 MGR)
- Ardmore Bearcats players
- Ardmore Boomers players
- Ardmore Cardinals players
- Ardmore Indians players
- Ardmore Producers players
- Ardmore Rosebuds players
- Ardmore Snappers players
- Ardmore Territorians players
