= Paris Orioles =

- 1955–1957; Paris, Texas

Minor league affiliations
- Class: Class D (1955–1957)
- League: Sooner State League (1955–1957)

Major league affiliations
- Team: Baltimore Orioles (1955–1957)

Minor league titles
- Conference titles (1): 1957
- Wild card berths (2): 1955; 1956

Team data
- Name: Paris Orioles (1955–1957)
- Ballpark: City Ball Park (1955–1957)

The Paris Orioles were a minor league baseball team based in Paris, Texas. From 1955 to 1957, the Orioles played as members of the Class D level Sooner State League League as a minor league affiliate of the Baltimore Orioles. Hosting home games at the City Ball Park, the Orioles qualified for the playoffs in all three seasons of play, winning the 1957 pennant. The Orioles were the final minor league team based in Paris. There were numerous prior Paris minor league teams, after Paris first hosted a minor league baseball in 1896.

== History ==
Minor League baseball began in Paris, Texas with the 1896 Paris Midlands of the Texas Association. A Class-C team called the Paris Pirates played for half a season in 1934.

The Orioles were immediately preceded by the Paris Indians, who played in 1952 and 1953, as members of the Class D level Big State League.

The Paris "Orioles" were members of the eight-team Class D level Sooner State League from 1955 to 1957. After making the playoffs with fourth place finishes in their first two seasons, the Orioles captured the 1957 Sooner State League pennant. Paris joined the Ardmore Cardinals, Gainesville Owls, Lawton Braves, McAlester Rockets, Muskogee Giants, Seminole Oilers and Shawnee Hawks in beginning league play on April 19, 1955.

In 1955, the Orioles placed fourth in the Sooner State League regular season with a record of 68–69 and finished 26.0 games behind the pennant winning Lawton Braves. In the first round of the four–team playoffs, Paris was eliminated by the eventual champion Lawton Braves 3 games to 1. Paris was managed by Jimmy Adair.

Continuing Sooner State League play in 1956, the Orioles again finished the regular season in fourth place in the Sooner State League regular season standings, playing under returning manager Jimmy Adair and Barney Lutz. Paris ended the regular season with a 72–67 record and finished 11.0 games behind the pennant winning Ardmore Cardinals. In the playoffs, the Ardmore Cardinals defeated Paris 3 games to 2 in the 1st round.

In their final season of play, the 1957 Paris Orioles won the Sooner State League pennant and advanced to the league Finals. After a 74–51 1957 regular season record, under returning manager Barney Lutz and Billy Capps, the Paris Orioles finished 0.5 games ahead of the second place Ardmore Cardinals. In the playoffs, the Orioles defeated the Shawnee Hawks 3 games to 1 in their first-round playoff series. The Orioles were swept by Ardmore 4 games to 0 in the championship series in the final games of the franchise.

The Sooner State League permanently folded following the completion of the 1957 season. Paris, Texas has not hosted another minor league team.

== The ballpark ==
From 1946 to 1957, the Orioles and their predecessor Paris Red Peppers (1946–1947), Paris Rockets (1948), Paris Panthers (1949–1950), and Paris Indians (1952–1953) teams hosted home minor league games at City Ball Park. The ballpark had a noted capacity of 4,000.

== Timeline ==
| Year(s) | # Yrs. | Team | Level | League | Affiliate | Ballpark |
|---|---|---|---|---|---|---|
| 1955–1957 | 3 | Paris Orioles | Class D | Sooner State League | Baltimore Orioles | City Ball Park |

== Season–by–season ==
| Year | Record | Manager | Finish | Playoffs/Notes |
|---|---|---|---|---|
| 1955 | 68–69 | Jimmy Adair | 4th | Lost 1st round |
| 1956 | 72–67 | Jimmy Adair / Barney Lutz | 4th | Lost 1st round |
| 1957 | 74–51 | Barney Lutz / Billy Capps | 1st | League pennant Lost in Finals |

== Notable alumni ==
- Jimmy Adair (1955, MGR)
- Steve Barber (1957), Baltimore Orioles Hall of Fame
- Barney Lutz (1956, MGR)
- Roger Marquis (1957)
- Barry Shetrone (1956)
- Paris Orioles players

== See also ==
- List of Texas League teams
