= Knox Township, Pennsylvania =

Knox Township is the name of some places in the U.S. state of Pennsylvania:

- Knox Township, Clarion County, Pennsylvania
- Knox Township, Clearfield County, Pennsylvania
- Knox Township, Jefferson County, Pennsylvania
