= Frank Mancuso (disambiguation) =

Frank Mancuso (1918–2007) was a baseball player and politician.

Frank Mancuso may also refer to:

- Frank Mancuso Sr. (1933–2026), film executive
- Frank Mancuso Jr. (born 1958), film producer
- Franck Mancuso (or François Mancuso), filmmaker
