= Hoscheit =

Hoscheit is a surname. Notable people with the surname include:

- Jean-Pierre Hoscheit (born 1951), more commonly known by the pen name Jhemp Hoscheit, Luxembourgish writer
- Vern Hoscheit (1922–2007), American professional baseball catcher, coach, and manager
