= Gene Oliver =

American baseball player (1935–2007)

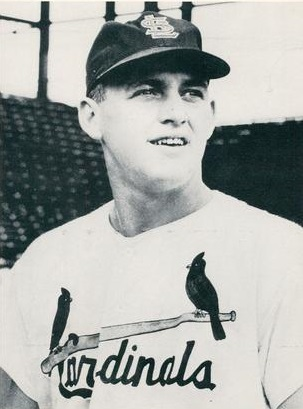
- Oliver with the Cardinals, c. 1962
- Catcher / First baseman / Outfielder
- Born: March 22, 1935; Moline, Illinois, U.S.
- Died: March 3, 2007 (aged 71); Rock Island, Illinois, U.S.
- Batted: Right Threw: Right

MLB debut
- June 6, 1959, for the St. Louis Cardinals

Last MLB appearance
- August 24, 1969, for the Chicago Cubs

MLB statistics
- Batting average: .246
- Home runs: 93
- Runs batted in: 320
- Stats at Baseball Reference

Teams
- St. Louis Cardinals (1959, 1961–1963); Milwaukee / Atlanta Braves (1963–1967); Philadelphia Phillies (1967); Boston Red Sox (1968); Chicago Cubs (1968–1969)

Eugene George Oliver (March 22, 1935 – March 3, 2007) was an American professional baseball player who appeared 786 games in Major League Baseball, as a catcher, first baseman, outfielder and pinch hitter, from 1959 to 1969. Oliver played for the St. Louis Cardinals (1959, 1961–63), Milwaukee / Atlanta Braves (1963–67), Philadelphia Phillies (1967), Boston Red Sox (1968) and Chicago Cubs (1968–69). He batted and threw right-handed. stood 6 feet 2 inches (1.88 m) tall and weighed 225 pounds (102 kg).

== Early life ==
Oliver was born in Moline, Illinois, the eldest son and fourth of five children born to Stella (née Richter) and Marshall Oliver. His father, a farm equipment worker, was an immigrant from Belgium while his mother was an immigrant from Poland.

He graduated from Alleman Catholic High School where he was a three-sport star. Initially, he was being scouted by the Detroit Tigers, turning down a $60,000 bonus for a football scholarship to Northwestern University. However, a shoulder injury during a high school football match ended his football career as well as the Tigers' interest in him. He attended Northwestern on a baseball scholarship but left after two years, feeling dejected.

While working at IBM, his wife Marilyn encouraged him to continue baseball. Oliver began to rehabilitate his arm under his former coach from American Legion baseball. He attracted Joe Monahan, a scout from the St. Louis Cardinals who had previously been interested in him. He arranged a tryout at a local YMCA; Monahan found his arm to be sound and signed him with the Cardinals in 1956.

== Baseball career ==
=== Minor leagues ===
Oliver began his professional baseball career in the Class-D Albany Cardinals of the Georgia-Florida League where was very briefly before moving to the Class-D Ardmore Cardinals of the Sooner State League where he hit .333 with 39 home runs and 113 runs batted in in 122 games.

The following year, he moved to the Class-B Winston-Salem Red Birds of the Carolina League, hitting .285 with 30 home runs. For his strong performance, he was promoted to the Triple-A Rochester Red Wings of the International League where he remained for three seasons except for a 68-game stint with the St. Louis Cardinals in 1959. In 1961, he began to year with the Cardinals, where he was used sparingly by manager Solly Hemus, before being sent Triple-A Portland Beavers of the Pacific Coast League.

=== Major leagues ===
Although he spent seven full years and three partial seasons in the majors, Oliver was a regular for only two seasons, as the catcher for the Cardinals in 1962 and the first baseman for the Braves in 1963. Oliver had a strong arm and was good at blocking the plate. As a batter, he had some power and decent speed for a catcher.

He made his major league debut in 1959 against the Philadelphia Phillies but would not stick with the parent club until 1962. He was traded to the Milwaukee Braves in 1963 and remained there till 1967.

In 1965, Oliver reached a high-career mark of 21 home runs with the Braves in their final season in Milwaukee, enabling the 1965 Braves to set a National League record with six 20-HR hitters in one season. On June 8 of that year, Joe Torre, Eddie Mathews, Hank Aaron and Oliver hit tenth-inning home runs in a Braves victory over the Cubs, setting a major league record for most long balls in a single inning of an extra-inning game.

The Phillies and Braves switched catchers in 1967, with Bob Uecker going to Atlanta. After the trade, Oliver suffered a severe knee injury that shortened his career. Before the 1968 season, he was traded first to the Boston Red Sox and then sold to the Chicago Cubs before being released the following season.

In his ten-season career, Oliver hit .246 with 93 home runs, 320 runs batted in, 268 runs scored, 111 doubles, five triples, and 24 stolen bases in 786 games.

In contrast to his less-than-stellar career, Oliver hit future Hall of Fame pitcher Sandy Koufax better than average, going 20-for-51 (.392) with 4 home runs and 9 runs batted in. At a banquet dias the two were attending together, years after they both had retired, Koufax joked to Oliver: "How did a putz like you hit .392 off me?"

== Personal life ==
In 1955, Oliver married Marilyn (née Daxon); they were married for 52 years, until his death. They had two children, Dana and Daniel, and six grandchildren.

Oliver remained close to his former Cubs teammates and acted as social director for Randy Hundley's fantasy baseball camps.

He died in Rock Island, Illinois, on March 3, 2007, due to complications from lung surgery, and was interred at Calvary Mausoleum in Rock Island. He was survived by his wife and two children. Former teammates, including Hundley and Glenn Beckert attended his funeral.
