= Lucinda, Pennsylvania =

Unincorporated community in Pennsylvania, US

- Unincorporated community
- Location within Pennsylvania
- Coordinates: 41°18′30″N 79°22′11″W
- Country: United States
- State: Pennsylvania
- County: Clarion
- Township: Knox
- Elevation: 1,545 ft (471 m)
- Time zone: UTC-5 (Eastern (EST))
  - Summer (DST): UTC-4 (EDT)
- ZIP code: 16235
- Area code: 814
- GNIS feature ID: 1180060

Lucinda is an unincorporated community in Clarion County, Pennsylvania, United States. The community is located on Pennsylvania Route 66, 6.5 miles (10.5 km) north of Clarion. Lucinda has a post office with ZIP code 16235, which opened on January 15, 1840.

== Notable person ==
- Barney Lutz, professional baseball player, manager, and scout
