= Snydersburg, Pennsylvania =

Unincorporated community in Pennsylvania, US

- Unincorporated community
- Location within Pennsylvania
- Coordinates: 41°19′58″N 79°21′20″W
- Country: United States
- State: Pennsylvania
- County: Clarion
- Township: Knox
- Elevation: 1,594 ft (486 m)
- Time zone: UTC-5 (Eastern (EST))
  - Summer (DST): UTC-4 (EDT)
- ZIP code: 16257
- Area code: 814
- GNIS feature ID: 1187966

Snydersburg is an unincorporated community in Clarion County, Pennsylvania, United States. The community is located on Pennsylvania Route 66, 8.3 miles (13.4 km) north of Clarion. Snydersburg had a post office from December 31, 1889, to April 23, 2005; it still has its own ZIP code, 16257.
