= Locke Field =

Former baseball field in the US

Coordinates: 33.6212°N 97.1489°W

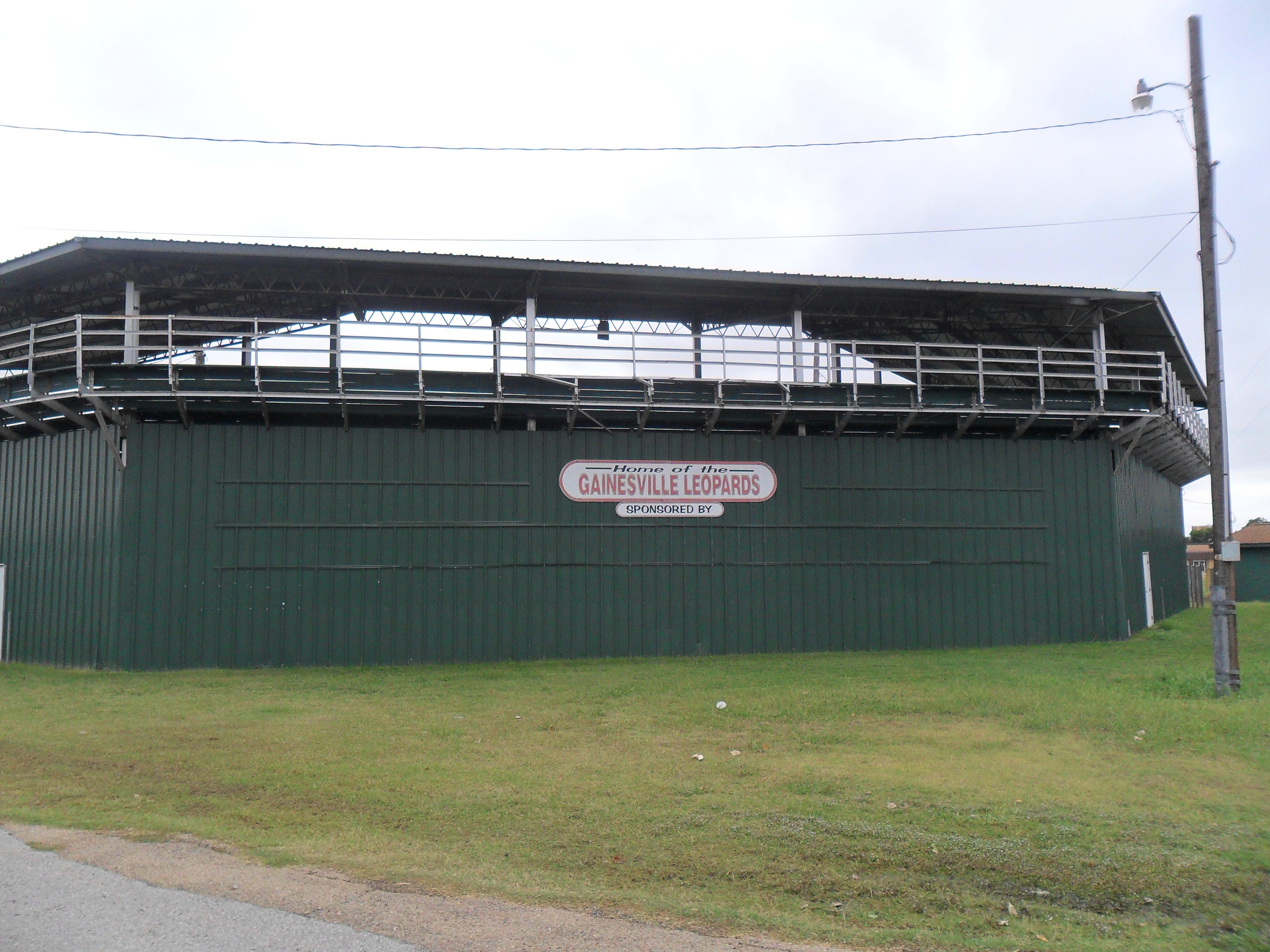
- Locke Field, seen here in October of 2014.
- Interactive map of Locke Field
- Full name: Locke Field
- Location: Gainesville, Texas

Construction
- Demolished: 2015

Tenants
- Gainesville Owls (Big State League) (1947-1951) (Sooner State League) (1953-1955)

Locke Field was a baseball field located in Gainesville, TX on Interstate 35; it was home to the minor league baseball Gainesville Owls from 1947 to 1955. It has also been used for UIL games over the years. In 2015, it was demolished to make way for an apartment complex.

== Appearance by Elvis ==
On April 14, 1955, Elvis Presley, before he became a household name, performed a concert at Locke Field in Gainesville. Only 150 fans showed up, and the concert drew "in the red."

== Sources ==
- "Texas Almanac 2008-2009," The Dallas Morning News, c.2008
