= Tommy Warren =

American baseball player

- Pitcher
- Born: July 5, 1917; Tulsa, Oklahoma, U.S.
- Died: January 2, 1968 (aged 50); Tulsa, Oklahoma, U.S.
- Batted: Switch Threw: Left

MLB debut
- April 18, 1944, for the Brooklyn Dodgers

Last MLB appearance
- September 3, 1944, for the Brooklyn Dodgers

MLB statistics
- Win–loss record: 1–4
- Earned run average: 4.98
- Strikeouts: 18
- Stats at Baseball Reference

Teams
- Brooklyn Dodgers (1944)

Thomas Gentry Warren (July 5, 1917 – January 2, 1968) was an Oklahoma Muscogee Major League Baseball left-handed pitcher. He was born in Tulsa, Oklahoma.

Warren is one of many ballplayers who only appeared in the major leagues during World War II conflict. He made 22 pitching appearances for the Brooklyn Dodgers during the 1944 season, starting four of them and completing two, allowing 114 baserunners on 74 hits and 40 walks in just 68 2/3 innings. He also gave up 52 runs (14 unearned), while his lone win came on July 30, 1944 in the first game of a doubleheader at Ebbets Field, when he was the starting pitcher in a 10–4 victory against the St. Louis Cardinals.

Warren's 1944 season totals included a record of 1–4 with 18 strikeouts and an ERA of 4.98, ending ninth in the National League with 14 games finished. A pretty good switch hitting pitcher, he batted .256 (11-for-43) with one run scored and two RBI in 41 games, 19 of them in pinch hitting duties.

In between, Warren spent 14 seasons in the Minor Leagues and played winter ball with the Sabios de Vargas of the Venezuelan Professional Baseball League in 1949. He played for the Galt Terriers of the semipro Intercounty League in southern Ontario in the summer of 1949. During the seventh game of a league semifinal series versus the Brantford Red Sox, Warren, playing center field, badly misplayed a routine fly ball late in the game that allowed Brantford to take the lead. Suspicions linger to this day about the honesty of Warren's efforts in that crucial game.

Plagued by gambling problems and related debts, Warren died by suicide in his hometown of Tulsa, Oklahoma, at the age of 50.
