= Lawton Braves =

- 1954–1957; (1911, 1947–1957); Lawton, Oklahoma

Minor league affiliations
- Class: Class D (1911, 1947–1957)
- League: Texas-Oklahoma League (1911); Sooner State League (1947–1957)

Major league affiliations
- Team: New York Giants (1947–1951); Cincinnati Reds (1952–1953); Milwaukee Braves (1954–1957)

Minor league titles
- League titles (3): 1949; 1954; 1955
- Wild card berths (4): 1948; 1949; 1954; 1956

Team data
- Name: Lawton Medicine Men (1911); Lawton Giants (1947–1951); Lawton Reds (1952–1953); Lawton Braves (1954–1957)
- Ballpark: Koehler Park (1911); Memorial Park (1947–1957)

The Lawton Braves was the final and primary name of the minor league baseball teams based in Lawton, Oklahoma from 1947 to 1957. Lawton played as a member of the Texas-Oklahoma League in 1911 and the Sooner State League from 1947 to 1957, winning league championships in 1949, 1954 and 1955. Lawton hosted home games at Koehler Park in 1911 and all others at Memorial Park.

Lawton was a minor league affiliate of the Milwaukee Braves (1954–1957), Cincinnati Reds (1952–1953) and New York Giants (1947–1951).

Baseball Hall of Fame member Travis Jackson managed the Lawton Braves from 1954 to 1957.

== History ==
Lawton first had minor league baseball in 1911, when the city briefly hosted a team in the Texas-Oklahoma League. The Lawton Medicine Men had a 17–31 record when the Lawton franchise folded on June 14, 1911.

Lawton next played in the Class D level Sooner State League from 1947 to 1957. Lawton teams played as affiliates of the Milwaukee Braves (1954–1957), Cincinnati Reds (1952–1953) and New York Giants (1947–1951). Lawton took the moniker of their affiliates in each case. Lawton won Kansas-Oklahoma-Missouri League championships in 1949, 1954 and 1955. The 1954 and 1955 Lawton Braves championship teams were managed by Baseball Hall of Fame inductee Travis Jackson. The Sooner State League folded after the 1957 season.

== The ballparks ==
The 1947 to 1957 Lawton teams played home games at Memorial Park. The ballpark was located at 17th and G Streets, S.W., in the area that is now called Ahlschlager Park. The ballpark had a capacity of 3,600 (1947) and 2,000 (1953). Over their final four seasons, Lawton's season attendance had dropped from 47,000 in 1954 to 15,000 by 1957.

In 1911, Lawton played at home games at Koehler Park. Koehler Park was located between S.W. A and C Avenues on the north and south and S.W. 14th and 15th Streets on the east and west in Lawton, Oklahoma.

== Timeline ==
Year(s)	# Yrs.	Team	Level	League	Affiliate	Ballpark
1911	1	Lawton Medicine Men	Class D	Texas-Oklahoma League	None	Kohler Park
1947–1951	5	Lawton Giants	Class D	Sooner State League	New York Giants	Memorial Park
1952–1953	2	Lawton Reds	Class D	Sooner State League	Cincinnati Reds	Memorial Park
1954–1957	4	Lawton Braves	Class D	Sooner State League	Milwaukee Braves	Memorial Park

== Season-by-season ==
Year	Record	Win–loss %	Manager	Finish	Playoffs/notes
1947	98–42	.700	Louis Brower	1st	Lost 1st round
1948	77–59	.566	Louis Brower	2nd	Lost 1st round
1949	87–52	.625	Louis Brower	2nd	League champions
1950	37–101	.268	Louis Brower	8th	Did not qualify
1951	46–94	.328	Ray Baker	7th	Did not qualify
1952	63–77	.450	Tuck McWilliams	6th	Did not qualify
1953	47–59	.443	Tuck McWilliams	7th	Did not qualify
1954	81–58	.582	Travis Jackson	2nd	League champions
1955	95–44	.683	Travis Jackson	1st	League champions
1956	80–60	.571	Travis Jackson	2nd	Lost 1st round
1957	59–66	.472	Travis Jackson	6th	Did not qualify

== Notable alumni ==
- Travis Jackson (1954–1957, MGR) Inducted Baseball Hall of Fame, 1982
- Ed Albrecht (1947)
- Marv Blaylock (1948)
- Louis Brower (1947–1950, Player/MGR)
- Bob Harrison (1948-1949)
- Bobby Knoop (1957) MLB All-Star; Angels Hall of Fame
- Ron Piche (1955)
- Charlie Rabe (1952)
- Ron Samford (1948)
- Lawton Giants players
- Lawton Reds players
