= South McAlester Miners =

The South McAlester Miners, not to be confused with the McAlester Miners, were a Class-D South Central League professional baseball team based in South McAlester, Oklahoma, United States that existed in 1906. They were managed by former major league third baseman Jud Smith.

Their first scheduled game was on May 1 against the Fort Smith Razorbacks. They folded in August with the league, finishing in first place with a 59-32 record.
