= Travis Jackson =

American baseball player (1903-1987)

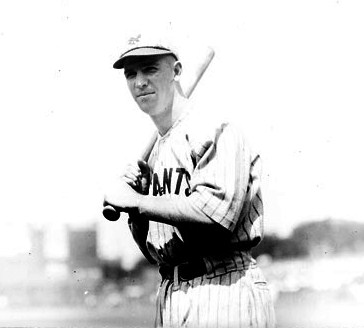
- Jackson in 1923
- Shortstop
- Born: November 2, 1903; Waldo, Arkansas, U.S.
- Died: July 27, 1987 (aged 83); Waldo, Arkansas, U.S.
- Batted: Right Threw: Right

MLB debut
- September 22, 1922, for the New York Giants

Last MLB appearance
- September 24, 1936, for the New York Giants

MLB statistics
- Batting average: .291
- Home runs: 135
- Runs batted in: 929
- Stats at Baseball Reference

Teams
- New York Giants (1922–1936)

Career highlights and awards
- All-Star (1934); World Series champion (1933)

Member of the National

Baseball Hall of Fame
- Induction: 1982
- Election method: Veterans Committee

Travis Calvin Jackson (November 2, 1903 – July 27, 1987) was an American Major League Baseball (MLB) shortstop. He played for the New York Giants from 1922 through 1936, winning the 1933 World Series, and representing the Giants in the MLB All-Star Game in 1934. After his retirement as a player, Jackson managed in minor league baseball to the 1960 season.

Jackson was discovered by Kid Elberfeld at a minor league baseball game at the age of 14. Elberfeld signed Jackson to his first professional contract, and recommended him to John McGraw, manager of the Giants. His exceptional range at shortstop led to the nickname "Stonewall." Jackson was inducted into the National Baseball Hall of Fame in 1982.

== Early life ==
Jackson was born in Waldo, Arkansas, on November 2, 1903. He was the only child of William Jackson, a wholesale grocer, and his wife Etta, who named their son after William B. Travis, a lieutenant colonel who died at the Battle of the Alamo. Jackson's father bought him a baseball when he was three years old, and they often played catch together.

Jackson's uncle took him to a Little Rock Travelers minor-league game when he was 14 years old. At the game, Jackson's uncle introduced him to Kid Elberfeld, telling Elberfeld that his nephew was a talented baseball player. Elberfeld observed Jackson in an impromptu workout, and asked Jackson to contact him when he was ready to begin his professional career.

Jackson attended Ouachita Baptist University in Arkadelphia, Arkansas, where he starred on the college baseball team. While there, he injured his knee, and this injury would recur during Jackson's career.

== Professional career ==
=== Playing career ===
Following Jackson's collegiate career, Elberfeld signed Jackson to his first contract, and he played for Little Rock in 1921 and 1922. Jackson committed 72 errors during the 1922 season, which he considered the "world record for errors".

"I guess I set a world record for errors. I had a pretty good arm, see, but I didn't have much control. A lot of those were double errors — two on the same play, a boot and then a wild throw. The people in the first-base and right-field bleachers knew me. When the ball was hit to me they scattered. 'Watch out! He's got it again.'"

— Travis Jackson on his performance in the 1922 season

Despite this, Elberfeld recommended Jackson to John McGraw, manager of the New York Giants of the National League (NL), who was entitled to a Travelers player as he had lent a player to the team in 1922. McGraw signed Jackson to a contract on June 30, effective at the end of the Southern Association's 1922 season.

Jackson debuted with the Giants on September 22, 1922, appearing in three games. With Dave Bancroft and Heinie Groh, the Giants' starting shortstop and third baseman respectively, sidelined with injuries incurred during the 1923 season, Jackson drew notice as a fill-in. McGraw was confident enough in Jackson's abilities to trade Bancroft before the 1924 season, choosing Jackson to be the Giants' starting shortstop. Though there was doubt that Jackson could adequately replace Bancroft, Jackson played in 151 games during the 1924 season and hit .302 with 11 home runs. The Giants lost the 1924 World Series to the Washington Senators, with Jackson committing a key error in Game 7.

Jackson was considered one of the best shortstops of his era, and he led NL shortstops with a .970 fielding percentage in 1931. However, he missed considerable playing time in his career resulting from injuries and illnesses. Jackson reinjured his knee in 1925, missed significant time during the 1926 season and had surgery for appendicitis during the 1927 season. He missed time with mumps in 1930 and influenza in 1932, and he continued to battle knee problems, missing much of the 1932 and 1933 seasons. Jackson was said to "at 28, already [have] one foot in the minors". Despite this, manager Bill Terry said that Jackson would "make or break" the 1933 season. Though Jackson fell behind Blondy Ryan on the team's depth chart during the season, he returned in the 1933 World Series, which the Giants won over the Senators.

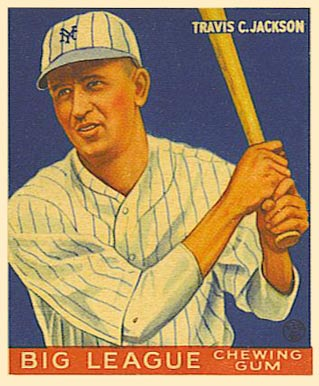
Jackson's 1933 Goudey baseball card

Terry stayed with Jackson as the Giants' starting shortstop for the 1934 season, in which he drove in 101 runs and was chosen to appear in the 1934 MLB All-Star Game. Jackson played third base in his final two seasons, serving as team captain, although he struggled in the 1936 World Series, which the Giants lost to the New York Yankees. After the season, the Giants requested waivers on Jackson to assign him to the minor leagues.

Jackson batted over .300 six times, including a career-high .339 in the 1930 season, and hit 21 home runs in 1929. He was on four NL pennant-winning teams and a World Series champion (1933). Jackson finished his MLB career with 135 home runs, 929 RBI and a .291 batting average.

=== Coaching and managing career ===
Jackson signed a three-year contract with the Jersey City Giants of the Class-AA International League after the 1936 season. The team, which the Giants had purchased to become their top farm team that off-season, was moved from Albany, New York, with Jackson as player-manager. While Jackson's knees limited him to only cameo appearances with Jersey City as a player, he remained as the team's manager until July 1938, when he was replaced with Hank DeBerry. The Giants brought Jackson back to the majors as a coach under former teammate Bill Terry for the remaining 18 months on his contract, succeeding Tommy Clarke, who became a scout.

Jackson missed the next five seasons as he battled tuberculosis, eventually returning to manage in the Boston / Milwaukee Braves system for the Jackson Senators in the Class-B Southeastern League in 1946. Jackson returned to the Giants to coach in 1947 and 1948, receiving his unconditional release following the 1948 season.

Returning to the Braves' minor league system, Jackson managed the Tampa Smokers of the Class-B Florida International League in 1949, but resigned in July during a losing streak. He managed the Owensboro Oilers of the Class-D Kentucky–Illinois–Tennessee League in 1950, and began the 1951 season managing the Bluefield Blue–Grays of the Class-D Appalachian League, but was reassigned to the Hartford Chiefs of the Class-A Eastern League when Hartford manager Tommy Holmes was named the Braves' manager. Jackson managed the Appleton Papermakers of the Class-D Wisconsin State League in 1952 and 1953, the Lawton Braves of the Class-D Sooner State League from 1954 through 1957, the Midland Braves of the Class-D Sophomore League in 1958, the Eau Claire Braves of the Class-C Northern League in 1959 and the Davenport Braves of the Class-D Midwest League in 1960.

== Personal life ==
Jackson and his wife, Mary, had two children, Dorothy Fincher and William Travis Jackson, six grandchildren and four great-grandchildren. Jackson died of Alzheimer's disease in 1987.

== Honors ==
As defensive standouts have historically been overshadowed by power hitters in Baseball Hall of Fame voting, Jackson was not elected through the annual balloting process despite his record and achievements. But in 1982, he was inducted into the Hall of Fame by the Veterans Committee. He was also inducted in the Arkansas Hall of Fame.

== See also ==
- List of members of the Baseball Hall of Fame
- List of Major League Baseball players who spent their entire career with one franchise
