= Knox Township, Clarion County, Pennsylvania =

Township in Pennsylvania, US

Coordinates: 41°18′54″N 79°22′44″W

- Township
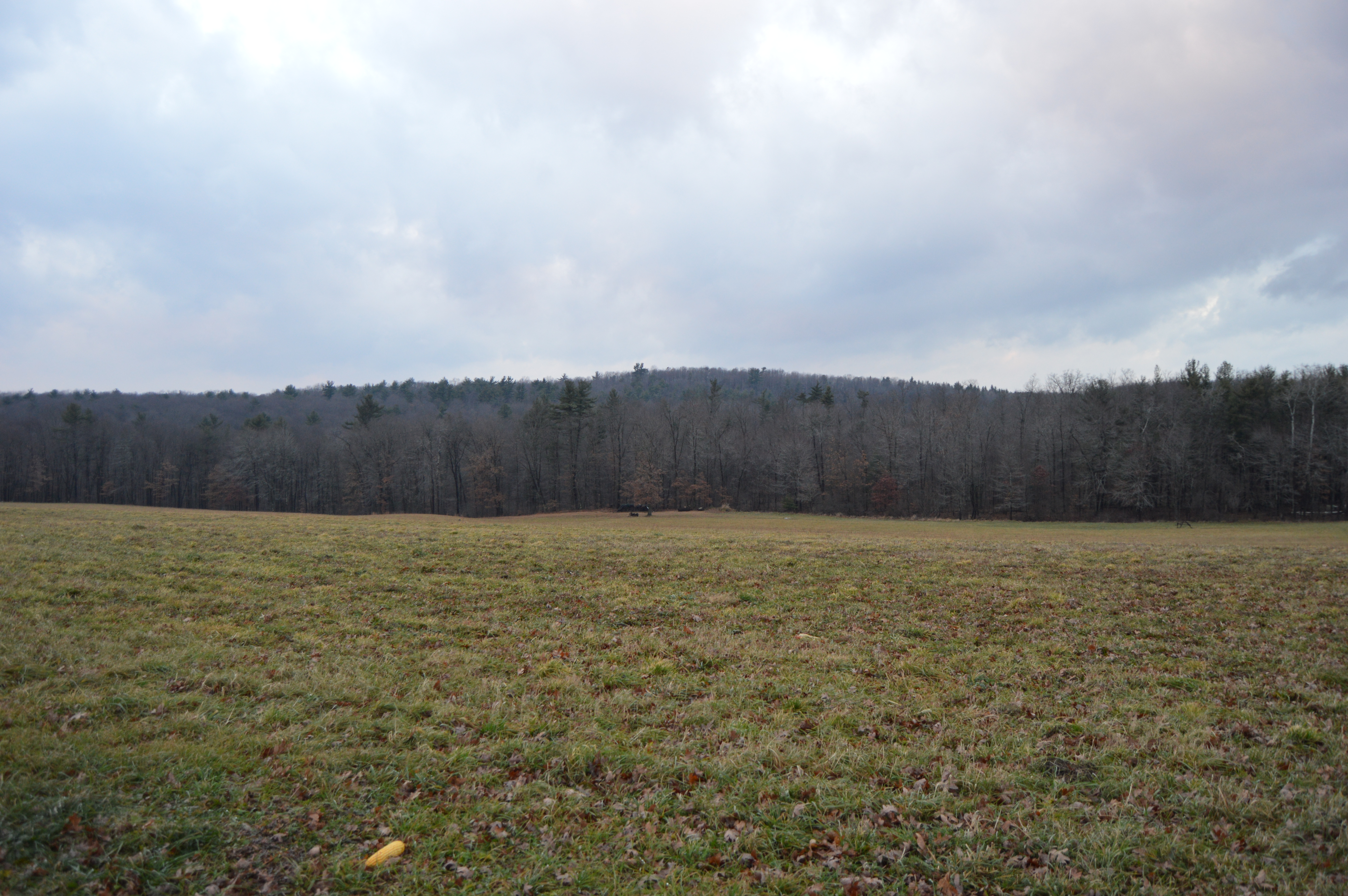
- Fields in the township's far southwest

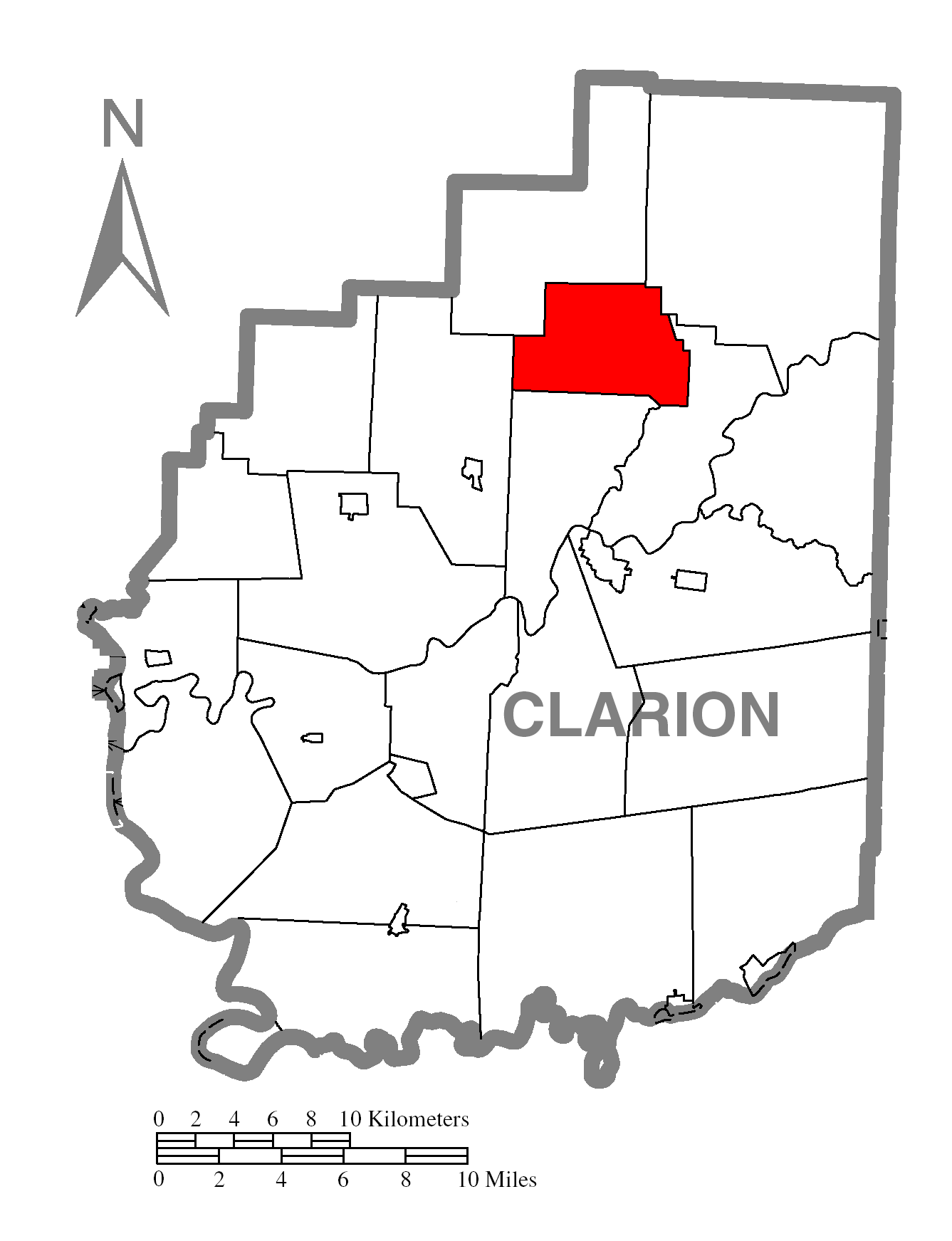
- Map of Clarion County, Pennsylvania highlighting Knox Township

- Map of Clarion County, Pennsylvania
- Country: United States
- State: Pennsylvania
- County: Clarion
- Settled: 1820
- Incorporated: 1853

Area
  - Total: 16.08 sq mi (41.64 km^{2})
  - Land: 16.02 sq mi (41.50 km^{2})
  - Water: 0.050 sq mi (0.13 km^{2})

Population (2020)
  - Total: 993 ▼
  - Estimate (2022): 981
  - Density: 62.0/sq mi (23.9/km^{2})
- Time zone: UTC-5 (Eastern (EST))
  - Summer (DST): UTC-4 (EDT)
- FIPS code: 42-031-40288

Knox Township is a township that is located in Clarion County, Pennsylvania, United States. As of the 2020 census, the township population was 993, a decrease from the figure of 1,036 that was tabulated in 2010.

== Geography ==
This American township is located in northern Clarion County. It encompasses the unincorporated communities of Lucinda and Snydersburg.

The borough of Knox is an unrelated municipality that is located 12 miles (19 km) southwest of the township.

According to the United States Census Bureau, Knox Township has a total area of 16.1 square miles (41.6 km^{2}), of which 16.0 square miles (41.5 km^{2}) is land and 0.04 square miles (0.1 km^{2}), or 0.32%, is water.

== Demographics ==
Historical population
Census	Pop.	Note	%±
2010	1,036		—
2020	993		−4.2%
2022 (est.)	981		−1.2%
U.S. Decennial Census

As of the census of 2000, there were 1,045 people, 391 households, and 292 families residing in the township.

The population density was 60.8 inhabitants per square mile (23.5/km^{2}). There were 443 housing units at an average density of 25.8 per square mile (10.0/km^{2}).

The racial makeup of the township was 99.43% White, 0.38% Native American, 0.10% from other races, and 0.10% from two or more races. Hispanic or Latino of any race were 0.10% of the population.

There were 391 households, out of which 30.7% had children under the age of eighteen living with them; 66.2% were married couples living together, 5.1% had a female householder with no husband present, and 25.3% were non-families. 22.8% of all households were made up of individuals, and 10.5% had someone living alone who was sixty-five years of age or older.

The average household size was 2.67 and the average family size was 3.18.

Within the township, the population was spread out, with 23.7% who were under the age of eighteen, 8.4% who were aged eighteen to twenty-four, 27.4% who were aged twenty-five to forty-four, 26.5% who were aged forty-five to sixty-four, and 14.0% who were sixty-five years of age or older. The median age was forty years.

For every one hundred females there were 97.2 males. For every one hundred females who were aged eighteen or older, there were 97.3 males.

The median income for a household in the township was $40,521, and the median income for a family was $45,833. Males had a median income of $31,364 compared with that of $17,031 for females.

The per capita income for the township was $16,185.

Approximately 5.7% of families and 7.0% of the population were living below the poverty line, including 10.3% of those who were under the age of eighteen and 11.0% of those who were aged sixty-five or older.
