= Hugh Willingham =

American baseball player (1906–1988)

- Infielder
- Born: May 30, 1906; Dalhart, Texas, U.S.
- Died: June 15, 1988 (aged 82); El Reno, Oklahoma, U.S.
- Batted: Right Threw: Right

MLB debut
- September 13, 1930, for the Chicago White Sox

Last MLB appearance
- May 4, 1933, for the Philadelphia Phillies

MLB statistics
- Batting average: .238
- Home runs: 1
- Runs batted in: 3
- Stats at Baseball Reference

Teams
- Chicago White Sox (1930); Philadelphia Phillies (1931–1933)

Thomas Hugh Willingham (May 30, 1906 – June 15, 1988) was an American infielder in Major League Baseball. He played for the Chicago White Sox and Philadelphia Phillies.
