= Gainesville Owls =

Minor League baseball team in Texas

The Gainesville Owls were a Big State League (1947–1951) and Sooner State League (1953–1955) baseball team based in Gainesville, Texas, United States. They were affiliated with the Chicago Cubs from 1953 to 1955. Their home games were played at Locke Field.

During the 1955 season, they moved to Ponca City, Oklahoma to become the Ponca City Cubs.

They won one league championship, in 1951 under manager Hal Van Pelt.
