= Vern Hoscheit =

American baseball player (1922–2007)

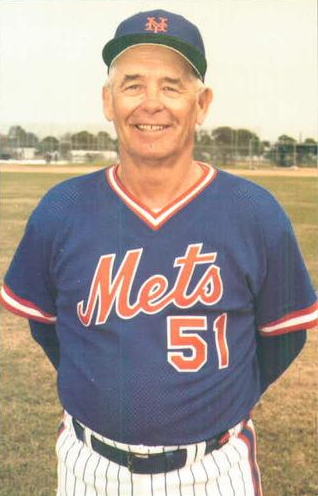
- Hoscheit with the New York Mets c. 1986
- Coach
- Born: April 1, 1922; Brunswick, Nebraska, U.S.
- Died: June 11, 2007 (aged 85); Pierce, Nebraska, U.S.
- Batted: Right Threw: Right
- Stats at Baseball Reference

Teams
- Baltimore Orioles (1968); Oakland Athletics (1969–1974); California Angels (1976); New York Mets (1984–1987)

Career highlights and awards
- 4× World Series champion (1972, 1973, 1974, 1986)

Vernard Arthur Hoscheit (April 1, 1922 – June 11, 2007) was an American professional baseball catcher, coach, and manager. He served as a coach on four World Series championship Major League Baseball (MLB) teams with the Oakland Athletics and New York Mets. Hoscheit was the Mets' bullpen coach from 1984 to 1987, which included their World Series championship run in 1986. During that season's spring training, he accurately predicted that the team would clinch the National League East Division title on September 17, long before any regular season game was even played.

== Career ==
=== Playing ===
Born in Brunswick, Nebraska, Hoscheit originally signed with the New York Yankees and was a catcher in their farm system for 12 seasons, starting in 1941. He missed the 1943–45 seasons because of World War II military service, but returned to hit .245 for the Binghamton Triplets in the Class A Eastern League, where his manager was Baseball Hall of Fame pitcher Lefty Gomez. Hoscheit also caught 25 games in 1947 for Binghamton while hitting .271. He hung on in the minor leagues until 1955, his best season being 1951, when he hit .354 with 11 home runs and 109 RBIs for the McAlester Rockets of Class D Sooner State League. Hoscheit managed in the lower levels of the Yankees' organization from 1948 to 1959.

=== Coaching and management ===
Hoscheit also was an executive in minor league baseball. He was the general manager for the Quincy (1955–56), Peoria (1957), and Greensboro (1958–59) clubs, concurrent with being their field manager, and then became president of the Three-I League in 1960.

After the Three-I League disbanded following the 1961 season, Hoscheit joined the Baltimore Orioles and was a scout and minor league instructor (1962–67) and major league coach (1968). He switched to Oakland and was a coach from 1969 to 1974, earning World Series rings in his final three seasons.

He coached for the California Angels (1976) and was the Mets' Gulf Coast League manager in 1983. With the parent team, he served as bullpen coach when New York won the 1986 World Series. He became a minor league catching instructor for the Mets in 1988.

In retirement, Hoscheit returned to his native Nebraska, where he coached American Legion teams in Plainview, Nebraska for many years including a state championship team in 1982. In 1983, he returned to the Mets to become their Gulf Coast League manager in 1983 and went on to receive his 4th World Series ring with the 1986 Mets as a bullpen coach.

== Death ==
He died at the Pierce Manor nursing home in Pierce, Nebraska on June 11, 2007.

Preceded by Sherm Lollar	Baltimore Orioles bullpen coach 1968	Succeeded by Charley Lau
