= Jimmy Adair =

American baseball player (1907–1982)

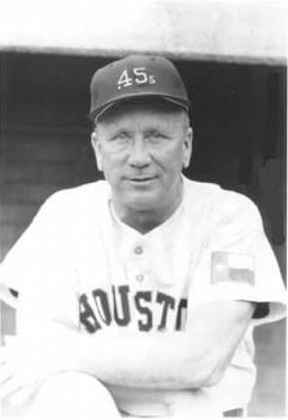
- Shortstop
- Born: January 25, 1907; Waxahachie, Texas, U.S.
- Died: December 9, 1982 (aged 75); Dallas, Texas, U.S.
- Batted: Right Threw: Right

MLB debut
- August 24, 1931, for the Chicago Cubs

Last MLB appearance
- September 7, 1931, for the Chicago Cubs

MLB statistics
- Batting average: .276
- Home runs: 0
- Runs batted in: 3
- Stats at Baseball Reference

Teams
- As player: Chicago Cubs (1931); As coach: Chicago White Sox (1951–1952); Baltimore Orioles (1957–1961); Houston Colt .45s/Astros (1962–1965)

James Aubrey Adair (January 25, 1907 – December 9, 1982) was an American professional baseball infielder, manager and coach. Although he played only briefly in Major League Baseball, as a shortstop for the 1931 Chicago Cubs, Adair had a long career as a minor league player and manager, and as a Major League coach and scout. A native of Waxahachie, Texas, he was associated for many years with a fellow townsman, Paul Richards, who as a manager or general manager employed Adair as a coach for three MLB teams.

== Playing career ==
Adair attended East Texas Baptist University and Marshall University. He batted and threw right-handed, and stood 5 ft 10 1/2 in (179.1 cm) tall and weighed 155 pounds (70 kg). His professional playing career began in 1927 with the Mexia, Texas, Gushers of the Class D Lone Star League, and by 1931 was playing at the top level of the minor leagues with the Reading Keystones of the AA International League. After batting .285, he was called up to the Cubs in August. Over the next month he appeared in eighteen games at shortstop, garnering 21 hits in 76 at bats—a batting average of .276—including three doubles and one triple, no home runs and three runs batted in. He then returned to the minors to forge a successful career as a second baseman for the Louisville Colonels of the Class AA American Association from 1932 to 1936, batting over .300 three times.

== Managerial career ==
In 1940, Adair became a manager for the first time as the playing skipper of the Longview Texans of the Class C East Texas League. After World War II, Adair worked in the farm systems of the St. Louis Browns and Philadelphia Athletics; he managed in the Double-A Texas League with the San Antonio Missions and Dallas Eagles in the late 1940s.

In 1951, Richards became manager of the Chicago White Sox and Adair served as one of his coaches for the 1951–52 seasons before resuming his minor league managing career. In 1957, Richards brought him back to the majors as a coach with the Baltimore Orioles. Adair spent five seasons under Richards in Baltimore (1957–61), and then followed Richards to the Houston Colt .45s/Astros for four more years (1962–65) as a member of the Houston coaching staff. After retiring from the field, Adair became a scout for the Kansas City and Oakland Athletics and the Kansas City Royals. He died from a heart attack at age 75 in Dallas, Texas.
