= Red Phillips (baseball) =

American baseball player (1908–1988)

- Pitcher
- Born: November 3, 1908; Pauls Valley, Oklahoma
- Died: February 1, 1988 (aged 79); Wichita, Kansas
- Batted: Right Threw: Right

MLB debut
- July 24, 1934, for the Detroit Tigers

Last MLB appearance
- September 23, 1936, for the Detroit Tigers

MLB statistics
- Win–loss record: 4–4
- Earned run average: 6.42
- Strikeouts: 18
- Stats at Baseball Reference

Teams
- Detroit Tigers (1934, 1936)

Clarence Lemuel "Red" Phillips (November 3, 1908 – February 1, 1988) was a professional baseball player. He was a right-handed pitcher over parts of two seasons (1934, 1936) with the Detroit Tigers. For his career, he compiled a 4–4 record, with a 6.42 earned run average, and 18 strikeouts in 110 2/3 innings pitched.

An alumnus of East Central University, he was born in Pauls Valley, Oklahoma and died in Wichita, Kansas at the age of 79.
