= Jennings Poindexter =

American baseball player (1910–1983)

Jennings Pointdexter
- Pitcher
- Born: September 30, 1910; Pauls Valley, Oklahoma, U.S.
- Died: March 3, 1983 (aged 72); Norman, Oklahoma, U.S.
- Batted: Left Threw: Left

MLB debut
- September 15, 1936, for the Boston Red Sox

Last MLB appearance
- June 7, 1939, for the Philadelphia Phillies

MLB statistics
- Win–loss record: 0–2
- Earned run average: 4.83
- Strikeouts: 14
- Stats at Baseball Reference

Teams
- Boston Red Sox (1936); Philadelphia Phillies (1939)

Chester Jennings Poindexter [Jinx] (September 30, 1910 – March 3, 1983) was an American pitcher in Major League Baseball who played for the Boston Red Sox (1936) and Philadelphia Phillies (1939). Listed at 5 ft 10 in (1.78 m), 165 lb (75 kg), Poindexter batted and threw left-handed. He was born in Pauls Valley, Oklahoma.

In a two-season-career, Poindexter posted a 0–2 record with a 4.83 ERA in 14 appearances, including one start, 14 strikeouts, 31 walks, and 41 innings of work.

Following baseball, Poindexter worked for Phillips Oil. He died in Norman, Oklahoma, at the age of 72.

== See also ==
- 1936 Boston Red Sox season
- 1939 Philadelphia Phillies season
