= Barney Lutz =

American baseball player, manager, and scout

- Outfielder / Manager / Scout
- Born: August 20, 1915; Lucinda, Pennsylvania, U.S.
- Died: July 11, 1966 (aged 50); Geneva, New York, U.S.
- Batted: Left Threw: Right
- Stats at Baseball Reference

Bernard Joseph "Barney" Lutz (August 20, 1915 – July 11, 1966) was an American professional baseball player, manager, scout and instructor. Primarily an outfielder in his playing days, he batted left-handed, threw right-handed, and was listed at 5 feet 10 inches (1.78 m) and 175 pounds (79 kg).

== Career ==
Lutz' minor league playing career extended from 1936 through 1954, with two seasons (1944 and 1945) missed because of World War II military service; he served in the United States Navy from April 1944 until January 1946. He briefly reached the Triple-A level twice, but spent most of his playing days in the middle rungs of the minor leagues. He became a player-manager in the Philadelphia Phillies' farm system in 1949. During his tenure with the Phillies, he had his best statistical season as the player-manager of the 1950 Bradford Phillies of the Class D Pennsylvania–Ontario–New York League (PONY League), batting .389 with 179 hits. In 1953, he switched to the St. Louis Browns' organization and remained in it when the Browns became the modern Baltimore Orioles of Major League Baseball in 1954. Defensively, he played over 900 games in the outfield; he also played some games at second base and third base, and pitched one inning.

Lutz focused on managing in the Baltimore system during 1955–1960, then became an Orioles scout and coordinator of instruction in 1961. He was considered one of the important behind-the-scenes figures of the Baltimore dynasty of the 1960s and 1970s. Said former MLB general manager Lou Gorman, "Lutz was a throw-back to the old-time scouting breed: tough, hardworking and loyal ... He was one of a kind."

Born in 1915 in Lucinda, Pennsylvania, Lutz died at age 50 in Geneva, New York, from a heart attack while scouting a New York–Penn League game, his death occurring during the Orioles' 1966 World Championship season. The Orioles created the Barney Lutz Memorial Award in his memory, given to an Orioles minor league player for excellence. The award's inaugural winner in 1968, then-minor league outfielder and future minor league manager Bill Scripture, later said, "Barney Lutz, before he died of a heart attack, was one of the most competitive men ever to have worn a uniform. I was glad someone recognized me and compared me to Lutz."
