= Dee Sanders =

American baseball player (1921–2007)

- Pitcher
- Born: April 8, 1921; Quitman, Texas
- Died: August 17, 2007 (aged 86); McAlester, Oklahoma
- Batted: Right Threw: Right

MLB debut
- August 12, 1945, for the St. Louis Browns

Last MLB appearance
- August 13, 1945, for the St. Louis Browns

MLB statistics
- Games pitched: 2
- Earned run average: 40.50
- Strikeouts: 1
- Stats at Baseball Reference

Teams
- St. Louis Browns (1945)

Dee Wilman Sanders (born April 8, 1921 – August 17, 2007), was a Major League Baseball pitcher who played in 1945 with the St. Louis Browns. He had signed with the Mexican Baseball League for the following season but soon decided against playing in Mexico. He batted and threw right-handed. Sanders had a 0–0 big league record, with a 40.50 ERA, in two games, in his one-year career. He attended the University of Oklahoma and lettered on the baseball team in 1942.
