= Joe Wood (pitcher) =

American baseball player (1916–2002)

- Pitcher
- Born: May 20, 1916; Shohola, Pennsylvania, U.S.
- Died: October 10, 2002 (aged 86); Old Saybrook, Connecticut, U.S.
- Batted: Right Threw: Right

MLB debut
- May 1, 1944, for the Boston Red Sox

Last MLB appearance
- May 14, 1944, for the Boston Red Sox

MLB statistics
- Win–loss record: 0-1
- Strikeouts: 5
- Earned run average: 6.52
- Stats at Baseball Reference

Teams
- Boston Red Sox (1944)

Joe Frank Wood (May 20, 1916 – October 10, 2002) was an American professional baseball pitcher. He appeared in three games in Major League Baseball for the Boston Red Sox during the 1944 season. Listed at 6 ft 0 in (1.83 m), 190 lb., Wood batted and threw right-handed.

== Biography ==
Wood was born in Shohola, Pennsylvania on May 20, 1916. His father, Smoky Joe Wood, also was a major league pitcher.

In three pitching appearances, including one start, Wood posted a 0–1 record with a 6.52 ERA, 13 hits allowed, five strikeouts, three walks, and 9 2/3 innings of work.

== Death ==
Wood died in Old Saybrook, Connecticut on October 10, 2002, at the age of 86.

== See also ==
- List of second-generation Major League Baseball players
