= Stan Galle =

American baseball player

- Third baseman
- Born: February 7, 1919; Milwaukee, Wisconsin, U.S.
- Died: January 28, 2006 (aged 86); Mobile, Alabama, U.S.
- Batted: Right Threw: Right

MLB debut
- April 14, 1942, for the Washington Senators

Last MLB appearance
- May 13, 1942, for the Washington Senators

MLB statistics
- Batting average: .111
- Home runs: 0
- Runs batted in: 1
- Stats at Baseball Reference

Teams
- Washington Senators (1942)

Stanley Joseph Galle (February 7, 1919 – January 28, 2006) was a third baseman in Major League Baseball. He played for the Washington Senators in 1942.
