= John Taber (baseball) =

American baseball player (1868–1940)

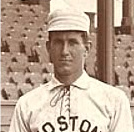
- Taber in 1890
- Pitcher
- Born: June 28, 1868; Acushnet, Massachusetts, U.S.
- Died: February 21, 1940 (aged 71); Boston, Massachusetts, U.S.
- Batted: Right Threw: Right

MLB debut
- April 30, 1890, for the Boston Beaneaters

Last MLB appearance
- July 8, 1890, for the Boston Beaneaters

MLB statistics
- Win–loss record: 0–1
- Earned run average: 4.15
- Strikeouts: 3
- Stats at Baseball Reference

Teams
- Boston Beaneaters (1890)

John Pardon Taber (June 28, 1868 – February 21, 1940) was an American pitcher in Major League Baseball who played two games for the Boston Beaneaters in 1890.
