= Bennie Warren =

American baseball player (1912-1994)

- Catcher
- Born: March 2, 1912; Elk City, Oklahoma, U.S.
- Died: May 11, 1994 (aged 82); Oklahoma City, Oklahoma, U.S.
- Batted: Right Threw: Right

MLB debut
- September 13, 1939, for the Philadelphia Phillies

Last MLB appearance
- September 28, 1947, for the New York Giants

MLB statistics
- Batting average: .219
- Home runs: 33
- Runs batted in: 104
- Stats at Baseball Reference

Teams
- Philadelphia Athletics (1939–1942); New York Giants (1946–1947)

Bernie Louis Warren (March 2, 1912, – May 11, 1994) was an American Major League Baseball player. Warren played for the Philadelphia Phillies from 1939 to 1942 and the New York Giants in 1946 and 1947. Warren served in the United States Navy during World War II from January 1943 to October 1945, missing playing time in the process.

He was born in Elk City, Oklahoma, and died in Oklahoma City.
