= Charlie Rabe =

American baseball player (born 1932)

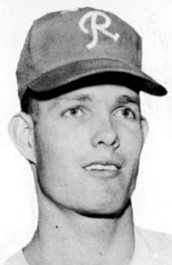
- Pitcher
- Born: May 6, 1932 (age 93); Boyce, Texas, U.S.
- Batted: Left Threw: Left

MLB debut
- September 21, 1957, for the Cincinnati Redlegs

Last MLB appearance
- June 4, 1958, for the Cincinnati Redlegs

MLB statistics
- Win–loss record: 0–4
- Earned run average: 3.67
- Strikeouts: 16
- Stats at Baseball Reference

Teams
- Cincinnati Redlegs (1957–1958)

Charles Henry Rabe (born May 6, 1932) is an American former professional baseball player. The left-handed pitcher and native of Boyce, Ellis County, Texas, appeared in 11 games in Major League Baseball for the 1957–1958 Cincinnati Redlegs. He was listed as 6 feet 1 inch (1.85 m) tall and 185 pounds (84 kg).

Rabe graduated from Waxahachie High School, alma mater of prominent baseball manager and front-office executive Paul Richards, and began his 12-year, ten-season pro career in the Cincinnati organization in 1952. After winning 16 of 26 decisions in 1957 for the top-level Seattle Rainiers of the Pacific Coast League, he was recalled in September by the Redlegs and used in two games. In the second, on September 27, he started against the eventual world champion Milwaukee Braves at Milwaukee County Stadium and held them to only five hits and two runs, striking out six, in seven full innings pitched. But the Redlegs could not solve Milwaukee's ace right-hander, Lew Burdette, and went down to defeat, 2–1. He began 1958 with Cincinnati and worked in nine games, including his second and last start, May 25 against the St. Louis Cardinals at Crosley Field; however, he lasted only three innings, gave up eight hits and four runs, and absorbed the 4–2 defeat. He made only one more MLB appearance before returning to the minors for the remainder of his career, which lasted through 1963.

In his 11 games with Cincinnati, Rabe posted an 0–4 won–lost record and 3.67 earned run average, allowing 30 hits and nine bases on balls in 27 innings pitched. He struck out 16.
