= Frank Mancuso =

American baseball player and politician (1918–2007)

- Mancuso autograph on a St. Louis Browns commemorative card (#23)

Member of the Houston City Council from the E District
- In office April 3, 1963 – January 2, 1994
- Preceded by: W.H. Jones
- Succeeded by: Joe Roach

Personal details
- Born: May 23, 1918 Houston, Texas, U.S.
- Died: August 4, 2007 (aged 89) Pasadena, Texas, U.S.
- Party: Independent
- Occupation: Baseball player, politician
- Baseball career
- Catcher
- Batted: Right Threw: Right

MLB debut
- April 18, 1944, for the St. Louis Browns

Last MLB appearance
- September 26, 1947, for the Washington Senators

MLB statistics
- Batting average: .241
- Home runs: 5
- Runs batted in: 98
- Stats at Baseball Reference

Teams
- St. Louis Browns (1944–1946); Washington Senators (1947)

Frank Octavius Mancuso (May 23, 1918 – August 4, 2007) was an American professional baseball player and, served as a Houston City Council member for 30 years after his sports career had ended. He played as a catcher in Major League Baseball from 1944 to 1947, most notably as a member of the only St. Louis Browns team to win an American League pennant in 1944. Listed at 6 ft 0 in (1.83 m), 195 lb., Mancuso batted and threw right-handed.

== Baseball career ==
Born in Houston, Texas, Mancuso began playing baseball in 1937 in the minor league system of the New York Giants. After hitting .417 for the Fort Smith Giants in 1938, the Giants moved him up to their major league roster for the entire 1939 season as a third string catcher, but he did not get into a single game during the regular season. That disappointment was offset by the opportunity he had to warm up pitcher Carl Hubbell, and sharing the company of other great Giants like OF Mel Ott and manager Bill Terry. He was sent back to the minors before the 1940 season.

After hitting .300 or more in three minor league seasons, Mancuso entered the U.S. Army as a paratrooper at Fort Benning, Georgia in December 1942 and was on his way to an accident that forever altered the course of his baseball career. In 1943, he suffered a broken back and leg when his chute opened late and improperly. He almost died from his injuries and was subsequently discharged from the service for medical reasons. A part of his injury was an unfortunate condition for a catcher, where in looking straight up caused him to lose the flow of oxygen to the brain, and he would pass out. As a result, he never regained all of his mobility after the parachute jump and was never responsible for catching pop-ups.

Mancuso spent the rest of his life with back and legs pains, but he worked himself back into shape and returned to baseball in 1944 as one of two catchers for the only St. Louis Browns club to ever win an American League pennant. He shared duties with Red Hayworth, hitting .205 with a home run and 24 RBI in 88 games. The Browns lost to the St. Louis Cardinals in the 1944 World Series in six games, but Mancuso hit .667 (2-for-3) and collected one RBI in injury-limited pinch-hitting duty. His most productive season came in 1945, when he posted career-numbers in games (119), batting average (.268), RBI (38) and runs (39). In 1946 he hit .240 with a career-high three home runs in 87 games. He played his last major-league season with the Washington Senators in 1947 at the age of 29.

From 1948 to 1955, Mancuso earned further respect as a catcher for top minor league clubs like Toledo and Beaumont, among others, and with the 1953 Houston Buffs, a minors club that preceded the Colt .45s / Astros. He also played winter baseball in the Venezuelan League during the 1950–51 and 1951–52 seasons. In his first season, he hit .407 with 49 RBI and also became the first player in the league to hit 10 home runs in a 42-game schedule.

In a four-year major league career, Mancuso played in 337 games, accumulating 241 hits in 1,002 at bats for a .241 career batting average along with 5 home runs, 98 runs batted in and a .314 on-base percentage. He posted a .987 fielding percentage as a catcher. In his 17-year minor league career, he played in 1,267 games, accumulating 1,087 hits in 3,936 at bats for a .276 career batting average along with 128 home runs.

== Political career ==
After baseball retirement, Mancuso served for 30 consecutive years (1963–93) on the Houston City Council. In the late 1990s, Harris County built the Frank Mancuso Sports Complex, a facility that strategically reaches out to the needs of inner city kids, in his honor. The Mancuso Neighborhood Library is also named after him. His 2003 induction into the Texas Baseball Hall of Fame reunited him with his older brother, Gus Mancuso (1905–1984), as the second member of the family to be inducted.

Mancuso died in Pasadena, Texas at the age of 89. His older brother, Gus Mancuso, also played in Major League Baseball as a catcher.
