= McAlester Rockets =

- 1947–1956; (1905, 1907–1908, 1912, 1914–1917, 1922–1923, 1926, 1947–1956); McAlester, Oklahoma

Minor league affiliations
- Class: Class D (1905, 1907–1908, 1912, 1914–1917); Class C (1922–1923, 1926); Class D (1947–1956)
- League: Missouri Valley League (1905); South Central League (1906); Oklahoma-Arkansas-Kansas League (1907); Oklahoma-Kansas League (1908); Oklahoma State League (1912, 1924); Western Association (1914–1917, 1922–1923, 1926); Sooner State League (1947–1956)

Major league affiliations
- Team: New York Yankees (1947–1956)

Minor league titles
- League titles (5): 1947; 1950; 1951; 1952; 1953
- Wild card berths (5): 1947; 1950; 1951; 1953; 1954

Team data
- Name: South McAlester Giants (1905); South McAlester Miners (1906); McAlester Miners (1907–1908, 1912, 1914–1917, 1922, 1926); McAlester Rockets (1947–1956)
- Ballpark: Krebs Park (1905–1906); League Park (1907–1908, 1912, 1914); Interurban Park (1915–1917); Fairgrounds Park (1922–1923, 1926); Jeff Lee Stadium (1936–1956)

The McAlester Rockets were a minor league baseball team based in McAlester, Oklahoma. Between 1907 and 1926, previous McAlester teams played as members of the 1905 Missouri Valley League, 1906 South Central League, 1907 Oklahoma-Arkansas-Kansas League, 1908 Oklahoma-Kansas League, the Oklahoma State League in 1912 and 1924 and Western Association (1914–1917, 1922–1923, 1926). The Rockets played as members of the Class D level Sooner State League from 1947 to 1956, winning five league championships as an affiliate of the New York Yankees. The Rockets hosted home games at Jeff Lee Stadium.

Baseball Hall of Fame member Deacon White managed the 1907 McAlester Miners and fellow Hall of Famer Whitey Herzog played for the McAlester Rockets in 1949 and 1950.

== History ==
The McAlester Rockets played as members of the Class D level Sooner State League from 1947 to 1956. They were affiliates of the New York Yankees (1954–1957) and captured five league championships in a seven season span, winning titles in 1947 and four consecutive from 1950 to 1953.

Previously, McAlester hosted numerous minor league teams. The McAlester Diggers (1923–1924), McAlester Miners (1907–1908, 1912, 1914–1917, 1922, 1926), South McAlester Miners (1906) and South McAlester Giants (1905) played as members of the Missouri Valley League (1905), South Central League (1906), Oklahoma-Arkansas-Kansas League (1907), Oklahoma-Kansas League (1908), Oklahoma State League (1912), Western Association (1914–1917, 1922–1923, 1926) and Oklahoma State League (1924). The McAlester Miners won the Western Association Championship in 1917.

=== Whitey Herzog (1949–1950) ===
Baseball Hall of Fame inductee Dorrel "Whitey" Herzog played his first professional season for the McAlester Rockets in 1949. Herzog hit .279 with 0 home runs and 111 hits in 96 games. He played for the Rockets again in 1950, hitting .351, with 161 hits and 4 home runs. It is said that Herzog received his nickname "Whitey" while playing for McAlester.

== The ballparks ==
The McAlester Rockets played home minor league games at Jeff Lee Stadium for their duration. It is known today as Hook Eales Stadium, after the site was purchased by McAlester public schools from the city of McAlester. The site of a regional Works Project Administration office, a WPA project to build an armory and Jeff Lee Pool were completed in 1936, with Jeff Lee Stadium opening in 1937. The Rockets drew between 40,000 and 63,000 every season, except for the 23,000 in their final season of 1956. Today, Hook Eales Stadium is utilized by McAlester Buffaloes high school sports teams. It is located at 1261 North 6th Street, McAlester, Oklahoma.

Previous McAlester teams played at venues of several different names. When professional baseball first arrived in the area, although the team was identified as being from South McAlester, its games were played in the nearby town of Krebs. This venue was called Krebs Park. A 1905 city directory locates the league park along the interurban railway in Krebs, which followed a roadbed that is now Electric Avenue. A fairground for early editions of the Pittsburg County Fair was also located there.

After the town of South McAlester merged into McAlester in 1906, the team name changed from "South McAlester" to "McAlester" and the playing field moved from Krebs to an area on the south side of McAlester that would eventually become the new county fairgrounds. The new field was called League Park. The new League Park was located at the southern terminus of the Second Ward streetcar line. By 1910, the county fairgrounds had also been relocated to this site. Prior to hosting the fairgrounds, the site, located on the southeast corner of South Avenue and South 11th Street (now Strong Boulevard), had been home to the McAlester Driving Association Park. Fans accessing the ballpark by streetcar disembarked at the terminal station located at Seneca Avenue and South 11th, then walked approximately one block south to the fairgrounds along South Avenue.

In 1915 a new Western Association ballpark was built on the McAlester end of the streetcar line, which was referred to as Interurban Park. When professional baseball returned in 1922, another new grandstand was built on the same fairgrounds site, which could be accessed either by streetcar or by automobile along a newly-paved stretch of Seneca Avenue from South 6th to the terminal station at South 11th.

== Season–by–season ==
Year	Record	Win–loss %	Manager	Finish	Playoffs/Notes
1947	73–67	.521	William Nebroak	3rd	League champions
1948	91–47	.659	Vern Hoscheit	1st	Lost in league finals
1949	58–82	.414	Vern Hoscheit	6th	Did not qualify
1950	92–48	.657	Vern Hoscheit	2nd	League champions
1951	91–48	.655	Vern Hoscheit	3rd	League champions
1952	87–53	.621	William Cope	1st	League champions
1953	83–56	.597	William Cope	4th	League champions
1954	76–64	.543	Bunny Mick	3rd	Lost in 1st round
1955	65–75	.464	Marvin Crater	6th	Did not qualify
1956	60–79	.432	Marvin Crater	7th	Did not qualify

== Notable alumni ==
- Whitey Herzog (1949–1950) Inducted Baseball Hall of Fame, 2010
- Vern Hoscheit (1948–1951, MGR)
- Rod Kanehl (1954)
- Don Leppert (1949–1950)
- Jerry Lumpe (1951) MLB All–Star
- Jack McMahan (1952)
- Phil Mudrock (1956)
- Marshall Renfroe (1956)
- Dee Sanders (1951)
- Norm Siebern (1951) 4x MLB All-Star
- Russ Snyder (1953)
- Jack Urban (1949–1950)
- Mel Wright (1950)

== See also ==
- McAlester Rockets players
