= Louis Brower =

American baseball player (1900–1994)

- Shortstop
- Born: July 1, 1900; Cleveland, Ohio, U.S.
- Died: March 4, 1994 (aged 93); Tyler, Texas, U.S.
- Batted: Right Threw: Right

MLB debut
- June 13, 1931, for the Detroit Tigers

Last MLB appearance
- July 27, 1931, for the Detroit Tigers

MLB statistics
- Batting average: .161
- Hits: 10
- Runs batted in: 6
- Stats at Baseball Reference

Teams
- Detroit Tigers (1931)

Louis Lester Brower (July 1, 1900 – March 4, 1994) was an American Major League Baseball player. Brower was a shortstop for the Detroit Tigers in the 1931 season. He had a .161 batting average, with ten hits in 62 at bats. He played 21 games in his one-year career.

Brower was born in Cleveland, Ohio and died in Tyler, Texas, and was Jewish.
