= Shawnee Hawks =

- 1947–1957; Shawnee, Oklahoma

Minor league affiliations
- Previous classes: Class D
- League: Sooner State League

Major league affiliations
- Previous teams: Brooklyn Dodgers (1953–1957)

Team data
- Previous names: Shawnee Hawks (1950–1957); Duncan Uttmen (1949–1950); Duncan Cementers (1947–1948)

The Shawnee Hawks were a minor league baseball team that played in the Sooner State League. The team began as an unaffiliated team based in Duncan, Oklahoma in 1947. The original team was named the Duncan Cementers.

After two seasons, the team name was changed to the Duncan Uttmen in 1949 and then in 1950 the team moved to Shawnee, Oklahoma and became the Hawks. They continued to operate until the Sooner State League folded after the 1957 season.

The Hawks were affiliated with the Brooklyn Dodgers from 1953–1957.
