= 1947 St. Louis Browns season =

Major League Baseball season

1947 St. Louis Browns
- League: American League
- Ballpark: Sportsman's Park
- City: St. Louis, Missouri
- Record: 59–95 (.383)
- League place: 8th
- Owners: Richard Muckerman
- General managers: Bill DeWitt
- Managers: Muddy Ruel
- Radio: WIL (Dizzy Dean, Johnny O'Hara)

The 1947 St. Louis Browns season was the Major League Baseball franchise's 47th in the American League (AL) and its 46th in St. Louis. The 1947 Browns finished eighth and last in the league with a record of 59 wins and 95 losses, 38 games in arrears of the eventual World Series champion New York Yankees. The Browns were managed by Muddy Ruel in the former catcher's only stint as an MLB pilot, and drew only 320,474 fans to Sportsman's Park, 16th and last in the majors. On July 17, they became the third big-league team to racially integrate its ranks. However, the experiment failed when the two pioneer players, Hank Thompson and Willard Brown, were sent back to the Negro leagues in late August; the Browns would not field another African-American player until all-time great Satchel Paige joined them in July 1951.

== Regular season ==
- July 17: Hank Thompson became the first black player to appear in a game for the Browns.
- July 20: Hank Thompson and Willard Brown of the Browns played against the Boston Red Sox. It was the first time that two black players appear in a major league game together since 1884. In that first game of the double-header, outfielder Paul Lehner hit an inside-the-park grand slam to drive in all four runs in the Browns' 4–3 victory.
- September 28: Broadcaster Dizzy Dean comes out of retirement to pitch for the Browns. He pitches 4 scoreless innings and hits a single.

=== Season standings ===
American League
Team	W	L	Pct.	GB	Home	Road
New York Yankees	97	57	.630	—	55‍–‍22	42‍–‍35
Detroit Tigers	85	69	.552	12	46‍–‍31	39‍–‍38
Boston Red Sox	83	71	.539	14	49‍–‍30	34‍–‍41
Cleveland Indians	80	74	.519	17	38‍–‍39	42‍–‍35
Philadelphia Athletics	78	76	.506	19	39‍–‍38	39‍–‍38
Chicago White Sox	70	84	.455	27	32‍–‍43	38‍–‍41
Washington Senators	64	90	.416	33	36‍–‍41	28‍–‍49
St. Louis Browns	59	95	.383	38	29‍–‍48	30‍–‍47

=== Record vs. opponents ===
1947 American League record Sources:
Team	BOS	CWS	CLE	DET	NYY	PHA	SLB	WSH
Boston	—	16–6–1	9–13	12–10–1	9–13	10–12–1	15–7	12–10
Chicago	6–16–1	—	11–11	7–15	10–12	11–11	11–11	14–8
Cleveland	13–9	11–11	—	8–14–2	7–15	11–11–1	17–5	13–9
Detroit	10–12–1	15–7	14–8–2	—	8–14–1	11–11	15–7	12–10
New York	13–9	12–10	15–7	14–8–1	—	13–9	15–7	15–7
Philadelphia	12–10–1	11–11	11–11–1	11–11	9–13	—	13–9	11–11
St. Louis	7–15	11–11	5–17	7–15	7–15	9–13	—	13–9
Washington	10–12	8–14	9–13	10–12	7–15	11–11	9–13	—

=== Roster ===
1947 St. Louis Browns
Roster
Pitchers: 36 Walter Brown; 31 Dizzy Dean; 28 Cliff Fannin; 22 Denny Galehouse; 31 Hooks Iott; 26 Ellis Kinder; 21 Jack Kramer; 23 Glen Moulder; 44 Bob Muncrief; 27 Nels Potter; 25 Fred Sanford; 31 Bud Swartz; 24 Sam Zoldak	Catchers: 8 Jake Early; 10 Les Moss; Infielders: 4 Johnny Berardino; 15 Perry Currin; 6 Bob Dillinger; 2 Billy Hitchcock; 18 Wally Judnich; 3,40 Rusty Peters; 5 Vern Stephens; 7 Hank Thompson; 7 Jerry Witte	Outfielders: 15 Willard Brown; 19 Ray Coleman; 20 Jeff Heath; 17 Paul Lehner; 14 Al Zarilla; Other batters: 15 Glenn McQuillen; 11 Joe Schultz	Manager: 51 Muddy Ruel; Coaches: 30 Earle Combs; 33 Fred Hofmann; -- Jack Tobin

== Player stats ==
=== Batting ===
==== Starters by position ====
Note: Pos = Position; G = Games played; AB = At bats; H = Hits; Avg. = Batting average; HR = Home runs; RBI = Runs batted in

Pos	Player	G	AB	H	Avg.	HR	RBI
C	Les Moss	96	274	43	.157	6	27
1B	Wally Judnich	144	500	129	.258	18	64
2B	Johnny Berardino	90	306	80	.261	1	20
3B	Bob Dillinger	137	571	168	.294	3	37
SS	Vern Stephens	150	562	157	.279	15	83
OF	Al Zarilla	127	380	85	.224	3	38
OF	Paul Lehner	135	483	120	.248	7	48
OF	Jeff Heath	141	491	123	.251	27	85

==== Other batters ====
Note: G = Games played; AB = At bats; H = Hits; Avg. = Batting average; HR = Home runs; RBI = Runs batted in

Player	G	AB	H	Avg.	HR	RBI
Ray Coleman	110	343	89	.259	2	30
Billy Hitchcock	80	275	61	.222	1	28
Jake Early	87	214	48	.224	3	19
Jerry Witte	34	99	14	.141	2	12
Hank Thompson	27	78	20	.256	0	5
Willard Brown	21	67	12	.179	1	6
Rusty Peters	39	47	16	.340	0	2
Joe Schultz Jr.	43	38	7	.184	1	1
Perry Currin	3	2	0	.000	0	0
Glenn McQuillen	1	1	0	.000	0	0

=== Pitching ===
==== Starting pitchers ====
Note: G = Games pitched; IP = Innings pitched; W = Wins; L = Losses; ERA = Earned run average; SO = Strikeouts

Player	G	IP	W	L	ERA	SO
Jack Kramer	33	199.1	11	16	4.97	77
Ellis Kinder	34	194.1	8	15	4.49	110
Fred Sanford	34	186.2	7	16	3.71	62
Bob Muncrief	31	176.1	8	14	4.90	74
Cliff Fannin	26	145.2	6	8	3.58	77
Dizzy Dean	1	4.0	0	0	0.00	0

==== Other pitchers ====
Note: G = Games pitched; IP = Innings pitched; W = Wins; L = Losses; ERA = Earned run average; SO = Strikeouts

Player	G	IP	W	L	ERA	SO
Sam Zoldak	35	171.0	9	10	3.47	36
Nels Potter	32	122.2	4	10	4.04	65
Denny Galehouse	9	32.1	1	3	6.12	11

==== Relief pitchers ====
Note: G = Games pitched; W = Wins; L = Losses; SV = Saves; ERA = Earned run average; SO = Strikeouts

Player	G	W	L	SV	ERA	SO
Glen Moulder	32	4	2	2	3.82	23
Walter Brown	19	1	0	0	4.89	10
Bud Swartz	5	0	0	0	6.75	1
Hooks Iott	4	0	1	0	16.20	6

== Farm system ==
Level	Team	League	Manager
AAA	Toledo Mud Hens	American Association	Frank Snyder
AA	San Antonio Missions	Texas League	Jimmy Adair and Marc Carrola
A	Elmira Pioneers	Eastern League	Ralph Winegarner
B	Springfield Browns	Illinois–Indiana–Iowa League	Bennie Huffman
C	Globe-Miami Browns	Arizona–Texas League	Lloyd Brown
C	Gloversville-Johnstown Glovers	Canadian–American League	Packy Rogers
C	Hannibal Pilots	Central Association	Herb Nordquist
C	Aberdeen Pheasants	Northern League	Don Heffner
C	Muskogee Reds	Western Association	Ray Baker
D	Baton Rouge Red Sticks	Evangeline League	Eddie Moore
D	Belleville Stags	Illinois State League	Walt DeFreitas
D	Pittsburg Browns	Kansas–Oklahoma–Missouri League	Jim Crandall
D	Mayfield Clothiers	KITTY League	Shan Deniston
D	Newark Moundsmen	Ohio State League	Ed Dancisak
D	Ada Herefords	Sooner State League	Uke Clanton
D	Wausau Lumberjacks	Wisconsin State League	Joe Skurski

LEAGUE CHAMPIONS: Belleville
