= Chanute Athletics =

- 1947–1950; (1896, 1902, 1906, 1946–1950); Chanute, Kansas

Minor league affiliations
- Class: Class D (1902, 1906, 1946–1950)
- League: Kansas State League (1896); Missouri Valley League (1902); Kansas State League (1906); Kansas-Oklahoma-Missouri League (1946–1950)

Major league affiliations
- Team: New York Giants (1948)

Minor league titles
- League titles (1): 1946
- Wild card berths (0): None

Team data
- Name: Chanute (1896); Chanute Oilers (1902); Chanute Browns (1906); Chanute Owls (1946); Chanute Athletics (1947); Chanute Giants (1948); Chanute Athletics (1949–1950)
- Ballpark: Katy Park (1946–1950)

The Chanute Athletics were a minor league baseball team based in Chanute, Kansas between 1947 and 1950. With the Athletics preceded by teams under varying nicknames, Chanute teams played as members of the Class D level Kansas State League in 1896, Missouri Valley League in 1902, Kansas State League in 1906 and Kansas-Oklahoma-Missouri League from 1946 to 1950, winning the 1946 league championship.

The Chanute "Giants" played as a minor league affiliate of the New York Giants in 1948.

From 1946 to 1950, Chanute hosted minor league games at Katy Park.

== History ==
=== Early Chanute teams ===
Chanute, Kansas first hosted minor league baseball in 1896, playing as members of the Kansas State League. The Chanute Oilers played in the 1902 Missouri Valley League, formed when the Coffeyville Indians moved to Chanute on June 23, 1902. The Chanute Browns were members of the 1906 Kansas State League. On May 18, 1906, Chanute pitcher James McClintock threw a losing no–hitter against Fort Scott Giants in a 3–0 Fort Scott victory.

=== 1946 to 1950: Kansas-Oklahoma-Missouri League ===
Chanute played in the Class D level Kansas-Oklahoma-Missouri League from 1946 to 1950 and were affiliates of the New York Giants in 1948. Chanute won the league Kansas-Oklahoma-Missouri League championship in 1946.

Minor league baseball returned to Chanute in 1946, when the Chanute "Owls" became charter members of the Kansas-Oklahoma-Missouri League, winning the league pennant and tying for the league championship. Chanute finished with a 68–53 record in the 1946 Kansas-Oklahoma-Missouri League regular season, to capture the league pennant. Chanute finished just percentage points ahead of the Miami Blues (69–54) in the final regular season standings. In the four-team playoffs, the Oilers defeated the Pittsburg Browns 3 games to 2 in their first playoff series. In the 1946 Finals, Chanute was tied with the Iola Cubs 3 games to 3 when the series was halted due to weather and a lack of available grounds. Chanute's Richard Bulkley led the league in scoring 111 runs. Pitcher Ross Grmisley had a league leading 295 strikeouts and 1.95 ERA, best in the league.

In 1947, the Chanute Athletics ended the season with a record of 44–80, placing seventh in the Kansas-Oklahoma-Missouri League, finishing 31.5 games behind the first place Miami Owls. The managers were Dave Dennis and Charlie Bates. Playing at Katy Park, Chanute drew total season attendance of 34,758, an average of 561 per home game.

The Chanute franchise became an affiliate of the New York Giants in 1948, continuing play in the Kansas-Oklahoma-Missouri League. The newly named Chanute Giants finished in eighth place and last with a 44–78 record, playing the season under manager Al Smith. The Giants finished 33.0 games behind the 1first place Ponca City Dodgers and drew 32,561 in total season attendance. William Fox of Chanute won the league batting title, hitting .327.

In 1949, the Chanute Athletics finished with a 65–60 record, placing fifth in the Kansas-Oklahoma-Missouri League regular season standings, finishing 6.5 games behind the first place Independence Yankees, with Mickey Mantle. The 1949 Chanute Athletics managers were James Hansen and Charles Bates. Chanute season attendance was 39,228 total, an average of 628 per home game. Chanute pitcher Jake Thies led the Kansas-Oklahoma-Missouri League with 18 wins.

In their final season, the 1950 Chanute Athletics finished last in the Kansas-Oklahoma-Missouri League. Chanute had a record of 35–80, finishing in eighth place, under managers Charles Bates, Tom Imfeld and Chuck Hostetler. The Athletics finished 46.0 games behind the first place Ponca City Dodgers. The Athletics' 1950 total season attendance at Katy Park was 21,372, an average of 345 per game.

The Chanute franchise permanently folded after the 1950 season, as the Kansas-Oklahoma-Missouri League reduced teams and played as a six–team league in 1951.

== The ballpark ==
The Chanute Athletics teams were noted to have played minor league home games at Katy Park. Built in 1936 as a Works Project Administration project, Katy Park had a capacity of 3,500 in 1946, 2,500 in 1948 and 1,500 in 1950. Mickey Mantle played in Chanute in 1949, as a member of visiting Independence Yankees. Katy Park is still in use today as a public park. It is located on South Katy Avenue at the end of East 4th Street.

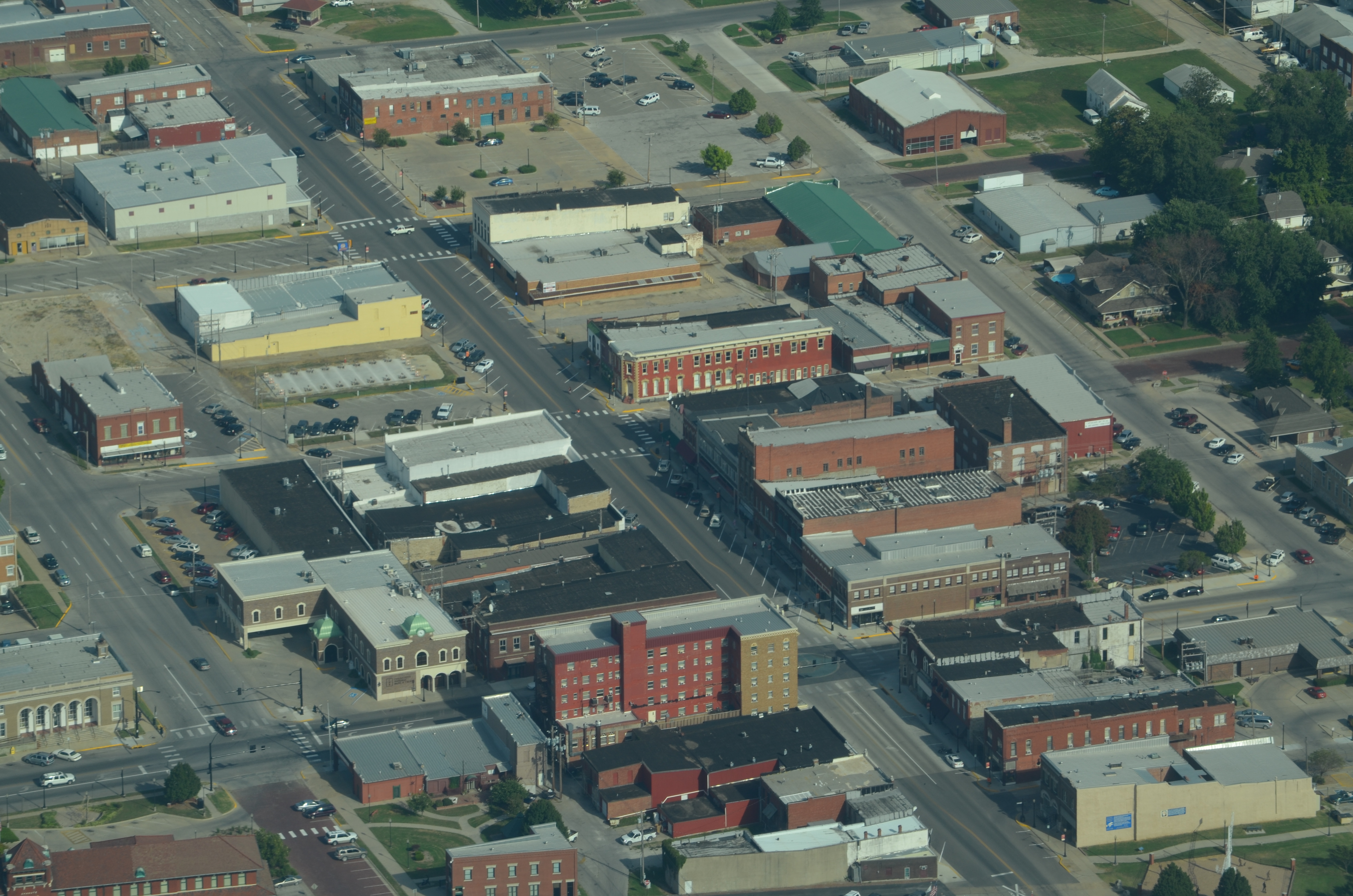
(2013) Chanute, Kansas

== Timeline ==
Year(s)	# Yrs.	Team	Level	League	Ballpark
1896	1	Chanute	Independent	Kansas State League	Unknown
1902	1	Chanute Oilers	Class D	Missouri Valley League	Unknown
1906	1	Chanute Browns	Class D	Kansas State League	Unknown
1946–1947	2	Chanute Athletics	Class D	Kansas-Oklahoma-Missouri League	Katy Park
1948	1	Chanute Giants	Class D	Kansas-Oklahoma-Missouri League	Katy Park
1949–1950	2	Chanute Athletics	Class D	Kansas-Oklahoma-Missouri League	Katy Park

== Season-by-season records ==
Year	Record	Win–loss %	Manager	Finish	Playoff/note
1946	68–53	.561	Goldie Howard	1st	Championship series tied 3-3
1947	44–80	.354	Dave Dennis / Charlie Bates	7th	Did not qualify
1948	44–78	.360	Al Smith	8th	Did not qualify
1949	65–60	.520	James Hansen / Charlie Bates	5th	Did not qualify
1950	35–89	.282	Charlie Bates /Thomas Imfeld / Chuck Hostetler	8th	Did not qualify

== Notable alumni ==
- Charlie Bates (1947, 1949-1950, MGR)
- Ross Grimsley (1946)
- Chuck Hostetler (1950, MGR)
- Johnny Kling (1896)
- Al Smith (1948, MGR) MLB All-Star
- Jake Thies (1947-1949)
- Bill Yohe (1906)

== See also ==
- Chanute Athletics players
- Chanute (minor league baseball) players
- Chanute Owls players
