= Independence Champs =

Kansas baseball team

Independence Coyotes
- 1907; Independence, Kansas

Minor league affiliations
- Class: Class D
- League: Oklahoma–Arkansas–Kansas League
- Previous leagues: Kansas State League (1906)

Team data
- Previous names: Independence Coyotes (1906)

The Independence Champs were a Class-D minor league baseball team based in Independence, Kansas that played in the Oklahoma–Arkansas–Kansas League (OAK League) in 1907.

The team formed in 1906 as the Independence Coyotes, in the Kansas State League. They moved to the OAK League when the KSL folded after the 1906 season. The OAK League folded after the 1907 season, with Independence and fellow OAK League members Bartlesville and Muskogee moving to the new Oklahoma–Kansas League for the 1908 season.

Multiple notable players spent time with the team, including Chick Brandom, Drummond Brown, Dick Crutcher, Danny Friend and Marc Hall.

== Timeline ==
Year(s)	# Yrs.	Team	Level	League	Affiliate
1896	1	Independence	Independent	Kansas State League	None
1906	1	Independence Coyotes	Class D	Kansas State League	None
1907	1	Independence Champs	Class D	Oklahoma-Arkansas-Kansas League	None
1908	1	Independence Jewelers	Class D	Oklahoma-Kansas League	None
1911	1	Independence Packers	Class D	Western Association	None
1921	1	Independence Producers	Class D	Southwestern League	None
1922–1923	2	Independence Producers	Class C	Southwestern League	None
1924	1	Independence Producers	Class D	Southwestern League	None
1925, 1928–1932	6	Independence Producers	Class C	Western Association	None
1947–1950	4	Independence Yankees	Class D	Kansas-Oklahoma-Missouri League	New York Yankees
1952	1	Independence Browns	Class D	Kansas-Oklahoma-Missouri League	St. Louis Browns
