= Pittsburg Browns =

- 1946–1951; Pittsburg, Kansas

Minor league affiliations
- Class: Class D (1946–1951)
- League: Kansas-Oklahoma-Missouri League (1946–1951)

Major league affiliations
- Team: St. Louis Browns (1946–1951)

Minor league titles
- League titles (0): None
- Wild card berths (4): 1946; 1947; 1948; 1950

Team data
- Name: Pittsburg Browns (1946–1951)
- Ballpark: Jaycee Park (1946–1951)

The Pittsburg Browns were a minor league baseball team based in Pittsburg, Kansas. From 1946 to 1951, the Browns played as members of the Class D level Kansas-Oklahoma-Missouri League as a minor league affiliate of the St. Louis Browns, winning the 1946 league championship. The Browns hosted home minor league games at Jaycee Park.

== History ==
The Browns were preceded in minor league play by the 1921 Pittsburg Pirates, who played the season as members of the Class D level Southwestern League. Pittsburgh became charter members of the six team, Class D level Kansas-Oklahoma-Missouri League in 1946, playing as a minor league affiliate of the St. Louis Browns. The Bartlesville Oilers, Carthage Cardinals, Chanute Owls, Iola Cubs and Miami Blues joined the Browns in beginning league play on May 1, 1946.

The Pittsburg Browns were charter members of the 1946 Kansas-Oklahoma-Missouri League and qualified for the playoffs in their first season of play. The Browns ended the regular season with a record of 61–59 to place fourth. Playing under manager Jimmie Crandall, Pittsburg finished 6.5 games behind the first place Chanute Owls. In the playoffs, Chanute defeated Pittsburg three games to two in the first round playoff series.

In 1947, the Browns continued league play and ended the season in second place tie, as the Kansas-Oklahoma-Missouri League expanded to eight teams. Ending the regular season with a record of 69–54, Pittsburg finished 6.0 games behind the first place Miami Owls and had an identical record to the Iola Cubs. Managed by the returning Jimmie Crandall, the Browns lost to Iola in the first round of the playoffs, three games to one. Pitcher Jim Post of Pittsburg led the league with a winning PCT of .813, with a 13-3 record.

The Browns advanced to the playoff Finals in the 1948 Kansas-Oklahoma-Missouri League. Pittsburg ended the regular season in fourth place in the eight-team league, playing under managers Shan Deniston and Don Smith. In January 1948, St. Louis Browns business manager J. W. Baker had hired Deniston to be the player-manager for the Browns after Jim Crandall left to manage the Aberdeen Pheasants of the Northern League. Denison appeared in a total of 48 games before resigning mid-season to return to Pepperdine University. "When I left the club early to go back to Pepperdine it was three games out of first," Deniston later said. "Then it lost the next sixteen in a row." His position was filled in by Donald Smith. With a 60–60 record, the Browns finished 16.0 games behind the first place Ponca City Dodgers and advanced to the four team playoffs. In the playoffs, Pittsburg defeated Ponca City Dodgers three games to two. In the Finals the Browns lost to the Independence Yankees four games to one. Charles Sturnborg of Pittsburg led the Kansas-Oklahoma-Missouri League with both 13 home runs and 78 RBI.

In 1949, the Pittsburg Browns finished last in the Kansas-Oklahoma-Missouri League regular season standings. The Browns ended the season with a 39–85 record, placing 8th in the Kansas-Oklahoma-Missouri League regular season standings, finishing 32.0 games behind the 1st place Independence Yankees, with Mickey Mantle. The 1949 Chanute Athletics managers were Albert Barkus and Olan Smith.

The 1950 Pittsburg Browns returned to the Kansas-Oklahoma-Missouri League playoffs. Pittsburg had a regular record of 71–52, finishing in fourth place, playing the season under managers Olan Smith and Jimmie Crandall. The Browns finished 9.5 games behind the first place Ponca City Dodgers. In the playoffs, Ponca City beat Pittsburg Browns three games to two.

The Browns played their final season in 1951, as the Kansas-Oklahoma-Missouri League played the season as a six–team league. Pittsburg ended the Kansas-Oklahoma-Missouri League ended the 1951 season with a record of 41-80, placing fifth and finishing 42.5 games behind the first place Ponca City Dodgers. Bill Enos served as manager. Robert Ottesen of Pittsburg led the league with 89 RBI.

Replaced by the Blackwell Broncos franchise in league play, Pittsburg did not return to the 1952 Kansas-Oklahoma-Missouri League to begin the season. Pittsburg then regained a franchise during the season. On July 7, 1952, the Bartlesville Pirates, an affiliate of the Pittsburgh Pirates, relocated to finish their 1952 season in as the Pittsburg Pirates. The Kansas-Oklahoma-Missouri League permanently folded following the 1952 season. Pittsburg has not hosted another minor league team.

== The ballpark ==
The Pittsburg Browns hosted minor league home games at Jaycee Park. The ballpark was preceded by the "Pittsburg Ball Park." Built in 1940, Jaycee Park is still in use today. Prior to original construction, the Pittsburg Junior Chamber of Commerce (the Jaycees) purchased the property, which was adjacent to Lincoln Park. The land was deeded to the City of Pittsburg, and the ballpark was constructed by the Works Projects Administration. The first game was held on July 4, 1940, before a dedication on August 11, 1940. The ballpark originally had a covered wooden grandstand and a concrete foundation, with all seats having backs. The original ballfield was enclosed by a red brick wall along the streets down 3rd base line and left-to-center field that still exists today. Originally, the center field distance was 450 feet. Still in use today, the ballpark has been renovated with field turf and new grandstands. Jaycee Park is located at 12th Street & Highway 69 in Pittsburg, Kansas.

== Timeline ==
Year(s)	# Yrs.	Team	Level	League	Affiliate	Ballpark
1946–1951	6	Pittsburg Browns	Class D	Kansas-Oklahoma-Missouri League	St. Louis Browns	Jaycee Park

== Season-by-season records ==
Year	Record	Manager	Finish	Playoff/note
1946	61–59	Jimmie Crandall	4th	Lost in 1st round
1947	69–54	Jimmie Crandall	2nd	Lost in 1st round
1948	60–60	Shan Deniston / Don Smith	4th	Lost in Finals
1949	39–85	Albert Barkus / Olan Smith	8th	Did not qualify
1950	71–52	Olan Smith / Jimmie Crandall	4th	Lost in 1st round
1951	41–80	Olan Smith / Jimmie Crandall	5th	Did not qualify

== Notable alumni ==
- Jim Crandall (1946-1947, 1950-1951, MGR)
- Shan Deniston (1948, MGR)
- Don Lenhardt (1946)
- Chuck Locke (1950)
- Jim Pisoni (1950)

== See also ==
- Pittsburg Browns players
