= Bartlesville Pirates =

Minor league baseball team

- 1946–1952; Bartlesville, Oklahoma

Minor league affiliations
- Previous classes: Class D
- Previous leagues: Kansas-Oklahoma-Missouri League

Major league affiliations
- Previous teams: Pittsburgh Pirates

Team data
- Previous names: Pittsburg Pirates (July 7, 1952 - 1952); Bartlesville Pirates (1948 – July 7, 1952); Bartlesville Oilers (1946 – 1947)
- Previous parks: Doenges Stadium

The Bartlesville Pirates (known as the Bartlesville Oilers in 1946 and 1947) were a minor league baseball team. They played in Bartlesville, Oklahoma from 1946 to 1952. During that time, the club was a member of the Kansas-Oklahoma-Missouri League and a class-D affiliate of the Pittsburgh Pirates.

The team generally performed well, with their only losing seasons coming in their first and last seasons of existence. They did not have similar success in the league playoffs, losing in the first round four times, and in the league finals once.

Despite playing in Class D, the lowest level of minor league baseball, a few of the Pirates' players reached the major leagues either before or after playing in Bartlesville, including Hersh Martin, Brandy Davis, and Ron Kline.

On July 7, 1952, the team relocated to Pittsburg, Kansas to finish the season. After that 1952 season, the team and the league folded. As of 2025, they are the most recent professional baseball team to play in Bartlesville.

== Season-by-season ==
Year	Record	Finish	Manager	Playoffs
1948	71-52	3rd	Edward Marleau	Lost in 1st round (vs. Independence Yankees, 3 games to 2)
1949	71-55	2nd	Tedd Gullic	Lost in 1st round (vs. Iola Indians, 3 games to 1)
1950	73-48	2nd	Tedd Gullic	Lost League Finals (vs. Ponca City Dodgers, 3 games to 1); Won in 1st round (vs. Carthage Cubs, 3 games to 1)
1951	77-45	2nd	Tedd Gullic	Lost in 1st round (vs. Miami Eagles, 3 games to 1)
1952*	59-65	4th	Hersh Martin / Edward Hayes	

* Team moved to Pittsburg, Kansas on July 7, 1952
