= Independence Jewelers =

The Independence Jewelers were a minor league baseball team that played during the 1908 season. Based in Independence, Kansas, the team played in the Oklahoma–Kansas League. They were managed by Harry Truby. The team was the best-drawing squad in the league, with Sporting Life calling the city of Independence "baseball mad."

The most notable player on the 1908 Jewelers team was pitcher Gene Packard. While pitching for Independence against Tulsa, Oklahoma on July 26, Packard had a single hit shutout victory. On August 8 Packard pitched a game against Bartlesville, Oklahoma in which no Bartlesville player reached first base. The headlines in the local newspaper described the perfect game as a world's record.

== Timeline ==
Year(s)	# Yrs.	Team	Level	League	Affiliate
1896	1	Independence	Independent	Kansas State League	None
1906	1	Independence Coyotes	Class D	Kansas State League	None
1907	1	Independence Champs	Class D	Oklahoma-Arkansas-Kansas League	None
1908	1	Independence Jewelers	Class D	Oklahoma-Kansas League	None
1911	1	Independence Packers	Class D	Western Association	None
1921	1	Independence Producers	Class D	Southwestern League	None
1922–1923	2	Independence Producers	Class C	Southwestern League	None
1924	1	Independence Producers	Class D	Southwestern League	None
1925, 1928–1932	6	Independence Producers	Class C	Western Association	None
1947–1950	4	Independence Yankees	Class D	Kansas-Oklahoma-Missouri League	New York Yankees
1952	1	Independence Browns	Class D	Kansas-Oklahoma-Missouri League	St. Louis Browns
