= Pittsburg Pirates (minor league) =

Minor league baseball team from Kansas

- (1909, 1921, 1952); Pittsburg, Kansas

Minor league affiliations
- Previous classes: Class D (1921); Class C (1909)
- Previous leagues: Kansas-Oklahoma-Missouri League (1952); Southwestern League (1921); Western Association (1909)

Major league affiliations
- Previous teams: Pittsburgh Pirates (1952)

Minor league titles
- League titles: None

The Pittsburg Pirates was the name of three short-lived historic minor league baseball teams, based in Pittsburg, Kansas.

The first Pirates' team played in 1909 as a member of the class-C Western Association. They played for a single season, compiling a 52-73 record, and finishing seventh of the eight teams in the league.

An unrelated second Pittsburg Pirates team played in the class-D Southwestern League for the 1921 season. They played for a single season, compiling a 87-63 record, and finishing third in the eight-team league.

The third and final Pirates team existed for a half-season. From 1946 through 1951, the Pittsburg Browns played in the Kansas-Oklahoma-Missouri League. Before the 1952 season, the Browns moved to Independence, Kansas, leaving Pittsburg without a team. On July 7, 1952, in the middle of the season, the Bartlesville Pirates, a minor league affiliate of the Pittsburgh (PA) Pirates in the Kansas-Oklahoma-Missouri League, relocated from Bartlesville, Oklahoma to Pittsburg. They played the remainder of their season as the Pittsburg Pirates, finishing with a 59-65 record, and losing a one-game playoff to the Miami Eagles. The team, along with the rest of the league, folded after the 1952 season.

== Season-by-season ==
Year	Record	Finish	League	Manager	Playoffs
1909	52-73	7th	Western Association	Elmer Meredith	No playoffs
1921	87-63	3rd	Southwestern League	Frank Matthews	No playoffs
1952	59-65 (Note: Record includes games played as the Bartlesville Pirates before the team's July 7 relocation to Pittsburg.)	4th	KOM League	--	Lost 1-0 to Miami
