= Kansas-Oklahoma-Missouri League =

Minor league baseball league (1946-1952)

Kansas–Oklahoma–Missouri League
- Most recent season or competition: 1952 Kansas-Oklahoma-Missouri League season
- Classification: Class D (1946–1952)
- Sport: Baseball
- First season: 1946
- Folded: 1952
- President: E. L. Dale (1946–1952)
- No. of teams: 9
- Country: United States of America
- Most titles: 3 : Ponca City Dodgers (1948, 1950, 1951)
- Related competitions: Western Association

The Kansas–Oklahoma–Missouri League (or KOM League) was a name of an American minor league baseball league which was established in 1946 and played through 1952. As the name indicates, the Class D level league had franchises based in Kansas, Missouri and Oklahoma. Baseball Hall of Fame members Mickey Mantle played in the league for the 1949 Independence Yankees and Burleigh Grimes managed the 1948 Independence Yankees.

== History ==
The Kansas–Oklahoma–Missouri League was founded after World War II and ran from 1946 through 1952 as a Class D level league. Like many post-war minor leagues, it did not last a complete decade of play. During the seven year run of the league there were nine cities that represented the league. Four were from Kansas, four from Oklahoma and one from Missouri.

E.L. Dale served as the League president for its entire seven years of operation. The Ponca City Dodgers won three of the seven league titles, winning championships in 1948, 1950 and 1951. No other team won more than one championship. The total attendance of the KOM league, in the seven year period, reached slightly over two million fans. In 1948 the league had its best year, drawing 387,980, before the league permanently folded after the 1952 season. The Kansas–Oklahoma–Missouri League League had 1,588 total players, 30 made it to the majors and one made it to the Hall of Fame. In his first professional season, Mickey Mantle played for the 1949 Independence Yankees, hitting .313 with 7 HR, 63 RBI. Just graduated from high school in Oklahoma, Mantle received a $1,100 signing bonus from the New York Yankees and a salary of $400 for the rest of the season.

== Cities represented ==
- Bartlesville, OK:
  - Bartlesville Oilers (1946–1947)
  - Bartlesville Pirates (1948–1952)
- Blackwell, OK:
  - Blackwell Broncos (1952)
- Carthage, MO:
  - Carthage Cardinals (1946–1948)
  - Carthage Cubs (1949–1951)
- Chanute, KS:
  - Chanute Owls (1946)
  - Chanute Athletics (1947, 1949–1950)
  - Chanute Giants (1948)
- Independence, KS:
  - Independence Yankees (1947–1950)
  - Independence Browns 1952
- Iola, KS:
  - Iola Cubs (1946-1947)
  - Iola Indians (1948–1952)
- Miami, OK:
  - Miami Blues (1946)
  - Miami Owls (1947-1949)
  - Miami Eagles (1950–1952)
- Pittsburg, KS:
  - Pittsburg Browns (1946–1951)
  - Pittsburg Pirates (1952)
- Ponca City, OK:
  - Ponca City Dodgers (1947–1952)

== Standings & statistics ==
=== 1946 to 1947 ===
1946 Kansas-Oklahoma-Missouri League - schedule
The League and all of its member teams were created. Teams were formed in Bartlesville, Oklahoma, Carthage, Missouri, Chanute, Kansas, Iola, Kansas, Miami, Oklahoma, and Pittsburg, Kansas.

Team standings	Affiliate	W	L	PCT	GB	Attend	Managers
Chanute Owls	Topeka Owls	68	53	.562	-	41,600	Goldie Howard
Miami Blues	Brooklyn Dodgers	69	54	.561	-	49,266	Ted Vernon / Guy Froman
Iola Cubs	Chicago Cubs	63	57	.525	4½	45,231	Al Reitz
Pittsburg Browns	St. Louis Browns	61	59	.508	6½	42,932	Jimmie Crandall
Carthage Cardinals	St. Louis Cardinals	54	66	.450	13½	47,400	Buzz Arlitt
Bartlesville Oilers	Pittsburgh Pirates	47	73	.392	20½	46,822	Keith Willoughby

Playoffs: Iola 3 games, Miami 2; Chanute 3 games, Pittsburg 2.
Finals: Iola 3 games, Chanute 3. Rest of playoffs called off due to rain and lack of available playing grounds.

Player statistics
Player	Team	Stat	Tot	Player	Team	Stat	Tot
Newt Keithley	Miami	BA	.346	Ross Grimsley	Chanute	W	18
Richard Bulkley	Chanute	Runs	111	Oscar Walterman	Carthage	W	18
Newt Keithley	Miami	Hits	167	Ross Grimsley	Chanute	SO	295
Buzz Arlitt	Carthage	RBI	82	Ross Grimsley	Chanute	ERA	1.93
Larry Singleton	Iola	HR	10	Ross Grimsley	Chanute	PCT	.783 18-5

- Brooklyn assigned a few players to Miami that season but the team was actually run by Ted Vernon of Amarillo, Texas. When it was discovered that the Miami Baseball Club Inc. had turned the reigns of the operation of the club to Mr. Vernon, W. G. Bramham, the President of the National Association of Professional Baseball Leagues, sent a very stern letter to the Miami baseball officials that the rules had been violated in this matter. The next year the Dodgers moved their franchise to Ponca City, Oklahoma and Mr. Vernon returned to Amarillo.

Chanute beat Pittsburg by 3 games to 2 in the first round of the playoffs. Iola beat Miami by the same number. The championship series between Chanute and Iola ended tied at three games apiece, although Chanute won 4 games. A dispute arose between the Chanute and Iola club officials regarding Chanute selecting Dave Dennis from the Miami club for the playoffs. Although Iola owner Earl Sifers originally agreed to the arrangement he later changed his mind. By the time the dispute was settled it was too late in the fall, young men had to go back to school, the rodeo took over the ball park playing area and then the rains came.

1947 Kansas-Oklahoma-Missouri League
Teams from Independence, Kansas and Ponca City, Oklahoma joined.

Team standings	Affiliate	W	L	PCT	GB	Attend	Managers
Miami Owls	Topeka Owls	76	49	.608	-	53,119	William Davis
Iola Cubs	Chicago Cubs	69	54	.561	6	39,862	Al Reitz
Pittsburg Browns	St. Louis Browns	69	54	.561	6	59,435	Jimmie Crandall
Bartlesville Oilers	Pittsburgh Pirates	68	56	.548	7½	64,074	Edward Marleau
Carthage Cardinals	St. Louis Cardinals	66	59	.528	10	42,838	Woody Fair / Alvin Kluttz
Ponca City Dodgers	Brooklyn Dodgers	61	62	.496	14	55,554	Boyd Bartley
Chanute Athletics	None	44	80	.355	31½	34,758	Dave Dennis / Charles Bates
Independence Yankees	New York Yankees	41	80	.339	33	22,460	Goldie Howard

Playoffs: Miami 3 games, Bartlesville 1; Iola 3 games, Pittsburg 1.
Finals: Miami 4 games, Iola 1.

Player statistics
Player	Team	Stat	Tot	Player	Team	Stat	Tot
Loren Packard	Miami	BA	.364	Carroll Dial	Bartlesville	W	22
Albert Solenberger	Bartlesville	Runs	131	James Morris	Miami	SO	240
Loren Packard	Miami	Hits	185	Carroll Dial	Bartlesville	ERA	3.32
Loren Packard	Miami	RBI	124	Jim Post	Pittsburg	PCT	.813 13-3
Jim Baxes	Ponca City	HR	20				

=== 1948 to 1949 ===
1948 Kansas-Oklahoma-Missouri League

Team standings	Affiliate	W	L	PCT	GB	Attend	Managers
Ponca City Dodgers	Brooklyn Dodgers	79	47	.627	-	78,305	Boyd Bartley
Independence Yankees	New York Yankees	74	46	.617	2	46,270	Goldie Howard / Burleigh Grimes / Bones Sanders
Bartlesville Pirates	Pittsburgh Pirates	71	52	.577	6½	64,090	Edward Marleau
Pittsburg Browns	St. Louis Browns	60	60	.500	16	53,743	Shan Deniston / Donald Smith
Miami Owls	Topeka Owls	58	66	.468	20	33,716	Arthur Priebe / James Hansen
Carthage Cardinals	St. Louis Cardinals	51	67	.432	24	36,525	Alvin Kluttz
Iola Indians	Cleveland Indians	51	72	.415	26½	42,770	Al Reitz
Chanute Giants	New York Giants	44	78	.361	33	32,561	Al Smith

Playoffs: Pittsburg 3 games, Ponca City 2; Independence 3 games, Bartlesville 2.
Finals: Independence 4 games, Pittsburg 1.

Player statistics
Player	Team	Stat	Tot	Player	Team	Stat	Tot
William Fox	Chanute	BA	.327	Harland Coffman	Independence	W	18
Louis Godla	Bartlesville	Runs	83	Lou Michels	Independence	W	18
Al Solenberger	Bartlesville	Hits	134	Joseph Tufteland	Ponca City	W	18
Charles Sturnborg	Pittsburg	RBI	78	Bill Pierro	Bartlesville	SO	300
Charles Sturnborg	Pittsburg	HR	13	Harland Coffman	Independence	ERA	1.94
Joseph Beran	Ponca City	HR	13	Joseph Tufteland	Ponca City	PCT	.900 18-2

1949 Kansas-Oklahoma-Missouri League
schedule

Team standings	Affiliate	W	L	PCT	GB	Attend	Managers
Independence Yankees	New York Yankees	71	53	.573	-	46,607	Harry Craft
Bartlesville Pirates	Pittsburgh Pirates	71	55	.563	1	51,000	Tedd Gullic
Iola Indians	Cleveland Indians	70	55	.560	1½	49,491	Windy Johnson
Ponca City Dodgers	Brooklyn Dodgers	66	59	.528	5½	62,082	Boyd Bartley
Chanute Athletics	None	65	60	.520	6½	39,228	James Hansen / Charles Bates
Carthage Cubs	Chicago Cubs	62	64	.492	10	38,028	Don Anderson
Miami Owls	Topeka Owls	56	69	.448	15½	32,887	Omar Lane
Pittsburg Browns	St. Louis Browns	39	85	.315	32	39,755	Al Barkus / Olan Smith

Playoffs: Independence 3 games, Ponca City 1; Iola 3 games, Bartlesville 1.
Finals: Independence 3 games, Iola 0.

Player statistics
Player	Team	Stat	Tot	Player	Team	Stat	Tot
Richard Drury	Bartlesville	BA	.317	Jake Thies	Chanute	W	18
Charles Weber	Independence	Runs	98	Bob Weisler	Independence	SO	240
James Bello	Independence	Hits	156	Conrad Swensson	Ponca City	ERA	1.69
Harry Bright	Miami	RBI	96	Conrad Swensson	Ponca City	PCT	.800 12-3
Bob Speake	Carthage	HR	14				

=== 1950 to 1952 ===
1950 Kansas-Oklahoma-Missouri League

Team standings	Affiliate	W	L	PCT	GB	Attend	Managers
Ponca City Dodgers	Brooklyn Dodgers	80	42	.656	-	63,313	Boyd Bartley
Bartlesville Pirates	Pittsburgh Pirates	73	48	.603	6½	56,250	Tedd Gullic
Carthage Cubs	Chicago Cubs	75	50	.600	6½	29,080	Don Anderson
Pittsburg Browns	St. Louis Browns	71	52	.577	9½	43,953	Olan Smith / Jimmie Crandall
Miami Eagles	None	62	60	.508	18	27,548	Jack Hodge / Jim Oglesby / Pug Griffin
Independence Yankees	New York Yankees	60	66	.476	22	38,274	Bunny Mick / Bones Sanders
Iola Indians	None	35	84	.294	43½	23,872	Windy Johnson
Chanute Athletics	None	35	89	.282	46	21,372	Charles Bates / Thomas Imfeld / Chuck Hostetler

Playoffs: Ponca City 3 games, Pittsburg 2; Bartlesville 3 games, Carthage 1.
Finals: Ponca City 3 games, Bartlesville 1.

Player statistics
Player	Team	Stat	Tot	Player	Team	Stat	Tot
Stan Gwinn	Ponca City	BA	.320	Tom Vines	Carthage	W	17
Jim Pisoni	Pittsburg	Runs	115	Donald McKeon	Miami	W	17
Don Hunter	Ponca City	Hits	152	Tom Vines	Carthage	SO	234
Loren Doll	Ponca City	Hits	152	David Elliot	Bartlesville	ERA	2.04
Harold Neighbors	Bartlesville	RBI	107	Joe Stanek	Ponca City	PCT	.846 11-2
Willard Davis	Ponca City	HR	21				

1951 Kansas-Oklahoma-Missouri League
The teams in Chanute and Independence folded.

Team standings	Affiliate	W	L	PCT	GB	Attend	Managers
Ponca City Dodgers	Brooklyn Dodgers	85	39	.686	-	44,960	George Scherger
Bartlesville Pirates	Pittsburgh Pirates	77	45	.631	7	34,296	Tedd Gullic
Miami Eagles	None	67	55	.549	17	23,500	Pug Griffin / Tom Warren
Carthage Cubs	Chicago Cubs	60	65	.480	25½	20,022	Don Anderson / Al Reitz
Pittsburg Browns	St. Louis Browns	41	80	.339	42½	22,534	Bill Enos
Iola Indians	None	38	84	.311	46	16,981	Forrest L. Crawford / Al Reitz/ Mason Pool / Floyd Temple

Playoffs: Carthage 3 games, Ponca City 2; Miami 3 games, Bartletsville 1.
Finals: Carthage 3 games, Miami 0.

Player statistics
Player	Team	Stat	Tot	Player	Team	Stat	Tot
Jack Denison	Ponca City	BA	.365	Ron Kline	Bartlesville	W	18
Jack Denison	Ponca City	Runs	133	Donald Cochran	Bartlesville	W	18
Jack Denison	Ponca City	Hits	167	Ron Kline	Barletsville	SO	208
Robert Ottesen	Pittsburg	RBI	89	John Mudd	Carthage	ERA	2.12
Brandy Davis	Bartlesville	HR	13	Ron Kline	Bartlesville	PCT	.818 18-4
Bill Phillips	Bartlesville	HR	13				

1952 Kansas-Oklahoma-Missouri League
The Carthage Cubs moved to Blackwell, Oklahoma. The Pittsburg Brownies moved to Independence, Kansas. The Bartlesville Pirates moved to the now-vacant Pittsburg on July 7.

Team standings	Affiliate	W	L	PCT	GB	Attend	Managers
Iola Indians	None	79	47	.627	-	42,327	Floyd Temple / Woody Fair
Miami Eagles	Philadelphia Phillies	67	57	.540	11	43,008	John Davenport
Ponca City Dodgers	Brooklyn Dodgers	68	58	.540	11	55,726	Boyd Bartley
Bartlesville Pirates / Pittsburg Pirates	Pittsburgh Pirates	59	65	.476	19	34,267	Hersh Martin / Ed Hayes
Blackwell Broncos	Chicago Cubs	57	69	.452	22	51,000	Al Reitz
Independence Browns	St. Louis Browns	46	80	.365	33	39,487	Fred Collins

Bartlesville moved to Pittsburg July 7.
Playoffs: Ponca City 1 game, Iola 0; Miami 1 game, Pittsburg 0;
Finals: Miami 2 games, Ponca City 0.

Player statistics
Player	Team	Stat	Tot	Player	Team	Stat	Tot
John Vossen	Miami	BA	.335	Joe Vilk	Iola	W	26
Paul Weeks	Iola	Runs	128	[Jim Owens	Miami	S0	300
Gaspar del Toro	Iola	Hits	155	Jim Owens	Miami	ERA	1.76
John Davenport	Miami	RBI	116	Joe Vilk	Iola	PCT	.813 26-6
Don Ervin	Miami	HR	24				
