= Coffeyville Glassblowers =

Minor league baseball team

The Coffeyville Glassblowers were a Class-D minor league baseball team based in Coffeyville, Kansas, that played in the Oklahoma–Arkansas–Kansas League in 1907. The team featured Billy Kelsey and Frank Moore, who both had Major League Baseball experience. They were managed by Bill Stuart.
