= Danny Friend =

American baseball player (1873–1942)

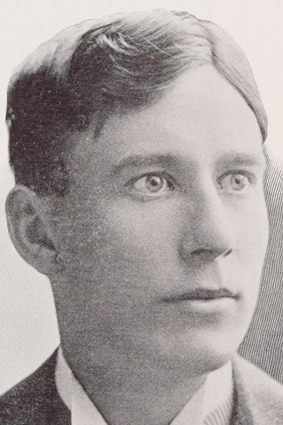
- Pitcher
- Born: April 18, 1873; Cincinnati, Ohio, U.S.
- Died: June 1, 1942 (aged 69); Chillicothe, Ohio, U.S.
- Batted: Left Threw: Left

MLB debut
- September 10, 1895, for the Chicago Colts

Last MLB appearance
- May 8, 1898, for the Chicago Colts

MLB statistics
- Win–loss record: 32–39
- Earned run average: 4.71
- Strikeouts: 158
- Stats at Baseball Reference

Teams
- Chicago Colts (1895–1898)

Daniel Sebastian Friend (April 18, 1873 – June 1, 1942) was an American Major League Baseball pitcher who pitched for the Chicago Colts (later renamed the Chicago Cubs) of the National League from 1895 through 1898.

== Career ==
Friend was born on April 18, 1873, in Cincinnati. He made his Major League debut with the Chicago Colts on September 10, 1895, against the New York Giants. The Colts won his debut by a score of 13–2. He pitched in five games for the Colts in 1895, starting all five. He pitched 41 innings and had a won-loss record of 2–2, with an earned run average of 5.27. His earned run average was slightly worse than league average.

Friend was the Colts' Opening Day starting pitcher in 1896. Friend had his best season in 1896. He pitched in 36 games, starting 33. He had 290 2/3 innings pitched, an 18–14 won–lost record, and an earned run average of 4.74, again slightly worse than league average. In 1897, Friend had another big season in which he pitched in 24 games, starting all 24. He pitched 203 innings with a 12–11 won–lost record, and an earned run average of 4.52, again slightly worse than league average.

Friend's final Major League season was in 1898. He pitched in only two games for the Colts, losing both with an earned run average of 5.29. However, he did have a minor league career that extended until 1908. In the minors, he pitched for the Providence Grays in 1901 and 1902, the Peoria Distillers in 1903, the New Bedford Whalers from 1904 through 1906, and the Independence Champs in 1907. In 1908, he pitched for three minor league teams: the Columbia Gamecocks, the Norfolk Tars and the Lynchburg Shoemakers.

For his Major League career, Friend pitched in 67 games and 551 2/3 innings, with an earned run average of 4.71 and a won–lost record of 32–29. As a hitter, he had a career batting average of .256, a career slugging percentage of .283 and a career on-base percentage of .332 in 238 at bats. Friend died on June 1, 1942, in Chillicothe, Ohio.
