= Woody Fair =

American baseball player (1914–2000)

Woodrow Clark Fair (April 11, 1914 – November 14, 2000) was a minor league baseball outfielder who played for 17 seasons - from 1934 to 1943 and from 1946 to 1952. He was considered the best player in the Carolina League during its early years.

He was born in Turner, Washington. Over the course of his career, Fair hit .306 with 275 home runs, 438 doubles and 105 triples in 1,892 games. His best years came as a member of the Carolina League, where he spent six seasons - from 1946 to 1951. In that span he hit .324 with 123 home runs and 559 RBI. He hit as many as 38 home runs in a season.

He also managed for a few seasons. In 1942, he led the New Iberia Cardinals until they disbanded on May 22. In 1947, he managed the Carthage Cardinals and in 1948 he led the Danville Leafs after replacing Bob Latshaw. He led the Leafs again in 1949. He managed the Iola Indians in 1952 after replacing Floyd Temple.
