= Shulthis Stadium Grandstand =

Baseball grandstand in Kansas, US

Coordinates: 37.2395°N 95.7036°W

The Shulthis Stadium Grandstand was a baseball grandstand located in Independence, Kansas.

== History ==
It was built in 1918 by Albert W. Shulthis, and donated to the city of Independence. Shulthis was the president of many local businesses, which included the Western States Portland Cement Company, the Citizens National Bank, and the Southwestern Oil, Gas, and Coal Company. The concrete grandstand he built was a first for baseball in Kansas, and the grandstand's addition to the field created the most significant baseball stadium in the state at the time. The stadium was home to some minor league baseball teams for many years. The teams included the Independence Producers, the Independence Yankees, and the Independence Browns. The stadium was also the site for the first night game in the history of Organized Baseball, which was played on April 28, 1930. The primary building materials for the grandstand were concrete and red brick. The seating capacity listed in 1923 was 2,500 people. In addition to the grandstand bleachers, the grandstand also had box seating. The enclosed space under the bleachers contained a rub and bath room, a player's club room, a ground keeper's room, a lavatory for gentleman, and a lavatory for ladies. A Spalding representative viewed the grandstand in 1921, and commented that it was one of the finest grandstands he had ever visited. The Sioux City Packers used the stadium for their spring training, and Major League Baseball teams like the Chicago White Sox played there.

Shulthis Stadium was home field for many notable players. Mickey Mantle, Bill Virdon, Cy Blanton, Ralph Terry, and Glenn Wright all played for Independence. Mantle's first professional home run was at Shulthis Stadium, and it cleared the center field wall. The distance from home plate to the center field wall was 460 feet, and there is a myth that the ball landed 600 feet away on Monkey Island. Burleigh Grimes, the famous spitball pitcher, was a manager for the Independence Yankees. The Independence Yankees were a Class D minor league team affiliated with the New York Yankees. One of the most famous visiting players was Satchel Paige, who pitched for the Harlem Globetrotters at the stadium in 1954. Other visiting teams included the House of David, Kansas City Monarchs, and the Memphis Red Sox.

The Kansas Preservation Alliance had listed the grandstand on their endangered places in 2014. On August 8, 2015, the Kansas Historic Sites Review Board was going to consider listing the grandstand on the National Register of Historic Places. Demolition on the grandstand started on July 28, just days before the board meeting took place.
