= Muddy Ruel =

American baseball player, manager, and executive (1896–1963)

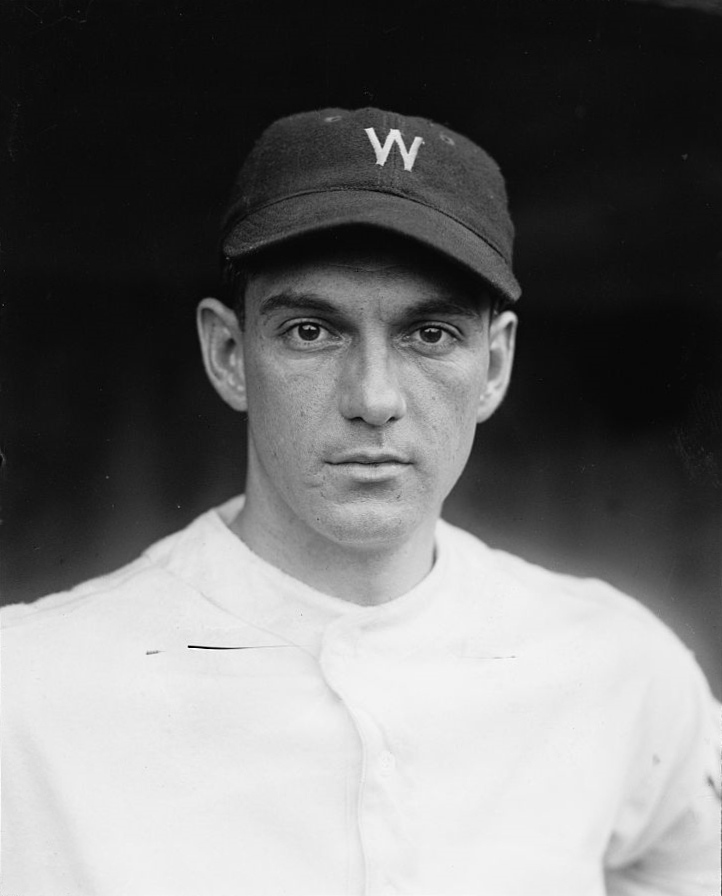
- Catcher / Manager / Coach / General manager
- Born: February 20, 1896; St. Louis, Missouri, U.S.
- Died: November 13, 1963 (aged 67); Palo Alto, California, U.S.
- Batted: Right Threw: Right

MLB debut
- May 29, 1915, for the St. Louis Browns

Last MLB appearance
- August 25, 1934, for the Chicago White Sox

MLB statistics
- Batting average: .275
- Home runs: 4
- Runs batted in: 534
- Managerial record: 59–95
- Winning %: .383
- Stats at Baseball Reference

Teams
- As player: St. Louis Browns (1915); New York Yankees (1917–1920); Boston Red Sox (1921–1922); Washington Senators (1923–1930); Boston Red Sox (1931); Detroit Tigers (1931–1932); St. Louis Browns (1933); Chicago White Sox (1934); As manager: St. Louis Browns (1947); As coach: Chicago White Sox (1935–1945); Cleveland Indians (1948–1950); As general manager: Detroit Tigers (1954–1956)

Career highlights and awards
- 2× World Series champion (1924, 1948)

Herold Dominic "Muddy" Ruel (February 20, 1896 – November 13, 1963) was an American professional baseball player, coach, manager and general manager. He played as a catcher in Major League Baseball from 1915 to 1934 for the Washington Senators, St. Louis Browns, New York Yankees, Boston Red Sox, Detroit Tigers, and Chicago White Sox.

One of the top defensive catchers of his era, Ruel was notable for being the personal catcher for Baseball Hall of Fame pitcher Walter Johnson and for scoring the winning run for the Washington Senators in Game 7 of the 1924 World Series.

== Major League career ==
Ruel was born in St. Louis, Missouri. He began his professional baseball career at the age of 19 with his hometown team, the St. Louis Browns, appearing in 10 games during the 1915 season. He then played in the minor leagues for two seasons with the Memphis Chickasaws before joining the New York Yankees in 1918. With the Yankees, Ruel shared catching duties with Truck Hannah from 1918 to 1920. He was the Yankees catcher on 16 August 1920 when a Carl Mays' pitch hit Ray Chapman on the head, resulting in Chapman's death the next day. He later defended Mays and said that he was innocent of any wrongdoing.

Ruel was traded to the Boston Red Sox in 1921, where he played for two seasons before being traded to the Washington Senators in 1923. In the 1923 season, he posted a career-high batting average of .316 along with 54 runs batted in. He led American League catchers in assists and putouts, and finished 11th in the American League Most Valuable Player Award ballot. He had another solid year in 1924, playing in 149 games and once again leading the American League catchers in assists and putouts. With Ruel calling the pitches, Walter Johnson's career was revitalized, as he led the league with 23 victories and a 2.72 earned run average. The Senators clinched the 1924 American League pennant, finishing the season two games ahead of the New York Yankees.

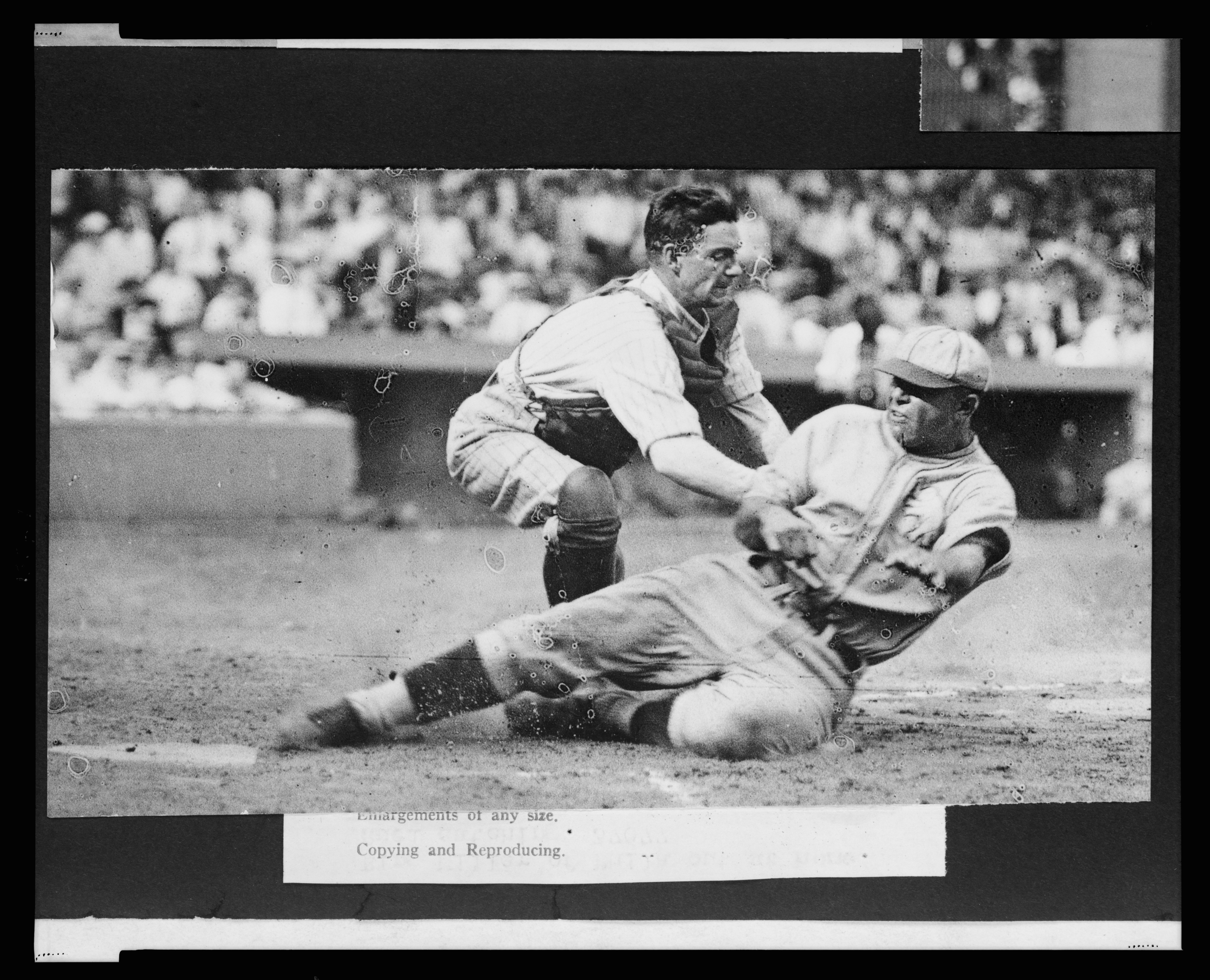
Muddy Ruel tags out Bing Miller of the Philadelphia Athletics during a 1925 game.

The Senators faced John McGraw's heavily favored New York Giants in the 1924 World Series. The two teams traded wins back and forth until the series reached the seventh and deciding game. The Senators trailed the Giants 3–1 in the eighth inning of Game 7, when they rallied and tied the score. Ruel hit a single, then scored the tying run during the rally, to send the game into extra innings with the score tied at three runs apiece. In the bottom of the twelfth inning, Ruel hit a high foul ball directly over home plate. Giants catcher Hank Gowdy dropped his protective mask to field the ball, but failing to toss the mask aside, stumbled over it and dropped the ball, thus giving Ruel another chance to bat. On the next pitch, Ruel hit a double, and scored the winning run when Earl McNeely hit a ground ball that took a bad hop over third baseman Freddie Lindstrom's head.

Ruel had another good season in 1925, producing a .310 batting average along with 54 runs batted in and, for the third consecutive year, he led American League catchers in assists and putouts. The Senators won the American League pennant for the second year in a row, but were defeated by the Pittsburgh Pirates in the 1925 World Series. Ruel hit for a .299 batting average in 1926 and led the American League catchers with a .989 fielding percentage, as the Senators slipped to a fourth-place finish. He had one more good season in 1927, posting a .310 batting average and finishing second among catchers in fielding percentage, putouts, assists, and baserunners caught stealing. Ruel finished sixth in the 1927 American League Most Valuable Player Award balloting.

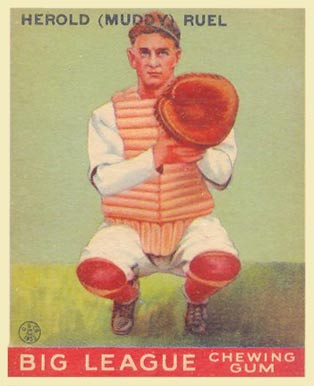
1933 Goudey baseball card of Muddy Ruel

After the 1927 season, his offensive production began to diminish, and by 1929, Bennie Tate had begun to take over as the Senators' main catcher. In December 1930, Ruel's contract was purchased from the Senators by the Boston Red Sox, who then traded him to the Detroit Tigers in August 1931. With the Tigers, he served as a reserve catcher in 1932 working behind Ray Hayworth. He returned to the St. Louis Browns in 1933 before ending his playing career with the Chicago White Sox in 1934 at the age of 38.

== Career statistics ==
In a nineteen-year major league career, Ruel played in 1,468 games, accumulating 1,242 hits in 4,514 at bats for a .275 career batting average along with 4 home runs, 534 runs batted in and a .365 on-base percentage. He possessed strong defensive skills, leading American League catchers in fielding percentage three consecutive years (1926–28), and finishing with a .982 career fielding percentage. Ruel also led American League catchers three times in putouts and assists, and twice in range factor and in baserunners caught stealing. He made 23 double plays in 1924, the seventh highest season total for catchers in major league history.

His reputation as a defensive stand out is enhanced because of the era in which he played. In the Deadball Era, catchers played a huge defensive role, given the large number of bunts and stolen base attempts, as well as the difficulty of handling the spitball pitchers who dominated pitching staffs. Richard Kendall of the Society for American Baseball Research devised a study that ranked Ruel as the fifth most dominating fielding catcher in major league history.

== Post-playing career ==
After retiring as a player, Ruel spent a decade as a coach with the Chicago White Sox from 1935 to 1945. He then became an assistant to Commissioner of Baseball Happy Chandler in 1946. He worked with Chandler for only one year before accepting his only managerial job with the St. Louis Browns, where he led the 1947 team to a dismal 59–95 record, good for the American League cellar. Ruel then coached for the Cleveland Indians from 1948 to 1950, winning another world championship as a coach with the Indians in the 1948 World Series. He was later named as the director of the Detroit Tigers' farm system before taking on the role as the Tigers' general manager from 1954 to 1956.

Ruel was one of the few major leaguers to hold a law degree. He earned his degree from Washington University in St. Louis and was admitted to practice before the US Supreme Court. Ruel is credited for being the first to label the catcher's protective equipment as the "tools of ignorance". This was a self-deprecating reference to the harsh physical demands of the catcher's position due to exposure to errant pitches, foul tips, and collisions at home plate.

Ruel suffered a heart attack in his car two blocks from his home in Palo Alto, California on November 13, 1963. An ambulance took him to Stanford–Palo Alto Hospital, where he was pronounced dead upon arrival, age 67. He was buried at Alta Mesa Memorial Park in Palo Alto.

== Managerial record ==
Team	Year	Regular season					Postseason			
Team	Year	Games	Won	Lost	Win %	Finish	Won	Lost	Win %	Result
SLB	1947	154	59	95	.383	8th in AL	–	–	–	–
Total		154	59	95	.383		0	0	–	

Sporting positions
Preceded by Charlie Gehringer	Detroit Tigers general manager 1954–1956	Succeeded by Walter Briggs, Jr.
