= Blackwell Broncos =

- 1924–1954; (1924–1926, 1952, 1954); Blackwell, Oklahoma

Minor league affiliations
- Class: Class D (1924–1926, 1952); Class C (1954)
- League: Oklahoma State League (1924); Southwestern League (1924–1926); Kansas-Oklahoma-Missouri League (1952); Western Association (1954)

Major league affiliations
- Team: Chicago Cubs (1952, 1954)

Minor league titles
- League titles (1): 1954
- Conference titles (1): 1924
- Wild card berths (1): 1954

Team data
- Name: Blackwell Gassers (1924–1926); Blackwell Broncos (1952, 1954)
- Ballpark: Fairgrounds Park (1924–1926); Morgan Field (1952, 1954)

The Blackwell Broncos were a minor league baseball team based in Blackwell, Oklahoma. Preceded by the 1924 to 1926 Blackwell Gassers, Blackwell teams played in the Class D level as members of the 1924 Oklahoma State League, Southwestern League from 1924 to 1926, 1952 Kansas-Oklahoma-Missouri League and 1954 Western Association. The Blackwell Broncos won the 1954 Western Association championship and were a minor league affiliate of the Chicago Cubs in 1952 and 1954.

The Blackwell teams hosted home minor league games at Fairgrounds Park and Morgan Field, which were on the same site. Morgan Field is still in use today.

== History ==
Minor league baseball began in Blackwell, Oklahoma with two separate teams in the 1924 season.

First, the 1924 Blackwell Gassers began play as members of the Class D level Oklahoma State League, before the league folded during the season. On July 8, 1924, Blackwell had a record of 20–53 and were in seventh place when the Oklahoma State League permanently disbanded. Blackwell played under managers J. Rustenhaven and Hal Grun, finishing 32.0 games behind the first place Ardmore Bearcats. The Gassers' home field in Blackwell was Fairgrounds Park.

After the Oklahoma State League folded, Blackwell quickly gained a second team in 1924. On July 26, 1924, the Newton Railroaders of the Class D level Southwestern League briefly moved to Blackwell after a windstorm damaged their stadium in Newton. The team played 11 total games for Blackwell (7–4) before the team moved to Ottawa, Kansas on August 5, 1924. The team was 13–11 in Ottawa before being able to move back to Newton on August 28, 1916. On the field, Newton/Blackwell/Ottawa team finished with an overall record of 79–50 in the regular season, placing first overall in the Southwestern League to capture the league pennant. In the Southwestern League Finals, the Arkansas City Osages defeated Newton/Blackwell/Ottawa team 4 games to 3.

The Blackwell Gassers returned to play in the 1925 Southwestern League. In the six–team Class D level Southwestern League, Blackwell had a record of 61–66, placing fifth. The Gassers finished 11.5 games behind the first place Salina Millers in the Southwestern League final standings, playing under manager Ralph Heatley.

With Blackwell continuing play in 1926, the Southwestern League played their final season. The Blackwell Gassers ended the season with a 45–71 record placing sixth and last in the Southwestern League regular season standings. The Gassers finished 30.5 games behind the first place Salina Millers in the final standings. Blackwell was managed by Stormy Kromer and Mike Balenti. The Southwestern League permanently folded after the conclusion of the 1926 season.

Minor league returned to Blackwell when the franchise joined the 1952 Class D level Kansas-Oklahoma-Missouri League as an affiliate of the Chicago Cubs. Blackwell had regained a franchise when the Carthage Cubs franchise relocated to Blackwell. The Blackwell Broncos were also known as the Blackwell Cubs. With a regular season record of 57–69, Blackwell placed fifth in the six–team Kansas-Oklahoma-Missouri League, finishing 22.0 games behind the first place Iola Indians. The manager was Al Reitz. The team began play at Blackwell's Morgan Field, drawing a total season attendance of 51,000. The Kansas-Oklahoma-Missouri League permanently folded after the 1952 season.

In 1954, the Blackwell Broncos returned to minor league play and won the league championship in a new league. Blackwell became members of the Class C level Western Association as an affiliate of the Chicago Cubs. Blackwell finished the 1954 Western Association regular season with a record of 79–61, placing fourth, finishing 9.0 games behind the first place Topeka Owls. Managed by Joe Consoli and Al Kubski, Blackwell qualified for the playoffs behind a league leading 37 home runs and 144 RBI from player/manager Kubski. In the first round of the playoffs, Blackwell swept the Topeka Owls in three games. In the Western Association Finals, the Blackwell Broncos defeated the St. Joseph Saints 4 games to 1 to win the league championship. Season attendance at Morgan Field was 39,637. Blackwell was unable to defend their title, as the Western Association permanently folded after the 1954 season.

Blackwell, Oklahoma would not host another minor league team until 2023, when the Blackwell Flycatchers of the Pecos League began play at historic Morgan Field. The Flycatchers returned for the 2024 season as well.

== The ballparks ==
The Blackwell Gassers of 1924 to 1926 hosted minor league home games at Fairgrounds Park. Fairgrounds Park was located at South Main & East Lawrence Avenue in Blackwell Oklahoma.

The Blackwell Broncos hosted home games at Morgan Field in 1952 and 1954. The ballpark was on the same parcel as the former Fairgrounds Park and had a capacity of 2,500 (1952) and 3,500 (1954). Morgan Field was located at 900 South Main & Adams, Blackwell, Oklahoma. Today, the site is still in use as home of the Blackwell Flycatchers of the Pecos League.

== Timeline ==
Year(s)	# Yrs.	Team	Level	League	Affiliate	Ballpark
1924 (1)	1	Blackwell Gassers	Class D	Oklahoma State League	None	Fairgrounds Park
1924–1926	3	Blackwell Gassers	Class D	Southwestern League	None	Fairgrounds Park
1952	1	Blackwell Broncos	Class D	Kansas-Oklahoma-Missouri League	Chicago Cubs	Morgan Field
1954	1	Blackwell Broncos	Class D	Western Association	Chicago Cubs	Morgan Field

== Season–by–season ==
Year	Record	Manager	Finish	Playoffs/Notes
1924 (1)	20–53	J. Rustenhaven / Hal Grun	7th	League Disbanded July 8
1924 (2)	7–4	John McCloskey	1st	Temporary move from Newton
1925	61–66	Ralph Heatley	5th	No playoffs held
1926	45–71	J.G. Kromer / Mike Balenti	6th	No playoffs held
1952	57–69	Al Reitz	5th	Did not qualify
1954	79–61	Joe Consoli / Al Kubski	4th	League champions

== Notable alumni ==
- Mike Balenti (1926)
- Bill Lewis (1926)
- Andy Varga (1952)
- Blackwell Gassers players

== External references ==
- Blackwell - Baseball Reference
