= Ross Grimsley =

American baseball player (born 1950)

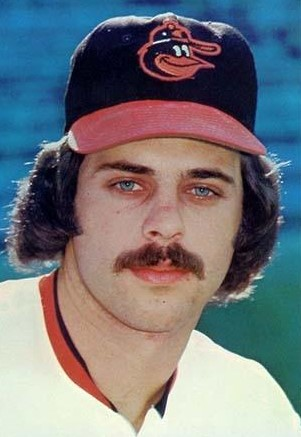
- Pitcher
- Born: January 7, 1950 (age 76); Topeka, Kansas, U.S.
- Batted: Left Threw: Left

MLB debut
- May 16, 1971, for the Cincinnati Reds

Last MLB appearance
- September 24, 1982, for the Baltimore Orioles

MLB statistics
- Win–loss record: 124–99
- Earned run average: 3.81
- Strikeouts: 750
- Stats at Baseball Reference

Teams
- Cincinnati Reds (1971–1973); Baltimore Orioles (1974–1977); Montreal Expos (1978–1980); Cleveland Indians (1980); Baltimore Orioles (1982)

Career highlights and awards
- All-Star (1978)

Ross Albert Grimsley Jr. (born January 7, 1950) is an American former left-handed pitcher in Major League Baseball who played for the Cincinnati Reds (1971–73), Baltimore Orioles (1974–77 and 1982), Montreal Expos (1978–80) and Cleveland Indians (1980). His father, Ross Sr., pitched for the 1951 Chicago White Sox.

== Early life ==
Grimsley was the son of Ross Sr., who pitched for the 1951 Chicago White Sox, and his wife Judy (Robinson) Grimsley. Ross Sr., a World War II veteran, had a long minor-league playing career.

The younger Grimsley was a 1969 graduate of Frayser High School in Memphis, Tennessee, where he was an outstanding basketball and baseball player. He attended Jackson State Community College in Jackson, Tennessee. He was drafted by the Cincinnati Reds in the first round (17th pick) of the 1969 amateur draft (January Secondary).

== Major league career ==
Grimsley made his major league debut for the Reds at age 21 on May 16, 1971 in a 9-3 loss to the Expos at Riverfront Stadium. He started and took the loss, pitched 1.2 innings and gave up three earned runs. The first major league hitter he faced was Ron Hunt. In 26 starts that year, Grimsley posted a record of 10-7 with a 3.57 ERA.

Grimsley followed up with an even better season in 1972, going 14-8 with a 3.05 ERA for the National League champion Reds. He also had a strong World Series, going 2-1 in four games (three in relief) with a 2.57 ERA as the Reds fell to the Oakland Athletics in seven games. In 1973, Grimsley was 13-10 with a 3.23 ERA as the Reds won the NL West division.

The Reds were well known for conservative appearance rules for its players. Flouting the team rules with long hair, he ran afoul of manager Sparky Anderson, who requested after the 1973 season that Grimsley be traded. He, along with Wally Williams, was sent to the Baltimore Orioles for Merv Rettenmund, Junior Kennedy and Bill Wood on December 4 of that year.

The deal paid off for the Orioles in 1974, as Grimsley went 18-13 with 17 complete games in a career-high 39 starts as the Orioles won the American League East division. In 1975 and 1976, his totals declined, with records of 10-13 with a 4.07 ERA and 8-7 with a 3.95 ERA. In 1977, Grimsley finished with a 14-10 mark and a 3.96 ERA.

Filing for free agency after four seasons with the Orioles, Grimsley signed a six-year, $1.1 million contract with the Montreal Expos on December 6, 1977. The Orioles had attempted to trade him to the Expos for Barry Foote prior to the 1977 season. Grimsley rewarded the Expos with his best year in 1978. He was named to the 1978 National League All-Star team and finished seventh in voting for the 1978 National League Cy Young Award, posting a record of 20-11, 19 complete games, three shutouts, 263 innings pitched and a 3.05 ERA. However, in 1979 Grimsley declined to a record of 10-9 with a 5.35 ERA. In 1980, he finished 2-6 with a 6.31 ERA for the Expos, and on July 11 was traded to the Cleveland Indians, for whom he went 4-5 with a 6.75 ERA.

Grimsley was released by the Indians and did not pitch in the majors in 1981. In 1982 he returned to the Orioles, pitching in 21 games in his final major league season. Grimsley's career totals included a 124-99 record, 79 complete games, 15 shutouts, 2,039 innings pitched and a 3.81 ERA.

Grimsley was one of the more colorful players of the 1970s. With the Reds, he was called into manager Sparky Anderson's office and told to stop corresponding with a "witch" who had been sending him good luck charms.

=== Manning v. Grimsley ===
In an incident on September 16, 1975 at Fenway Park, Grimsley, warming up in the Orioles' bullpen, responded to Boston fans' heckling by throwing into the right field bleachers. The ball passed through the protective netting, injuring a Boston fan. The fan named Manning later successfully sued Grimsley and the Orioles (under Respondeat superior) in Manning v. Grimsley, a case cited in law casebooks to highlight the scope of employment law as it relates to agency. He was accused by Yankees manager Billy Martin in 1977 of throwing spitball pitches using Vaseline hidden in his hair, which was usually somewhat greasy in appearance anyway due to Grimsley's penchant for not showering during winning streaks. In addition to his nickname "Scuz" for his grooming habits, Grimsley was also called "Crazy Eyes" for wearing turquoise contact lenses.

== Post-playing career ==
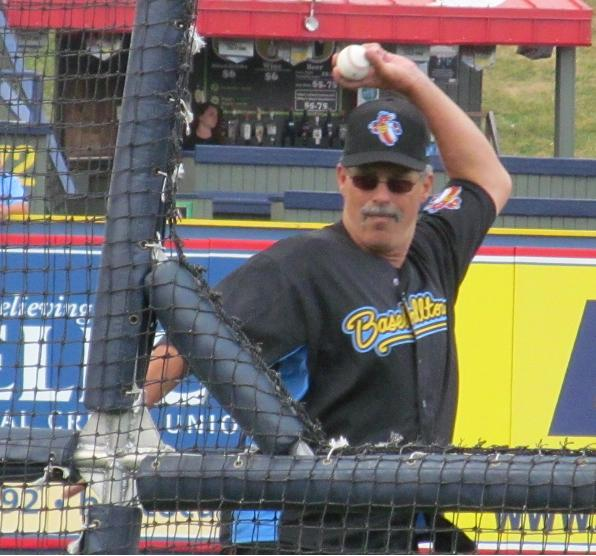
Grimsley pitching batting practice prior to the 2012 Eastern League All-Star Game

After his playing career ended, he was a minor league instructor for the Orioles, Atlanta Braves, Seattle Mariners and Philadelphia Phillies.

Grimsley also spent multiple years, starting in 1999, as a minor-league pitching coach for the San Francisco Giants, and for the AA Richmond Flying Squirrels.

He has also co-hosted pre-game Orioles coverage on Baltimore's WJZ-FM 105.7, the team's flagship radio station.

He and his wife live outside of Baltimore.

== See also ==
- List of second-generation Major League Baseball players
- Ross Grimsley
