= Bartlesville Boosters =

The Bartlesville Boosters were a minor league baseball team that existed on-and-off from 1907 to 1924. The team, based in Bartlesville, Oklahoma, USA, played in the Oklahoma–Arkansas–Kansas League (1907), Oklahoma–Kansas League (1908) and Western Association (1909–1910, 1924).

Major leaguers Larry Cheney and Art Thomason played for the team in 1907. Cheney returned in 1908 and was joined by Ray Powell and manager Gus Alberts, both of whom also played in the big leagues. George Cochran, Bert Graham, Powell, Claude Thomas and John Vann played for them in 1909. Future Hall of Famer Jake Beckley joined the team as a player-manager in 1910, alongside Verne Clemons, Cochran, Thomas and Lon Ury.
