= Iola Champs =

The Iola Champs were a minor league baseball team that played in the Oklahoma–Kansas League in 1908. They were the first professional team to be based in Iola, Kansas since 1906 and the last until 1946, when the Iola Cubs came into being. The Class-D team did not have a major league affiliation.
