= Shan Deniston =

American athlete and coach (1919–2020)

Biographical details
- Born: February 28, 1919; Long Beach, California, U.S.
- Died: April 4, 2020 (aged 101); San Diego, California, U.S.
- Education: St. Mary's College of California; Pasadena City College; Pepperdine University

Playing career

Baseball
- 1938: St. Mary's
- 1939: Pasadena JC
- 1939: El Paso Texans
- 1940–1942: Portland Beavers
- 1940: Boise Pilots
- 1940: Wenatchee
- 1940: Idaho Falls Russets
- 1940: Big Spring Barons/Odessa Oilers
- 1941: Anaheim Aces
- c. 1945: Pepperdine
- 1947: Mayfield Clothiers
- 1948: Pittsburg Browns
- 1948: Belleville Stags
- 1949: Olean Oilers
- 1950: Audubon Cardinals
- 1951: Lakes-Denison
- 1951: Des Moines Bruins
- 1951: Colorado Springs Sky Sox
- 1952: Kellogg Cardinals
- 1953–1954: Storm Lake White Caps
- 1954: New Ulm
- 1955: Estherville Cardinals/Red Sox

Football
- 1938: St. Mary's
- 1939: Pasadena JC
- 1942: Los Angeles Bulldogs
- 1942, 1945, 1948: Hollywood Bears
- c. 1944: San Diego Bombers
- 1944: El Toro Marine Corps Air Station
- 1946: Los Angeles

Basketball
- c. 1944: Pepperdine
- Positions: Catcher, outfielder, first baseman (baseball) guard, quarterback, halfback (football)

Coaching career (HC unless noted)

Baseball
- 1944: Pepperdine
- 1947: Mayfield Clothiers
- 1948: Pittsburg Browns
- 1948: Belleville Stags
- 1949: Olean Oilers
- 1950–1955: Drake
- 1950: Audubon Cardinals
- 1951: Lakes-Denison
- 1953–1954: Storm Lake White Caps
- 1955: Estherville Cardinals/Red Sox
- 1985–1986: Lincoln HS

Football
- 1946–1948: Pepperdine (GA/E)
- 1949–1955: Drake (E)
- 1956: La Jolla HS
- 1957–1969: Lincoln HS
- 1971–1976: San Diego HS
- 1977–1978: United States International

Basketball
- 1946: Pepperdine (asst.)

Gymnastics
- 1947–1948: Pepperdine

Administrative career (AD unless noted)
- c. 1949–1955: Drake (intramural director)

Accomplishments and honors

Awards
- KITTY League all-star (1947); All-Iowa (1951); San Diego Sports Hall of Champions

Shannon Willis Deniston (February 28, 1919 – April 4, 2020) was an American athlete and sports coach. A native of Long Beach, Deniston attended St. Mary's College of California for one year before starting a professional baseball career in 1939. He played for several minor league teams before serving in World War II at the San Diego Marine Corps Base. While there he also coached the baseball team at Pepperdine University, where he received a degree, and played professional football in the Pacific Coast Professional Football League (PCPFL) and on a military service team. After the war was over Deniston returned to professional baseball as a player-manager, spending 1947 to 1955 both playing for and managing several minor league teams while also serving as a college coach at Pepperdine and Drake University. Deniston retired from playing in 1956 and became a high school football coach, a position he would serve in until 1977, when he was named head coach at United States International University. He retired from coaching in 1987. Deniston became a centenarian in 2019 and died at the age of 101 in 2020.

== Early life and college career ==
Deniston was born on February 28, 1919, in Long Beach, California. He grew up in Compton, and attended Alhambra High School. While at Alhambra he competed in football, track, basketball, and baseball. Deniston was described by The Long Beach Sun as "an outstanding end and one of the best pass grabbers in the Southland prep ranks." Deniston attended St. Mary's College of California for one year, in 1938, before accepting an offer to play professional baseball by the New York Yankees. He also briefly attended Pasadena Junior College in 1939, playing catcher in baseball and halfback in football.

== Playing career ==
=== Baseball (1939–1942) ===
Despite mainly playing first baseman, Deniston was signed by the New York Yankees as an outfielder in 1939. He attended Yankees spring training in St. Petersburg, Florida, before being sent to the minor league class D El Paso Texans of the Arizona–Texas League. The Texans had him play catcher and compete with Art Gagliardi for the starting role. He made his debut against the Tucson Cowboys in a 11–2 win, replacing Curdele Lloyd and making two hits. Overall, in the 1939 season, Deniston played in 117 games, appearing at bat 482 times, and making 139 hits. He made 24 doubles, eight triples, and two home runs.

In the 1940 season, Deniston played for five teams in four different leagues. He started the season with the double-A Portland Beavers of the Pacific Coast League (PCL), appearing in eight games with three hits, before playing for the class-C Boise Pilots of the Pioneer League. He was sent on option to the Idaho Falls Russets, where he appeared in one game before being released. After being released, he played for the Big Spring Barons/Odessa Oilers in the West Texas–New Mexico League, appearing in 12 games. With the Barons/Oilers he made ten hits, three doubles, one triple and two home runs. He also played for a team in Wenatchee, Washington.

In February 1941, Deniston returned to the Portland Beavers on a one-year contract as a catcher. He ended up playing the season in the California League for the Anaheim Aces, appearing in eight games and making three hits. He also spent time with Portland in 1942, but did not appear in any games.

=== Boxing (1940) ===
Deniston briefly was a boxer in 1940, and won the California State Golden Gloves championship in the lightweight division that year.

=== Football (1942–1948) ===
In 1942, Deniston played professional football in the Pacific Coast Professional Football League (PCPFL) for both the Los Angeles Bulldogs and Hollywood Bears, as a right guard for the Bulldogs and a halfback for the Bears. He was described by The Los Angeles Times as a "demon blocker." With the Bears in a game against the Bulldogs, Deniston caught a fifteen-yard pass that set up a Hollywood touchdown.

Deniston attended Pepperdine University in 1943, and spent the year out of sports. In 1944, he was drafted to serve in World War II, and trained at the San Diego Marine Corps Base. That year he played football for the El Toro Flying Marines military service team that compiled a 8–1 record and was ranked number sixteen in the country. Deniston also played for the San Diego Bombers.

In 1945, after being released by the Marines, Deniston returned to the Hollywood Bears in the PCPFL, playing the halfback and quarterback positions. He was a starter in four games. Deniston played for a team in Los Angeles in 1946, and returned for a final time to the Bears in 1948.

=== Basketball (1944) ===
In 1944, Deniston played for the Pepperdine basketball team and served as an assistant coach two years later.

=== Baseball (1945–1955) ===
While in the Marines, bone chips and calcium deposits had weakened Deniston's arm, and he "had given up hope of advancing as a baseball player." Describing his arm, Deniston said he "couldn't throw out Whistler's mother trying to steal second." Despite this, he continued playing, with the Pepperdine Waves baseball team in 1945, and scored a home run in their 20–14 win over UCLA.

After graduating from Pepperdine in 1947, he was named an assistant coach at the school and additionally was named by the St. Louis Browns as a player-manager of the Mayfield Clothiers minor league team. With the Clothiers in 1947, he appeared in 107 total games, appeared at-bat 350 times, and made 105 hits. Of his hits, 21 were doubles, one was a triple, and 15 scored home runs. (Note: The Ponca City News reported 18 home runs in 1948.) His 15 home runs were the largest single-season total he made in his career.

In January 1948, St. Louis Browns business manager J. W. Baker named Deniston a player-manager for the Pittsburg Browns of the Kansas-Oklahoma-Missouri League (KOM). He replaced Jim Crandall who had left for the Aberdeen Pheasants of the Northern League. He appeared in a total of 48 games before resigning mid-season to return to Pepperdine University. He appeared at-bat 129 times, making 34 hits, 15 doubles and three home runs. "When I left the club early to go back to Pepperdine it was three games out of first," Deniston later said. "Then it lost the next sixteen in a row." His position was filled in by Donald Smith.

Deniston was later assigned to coach the Belleville Stags of the Illinois State League. Near the end of the season, Deniston placed second on the team in batting average with a mark of .322. He appeared in a total of 29 games, and was at-bat 107 times, making 35 hits, 11 doubles, one triple, and four home runs. His final batting average was .327.

In 1949, Deniston was named player-manager of the Olean Oilers in the Pennsylvania–Ontario–New York League (PONY). Deniston, 30 years old at the time, was 11 years older than the team average. Deniston appeared in 65 games, mainly as a catcher, and was at-bat 203 times, making 54 hits, seven doubles and seven home runs. He also scored 32 runs-batted-in and had five stolen bases as Olean finished with a record of 39–86. After the season ended, Deniston was named a coach at Drake University as well as manager of the Audubon Cardinals for the 1950 season.

Deniston was with Audubon for 39 games of the 1950 season, playing catcher, before resigning for "the best interest of the team." The Cardinals compiled a record of 18–21 in the Iowa State League (ISL) with Deniston. The following year, he played in the same league for Lakes-Denison serving as a player-manager, before being signed to play in the Western League.

Mid-season in 1951, Deniston was signed to play catcher by the Des Moines Bruins of the Western League. His signing was due to several injuries to their previous players at that position. He batted .281 with them, scoring one home run and three runs-batted-in before being released. The Bruin manager Al Todd said that "he hated to see Deniston leave," but that "with recent player acquisitions, Des Moines was above the maximum limit for salaries paid by a Class-A club." After being released, Deniston was signed by the Colorado Springs Sky Sox of the same league, who needed a catcher after injuries to all their players at the position. Following the season, he was named all-Iowa for his play at Des Moines.

In 1952, Deniston played catcher for the Kellogg Cardinals, and by July held the league lead in batting average with .485. In a win over the Marshalltown Ansons, Deniston scored two home runs.

In 1953, Deniston was named player-manager of the Storm Lake White Caps in the Iowa State League. Against the Carroll Merchants, he scored the game-winning home run in the bottom of the ninth inning. In June, he took the league lead in home runs with three. By July, Deniston had made six home runs, leading the league, and also was ISL runs-batted-in leader with 27. He finished the season tied with Walt Menke for league lead in home runs hit.

In 1954, Deniston started the season with New Ulm, before suffering a broken finger and leaving the team. He later returned to Storm Lake as a player-manager, and finished the season with them.

In 1955, Deniston announced he had accepted a position as catcher, first baseman and manager of the Estherville Cardinals/Red Sox. In a 6–7 loss against Sherburn, Deniston had a "perfect night," hitting two doubles and two singles. After finishing the season with them, Deniston retired and accepted a coaching position at La Jolla High School.

== Coaching career ==
While at Pepperdine in 1944, he served as head coach of their baseball team. In 1946, after returning from World War II, Deniston assisted their football team while also playing the sport professionally. After he graduated from the school in 1947, he was named a full-time assistant football coach, gymnastics coach, and boxing teacher, with the understanding that he would be free to play professional baseball as well. Deniston had also originally accepted a position as baseball coach, but had to resign as he did not have enough time to coach Pepperdine while playing for and managing other teams.

Also in 1947, Deniston was assigned by the St. Louis Browns to play for and manage the Mayfield Clothiers minor league team. He led them to a 72–52 record, with a winning percentage of .581. Following the season, he was named to the Kentucky–Illinois–Tennessee League (KITTY League) all-star team for his work as manager.

In January 1948, St. Louis Browns business manager J. W. Baker named Deniston a player-manager for the Pittsburg Browns of the Kansas-Oklahoma-Missouri League (KOM). He replaced Jim Crandall who had left for the Aberdeen Pheasants of the Northern League. He led them in 48 games before resigning mid-season to return to Pepperdine University. "When I left the club early to go back to Pepperdine it was three games out of first," Deniston later said. "Then it lost the next sixteen in a row." His position was filled in by Donald Smith.

Deniston later was named manager of the Belleville Stags in the Illinois State League. He was a replacement for Jerry Nimitz.

In 1949, Deniston was named player-manager of the Olean Oilers in the Pennsylvania–Ontario–New York League (PONY). But, as "herding a bunch of youngsters (the average Olean player age was 19 years old) poses pitfalls not encountered in higher leagues," the Oilers only won 39 of 125 games under Deniston's leadership, just a .312 winning percentage.

Following the 1949 baseball season, Deniston was named head baseball coach and football ends coach at Drake University. He also accepted a position to be 1950 manager of the Audubon Cardinals in baseball. After Audubon compiled an 18–21 Iowa State League record to start the season, he resigned for "the best interest of the team."

With Drake University, Deniston served as head coach in baseball, an assistant football coach, director of intramurals and as a physical education teacher from 1949 to 1955.

For part of the 1951 season, Deniston played catcher and served as manager for Lakes-Denison in the Iowa State League. In 1952, he served as manager of the Kellogg Cardinals in the Hawkeye State League (HSL).

In 1953, Deniston was named player-manager of the Storm Lake White Caps in the Iowa State League. For the start of the 1954 season, Deniston played for New Ulm, before suffering an injury that made him return to Storm Lake as manager.

In 1955, Deniston announced he had accepted a position as catcher, first baseman and manager of the Estherville Cardinals/Red Sox. After finishing the season with them, Deniston retired and accepted a position as head football coach of La Jolla High School.

After coaching La Jolla High School in 1956, Deniston was named head football coach at Lincoln High School in San Diego for the 1957 season. He replaced Walt Harvey, who had left for Will C. Crawford High School. Deniston ended up coaching the school's football team for thirteen seasons, from 1957 to 1969, winning several championships. From 1964 to 1968, his teams won 41 out of 50 games, a .82 winning percentage. His 1965 team posted a 10–1 record and won the San Diego Section championship game against Point Loma. In 1967, he led them to another 10–1 record with quarterback Jerry Powell, who later played professionally, outscoring opponents 313–75 and winning the championship game. He left following the 1969 season.

Deniston was named head coach at San Diego High School in 1971. He served in that position until resigning in 1976, following a season with just one win out of nine games.

In 1977, Deniston was named head football coach at United States International University. He served in that position for two seasons before being replaced by Tom Walsh; the team folded the next year.

Deniston later returned to Lincoln High School as head baseball coach, spending 1985 to 1986 in that position before retiring.

== Later life and death ==
In 1978, Deniston umpired one game in the National League (NL) when the regular umpires went on strike. He umpired as a volunteer for the game between the New York Mets and San Diego Padres.

Deniston celebrated his 100th birthday on February 28, 2019. He died on April 4, 2020, in San Diego, at the age of 101.

Jerry Powell, who played high school football under Deniston and later professionally, said "from Pop Warner, to high school, college and the pros, I played for a lot of coaches. Without a doubt, Shan Deniston was the best man, the best coach I ever played for. He was truly a blessing and will be sorely missed."

== Head coaching record ==
=== College football ===
Year	Team	Overall	Conference	Standing	Bowl/playoffs
United States International Gulls (NCAA Division II independent) (1977–1978)
1977	United States International	2–9			
1978	United States International	2–8			
United States International:		4–17			
Total:		4–17			
