= Oklahoma–Arkansas–Kansas League =

- Classification: Class D (1907)
- Sport: Minor League Baseball
- First season: 1907
- Folded: September 15, 1907
- Replaced by: Oklahoma-Kansas League
- President: Fred McDaniel (1907)
- No. of teams: 8
- Country: United States of America
- Most titles: 1 Bartlesville Boosters (1907)

The Oklahoma–Arkansas–Kansas League was an eight–team Class D level minor baseball league that existed in 1907. As its name indicates, it consisted of teams from Oklahoma, Arkansas and Kansas.

Its teams were the Bartlesville Boosters, Coffeyville Glassblowers, Fort Smith Soldiers, Independence Champs, McAlester Miners, Muskogee Redskins, Parsons Preachers and Tulsa Oilers.

Notable players include Chick Brandom, Drummond Brown, Larry Cheney, Frank Moore, Art Thomason and Lon Ury. Baseball Hall of Fame member Jake Beckley managed the Tulsa Oilers.

After multiple teams disbanded and withdrew, the league's season was shortened to mid–September. Bartlesville finished in first place.

== Cities represented ==
- Bartlesville, OK: Bartlesville Boosters (1907)
- Coffeyville, KS: Coffeyville Glassblowers (1907)
- Fort Smith, AR: Fort Smith Soldiers (1907)
- Independence, KS: Independence Champs (1907)
- McAlester, OK: South McAlester Miners (1907)
- Muskogee, OK: Muskogee Redskins (1907)
- Parsons, KS: Parsons Preachers (1907)
- Tulsa, OK: Tulsa Oilers (1907)

== Standings and statistics ==
1907 Oklahoma–Arkansas–Kansas League
schedule

Team standings	W	L	PCT	GB	Managers
Bartlesville Boosters	83	51	.619	--	Jack Love / Harry Truby
Coffeyville Glassblowers	71	57	.555	9	Bill Stuart
Independence Champs	68	63	.519	13½	Billy Rupp
Muskogee Redskins	63	70	.474	19½	Lon Ury
Ft. Smith Soldiers	40	46	.465	NA	Cal Pinkerton
South McAlester Miners	11	17	.393	NA	Deacon White
Tulsa Oilers	37	60	.381	NA	Jake Beckley
Parsons Preachers	10	19	.345	NA	Gus Alberts

Parsons and South McAlester withdrew June 2; Ft. Smith and Tulsa disbanded August 6.
The season was shortened to September 15.

Player statistics
Player	Team	Stat	Tot	Player	Team	Stat	Tot
Ernie Wilson	Independence	BA	.292	Howard McClintock	Bartlesville	W	32
Fred Hutchinson	Bartlesville	Runs	84	Howard McClintock	Bartlesville	Pct	.842; 32–6
David White	Bartlesville	Hits	135				
