= Muskogee Redskins =

The Muskogee Redskins were a Class-D minor league baseball team based in Muskogee, Oklahoma that played in the Oklahoma–Arkansas–Kansas League (1907), Oklahoma–Kansas League (1908) and Western Association (1911).

Lon Ury managed the team each year it was in existence under the Redskins name.
