= Charlie Bates (baseball) =

American baseball player (1907–1980)

- Outfielder
- Born: September 17, 1907; Philadelphia, Pennsylvania, U.S.
- Died: January 29, 1980 (aged 72); Topeka, Kansas, U.S.
- Batted: Right Threw: Right

MLB debut
- September 22, 1927, for the Philadelphia Athletics

Last MLB appearance
- October 2, 1927, for the Philadelphia Athletics

MLB statistics
- Batting average: .237
- Fielding percentage: .857
- Putouts: 17
- Stats at Baseball Reference

Teams
- Philadelphia Athletics (1927)

Charles William Bates (September 17, 1907 – January 29, 1980) was an American Major League Baseball outfielder. He played for the Philadelphia Athletics during the 1927 season.
