= Perry Currin =

American baseball player (1928-2011)

- Shortstop
- Born: September 27, 1928; Washington, D.C., U.S.
- Died: January 17, 2011 (aged 82); San Antonio, Texas, U.S.
- Batted: Left Threw: Right

MLB debut
- June 29, 1947, for the St. Louis Browns

Last MLB appearance
- September 17, 1947, for the St. Louis Browns

MLB statistics
- Batting average: .000
- At bats: 2
- Walks: 1
- Stats at Baseball Reference

Teams
- St. Louis Browns (1947)

Perry Gilmore Currin (September 27, 1928 – January 17, 2011) was an American professional baseball player. He appeared in three games in Major League Baseball for the St. Louis Browns of the American League during the 1947 season. Listed at 6' 0", 175 lb., Currin batted left-handed and threw right-handed. He was born in Washington, D.C.

Currin appeared in three games with the Browns, two as a pinch hitter and one as a late inning replacement for shortstop Vern Stephens at the end of a blowout loss to the New York Yankees. Currin went hitless in two at bats while receiving one walk. At 18, he was the third-youngest player in the American League in 1947.

He later played in the minor leagues from 1947 through 1951, compiling a .251 average (498-for-1982) and 21 home runs in 552 games.

Following his baseball career, Currin settled in San Antonio, Texas, where he died at the age of 82.
