= Boyd Bartley =

American baseball player (1920-2012)

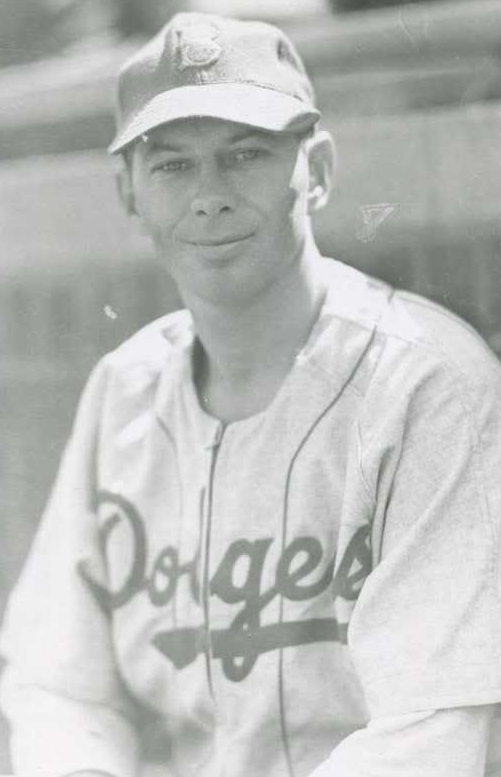
- Bartley in 1943
- Shortstop
- Born: February 11, 1920; Chicago, Illinois, US
- Died: December 21, 2012 (aged 92); Richland Hills, Texas, US
- Batted: Right Threw: Right

MLB debut
- May 30, 1943, for the Brooklyn Dodgers

Last MLB appearance
- June 7, 1943, for the Brooklyn Dodgers

MLB statistics
- Batting average: .048
- Home Runs: 0
- Stats at Baseball Reference

Teams
- Brooklyn Dodgers (1943)

Boyd Owen Bartley (February 11, 1920 – December 21, 2012) was an American baseball player. He played shortstop for the Brooklyn Dodgers in nine games during the 1943 Brooklyn Dodgers season. He was born in Chicago. He served in the military during World War II.
