= Bud Swartz =

American baseball player (1929-1991)

- Pitcher
- Born: June 13, 1929; Tulsa, Oklahoma, U.S.
- Died: June 24, 1991 (aged 62); Los Angeles, California, U.S.
- Batted: Left Threw: Left

MLB debut
- July 12, 1947, for the St. Louis Browns

Last MLB appearance
- July 27, 1947, for the St. Louis Browns

MLB statistics
- Win–loss record: 0–0
- Earned run average: 6.75
- Strikeouts: 1
- Stats at Baseball Reference

Teams
- St. Louis Browns (1947)

Sherwin Merle "Bud" Swartz (June 13, 1929 – June 24, 1991) was an American Major League Baseball pitcher who played for the St. Louis Browns in 1947. He was born in Tulsa, Oklahoma, and was Jewish. He attended University High School in Los Angeles, California.

A single in his only at-bat at 18 years of age left Swartz with a rare major league career batting average of 1.000. He pitched in five games, and gave up four earned runs in 5 1/3 innings.
