= Walter Brown (baseball) =

American baseball player (1915–1991)

- Pitcher
- Born: April 23, 1915; Jamestown, New York, U.S.
- Died: February 3, 1991 (aged 75); Westfield, New York, U.S.
- Batted: Right Threw: Right

MLB debut
- May 16, 1947, for the St. Louis Browns

Last MLB appearance
- September 24, 1947, for the St. Louis Browns

MLB statistics
- Win–loss record: 1-0
- Earned run average: 4.89
- Strikeouts: 10
- Stats at Baseball Reference

Teams
- St. Louis Browns (1947)

Walter Irving Brown (April 23, 1915 – February 3, 1991) was an American professional baseball pitcher. He played part of the 1947 season in Major League Baseball for the St. Louis Browns. His minor league baseball career spanned 18 seasons, from 1936 until 1953.
