= Floyd Temple =

American basketball player and coach (1926–2012)

Biographical details
- Born: February 3, 1926; Coffeyville, Kansas, U.S.
- Died: June 29, 2012 (aged 86); Lawrence, Kansas, U.S.

Coaching career (HC unless noted)
- 1954–1981: Kansas

Head coaching record
- Overall: 437–396–7

Floyd O. Temple (February 3, 1926 – June 29, 2012) was the head coach of the University of Kansas baseball team from 1954 to 1981. He also managed and played in the minor leagues in the early 1950s.

A third baseman, Temple was born in Coffeyville, Kansas, and began his professional career in 1950, playing for the Gladewater Bears of the East Texas League, hitting .167 in 15 games. He played for the Iola Indians of the Kansas–Oklahoma–Missouri League in 1951 and 1952, hitting .292 and .295 respectively. Overall, he hit .278 in 110 minor league games. He also managed the Indians for parts of the 1951 and 1952 seasons.

Following his professional career, he became the head coach of the University of Kansas baseball team. He compiled a record of 437–396–7 in his 28 seasons with the team, becoming its winningest head coach ever. His #13 jersey was placated on the right-center field wall at Hoglund Ballpark.

In 1965, Temple managed the Rapid City Chiefs of the Basin League, a collegiate summer baseball league.

He coached multiple future major league players, including Steve Renko, Bob Allison and Chuck Dobson.

He was inducted into the Kansas Baseball Hall of Fame in 1966. He died, aged 86, in Lawrence, Kansas.

== Head coaching record ==
Record table
Season	Team	Overall	Conference	Standing	Postseason
Kansas Jayhawks (Big Seven Conference / Big Eight Conference) (1954–1981)
1954	Kansas	10–5	4–4	4th	
1955	Kansas	6–16	2–10	7th	
1956	Kansas	14–5	6–5	3rd	
1957	Kansas	11–11	9–8	4th	
1958	Kansas	14–8–2	11–6	4th	
1959	Kansas	9–11	5–11	6th	
1960	Kansas	11–13	7–11	6th	
1961	Kansas	5–14	2–12	8th	
1962	Kansas	16–11	13–8	3rd	
1963	Kansas	15–10	11–8	3rd	
1964	Kansas	16–11	11–10	4th	
1965	Kansas	12–13	8–12	6th	
1966	Kansas	8–17	3–15	8th	
1967	Kansas	12–15	6–13	7th	
1968	Kansas	7–20	4–14	8th	
1969	Kansas	12–14	7–12	6th	
1970	Kansas	15–8	10–7	2nd	
1971	Kansas	11–22	6–15	8th	
1972	Kansas	20–10	11–9	3rd	
1973	Kansas	11–15	5–13	7th	
1974	Kansas	17–22	6–12	7th	
1975	Kansas	15–25	5–13	7th	
1976	Kansas	23–14	6–8	4th	
1977	Kansas	22–23–1	5–5	2nd	
1978	Kansas	34–13–1	8–4	2nd	
1979	Kansas	34–12–1	11–9	3rd	
1980	Kansas	26–19	12–9	3rd	
1981	Kansas	32–19	13–14	3rd	
Total:		437–396–7			
National champion Postseason invitational champion Conference regular season champion Conference regular season and conference tournament champion Division regular season champion Division regular season and conference tournament champion Conference tournament champion
