= Oklahoma–Kansas League =

Former minor baseball league

- Formerly: Oklahoma–Arkansas–Kansas League
- Classification: Class D (1908)
- Sport: Minor League Baseball
- First season: 1908; 118 years ago
- Folded: 1908; 118 years ago
- President: Dr. D.M. Shiveley (1908)
- No. of teams: 6
- Country: United States of America
- Most titles: 1 Tulsa Oilers (1908)
- Related competitions: Western Association; South Central League

The Oklahoma–Kansas League was a six–team minor league baseball league that existed in 1908. As its name indicates, the Class D level league consisted of teams from Oklahoma and Kansas. The league evolved from the 1907 Oklahoma–Arkansas–Kansas League.

== History ==
The teams in the league were the Bartlesville Boosters, Independence Jewelers, Iola Champs, McAlester Miners, Muskogee Redskins and Tulsa Oilers.

Notable players include Larry Cheney, Joe Kelly and Ray Powell. Long–time major league player Deacon White managed in the league.

Before the season ended, McAlister and Iola disbanded. Tulsa won the league finals defeating pennant winner Bartlesville in the Finals.

== Cities represented ==
- Bartlesville, OK: Bartlesville Boosters (1908)
- Independence, KS: Independence Jewelers (1908)
- Iola, KS: Iola Champs (1908)
- McAlester, OK: McAlester Miners (1908)
- Muskogee, OK: Muskogee Redskins (1908)
- Tulsa, OK: Tulsa Oliers (1908)

== 1908 Oklahoma-Kansas League standings ==
schedule

Team standings	W	L	PCT	GB	Managers
Bartlesville Boosters	71	50	.587	--	Harry Truby
Tulsa Oilers	69	55	.556	3½	Deacon White / Stu McBirney
Independence Jewelers	66	58	.532	6½	Art Quiesser
Muskogee Redskins	58	66	.467	14½	Lon Ury / Jay Andrews
Iola Champs	32	34	.485	NA	Tom Hayden
McAlester Miners	17	47	.266	NA	Cy Mason

McAlester disbanded July 5; Iola disbanded July 8.
Playoffs: Bartlesville 2 games, Muskogee 0, for the first half title.
Finals: Tulsa 3 games, Bartlesville 0.
