= Independence, Kansas minor league baseball history =

Independence, Kansas minor league teams
- 1896–1952; (1896, 1906–1908, 1911, 1921–1925, 1928–1932, 1947–1950, 1952); Independence, Kansas

Minor league affiliations
- Class: Independent (1896); Class D (1906–1908, 1911, 1921); Class C (1922–1923); Class D (1924); Class C (1925, 1928–1932); Class D 1947–1950, 1952)
- League: Kansas State League (1896, 1906); Oklahoma-Arkansas-Kansas League (1907); Oklahoma-Kansas League (1908); Western Association (1911); Southwestern League (1921–1924); Western Association (1925, 1928–1932); Kansas-Oklahoma-Missouri League (1947–1950, 1952)

Major league affiliations
- Team: New York Yankees (1947–1950); St. Louis Browns (1952)

Minor league titles
- League titles (5): 1906; 1921; 1930; 1948; 1949

Team data
- Name: Independence Coyotes (1906); Independence Champs (1907); Independence Jewelers (1908); Independence Packers (1911); Independence Producers (1921–1925, 1928–1932); Independence Yankees (1947–1950); Independence Browns (1952)
- Ballpark: Shulthis Stadium

Minor league baseball teams were based in Independence, Kansas in various seasons between 1896 and 1952. Independence teams played as members of the Kansas State League (1896, 1906), Oklahoma-Arkansas-Kansas League (1907), Oklahoma-Kansas League (1908), Western Association (1911), Southwestern League (1921–1924), Western Association (1925, 1928–1932) and Kansas-Oklahoma-Missouri League (1947–1950, 1952), winning five league championships. Independence was a minor league affiliate of the New York Yankees from 1947 to 1950 and the St. Louis Browns in 1952.

The 1921 Independence Producers were ranked #77 on The National Baseball Association's top 100 minor league teams.

Independence possibly hosted the first night game in organized baseball on April 28, 1930, at Riverside Stadium.

Baseball Hall of Fame member Mickey Mantle played for the 1949 Independence Yankees, his first professional season. Hall of Famer Burleigh Grimes was the manager of the 1948 Independence Yankees.

== History ==
Baseball in Independence started with a team in the Kansas State League in 1896. From 1906 to 1911 Independence teams played in four leagues with four different nicknames. From 1921 to 1932, the Independence Producers played as members of the Southwestern League (1921–1924) and the Western Association (1925–1932). The 1921 Producers finished with an overall record of 100–38 and the team is ranked on The National Baseball Association's top 100 minor league teams of all–time.

On August 9, 1908 Gene Packard pitched a perfect game for the Independence Jewelers against the Bartlesville Boosters, with 10 strikeouts.

On July 2, 1930, Independence pitcher Colonel Bob House had nineteen strikeouts against the Springfield Midgets, which was a Western Association league record for strikeouts in a single game. Four days later the Producers had eight home runs in a game against the Muskogee Chiefs setting a league record.

The Independence Yankees were formed in 1947 as an expansion team in the Class D level Kansas-Oklahoma-Missouri League. The franchise remained in the league as an affiliate of the New York Yankees (1947–1950) and St. Louis Browns (1952). The team did not play in 1951, and became the Independence Browns in 1952. The Kansas-Oklahoma-Missouri League permanently folded after the 1952 season.

=== Championship teams ===
In 20 seasons of minor league play, Independence had successes on the field. The 1906 Independence Coyotes won the Kansas State League championship with a 69–48 record. Changing leagues when the Kansas State League folded, the franchise played 1907 as the Independence Champs.

The 1921 Independence Producers finished with a record of 100–38 in taking the Southwestern League Championship. The team is ranked #77 on The National Baseball Association's top 100 minor league teams by MiLB.com and Baseball Historians Bill Weiss and Marshall Wright.

The 1930 Producers were the Western Association Champions, defeating the Joplin Miners in the championship series. It was the first time the series had been played at night.

The 1948 and 1949 Independence Yankees won the Kansas-Oklahoma-Missouri League Championship in back-to-back seasons. Independence finished 74–46 in 1948 under Hall of Fame member Burleigh Grimes and 71–53 under Harry Craft in 1949. The 1949 Independence Yankees featured a 17–year old Mickey Mantle playing shortstop.

After the 1952 Independence Browns, Independence has not hosted another minor league team.

=== Mickey Mantle 1949 ===
In 1949, Mickey Mantle began his professional career with Independence as a 17–year–old. Mantle hit .313 with 7 home runs for the Independence Yankees, as the team finished with 71–53 record and the league championship.

== The ballpark ==
Beginning in 1921, Independence teams played at Riverside Stadium, located on East Oak Street. The stadium was later named Producers Park and Shulthis Stadium. Built in 1918 by A.W. Shulthis, the stadium reportedly hosted the first night game in organized baseball, on April 28, 1930. Now part of the athletic field for Unified School District 446, the original grandstand remained as part of a new multipurpose complex until it was demolished in 2015.

== Timeline ==
Year(s)	# Yrs.	Team	Level	League	Affiliate
1896	1	Independence	Independent	Kansas State League	None
1906	1	Independence Coyotes	Class D	Kansas State League	None
1907	1	Independence Champs	Class D	Oklahoma-Arkansas-Kansas League	None
1908	1	Independence Jewelers	Class D	Oklahoma-Kansas League	None
1911	1	Independence Packers	Class D	Western Association	None
1921	1	Independence Producers	Class D	Southwestern League	None
1922–1923	2	Independence Producers	Class C	Southwestern League	None
1924	1	Independence Producers	Class D	Southwestern League	None
1925, 1928–1932	6	Independence Producers	Class C	Western Association	None
1947–1950	4	Independence Yankees	Class D	Kansas-Oklahoma-Missouri League	New York Yankees
1952	1	Independence Browns	Class D	Kansas-Oklahoma-Missouri League	St. Louis Browns

== Notable Independence alumni ==
- Burleigh Grimes (1948, MGR) Inducted Baseball Hall of Fame, 1964
- Mickey Mantle (1949) Inducted Baseball Hall of Fame, 1974
- Don Taussig (1950)
- Bill Virdon (1950) 1955 National League Rookie of the Year
- Lou Skizas (1949)
- Harry Craft (1949, MGR) Cincinnati Reds Hall of Fame
- Bob Wiesler (1949)
- Jim Finigan (1948)
- Harry Bright (1947)
- Cy Blanton (1931) 2x MLB All-Star; National League ERA leader
- Joe Vance (1931)
- Bill Lewis (1930)
- Bill Walker (1922) MLB All-Star; 2x National League ERA leader
- Glenn Wright (1921)
- Gene Packard (1908)

== See also ==
- Independence Yankees players
- Independence Producers players
- Independence Champs players
- Independence Coyotes players
