= Miami Eagles =

- 1946–1952; Miami, Oklahoma

Minor league affiliations
- Class: Class D (1946–1952)
- League: KOM League (1946–1952)

Major league affiliations
- Team: Philadelphia Phillies (1952); Topeka Owls (1947); Brooklyn Dodgers (1946)

Minor league titles
- League titles (2): 1947; 1952

Team data
- Name: Miami Eagles (1950–1952); Miami Owls (1947–1949); Miami Blues (1946)

The Miami Eagles (also known as the Miami Owls and Miami Blues) was a minor league baseball team located in Miami, Oklahoma. The team played in the Kansas–Oklahoma–Missouri League from 1946 to 1952. In 1947, the team was an affiliate of the Topeka Owls of the Western Association.
