= Jim Crandall =

- Catcher
- Born: December 7, 1912; Wadena, Indiana
- Died: February, 1983 (aged 70)
- Batted: Switch Threw: Right

Middle Atlantic League debut
- 1929, for the Johnstown Johnnies

Last Kansas–Oklahoma–Missouri League appearance
- 1947, for the Pittsburg Browns

Career statistics
- Batting average: .249
- Home runs: 8
- Hits: 393

Teams
- Playing career: Johnstown Johnnies (1932); Kansas City Blues (1934); Des Moines Demons (1935); Indianapolis Indians (1936–1937); Hollywood Stars (1938–1939); Vancouver Capilanos (1940); Toledo Mud Hens (1945); Pittsburg Browns (1946–1947); Managerial career: Vancouver Capilanos (1940); Pittsburg Browns (1946–1947); Aberdeen Pheasants (1948); Springfield Browns (1949); Pittsburg Browns (1950); Dayton Indians (1951); York White Roses (1952); San Antonio Missions (1953); Burlington Bees (1954); Duluth Dukes (1955); Ogden Reds (1955)

James Mark Crandall (December 7, 1912 – February 1983) was an American professional baseball player, manager and coach. In his only Major League service, he served as a coach on the last St. Louis Browns team in history, the 1953 edition.

Born in Wadena, Indiana, he was the son of Doc Crandall, a star pitcher with the New York Giants from 1908 to 1913, and one of the game's top early relief pitchers.

Jim Crandall's professional baseball career was confined to minor league baseball, except for the latter half of the 1953 Major League season, when he swapped jobs with Bill Norman, who was on the coaching staff of Brownie manager Marty Marion. Crandall had begun the year as skipper of the San Antonio Missions of the Double-A Texas League, where he lasted into July before taking Norman's old post with the Browns.

Losers of 100 games, St. Louis' last American League entry finished eighth and last, 46 1/2 games behind the New York Yankees. Owner Bill Veeck was pressured into selling the team to Baltimore interests, who shifted the club to their city for 1954. Marion and Crandall were not retained by the new ownership and management team, and Crandall resumed his minor league career. A switch-hitting catcher and right-handed pitcher, he played in 1932, 1934–1940 and 1945–1947. He managed in 1940 and from 1946 to 1955, spending much of that time working in the farm systems of the Browns and Cincinnati Redlegs.

He died in February 1983 at age 70 in Bullhead City, Arizona, although no specific date of death has been listed.
