= Ross Grimsley (1950s pitcher) =

American baseball player (1922–1994)

- Pitcher
- Born: June 4, 1922; Americus, Kansas, U.S.
- Died: February 6, 1994 (aged 71); Memphis, Tennessee, U.S.
- Batted: Left Threw: Left

MLB debut
- September 3, 1951, for the Chicago White Sox

Last MLB appearance
- September 30, 1951, for the Chicago White Sox

MLB statistics
- Win–loss record: 0–0
- Earned run average: 3.86
- Strikeouts: 8
- Stats at Baseball Reference

Teams
- Chicago White Sox (1951)

Ross Albert Grimsley Sr. (June 4, 1922 – February 6, 1994) was an American Major League Baseball pitcher who appeared in seven games for the Chicago White Sox in 1951. He threw left-handed.

Grimsley was signed by the St. Louis Cardinals before the 1948 season and then drafted by the Brooklyn Dodgers in the 1950 minor league draft. Late in the 1951 season, his contract was purchased by the White Sox, where he made his only major league appearances during September of that season.

Grimsley's son, named Ross, had an 11-year major league career, also as a left-handed pitcher.
