= Harry Truby =

American baseball player (1870–1953)

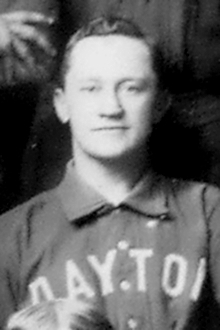
- Second baseman
- Born: May 12, 1870; Ironton, Ohio, U.S.
- Died: March 21, 1953 (aged 82); Ironton, Ohio, U.S.
- Batted: Unknown Threw: Right

MLB debut
- August 21, 1895, for the Chicago Colts

Last MLB appearance
- July 14, 1896, for the Pittsburgh Pirates

MLB statistics
- Batting average: .281
- Home runs: 2
- Runs batted in: 50
- Stats at Baseball Reference

Teams
- Chicago Colts (1895–1896); Pittsburgh Pirates (1896)

Harry Garvin Truby (May 12, 1870 – March 21, 1953) was an American infielder in the Major Leagues in 1895 and 1896. Truby played for the Chicago Colts and Pittsburgh Pirates.

In 70 games over two seasons, Truby posted a .281 batting average (73-for-260) with 31 runs, 2 home runs and 50 RBI. He recorded a .944 fielding percentage as a second baseman.
