= Bill Stuart =

American baseball player (1873–1928)

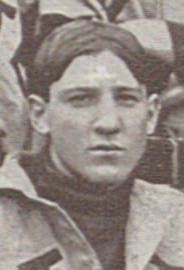
- Stuart on the 1894 Penn State baseball team
- Infielder
- Born: August 28, 1873; Boalsburg, Pennsylvania, U.S.
- Died: October 14, 1928 (aged 55); Fort Worth, Texas, U.S.
- Batted: Right Threw: Right

MLB debut
- August 15, 1895, for the Pittsburgh Pirates

Last MLB appearance
- September 7, 1899, for the New York Giants

MLB statistics
- Batting average: .238
- Home runs: 0
- RBI: 10
- Stats at Baseball Reference

Teams
- Pittsburgh Pirates (1895); New York Giants (1899)

William Alexander "Chauncey" Stuart (August 28, 1873 – October 14, 1928) was an American professional baseball middle infielder and an American football player and coach. He played major league baseball with the Pittsburgh Pirates in 1895 and the New York Giants in 1899.

== Early life ==
Stuart was born on August 28, 1873, in Boalsburg, Pennsylvania. He attended Penn State University, where he played on the varsity football and baseball teams.

== Baseball career ==
Listed at 5'11" and 170 pounds, Stuart threw and batted right-handed. He made his big league debut on August 15, 1895, with the Pittsburgh Pirates at the age of 21, playing 19 games that year (2 at second base and 17 as shortstop) and hitting .247 with 0 home runs and 10 RBI. He returned to the Major Leagues in 1899 to play for the New York Giants (playing only one game at second base that season) and collected zero hits in three at-bats. Stuart's overall career fielding percentage was unremarkable, at .912.

== Football career ==
Stuart played fullback on the Penn State football team. In 1895, he played the same position for the Pittsburgh Athletic Club, one of the first football teams to pay players. He was known as an outstanding kicker.

From 1896 until 1899 he was the coach and star fullback of the Company C team of Bradford, Pennsylvania, which in its best year, 1897, won all of its 11 games by a combined score of 388 to 0.

== Later life ==
Stuart later became an oil operator in Oklahoma. Alongside his oil career, he tried his hand at managing a theater in Tulsa and running a publication called Baseball World. In 1922, he was shot in a hunting accident when his guide mistook him for a deer; the bullet passed through his arm and entered his hip. He was still recovering months later. He died on October 14, 1928, at age 55, in Fort Worth, Texas. His body was laid to rest in Spring Creek Presbyterian Cemetery in State College, Pennsylvania.
