= Ted Gullic =

American baseball player

- Outfielder
- Born: January 2, 1907; Koshkonong, Missouri, U.S.
- Died: January 28, 2000 (aged 93); West Plains, Missouri, U.S.
- Batted: Right Threw: Right

MLB debut
- April 15, 1930, for the St. Louis Browns

Last MLB appearance
- October 1, 1933, for the St. Louis Browns

MLB statistics
- Batting average: .247
- Home runs: 9
- Runs batted in: 79
- Stats at Baseball Reference

Teams
- St. Louis Browns (1930, 1933)

Tedd Jasper Gullic (January 2, 1907 – January 28, 2000) was an American outfielder in Major League Baseball. He played for the St. Louis Browns.
