= Ponca City Baseball team =

Ponca City
- 1923–1957; (1923–1924, 1926, 1934–1938, 1947–1952, 1954–1957); Ponca City, Oklahoma

Minor league affiliations
- Previous classes: Class D (1923–1924, 1926, 1934–1938, 1947–1952, 1954–1957)
- Previous leagues: Sooner State League (1955–1957); Western Association (1954); Kansas–Oklahoma–Missouri League (1947–1952); Western Association (1934–1938); Southwestern League (1926); Oklahoma State League (1923–1924)

Major league affiliations
- Previous teams: Chicago Cubs (1955–1957); Brooklyn Dodgers (1947–1952); Chicago Cubs (1934–1938)

Minor league titles
- League titles: 4 (1935, 1936, 1938, 1950)

Team data
- Previous names: Ponca City Cubs (1955–1957); Ponca City Jets (1954); Ponca City Dodgers (1947–1952); Ponca City Angels (1934–1938); Ponca City Poncans (1923–1924, 1926)
- Previous parks: Conoco Park/Continental Park (1923–1924, 1926, 1934–1938, 1947–1952, 1954–1957)

Ponca City, Oklahoma was home to numerous minor league baseball teams between 1923 and 1957, playing at Conoco Park. Ponca City played as members of the Oklahoma State League (1923–1924), Southwestern League (1926), Western Association (1934–1938), Kansas–Oklahoma–Missouri League (1947–1952) and Western Association (1954). Ponca City was an affiliate of the Chicago Cubs (1934–1938), Brooklyn Dodgers (1947–1952) and Chicago Cubs (1955–1957).

Baseball Hall of Fame member Billy Williams played for the Ponca City Cubs in 1956–1957.

== History ==
The first version of the team, the Ponca City Poncans, began play in 1923, when the Drumright Boosters franchise of the Oklahoma State League relocated to Ponca City. During the 1926 season, they relocated to become the Eureka Oilers.

The Ponca City Angels played from 1934–1938 before moving to St. Joseph, Missouri and becoming the St. Joseph Angels. This version of the team won three league titles in the Western Association.

The Ponca City Dodgers were a minor league baseball "Class D" affiliate of the Brooklyn Dodgers that operated from 1947–1952. The team was based in Ponca City, Oklahoma and played in the Kansas–Oklahoma–Missouri League.

The Ponca City Jets played in 1954 only and were replaced in 1955 when the Gainesville Owls moved to town and became the Ponca City Cubs in the Sooner State League.

== The ballpark ==
Ponca City teams played at Conoco Park. Conoco Park had dimensions of (LF–CF–RF) 350–495–300 and a seating capacity of 4,000 (1936) and 3,000 (1947). It was located on the grounds of Conoco, formerly known as Continental Oil and Transportation Company. The park was named after the company, and thus was previously called Continental Park. The field was south of West South Avenue between the intersections of that road with South Palm and South Elm Streets. The area is now a parking lot.

== Notable Ponca City alumni ==
Baseball Hall of Fame alumni

- Billy Williams (1956–1957)

Notable alumni

- Red Barrett (1935)
- Joe Berry (1935)
- Jim Brewer (1956)
- Paul Erickson (1937)
- Lou Johnson (1956)
- Newt Kimball (1934)
- Hub Kittle (1937–1938)
- Peanuts Lowrey (1938)
- Steve Mesner (1934)
- Dee Moore (1934-1935)
- Lou Novikoff (1937)
- Vern Olsen (1937)
- Rip Russell (1935)
- Joe Stanka (1950–1951)
