= Iola Cubs =

- (1902-1904, 1906-1908, 1946-1952, 1954); Iola, Kansas

Minor league affiliations
- Previous classes: Class D (1946-1952); Class C (1954)
- Previous leagues: Western Association (1954); Kansas-Oklahoma-Missouri League (1946-1952); Oklahoma-Kansas League (1908); Kansas State League (1906); Missouri Valley League (1902-1904)

Major league affiliations
- Previous teams: Chicago Cubs (1946-1947); Cleveland Indians (1948-1952)

Minor league titles
- League titles: 3 (1904, 1946)
- Division titles: 1952

Team data
- Name: Iola Cubs (1946-1947)
- Previous names: Iola Indians (1948-1952, 1954); Iola Champs (1908); Iola Grays (1906); Iola Gasbags (1902, 1904); Iola Gaslighters (1903)
- Previous parks: Riverside Municipal Ballpark
- Owner/ Operator: Earl Sifers

The Iola Cubs was the first and primary name of the Class Kansas–Oklahoma–Missouri League minor league baseball team based in Iola, Kansas, USA, that played in 1946 and 1947. The Iola Cubs were preceded by other early 1900s Iola minor league teams and succeeded by the Iola Indians. Iola won league championships in 1904 and 1946.

== History ==
The 1946 Iola Cubs were the first professional baseball team based in Iola since the 1908 Iola Champs. The Iola Cubs were an affiliate of the Chicago Cubs, playing in the Kansas-Oklahoma-Missouri League. Managed by Al Reitz both years, the team finished second and third in the standings in 1946 and 1947, respectively, and reached the league finals both seasons.

Remaining in the Kansas-Oklahoma-Missouri League, Iola became an affiliate of the Cleveland Indians in 1948 and played as the Iola Indians in 1948–1952. After disbanding in 1953, the Iola Indians played a final season in the Western Association in 1954.

Decades earlier, the Iola Gasbags (1902, 1904) and Iola Gaslighters (1903) played in the Missouri Valley League. The 1906 Iola Grays, of the Kansas State League, moved to Cherryvale, Kansas on June 15, 1906, becoming the Cherryvale Boosters. The 1908 Iola Champs, of the Oklahoma-Kansas League, had disbanded on July 8, 1908.

== The ballpark ==
For the duration of the professional franchises, Iola home games were played at Riverside Municipal Ballpark, which is within Riverside Park. The ballpark was a Works Project Administration project. Located at 418 Park Avenue and South State Street in Iola, Kansas, the ballpark and adjacent park grounds are still in use today. The ballpark with a track and stands are utilized by Iola's US$257 school district sports teams.

== Notable alumni ==
- Woody Fair (1952, MGR)
- Larry Milton (1904)
- Willie Ramsdell (1954, Player/MGR)
- Floyd Temple (1952, MGR)
- Bill Upton (1949)

== Season-by-season ==
Year	Record	Manager	Finish	Playoffs/notes
1946	63-57	Al Reitz	3rd	Finals Tied 3-3
1947	69-57	Al Reitz	2nd	Lost in league finals
1948	51-22	Al Reitz	7th	No playoffs held
1949	70-55	Winlow Johnson	3rd	Lost in league finals
1950	38-84	Winlow Johnson	7th	No playoffs held
1951	38-84	Forrest L. Crawford / Al Reitz / Mason Pool / Floyd Temple	6th	No playoffs held
1952	70-47	Floyd Temple / Woody Fair	1st	Won league pennant Lost in league finals
1954	39-101	Willie Ramsdell (2–17) / Ralph Kennedy (37–84)	8th	No playoffs held
