= Lon Ury =

American baseball player (1877–1918)

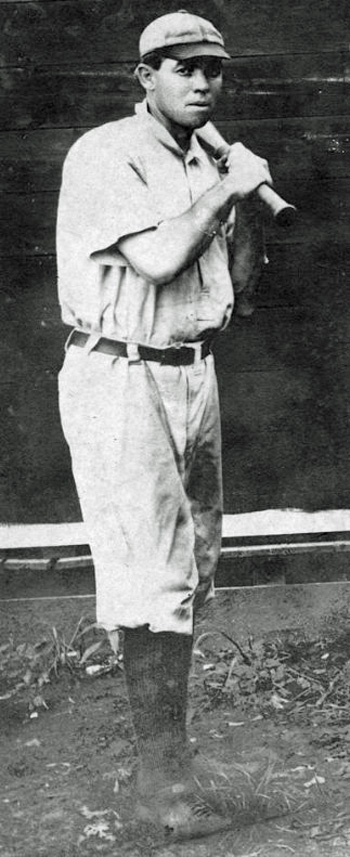
- First baseman
- Born: April , 1877; Fort Scott, Kansas, U.S.
- Died: March 4, 1918; Kansas City, Missouri, U.S.
- Batted: Unknown Threw: Right

MLB debut
- September 9, 1903, for the St. Louis Cardinals

Last MLB appearance
- September 12, 1903, for the St. Louis Cardinals

MLB statistics
- Batting average: .167
- Home runs: 0
- Runs batted in: 0
- Stats at Baseball Reference

Teams
- St. Louis Cardinals (1903)

Louis Newton "Lon" Ury (1877 – March 4, 1918), nicknamed "Old Sheep", was an American Major League Baseball first baseman during the end of the 1903 season.

He played in two games for the St. Louis Cardinals on September 9 and September 12, both at Robison Field in St. Louis. He did very well in the field, handling 24 chances without an error. At the plate, he went 1-for-7 for a .143 batting average.

One of his teammates on the 1903 Cardinals was Hall of Famer Mordecai "Three Finger" Brown.

Ury died at the age of 40 or 41 in Kansas City, Missouri.
