= Arkansas City, Kansas, minor league baseball history =

Arkansas City, Kansas, minor league baseball teams
- 1887–1926; (1887, 1909–1910, 1924–1926); Arkansas City, Kansas

Minor league affiliations
- Class: Independent (1887); Class D (1909–1910, 1924–1926)
- League: Kansas State League (1887, 1909–1910); Southwestern League (1924–1926)

Major league affiliations
- Team: None

Minor league titles
- League titles (1): 1924
- Wild card berths (1): 1924

Team data
- Name: Arkansas City (1887); Arkansas City-Winfield Twins (1909); Arkansas City Grays (1910); Arkansas City Osages (1924–1926)
- Ballpark: Association Park (1909–1910); League Park (1924–1926)

Minor league baseball teams were based in Arkansas City, Kansas, in various seasons between 1887 and 1926. Arkansas City teams played as members of the Kansas State League in 1887 and 1909 to 1910 and the Southwestern League from 1924 to 1926.

== History ==
Minor league baseball in Arkansas City, Kansas, began in the 1887 season. The Arkansas City team played as members of the six–team Independent level Kansas State League, which reduced to four teams during the season. Arkansas City placed second in the league standings with a record of 19–20, playing under managers W.F. Wingate, Billy Hunter and Luke Short. Arkansas City finished 3.0 games behind the first place Wellington Browns in the final standings. The Kansas State League did not return to play the 1888 season.

In 1909, the Arkansas City-Winfield Twins resumed play in the Kansas State League and in partnership with nearby Winfield, Kansas. The "Twins" became members of the reformed eight–team Class D level Kansas State League. Arkansas City-Winfield joined the Great Bend Millers, Hutchinson Salt Packers, Larned Cowboys, Lyons Lions, McPherson Merry Macks, Newton Railroaders and Wellington Dukes as 1909 league members.

In 1909 Kansas State League play, the Arkansas City-Winfield Twins placed seventh in the 1909 standings. The Twins finished with a 41–56 overall record to end the season in 7th place in the eight–team league. Playing under managers M.E. Parks, Frank Layne and Bennie Owens, the Twins finished 19.5 games behind the first place Lyons Lions in the final Kansas State League standings.

Continuing play as members of the 1910 Kansas State League, the Arkansas City Grays finished the season in last place. The Grays ended the season with a record of 40–67 to finish in eighth place. The team was managed by Roy Baker, Billy Hunter, L. Evans and M.E. Parks. The Grays finished 29.0 games behind the first place Hutchinson Salt Packers in the final 1910 standings of the eight–team league.

In 1924, Arkansas City returned to minor league play as members of the 1924 Class D level Southwestern League and the Arkansas City "Osages" won the league championship. Arkansas City joined the Coffeyville Refiners, Emporia Traders, Enid Harvesters, Eureka Oilers, Independence Producers, Newton Railroaders and Salina Millers teams in league play. Finishing with a regular season record of 70–61, the Osages placed third, playing under managers Rube Geyer and Ed Yuna. Fuzzy Hufft of Arkansas City led the league with 28 home runs and a .367 batting average. In the playoff Finals, the Arkansas City Osages defeated the Newton Railroaders 4 gamed to 3 to capture the Southwestern League championship.

The Arkansas City use of the "Osages" moniker corresponds to local history, geography and business. Located in the Osage region, the city became host to the Osage Hotel in 1920. The hotel building is located at 100 North Summit Street in Arkansas City, Kansas.

Continuing play in the 1925 Southwestern League, the Arkansas City Osages placed third in the final standings, missing the playoffs. With a regular season record of 65–63, playing under manager Ed Yuna. Arkansas City finished 8.0 games behind the first place Salina Millers. Player/manager Ed Yuna led the Southwestern League with both 28 home runs and 205 total hits.

The Arkansas City Osages played their final season in 1926 as the Southwestern League reduced to six teams. The Osages placed fourth with a record of 54–62. Playing under managers Russ McMullan and Zuidal Zunigha, Arkansas City ended their final season 21.5 games behind the first place Salina Millers in the league standings. The Southwestern League folded following the 1926 season.

Arkansas City, Kansas, has not hosted another minor league team.

== The ballparks ==
In 1909 and 1910, Arkansas City minor league teams were noted to have played home games at Association Park. The ballpark was located on East Madison Street on the east side of the railroad tracks, separated from the city center. League Park could not be accessed by streetcar due to the inability to obtain a right-of-way for a spur line across the tracks. There was sentiment at the time to move the field to a location at the north end of Summit street that would be accessible by streetcar, but this did not happen. The reported capacity of Association Park was 700–1,000, with every Wednesday serving as Ladies' Day.

The Arkansas City Osages of 1924 to 1926 hosted played home minor league games at League Park, also known as Southwestern League Park. It was noted games had 2:30 P.M. start on Saturday and Sunday games and 4:15 P.M. for weekday contests. The location was reported to be on East Kansas Street, at the end of North Summit Street, Arkansas City, Arkansas. At the time, Summit Street, which was the main business street for the city of Arkansas City, terminated on the north end of town at Kansas Avenue. The League Park site was the same location at the end of the Summit Street streetcar line that had been considered when arguments were made to relocate the field used by the Arkansas City Grays in 1910. Today, the Rindt-Erdman Funeral Home and Crematory, formerly Rindt Memorial Chapel, sits on the land formerly occupied by League Park.

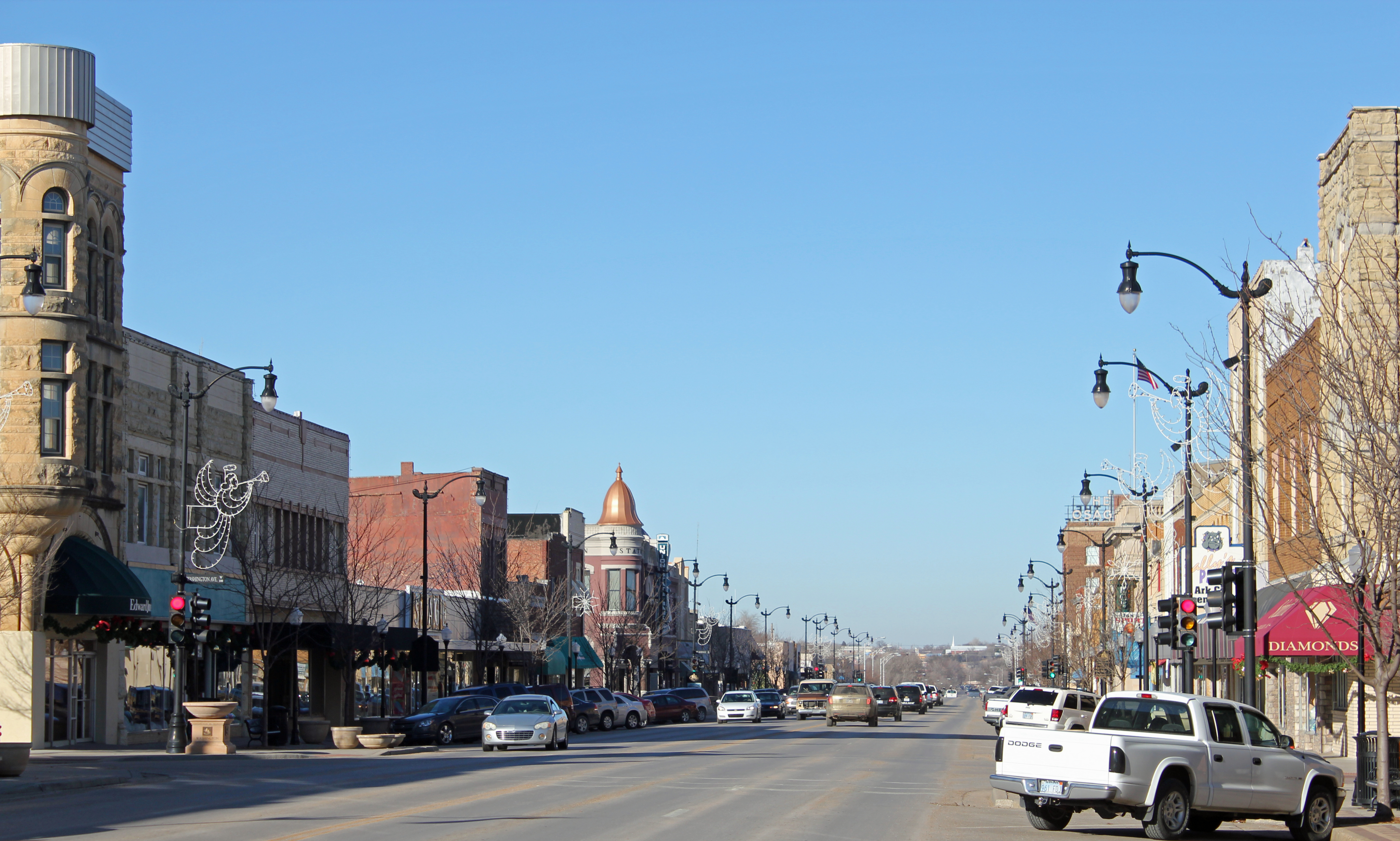
(2013) Arkansas City Commercial District. National Register of Historic Places. Arkansas City, Kansas

== Timeline ==
Year(s)	# Yrs.	Team	Level	League	Ballparl\k
1887	1	Arkansas City	Independent	Kansas State League	Unknown
1909	1	Arkansas City-Winfield Twins	Class D	Kansas State League	Association Park
1910	1	Arkansas City Grays	Class D	Kansas State League	Association Park
1924–1926	3	Arkansas City Osages	Class D	Southwestern League	League Park

== Year–by–year records ==
Year	Record	Finish	Manager	Playoffs/Notes
1887	19–20	2nd	W.F. Wingate; Billy Hunter/Luke Short	League folded August 8
1909	41–56	7th	M.E. Parks; Frank Layne/Bennie Owens	No playoffs Held
1910	40–67	8th	Roy Baker / Billy Hunter / L. Evans / M.E. Parks	No playoffs held
1924	70–61	3rd	Rube Geyer / Ed Yuna	League champions
1925	65–63	3rd	Ed Yuna	Did not qualify
1926	54–62	4th	Russ McMullan / Zuidal Zunigha	Did not qualify

== Notable alumni ==
- Roy Evans (1910)
- Jack Rothrock (1925)
- Joe Sprinz (1926)
- Yats Wuestling (1909)

== See also ==
Arkansas City Osages players
Arkansas City Grays players
