= Fort Scott Giants =

US Minor League

- 1902–1906; (1901-1906); Fort Scott, Kansas

Minor league affiliations
- Class: Independent (1901); Class D (1902-1903); Class C (1904–1905); Class D (1906)
- League: Missouri Valley League (1901–1905); Kansas State League (1906)

Major league affiliations
- Team: None

Minor league titles
- League titles (0): None

Team data
- Name: Fort Scott Memphis Route (1901); Fort Scott Giants (1902–1906)
- Ballpark: Fort Scott National Historic Site* (1901-1906)

The Fort Scott Giants were a minor league baseball team based in Fort Scott, Kansas. From 1901 to 1905, Fort Scott teams played as a member of the Missouri Valley League, before joining the 1906 Kansas State League. The 1901 team was known as the Fort Scott "Memphis Route."

== History ==
Fort Scott first hosted minor league baseball in 1891, when the "Fort Scott" team played the season as members of the independent Southwest League.

The "Fort Scott Memphis Route" team became a member of the 1901 independent Missouri Valley League. The Columbus, Kansas, Galena, Kansas, Joplin Colts, Monett Railroadmen, Nevada Reds, Oswego, Kansas and Pittsburg Coal Barons teams joined Fort Scott in league play. The 1901 league records and standings are unknown.

In 1902, Fort Scott continued play in the Class D level Missouri Valley League, as the Nevada, Missouri and Joplin, Missouri teams also continued play. The Coffeyville Indians, Iola Gasbags, Jefferson City Convicts, Joplin Miners, Nevada Lunatics, Sedalia Gold Bugs and Springfield Reds teams joined Fort Scott in beginning league play on May 6, 1902.

The Giants placed third in the 1902 Missouri Valley League final standings, as the league held no playoffs. With a record of 80–44, playing the season under manager Warren Gill, Fort Scott finished 6.0 games behind the first place Nevada Lunatics in the standings.

The 1903 Fort Scott Giants continued as members of the eight–team Class D level Missouri Valley League, as the Leavenworth White Sox replaced Coffeyville in league play before folding during the season, as did Nevada. The Giants placed fifth of the six remaining teams in the Missouri Valley League standings. Fort Scott ended the 1903 season with a record of 71–64, with Fred Hornaday serving as manager. After Nevada and Leavenworth had folded during the season, Fort Scott ended the season 15½ games behind the first place Sedalia Goldbugs, who finished with a record of 86–47.

The Fort Scott Giants continued Missouri Valley League play in 1904 and finished last as the league became a Class C level League with eight teams. The Giants ended the season with a record of 36–89, placing eighth in the standings. Jake Bene and Lou Armstrong served as managers. The Coal Diggers finished 47½ gamed behind the first place Iola Gasbags.

The Fort Scott Giants placed fourth in the final season of the Missouri Valley League, as the league folded during the season. With a record of 49–52, the Giants finished 26.0 games behind the first place Pittsburg Miners. Harry Chapman served as manager. Fort Scott was also referred to as the "Hay Diggers" in 1905. The Muskogee Reds disbanded on August 31, causing the Missouri Valley League to end play on September 5, 1905.

In 1906, the Fort Scott Giants continued minor league play, as the franchise joined the eight-team, Class D level Kansas State League. The Giants joined the Bartlesville Indians, Chanute Browns, Coffeyville Bricks, Independence Coyotes, Iola Grays, Parsons Preachers and Pittsburg Champs in beginning league play on May 3, 1906.

On June 6, 1906, the Pittsburg Champs franchise moved to Vinita, Oklahoma. On July 5, 1906, both the Fort Scott and Vinita franchised folded during the season. The Fort Scott Giants ended their final season with a record of 35–18, as Ed Finney, Cy Mason and M. McDonald served as managers. After the two teams folded, the league discarded all games played before July 10 and restarted with a new season. The league did not return to play in 1907.

The Kansas State League resumed play in 1909, but without a Fort Scott franchise. Fort Scott has not hosted another minor league team.

== The ballpark ==
The name and location of the Fort Scott Giants' home minor league ballpark are not directly referenced. 1902 newspaper accounts refer to fans interacting with the "guards" present on the "grounds" at the site of the Fort Scott ballpark. The verbiage corresponds with Fort Scott being home to the Fort Scott National Historic Site.

== Timeline ==
Year(s)	# Yrs.	Team	Level	League
1901	1	Fort Scott Memphis Route	Independent	Missouri Valley League
1902-1903	2	Fort Scott Giants	Class D	Missouri Valley League
1904-1905	2	Fort Scott Giants	Class C	Missouri Valley League
1906	1	Fort Scott Giants	Class D	Kansas State League

== Year–by–year records ==
Year	Record	Finish	Manager	Playoffs/Notes
1902	80–44	3rd	Warren Gill	No playoffs held
1903	71–64	5th	Fred Hornaday	No playoffs held
1904	39–84	8th	Jake Bene / Lou Armstrong	No playoffs held
1905	49–52	4th	Harry Chapman	League folded September 5
1906	35–18	NA	Ed Finney / Cy Mason; M. McDonald	Team folded July 5

== Notable alumni ==
- Raleigh Aitchison (1906)
- Harry Berte (1902)
- Bobby Byrne (1904)
- Bill Carney (1904)
- Harry Cheek (1903)
- Red Downs (1903)
- Blaine Durbin (1904)
- Warren Gill (1902, MGR)
- Bob Groom (1904)
- Harry Huston (1902–1903)
- Tex Jones (1904)
- Owen Shannon (1902)
- Bill Shipke (1903)
- Lon Ury (1902)

== See also ==
- Fort Scott Giants players
