= El Dorado Crushers =

- 1911; El Dorado, Kansas

Minor league affiliations
- Class: Class D (1911)
- League: Kansas State League (1911)

Major league affiliations
- Team: None

Minor league titles
- League titles (0): None

Team data
- Name: El Dorado Crushers (1911)
- Ballpark: Main Park (1911)

The El Dorado Crushers were a minor league baseball team based in El Dorado, Kansas. In 1911, the Crushers played as members of the Class D level Kansas State League, hosting home games at Main Park.

== History ==
Minor league baseball in El Dorado, Kansas began in 1911. The El Dorado Crushers became members of the eight–team Class D level Kansas State League, replacing the Arkansas City Grays franchise in the league. The Great Bend Millers, Hutchinson Salt Packers, Larned Wheat Kings, Lyons Lions, McPherson Merry Macks, Newton Railroaders and Wellington Dukes joined El Dorado as 1911 league members.

Beginning their first season of play on May 11, 1911, the El Dorado Crushers of the Kansas State League ended the 1911 season with a record of 15–33, playing a shortened season. On July 11, 1911, the Kansas State League disbanded, reportedly due to crop failures and drought. When the league ceased play, Eldorado was in seventh place in the standings. Bill Annis and Walter Sizemore served as managers, as the Crushers finished 18.5 games behind the first place Great Bend Millers in the shortened season.

The Kansas State League didn't return to play in the 1912 season. When the league resumed play in 1913, the El Dorado franchise wasn't included as a league member. El Dorado has not hosted another minor league team by name.

El Dorado, Kansas next hosted another high level baseball team in 1996, when the El Dorado Broncos began play as members of the summer collegiate Jayhawk League, remaining in the league through 2018. Beginning in 2021, minor league baseball returned to El Dorado, when the Salina "Stockade " began playing some games in El Dorado as members of the Independent level Pecos League.

== The ballpark ==
The 1911 El Dorado Crushers played home minor league games at Main Park. It was noted that the ballpark had a capacity of 1,000 and home game starting times were 3:00 p.m. on Sunday and 4:00 p.m. on weekdays. Today, North Main Park is still in use as a public park with amenities. The location is 1000 North Main, El Dorado, Kansas. El Dorado teams play today at historic McDonald Stadium, built through the Works Progress Administration in 1940.

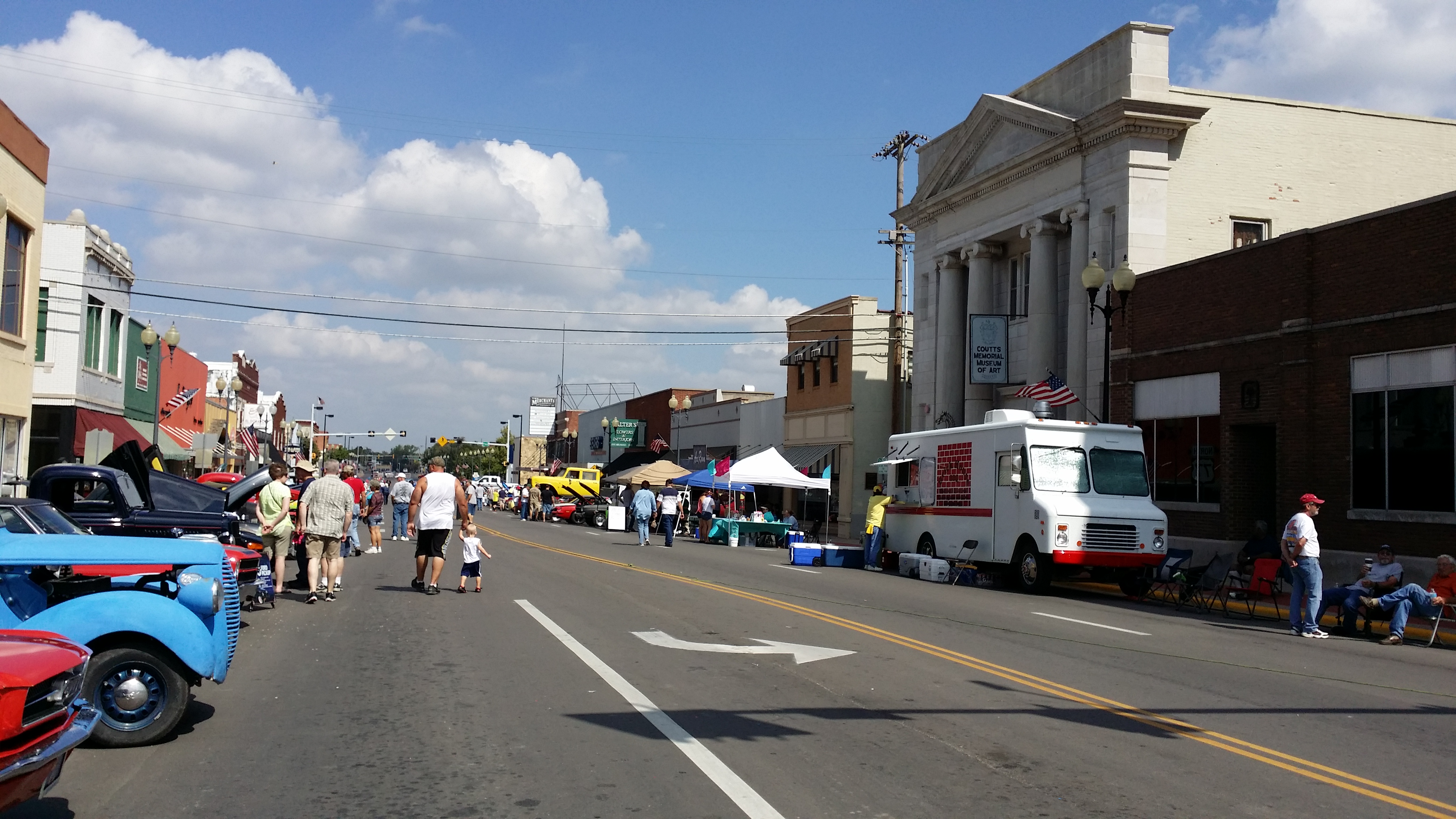
(2014) Main Street. El Dorado, Kansas

== Year–by–year record ==
| Year | Record | Finish | Manager | Playoffs/Notes |
|---|---|---|---|---|
| 1911 | 15–33 | 7th | Bill Annis / Walter Sizemore | League folded July 11 |

== Notable alumni ==
- Jake Kafora (1911)
- El Dorado Crushers players

== External references ==
El Dorado - Baseball Reference
