= Iola Gasbags =

- 1902–1904; (1902-1904, 1906); Iola, Kansas

Minor league affiliations
- Class: Class D (1902-1903); Class C (1904); Class D (1906)
- League: Missouri Valley League (1902–1904); Kansas State League (1906)

Major league affiliations
- Team: None

Minor league titles
- League titles (1): 1904

Team data
- Name: Iola Gasbags (1903, 1905); Iola Gaslights (1904); Iola Grays (1906)
- Ballpark: Riverside Park (1902-1904, 1906)

The Iola Gasbags were a minor league baseball team based in Iola, Kansas. Between 1902 and 1906, Iola teams played as a member of the Missouri Valley League from 1902 to 1904 and the 1906 Kansas State League. The Iola Gasbags won the 1904 Missouri State League championship, before adopting the Iola "Grays" nickname for the 1906 Kansas State League season. The Iola teams hosted home minor league games at Riverside Park.

== History ==
In 1901, the independent Missouri Valley League was formed, an eight-team league without an Iola franchise.

In 1902, the Iola "Gasbags" began play in the Class D level Missouri Valley League. The Fort Scott Giants, Nevada Lunatics and Joplin Miners teams continued league play from the previous season. The Iola Gasbags, Coffeyville Indians, Jefferson City Convicts, Sedalia Gold Bugs and Springfield Reds teams all joined as new members, with the league beginning play on May 6, 1902.

The Iola "Gasbags" team nickname corresponds to the local oil and gas industry. In 1895, natural gas pools were discovered in the Iola area, increasing the population from 1,500 to over 11,000 in nine years, before the natural gas reserves waned. Today, Iola remains home to oil and gas exploration and industry production.

The Gasbags finished a distant last in the final standings after their first season of play in the Missouri Valley League. The league held no playoffs. With a record of 34-90, playing the season under managers Harry Rand, Jimmie Driscoll and Harry Meek, Iola finished 54.0 games behind the first place Nevada Lunatics in the final standings.

In 1903, Iola continued Missouri Valley League play and were known under the slightly altered "Gaslighters" nickname for one season. The same eight teams remained in the league from the previous season, beginning league play on May 15, 1903.

The Iola Gaslighters placed third in the 1903 Missouri Valley League standings. The Coal Diggers ended the 1903 season with a record of 79–52 as A.H. Harris served as manager. After Nevada and Leavenworth folded during the season, Iola placed third of the six remaining teams, ending the season 6.0 games behind the 1st place Sedalia Goldbugs, who finished with a record of 86–47.

The Iola "Gasbags" played a final Missouri Valley League season in 1904, winning the league championship as the league became a Class C level League with eight teams. Iola ended the season with a record of 83–41, placing first in the standings, with manager Dud Risley leading the team to the championship. Iola finished 5.5 games ahead of the second place Springfield Midgets.

Despite winning the championship the previous season, the Iola franchise did not return to the 1905 Missouri Valley League. The league reformed, as only the Pittsburg and Fort Scott franchises were retained in the league. The Missouri Valley League then permanently folded after completing the 1905 season.

After the Missouri Valley League folded following the 1905 season, Iola joined the Class D level Kansas State League in 1906, with the franchise relocating during the season. The Iola "Grays" joined the Bartlesville Indians, Chanute Browns, Coffeyville Bricks, Fort Scott Giants, Independence Coyotes, Parsons Preachers and Pittsburg Champs in beginning league play on May 3, 1906.

On June 15, 1906, the Iola Grays moved to Cherryvale, Kansas to become the Cherryvale Boosters, with the team ending the Kansas League season in second place. The Iola/Cherryvale team of the Kansas State League ended their 1906 season with a record of 62–50, as Dan Durand, Fred Hobart and Billy Burns served as managers covering in both locations. The Kansas State League did not return to play in 1907.

Iola next hosted the 1908 Iola Champs, who played the season as members of the Oklahoma–Kansas League.

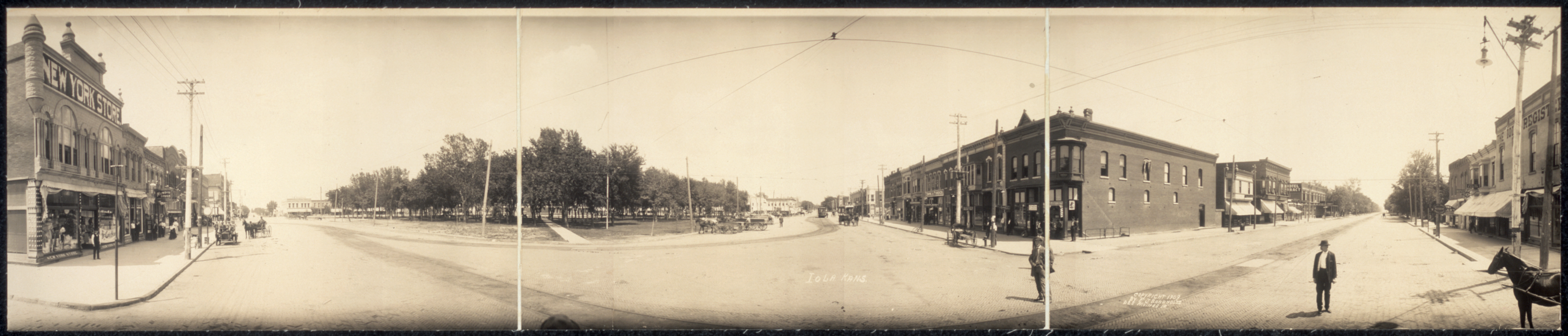
(1909) Downtown. Iola, Kansas

== The ballpark ==
The Iola teams hosted minor league home games at Riverside Municipal Ballpark, which lies within Riverside Park. The current ballpark was a Works Project Administration project after longtime use at the site. The ballpark and adjacent park grounds are still in use today. The ballpark with a track and stands is utilized by Iola's USD 257 school district sports teams. The park is located at 418 Park Avenue and South State Street in Iola.

== Timeline ==
Year(s)	# Yrs.	Team	Level	League	Ballpark
1902	1	Iola Gasbags	Class D	Missouri Valley League	Riverside Park
1903	1	Iola Gaslighters	Class D	Missouri Valley League	Riverside Park
1904	1	Iola Gasbags	Class C	Missouri Valley League	Riverside Park
1906(1)	1	Iola Champs	Class D	Kansas State League	Riverside Park
1906 (2)	1	Cherryvale Boosters	Class D	Kansas State League	Unknown

== Year–by–year records ==
Year	Record	Finish	Manager	Playoffs/Notes
1902	34–90	8th	Harry Rand / Jimmie Driscoll; Harry Meek	No playoffs held
1903	79–52	3rd	A.H. Harris	No playoffs held
1904	83–41	1st	Dud Risley	League champions
1906	62–50	2nd	Dan Durand / Fred Hobart; Billy Burns	Iola moved to Coffeyville June 15

== Notable alumni ==
- George Gillpatrick (1902)
- Roy Hartzell (1902)
- Gus Hetling (1903)
- Jack Killilay (1906)
- Larry Milton (1904)

== See also ==
- Iola Gasbags players
- Iola Grays players
