= Pittsburg Coal Diggers =

- 1903–1906; Pittsburg, Kansas

Minor league affiliations
- Class: Class D (1903); Class C (1904–1905); Class D (1906)
- League: Missouri Valley League (1903–1905); Kansas State League (1906)

Major league affiliations
- Team: None

Minor league titles
- League titles (1): 1905

Team data
- Name: Pittsburg Coal Diggers (1903–1904); Pittsburg Miners (1905); Pittsburg Champs (1906)
- Ballpark: League Park (1903–1906)

The Pittsburg Coal Diggers were a minor league baseball team based in Pittsburg, Kansas. From 1903 to 1906, Pittsburg teams played as a member of the Missouri Valley League from 1903 to 1905 before joining the 1906 Kansas State League. The Pittsburg "Miners" won the 1905 Missouri State League championship in the final season of league, before adopting the Pittsburg "Champs" nickname for the 1906 Kansas State League season.

The Pittsburg teams hosted minor league home games at League Park, which no longer exists.

== History ==
Preceding the Coal Diggers, the "Pittsburg" team played as members of the 1891 Southwest League.

The 1903 Pittsburg Coal Diggers became members of the eight–team Class D level Missouri Valley League. The Coal Diggers joined the Fort Scott Giants, Iola Gaslighters, Joplin Miners, Leavenworth White Sox, Nevada Lunatics, Sedalia Gold Bugs and Springfield Midgets in beginning league play on May 15, 1903.

In their first season of play, the Pittsburg Coal Diggers placed 6th in the Missouri Valley League standings. The Coal Diggers ended the 1903 season with a record of 39–95 as Claude East served as manager. After Nevada and Leavenworth folded during the season, Pittsburgh finished last, ending the season 47.5 games behind the 1st place Sedalia Goldbugs, who finished with a record of 86–47.

The Pittsburg Coal Diggers continued Missouri Valley League play in 1904, as the league became a Class C level League with eight teams. Pittsburg ended the season with a record of 57–64, placing fifth in the standings. O.H. Baldwin and John Kane served as managers. The Coal Diggers finished 24.5 behind the first place Iola Gasbags.

The Pittsburg "Miners" won the championship in the final season of the Missouri Valley League. With a record of 75–26, the Miners finished 14.0 games ahead of the second place Parsons Preachers, in placing first. The returning O.H. Baldwin served as manager. The Muskogee Reds disbanded on August 31, causing the Missouri Valley League to end play on September 5, 1905.

After the Missouri Valley League folded, Pittsburg joined the Class D level Kansas State League in 1906, with the franchise relocating during the season. The Pittsburg "Champs" joined the Bartlesville Indians, Chanute Browns, Coffeyville Bricks, Fort Scott Giants, Independence Coyotes, Iola Grays and Parsons Preachers in beginning league play on May 3, 1906.

On June 6, 1906, the Pittsburg Champs moved to Vinita, Oklahoma with a record of 16–15. On July 6, 1906, Vinita folded. The Pittsburg Champs/Vinita of the Kansas State League ended their 1906 season with a record of 30–25, as Henry Bartley served as manager in both locations.

Pittsburg next hosted the 1909 Pittsburg Pirates, who played the season as members of the Western Association.

== Ballpark ==
The Pittsburg teams from 1903 to 1906 played home minor league games at League Park. The ballpark was built for the 1903 minor league season. League Park was located on along the electric streetcar line of the era, on North Prospect between 28th Street and 30th Street in Pittsburg, Kansas.

== Timeline ==
Year(s)	# Yrs.	Team	Level	League	Ballpark
1903	1	Pittsburg Coal Diggers	Class D	Missouri Valley League	League Park
1904	1	Pittsburg Coal Diggers	Class C	Missouri Valley League	League Park
1905	1	Pittsburg Miners	Class C	Missouri Valley League	League Park
1906	1	Pittsburg Champs	Class D	Kansas State League	League Park

== Year–by–year record ==
Year	Record	Finish	Manager	Playoffs/Notes
1903	39–95	6th	Claude East	No playoffs held
1904	57–64	5th	O. H. Baldwin / John Kane	No playoffs held
1905	75–26	1st	O.H. Baldwin	League champions
1906	30–25	NA	Henry Bartley	Pittsburg (16–15) moved to Vinita June 5 Vinita folded July 6

== Notable alumni ==
- Rudy Baerwald (1904)
- Rudy Bell (1904)
- Chick Brandom (1906)
- Walter East (1903)
- John Halla (1903–1904)
- Tom Hughes (1904)
- John Kane (1903), (1904, MGR)
- Bill Yohe (1905)
- Harley Young (1903, 1905–1906)

== See also ==
- Pittsburg Coal Diggers players
- Pittsburg Miners players
