= Cherryvale Boosters =

- 1906; Cherryvale, Kansas

Minor league affiliations
- Class: Class D (1906)
- League: Kansas State League (1906)

Major league affiliations
- Team: None

Minor league titles
- League titles (0): None

Team data
- Name: Cherryvale Boosters (1906)
- Ballpark: Unknown (1906)

The Cherryvale Boosters were a minor league baseball team based in Cherryvale, Kansas. In 1906, the Boosters played a partial season as members of the Class D level Kansas State League, finishing in second place. The Iola Grays franchise moved to Cherryvale during the Kansas State League season and the league folded following the completion of the 1906 season.

== History ==
Cherryvale, Kansas hosted minor league baseball in 1906. During the season, the Cherryvale "Boosters" became members of the Class D level Kansas State League. The Boosters joined the Bartlesville Indians, Chanute Browns, Coffeyville Bricks, Fort Scott Giants, Independence Coyotes, Parsons Preachers and Pittsburg Champs as members in the eight–team league.

Reportedly, the Cherryvale use of the "Boosters" moniker derived from fans. Upon beginning minor league play in 1906, the Cherryvale fans immediately formed a booster club to support the team.

Cherryvale gained a team during the 1906 season. On June 15, 1906, the Iola Grays of the eight–team Class D level Kansas State League moved from Iola, Kansas to Cherryvale. Iola had a 23–18 record at the time of the move. After resuming play in Cherryvale, the Iola/Cherryvale team ended the 1906 season in second place. With a 62–50 overall record, the team played the season under managers Dan Durand, Fred Hobart and Billy Burns. The Boosters finished 4.5 games behind the first place Independence Coyotes in the final standings.

The Kansas State League did not return to play in 1907. Cherryvale, Kansas has not hosted another minor league team.

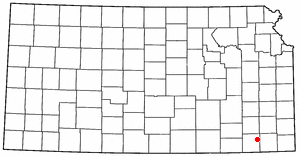
Kansas Map location. Cherryvale, Kansas

== The ballpark ==
The name of the Cherryvale Boosters' 1906 home minor league ballpark is not directly referenced.

== Year–by–year record ==
Year	Record	Finish	Manager	Playoffs/Notes
1906	62–50	2nd	Dan Durand / Fred Hobart / Billy Burns	Iola (23–18) relocated to Cherryvale June 15

== Notable alumni ==
- Jack Killilay (1906)
- Ace Stewart (1906)
- Bill Yohe (1906)

== See also ==
- Cherryvale Boosters players
