= Eureka Oilers =

- 1924–1926; (1924, 1926); Eureka, Kansas

Minor league affiliations
- Class: Class D (1924, 1926)
- League: Southwestern League (1924, 1926)

Major league affiliations
- Team: None

Minor league titles
- League titles (0): None
- Wild card berths (0): None

Team data
- Name: Eureka Oilers (1924, 1926)
- Ballpark: Fairgrounds Park (1924, 1926)

The Eureka Oilers were a minor league baseball team based in Eureka, Kansas. In 1924, the Oilers played the season as members of the Class D level Southwestern League before folding. In 1926, Eureka returned to the Southwestern League for a partial season when the Ponca City Poncans team relocated to Eureka during the season. Eureka hosted home minor league games at Fairgrounds Park.

== History ==
Minor league baseball began in Eureka, Kansas in the 1924 season, when the Eureka "Oilers" became members of the eight-team, Class D level Southwestern League. The Arkansas City Osages, Coffeyville Refiners, Emporia Traders, Enid Harvesters, Independence Producers, Newton Railroaders and Salina Millers teams joined the Oilers in beginning league play on May 1, 1924

The "Oilers" nickname corresponds to local history and industry. In 1916, the first of numerous crude oil strikes was made in the area leading to an oil production industry in the region.

At their home opener in 1924, Eureka drew 1,250 fans, hosting the game at the Fairgrounds Park.

In their first season of league play, Eureka placed fifth in the regular season standings. The Oilers finished the Southwestern League season with an overall record of 51–79 in the regular season, placing fifth overall standings. Managed by Ross Crawford and Frank Sherman, the Oilers finished 26.5 games behind the first place Newton Railroaders. The league completed the season with six teams, after the Coffeyville and Independence franchises folded during the season. In the Southwestern League Finals, the Arkansas City Osages defeated Newton in seven games for the league championship.

The Eureka Oilers did not return to play in the 1925 Southwestern League, as the league continued play as a six–team Class D level league.

In 1926, the Southwestern League member Ponca City Poncans relocated to Eureka during the final season of the six-team league. On June 22, 1926, Ponca City relocated to Eureka with an 11–33 record. After compiling an improved 38–36 record while based in Eureka, the Ponca City / Eureka team ended the season with a 49–69 overall record placing fifth in the Southwestern League regular season standings. The team finished 27.5 games behind the first place Salina Millers, who eventually won the league playoff against the Enid Boosters. Ponca City/Eureka was managed by Tiny Simmons, Cal Stewart and Bob Brown.

The Southwestern League permanently folded after the conclusion of the 1926 season. Eureka has not hosted another minor league team.

== The ballparks ==
The Eureka Oilers hosted home minor league home games at Fairgrounds Park. Fairgrounds Park was at the old fairgrounds, with a new grandstand built for the Oilers at ballpark, located in Eureka. The team hosted "Ladies' Day" on Saturdays and played scheduled home games on Sundays. Today, the Greenwood County Fair is still held annually at the Fairgrounds in Eureka.

== Timeline ==
Year(s)	# Yrs.	Team	Level	League	Ballpark
1924, 1926	2	Eureka Oilers	Class D	Southwestern League	Fairgrounds Park

== Season–by–season ==
Year	Record	Manager(s)	Finish	Playoffs/Notes
1924	51–75	Ross Crawford / Frank Sherman	5th	Did not qualify
1926	49–69	Tiny Simmons / Cal Stewart; Bob Brown	5th	Ponca City (11-33) moved to Eureka June 22; Did not qualify

== Notable alumni ==
- Emmett Bowles (1924)
- Bob Brown (1926, MGR)

== See also ==
Eureka Oilers players
