= Kansas State League =

Defunct minor league baseball league

- Classification: Independent (1887, 1895–1898); Class D (1905–1906, 1909–1911, 1913–1914)
- Sport: Minor League Baseball
- First season: 1887
- Folded: 1914
- Replaced by: Central Kansas League
- President: Walden (1887); Harry T. Mote (1895); W.H. Thompson (1896); George T. Tremble (1905); Edward Bero, Jr. (1906); P. H. Hostutler (1909–1910); C. A. Case (1911); Roy C. Gafford (1911, 1913–1914)
- No. of teams: 42
- Country: United States of America
- Most titles: 2 Great Bend Millers (1911, 1913); Independence/Independence Coyotes (1896, 1906)
- Related competitions: Oklahoma-Kansas League

The Kansas State League was a minor league baseball league in the United States that intermittently operated in the state of Kansas in the late 19th century and into the early 20th century.

== History ==
The Kansas State League was first established in 1887 as a Minor League Baseball "no classification" league and existed for that year only.

The league continued again and played in 1895 to 1896 as a "no classification" league.

Progressing into the 20th century, the circuit played in 1905–1906 as a class D league and this stint lasted two years.

The last segment of the league operated as a class D league from 1909 to 1911, and 1913–1914. The original Kansas State League ceased operation in 1911, merged with the Central Kansas League, and the 1912 season was played under the CKL name. In 1913, the CKL switched back to the Kansas State League name. After the 1914 season the league permanently disbanded.

== Cities represented ==
- Arkansas City, Kansas: Arkansas City (1887); Arkansas City Grays (1910)
- Arkansas City, Kansas & Winfield, Kansas: Arkansas City-Winfield Twins (1909)
- Atchison, Kansas: Atchison Huskers (1897–1898)
- Bartlesville, Oklahoma: Bartlesville Indians (1906)
- Chanute, Kansas: Chanute (1896); Chanute Browns (1906)
- Cherryvale, Kansas: Cherryvale Boosters (1906)
- Clay Center, Kansas: Clay Center Colts (1913)
- Coffeyville, Kansas: Coffeyville (1896); Coffeyville Bricks (1906)
- El Dorado, Kansas: El Dorado Crushers (1911)
- Ellsworth, Kansas: Ellsworth (1905); Emporia Bidwells (1914)
- Emporia, Kansas: Emporia Reds (1887); Emporia Maroons (1895, 1897)
- Fort Scott, Kansas: Fort Scott Giants (1906)
- Great Bend, Kansas: Great Bend Millers (1905, 1909–1911, 1913–1914)
- Hoisington, Kansas: Hoisington (1905)
- Hutchinson, Kansas: Hutchinson Salt Miners (1905); Hutchinson Salt Packers (1909–1911); Hutchinson Packers (1914)
- Independence, Kansas: Independence (1896); Independence Coyotes (1906)
- Iola, Kansas: Iola Grays (1906)
- Joplin, Missouri: Joplin (1887)
- Junction City, Kansas: Junction City Parrots (1897); Junction City Soldiers (1913)
- Kingman, Kansas: Kingman (1905)
- Larned, Kansas: Larned Cowboys (1909); Larned Wheat Kings (1910–1911)
- Leavenworth, Kansas: Leavenworth Soldiers (1895)
- Lincoln Center, Kansas: Lincoln Center (1905)
- Lyons, Kansas: Lyons Lions (1909–1911, 1913)
- Manhattan, Kansas: Manhattan Elks (1913)
- McPherson, Kansas: McPherson Merry Macks (1909–1911)
- Minneapolis, Kansas: Minneapolis Minnies (1905)
- Newton, Kansas: Newton Railroaders (1909–1911)
- Ottawa, Kansas: Ottawa (1898)
- Parsons, Kansas: Parsons Parsons (1896); Parsons Preachers (1906)
- Pittsburg, Kansas: Pittsburg Champs (1906)
- Salina, Kansas: Salina Blues (1898); Salina Insurgents (1913); Salina Coyotes (1914)
- Strong City, Kansas & Cottonwood Falls, Kansas: Strong City-Cottonwood Falls Twin Cities (1909)
- Topeka, Kansas: Topeka Giants (1895, 1898); Topeka Colts (1897)
- Troy, Kansas: Troy Browns (1895)
- Vinita, Oklahoma: Vinita (1906)
- Webb City, Missouri: Webb City (1887)
- Wellington, Kansas: Wellington Browns (1887); Wellington Dukes (1909–1911)
- Whiting, Kansas & Horton, Kansas: Whiting-Horton (1895)
- Wichita, Kansas: Wichita Braves (1887); Wichita Blues 1898
- Winfield, Kansas: Winfield (1887)

== League overview ==
Year	Champion	Teams	Classification	League President	Notes
1887	Wellington Browns	6	Independent	Walden	
1895	Troy Browns	4	Independent	Harry T. Mote	
1896	Independence	4	Independent	W.H. Thompson	
1905	Ellsworth	6	D	George T. Tremble	
1906	Independence Coyotes	8	D	Edward Bero Jr.	League restarted July 6
1909	Lyons Lions	8	D	P. H. Hostutler	
1910	Hutchinson Salt Packers	8	D	P. H. Hostutler	
1911	Great Bend Millers	8	D	C. A. Case / Roy C. Gafford	League disbanded on July 11
1913	Great Bend Millers	6	D	Roy C. Gafford	
1914	Emporia Bidwells	4	D	Roy C. Gafford	

== Standings & statistics ==
1887 Kansas State League

League standings
Team standings	W	L	PCT	GB	Managers
Wellington Browns	20	15	.571	–	Jack Pettiford
Arkansas City	19	20	.487	3	W.F. Wingate/ Billy Hunter / Luke Short
Emporia Reds	17	25	.405	6½	Downing
Wichita Braves	19	12	.613	NA	George Mold
Joplin	1	4	.200	NA	Davis Bailor
Webb City	0	2	.000	NA	James Ellis

Wichita moved to Western League July 21; Joplin entered July 26, disbanded August 4; Webb City entered July 28, disbanded August 4; Winfield entered July 6, disbanded July 15.
League folded August 8

Player statistics
Player	Team	Stat	Tot	Player	Team	Stat	Tot
Ducky Hemp	Wichita	BA	.389	George Haddock	Emporia	W	8
Gibbs	Emporia	Runs	31	Jack Pettiford	Wellington	W	8
Bright	Emporia	Hits	53	Walter Baldwin	Wichita	PCT	.800 4–1
Gibbs	Emporia	HR	6				

1895 Kansas State League

League standings
Team standings	W	L	PCT	GB	Managers
Troy Browns	19	14	.576	–	W.F. Johnson / Bill Devereux
Emporia Maroons	16	15	.516	2	J.R. Soden
Topeka Giants	16	16	.500	2½	Harry Mote
Leavenworth Soldiers / Whiting-Horton	12	18	.400	5½	F.W. Gassman / Logan

Leavenworth (7–10) suspended July 22 moved to Whiting-Horton

1896 Kansas State League

League standings
Team standings	W	L	PCT	GB	Managers
Independence	16	8	.667	–	J.W. Farleigh
Coffeyville	12	11	.522	3½	Foster
Parsons Parsons	9	11	.450	5	NA
Chanute	10	17	.370	7½	George Reese

Parsons disbanded August 10; League folded August 20

1905 Kansas State League

League standings
Team standings	W	L	PCT	GB	Managers
Ellsworth	34	15	.694	–	N/A
Great Bend Millers	19	9	.679	4½	Carl Moore
Minneapolis Minnies	24	22	.522	8½	Roy Gafford
Hutchinson Salt Miners	22	24	.478	10½	Cook / Fred Abbott
Lincoln Center	11	19	.375	13½	Simpson
Kingman/Hoisington	13	34	.276	20	N/A

Lincoln Center and Great Bend joined July 6; Kingman disbanded July 22; Hoisington took Kingman's place July 24.

Player statistics
Statistic	Player	Team	Number
Wins	Jones	Ellsworth	10
Wins	Cy Mason	Hutchinson Salt Miners	10
Wins	Arthur Relihan	Ellsworth	10
Winning percentage	Jones	Ellsworth	.909 (10–1)
Complete games	Cy Mason	Hutchinson Salt Miners	15
Shutouts	Jones	Ellsworth	5

Two No–Hitters were thrown in 1905. One by Lefty Holmes of Great Bend, and the other by Salter of Minneapolis.

1906 Kansas State League

League standings
Team standings	W	L	PCT	GB	Managers
Independence Coyotes	69	48	.590	–	Charles McLin / Crutcher / John Hendley
Iola Grays/Cherryvale Boosters	62	50	.554	4½	William Burns
Parsons Preachers	60	50	.545	5½	C. Pinkerton / P.P. Duffy / B.L. Taft
Coffeyville Bricks	58	50	.537	6½	Ed Mahley / Harry Barndollar/ Haisman / Finney
Bartlesville Indians	51	64	.443	17	Gus Albert
Chanute Browns	31	82	.274	36	A. Allen
Fort Scott Giants	35	18	.660	NA	M. McDonald
Pittsburg Champs/ Vinita	30	25	.545	NA	H. Bartley / William Burns

Pittsburg moved to Vinita June 6; Iola moved to Cherryvale June 15; Fort Scott and Vinita disbanded July 5. League discarded all games played before July 10 and season restarted.

Player statistics
Statistic	Player	Team	Number
Batting average	Ben Haas	Independence Coyotes	.341
Hits	Ed Foster	Coffeyville Bricks	97
Runs	Wilder Gray	Coffeyville Bricks	44
Wins	Chick Brandom	Independence Coyotes	16
Strikeouts	Chick Brandom	Independence Coyotes	121
Winning percentage	Harry Womack	Coffeyville Bricks	1.000 (10–0)

1909 Kansas State League

League standings
Team standings	W	L	PCT	GB	Managers
Lyons Lions	61	37	.622	–	Cecil Bankhead
Hutchinson Salt Packers	60	37	.619	½	Bill Zink
McPherson Merry Macks	59	37	.615	1	O. P. Depew / Earl Green
Great Bend Millers	49	48	.505	11½	Rudy Kling / Stillings
Wellington Dukes	44	54	.449	17	Cy Mason / John Meade
Newton Railroaders	42	54	.438	18	Con Harlow / A. Stillwell
Arkansas City-Winfield Twins	41	56	.423	19½	M. E. Parks / Frank Layne / Bennie Owens
Strong City-Cottonwood Falls Twin Cities / Larned Cowboys	32	65	.330	28½	Butch Freese / Buck Weaver

City of Winfield, Kansas bought partial interest in Arkansas City franchise on July 22; Strong City–Cottonwood Falls moved to Larned July 12.

Player statistics
Statistic	Player	Team	Number
Batting average	Jim Miller	Newton Railroaders	.342
Home Runs	Pete LaFlambois	Arkansas City-Winfield Twins	6
Hits	Jim Miller	Newton Railroaders	119
Runs	Jasper Hainsey	McPherson Merry Macks	66
Wins	Robert Hassler	Lyons Lions	25
Strikeouts	Robert Hassler	Lyons Lions	193
Winning percentage	Pearl Stanley	Hutchinson Salt Packers	.793 (23–6)

1910 Kansas State League

League standings
Team standings	W	L	PCT	GB	Managers
Hutchinson Salt Packers	70	39	.642	–	Bill Zink
McPherson Merry Macks	58	49	.542	11	D. Conklin / F. J. Synek
Lyons Lions	57	53	.518	13½	Cecil Bankhead / Joe Riggert / Buck Ebright / John Jones
Newton Railroaders	56	54	.509	14½	Mel Backus
Great Bend Millers	54	55	.495	16	Charles Lyons
Wellington Dukes	48	56	.461	19½	C. Pinkerton / Ody Abbott / Harry Vitter / Lewis Armstrong
Larned Wheat Kings	46	56	.451	20½	Buck Weaver / Harry McLean
Arkansas City Grays	40	67	.374	29	L. Evans / Dennis McGuire / Doc Baker

Player statistics
Statistic	Player	Team	Number
Batting average	Joe Riggert	Lyons Lions	.362
Home Runs	Joe Riggert	Lyons Lions	13
Hits	Bill Zink	Hutchinson Salt Packers	141
Runs	Charles Weisner	Lyons Lions	132
Wins	E. J. Smith	Hutchinson Salt Packers	18
Wins	Walt Sizemore	Lyons Lions	18
Strikeouts	Rolla Maple	Great Bend Millers	205
Winning percentage	E. J. Smith	Hutchinson Salt Packers	.750 (18–6)

1911 Kansas State League

'League standings
Team	W	L	PCT	GB	Managers
Great Bend Millers	39	20	.661	–	Affie Wilson / Wild Bill Luhrsen
Newton Railroaders	39	21	.650	½	N/A
Lyons Lions	37	27	.578	4½	Spencer Abbott
McPherson Merry Macks	31	28	.525	8	Joseph Harris
Hutchinson Salt Packers	29	29	.500	9½	Bill Zink
Larned Wheat Kings	23	32	.418	14	Harry Berte
El Dorado Crushers	15	33	.313	18½	Bill Annis / Walter Sizemore
Wellington Dukes	15	38	.283	21	Peter Ketter / C. E. Powell / Ned Price

Wellington played 10 home games in Wichita, Kansas from June 11 to June 23.
League disbanded July 11 due to crop failures and drought. No individual statistics available.

1913 Kansas State League

League standings
Team	W	L	PCT	GB	Managers
Great Bend Millers	53	36	.596	–	Affie Wilson / William Luhrsen
Clay Center Cubs	51	37	.580	1½	Max Addington
Lyons Lions	50	39	.562	3	William Nelson
Salina Insurgents	26	63	.292	27	Lon Ury / Mike Welday
Manhattan Elks	27	24	.529	N/A	Fred Moore
Junction City Soldiers	21	29	.420	N/A	Norm Price / Cecil Bankhead

After Junction City disbanded July 9; League folded Manhattan July 10.

Player statistics
Statistic	Player	Team	Number
Batting average	John Singleton	Clay Center Cubs	.335
Hits	John Singleton	Clay Center Cubs	133
Runs	John Singleton	Clay Center Cubs	78
Wins	J. L. O'Byrne	Lyons Lions	17
Winning percentage	C. H. Riley	Great Bend Millers	1.000 (9–0)

1914 Kansas State League

League standings
Team	W	L	GB	Managers
Emporia Bidwells	54	32	–	Ira Bidwell
Salina Coyotes	47	41	8	Dick Robin
Hutchinson Packers	40	49	15½	Jesse Clifton
Great Bend Millers	35	54	20½	Affie Wilson

Player statistics
Stat	Player	Team	Number
Batting average	Pete LaFlambois	Emporia Bidwells	.342
Hits	Rick Freeman	Hutchinson Packers	98
Wins	Otis Lambeth; Ralph Shimeal	Emporia Bidwells; Emporia Bidwells	14
Runs	Paul Turgeon	Emporia Bidwells	61
Strikeouts	Powell Burnett	Salina Coyotes	166
Winning percentage	Otis Lambeth	Emporia Bidwells	.737 (14–5)

== Sources ==
- Encyclopedia of Minor League Baseball (1997, second edition), edited by W. Lloyd Johnson]and Miles Wolff
