= Arthur Rueber =

American football and baseball player and coach

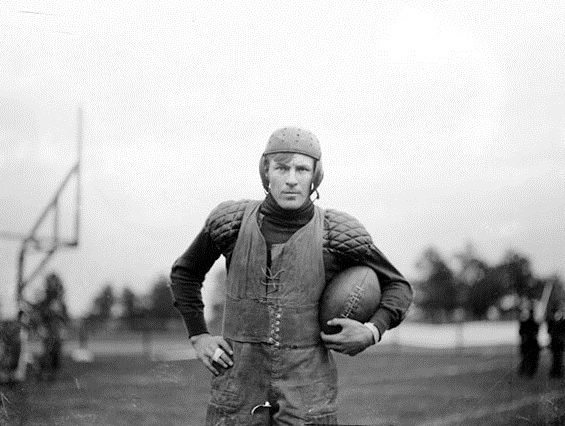
- Rueber playing for Northwestern in 1905

Biographical details
- Born: August 9, 1883; Minnesota, U.S.
- Died: September 1, 1968 (aged 85); Olmsted County, Minnesota, U.S.

Playing career

Football
- 1903–1905: Northwestern

Baseball
- c. 1905: Northwestern
- 1906: Bartlesville Indians
- 1906: Chanute Browns
- Positions: Halfback (football); Pitcher (baseball)

Coaching career (HC unless noted)

Football
- 1906: Grant
- 1907–1908: Whitworth
- 1909–1912: North Dakota Agricultural

Baseball
- 1909–1913: North Dakota Agricultural

Basketball
- 1909–1913: North Dakota Agricultural

Administrative career (AD unless noted)
- 1909–1913: North Dakota Agricultural

Head coaching record
- Overall: 22–13–1 (football); 12–7–1 (basketball); 35–17 (baseball)

Charles Arthur Rueber (August 9, 1883 – September 1, 1968; sometimes spelled Reuber) was an American football and baseball player, coach of football, basketball, and baseball, and college athletics administrator.

== Playing career ==
Rueber was a starting halfback at Northwestern University in 1905.

He also spent one summer playing minor league baseball for the Bartlesville Indians and Chanute Browns of the Kansas State League in 1906.

== Coaching career ==
Rueber served as the head football coach at U.S. Grant Memorial University—now known as the University of Tennessee at Chattanooga–in 1906, Whitworth University in Spokane, Washington from 1907 to 1908, and the North Dakota Agricultural School—now known as North Dakota State University—from 1909 to 1912. At North Dakota Agricultural, he was also the head baseball coach from 1909 to 1913.

== Head coaching record ==
=== Football ===
Year	Team	Overall	Conference	Standing	Bowl/playoffs
Grant (Independent) (1906)
1906	Grant	3–3			
Grant:		3–3			
Whitworth (Independent) (1907–1908)
1907	Whitworth	1–2			
1908	Whitworth	6–1			
Whitworth:		7–3			
North Dakota Agricultural Aggies (Independent) (1909–1912)
1909	North Dakota Agricultural	2–2–1			
1910	North Dakota Agricultural	2–3			
1911	North Dakota Agricultural	3–1			
1912	North Dakota Agricultural	5–1			
North Dakota Agricultural:		12–7–1			
Total:		22–13–1			
