= Larned Wheat Kings =

- 1909–1911; Larned, Kansas

Minor league affiliations
- Class: Class D (1909–1911)
- League: Kansas State League (1909–1911)

Major league affiliations
- Team: None

Minor league titles
- League titles (0): None

Team data
- Name: Larned Cowboys (1909); Larned Wheat Kings (1910–1911)
- Ballpark: City Park (1909–1911)

The Larned Wheat Kings were a minor league baseball team based in Larned, Kansas. From 1909 to 1911, Larned teams played exclusively as members of the Class D level Kansas State League. The team began play known as the Larned "Cowboys" in the 1909 season. In 1911, the Kansas State League, Larned included, folded during the season due to drought. Larned hosted home minor league games at City Park.

== History ==
Minor league baseball in Larned, Kansas began during the 1909 season, when the Larned Cowboys came into existence during the season. On July 12, 1909, the Strong City-Cottonwood Falls Twin Cities team, with a 22–41 record relocated to Larned and the Cowboys became members of the reformed eight–team Class D level Kansas State League. Larned immediately joined the Arkansas City-Winfield Twins, Great Bend Millers, Hutchinson Salt Packers, Lyons Lions, McPherson Merry Macks, Newton Railroaders and Wellington Dukes teams as 1909 league members.

Completing their first season of play, the Twin Cities/Cowboys team finished in last place. After compiling a 10–24 record while based in Larned, the team finished with a 32–65 overall record to finish in eighth place. Playing under managers Harry Freese and Farmer Weaver, the Cowboys finished 28.5 games behind the first place Lyons Lions in the final Kansas State League standings.

Continuing play as members of the 1910 Kansas State League, the Larned team played under the Larned "Wheat Kings" moniker. The Larned "Wheat Kings" nickname corresponds with local agriculture production in the region. Today, the Larned region continues its history as a strong wheat producing region.

Larned finished the 1910 season with a record of 46–56 to place seventh under returning manager Farmer Weaver and Harry McLear. Weaver resigned as manager with the team on an 11–game losing streak and a record of 15–25 at the time of his departure. The Wheat Kings finished 20.5 games behind the first place Hutchinson Salt Packers in the final 1910 standings.

On August 19, 1910, Larned pitcher Harry Watson threw a no-hitter in a 2–0 victory over the Great Bend Millers.

The 1911 Larned Wheat Kings played their final season as the Kansas League folded during the season. The Wheat Kings ended the 1911 season with a record of 23–32, after the league disbanded on July 11, 1911, due to crop failures and drought. When the league ceased play, Larned was in sixth place in the standings. Harry Berte served as manager as the Wheat Kings finished 14.0 games behind the first place Great Bend Millers in the shortened season.

After serving as an umpire in the 1911 Kansas State League, in 1912, former Larned manager Farmer Weaver was sentenced to 21 years in prison for domestic crimes. He was later released in 1914, with a former teammate serving as his parole clerk.

After the Kansas State League folded following the 1911 season, the league did not play in 1912 and resumed play in 1913 without a Larned franchise. Larned, Kansas has not hosted another minor league team.

== The ballparks ==
The Larned minor league teams played home games at the City Park in Larned. In the era of Sunday laws it was noted that Sunday baseball was allowed to be played in Larned, Kansas.

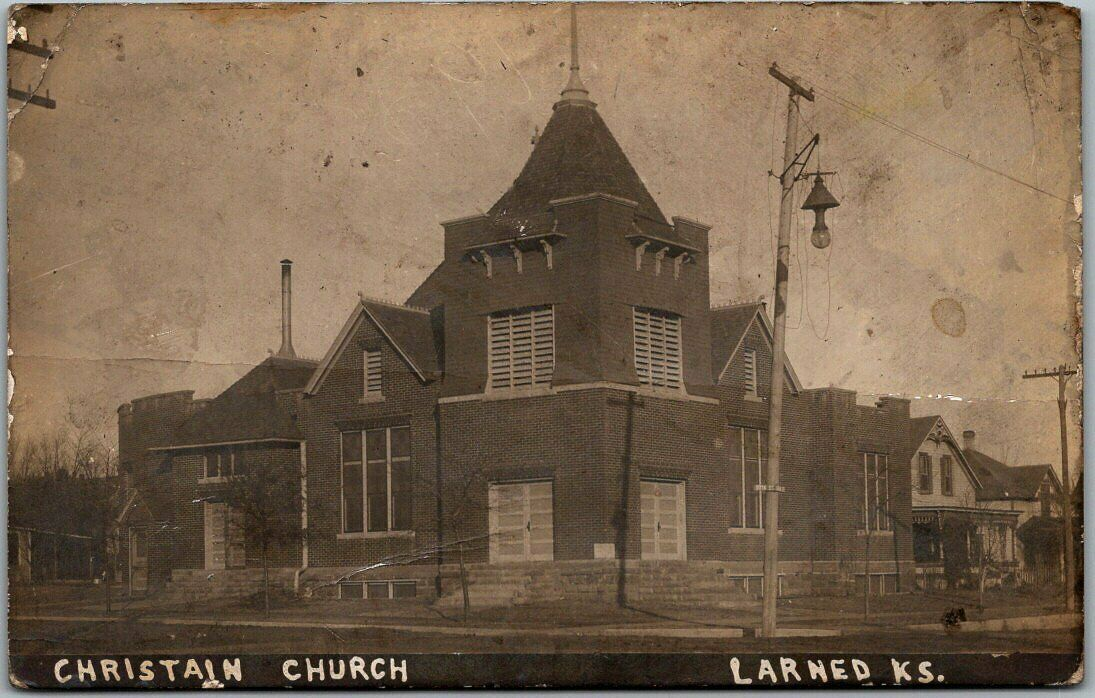
Larned KS - March 10, 1914

== Timeline ==
Year(s)	# Yrs.	Team	Level	League	Ballpark
1909	1	Larned Cowboys	Class D	Kansas State League	City Park
1910–1911	2	Larned Wheat Kings	Class D	Kansas State League	City Park

== Year–by–year records ==
Year	Record	Finish	Manager	Playoffs/Notes
1909	32–65	8th	Butch Freese / Farmer Weaver	Strong City-Cottonwood moved to Larned July 12; 10–24 record in Larned
1910	46–56	7th	Farmer Weaver (15–25) / Harry McLear (31-31)	No playoffs held
1911	23–32	6th	Harry Berte	League folded July 11

== Notable alumni ==
- Lee Dressen (1910)
- Walt Thomas (1910)
- Farmer Weaver (1909–1910, MGR)

== See also ==
- Larned Cowboys players
- Larned Wheat Kings players
