= Troy Browns =

- 1895; Troy, Kansas

Minor league affiliations
- Class: Independent (1895)
- League: Kansas State League (1895)

Major league affiliations
- Team: None

Minor league titles
- League titles (1): 1895

Team data
- Name: Troy Browns (1895)
- Ballpark: Unknown (1895)

The Troy Browns were a minor league baseball team based in Troy, Kansas, In 1895, the Browns played as members of the independent Kansas State League, winning the league championship in their only season of play.

== History ==
Minor league baseball in Troy, Kansas began during the 1895 season, when the Troy "Browns" played as members of the four–team Independent level Kansas State League. The Emporia Maroons, Leavenworth Soldiers and Topeka Giants teams joined Troy in beginning league play on May 16, 1895.

Troy was noted to be the smallest city in the four–team league, with the team first forming in March 1895. The Browns were noted to have played exhibition games against the nearby St. Joseph Saints, losing the games by scores of 12–7, 20–18 and 9–1. It was noted that Troy, Kansas native Bert Wakefield played for the team, integrating the Troy roster. Pearce Chiles was noted to have been the captain of the team at the beginning of the season, replaced by Wakefield when Chiles was traded. Jacob Buckhart, an American Indian catcher, also was noted to have played for Troy.

It was reported in the Leavenworth newspaper that Bert Wakefield was initially denied entrance to the team hotel in Leavenworth. When manager Bill Devereaux intervened and threatened to move the team to another hotel, Wakefield was allowed to stay at the hotel with his teammates.

In 1895, the Troy Browns won the Kansas State League championship. Ending the season with a record of 19–14, the Browns finished the season in first place, playing under managers W.F. Johnson and Bill Devereux. Troy finished 2.0 games ahead of the second place Emporia Maroons (16–15) in the final standings, followed by the Topeka Giants (16–16) and Leavenworth Soldiers/Whiting-Holton in the final standings.

It was noted that after the Kansas State League finished the 1895 season early, Troy continued playing. They reportedly played a team from Winfield, Kansas.

A native of California, player/manager Bill "Brick" Devereux reportedly refused to play baseball for teams in the "East" again after playing for Troy. Devereaux was noted to have played the rest of his professional career for teams in California, spanning 17 seasons.

Despite their championship, the Troy franchise did not return to the 1896 league play. Troy, Kansas has not hosted another minor league team.

== The ballparks ==
The name of the 1895 Troy Browns home minor league park is unknown.

== Year–by–year record ==
Year	Record	Finish	Manager	Playoffs/Notes
1895	19–14	1st	W.F. Johnson / Bill Devereux	League champions

== Notable alumni ==
- Pearce Chiles (1895)
- Bert Wakefield (1895)
- Troy Browns players
