= Atchison Huskers =

- 1897–1898; Atchison, Kansas

Minor league affiliations
- Class: Class D (1897–1898)
- League: Kansas State League (1897–1898)

Major league affiliations
- Team: None

Minor league titles
- League titles (1): 1897

Team data
- Name: Atchison Huskers (1897–1898)
- Ballpark: Forest Park (1897–1898)

The Atchison Huskers were a minor league baseball team based in Atchison, Kansas. In 1897 and 1898, the Atchison Huskers played exclusively as members of the Class D level Kansas State League, winning the 1897 league championship. Atchison hosted minor league home games at Forest Park.

== History ==
Minor league baseball in Atchison, Kansas began during the 1897 season, when the Atchison "Huskers" became members of the four–team Class D level Kansas State League. The Emporia Maroons, Junction City Parrots and Topeka Colts teams joined Atchison in league play.

It was reported the Kansas State League formed from the "Northern Kansas League" during the 1897 season, with the Atchison Huskers franchise replacing the Minneapolis, Kansas team.

Beginning league play on June 21, 1897, Atchison ended the season as Kansas State League champions, as the league ended play on July 7, 1897. With a record of 8–3, the Huskers finished the season in first place, playing under managers Cole and Franklin Mitchell. Atchison finished 2.5 games ahead of the second place Junction City Parrots in the final standings.

In 1898, the Atchison Huskers continued play in the Kansas State League in their final season, with the league beginning play on July 24, 1898. Ending the season with a record of 4–5, playing under manager Charlie Cole, Atchison finished the season in third place, 3.5 games behind the first place Salina Blues. Ending league play on August 10, 1898, the Kansas State League folded, reportedly after Salina and Atchison both dissolved due to finances.

The Kansas State League did not return to play in 1899. Atchison, Kansas has not hosted another minor league team.

== The ballpark ==
The Atchison Huskers teams hosted minor league home games at Forest Park. Photographs from the era show Forest Park to be a public park with amenities.

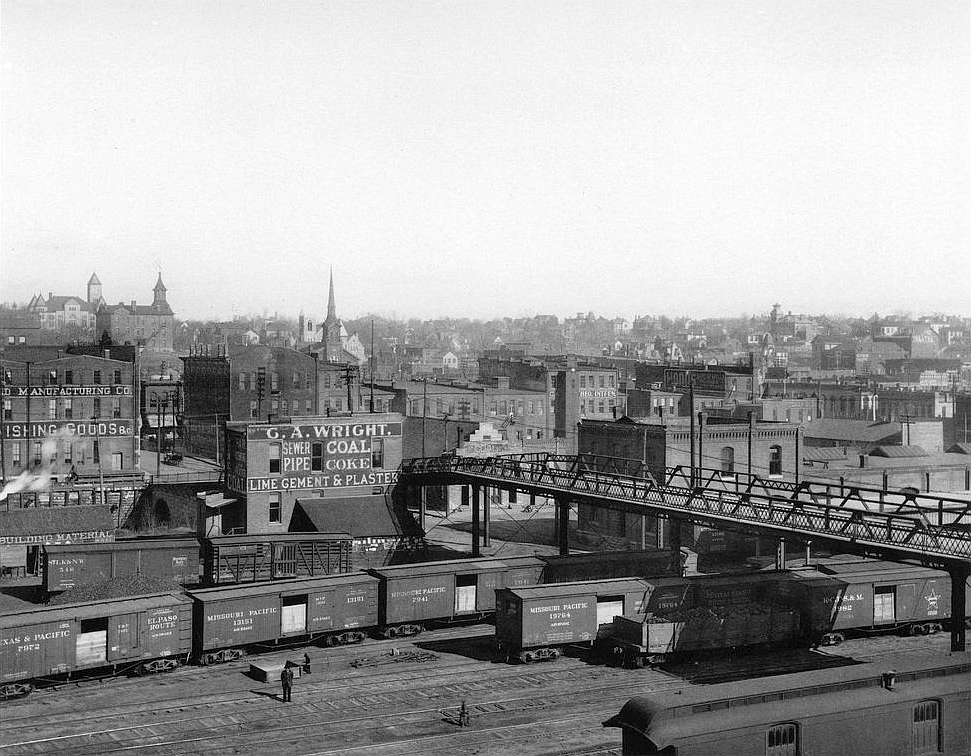
(1880-1900 ) Rail yard beneath the lower Sixth Street viaduct. Atchison, Kansas

== Timeline ==
Year(s)	# Yrs.	Team	Level	League	Ballpark
1897–1898	2	Atchison Huskers	Class D	Kansas State League	Forest Park

== Year–by–year records ==
Year	Record	Finish	Manager	Playoffs/Notes
1897	8–3	1st	Charlie Cole / Franklin Mitchell	League champions
1898	4–5	3rd	Charlie Cole	No playoffs Held

=== Notable alumni ===
- Harry Berte (1898)
- Billy Kinloch (1898)
- Fred Raymer (1898)
- Elmer Stricklett (1898)

== See also ==
Atchison Huskers players
