= Bert Wakefield =

- First baseman
- Born: May 1870; Troy, Kansas, US
- Died: Unknown
- Batted: Unknown Threw: Unknown

debut
- 1899, for the Chicago Unions

Last appearance
- 1900, for the Chicago Union Giants

Teams
- Chicago Unions (1899–1900)

Burgess "Bert" Wakefield (May 1870 - death date unknown) was an American Negro leagues first baseman and for several years before the founding of the first Negro National League.

He played for Frank Leland's traveling Chicago Unions for at least two years. There he played with Home Run Johnson, Bill Holland, and Harry Hyde.

Wakefield played for the minor league Troy Browns of the Kansas State League in the 1895 season. Troy was Wakefield's hometown.
