= Wellington Dukes (baseball) =

- 1909–1911; (1887, 1909–1911); Wellington, Kansas

Minor league affiliations
- Class: Independent (1887); Class D (1909–1911)
- League: Kansas State League (1887, 1909–1911)

Major league affiliations
- Team: None

Minor league titles
- League titles (1): 1887

Team data
- Name: Wellington Browns (1887); Wellington Dukes (1909–1911)
- Ballpark: Woods Park (1887, 1909–1911)

The Wellington Dukes were a minor league baseball team based in Wellington, Kansas. From 1909 to 1911, the "Dukes" played exclusively as members of the Kansas State League. The Dukes were preceded in Kansas State play by the 1887 Wellington "Browns," who won the league championship. Wellington hosted minor league home games at Woods Park.

== History ==
Minor league baseball in Wellington, Kansas began with the 1887 Wellington "Browns," who won a championship in a shortened season. The Browns won the league championship as charter members of the six–team Independent level Kansas State League, which reduced to four teams during the season. After beginning league play on May 17, 1887, the Kansas State League folded on August 8, 1887, with Wellington in first place on that date. Wellington compiled a 20–15 record playing under manager Jack Pettiford to finish 3.0 games ahead of the second place Arkansas City team in the final standings.

In 1909, minor league baseball returned to Wellington as the Wellington "Dukes" resumed minor league play. The Dukes became members of the reformed eight–team Class D level Kansas State League. The Arkansas City-Winfield Twins, Great Bend Millers, Hutchinson Salt Packers, Larned Cowboys, Lyons Lions, McPherson Merry Macks and Newton Railroaders teams joined Wellington as 1909 league members.

In their first season of Kansas State League play, the Wellington Dukes placed sixth in the 1909 Kansas State League final standings. Wellington finished with a 44–54 overall record to end the season to place sixth in the eight–team league. Playing under managers Cy Mason and John Meade, the Dukes finished 17.0 games behind the first place Lyons Lions in the final Kansas State League standings, as no playoffs were held.

Continuing play as members of the 1910 Kansas State League, the Wellington Dukes ending the season with a record of 48–56 to place sixth, while playing under managers C. Pinkerton, Spencer Abbott, Harry Vitter and Lewis Armstrong. The Dukes finished 19.5 games behind the first place Hutchinson Salt Packers in the final standings of the eight–team league.

On August 12, 1910, Wellington pitcher Henry Grohs threw a no-hitter in a 1–0 Dukes victory over the Larned Wheat Kings.

The 1911 Wellington Dukes played their final season and finished last in the standings, as the Kansas State League folded during the season. The Kansas State League folded on July 11, 1911. The Dukes ended the 1911 season with a record of 15–38 record, after the league disbanded on July 11, due to crop failures and drought. The Dukes were managed by Phil Ketter, C.E. Powell and Ned Price in their final season. When the league ceased play, Wellington was in eighth place in the standings, as the Dukes ended their final season finished 21.0 games behind the first place Great Bend Millers (39–20) in the shortened season.

The Kansas State League did not return to minor league play in the 1912 or 1913 seasons. The league resumed play in 1914, without a Wellington franchise. Wellington, Kansas has not hosted another minor league team.

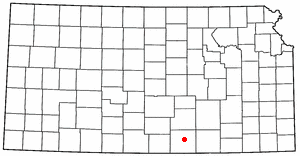
Kansas Map. Wellington, Kansas location

== The ballpark ==
The Wellington minor league teams hosted minor league home games at Woods Park. Today, Woods Park is still in use as a public park. The park is located at 1110 West 4th Street in Wellington, Kansas.

== Timeline ==
| Year(s) | # Yrs. | Team | Level | League | Ballpark |
|---|---|---|---|---|---|
| 1887 | 1 | Wellington Browns | Independent | Kansas State League | Woods Park |
| 1909–1911 | 3 | Wellington Dukes | Class D | Kansas State League | Woods Park |

== Year–by–year records ==
| Year | Record | Finish | Manager | Playoffs/Notes |
|---|---|---|---|---|
| 1887 | 20–15 | 1st | Jack Pettiford | League champions League folded August 8 |
| 1909 | 44–54 | 5th | Cy Mason / John Meade | No playoffs held |
| 1910 | 48–56 | 6th | C. Pinkerton / Spencer Abbott / Harry Vitter / Lewis Armstrong | No playoffs held |
| 1911 | 15–38 | 8th | Phil Ketter / C.E. Powell / Ned Price | League folded July 11 |

== Notable alumni ==
- Spencer Abbott (1910, MGR)
- Phil Ketter (1911, MGR)
