= Emporia, Kansas minor league baseball history =

Emporia, Kansas minor league teams
- 1887–1924; (1887, 1895, 1914, 1924); Emporia, Kansas

Minor league affiliations
- Class: Independent (1887); Class D (1895, 1914, 1924)
- League: Western League (1887); Kansas State League (1887, 1895, 1914); Southwestern League (1924)

Major league affiliations
- Team: None

Minor league titles
- League titles (1): 1914

Team data
- Name: Emporia (1887); Emporia Reds (1887); Emporia Maroons (1895); Emporia Bidwells (1914); Emporia Traders (1924)
- Ballpark: Athletic Park (1895); Soden's Grove (1914); Logan Park (1924)

Minor league baseball teams were based in Emporia, Kansas between 1887 and 1924 in four separate seasons. Emporia teams played as members of the Western League in 1887, Kansas State League in 1887, 1895 and 1914 and Southwestern League in 1924.

== History ==
Minor league baseball in Emporia, Kansas began during the 1887 season, as Emporia teams played in two leagues.

The Emporia Reds began play in tow leagues, First, the Reds began the season as members of the 1887 four–team Independent level Kansas State League, which expanded to six teams before folding. On August 8, 1887, Emporia had a record of 17–25 when the league folded. The Reds were in third place, playing under manager Downing when the league folded. Emporia finished 6.5 games behind the first place Wellington Browns in the final standings.

The Emporia team continued in 1887 and played briefly as members of the ten–team Independent level Western League. Joining the league during the season, Emporia had a 6–12 record under manager Benjamin F. Sullivan when the team folded on September 9, 1887.

In 1895, Emporia resumed minor league play, when the Emporia Maroons played as members of the four–team Class D level Kansas State League. Ending the season with a record of 16–15, the Maroons finished the season in second place, playing the season under manager J.R. Soden. Emporia finished 2.0 games behind the first place Troy Browns in the final standings. George Haddock of Emporia led the Kansas State League with 8 wins. The Emporia franchise did not return to the 1896 Kansas State League.

In 1914, the Emporia Bidwells resumed play reformed four–team Class D level Kansas State League. Emporia joined the Great Bend Millers, Hutchinson Salt Packers and Salina Coyotes as 1914 league members. Named after their manager the 1914, Bidwells won the League championship. Beginning league play on May 14, 1914, Emporia finished the season with a record of 54–32, placing first in the final standings, playing under manager and namesake Ira Bidwell. The Emporia Bidwells finished 6.0 games ahead of the second place Salina Coyotes in the final standings. Pete LaFlambois of the Emporia Bidwells led the league in batting average, hitting .342, while teammates Otis Lambeth and Ralph Shimeal led the league with 14 wins. The Kansas State League permanently folded following the 1914 season.

Playing as members of the 1924 eight-team Class D level Southwestern League, the Emporia "Traders" played the final minor league season in Emporia. The Emporia Traders ended the season with a record of 40–89 to place sixth in the final standings. Playing under managers Tom Mason, Hunky Shaw, Pat Mason and Ole Olson, Emporia finished 39.0 games behind the first place Newton Railroaders in the final Southwestern League standings. The Emporia franchise did not return to play in the 1925 Southwestern League.

The Emporia franchise did not return to play in the 1925 Southwestern League. Emporia, Kansas has not hosted another minor league team.

== The ballparks ==
The 1895 Emporia Maroons reportedly hosted minor league home games at Athletic Park. Today, Athletic Park is still in use as a public park, containing the Kelsch Ball Park and Fischler Field. The park is located at 700 West 1st Street, Emporia, Kansas.

In 1914, the Emporia Bidwells played minor league home games at Soden's Grove. Reference indicates the ballpark was built in 1914 by the Emporia Amusement Company and designed by Mit Wilhite, with the site adjacent to the fairgrounds. The ballpark reportedly had a clay infield and on-deck circles, with a 64-foot grandstand and 102-foot-long Left field bleachers. The ballpark was reportedly built for $750. Today, the Sodens Grove Ball Field is still in use as a public baseball field, hosting Emporia High School games and other youth baseball. The location is noted to be 1000 South Commercial Street, Emporia, Kansas.

The 1924 Emporia Traders minor league team hosted minor league home games at Logan Park. Reportedly, cattle were allowed to graze on the outfield grass. The ballpark was located at Congress Street & Logan Street, Emporia, Kansas.

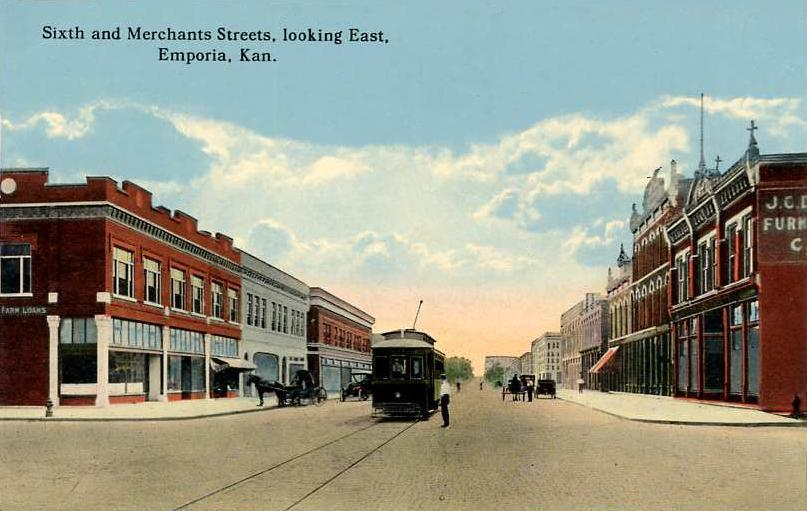
(1912) Sixth Avenue and Merchant Street. Emporia, Kansas

== Timeline ==
Year(s)	# Yrs.	Team	Level	League	Ballpark
1887(1)	1	Emporia	Independent	Western League	Unknown
1887(2)	1	Emporia Reds	Class D	Kansas State League	Unknown
1895	1	Emporia Maroons	Class D	Kansas State League	Athletic Park
1914	1	Emporia Bidwells	Class D	Kansas State League	Sodens Grove Ball Field
1924	1	Emporia Traders	Class D	Southwestern League	Logan Park

== Year–by–year records ==
Year	Record	Finish	Manager	Playoffs/Notes
1887(1)	17–25	3rd	Downing	League folded August 8
1887(2)	6–12	NA	Benjamin F. Sullivan	Team folded September 9
1895	16–15	2nd	J.R. Soden	No playoffs Held
1914	54–32	1st	Ira Bidwell	League champions
1924	40–89	6th	Tom Mason / Hunky Shaw; Pat Mason / Ole Olson	Did not qualify

== Notable alumni ==
- George Haddock (1997, 1895)
- Otis Lambeth (1914)
- Charlie Levis (1887)
- Emil Liston (1914)
- Herman Long (1887) Braves Hall of Fame
- John McCarty (1887)
- Dad Meek (1887)
- Tim O'Rourke (1887)
- Harry Raymond (1887)
- Hunky Shaw (1924, MGR)
- Jack Wentz (1887)

== See also ==
- Emporia Reds players
- Emporia Bidwells players
