= Hoisington (baseball) =

- 1905; Hoisington, Kansas

Minor league affiliations
- Class: Class D (1905)
- League: Kansas State League (1905)

Major league affiliations
- Team: None

Minor league titles
- League titles (0): None

Team data
- Name: Kingman (1905); Hoisington (1905)
- Ballpark: Hoisington Base Ball Park (1905)

The Hoisington team was a minor league baseball team briefly based in Hoisington, Kansas. In 1905, the Hoisington team played as members of the Class D level Kansas State League, hosting home games at the Hoisington Base Ball Park. Hoisington began play after the Kingman team folded from the league.

== History ==
Hoisington, Kansas first hosted minor league baseball during the 1905 season. After beginning league play on June 15, 1905, as charter members of the six–team Class D level Kansas State League, the Kingman, Kansas folded on July 22, 1905. On July 22, 1905, the "Hoisington" team replaced Kingman and began Kansas State League play.

Beginning play in the charter season of the Class D level league, the Kingman/Hoisington team finished last. Ending the season with an overall record of 13–34 record, Kingman/Hoisington played under managers Ernie Quigley, Arthur DeWeese and Valerius. In the six–team league, the Kingman/Hoisington team placed sixth th and finished 20.0 games behind the 1st place Ellsworth team in the final Kansas State League standings. Ellsworth ended the season with a record 34–15 to finish in 1st place when the league ended play on August 8, 1905. Following in the standings were the Minneapolis Minnies, (24–22), Hutchinson Salt Miners (22–24), Lincoln Center (11–19) and Kingman/Hoisington (13–34). The Hoisington franchise folded following the 1905 season and did not return to the 1906 Kansas State League.

Hoisington, Kansas has not hosted another minor league team.

== The ballpark ==
The 1905 Hoisington team hosted home minor league games at the Hoisington Base Ball Park. The ballpark was located at South Clay & South Center at West 1st & West 2nd Streets. The streets today correspond to the site of "Heritage Park," noted to be the "original" public park in Hoisington. Heritate Park is still in use as a public park. The location is 500 West 1st Street Hoisington, Kansas.

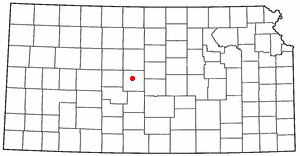
Kansas Map. Hoisington, Kansas location

== Year–by–year record ==
Year	Record	Finish	Manager	Playoffs/Notes
1905	13–34	6th	Ernie Quigley; Arthur DeWeese / Valerius	No playoffs held

== Notable alumni ==
- Larry Cheney (1905)
- Roy Wilkinson (1905)
