= Chick Brandom =

American baseball player (1887–1958)

- Pitcher
- Born: March 31, 1887; Coldwater, Kansas, U.S.
- Died: October 7, 1958 (aged 71); Santa Ana, California, U.S.
- Batted: Right Threw: Right

MLB debut
- September 3, 1908, for the Pittsburgh Pirates

Last MLB appearance
- September 7, 1915, for the Newark Peppers

MLB statistics
- Win–loss record: 3–1
- Earned run average: 2.08
- Strikeouts: 44
- Stats at Baseball Reference

Teams
- Pittsburgh Pirates (1908–1909); Newark Peppers (1915)

Chester Milton "Chick" Brandom (March 31, 1887 – October 7, 1958) was an American pitcher in Major League Baseball. He played for the Pittsburgh Pirates and Newark Peppers.

== Baseball career ==
Brandom started his professional baseball career in 1905 with the Missouri Valley League's Muskogee Reds. He went 8–11. The following season, he played for the Independence Coyotes of the Kansas State League, and in 23 games, he went 16–5 to lead the circuit in wins. In 1907, Brandom moved to the Kansas City Blues of the class A American Association; his record dropped to 6–7. He stayed with Kansas City in 1908 and was 17–13 when the National League's Pittsburgh Pirates purchased him in August for $5,000. Brandom made his major league debut on September 3, and he finished the year at 1–0 with a 0.53 earned run average in three appearances. The following season, he made 13 appearances for the Pirates and won his only decision again. Pittsburgh won the NL pennant and the World Series that year.

Brandom returned to the Kansas City Blues in 1910. That season, he went 20–15 and set career-highs in wins, games (54), and innings pitched (337). However, he slumped to 1–14 in 1911 and then went to the International League, where he won eight games in 1913 and 10 games in 1914. In 1915, Brandom made it back to the majors with the Federal League's Newark Peppers. He went 1–1 with a 3.40 ERA in 16 games. His playing career ended after the season. He was a manager of the Corpus Christi Seahawks of the Gulf Coast League in 1926.

== Personal life ==
Brandom was 5 feet, 8 inches tall and weighed 161 pounds. He had a birth defect in which his second toe overlapped his first toe, and this became painful when he threw a pitch. Brandom was born in Coldwater, Kansas, in 1887, and he died in Santa Ana, California, in 1958.
