= Joe Riggert =

American baseball player (1886–1973)

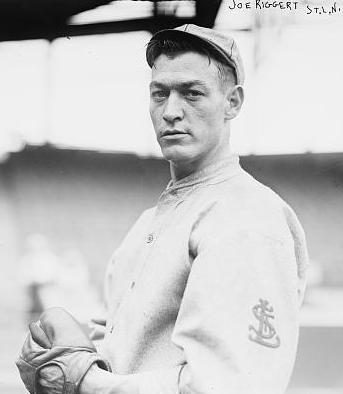
- Outfielder
- Born: December 11, 1886; Janesville, Wisconsin, U.S.
- Died: December 10, 1973 (aged 86); Kansas City, Missouri, U.S.
- Batted: Right Threw: Right

MLB debut
- April 12, 1911, for the Boston Red Sox

Last MLB appearance
- July 21, 1919, for the Boston Braves

MLB statistics
- Batting average: .240
- Home runs: 8
- Runs batted in: 44
- Stats at Baseball Reference

Teams
- Boston Red Sox (1911); Brooklyn Robins (1914); St. Louis Cardinals (1914); Boston Braves (1919)

Joseph Aloysius Riggert (December 11, 1886 – December 10, 1973) was an American outfielder in Major League Baseball. He played for the Boston Red Sox, Brooklyn Robins, St. Louis Cardinals, and Boston Braves. Riggert also had a long minor league baseball career and accumulated a total of 2,717 hits in the minors. He stood at 5 ft 9 in (1.75 m) and weighed 170 lbs.

== Career ==
Riggert was born in Janesville, Wisconsin. He started his professional baseball career in 1909, at the age of 22. The following season, he was the star of the Kansas State League. Playing for the Lyons Lions, he batted .362 and slugged .594 with 13 home runs; those three stats were each league-leading totals. Riggert was drafted by the Boston Red Sox that fall. He made his major league debut on May 12, 1911, and spent the season as a reserve outfielder. He hit just .212.

Riggert played for the American Association's St. Paul Saints in 1912. He hit just .240 that season. In 1913, he rebounded with a big season, leading the AA in triples (23), home runs (12), and total bases (280), while batting .292. One newspaper wrote that he was probably the fastest player in the league. This earned him another shot in the major leagues. However, Riggert again failed to stick; he hit just .203 in 1914 for the National League's Brooklyn Robins and St. Louis Cardinals.

Riggert returned to the St. Paul Saints and played there from 1915 to 1919. He continued to put up big slugging numbers, even in the "dead-ball era." In 1915, he led the league in home runs; in 1916, he led the league in triples; and in 1918, he led the league in hits, doubles, home runs, and total bases. After his 1918 performance, Riggert was acquired by the Boston Braves. He had the best major league season of career in 1919, batting .283 in 63 games. However, he played his last game in July before returning to St. Paul and never played in the majors again.

In 1920, Riggert led the American Association in triples for the third time and helped the Saints win their second straight pennant. The 1920 St. Paul squad was named by minorleaguebaseball.com as the sixth-best minor league team of all-time. Around 1921, the live-ball era arrived. Riggert was passed by other players and was no longer one of the premiere minor league sluggers. However, he continued to put up good numbers every year, and in 1924 he got his 2,000th minor league hit at the age of 37.

Riggert then went down a class to the Western League's Tulsa Oilers. In 1925, he hit .348, which was his highest batting average since 1910. He also stroked a league-leading 57 doubles. Riggert finished out his career with two seasons in the Illinois–Indiana–Iowa League. In 1927, at the age of 40, he hit .314.

All in all, Riggert had a total of 2,717 hits in 2,403 minor league games. Most of those were accomplished during his 12 years with the St. Paul Saints of the Class AA American Association. Riggert hit just .240 in the majors but .301 in the minors. He holds the record for career minor league triples, with 228. In 2003, baseball writer Bill James named Riggert as the best minor league baseball player of the 1910s.

Riggert died on December 10, 1973, in Kansas City, Missouri, one day before which would have been his 87th birthday.
