= Coffeyville Refiners =

- 1896–1924; (1896, 1902, 1906–1907, 1911, 1921–1924); Coffeyville, Kansas

Minor league affiliations
- Class: Independent (1896); Class D (1902, 1906–1907, 1911, 1921); Class C (1922–1924)
- League: Kansas State League (1896); Missouri Valley League (1902); Kansas State League (1906); Oklahoma-Arkansas-Kansas League (1907); Western Association (1911); Southwestern League (1921-1924)

Major league affiliations
- Team: None

Minor league titles
- League titles (1): 1923
- Wild card berths (1): 1923

Team data
- Name: Coffeyville (1896); Coffeyville Indians (1902); Coffeyville Bricks (1906); Coffeyville Glassblowers (1907); Coffeyville White Sox (1911); Coffeyville Refiners (1921–1924)
- Ballpark: Osborn Park (1896); Mineral Park (1902); Forest Park (1906–1907, 1911, 1921–1924)

The Coffeyville Refiners was the final nickname of the minor league baseball teams based in Coffeyville, Kansas.

Between 1896 and 1911, Coffeyville teams played as members of the 1896 Kansas State League, 1902 Missouri Valley League, 1906 Kansas State League, 1907 Oklahoma-Arkansas-Kansas League and 1911 Western Association, with a different nickname in each season. The "Refiners" played as members of the Class D level Southwestern League from 1921 to 1924, winning the 1923 league championship.

Coffeyville hosted home minor league games at Osborn Park in 1896, Mineral Park in 1902 and at Forest Park for the seasons between 1906 and 1924.

== History ==
=== Teams 1896–1911 ===
Coffeyville, Kansas first hosted minor league baseball in 1896. The Coffeyville team played as members of the 1896 Independent level Kansas State League. On August 20, 1896, the Kansas State League folded. Coffeyville was in second place with a record of 12–11, playing under manager Elmer Foster when the league folded. Coffeyville finished 3.5 games behind the first place Independence team in the final standings.

The 1902 Coffeyville Indians resumed play as members of the eight–team Class D level Missouri Valley League and relocated during the season. On June 23, 1902 Coffeyville moved to Chanute, Kansas with a record of 9–30 and finished the season as the Chanute Oilers. The Coffeyville/Chanute team placed sixth and finished the season with an overall record of 41–81, playing under managers Fred Porter, Larry Powers, J.G. Galbreath and Jack Jamison. The Coffeyville/Chanute team finished 44.0 games behind the first place Nevada Lunatics in the final standings With a record of 86–38, Nevada finished 2.5 games ahead of the second place Springfield Reds (83–40), who were followed by the Fort Scott Giants (80–44), Sedalia Goldbugs (72–48), Joplin Miners (56–66), Coffeyville Indians/ Chanute Oilers (41–81), Jefferson City Convicts (40–85) and Iola Gasbags (34–90) in the final standings.

Coffeyville, Kansas next hosted minor league baseball in 1906, when the Coffeyville Bricks became members of the eight–team Class D level Kansas State League. The Bricks joined the Bartlesville Indians, Chanute Browns, Fort Scott Giants, Independence Coyotes, Iola Grays, Parsons Preachers and Pittsburg Champs as members in the eight–team league.

The Coffeyville Bricks team ended the 1906 season in fifth place. The Bricks finished the season with a 58–50 record, playing under managers Ed Mahley, Harry Barndollar, Heisman and Ed Finney. The Bricks finished 6.5 games behind the first place Independence Coyotes in the final standings. The Kansas State League did not return to play in 1907.

The Coffeyville, Kansas use of the "Bricks" moniker corresponds to local industry in the era, as five brick plants were reportedly established in Coffeyville between 1900 and 1910, utilizing natural local clay resources.

The 1907 Coffeyville Glassblowers continued play in the new league and finished in second place. Coffeyville became members of the eight–team Class D level Oklahoma–Arkansas–Kansas League in 1907. With a final record of 71–57, managed by Bill Stuart, the Glassblowers finished 9.0 games behind the first place Bartlesville Boosters in the final standings. The Oklahoma–Arkansas–Kansas League permanently folded after the 1907 season.

The Coffeyville use of the "Glassblowers" moniker corresponds to local industry growth in the era. A total of eight glass factories were noted to have formed in Coffeyville between 1901 and 1910.

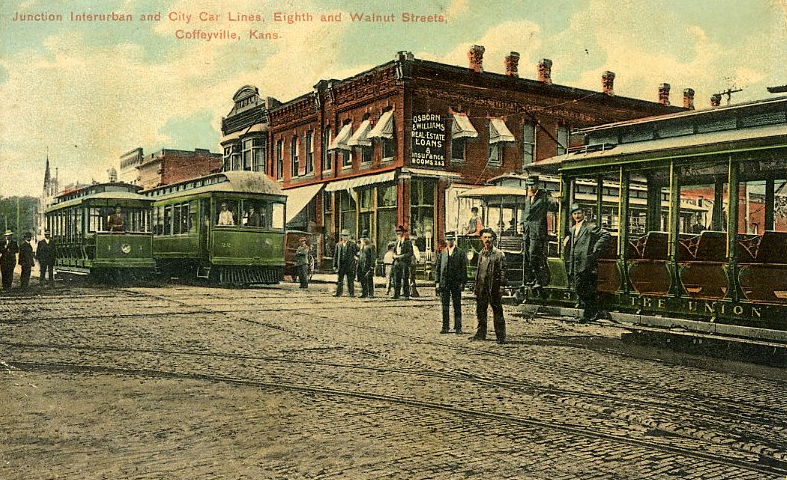
(1908) Coffeyville, Kansas

In 1911, the Coffeyville White Sox became members of the eight–team Class D level Western Association and folded during the season. On June 14, 1911 the White Sox folded with a record of 15–24, playing under manager Harry Bradbury. On June 18, 1911, the league disbanded after six Western Association teams had folded. The first place Ft. Scott Scouts were the final champion as the Western Association permanently folded following the 1911 season.

=== Southwestern League 1921–1924 ===
Resuming minor league play in 1921, the Coffeyville "Refiners" became a charter member of the Class D level Southwestern League. In their first season of play in the league, the Coffeyville Refiners placed fourth. With a 71–72 record under manager Josh Clarke, Coffeyville finished 38.0 games behind of the first place Independence Producers (103–38), who finished 19.0 games ahead of the second place Muskogee Mets. The 1921 final standings featured the Independence Producers, followed by the Muskogee Mets (93–56), Pittsburg Pirates (87–63), Coffeyville Refiners (71–72), Sapulpa Sappers (68–76), Bartlesville Braves (64–80), Miami Indians (59–84) and Parsons Parsons/Cushing Oilers (34–110) as charter members.

The Coffeyville use of the "Refiners" moniker corresponds to the prominent local industry. Coffeyville, Kansas was home to numerous refineries in the era, including the COOP Refinery, which continues today.

In 1922, the Coffeyville Refiners continued play as the Southwestern League became a Class C level league. The 1922 league was also referred to as the Southwestern Association. Playing under managers Joe Clark and Russ Ennis, Coffeyville ended the season with a regular season record 83–56, placing second overall, finishing 2.0 games behind the Muskogee Mets in the eight–team league, but did not qualify for the Finals, won by Sapulpa over Muskogee. Pitcher Oscar Middleton of Coffeyville led the Southwestern League with 23 wins.

Playing in the 1923 Class C level Southwestern League, the Coffeyville Refiners won the league championship. Coffeyville placed third in the regular season standings with a final record of 73–61, led by managers James Hansen and Charlie Bates. Coffeyville finished 11.0 games behind the first place Hutchinson Wheat Shockers. In the Playoff, Coffeyville swept Hutchinson in four games. After the season, the Southwestern League returned only three of the eight franchises in 1924, adding five new franchises to the 1924 league.

In their final season of minor league play, the 1924 Coffeyville Refiners folded from the Southwestern League during the season. On July 5, 1924, the franchise folded with a final record of 29–32, playing the partial season under manager Pat O'Byrne.

Coffeyville, Kansas has not hosted another minor league team.

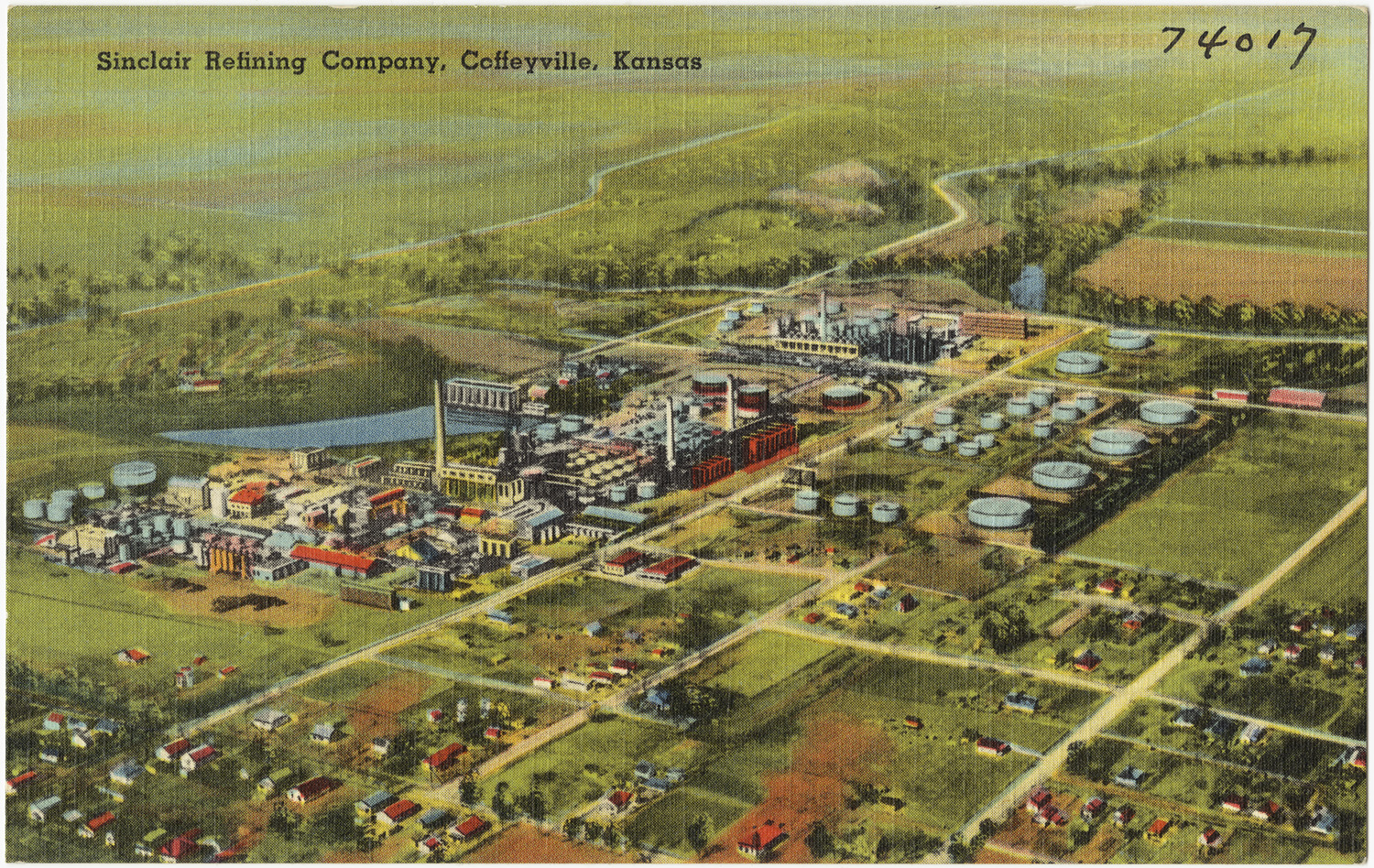
(1930) Sinclair Refining Company. Coffeyville, Kansas.

== The ballparks ==
In 1896, the Coffeyville minor league team hosted home games at Osborn Park. Osborn Park was noted to have been located at 1st Street & Beach to 5th Street & Walnut, Coffeyville, Kansas.

The 1902 Coffeyville Indians played home minor league games at Mineral Park. The ballpark was noted to have been located at 12th Street & Walnut, along the Verdigris River. The ballpark was said to have been located within Brown's Mineral Health Spa and Resort in Coffeyville, Kansas.

Beginning in 1906, the Coffeyville minor league teams played home games at Forest Park. Called "Walter Johnson Park" today, the park is still in use as a public park with a ballpark and other amenities. The ballpark today serves as home to the Coffeyville Community College teams. Walter Johnson Park is located at 715 Park Avenue Coffeyville, Kansas.

== Timeline ==
Year(s)	# Yrs.	Team	Level	League	Ballpark
1896	1	Coffeyville	Independent	Kansas State League	Osborn Park
1902	1	Coffeyville Indians	Class D	Missouri Valley League	Minreal Park
1906	1	Coffeyville Bricks	Class D	Kansas State League	Forest Park (Walter Johnson Park)
1907	1	Coffeyville Glassblowers	Class D	Oklahoma–Arkansas–Kansas League	Forest Park (Walter Johnson Park)
1911	1	Coffeyville White Sox	Class D	Western Association	Forest Park (Walter Johnson Park)
1921	1	Coffeyville Refiners	Class D	Southwestern League	Forest Park (Walter Johnson Park)
1922–1924	3	Coffeyville Refiners	Class C	Southwestern League	Forest Park (Walter Johnson Park)

== Season–by–season records ==
Year	Record	Win %	Manager	Finish	Playoffs/Notes
1896	12–11	.522	Elmer Foster	2nd	League folded August 20
1902	41–81	.336	Fred Porter / Larry Powers; J.G. Galbreath / Jack Jamison	6th	Moved to Chanute (9–30) June 23
1906	58–50	.537	Ed Mahley / Harry Barndollar; Heisman / Ed Finney	5th	No playoffs held
1907	71–57	.555	Bill Stuart	2nd	No playoffs held
1911	15–24	.385	Harry Bradbury	NA	Team folded June 14
1921	71–72	.497	Josh Clarke	4th	No playoffs held
1922	83–56	.597	Joe Clark / Russ Ennis	2nd	Did not qualify
1923	73–61	.541	James Hansen / Charlie Bates	3rd	League champions
1924	29–32	.475	Pat O'Byrne	NA	Team folded July 5

== Notable alumni ==
- Uke Clanton (1921)
- Russ Ennis (1922, MGR)
- Eddie Foster (1906)
- Tex Jeanes (1922)
- Ike Kahdot (1922)
- Billy Kelsey (1907)
- Pat McNulty (1922)
- Frank Moore (1907)
- Bill Stuart (1907, MGR)
- Bill Yohe (1906)

== See also ==
- Coffeyville Refiners players
- Coffeyville Bricks players
- Coffeyville Glassblowers players
