= Great Bend Millers =

- 1905–1914; (1905, 1909–1914); Great Bend, Kansas

Minor league affiliations
- Class: Class D (1905, 1909–1914)
- League: Kansas State League (1905, 1909–1911); Central Kansas League (1912); Kansas State League (1913–1914)

Major league affiliations
- Team: None

Minor league titles
- League titles (3): 1911; 1912; 1913

Team data
- Name: Great Bend Millers (1905, 1909–1914)
- Ballpark: Fairgrounds (1905); League Park (1909–1914)

The Great Bend Millers were a minor league baseball team based in Great Bend, Kansas. The "Millers" played as members of the Class D level Kansas State League in 1905 and from 1909 to 1911. Great Bend continues play in the Central Kansas League for one season in 1912 before returning to Kansas State League play in 1913 and 1914. Great Bend won three consecutive league championships from 1911 to 1913. Great Bend hosted home minor league games at the Fairgrounds in 1905 and at League Park in all the subsequent seasons.

== History ==
Minor league baseball in Great Bend, Kansas began with the 1905 Great Bend Millers, who began play as charter members of the six–team Class D level Kansas State League, when the league expanded during the season. On July 6, 1905, the Millers and the Lincoln Center team joined the league during the season, expanding the first year league from four to six teams. Great Bend finished the 1905 season with a record of 19–9 to place second, playing the season under managers James Durham and Carl Moore. Great Bend finished 4.5 games behind first place Ellsworth in the final standings. The Millers folded following the 1905 season.

The Great Bend use of the "Millers" nickname corresponds to the local agriculture industry of the era. Great Bend, Kansas agriculture and grain production remains a predominant local industry.

In 1909, minor league baseball resumed as the Great Bend Millers became members of the reformed eight–team Class D level Kansas State League. The Arkansas City-Winfield Twins, Hutchinson Salt Packers, Lyons Lions, McPherson Merry Macks, Newton Railroaders, Strong City-Cottonwood Falls Twins and Wellington Dukes joined Great Bend as 1909 league members.

After resuming minor league play, the Great Bend Millers placed fourth in the Kansas State League standings. Great Bend ended the 1909 season with a record of 49–48, playing under managers Rudy Kling and Stillings in the Kansas State League play. The Millers finished 11.5 games behind the first place Lyons Lions in the final standings.

Continuing play in 1910, the Great Bend Millers placed fifth in the Kansas State League standings. The Great Bend Millers finished the 1910 season with a record of 54–55. The Millers finished 16.0 games behind the first place Hutchinson Salt Packers in the final standings. Charles Lyons served as manager in 1910. Rolla Mapel, a Great Bend Millers pitcher led the league with 205 strikeouts.

The 1911 Great Bend Millers won the Kansas State League championship in a shortened season. The league disbanded on July 11, 1911, due to crop failures and drought. On the date the league folded, Great Bend was in first place with a 39–20 record behind managers Frank "Affie" Wilson and Wild Bill Luhrsen When the league ceased play, Millers were 0.5 games ahead of the second place Newton Railroaders in the shortened season standings.

The Great Bend Millers switched leagues in 1912 and won a second consecutive championship. Great Bend became members of the six–team Class D level Central Kansas League in 1912. The Millers ended the 1912 season with a 54–36 record to place first in the standings, as Affie Wilson returned as manager. Great Bend finished 2.0 games ahead of the second place Manhattan Giants. The Central Kansas League permanently folded following the 1912 season.

In 1913, the Great Bend Millers won their third consecutive championship. Great Bend continued play and joined the six–team Class D level Kansas State League. The Manhattan Giants and Junction City Soldiers folded from the league mid season. The Millers ended the 1913 season in first place with a 53–36 record, again winning a championship under returning manager Affie Wilson. Great Bend finished 1.5 games ahead of the second place Clay Center Cubs. Millers' pitcher Elmer Brown had 18 wins to lead the league.

The Great Bend Millers finished last and permanently folded after the 1914 season, after relocating in the final week of play. The Kansas State League reduced teams and played as a four–team league in its final season in 1914. Great Bend placed fourth under Affie Wilson, with a record of 35–54. On August 10, 1914, the franchise moved to Minneapolis, Kansas for last three games of season as the Kansas State League permanently folded following the season.

Affie Wilson, who managed Great Bend for four seasons, was by noted by researchers to have deep roots in Kansas baseball. Wilson was said to have had great skill in developing young baseball players and was reportedly greatly respected by both home and visiting players and fans. After managing the Great Bend Millers to their third consecutive championship in 1913, Affie Wilson was given a diamond ring by local boosters.

Great Bend, Kansas was without minor league play until 2016, when the Great Bend Boom played as members of the Independent level Pecos League.

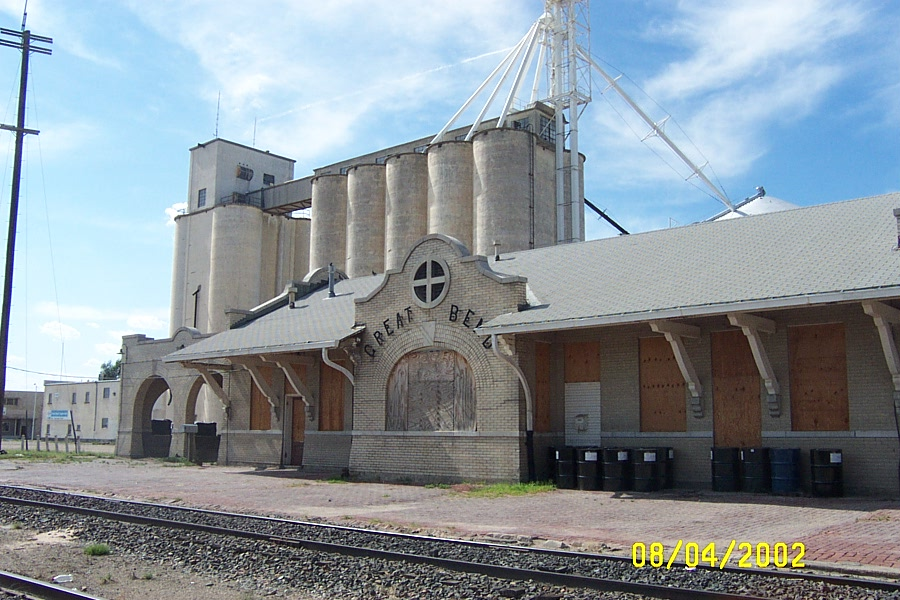
(2002) Great Bend Train Station and Grain Elevator. Great Bend, Kansas

== The ballparks ==
In 1905, the Great Bend Millers played home games at the Fairgrounds. The Fairgrounds were located on the East side of Great Bend, Kansas. Today, the Barton County Fair is still held at the fairgrounds, located at 1800 12th Street in Great Bend, Kansas.

The Great Bend Millers' home minor league ballpark from 1909 to 1914 was League Park. The ballpark was also known as East Side Park, Athletic Park and Sportsman's Park. The ballpark was located at Frey Street & Lakin Street in Great Bend, Kansas. Today, the site is residential.

== Timeline ==
Year(s)	# Yrs.	Team	Level	League	Ballpark
1905	1	Great Bend Millers	Class D	Kansas State League	Fairgrounds
1909–1911	3	Great Bend Millers	Class D	Kansas State League	League Park
1912	1	Great Bend Millers	Class D	Central Kansas League	League Park
1913–1914	2	Great Bend Millers	Class D	Kansas State League	League Park

== Year–by–year records ==
Year	Record	Finish	Manager	Playoffs/Notes
1905	19–9	2nd	James Durham / Carl Moore	Team entered league July 6
1909	49–48	4th	Rudy Kling / Stillings	No playoffs held
1910	54–55	5th	Charles Lyons	No playoffs held
1911	39–20	1st	Affie Wilson / Wild Bill Luhrsen	League champions
1912	54–36	1st	Affie Wilson	League champions
1913	53–36	1st	Affie Wilson	League champions
1914	35–54	4th	Affie Wilson	moved to Minneapolis August 10

== Notable alumni ==
- James Durham (1905, MGR)
- George Kaiserling (1910)
- Rudy Kling (1909, MGR)
- Wild Bill Luhrsen (1910), (1911, MGR)
- Rolla Mapel (1909–1910)
- Ovid Nicholson (1910, 1912)
- Harry Patton (1909)
- Bill Rumler (1913)
- Farmer Weaver (1910)

== See also ==
- Great Bend Millers players
