= Wild Bill Luhrsen =

American baseball player (1884–1973)

- Pitcher
- Born: April 14, 1884; Buckley, Illinois, U.S.
- Died: August 15, 1973 (aged 89); Little Rock, Arkansas, U.S.
- Batted: Right Threw: Right

MLB debut
- August 23, 1913, for the Pittsburgh Pirates

Last MLB appearance
- September 13, 1913, for the Pittsburgh Pirates

MLB statistics
- Win–loss record: 3-1
- Earned run average: 2.48
- Strikeouts: 11
- Stats at Baseball Reference

Teams
- Pittsburgh Pirates (1913)

William Ferdinand "Wild Bill" Luhrsen (April 14, 1884 – August 15, 1973) was an American pitcher in Major League Baseball. He played for the Pittsburgh Pirates in 1913.
