= Leavenworth Soldiers =

Defunct American baseball team

The Leavenworth Soldiers was the first professional baseball team from Leavenworth, Kansas. The club played in the Western League from 1886 to 1888. Their first year, they tied the Lincoln Tree Planters for last place at 31-49 despite the presence of Jake Beckley, who hit .341 and led the Western League with 113 hits while showing some pop. In 1887, the Soldiers were 27-27 when they disbanded on July 8 due to poor attendance. Beckley had another fine year, hitting .401 with 33 doubles between Leavenworth and Lincoln. In 1888, Leavenworth returned to the loop and went 7-7 under L. M. Cretors. They were in second place when the league stopped operations on June 21. A J. Curran was leading the club in batting average at .300.
