= Lyons Lions =

- 1909–1913; Lyons, Kansas

Minor league affiliations
- Class: Class D (1909–1913)
- League: Kansas State League (1909–1911); Central Kansas League (1912); Kansas State League (1913)

Major league affiliations
- Team: None

Minor league titles
- League titles (1): 1909

Team data
- Name: Lyons Lions (1909–1913)
- Ballpark: Workman Park* (1909–1913)

The Lyons Lions were a minor league baseball team based in Lyons, Kansas. From 1909 to 1911, Lyons played as members of the Class D level Kansas State League, Central Kansas League in 1912 and Kansas State League in 1913.

== History ==
Minor league baseball in Lyons, Kansas began with the 1909 Lyons "Lions." Lyons became members of the reformed eight–team Class D level Kansas State League. The Arkansas City-Winfield Twins, Great Bend Millers, Hutchinson Salt Packers, McPherson Merry Macks, Newton Railroaders, Strong City-Cottonwood Falls Twins and Wellington Dukes joined Lyons as 1909 league members.

In their first season of play, the Lyons Lions won the 1909 Kansas State League championship. Lyons ended the 1909 season with a record of 61–37, to finish first in the Kansas State League. The Lions finished 0.5 games ahead of the second place Hutchinson Salt Packers as Cecil Bankhead served as manager in leading the team to the championship. Pitcher Robert Hassler of Lyons led the league with 25 wins and 193 strikeouts. No playoffs were held for the duration of the league.

On June 21, 1909, Lyons and McPherson played a 21–inning game at McPherson. Lyons defeated the McPherson Merry Macks 2–1 in the contest, which was played in 2:50.

Continuing play in 1910, Lyons placed third in the Kansas State League standings. The Lyons Lions finished the 1910 season with a record of 57–53 as Cecil Bankhead, Joe Riggert, Hi Ebright and John Jones served as managers. Player/manager Joe Riggert led the Kansas State League with a .362 batting average and 13 home runs, while teammate Walt Sizemore led the league with 18 wins. The Lions finished 13.5 games behind the first place Hutchinson Salt Packers in the final standings.

The 1911 Lyons Lions of the Kansas State League ended the 1911 season with a record of 37–27, playing a shortened season. The league disbanded on July 11, 1911, due to crop failures and drought. When the league ceased play, Lyons was in third place in the standings. Spencer Abbott served as manager, as the Lions finished 4.5 games behind the first place Great Bend Millers in the shortened season.

The Lyons Lions switched leagues in 1912, as Lyons became members of the six–team Class D level Central Kansas League The Lions ended the 1912 season with a 36–54 record, placing fifth in the standings. Blackie Wilson served as manager, as Lyons finished 18.0 games behind the first place Great Bend Millers. The Central Kansas League permanently folded following the 1912 season.

In 1913, the Lyons Lions played their final season. Lyons continued play and joined the six–team Class D level Kansas State League. The Manhattan Giants and Junction City Soldiers folded from the league mid season. The Lions ended their final Kansas State League season with a record of 50–39, placing third. The Lions finished 3.0 games behind the first place Great Bend Millers as William Nelson served as the Lyons' manager. Lyons pitcher J.L. O'Byrne led the league with 17 wins in the shortened season.

Lyons folded after the 1913 season as the Kansas State played as a four–team league in 1914. Lyons, Kansas has not hosted another minor league team.

Today, the "Lyons Lions" nickname is still in use locally by Lyons High School sports teams.

== The ballparks ==
The exact name and location of the Lyons Lions' home ballpark is not directly referenced. In the era, Workman Park was the only public park in Lyons, established in 1882. The park is still in use today as a public park.

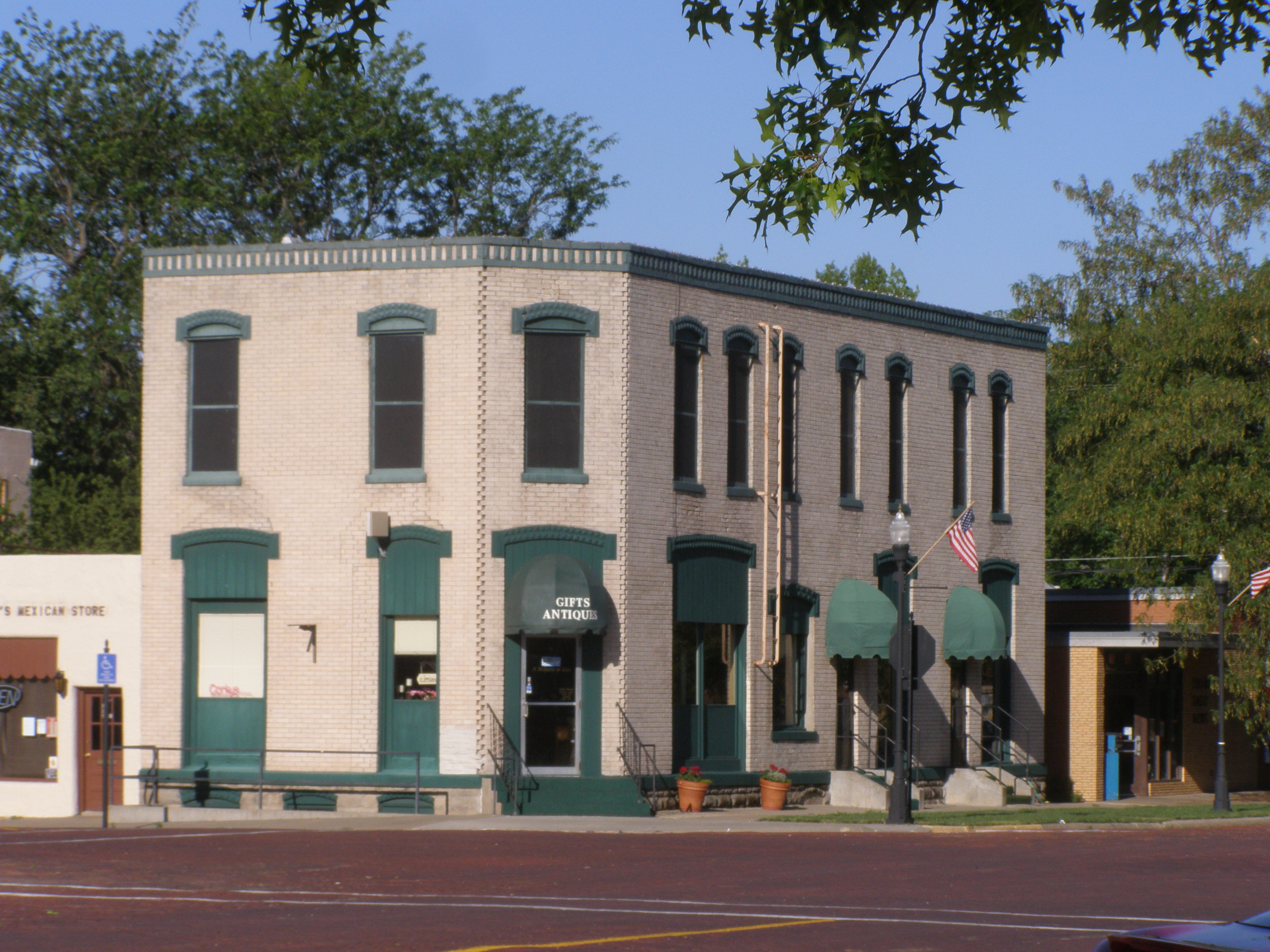
(2012) Lyons, Kansas

== Timeline ==
| Year(s) | # Yrs. | Team | Level | League |
|---|---|---|---|---|
| 1909–1911 | 3 | Lyons Lions | Class D | Kansas State League |
| 1912 | 1 | Lyons Lions | Class D | Central Kansas League |
| 1913 | 1 | Lyons Lions | Class D | Kansas State League |

== Year–by–year records ==
| Year | Record | Finish | Manager | Playoffs/Notes |
|---|---|---|---|---|
| 1909 | 61–37 | 1st | Cecil Bankhead | League champions |
| 1910 | 57–53 | 3rd | Cecil Bankhead/ Joe Riggert; Mills Ebright / John Jones | No playoffs held |
| 1911 | 37–27 | 3rd | Spencer Abbott | No playoffs held |
| 1912 | 36–54 | 5th | Fred Wilson | No playoffs held |
| 1913 | 50–39 | 3rd | William Nelson | No playoffs held |

== Notable alumni ==
- Coonie Blank (1911)
- Lee Dressen (1910–1911)
- Ben Harris (1909)
- Carl Manda (1909, 1912)
- John Misse (1911)
- Joe Riggert (1909), (1910, MGR)
- Farmer Weaver (1910)
- Dutch Wetzel (1912)

== See also ==
Lyons Lions players

== External references ==
- Lyons - Baseball Reference
