= Otis Lambeth =

American baseball player (1890–1976)

- Pitcher
- Born: May 13, 1890; Berlin, Kansas, U.S.
- Died: June 5, 1976 (aged 86); Moran, Kansas, U.S.
- Batted: Right Threw: Right

MLB debut
- July 16, 1916, for the Cleveland Indians

Last MLB appearance
- April 24, 1918, for the Cleveland Indians

MLB statistics
- Win–loss record: 11–10
- Earned run average: 3.18
- Strikeouts: 58
- Stats at Baseball Reference

Teams
- Cleveland Indians (1916–1918)

Otis Samuel Lambeth (May 13, 1890 – June 5, 1976) was an American Major League Baseball pitcher who played for three seasons. He played for the Cleveland Indians from 1916 to 1918, pitching in 43 career games.
