= Farmer Weaver =

American baseball player (1865–1943)

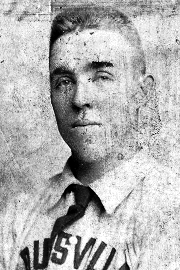
- Outfielder
- Born: March 23, 1865; Parkersburg, West Virginia, U.S.
- Died: January 23, 1943 (aged 77); Akron, Ohio, U.S.
- Batted: Both Threw: Unknown

MLB debut
- September 16, 1888, for the Louisville Colonels

Last MLB appearance
- September 29, 1894, for the Pittsburgh Pirates

MLB statistics
- Batting average: .278
- Hits: 856
- Runs batted in: 344
- Stolen bases: 162
- Stats at Baseball Reference

Teams
- Louisville Colonels (1888–1894); Pittsburgh Pirates (1894)

William B. "Farmer" Weaver (March 23, 1865 – January 23, 1943) was an American professional baseball player in the Major Leagues from 1888 to 1894, for the Louisville Colonels and Pittsburgh Pirates. Primarily an outfielder (649 games), he also played 73 games at catcher, and 34 games at infield positions.

On August 12, 1890, Weaver hit for the cycle while also getting six hits in one game, a feat that would not be matched in the modern era (post-1900) until Ian Kinsler did so for the Texas Rangers on April 15, 2009.

Weaver experienced the highs and lows of baseball during a two-year period, 1889–1890. He was the starting centerfielder for the Louisville Colonels in both seasons. The 1889 Louisville Colonels season was a disaster, as the team lost 111 games and finished in last place. But the 1890 Louisville Colonels season was historic, as the Colonels won the American Association pennant, becoming the first team in major league history to go from "worst to first" in the span of a single year. The club's remarkable achievement is celebrated in a 2026 book, The 1890 Louisville Cyclones, written by Perry T. Cooper and published by McFarland & Company, Publishers. Weaver is mentioned frequently in this book.

On August 9, 1893, Weaver served as the first base umpire in the second game of a doubleheader between his own Louisville Colonels and the Cleveland Spiders, after the assigned umpire (Thomas Lynch) had become ill; Jack O'Connor of Cleveland served as the home plate umpire.

After his major league career ended, Weaver played minor league baseball and also worked on a farm he'd purchased in Kansas. He and his wife, Dora, were childless; in 1901 they adopted a seven-year-old orphan girl and named her Hazel. Weaver and his wife then divorced in 1909. In 1910, Hazel gave birth to a son; she revealed a year later that William Weaver was the baby's father, and claimed that he had been molesting her since she was 11 years old. Weaver fled the state but was eventually captured. He pleaded guilty to rape and served time in the Kansas State Penitentiary, but he happened to be a friend of George H. Hodges, the Governor of Kansas, and after serving only about three years of his possible 20-year sentence, he was paroled by the governor. Weaver left Kansas and ended up in Akron, Ohio, where he worked for the Goodyear Tire and Rubber Company.

== See also ==
- List of Major League Baseball career stolen bases leaders
- List of Major League Baseball single-game hits leaders
- List of Major League Baseball players to hit for the cycle

Achievements
| Preceded by John Reilly | Hitting for the cycle August 12, 1890 | Succeeded by Jimmy Ryan |
