= McPherson Merry Macks =

- 1908–1911; McPherson, Kansas

Minor league affiliations
- Class: Class D (1908–1911)
- League: Central Kansas League (1908); Kansas State League (1909–1911)

Major league affiliations
- Team: None

Minor league titles
- League titles (0): None

Team data
- Name: McPherson Merry Macks (1908–1911)
- Ballpark: County Fair Association Fairgrounds (1908–1911)

The McPherson Merry Macks were a minor league baseball team based in McPherson, Kansas. The "Merry Macks" played as members of the 1908 Class D level Central Kansas League and Kansas State League from 1909 to 1911. McPherson hosted home minor league games at the County Fair Association Fairgrounds.

== History ==
Minor league baseball in McPherson, Kansas began in 1908, when the McPherson "Merry Macs" became charter members of the six–team Class D level Central Kansas League. The Ellsworth Blues, Little River, Minneapolis Minnies, Newton Browns and Salina Trade Winners teams joined McPherson in beginning league play on June 22, 1908.

Ending the season with a record of 20–27, the Merry Macks finished their first season in fifth place, playing under managers Earl Burgess, Andy Clawson and Charles Taylor Davis. McPherson finished 9.5 games behind the first place Minneapolis Minnies in the final standings.

On May 26, 1908, at the Athletic Park in Newton, the Newton Railroaders and McPherson Merry Macks played a 20–inning game. In a contest lasting 3:15 and ending at 6:45 P.M., Newton defeated McPherson 3–2.

In 1909, the McPherson franchise switched leagues, as the Central Kansas League continued play without a McPherson team. The Merry Macks became members of the reformed eight–team Class D level Kansas State League. The Arkansas City-Winfield Twins, Great Bend Millers, Hutchinson Salt Packers, Larned Cowboys, Lyons Lions, Newton Railroaders and Wellington Dukes teams joined with McPherson as 1909 league members. The Kansas State League reformed after having last played in 1906.

On July 27, 1909, McPherson and the Lyons Lions played a 21–inning game at McPherson. Lyons won the game 2–1 in the contest played in 2:50.

In their first season of Kansas State League play, the 1909 McPherson Merry Macks finished in third place. McPherson ended the season with a 59–37 record, playing under managers Earl Burgess, Andy Clawson and Charles Taylor. In a close race, the Merry Macks finished 1.0 game behind the first place Lyons Lions and 0.5 game behind the second place Hutchinson Salt Packers in the final Kansas State League standings. The league held no playoffs. Jasper Hainsey of the McPherson Merry Macks scored 66 runs to lead the Kansas State League.

Continuing play as members of the 1910 Kansas State League, the McPherson Merry Macks placed second in the eight–team league. The Merry Macks finished the season with a record of 59–52, playing under manager Charles Conklin. The Merry Macks finished 11.0 games behind the first place Hutchinson Salt Packers in the final 1910 standings.

In 1911, the McPherson Merry Macks played their final season, as the Kansas State League folded during the season. On July 11, 1911, the Kansas State League folded and McPherson Merry Macks ended the season with a record of 31–28. The league reportedly disbanded due to crop failures and drought. When the league ceased play, McPherson was in fourth place in the standings. Joseph Harris served as manager, as the Merry Macks finished 8.0 games behind the first place Great Bend Millers in the shortened season.

After the Kansas State League folded in 1911, McPherson, Kansas has not hosted another minor league team.

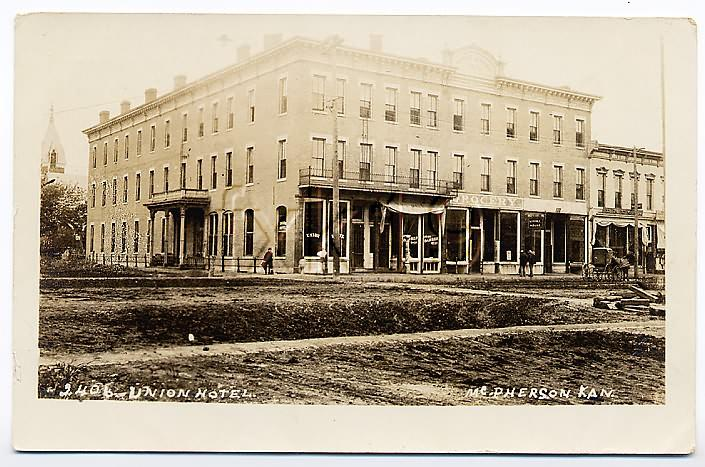
(1907) Union Hotel. McPherson Kansas

== The ballpark ==
The McPherson Merry Macks' hosted home minor league games at the County Fair Association Fairgrounds. Constructed in 1905, the fairgrounds reportedly hosted games on a diamond in the middle of the oval for the 1/2 mile oval track, with a new grandstand build behind home plate in 1908 to accommodate the McPherson Merry Macks beginning minor league play. The site today is noted to be home of the historic Light Capital Baseball Diamond, located at 551 South Fisher in McPherson, Kansas.

== Timeline ==
Year(s)	# Yrs.	Team	Level	League	Ballpark
1908	1	McPherson Merry Macks	Class D	Central Kansas League	County Fair Association Fairgrounds
1909–1911	3	McPherson Merry Macks	Class D	Kansas State League	County Fair Association Fairgrounds

== Year–by–year records ==
Year	Record	Finish	Manager	Playoffs/Notes
1908	20–27	5th	Earl Burgess / Andy Clawson / Charles Taylor	No playoffs held
1909	59–37	3rd	Earl Green / Owen Depew	No playoffs held
1910	59–52	2nd	Charles Conklin	No playoffs held
1911	31–28	4th	Joseph Harris	League folded July 11

== Notable alumni ==
No alumni of the McPherson Merry Macks reached the major leagues.
