= Independence Coyotes =

Minor league baseball team (1906)

- 1906; Independence, Kansas

Minor league affiliations
- Class: Class D
- League: Kansas State League

Minor league titles
- League titles: 1906

The Independence Coyotes were a minor league baseball team located in Independence, Kansas, for the 1906 baseball season.

The Coyotes went 69-48 and were champions of the Class D Kansas State League by 4.5 games over the second-place Cherryvale Boosters. Ben Haas hit .341 to lead the league, while pitcher Chick Brandom paced the circuit with 16 wins and 121 strikeouts.

The Kansas State League folded after the season, and the Coyotes moved to the Oklahoma–Arkansas–Kansas League and became known as the Independence Champs. Drummond Brown and Chick Brandom from the Coyotes would go on to play in the major leagues. Brandom would end up winning the World Series with the Pittsburgh Pirates in 1909.

== Year-by-year record ==
Year	Record	Finish	Manager
1906	69-48	1st League Champs	Charles McLinn / Richard Louis Crutcher / John Hendley

== Timeline of Independence minor league teams ==
Year(s)	# Yrs.	Team	Level	League	Affiliate
1896	1	Independence	Independent	Kansas State League	None
1906	1	Independence Coyotes	Class D	Kansas State League	None
1907	1	Independence Champs	Class D	Oklahoma-Arkansas-Kansas League	None
1908	1	Independence Jewelers	Class D	Oklahoma-Kansas League	None
1911	1	Independence Packers	Class D	Western Association	None
1921	1	Independence Producers	Class D	Southwestern League	None
1922–1923	2	Independence Producers	Class C	Southwestern League	None
1924	1	Independence Producers	Class D	Southwestern League	None
1925, 1928–1932	6	Independence Producers	Class C	Western Association	None
1947–1950	4	Independence Yankees	Class D	Kansas-Oklahoma-Missouri League	New York Yankees
1952	1	Independence Browns	Class D	Kansas-Oklahoma-Missouri League	St. Louis Browns
