= Newton Railroaders =

- 1909–1924; (1888, 1909–1912, 1924); Newton, Kansas

Minor league affiliations
- Class: Independent (1888); Class D (1908–1912, 1924)
- League: Western League (1888); Central Kansas League (1908); Kansas State League (1909–1911); Central Kansas League (1912); Southwestern League (1924)

Major league affiliations
- Team: None

Minor league titles
- League titles (0): None
- Conference titles (1): 1924

Team data
- Name: Newton (1888); Newton Browns (1908); Newton Railroaders (1909–1912, 1924)
- Ballpark: Athletic Park (1908–1912, 1924)

The Newton Railroaders were a minor league baseball team based in Newton, Kansas between 1909 and 1924. The Railroaders played as members of the Kansas State League from 1909 to 1911, Central Kansas League in 1912 and Southwestern League in 1924, winning the 1924 league championship.

The Railroaders were preceded in minor league play by the 1888 Newton team as the team was the first professional team in Newton and played the season as members of the 1888 Western League. The 1988 team was followed in minor league play by the 1908 Newton Browns, who played as members of the Central Kansas League.

he Newton Browns and Railroaders teams hosted minor league home games at Athletic Park in Newton.

== History ==
Minor league baseball in Newton, Kansas began during the 1888 season. The Newton team played briefly as members of the four–team Independent level Western League. Newton entered the league on June 11, 1888, after the Lincoln franchise had folded a week earlier. Newton compiled a 3–5 record under manager Dick Juvenal in their brief period of play. On June 23, 1888, the Western League folded.

In 1908, Newton resumed minor league play after a twenty-year hiatus. The Newton Browns became charter members of the six–team Class D level Central Kansas League. Ending the season with a record of 25–22, the Browns finished the season in second place, playing under manager Karl Becker. Newton finished 4.5 games behind the first place Minneapolis Minnies in the final standings.

On May 26, 1908, at Athletic Park in Newton, Kansas, Newton and the McPherson Merry Macks played a 20–inning game. In a contest lasting 3:15 and ending at 6:45 P.M., Newton defeated McPherson 3–2.

In 1909, the Newton "Railroaders" continued play in a new league. Newton became members of the reformed eight–team Class D level Kansas State League. Newton joined the Arkansas City-Winfield Twins, Great Bend Millers, Hutchinson Salt Packers, Larned Cowboys, Lyons Lions, McPherson Merry Macks and Wellington Dukes as 1909 league members.

The Newton, Kansas use of the "Railroaders" moniker corresponds to local industry and culture. The city was reportedly founded in 1871 when the Atchison, Topeka & Santa Fe Railroad extended a main line west from Emporia, Kansas. Newton, Kansas was named after Newton, Massachusetts, home to some of the railroad company stockholders. The Santa Fe Depot in Newton, Kansas is listed on the National Register of Historic Places, as is the Railroad Savings and Loan Building. Today, Newton continues to serve the railroad, hosting the Newton Station, which serves 15,000 riders annually as a stop of the Southwest Chief Amtrak line.

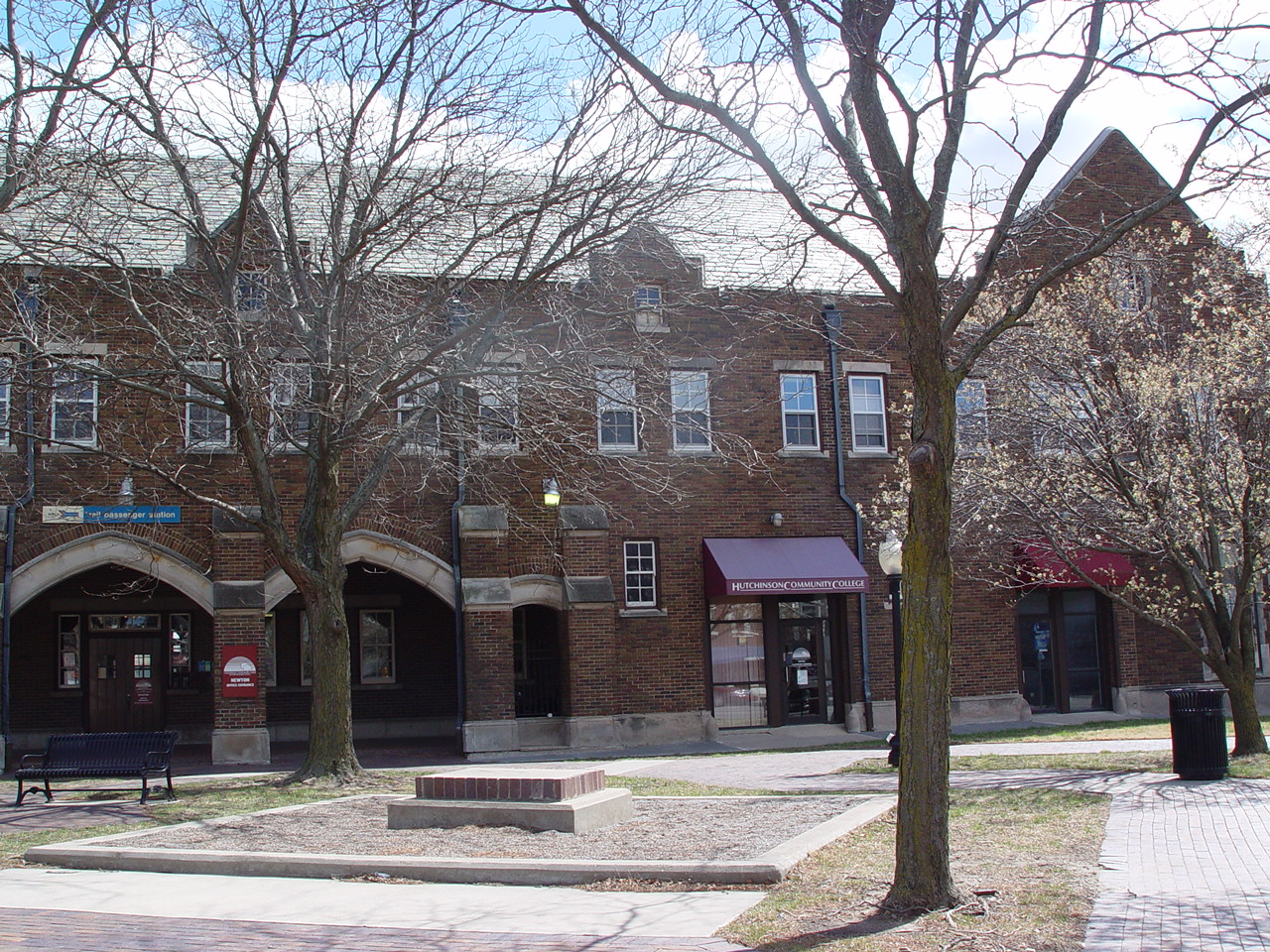
(2007) Newton Depot. National Register of Historic Places. Newton, Kansas

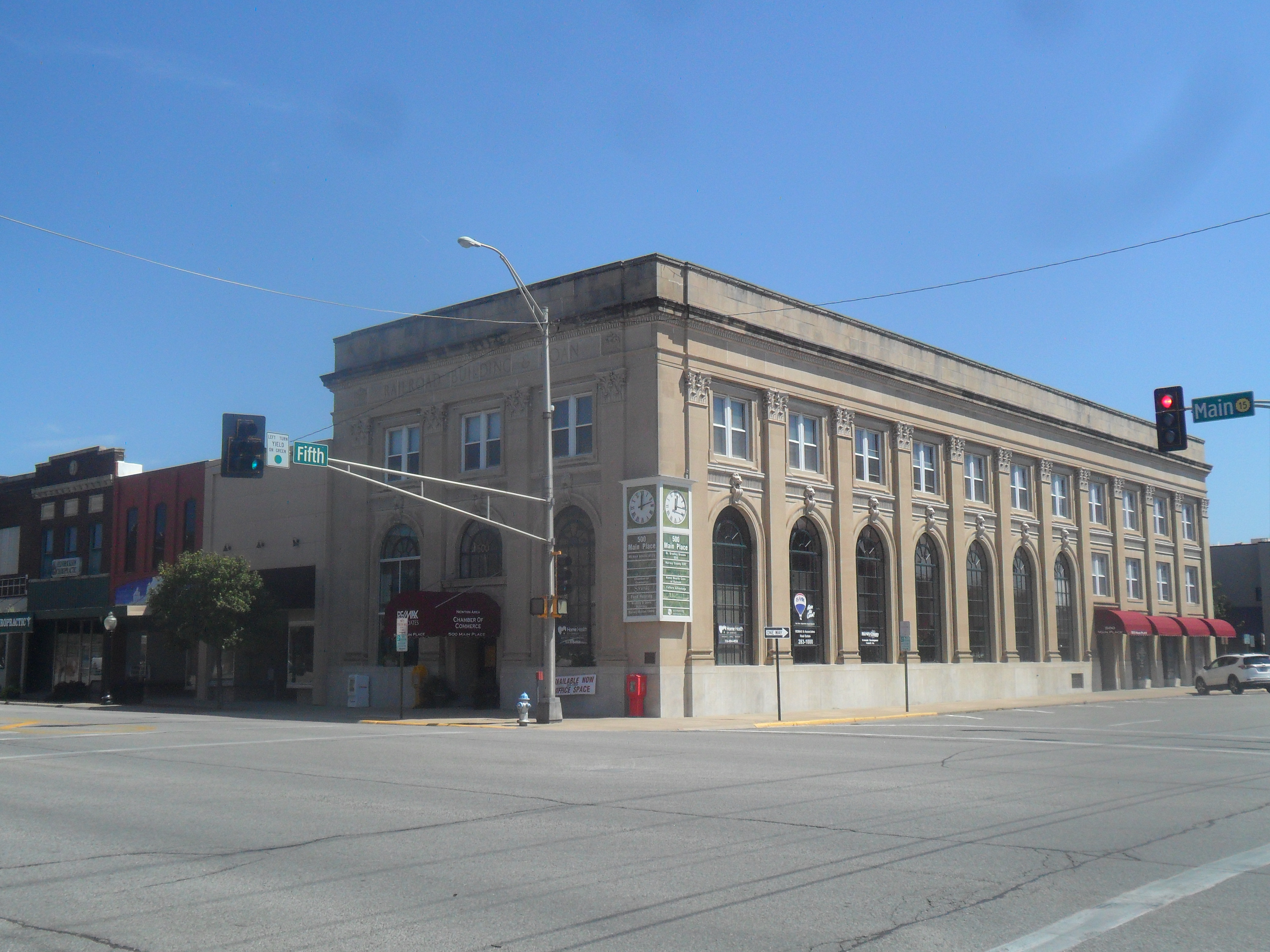
(2018) Railroad Savings and Loan Building. National Register of Historic Places. Newton, Kansas

In their first season of Kansas State League play, the Newton Railroaders placed sixth in the 1909 Kansas State League. The Railroaders finished with a 42–54 overall record to end the season to place sixth in the eight–team league. Playing under managers Con Harlow and William Stilwell, the Railroaders finished 18.0 games behind the first place Lyons Lions in the final Kansas State League standings.

Continuing play as members of the 1910 Kansas State League, the Newton Railroaders finished the season with a record of 56–54 to place fourth under manager Mel Backus. The Railroaders finished 16.5 games behind the first place Hutchinson Salt Packers in the final 1910 standings of the eight–team league.

The 1911 Newton Railroaders continued play as the Kansas State League folded during the season. The Kansas State League folded on July 11, 1911. The Railroaders ended the 1911 season with a record of 39–21 record, after the league disbanded on July 11, 1911, due to crop failures and drought. When the league ceased play, Newton was in second place in the standings, as the Railroaders finished 0.5 game behind the first place Great Bend Millers (39–20) in the shortened season.

In 1912, the Newton Railroaders rejoined the Central Kansas League. On July 12, 1912, the Newton franchise moved to Minneapolis, Kansas with a record of 16–11. Overall, the Newton/Minneapolis team finished the season with an overall record of 50–40 to place third, playing under returning manager William Stilwell. Newton finished 4.0 games behind the first place Great Bend Millers in the final standings. The Central Kansas League folded following the season.

After a twelve-year gap in minor league play, Newton had a final season playing as members of the 1924 Class D level Southwestern League. The Newton Railroaders played their final season in 1924, relocating twice due to a ballpark issue. The team won the pennant, finishing with a record of 79–50 under manager John McCloskey. It was reported that a windstorm collapsed the grandstand at Newton's Athletic Park on July 23, 1924, during a game with the Arkansas City Osages. Twenty people were injured. As a result of the damage, Newton moved to Blackwell (7–4) on July 26, 1924. Blackwell moved to Ottawa (13–12) on August 5, 1924. Ottawa then returned to Newton on August 28, 1924. In the playoff Finals, the Arkansas City Osages defeated the Newton Railroaders/Blackwell/Ottawa Gassers 4 gamed to 3. The league folded following the season.

Newton, Kansas has not hosted another minor league team.

== The ballpark ==
Beginning in 1908, the Newton minor league teams were noted to have played home games at Athletic Park. Reportedly, a windstorm destroyed the grandstand on July 23, 1924, during a game with Arkansas City. Twenty people were injured. Athletic Park is still in use today as a public park containing Fischer Field Stadium, which is listed on the National Register of Historic Places. Athletic Park is located at 701 1st Street in Newton, Kansas.

== Timeline ==
Year(s)	# Yrs.	Team	Level	League	Ballpark
1888	1	Newton	Independent	Western League	Unknown
1908	1	Newton Browns	Class D	Central Kansas League	Athletic Park
1909–1911	3	Newton Railroaders	Class D	Kansas State League	Athletic Park
1912	1	Newton Railroaders	Class D	Central Kansas League	Athletic Park
1924	1	Newton Railroaders	Class D	Southwestern League	Athletic Park

== Year–by–year records ==
Year	Record	Finish	Manager	Playoffs/Notes
1888	3–5	NA	Dick Juvenal	Entered league June 11; League folded June 23
1908	25–22	2nd	Karl Becker	No playoffs Held
1909	42–54	6th	Con Harlow / William Stilwell	No playoffs held
1910	56–54	4th	Mel Backus	No playoffs held
1911	39–21	2nd	Mel Backus	League folded July 11
1912	50–40	3rd	William Stilwell	Newton moved to Minneapolis (16–11) July 12
1924	79–50	1st	John McCloskey	Newton moved to Blackwell (7–4) on July 26; Blackwell moved to Ottawa (13–12) August 5 Ottawa moved to Newton August 28; Lost in league finals

== Notable alumni ==
- Nick Allen (1910–1911)
- Al Bashang (1911)
- Bill Kemmer (1909)
- John McCloskey (1924, MGR)
- Edgar McNabb (1888)
- Ross Reynolds (1912)
- Cy Slapnicka (1909) Cleveland Guardians Hall of Fame

== See also ==
- Newton Railroaders players
- Newton (minor league baseball) players
