= Harry Berte =

American baseball player (1872–1952)

- Second baseman / Shortstop
- Born: May 10, 1872; Covington, Kentucky, U.S.
- Died: May 6, 1952 (aged 79); Los Angeles, California, U.S.
- Batted: Right Threw: Right

MLB debut
- September 17, 1903, for the St. Louis Cardinals

Last MLB appearance
- September 22, 1903, for the St. Louis Cardinals

MLB statistics
- Games: 4
- At bats: 15
- Hits: 5
- Stats at Baseball Reference

Teams
- St. Louis Cardinals (1903)

Harry Thomas Berte (May 10, 1872 – May 6, 1952) was an American Major League Baseball player. Williams played for the St. Louis Cardinals in the 1903 season. In four games, he had five hits in 15 at-bats, with one walk.

He was born in Covington, Kentucky and died in Los Angeles, California.
