= Parsons Preachers =

The Parsons Preachers were a minor league baseball team based in Parsons, Kansas that played in the Class-C Missouri Valley League in 1905, the Class-D Kansas State League in 1906 and the Class-D Oklahoma–Arkansas–Kansas League in 1907. They were the last minor league team to be based in Parsons until 1921.

Babe Adams and Charlie Rhodes played for the unaffiliated team.
