= Chanute (baseball team) =

There have been five Minor leagues teams that have represented the city of Chanute, Kansas. Since classification of the minors began, all of them have been labeled as class D loops.

== Chanute Oilers ==
The Chanute Oilers became a member of the Missouri Valley League in 1902. The team started playing as the Coffeyville Indians before being renamed during the midseason. The Coffeyville/Chanute team posted a combined record of 41-81 and finished sixth in the eight-team league, 44 games behind the first place team.

== Chanute Browns ==
In 1906, the team was named the Chanute Browns and was part of the Kansas State League. The squad lasted only that season, ending sixth with a 51-64 record in the eight-team league 36 games out of first place.

== Chanute Owls/Athletics/Giants ==
After a 39-year absence, a later version of the team became a founding member of the Kansas–Oklahoma–Missouri League in 1946. They continued to operate in the league until 1950.

The team played as the Chanute Owls in 1946, tying for first place and winning the first round of the postseason. Then, Chanute and Iola tied 3-3 in final playoff games that counted. Although Chanute won another contest, it was later ruled a non-game after a dispute arose between both club officials. Finally, the series never was settled.

The Owls changed its name to the Chanute Owls Athletics, and played under this name between the 1946–1947 and 1949–1950 seasons. In 1948, they played as the Chanute Giants and were a New York Giants affiliated team. But Chanute declined through its last five seasons in the eight-team circuit, finishing 7th in 1947 (44-80), 8th in 1948 (44-78), 5th in 1949 (65-60) and 8th in 1950 (35-89).

Since 1950, no other team based in Chanute, Kansas has played in a professional league.

== Team highlight ==
- In 1946, left-handed Ross Grimsley led all KOML pitchers in W–L record (18-5), W–L% (.783), strikeouts (295) and earned run average (1.93).
