= Bartlesville Bearcats =

- 1923–1924; (1921–1924); Bartlesville, Oklahoma

Minor league affiliations
- Class: Class D (1921); Class C (1922–1924)
- League: Southwestern League (1921-1923); Western Association (1924)

Major league affiliations
- Team: None

Minor league titles
- League titles (0): None

Team data
- Name: Bartlesville Braves (1921); Bartlesville Grays (1922); Bartlesville Bearcats (1923–1924); Bartlesville Boosters (1924)
- Ballpark: Johnstone Park (1921–1924)

The Bartlesville Bearcats were a minor league baseball team based in Bartlesville, Oklahoma. Bartlesville teams played as members of the Class D and Class C level Southwestern League from 1921 to 1923. After leaving the southwestern League, Bartlesville hosted two separate partial season teams in the 1924 Western Association. Bartlesville teams were known by a different nickname in each season.

The Bartlesville teams hosted home minor league games at Johnstone Park.

== History ==
=== 1921 to 1923 Southwestern Association ===
Bartlesville first hosted a town team called the "Brickbats" beginning in 1895.

Bartlesville Oklahoma, first hosted minor league baseball in 1906, when the Bartlesville Indians played the season as members of the Class D level Kansas State League. The Southwestern League teams were preceded in minor league play by the 1910 Bartlesville Boosters, managed by Baseball Hall of Fame member Jake Beckley, who ended a four-year tenure as members of the Class C level Western Association.

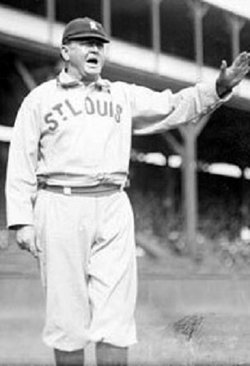
John McCloskey, St. Louis Cardinals Manager, 1906 to 1908. McCloskey managed the Bartlesville Braves in 1921.

Resuming minor league play in 1921, the Bartlesville "Braves" became a charter member of the eight-team, Class D level Southwestern League. The Coffeyville Refiners, Independence Producers, Miami Indians, Muskogee Mets, Parsons Parsons, Pittsburg Pirates and Sapulpa Sappers teams joined Bartlesville in beginning league play on April 21, 1921.

On February 12, 1921, John McCloskey was announced as the manager of the Braves to begin the season. McCloskey was a long-time minor league manager, who had been the St. Louis Cardinals manager from 1906 through the 1908 season and had previously managed the major league Louisville Colonels.

In their first season of Southwestern League play, the Bartlesville Braves placed sixth in the eight-team league. With a 64–80 record under managers John McCloskey and Ad Lindsey, Bartlesville finished 38.5 games behind the first place Independence Producers (103–38), who finished 19.0 games ahead of the second place Muskogee Mets. The 1921 final standings featured Independence, followed by the Muskogee (93–56), the Pittsburg Pirates (87–63), Coffeyville Refiners (71–72), Sapulpa Sappers (68–76), Bartlesville Braves (64–80), Miami Indians (59–84) and Parsons Parsons/Cushing Oilers (34–110) playing the charter season of the league.

In 1922, the Bartlesville "Grays" continued play as the Southwestern League became a Class C level league. The 1922 league was also referred to as the Southwestern Association. Playing under manager Ned Pettigrew, Bartlesville ended the season with a regular season record 63–78, placing fifth overall. Finishing 20.0 games behind the Muskogee Mets in the eight–team league and did not qualify for the playoff, won by Sapulpa over Muskogee, as the league played a split season schedule.

Following the 1922 season, Ned Pettigrew became the manager of the Cushing Refiners in 1923. With Cushing, Pettigrew gave a tryout to a 20 year old pitcher Carl Hubbell, who hadn't played baseball since graduating from high school. Pettigrew signed Hubbell to the Cushing roster and Hubbell began a Baseball Hall of Fame pitching career.

Continuing play in the 1923 Class C level Southwestern League, the Bartlesville "Bobcats" placed fourth in the regular season standings. With a final record of 68–66, the Bobcats played the season under manager Ted Waring. Bartlesville finished 14.5 games behind the first place Hutchinson Wheat Shockers. In the split season schedule, Bartlesville did not qualify for the playoff, won by Coffeyville, who swept Hutchinson in four games. After the season, the Southwestern League returned only three of the eight franchises in 1924, adding five new franchises to the 1924 league without Bartlesville included.

=== 1924 Western Association - two teams ===
Continuing minor league play in 1924, Bartlesville hosted two separate teams in the eight-team Class C level Western Association. To begin the season, the Bartlesville Bearcats joined the Fort Smith Twins, Hutchinson Wheat Shockers, Joplin Miners, Muskogee Athletics, Okmulgee Drillers, Springfield Midgets and Topeka Senators in the league.

On May 3, 1924, the Bartlesville Bearcats defeated Fort Smith 12–3 in a home game at Bartlesville.

The Bartlesville Bearcats began the season playing in the new league before the team relocated during the season. On June 8, 1924, the Bartlesville Bearcats, with a record of 19–23, moved to Ardmore, Oklahoma, where they team became the Ardmore Bearcats. The Bearcats compiled a record of 56–59 while based in Ardmore.

Bartlesville regained a league franchise in a short period of time. One week later, On June 16, 1924, the Joplin Miners of the Western Association relocated to Bartlesville, with a record of 25–24. In Bartlesville, the team was known as the "Boosters" and compiled a 44–63 record. The Joplin/Bartlesville team ended the season with an overall record of 69–87. Tom Toland managed the team, which finished in sixth place, 39.5 games behind the first place Okmulgee Drillers.

The Bartlesville/Ardmore team ended the season in fifth place, 34.5 games behind Okmulgee. The team had a 75–82 final record and played under managers Ted Waring, Ernie Smith and Frank Matthews.

Bartlesville did not return to the 1925 Western Association as the team folded and the league reduced from eight teams to six teams for the 1925 season.

Bartlesville next hosted minor league play in 1931, when the Bartlesville Broncos returned to the league and became members of the six team, Class C level Western Association.

== The ballpark ==
The Bartlesville minor league teams hosted home Southwestern League and Western Association at Johnstone Park. The "baseball park" had grandstand and bleacher sections along both base lines. Today, within the park, Park Drive runs through the former grandstand location. Today, Johnstone Park is still in use as a public park. The location is 100 North Cherokee Avenue in Bartlesville, Oklahoma.

== Timeline ==
Year(s)	# Yrs.	Team	Level	League	Ballpark
1921	1	Bartlesville Braves	Class D	Southwestern League	Johnstone Park
1922	1	Bartlesville Grays	Class C	Southwestern League	Johnstone Park
1923	1	Bartlesville Bearcats	Class C	Southwestern League	Johnstone Park
1924 (1)	1	Bartlesville Bearcats	Class C	Western Association	Johnstone Park
1924 (2)	1	Bartlesville Boosters	Class C	Western Association	Johnstone Park

== Season–by–season records ==
Year	Record	Win %	Manager	Finish	Playoffs/Notes
1921	64–80	.444	John McCloskey / Ad Lindsey	6th	No playoffs held
1922	63–72	.467	Ned Pettigrew	5th	Did not qualify
1923	68–66	.507	Ted Waring	4th	Did not qualify
1924 (1)	75–82	.442	Ted Waring / Ernie Smith / Frank Matthews	5th	Team (19–23) moved to Ardmore June 8.
1924 (2)	69–87	.442	Tom Toland	6th	Joplin (25–24) moved Bartlesville June 16.

== Notable alumni ==
- Moose Clabaugh (1924)
- John Fitzpatrick (1924)
- Joe Heving (1923)
- Smead Jolley (1924)
- Dutch Kemner (1924)
- John McCloskey (1921, MGR)
- Jimmy Moore (1924)
- Oran O'Neal (1922)
- Ned Pettigrew (1922, MGR)
- Ernie Smith (1924, MGR)
- Frank Thompson (1924)

== See also ==
- Bartlesville Grays players
- Bartlesville Boosters players
- Bartlesville Bearcats players
