= Bartlesville Reds =

- 1934–1935; (1931–1938); Bartlesville, Oklahoma

Minor league affiliations
- Class: Class C (1931–1932); Class A (1933); Class C (1934–1938)
- League: Western Association (1931–1932); Western League (1933); Western Association (1934–1938)

Major league affiliations
- Team: Detroit Tigers (1933); Cincinnati Reds (1934–1935); New York Yankees (1937)

Minor league titles
- League titles (0): None
- Conference titles (1): 1932
- Wild card berths (0): None

Team data
- Name: Bartlesville Broncos (1931–1932); Bartlesville Broncs (1933); Bartlesville Reds (1934–1935); Bartlesville Bucs (1936); Bartlesville Blues (1937); Bartlesville Chiefs (1938)
- Ballpark: Bartlesville Municipal Athletic Field (1931–1938)

The Bartlesville Reds were a minor league baseball team based in Bartlesville, Oklahoma.

From 1931 to 1938, Bartlesville teams played as a member of the Class C level Western Association, with one partial season by the Bartlesville "Tigers" in the 1933 Western League, playing as a Detroit Tigers minor league affiliate.

The Bartlesville "Reds" were a minor league affiliate of the Cincinnati Reds in 1934 and 1935 and the Bartlesville "Blues" were a New York Yankees affiliate in 1937.

Playing under six nicknames in eight seasons, Bartlesville hosted minor league home games at Bartlesville Municipal Athletic Field, known today as Bill Doenges Memorial Stadium.

== History ==
=== 1931 & 1932 Western Association ===
Minor league baseball began in Bartlesville, Oklahoma with the 1906 Bartlesville "Indians," who played the season as members of the Class D level Kansas State League. The 1923 Bartlesville Bearcats preceded the Western Association teams in playing the season as members of the Southwestern League.

In 1931, minor league play returned to Bartlesville, when the Bartlesville "Broncos" became members of the six team, Class C level Western Association. The Fort Smith Twins, Independence Producers, Joplin Miners, Muskogee Chiefs and Springfield Red Wings teams joined Bartlesville in league play.

In their first season of play, the 1931 Bartlesville Broncos finished last in the Western Association. With a 59–91 record in the regular season, Bartlesville ended the season in sixth place. The Broncos finished 31.0 games behind the first place Springfield Red Wings, while playing the season under manager Art Ewoldt.

The 1932 Western Association last two teams during the season, as Independence Producers and Topeka Jayhawks teams folded on July 18, leaving the league with four teams. The Bartlesville Broncos won the league's second half title and lost in the playoffs, as the league adopted a split-season schedule. The Broncos finished with a 77–53 overall record, placing second in the league standings, playing under returning manager Art Ewoldt and Art Schmidt. Bartlesville finished 2.0 games behind the first place Springfield Red Wings, who also won the first half title. In the league final, Springfield defeated Bartlesville 5 games to 4 to capture the championship.

Ival Goodman of Bartlesville led the 1932 Western Association with both 22 home runs and 130 RBI, while Johnny Rizzo had 172 total hits and Eldon Breese scored 119 runs to lead the league. Broncos' pitcher Keith Frazier led the league with 20 wins and 172 strikeouts.

=== 1933 Western League ===
The Western Association did not return to play in 1933 and Bartlesville began the season without a minor league team, before gaining one during the season. On July 7, 1933, the Hutchinson Wheat Shockers, of the Class A level Western League, relocated to Bartlesville with a record of 25–32. The team was a minor league affiliate of the Detroit Tigers. In the era, Class A was the highest level of minor leagues. The team finished the season playing as the Bartlesville "Broncs" and did not qualify for the playoffs. After compiling a 26–38 record, while based in Bartlesville, the Hutchinson / Bartlesville team ended the season in seventh place with an overall record of 51–70. The team ended the season 26.5 games behind the first place Des Moines Demons in the final league standings.

=== 1934 to 1938 Western Association ===
The Western Association returned to play in 1934 as a six-team Class C level league. The Hutchinson Larks, Joplin Miners, Muskogee Tigers, Ponca City Angels and Springfield Red Wings teams joined Bartlesville in resuming league play. The Bartlesville "Reds" rejoined the league, playing as a minor league affiliate of the Cincinnati Reds with Marty Purtell returning as the Bartlesville manager. The Reds did not qualify for the Western Association playoffs in 1934, with a fifth-place finish. Bartlesville ended the season with a 63–69 record, finishing 12.0 games behind first place Springfield.

In 1935, the Bartlesville Reds continued Western Association play as a Cincinnati Reds affiliate, playing under returning manager Marty Purtell. The Bartlesville Reds finished the regular season in seventh place with a 56–79 record, ending the season 31.0 games behind first place Springfield Red Wings. Bartlesville did not qualify for the playoff won by Ponca City. Harry Hughes of Bartlesville led the Western Association with 135 runs RBI, while teammate Morris Young led the league with a 2.31 ERA.

The 1936 Bartlesville "Bucs" did not qualify for the Western Association playoff, finishing the regular season in last place. The Bucs ended the season with a 53–89 record in the regular season, playing under manager Bob Morrow. Bartlesville finished 28.0 games behind the first place Ponca City Angels. Bartlesville was the only team in the six team Western Association without a major league affiliate.

The renamed Bartlesville "Blues" became a minor league affiliate of the New York Yankees in continuing Western Association league play in 1937. The Bartlesville "Blues" missed the four-team playoffs in 1937, as the Blues finished in last place. With a 45–98 record playing under managers Dick Goldberg and Wes Kingdon, Bartlesville finished 35.5 games behind the first Muskogee Reds while placing sixth in the six–team league.

Bartlesville played their final Western Association league season in 1938, changing their nickname to the "Chiefs." The 1938 Bartlesville Chiefs ended the Western Association regular season in seventh place in the eight-team league with a 61–78 record, playing the season under managers Cobe Jones and Mickey Duggan. The Chiefs ended the regular season 23.5 games behind the first place Ponca City Angels in the final standings. Bartlesville did not qualify for the four-team playoff won by Ponca City.

The Western Association continued play in 1939 without a Bartlesville franchise. Bartlesville next hosted minor league baseball when the 1946 Bartlesville Oilers began a tenure as members of the Kansas-Oklahoma-Missouri League.

== The ballpark ==
The Bartlesville minor league teams hosted home games at the site known as Bartlesville Municipal Athletic Field in the era and Bill Doenges Memorial Stadium today. With a construction cost of $30,000, the ballpark was opened at the dedication on May 2, 1932. The ballpark was first known as the Bartlesville Municipal Athletic Field until being renamed to "Bill Doenges Memorial Stadium" in 1997. In the era, the ballpark was stadium was known to be the only professional ballpark in the world with the same distance (340 feet) to the fence anywhere in fair territory. The outfield fence has 14 feet concrete panels. Still in use today, the Bill Doenges Memorial Stadium is located at 198 North Dewey Avenue in Bartlesville, Oklahoma.

== Timeline ==
Year(s)	# Yrs.	Team	Level	League	Affiliate	Ballpark
1931–1932	2	Bartlesville Broncos	Class C	Western Association	None	Bartlesville Municipal Athletic Field (Bill Doenges Memorial Stadium)
1933	1	Bartlesville Broncs	Class A	Western League	Detroit Tigers	Bartlesville Municipal Athletic Field (Bill Doenges Memorial Stadium)
1934–1935	2	Bartlesville Reds	Class C	Western Association	Cincinnati Reds	Bartlesville Municipal Athletic Field (Bill Doenges Memorial Stadium)
1936	1	Bartlesville Bucs	Class C	Western Association	None	Bartlesville Municipal Athletic Field (Bill Doenges Memorial Stadium)
1937	1	Bartlesville Blues	Class C	Western Association	New York Yankees	Bartlesville Municipal Athletic Field (Bill Doenges Memorial Stadium)
1938	1	Bartlesville Chiefs	Class C	Western Association	None	Bartlesville Municipal Athletic Field (Bill Doenges Memorial Stadium)

== Year–by–year records ==
Year	Record	Finish	Manager	Playoffs/notes
1931	59–91	6th	Art Ewoldt	No playoffs held
1932	77–33	2nd	Art Ewoldt / Art Schmidt	Won second half pennant Lost in finals
1933	51–70	7th	Marty Purtell	Hutchinson (25–32) moved to Bartlesville July 7 Did not qualify
1934	63–69	5th	Marty Purtell	Did not qualify
1935	56–79	5th	Marty Purtell	Did not qualify
1936	53–89	6th	Bob Morrow	Did not qualify
1937	45–98	6th	Dick Goldberg / Wes Kingdon	Did not qualify
1938	61–780	7th	Cobe Jones / Mickey Duggan	Did not qualify

== Notable alumni ==
- Dusty Boggess (1932)
- Dud Branom (1934)
- Harry Brecheen (1936) St. Louis Cardinals Hall of Fame
- Sig Broskie (1931)
- Rex Cecil (1938)
- Vallie Eaves (1936)
- Art Ewoldt (1931–1932, MGR)
- Ival Goodman (1932)
- Paul Hinson (1932)
- Hank Hulvey (1938)
- Cobe Jones (1938, MGR)
- Ike Kahdot (1933-1935)
- Wes Kingdon (1937, MGR)
- Maury Newlin (1938)
- Red Phillips (1933, MGR)
- Woody Pitzer (1935-1936)
- Marty Purtell (1933–1935, MGR)
- Art Rebel (1936)
- Jack Redmond (1931)
- Herman Reich (1936)
- Johnny Rizzo (1932)
- Fuzz White (1938)
- Jim Winford (1931)

== See also ==
- Bartlesville Broncos players
- Bartlesville Bucs players
- Bartlesville Chiefs players
- Bartlesville Reds players
