= Hutchinson Salt Packers =

- 1906–1911; (1905–1911, 1914); Hutchinson, Kansas

Minor league affiliations
- Class: Class D (1905); Class C (1906–1908); Class D (1909–1911, 1914)
- League: Kansas State League (1905); Western Association (1906-1908); Kansas State League (1909–1911, 1914)

Major league affiliations
- Team: None

Minor league titles
- League titles (1): 1910

Team data
- Name: Hutchinson Salt Miners (1905); Hutchinson Salt Packers (1906–1911); Hutchison Packers (1914)
- Ballpark: Cook Athletic Park (1905-1910); Gano Park (1911, 1914)

The Hutchinson Salt Packers were a minor league baseball team based in Hutchinson, Kansas.

Hutchinson played as members of the Class D level Kansas State League three in three different tenures: in 1905, from 1909 to 1911 and in 1914, winning the 1910 league championship. In between Kansas State League membership, the Salt Packers played as a member of the Class C level Western Association from 1906 to 1909. The team nicknames correspond with the Salt mining industry in the region in the era.

Hutchinson teams first hosted minor league games at Cook Athletic Park, which was destroyed by fire in 1910 and replaced in 1911 by Gano Park.

== History ==
=== 1905-1909: Kansas State League / Western Association ===
Minor league baseball in Hutchinson, Kansas began with the 1888 "Hutchinson" team, who played the season as members of the six–team independent level Western League.

In 1905, minor league play returned when the Hutchinson "Salt Miners" became charter members of the six–team Class D level Kansas State League. The Salt Miners finished the 1905 season with a record of 22–24 to place fourth, playing the season under managers R.F.Cook and Fred Abbott. Hutchinson finished 4.5 games behind first place Ellsworth in the final standings. Hutchinson briefly folded following the 1905 season.

After beginning the 1906 season without a minor league team, the Hutchinson "Salt Packers" joined the eight-team, Class C level Western Association during the season. On June 12, 1906, the St. Joseph Packers franchise relocated to Hutchinson with a record of 16–24 in league play. After compiling a record of 39–60 record while based in Hutchinson, the St. Joseph/Hutchinson team finished in eighth place with a 55-84 overall record in the Western Association. Frank Genins, Spencer Abbott and Fred Hurlburt served as managers between the two locations. In the final standings, the Salt Packers finished 27.5 games behind the first place Topeka White Sox. Thomas Campbell led the league with 9 home runs.

Salt mining has been an industry in the region since the mid-1800s corresponding to the team nicknames of the era. In the era, Hutchinson was home to a Morton Salt plant in the south side of the city. The plant laid claim as the largest salt facility in the world. Since 2007, Hutchinson has been home to the Strataca underground salt museum in tribute to the natural history and industry of salt mining.

Hutchinson continued play in the eight-team Class C level Western Association in 1907. The Joplin Miners, Leavenworth Convicts, Oklahoma City Mets, Springfield Midgets, Topeka White Sox, Webb City Goldbugs and Wichita Jobbers teams joined the Salt Packers in beginning league play on May 2, 1907.

Playing the 1907 season under manager Doc Andrews, the Salt Packers placed third in the final Western Association league standings, playing the season under manager Doc Andrews. With a 77–59 record, Hutchinson ended the season 22.5 games behind first place Wichita Jobbers, who finished with a 98–35 record.

In 1907, pitcher Smoky Joe Wood was sold after playing two seasons with Hutchinson. Originally an infielder with the team, Wood was moved to pitcher by manager Doc Andrews. George Tebeau, owner of the Kansas City Blues purchased Wood's contract for $3,500. Smoky Joe Wood was depicted as a character in the 1989 movie Field of Dreams.

The 1908 Hutchinson Salt Packers placed fifth in the eight-team league in their final season of Western Association play. The Salt Packers ended the season with a record of 69–70. The returning Doc Andrews and Frank Barber served as managers as Hutchinson finished 20.0 games behind first place Topeka White Sox in the final standings.

=== 1909-1911, 1914: Kansas State League ===
In 1909, minor league baseball continued as the Hutchinson Salt Packers became members of the reformed eight–team Class D level Kansas State League. The Arkansas City-Winfield Twins, Great Bend Millers, Lyons Lions, McPherson Merry Macks, Newton Railroaders, Strong City-Cottonwood Falls Twin Cities and Wellington Dukes teams joined Hutchinson as 1909 league members.

After resuming minor league play, the Salt Packers placed a close second in the Kansas State League standings. Hutchinson ended the 1909 season with a record of 60–37, playing under manager Bill Zink in the Kansas State League play. The Salt Packers finished just 0.5 game behind the first place Lyons Lions in the final standings. Pitcher Pearl Stanley of Hutchinson led with league with a 23–6 record.

The Hutchinson Salt Packers captured the 1910 Kansas State League championship in the eight-team league. The Salt Packers placed first in the Kansas State League standings. Hutchinson finished the 1910 season with a record of 70–39. The Salt Packers finished 11.0 games ahead of the second place McPherson Merry Macks in the final standings. Bill Zink served as player/manager in 1910, leading the league with 141 total hits, while teammate E.J. Smith led the league pitchers with 18 wins.

The 1911 Hutchinson Salt Packers continued Kansas State League play in a shortened season. The league disbanded on July 5, 1911, due to crop failures and drought. At the time the league folded, Hutchinson was in fifth place with a 29–29 record behind returning manager Bill Zink. When the league ceased play, the Salt Packers were 9.5 games behind the first place Great Bend Millers in the shortened season standings.

Hutchinson returned to minor league play in 1914, with the Hutchinson "Packers" rejoining the Kansas State League for a final season in the league. The Kansas State League reduced teams and played as a four–team league in its final season in 1914. Hutchinson ended the season with a record of 40–49, finishing in third place. Managed by Jesse Clifton, the Packers finished 15.5 games behind the first place Emporia Bidwells in the final standings.

=== 1918 partial season ===
The Salt Packers were succeeded in minor league play by the 1917 Hutchinson Wheat Shockers, who began play as members of the Class A level Western League. In 1918, a final Hutchinson "Salt Packers" team played a partial season in the Western League, when the Topeka Kaw-nees relocated to Hutchinson weeks before the league folded. Topeka relocated to Hutchinson on June 9, 1918, before the league folded on July 7, 1918, due to World War I.

Baseball Hall of Fame member Jesse Haines pitched for the 1918 Salt Packers at age 24. After compiling a 12–4 record with Topeka/Hutchinson, Haines made his major league debut with the Cincinnati Reds on July 20, 1918, after the team and Western League had folded.

In 1922, the Hutchinson Wheat Shockers resumed minor league play as members of the Class C level Southwestern League.

== The ballparks ==
From 1905 to 1910, Hutchinson hosted home minor league games at the Cook Athletic Park. The ballpark burned down in 1910. The ballpark was also called the "Hutchinson Athletic Park" and opened in 1905, when W.F. Cook managed the Hutchinson team. It was located at Avenue C & Adams in Hutchinson. Today, the site is home to a seed and supply facility.

The Hutchinson home minor league ballpark in 1911 and 1914 was Gano Park, which hosted minor league teams at the ballpark through 1924. The ballpark was located at the site of today's Carey Park. Today, Carey Park remains home to the Hobart-Detter Field ballpark. Carey Park is located at 1600 Carey Park Boulevard in Hutchinson, Kansas.

== Timeline ==
Year(s)	# Yrs.	Team	Level	League	Ballpark
1905	1	Hutchinson Salt Miners	Class D	Kansas State League	Cook Athletic Park
1906–1908	3	Hutchinson Salt Packers	Class C	Western Association	Cook Athletic Park
1909-1910	2	Hutchinson Salt Packers	Class D	Kansas State League	Cook Athletic Park
1911	1	Hutchinson Salt Packers	Class D	Kansas State League	Gano Park
1914	1	Hutchinson Packers	Class D	Kansas State League	Gano Park

== Year–by–year records ==
Year	Record	Finish	Manager	Playoffs/Notes
1905	22–24	4th	Fred Abbott / R.F. Cook	No playoffs held
1906	55-84	8th	Frank Genins / Spencer Abbott; Fred Hurlburt	St. Joseph (16-24) moved to Hutchinson June 12. No playoffs held
1907	77-59	3rd	Doc Andrews	No playoffs held
1908	69-70	5th	Doc Andrews / Frank Barber	No playoffs held
1909	60–37	2nd	Bill Zink	No playoffs held
1910	70–39	1st	Bill Zink	League champions No playoffs held
1911	29–29	5th	Bill Zink	League folded July 5
1914	40–49	3rd	Jesse Clifton	No playoffs held

== Notable alumni ==
- Jesse Haines (1918) Inducted Baseball Hall of Fame, 1970
- Raleigh Aitchison (1907)
- James Durham (1905)
- Frank Genins (1906, MGR)
- George Gillpatrick (1906)
- Arthur Hauger (1918)
- Ben Hunt (1909)
- Bill Kemmer (1906)
- Rudy Kling (1906)
- Benny Meyer (1918)
- Ned Pettigrew (1906-1907)
- Andy Rush (1914)
- Frosty Thomas (1906)
- Tony Tonneman (1907)
- Smoky Joe Wood (1906-1907) Boston Red Sox Hall of Fame

== See also ==
- Hutchinson Salt Packers players
- Hutchinson Salt Miners players
- Hutchinson Packers players
