= Muskogee, Oklahoma minor league baseball history =

Muskogee, Oklahoma minor league teams
- 1905–1957; (1905–1912, 1914–1917, 1921–1942, 1946–1957); Muskogee, Oklahoma

Minor league affiliations
- Class: Class C (1905); Class D (1906–1908); Class C (1909–1910); Class D (1911–1912, 1914–1917, 1921); Class C (1922–1931, 1934–1942, 1946–1954); Class D (1955–1957)
- League: Missouri Valley League (1905); South Central League (1906); Oklahoma-Arkansas-Kansas League (1907–1908); Western Association (1909–1911); Oklahoma State League (1912); Western Association (1914–1916–1917); Southwestern League (1921–1923); Western Association (1924–1932); Western League (1933); Western Association (1934–1942, 1946–1954); Sooner State League (1955–1957)

Major league affiliations
- Team: St. Louis Browns (1932); New York Giants (1936); Cincinnati Reds (1937–1939); Chicago Cubs (1941); Detroit Tigers (1946); St. Louis Browns (1947–1949); New York Giants (1951–1957)

Minor league titles
- League titles (0): None
- Conference titles (1): 1922
- Wild card berths (10): 1914; 1915; 1925; 1937; 1940; 1947; 1952; 1954; 1955; 1957

Team data
- Name: Muskogee Reds (1905); Muskogee Indians (1906); Muskogee Redskins (1907–1908); Muskogee Navigators (1909–1910); Muskogee Redskins (1911); Muskogee Indians (1912); Muskogee Mets (1914–1916); Muskogee Reds (1917); Muskogee Mets (1921–1923); Muskogee Athletics (1924–1926); Muskogee Chiefs (1927–1932); Muskogee Oilers (1933); Muskogee Tigers (1934–1936); Muskogee Reds (1937–1942, 1946–1950); Muskogee Giants (1951–1957)
- Ballpark: Benson Park (1905–1909); Pioneer Park (1908–1910); Athletic Park I (1910–1911); Owen Field/League Park/Athletic Park (1911–1957)

Minor league baseball teams were based in Muskogee, Oklahoma in various seasons between 1905 and 1957. The final team, the Muskogee Giants, played as members of the Western Association (1951–1954) and the Sooner State League (1955–1957). Earlier Muskogee teams played as members of the Missouri Valley League (1905), South Central League (1906), Oklahoma-Arkansas-Kansas League (1907–1908), Western Association (1909–1911), Oklahoma State League (1912), Western Association (1914, 1916–1917), Southwestern League (1921–1923), Western Association (1924–1932), Western League (1933), Western Association (1934–1942, 1946–1954) and Sooner State League (1955–1957). Muskogee never captured a league championship, making league finals on multiple occasions.

Muskogee teams played as a minor league affiliate of the St. Louis Browns in 1932, New York Giants in 1936, Cincinnati Reds from 1937 to 1939, Chicago Cubs in 1941, Detroit Tigers in 1946, St. Louis Browns from 1947 to 1949 and New York Giants from 1951 to 1957.

Three Baseball Hall of Fame inductees played for Muskogee. Bill Dickey played for the 1926 Muskogee Athletics. Bobby Wallace played for the 1921 Muskogee Mets, as a player/manager. Rube Marquard managed and pitched for the 1933 Muskogee Oilers.

== History ==
Professional baseball began in Muskogee in 1905, with the Muskogee Reds playing as a member of the Missouri Valley League. The Muskogee Redskins played as members of the Oklahoma-Arkansas-Kansas League (1907), Oklahoma-Kansas League (1908) and the Western Association (1911). In 1910, the Muskogee Navigators, playing in the Western Association, disbanded on July 22, 1910. The Muskogee Indians folded, along with the entire league, when the Oklahoma State League disbanded on June 29, 1912.

The Muskogee Mets lost in the league finals in 1914, 1915 and 1922. Baseball Hall of Fame inductee Bobby Wallace was a player/manager for the Muskogee Mets in 1921, hitting .368 in 13 games at age 47.

The Muskogee Athletics lost in the 1925 Western Association league finals. Baseball Hall of Fame member Bill Dickey played for the Muskogee Athletics in 1926, hitting .283 with 7 home runs in 61 games at age 19. 1931 World Series Champion St. Louis Cardinals Manager Gabby Street managed the Athletics for the 1924 and 1925 seasons. Owned by local drugstore operator Joe Magoto, the Athletics disbanded on July 18, 1926. Magoto later owned the Muskogee Reds.

The Muskogee Chiefs moved to Maud, Oklahoma on August 29, 1929, to complete their season as the Maud Chiefs. They returned to Muskogee in 1930. On June 8, 1932, Muskogee moved to Hutchinson, Kansas to become the Hutchinson Wheat Shockers, playing in the Western League. However, the Fort Smith Twins of the Western Association moved to Muskogee on July 1, 1932, to complete their season as the Muskogee Chiefs. The second 1932 Muskogee Chiefs were an affiliate of the St. Louis Browns. Notably, The second 1932 Muskogee Chiefs traded George Hubbell to their old team, the Hutchinson Wheat Shockers, in exchange for four new baseballs.

The Davenport Blue Sox replaced Muskogee in the Western Association in 1933. However, the Muskogee Oilers rejoined the Western League when the Wichita Oilers moved to Muskogee on June 6, 1933. Baseball Hall of Fame member Rube Marquard managed and pitched for the 1933 Oilers at age 46.

The Muskogee Tigers were minor league affiliates of the New York Giants in 1936.

The Muskogee Reds lost in the 1947 Western Association League finals. The Reds were affiliates of the Cincinnati Reds (1937–1939), Chicago Cubs (1941), Detroit Tigers (1946) and St. Louis Browns (1947–1949).

The Muskogee Giants were members of the Western Association from 1951 to 1954 and the Sooner State League from 1955 to 1957. The Giants were a minor league affiliate of the New York Giants (1951–1957) and lost in the league finals in 1952 and 1955. Muskogee folded when the Sooner State League permanently folded after the 1957 season.

== The ballparks ==
The earliest Muskogee teams played at Benson Park. Named after two of the three principal investors in Muskogee's streetcar system, Benson Park was located near the end of streetcar line that ran down South 21st Street. Early maps show the exact location as a block bounded by Garrett Street (now 22nd Street) on the east, Virginia Avenue (now Maryland Avenue) on the north, and Border Avenue on the south.

In 1908, the Muskogee Redskins began to play most of their schedule at Pioneer Park. Sunday games were still held at Benson Park, which was outside city limits and thus not subject to municipal restrictions on Sunday play. Pioneer Park was located at the intersection of Fourth and Court Streets in downtown Muskogee. Although Pioneer Park's central location was considered a plus, the viability of this arrangement was regularly threatened by ongoing disputes between the team and the ballpark owners. Nonetheless, the Muskogee Navigators continued to play games at Pioneer Park through 1909.

In 1910, the continuing difficulties with Pioneer Park's ownership prompted the construction of a new ballpark on the east side of Muskogee. This new facility, called Athletic Park (not to be confused with the latter ballpark of the same name in downtown Muskogee), was located immediately to the east of the car barn for the streetcar system, which maps show to be located where North Street crosses the St. Louis and San Francisco Railway line on the way east toward Green Hill Cemetery. The car barn was immediately adjacent to the Hyde Park streetcar line, providing access for fans attending games there. Athletic Park ultimately was limited to hosting Sunday games after a deal was struck to hold weekday games in 1910 at Pioneer Park. Because of its location outside city limits, Sunday games continued to be held at Athletic Park through at least 1911.

Each of these early Muskogee baseball venues had significant drawbacks. Athletic Park "could not be excelled" as a facility, but many felt it was too far from the city center. Benson Park not only had a remote location, but also had taken the name Dean Park after the African-American neighborhood now surrounding it and was by that time used largely by "colored teams." Pioneer Park had a central location, but after the lease expired the owners sold the land and it was developed for other purposes. Beginning in 1911, therefore, Muskogee teams started playing weekday games at Owen Field, which was located near 5th Street and Boston Street. Owen Field was named after landowner Robert Owen, whose home was on the property that adjoined the ball field. Although the open space at Owen Field had previously been used for other community events, it initially had significant drawbacks as a baseball field, including an alley running through the middle of the field. There was also significant opposition from neighboring residents. Gradually, however, the alley was closed and telephone poles and other structures that interfered with play were removed. By the 1926 season, the last remaining structure on the block, a house at 4th and Boston, had been removed. The grandstand and bleachers were moved northward to the corner of 5th and Boston to take advantage of this additional space.

Later, the Owen Field property became known as League Park and Athletic Park. From 1921 to 1926 Muskogee teams played at the site, renamed League Park. Beginning in 1934, the site was renamed Athletic Park and hosted the Muskogee Tigers, Muskogee Reds and Muskogee Giants. The ballpark had a capacity of 4,500 (1939); 6,000 (1940); 2,400 (1936) and 3,500 (1950). It had dimensions (Left, Center, Right) of 298-415-334 (1939) and 300-385-334 (1940). Athletic Park was bounded by Boston Avenue to the north, Fifth Street to the west, Columbus Avenue to the south, and Fourth Street to the west.

In April 1923, the Brooklyn Dodgers and New York Yankees with Babe Ruth, played an exhibition game at Owen Field. Later, Mickey Mantle played for the Joplin Miners in games at Athletic Park in 1950.

Because of its location near Owen Field/Athletic Park, visiting teams stayed at the Severs Hotel.

Today, the site of Owen Field/Athletic Park is the location of the Muskogee Civic Center. The address is 425 Boston Street, Muskogee, Oklahoma.

== Notable alumni ==
=== Baseball Hall of Fame alumni ===
- Bill Dickey (1926), inducted 1954
- Rube Marquard (1933), inducted 1971
- Bobby Wallace (1921), inducted, 1953

=== Notable alumni ===
- Red Barrett (1937), major league All-Star
- Herschel Bennett (1921)
- Arnold Carter (1942)
- Pug Cavet (1090)
- Mort Cooper (1933), four-time major league All-Star; St. Louis Cardinals Hall of Fame
- Dick Crutcher (1909)
- Guy Curtright (1934)
- Bill Fleming (1936)
- Tony Freitas (1934)
- Earl Grace (1926)
- Alex Kellner (1942), major league All-Star
- Sherman Jones (1953)
- Chad Kimsey (1927)
- Ray Lamanno (1938–1939), major league All-Star
- Heinie Mueller (1949–1950, MGR)
- Bob Perry (1956)
- Rip Radcliff (1929) major league All-Star
- Willie Ramsdell (1942)
- Paul Richards (1928), Baltimore Orioles Hall of Fame
- Wally Schang (1935)
- Gabby Street (1924–1925), manager of 1931 World Series Champion - St. Louis Cardinals
- Bob Swift (1928, 1934)
- Ben Tincup (1905, 1912, 1938)
- Lou Tost (1936)
- Johnny Weekly (1957)
- Ab Wright (1931, 1947)
- Dom Zanni (1953)
