= Miami Indians (baseball) =

- 1921; Miami, Oklahoma

Minor league affiliations
- Class: Class D (1921)
- League: Southwestern League (1921)

Major league affiliations
- Team: None

Minor league titles
- League titles (0): None

Team data
- Name: Miami Indians (1921)
- Ballpark: League Park (1921)

The Miami Indians were a minor league baseball team based in Miami, Oklahoma. In 1921, the Indians played the season as charter members of the Class D level Southwestern League, finishing in seventh place. The Indians were succeeded in minor league play by the 1946 Miami Blues of the Kansas-Oklahoma-Missouri League.

== History ==
Beginning minor league play in 1921, the Miami "Indians" became a charter member of the eight team, Class D level Southwestern League. The Bartlesville Braves, Coffeyville Refiners, Independence Producers, Muskogee Mets, Parsons Parsons, Pittsburg Pirates and Sapulpa Sappers teams joined Miami in beginning league play on April 21, 1921.

The "Indians" nickname corresponds with local and regional history. The city of Miami was founded in 1891 and is named for the Miami Tribe of Oklahoma, with the city still serving today as the capital of the federally recognized Miami Tribe of Oklahoma.

The president of the Miami Indians franchise was former major league player Benny Meyer. Meyer gained control of the team in March 1921 with no players on the roster. He put ads for players in The Sporting News and held a tryout at Robison Field in St. Louis, Missouri, where over 30 players showed up. Meyer left the team during the season to become a minor league scout.

At the Indians' opening day at Miami Field on April 27, 1921, there were 2,500 in attendance at the 2,000-seat ballpark. The game against Muskogee was preceded by a luncheon for the team and a parade leading to the ballpark.

In their first season of play in the league, the Miami Indians placed seventh. With a record of 59–84, playing the season under the direction of manager Bobby Byrne, Miami finished 43.5 games behind the first place Independence Producers (103–38), who finished 19.0 games ahead of the second place Muskogee Mets. The 1921 final standings featured the Independence Producers, followed by the Muskogee Mets (93–56), Pittsburg Pirates (87–63), Coffeyville Refiners (71–72), Sapulpa Sappers (68–76), Bartlesville Braves (64–80), Miami Indians (59–84) and Parsons Parsons / Cushing Oilers (34–110).

Miami players Ray Flaskamper and Bill Walker advanced to play major league baseball. Invited by Benny Meyer, Walker was discovered by scouts at a tryout at Sportsman's Park in St. Louis in 1921. After the tryout, Walker was put under contract and assigned to play for Miami at age 17. Walker later won the National League ERA title in 1929 and 1931, making the 1935 All-Star team. Miami player/manager Bobby Byrne had previously played eleven seasons in the major leagues.

In 1922, the Southwestern League became a Class C level League, however the Miami franchise did not return to league play. Miami next hosted minor league baseball with the 1946 Miami Blues, an affiliate of the Brooklyn Dodgers, began a seven-year stretch as members of the Class D level Kansas-Oklahoma-Missouri League.

== The ballpark ==
The Miami Indians played 1921 home minor league games at League Park. League Park was located on North Main Street, within walking distance of the intersection of Main and Central in the middle of downtown. Based on later maps, the precise location of this ball park appears to have been the northeast corner of Main Street and Third Avenue NE. No remnants of the former ballpark currently exist.

== Season–by–season record ==
| Year | Record | Manager | Finish | Playoffs/Notes |
|---|---|---|---|---|
| 1921 | 59–84 | Bobby Byrne | 7th | No playoffs held |

== Notable alumni ==
- Bobby Byrne (1921, MGR)
- Ray Flaskamper (1921)
- Benny Meyer (1921, team president)
- Bill Walker (1921) MLB All-Star

== See also ==
- Miami Indians players
