= Western Association =

Minor US professional baseball leagues

- Most recent season or competition: 1954 Western Association season
- Sport: Minor league baseball
- Founded: 1888
- First season: 1888
- Folded: 1954
- President: Samuel Morton (1888); J.S. McCormick (1889–1890); L.C. Krauthoff (1890, 1893); Robert Scott (1893); Dave Rowe (1894); W.W. Kent (1894–1895); Thomas Hickey (1896–1899); William Myer (1901)
- No. of teams: 75
- Country: United States
- Continent: North America
- Most titles: Springfield / Fort Smith (6)

The Western Association was the name of five different leagues formed in American minor league baseball during the 19th and 20th centuries.

The oldest league, originally established as the Northwestern League in 1883, was refounded as the Western Association on October 28, 1887. It began operations in the 1888 season and lasted through the 1891 season.

A separate Western Association was formed in January 1894 with clubs in Iowa, Nebraska, Illinois and Missouri – with a team in faraway Denver, Colorado, added in 1895. This league ceased operations in 1898, but was revived again for the following season. It was renamed the Central League in 1900. In 1901, two leagues were called the Western Association. One had eight teams in Ohio, Michigan, Kentucky, West Virginia, and Indiana; it folded after only one year. The other loop, confusingly located in the same geographic area, was the former Interstate League; it reverted to its original identity in 1902.

The most long-lived Western Association played between 1905 and 1954. Originally the Missouri Valley League, it existed for 42 years during that half century, suspending operations during both world wars and for one season (1933) during the Great Depression. It was largely a Class C circuit, meaning it was a lower minor league, above only the Class D level.

== Cities represented ==
- Ardmore, OK: Ardmore Foundlings (1917); Ardmore Snappers 1923; Ardmore Bearcats 1924; Ardmore Boomers (1925–1926)
- Bartlesville, OK: Bartlesville Boosters (1909–1910); Bartlesville Bearcats (1924); Bartlesville Boosters (1924); Bartlesville Broncos (1931–1932); Bartlesville Reds (1934–1935); Bartlesville Bucs (1936); Bartlesville Blues (1937); Bartlesville Chiefs (1938)
- Blackwell, OK: Blackwell Broncos (1954)
- Bloomington, IL: Bloomington Blues (1899)
- Burlington, IA: Burlington Colts (1895–1897); Burlington Hawkeyes (1898)
- Carthage, MO: Carthage Browns (1941)
- Cedar Rapids, IA: Cedar Rapids Bunnies (1896–1899)
- Chicago, IL: Chicago Maroons (1888)
- Chickasha, OK: Chickasha Chicks (1920–1921)
- Coffeyville, KS: Coffeyville White Sox (1911)
- Columbus, OH: Columbus Senators (1901)
- Davenport, IA: Davenport Onion Weeders (1888)
- Dayton, OH: Dayton Veterans (1901)
- Denison, TX: Denison Railroaders (1915–1917)
- Denver, CO: Denver Grizzlies (1889–1890); Denver Mountaineers (1891); Denver (1895)
- Des Moines, IA: Des Moines Prohibitionists (1888–1890, 1894–1897)
- Drumright, OK: Drumright Drummers (1920); Drumright Oilers (1921)
- Duluth, MN: Duluth Whalebacks (1891)
- Dubuque, IA: Dubuque (1895–1899)
- El Reno, OK: El Reno Packers (1909–1910)
- Enid, OK: Enid Railroaders (1908–1910); Enid Harvesters (1920–1923); Enid Giants (1950); Enid Buffalos (1951)
- Fort Smith, AR: Fort Smith Scouts (1911); Fort Smith Twins (1914–1917, 1920–1932); Fort Smith Giants (1938–1942, 1946–1949); Fort Smith Indians (1951–1952)
- Fort Smith, AR & Van Buren, AR: Fort Smith-Van Buren Twins (1953)
- Fort Wayne, IN: Fort Wayne Railroaders (1901)
- Grand Rapids, MI: Grand Rapids Woodworkers (1901)
- Guthrie, OK: Guthrie Senators (1905, 1909–1910, 1914)
- Henryetta, OK: Henryetta Boosters (1914); Henryetta Hens (1920–1923)
- Hutchinson, KS: Hutchinson Salt Packers (1906–1908); Hutchinson Wheat Shockers (1924, 1932); Hutchinson Larks (1934–1938); Hutchinson Pirates (1939–1942); Hutchinson Cubs (1946–1948); Hutchinson Elks (1949–1954)
- Independence, KS: Independence Packers (1911); Independence Producers (1925, 1928–1932)
- Indianapolis, IN: Indianapolis Hoosiers (1901)
- Iola, KS: Iola Indians (1954)
- Jacksonville, IL: Jacksonville Jacks (1894); Jacksonville (1895)
- Joplin, MO: Joplin Miners 1905–1911, 1922–1924; Joplin Ozarks (1926); Joplin Miners (1927–1932, 1934–1942, 1946–1953); Joplin Cardinals (1954)
- Joplin, MO & Webb City, MO: Joplin-Webb City Miners (1914)
- Kansas City, MO: Kansas City Blues (1888; 1890–1891); Kansas City Cowboys (1893)
- Lawrence, KS: Lawrence Farmers (1893)
- Leavenworth, KS: Leavenworth Orioles (1905); Leavenworth Old Soldiers (1906); Leavenworth Convicts (1907); Leavenworth Braves (1946–1949)
- Lincoln, NE: Lincoln (1890); Lincoln Rustlers (1891); Lincoln Treeplanters (1894–1895)
- Louisville, KY: Louisville Colonels (1901)
- McAlester, OK: McAlester Miners (1914–1917, 1922); McAlester Diggers (1923); McAlester Miners (1926)
- Marion, OH: Marion (1901)
- Maud, OK: Maud Chiefs (1929)
- Milwaukee, WI: Milwaukee Brewers (1888, 1890–1891); Milwaukee Creams (1889)
- Minneapolis, MN: Minneapolis Millers (1888–1891)
- Muskogee, OK: Muskogee Navigators (1909–1910); Muskogee Redskins (1911); Muskogee Mets 1914–1916; Muskogee Reds (1917); Muskogee Athletics (1924–1926); Muskogee Chiefs (1927–1932); Muskogee Tigers (1934–1936); Muskogee Reds (1937–1942, 1946–1950); Muskogee Giants (1951–1954)
- Oklahoma City, OK: Oklahoma City Mets (1905–1908); Oklahoma City Boosters (1914); Oklahoma City Senators (1916); Oklahoma City Boosters (1917)
- Okmulgee, OK: Okmulgee Drillers (1920–1927)
- Omaha, NE: Omaha Omahogs (1888–1890); Omaha Lambs (1891); Omaha Omahogs (1894–1895)
- Ottumwa, IA: Ottumwa Giants (1898–1899)
- Paris, TX: Paris Red Snappers (1915); Paris Survivors (1916); Paris Athletics (1917)
- Pawhuska, OK: Pawhuska Huskers (1920–1921); Pawhuska Osages (1922)
- Peoria, IL: Peoria Distillers (1894–1896); Peoria Blackbirds (1897–1898)
- Pittsburg, KS: Pittsburg Pirates (1909)
- Ponca City, OK: Ponca City Angels (1934–1938); Ponca City Jets (1954)
- Quincy, IL: Quincy Ravens (1894–1895); Quincy Bluebirds (1896); Quincy Little Giants (1897); Quincy (1898–1899)
- Rock Island, IL & Moline, IL: Rock Island-Moline Islanders (1894, 1898–1899)
- Rockford, IL: Rockford Forest City 1895–1897; Rockford Roughriders (1899)
- Springfield, IL: Springfield (1895)
- St. Joseph, MO: St. Joseph Clay Eaters (1889); St. Joseph Saints (1893); St. Joseph Saints (1894–1898); St. Joseph Packers (1906); St. Joseph Saints (1927); St. Joseph Angels (1939); St. Joseph Saints (1940); St. Joseph Ponies (1941); St. Joseph Cardinals (1946–1951); St. Joseph Cardinals (1953); St. Joseph Saints (1954)
- St. Louis, MO: St. Louis Whites (1888)
- St. Paul, MN: St. Paul Apostles (1888–1891)
- Salina, KS: Salina Millers (1938–1941); Salina Blue Jays (1946–1952)
- Sapulpa, OK: Sapulpa Oilers 1909–1911
- Sedalia, MO: Sedalia Gold Bugs (1905)
- Shawnee, OK: Shawnee Robins (1929–1930)
- Sherman, TX: Sherman Hitters (1915); Sherman Lions (1916); Sherman Browns (1917)
- Sioux City, IA: Sioux City Cornhuskers (1888–1891)
- Springfield, MO: Springfield Highlanders (1905); Springfield Midgets (1906–1909); Springfield Jobbers (1911); Springfield Merchants (1920); Springfield Midgets (1921–1930); Springfield Cardinals (1931–1932); Springfield Red Wings (1934); Springfield Cardinals (1935–1942, 1948); Springfield Cubs (1950)
- Toledo, OH: Toledo Mud Hens (1901)
- Topeka, KS: Topeka Populists (1893); Topeka White Sox (1905–1907); Topeka Jayhawkers (1908); Topeka Senators (1924); Topeka Jayhawks 1927–1928; Topeka Jayhawks (1932); Topeka Owls (1939–1942, 1946–1954)
- Tulsa, OK: Tulsa Oilers (1910); Tulsa Railroaders (1911); Tulsa Oilers (1914); Tulsa Producers (1915–1917)
- Webb City, MO: Webb City Goldbugs (1906–1907); Webb City Webbfeet (1908–1909)
- Wheeling, WV: Wheeling Stogies (1901)
- Wichita, KS: Wichita Jobbers (1905–1908)

== Year–by–year 1888 to 1891 ==
1888 Western Association – schedule

Team standings	W	L	PCT	GB	Managers
Kansas City Blues	76	42	.644	-	Jim Manning
Des Moines Prohibitionists	73	40	.646	½	Charlie Morton
St. Paul Apostles	61	38	.616	5½	Andrew Thompson
Omaha Omahogs	55	48	.534	13½	Frank Selee
Milwaukee Brewers	53	54	.495	17½	Jim Hart
Chicago Maroons	41	71	.366	32	Moxie Hengle
St. Louis Whites	10	18	.357	NA	Tom Loftus
Sioux City Cornhuskers	21	38	.356	NA	William Bryan / Jim Powell
Minneapolis Millers	28	52	.350	NA	Al Gooding / Dave Rowe
Davenport Onion Weeders	4	21	.160	NA	William Lucas

St. Louis disbanded June 20; Sioux City began play July 4 and later disbanded; Minneapolis moved to Davenport August 25

Player statistics
Player	Team	Stat	Tot	Player	Team	Stat	Tot
Spud Johnson	Kansas City	BA	.342	Tom Lovett	Omaha	W	30
Jim Manning	Kansas City	Runs	123	Tom Lovett	Omaha	SO	273
Bug Holliday	Des Moines	Hits	147	Kid Nichols	Kansas City	ERA	1.14
Orator Shaffer	Des Moines	Hits	147	Kid Nichols	Kansas City	PCT	.889 16–2
Scrappy Carroll	St. Paul	HR	16				
Jim Manning	Kansas City	SB	101				

1889 Western Association – schedule

Team standings	W	L	PCT	GB	Managers
Omaha Omahogs	83	38	.686	-	Frank Selee
St. Paul Apostles	75	46	.620	8	Andrew Thompson / John Barnes
Minneapolis Millers	66	55	.545	17	Samuel Morton / Moxie Hengle
Sioux City Cornhuskers	64	60	.516	20½	Jim Powell
Milwaukee Creams	58	63	.479	25	Ezra Sutton
Denver Grizzlies	51	70	.421	32	Dave Rowe
St. Joseph Clay Eaters	41	70	.369	37	Charles Lord / A.H. Truckenmiller; Chippy McGarr
Des Moines Prohibitionists	41	77	.347	40½	Jimmy Macullar

Player statistics
Player	Team	Stat	Tot	Player	Team	Stat	Tot
Monk Cline	Sioux City	BA	.364	Kid Nichols	Omaha	W	39
Monk Cline	Sioux City	Runs	172	Kid Nichols	Omaha	SO	368
Abner Dalrymple	Denver	Hits	173	Martin Duke	Minneapolis	ERA	1.66
Charlie Reilly	St. Paul	HR	27	Kid Nichols	Omaha	PCT	.830 39–8

1890 Western Association – schedule

Team standings	W	L	PCT	GB	Managers
Kansas City Blues	78	39	.667	-	Charles Hackett / Jim Manning
Milwaukee Brewers	76	47	.655	½	Charlie Cushman
Minneapolis Millers	80	43	.650	1	Samuel Morton / Tim Hurst
Denver Grizzlies	57	64	.471	23	Dave Rowe
Sioux City Cornhuskers	55	64	.462	24	Jim Powell
Omaha Omahogs	51	69	.425	28½	Frank Leonard
Des Moines / Lincoln	48	73	.397	32	Jimmy Macullar
St. Paul Apostles	37	84	.306	43	Andrew Thompson / Bill Watkins

Des Moines (31–52) moved to Lincoln August 1.

Player statistics
Player	Team	Stat	Tot	Player	Team	Stat	Tot
Buster Hoover	Kansas City	BA	.336	John Thornton	Milwaukee	W	29
Elmer Smith	Denver	Runs	128	Martin Duke	Minneapolis	SO	308
Dan Minnehan	Minneapolis	Hits	178	Martin Duke	Minneapolis	ERA	0.81
Scrappy Carroll	St. Paul	HR	21	Nat Hudson	Minneapolis	PCT	765 13–4
Jim Manning	Kansas City	SB	96	Willard Mains	St. Paul	HB	40

1891 Western Association - schedule

Team standings	W	L	PCT	GB	Managers
Sioux City Cornhuskers	66	57	.537	-	Al Buckenberger
Kansas City Blues	66	59	.528	1	Jim Manning
Omaha Lambs	51	59	.464	8½	Dan Shannon / Bob Leadley
Denver Mountaineers	53	63	.457	9½	George Tebeau / W.L. Van Horn; Sam Cantrell
Milwaukee Brewers	59	37	.615	NA	Charlie Cushman
Minneapolis Millers	52	47	.525	NA	W.H. Harkington (8/11) / Samuel Morton
Lincoln Rustlers	46	49	.484	NA	Dave Rowe
St. Paul Apostles / Duluth Whalebacks	39	61	.390	NA	Bill Watkins / Jay Anderson

St. Paul (17–34) moved to Duluth June 8; Milwaukee joined American Association August 18; Duluth, Minneapolis and Lincoln disbanded August 20.

Player statistics
Player	Team	Stat	Tot	Player	Team	Stat	Tot
Rasty Wright	Duluth/Omaha	BA	.353	Billy Hart	Sioux City	W	25
Jim Manning	Denver	Runs	138	Tom Vickery	Milwaukee	SO	153
Ecky Stearns	Kansas City	Hits	156	George Davies	Milwaukee	Pct	.767; 23–7
Dell Darling	Minneapolis	HR	18				

== Year–by–year 1893 to 1899 ==
1893 Western Association

Team standings	W	L	PCT	GB	Managers
Kansas City Cowboys	12	8	.600	-	William Lucas
St. Joseph Saints	11	8	.579	½	Harry Gatewood
Topeka Populists	8	12	.400	4	Duff Cooley
Lawrence Farmers	7	12	.368	4½	John Rodemaker / John Hayden

The League disbanded June 20.
Playoff: Kansas City 4 games, St. Joseph 2.

Player statistics
Player	Team	Stat	Tot	Player	Team	Stat	Tot
Ducky Holmes	St. Joseph	BA	.481	Bert Cunningham	Kansas City	W	7
Cornelius Holohan	St. Joseph	Runs	28	Bert Cunningham	Kansas City	SO	35
Harry Howe	St. Joseph	Hits	37	Gus Mackey	Lawrence	SO	35
Andy Costello	Lawrence	HR	4	Harry Howe	St. Joseph	PCT	1.000 3–0
Cornelius Holohan	St. Joseph	SB	18				

1894 Western Association

Team standings	W	L	PCT	GB	Managers
Rock Island-Moline Islanders	72	50	.590	-	Harry Sage
Peoria Distillers	68	55	.553	4½	George Brackett
Lincoln Treeplanters	67	56	.545	5½	Hi Ebright
Jacksonville Jacks	67	57	.540	6	Con Strothers
Omaha Omahogs	66	59	.528	7½	Pa Rourke
St. Joseph Saints	57	66	.463	15½	Bill Kneisley / Hugh Nicol
Des Moines Prohibitionists	55	73	.430	20	Hugh Nicol / Bill Traffley
Quincy Ravens	42	78	.350	29	Burt Merrifield

Player statistics
Player	Team	Stat	Tot
Joe Katz	Rock Island/Moline	BA	.404
George McVey	Omaha	Hits	215
Emmett Seery	Omaha	Runs	196
Joe Strauss	Jacksonville	HR	33
Walt Preston	St. Joseph	SB	55

1895 Western Association – schedule

Team standings	W	L	PCT	GB	Managers
Lincoln Treeplanters	80	48	.624	-	Hi Ebright
Peoria Distillers	74	55	.574	6½	Dan Dugdale
Des Moines Prohibitionists	71	55	.563	8	Bill Traffley
Rockford Forest City	66	60	.524	13	Hugh Nicol
Quincy Ravens	63	63	.500	16	George Brackett
St. Joseph Saints	45	79	.363	33	Harry Gatewood / Gus Alberts
Omaha Omahogs / Denver	52	47	.525	NA	Dave Rowe / Tom Morrissey
Burlington Colts	13	13	.500	NA	Paul Hines
Jacksonville Jacks / Springfield	34	59	.366	NA	William Punch / Deveney; Jacob Aydelotte / Bob Caruthers
Dubuque	3	21	.125	NA	Tom Morrissey

Jacksonville moved to Springfield; Omaha moved to Denver July 22; Burlington and Dubuque entered August 30

Player statistics
Player	Team	Stat	Tot	Player	Team	Stat	Tot
Bill Krieg	Rockford	BA	.452	Fred Barnes	Lincoln	W	34
George Flynn	Peoria	Runs	145	Fred Barnes	Lincoln	PCT	.810 34–8
Bill Krieg	Rockford	Hits	237				
Sam Mertes	Quincy	HR	13				

1896 Western Association – schedule

Team standings	W	L	PCT	GB	Managers
Des Moines Prohibitionists	56	22	.718	-	Bill Traffley
Dubuque	47	34	.580	10½	Sam LaRoque
Peoria Distillers	43	35	.551	13	Dan Dugdale
Rockford Forest City	44	37	.543	13½	Hugh Nicol
Cedar Rapids Bunnies	29	49	.372	27	Hi Ebright / Belden Hill
Burlington Colts	28	51	.354	28½	Paul Hines / Bob Caruthers
Quincy Bluebirds	31	37	.456	NA	George Brackett / Andy Sommers
St. Joseph Saints	31	44	.413	NA	Frank Haller / Henry Dye

Quincy disbanded July 16; St. Joseph disbanded July 18; Dubuque, Peoria and Rockford disbanded July 25.
League disbanded August 1.

Player statistics
Player	Team	Stat	Tot	Player	Team	Stat	Tot
Bill Krieg	Rockford	BA	.350	Frank Figgenmeier	Des Moines	W	17
Tom Letcher	Des Moines	Runs	88	John Dolan	Dubuque	ERA	1.31
Bill Krieg	Rockford	Hits	123	Frank Figgenmeier	Des Moines	PCT	.850 17–3
Bill Krieg	Rockford	HR	15				
Bill Baer	Dubuque	SB	48				

1897 Western Association – schedule
President: Thomas Hickey

Team standings	W	L	PCT	GB	Managers
Cedar Rapids Bunnies	84	41	.672	-	Belden Hill
St. Joseph Saints	80	45	.640	4	Palmer
Rockford Forest City	70	55	.560	14	Varney Anderson
Des Moines Prohibitionists	67	57	.540	16½	Pete Lohman
Peoria Blackbirds	56	68	.452	27½	Dan Dugdale / Hi Ebright; Pat Wright
Quincy Little Giants	56	69	.448	28	Bill Traffley / Eugene McGreevy
Dubuque	47	79	.373	37½	Joe Cantillon / Martin McQuaid
Burlington Colts	39	85	.315	44½	Dal Williams / Bob Berryhill

Player statistics
Player	Team	Stat	Tot	Player	Team	Stat	Tot
Irv Waldron	St. Joseph	BA	.353	Lou Mahaffey	Cedar Rapids	W	30
Ron Viox	St. Joseph	Runs	130	George Carish	St. Joseph	ERA	1.19
Billy Klusman	St. Joseph	Hits	175	Lou Mahaffey	Cedar Rapids	PCT	.750 30–10
Jimmy Williams	St. Joseph	HR	31	George Cooper	Des Moines	HB	42
Louis Lippert	Burlington	SB	76				

1898 Western Association

Team standings	W	L	PCT	GB	Managers
Peoria Blackbirds	28	14	.667	-	Pat Wright
Quincy	23	16	.590	3½	Pete Lohman
Dubuque	26	22	.542	4	Ted Sullivan / George Brown
Rock Island-Moline Islanders	19	23	.452	8	Varney Anderson / Henry Sage
Ottumwa Giants	18	25	.419	9½	William A. Smith
St. Joseph Saints	12	28	.300	14	Hi Ebright
Cedar Rapids Bunnies	21	9	.700	NA	Belden Hill
Burlington Hawkeyes	7	17	.292	NA	Bill Krieg

Burlington disbanded June 5; Cedar Rapids disbanded June 9; Rock Island-Moline disbanded June 26, causing the league to disband.

Player statistics
Player	Team	Stat	Tot	Player	Team	Stat	Tot
Jay Andrews	Cedar Rapids / Rock Island-Moline /St. Joseph	BA	.345	Dick Smith	Cedar Rapids / Rock Island-Moline	W	12
Bill Connors	Peoria	Runs	38	Joe McGinnity	Peoria	SO	74
Jack Thornton	Dubuque	Hits	59	Dick Smith	Cedar Rapids / Rock Island-Moline	PCT	.857 12–2
Jay Andrews	Cedar Rapids / Rock Island-Moline /St. Joseph	HR	3				
Louis Lippert	Burlington	SB	26				

1899 Western Association – schedule
President: Thomas Hickey

Team standings	W	L	PCT	GB	Managers
Rock Island-Moline Islanders	28	8	.778	-	Harry Sage
Rockford Roughriders	20	16	.556	8	Hunkey Hines
Cedar Rapids Bunnies	22	14	.611	6	Belden Hill
Bloomington Blues	14	23	.378	14½	Bill Krieg / Fred Blanford
Ottumwa Giants	13	24	.351	15½	Pat Flaherty
Quincy / Dubuque	11	23	.324	16	Ed Deady

Quincy (3–10) moved to Dubuque May 19. Dubuque disbanded June 13.
The league disbanded June 16.

Player statistics
Player	Team	Stat	Tot	Player	Team	Stat	Tot
Charlie Buelow	Rockford	BA	.331	Elmer Stricklett	Rock Island-Moline	W	14
Byron McKibben	Cedar Rapids	Runs	47	Elmer Stricklett	Rock Island-Moline	PCT	.933 14–1
Charlie Buelow	Rockford	Hits	48				
Harry Bay	Rock Island-Moline	Hits	48				
Luke Lutenberg	Rockford	HR	2				
Elmer Stricklett	Rock Island-Moline	HR	2				
Harry Bay	Rock Island-Moline	HR	2				
Franklin Donnelly	Cedar Rapids	SB	19				
Ollie Thiel	Bloomington	SB	19				

== Year–by–year 1901 ==
1901 Western Association – schedule

Team standings	W	L	PCT	GB	Managers
Dayton Veterans	85	55	.607	-	Bill Armour
Louisville Colonels / Grand Rapids Woodworkers	83	55	.601	1.0	Walt Wilmot
Toledo Mud Hens	78	60	.565	6	Charlie Stroebel
Fort Wayne Railroaders	73	67	.521	12	Doggie Miller
Grand Rapids Woodworkers / Wheeling Stogies	69	64	.519	12½	George Ellis / Bill White
Indianapolis Hoosiers	60	78	.435	24	Bill Watkins
Columbus Senators	54	86	.386	31	Frank Metz / Jim Gardner; Ed Zinram
Marion	51	88	.367	33½	Pat Wright

Grand Rapids (22–13) moved to Wheeling June 3; Louisville (38–23) moved to Grand Rapids July 2.

Player statistics
Player	Team	Stat	Tot	Player	Team	Stat	Tot
Tuck Turner	Toledo	BA	.348	Harvey Bailey	Louisviile/Grand Rapids	W	35
Pat Meaney	Mansfield	Hits	181	Alfred Pardee	Toledo	SO	237
Natty Nattress	Fort Wayne	Runs	124	Archie Stimmell	Indianapolis	PCT	.778 14–4
Tuck Turner	Toledo	HR	14				
Dusty Miller	Toledo	SB	52				
George Smith	Dayton	SB	52				

== Year–by–year 1905 to 1911 ==
1905 Western Association
Teams in Joplin, Missouri, Leavenworth, Kansas, Sedalia, Missouri, Springfield, Missouri, and Topeka, Kansas joined from the Missouri Valley League. Teams from Guthrie, Oklahoma, and Oklahoma City, Oklahoma joined from the Southwestern League. A new team in Wichita, Kansas formed and joined the league.

Team name	Record
Wichita Jobbers	79–56
Oklahoma City Mets	77–58
Leavenworth Orioles	75–59
Sedalia Goldbugs	70–64
Guthrie Senators	66–70
Joplin Miners	65–73
Topeka White Sox	54–80
Springfield Highlanders	54–80

1906 Western Association
The teams in Guthrie and Sedalia folded. The St. Joseph, Missouri team moved from the Western League. A new team in Webb City, Missouri formed and joined the league. The St. Joseph team, with a record of 16–24, moved to Hutchinson, Kansas, on July 12, where their record was 39–60.

Team name	Record
Topeka White Sox	82–56
Joplin Miners	75–62
Wichita Jobbers	75–65
Springfield Midgets	72–67
Oklahoma City Mets	70–69
Leavenworth Old Soldiers	68–72
Webb City Gold Bugs	57–79
St. Joseph Packers/Hutchinson Salt Packers	55–84

1907 Western Association

Team name	Record
Wichita Jobbers	98–35
Oklahoma City Mets	86–54
Hutchinson Salt Packers	77–59
Topeka White Sox	75–65
Joplin Miners	71–64
Webb City Goldbugs	65–70
Springfield Midgets	46–92
Leavenworth Convicts	29–108

1908 Western Association
The Leavenworth team folded, and a new team in Enid, Oklahoma, formed and joined the league.

Team name	Record
Topeka Jayhawkers	89–50
Wichita Jobbers	87–53
Oklahoma City Mets	81–58
Joplin Miners	71–65
Hutchinson Salt Packers	69–70
Webb City Webfeet	66–69
Springfield Midgets	48–85
Enid Railroaders	38–99

1909 Western Association
Topeka and Wichita moved to the Western League. Oklahoma City moved to the Texas League. Hutchinson moved to the Kansas State League. Bartlesville, Oklahoma, and Muskogee, Oklahoma, joined from the Oklahoma–Kansas League. New teams in Guthrie, Oklahoma, and Pittsburg, Kansas formed and joined the league. The Joplin team, with a record of 20–43, moved to El Reno, Oklahoma on July 4, where their record was 16–46. The Webb City team, with a record of 35–39, moved to Sapulpa, Oklahoma on July 18, where their record was 29–20.

Team name	Record
Enid Railroaders	82–44
Muskogee Navigators	74–51
Guthrie Senators	70–55
Bartlesville Boosters	66–59
Webb City Webfeet/Sapulpa Oilers	64–59
Springfield Midgets	56–70
Pittsburg Pirates	52–73
Joplin Miners / El Reno Packers	36–89

1910 Western Association
The Pittsburg and Springfield teams folded. New teams in Joplin, Missouri, and Tulsa, Oklahoma, formed and joined the league. The Muskogee and Tulsa teams both folded on July 22, and the Bartlesville and El Reno teams both folded on July 31.

Team name	Record
Joplin Miners	90–34
Enid Railroaders	64–53
Sapulpa Oilers	65–61
Guthrie Senators	47–73
El Reno Packers	65–43
Bartlesville Boosters	51–51
Muskogee Navigators	36–63
Tulsa Oilers	28–68

1911 Western Association
The teams in Enid and Guthrie folded. New teams in Coffeyville, Kansas, Fort Smith, Arkansas, Independence, Kansas, Muskogee, Oklahoma, and Tulsa, Oklahoma formed and joined the league. The Joplin and Springfield teams folded May 10, the Coffeyville and Independence teams June 14, and all other teams and the league itself on June 19.

Team name	Record
Fort Smith Scouts	29–14 (1st half winner)
Muskogee Redskins	23–21 (2nd half winner)
Sapulpa Oilers	23–21
Tulsa Railroaders	20–25
Independence Packers	15–22
Coffeyville White Sox	15–24
Joplin Miners	3–2
Springfield Jobbers	2–3

== Year–by–year 1914 to 1917 ==
1914 Western Association
New teams in Fort Smith, Arkansas, Joplin, Missouri/Webb City, Missouri, McAlester, Oklahoma, Muskogee, Oklahoma, Oklahoma City, Oklahoma, and Tulsa, Oklahoma formed and created the new league.

1914
Joplin-Webb City, with a record of 22–46, moved to Guthrie, Oklahoma on July 10, where they had a record of 2–10, and then to Henryetta, Oklahoma on July 22, where they had a record of 11–36.

Team name	Record
Tulsa Oilers	74–49
Oklahoma City Boosters	75–52 (1st half winner)
Fort Smith Twins	73–52
Muskogee Mets	74–54 (2nd half winner)
McAlester Miners	47–79
Joplin-Webb City Miners/Guthrie Senators/Henryetta Boosters	35–92

Oklahoma City beat Muskogee 4 games to 2 for the championship.

1915 Western Association
Henryetta folded. Teams from Denison, Texas, and Paris, Texas, joined from the Texas–Oklahoma League. A new team formed in Sherman, Texas, and joined the league.

Team name	Record
Denison Railroaders	76–53
Oklahoma City Senators	76–62
Sherman Hitters	70–65
Muskogee Mets	68–66
Paris Red Snappers	66–66
Tulsa Producers	63–71
Fort Smith Twins	61–75
McAlester Miners	57–79

Oklahoma City beat Muskogee 4 games to 3 for the championship.

1916 Western Association

Team name	Record
Denison Railroaders	86–49 (1st half winner)
Tulsa Producers	80–58 (2nd half winner)
McAlester Miners	79–58
Oklahoma City Senators	64–73
Muskogee Mets	63–77
Fort Smith Twins	61–76
Sherman Lions	61–76
Paris Survivors	56–83

Denison beat Tulsa 4 games to 2 for the championship.

1917 Western Association
Paris, with a record of 16–12, moved to Ardmore, Oklahoma, on May 10, where they had a record of 41–86.

Team name	Record
McAlester Miners	95–57
Muskogee Reds	89–69
Sherman Browns	80–72
Denison Railroaders	79–75
Fort Smith Twins	77–82
Oklahoma City Boosters	72–80
Tulsa Producers	68–84
Paris Athletics/Ardmore Foundlings	57–98

All teams, and the league itself, folded.

== Year–by–year 1920 to 1932 ==
1920 Western Association
New teams in Chickasha, Oklahoma, Drumright, Oklahoma, Enid, Oklahoma, Fort Smith, Arkansas, Henryetta, Oklahoma, Okmulgee, Oklahoma, Pawhuska, Oklahoma, and Springfield, Missouri were formed. The new American Association was formed. The team with the best record in the first half of the season played against the team with the best record in the second half of the season for the championship.

1920

Team name	Record
Okmulgree Drillers	83–46 (1st half winner)
Fort Smith Twins	80–58
Enid Harvesters	71–53 (2nd half winner)
Henryetta Hens	75–56
Drumright Drummers	66–62
Springfield Merchants	58–76
Chickasha Chicks	52–72
Pawhuska Huskers	33–95

Enid and Okmulgee tied 3 games to 3 in the championship round.

1921 Western Association

Team name	Record
Springfield Midgets	85–60
Fort Smith Twins	83–61 (2nd half winner)
Henryetta Hens	77–66
Pawhuska Huskers	76–71
Enid Harvesters	77–74
Chickasha Chicks	74–74 (1st half winner)
Okmulgee Drillers	71–76
Drumright Oilers	44–105

Chickasha beat Fort Smith 4 games to 3 for the championship. Springifled beat Independence (of the Southwestern League) 2 games to 1 Ardmore (of the Texas–Oklahoma League) beat Chickasha 2 games to none

1922 Western Association
Chickasha moved to the Oklahoma State League. Drumright folded. The team from Joplin, Missouri joined from the Western League, and a new team in McAlester, Oklahoma formed and joined. The Pawhuska team folded on August 16, forfeiting the remainder of their games.

Team name	Record
Enid Harvesters	104–27 (2nd half winner)
Joplin Miners	93–42 (1st half winner)
Henryetta Hens	74–56
Springfield Midgets	68–69
Okmulgee Drillers	56–79
Fort Smith Twins	54–79
McAlester Miners	49–82
Pawhuska Osages	29–93

1923 Western Association
The team from Ardmore, Oklahoma joined from the Texas–Oklahoma League. The team in McAlester folded July 19, and the Henryetta team folded July 21.

Team name	Record
Joplin Miners	83–60
Ardmore Snappers	82–60 (2nd half winner)
Okmulgee Drillers	81–63 (1st half winner)
Enid Harvesters	80–65
Springfield Midgets	70–74
Fort Smith Twins	53–92
Henryetta Hens	43–38
McAlester Diggers	27–57

Ardmore beat Okmulgee 4 games to 2 for the championship.

1924 Western Association
Ardmore moved to the Oklahoma State League, and Enid moved to the Southwestern League. Teams from Bartlesville, Oklahoma, Hutchinson, Kansas, Muskogee, Oklahoma, and Topeka, Kansas, joined from the Southwestern League. The Bartlesville team, with a record of 19–23, moved to Ardmore, Oklahoma on June 8, where their record was 56–59. The Joplin team, with a record of 25–24, moved to Bartlesville on June 16, where their record was 44–63.

Team name	Record
Okmulgee Drillers	110–48 (1st half & 2nd half winner)
Fort Smith Twins	97–63
Muskogee Athletics	97–65
Hutchinson Wheat Shockers	81–80
Bartlesville Bearcats/Ardmore Bearcats	75–82
Joplin Miners/Bartlesville Boosters	69–87
Topeka Senators	59–98
Springfield Midgets	47–112

1925 Western Association
The teams in Bartlesville and Hutchinson folded. Topeka moved to the Southwestern League. A new team in Independence, Kansas, formed and joined the league.

Team name	Record
Fort Smith Twins	94–56
Ardmore Boomers	86–64 (1st half winner)
Okmulgee Drillers	80–71
Muskogee Athletics	79–72 (2nd half winner)
Springfield Midgets	67–82
Independence Producers	44–105

Ardmore beat Muskogee 4 games to 1 for the title.

1926 Western Association
The team in Independence folded. A new team in McAlester, Oklahoma, formed and joined the league. Ardmore moved to Joplin, Missouri on July 14. The teams in McAlester and Muskogee folded on July 20.

Team name	Record
Springfield Midgets	92–66 (1st half winner)
Fort Smith Twins	92–68
Ardmore Boomers/Joplin Ozarks	77–81
Okmulgee Drillers	73–85
Muskogee Athletics	51–45
McAlester Miners	28–68

1927 Western Association
The team in Joplin folded. A team from St. Joseph, Missouri, joined from the Western League, and one from Topeka, Kansas joined from the Southwestern League. A new team in Muskogee, Oklahoma, formed and joined the league. The team in St. Joseph, with a record of 38–32, moved to Joplin on July 7, where their record was 35–28.

Team name	Record
Fort Smith Twins	81–51
Topeka Jayhawks	74–58
St. Joseph Saints/Joplin Miners	73–60
Springfield Midgets	63–69
Okmulgee Drillers	57–75
Muskogee Chiefs	48–83

1928 Western Association
The team in Okmulgee folded, and a new team in Independence, Kansas, formed and joined the league.

Team name	Record
Fort Smith Twins	74–63
Topeka Jayhawks	70–61
Joplin Miners	70–65 (1st half winner)
Independence Producers	66–67 (2nd half winner)
Springfield Midgets	61–66
Muskogee Chiefs	58–77

Joplin beat Independence 4 games to 2 for the title.

1929 Western Association
Topeka moved to the Western League. A new team in Shawnee, Oklahoma, formed and joined the league. The Muskogee team moved to Maud, Oklahoma, on August 22.

Team name	Record
Fort Smith Twins	88–59 (2nd half winner)
Shawnee Robins	87–61 (1st half winner)
Springfield Midgets	71–77
Independence Producers	71–78
Joplin Miners	60–82
Muskogee Chiefs/Maud Chiefs	61–89

1930 Western Association
The Maud team moved back to Muskogee, Oklahoma.

The Independence Producers played the first Night game in the history of Organized Baseball.

Team name	Record
Independence Producers	76–56 (2nd half winner)
Joplin Miners	76–59 (1st half winner)
Shawnee Robins	65–71
Fort Smith Twins	64–72
Springfield Midgets	64–73
Muskogee Chiefs	60–74

Independence beat Joplin 5 games to 4 for the title.

1931 Western Association
The Shawnee team folded. A new team in Bartlesville, Oklahoma formed.

Team name	Record
Springfield Red Wings	87–57 (1st & 2nd half winner)
Joplin Miners	80–62
Independence Producers	77–69
Fort Smith Twins	74–76
Muskogee Chiefs	64–86
Bartlesville Broncos	59–91

1932 Western Association
The Joplin team, with a record of 2–1, moved to Topeka, Kansas, on May 6, where their record was 36–37. The Independence team, with a record of 12–10, moved to Joplin, Missouri, on May 23, where their record was 7–10, to Independence, Kansas, again on June 10, where their record was 4–12, and finally to Hutchinson, Kansas, on July 20, where their record was 35–36. The Muskogee team, with a record of 18–16, moved to Hutchinson, Kansas, where their record was 19–32, on June 8, and folded on July 18. The Fort Smith team, with a record of 23–29, moved to Muskogee on July 1, where their record was 25–51. The Topeka team folded July 18.

Team name	Affiliation	Record
Springfield Cardinals	St. Louis Cardinals	79–51 (1st half winner)
Bartlesville Broncos		77–52 (2nd half winner)
Independence Producers/Joplin Miners/Independence/Hutchinson		58–68
Fort Smith Twins/Muskogee Chiefs	St. Louis Browns	48–80
Joplin Miners/Topeka Jayhawks		38–38
Muskogee Chiefs/Hutchinson Wheat Shockers		37–48

Springfield beat Bartlesville 5 games to 4 for the title. The Atchinson and Springfield teams moved to the Western League. The Belleville and Muskogee teams, and the Western Association itself, folded.

== Year–by–year 1934 to 1954 (with World War II break) ==
1934 Western Association
The new League and all six member teams were created. The season was broken into halves, with the first half and second–half winners competing in the championship. The founding teams were in Bartlesville, Oklahoma; Hutchinson, Kansas; Joplin, Missouri; Muskogee, Oklahoma; Ponca City, Oklahoma; Springfield, Missouri.

Team name	Affiliation (if any)	Final record
Springfield Red Wings	St. Louis Cardinals	76–58 (1st half tie) (2nd half winner)
Ponca City Angels	Chicago Cubs	73–61 (1st half tie)
Joplin Miners	Boston Red Sox	66–68
Hutchinson Larks		66–68
Bartlesville Reds	Cincinnati Reds	63–69
Muskogee Tigers		56–76

Ponca City defeated Springfield in a one-game playoff for the first-half title. Springfield defeated Ponca City 4 games to 3 for the league title.

1935 Western Association
Springfield changed their name to the "Cardinals".

Springfield Cardinals	St. Louis Cardinals	87–48 (1st half title)
Ponca City Angels	Chicago Cubs	76–55 (2nd half title)
Hutchinson Larks	St. Louis Cardinals	68–61
Muskogee Tigers		60–71
Bartlesville Reds	Cincinnati Reds	56–79
Joplin Miners	New York Yankees	48–81

Ponca City beat Springfield 5 games to 4 for the championship.

1936 Western Association

Ponca City Angels	Chicago Cubs	87–57 (2nd half title)
Joplin Miners	New York Yankees	83–58 (1st half title)
Hutchinson Larks	Pittsburgh Pirates	79–65
Springfield Cardinals	St. Louis Cardinals	64–78
Muskogee Tigers	Brooklyn Dodgers	61–80
Bartlesville Bucs		53–81

Ponca City won the title over Joplin 5 games to 2.

1937 Western Association

Muskogee Reds	Cincinnati Reds	79–61
Hutchinson Larks	Pittsburgh Pirates	78–64
Joplin Miners	New York Yankees	76–66
Springfield Cardinals	St. Louis Cardinals	76–67
Ponca City Angels	Chicago Cubs	71–69
Bartlesville Blues	New York Yankees	45–98

Joplin beat Muskogee 4 games to 3 and Springfield beat Hutchinson 3 games to 1 in the first round of playoffs. Springfield beat Joplin 4 games to 3 for the title.

1938 Western Association
New teams in Fort Smith, Arkansas and Salina, Kansas were formed.

Ponca City Angels	Chicago Cubs	84–54
Springfield Cardinals	St. Louis Cardinals	79–56
Fort Smith Giants	New York Giants	74–65
Hutchinson Larks	Pittsburgh Pirates	70–67
Muskogee Reds	Cincinnati Reds	71–68
Joplin Miners	New York Yankees	63–74
Bartlesville Chiefs		61–78
Salina Millers		47–87

Ponca City beat Fort Smith 3 games to 1, and Hutchinson beat Springfield 3 games to 2, in the first round of the playoffs. Ponca City beat Hutchinson 4 games to 1 for the championship.

1939 Western Association
Ponca City moved to St. Joseph, Missouri. Bartlesville folded. A new team formed in Topeka, Kansas.

Fort Smith Giants	New York Giants	83–50
Joplin Miners	New York Yankees	81–56
Springfield Cardinals	St. Louis Cardinals	78–60
Topeka Owls	St. Louis Browns	72–65
St. Joseph Angels	Chicago Cubs	66–72
Muskogee Reds	Cincinnati Reds	60–76
Salina Millers		55–79
Hutchinson Pirates	Pittsburgh Pirates	49–86

1940 Western Association

Muskogee Reds		90–49
Topeka Owls	St. Louis Browns	73–60
Fort Smith Giants	New York Giants	70–63
St. Joseph Saints	Chicago Cubs	69–63
Joplin Miners	New York Yankees	68–64
Salina Millers		60–75
Springfield Cardinals	St. Louis Cardinals	56–76
Hutchinson Pirates	Pittsburgh Pirates	50–86

Fort Smith beat Muskogee 3 games to none, and St. Joseph beat Topeka 3 games to 1, in the first round of the playoffs. St. Joseph beat Fort Smith 3 games to none for the championship.

1941 Western Association
On June 3, the St. Joseph Ponies (10–22) moved to Carthage, Missouri and became the Carthage Browns and an affiliate of the St. Louis Browns. They had a record of 30–74 in Carthage, and ended in last place.

Joplin Miners	New York Yankees	93–41
Springfield Cardinals	St. Louis Cardinals	92–43
Topeka Owls		75–58
Fort Smith Giants	New York Giants	73–60
Muskogee Reds	Cincinnati Reds	64–69
Hutchinson Pirates	Pittsburgh Pirates	53–81
Salina Millers	Cleveland Indians	46–88
St. Joseph Pony Express Riders/Carthage Browns	Chicago Cubs/St. Louis Browns	40–96

1942 Western Association
The two teams with the worst records of the previous year, Carthage and Salina, folded. The league returned to a 1st-half vs. 2nd-half winners championship format.

Topeka Owls		80–53 (2nd half winners)
Muskogee Reds		76–58
Fort Smith Giants	New York Giants	68–63 (1st half winners)
Springfield Cardinals	St. Louis Cardinals	62–70
Joplin Miners	New York Yankees	59–75
Hutchinson Pirates	Pittsburgh Pirates	50–76

Fort Smith beat Topeka 4 games to 3 for the title.

1943–1945 The League suspended play because of World War II.

1946 Western Association
Springfield moved to St. Joseph. New teams formed in Leavenworth, Kansas and Salina, Kansas. Because of the playoff format, the team with the best overall record, the newly formed Leavenworth Braves, did not qualify for the playoffs.

Leavenworth Braves	Boston Braves	76–57
Hutchinson Cubs	Chicago Cubs	73–56 (2nd half winner)
St. Joseph Cardinals	St. Louis Cardinals	75–62
Muskogee Reds	Detroit Tigers	75–64
Fort Smith Giants	New York Giants	67–63 (1st half winner)
Joplin Miners	New York Yankees	61–73
Topeka Owls		53–79
Salina Blue Jays	Philadelphia Phillies	51–77

Hutchinson beat Fort Smith 4 games to 2 for the title.

1947 Western Association
The playoffs format was changed again this year.

Salina Blue Jays	Philadelphia Phillies	85–53
Topeka Owls		83–55
Muskogee Reds	St. Louis Browns	75–64
St. Joseph Cardinals	St. Louis Cardinals	72–67
Joplin Miners	New York Yankees	67–73
Hutchinson Cubs	Chicago Cubs	63–76
Fort Smith Giants	New York Giants	59–78
Leavenworth Braves	Boston Braves	50–88

Muskogee beat Salina 3 games to 2, and St. Joseph beat Topeka 3 games to 2, in the first round of the playoffs. St. Joseph beat Muskogee 4 games to 3 for the championship.

1948 Western Association
The Hutchinson Cubs moved to Springfield, Illinois on July 21. Their record after the move, of 18–45, was worse than their record in Hutchinson, 25–42. No playoff system is known of for this year, so presumably the best overall record is the league champion.

St. Joseph Cardinals	St. Louis Cardinals	90–48
Fort Smith Giants	New York Giants	82–58
Joplin Miners	New York Yankees	75–57
Topeka Owls		70–66
Muskogee Reds	St. Louis Browns	61–70
Leavenworth Braves	Boston Braves	62–75
Salina Blue Jays	Philadelphia Phillies	58–80
Hutchinson Cubs/Springfield Cubs	Chicago Cubs	43–87

1949 Western Association
Springfield moved back to Hutchinson again, changing their name and losing their affiliation. This season, St. Joseph had the best winning percentage in the history of this incarnation of the league. Perhaps coincidentally, Leavenworth had the worst winning percentage in the history of this version of the league in the same year.

St. Joseph Cardinals	St. Louis Cardinals	96–42
Fort Smith Giants	New York Giants	86–54
Joplin Miners	New York Yankees	86–58
Topeka Owls		77–61
Muskogee Reds	St. Louis Browns	77–62
Salina Blue Jays	Philadelphia Phillies	69–69
Hutchinson Elks		41–93
Leavenworth Braves	Boston Braves	25–112

1950 Western Association'
Leavenworth, who ended the previous year with the all–time worst winning percentage in this incarnation of the league, folded. Fort Smith moved to Enid, Oklahoma and a new club from Springfield, Missouri joined.

Joplin Miners	New York Yankees	90–46
Hutchinson Elks	Pittsburgh Pirates	77–60
Springfield Cubs	Chicago Cubs	74–61
Enid Giants	New York Giants	71–63
St. Joseph Cardinals	St. Louis Cardinals	67–69
Topeka Owls		58–81
Muskogee Reds		52–79
Salina Blue Jays	Philadelphia Phillies	53–83

1951 Western Association
Springfield folded, and a new team started up in Fort Smith.

Topeka Owls	Chicago Cubs	74–44
Joplin Miners	New York Yankees	77–48
St. Joseph Cardinals	St. Louis Cardinals	69–51
Salina Blue Jays	Philadelphia Phillies	63–58
Muskogee Giants	New York Giants	61–63
Hutchinson Elks	Pittsburgh Pirates	57–66
Enid Buffalos	Houston Buffaloes	45–79
Fort Smith Indians	Cleveland Indians	43–80

1952 Western Association
This year, the league returned to the 1st-half winner vs. 2nd-half winner playoff format.

Joplin Miners	New York Yankees	87–52 (2nd half winner)
Muskogee Giants	New York Giants	73–66 (1st half winner)
Hutchinson Elks	Pittsburgh Pirates	70–66
Topeka Owls	Chicago Cubs	63–76
Salina Blue Jays	Philadelphia Phillies	61–77
Fort Smith Indians	Cleveland Indians	60–77

1953 Western Association
Salina folded, having made the playoffs only once in its seven years of existence. The Fort Smith Indians changed their name to the Fort Smith–Van Buren Twins, and a new team started in St. Joseph, Missouri with a bang.

St. Joseph Cardinals	St. Louis Cardinals	83–57
Hutchinson Elks	Pittsburgh Pirates	80–60
Topeka Owls	Chicago White Sox	78–62
Joplin Miners	New York Yankees	71–68
Muskogee Giants	New York Giants	57–81
Fort Smith–Van Buren Twins		49–90

St. Joseph beat Joplin and Hutchinson beat Topeka in the first rounds of the playoffs by 3 games to zero each. Hutchinson beat St. Joseph for the championship 4 games to 1.

1954 Western Association
After having changed its name and finishing with the worst record in the league the previous season, Fort Smith folded. New teams started up in Blackwell, Oklahoma, Iola, Kansas, and Ponca City, Oklahoma.

Topeka Owls	Chicago White Sox	87–51
Muskogee Giants	New York Giants	85–54
St. Joseph Saints	New York Yankees	82–57
Blackwell Broncos	Chicago Cubs	79–61
Hutchinson Elks	Pittsburgh Pirates	72–67
Ponca City Jets		62–76
Joplin Cardinals	St. Louis Cardinals	50–89
Iola Indians		39–101

Blackwell beat Topeka 3 games to zero, and St. Joseph beat Muskogee 3 games to 2 in the first round of the playoffs. Blackwell beat St. Joseph 4 games to 1 for the title. After the season, Blackwell joined the Sooner State League, and the other seven teams, and the league itself, folded.

The Western Association prospered during the minor league baseball boom that followed World War II, with its clubs in Topeka, Kansas, and St. Joseph, Missouri, drawing over 100,000 fans and most of its eight clubs tied to major league farm systems. But the bust that followed in the early 1950s, caused by the Korean War, the advent of television, and a retrenchment in MLB farm systems, also buffeted the WA. It finally disbanded after the 1954 season, its champion Topeka club, a Chicago White Sox affiliate, drawing half the number of fans the team had drawn during the late 1940s.
