= Sapulpa Sappers =

- 1909–1923; (1909–1911, 1921–1923); Sapulpa, Oklahoma

Minor league affiliations
- Class: Class C (1909–1910); Class D (1911, 1921); Class C (1922–1923)
- League: Western Association (1909–1911); Southwestern League (1921–1923)

Major league affiliations
- Team: None

Minor league titles
- League titles (1): 1922

Team data
- Name: Sapulpa Oilers (1909–1911); Sapulpa Sappers (1921–1922); Sapulpa Yanks (1923)
- Ballpark: Athletic Park (1909–1911); League Park (1921–1923)

The Sapulpa Sappers was a primary name of the minor league baseball teams based in Sapulpa, Oklahoma. Between 1909 and 1923, Sapulpa teams played as members of the Western Association from 1909 to 1911, Southwestern League in 1921, Southwestern Association in 1922 and Southwestern League in 1923, capturing the 1922 league championship.

== History ==
Minor league baseball began in Sapulpa, Oklahoma in 1909. On July 18, 1909, the Webb City Webfeet of the Class C level Western Association moved from Webb City, Missouri to Sapulpa, playing the remainder of the 1909 season as the Sapulpa Oilers. Sapulpa played home games at Athletic Park. Overall, the Webb City/Sapulpa team placed 5th in the eight–team Western Association. Their overall record was 64–59, playing under managers Perry Parker and Frank Everhart and finishing 16.5 games behind the 1st place Enid Railroaders in the final standings.

Continuing play as members of the 1910 Western Association, Sapulpa placed 3rd in the final standings. The Oilers ended the 1910 season with a 65–61 record in the final standings, 26.0 games behind the 1st place Joplin Miners in the eight–team league. The Oilers' manager was Larry Millton.

In 1911, the Class D level Western Association folded during the season. On June 18, 1911, the Sapulpa Oilers were 23–21 and in 3rd place when the league disbanded. Six Western Association teams had folded, causing the league to disband. The Sapulpa Oilers were managed by George McAvoy and Harry Bradbury in 1911, as the team ended play 6.5 games behind the 1st place Ft. Scott Scouts.

The Sapulpa Sappers franchise became a charter member of the 1921 Class D level Southwestern League. Playing at League Park, Sapulpa finished with a 68–76 record, placing 5th in the 1921 Southwestern League under managers Jerry Jones and Larry Quigley. The 1921 charter member standings featured the Bartlesville Braves (64–80), Coffeyville Refiners (71–72), Independence Producers (103–38), Miami Indians (59–84), Muskogee Mets (93–56), Parsons Parsons/Cushing Oilers (34–110), Pittsburg Pirates (87–63) and the Sapulpa Sappers (68–76). Sapulpa finished 41.5 games behind of the 1st place Independence Producers, who were 19.0 games ahead of the 2nd place Muskogee Mets.

In 1922, the Southwestern League continued play as a Class C level league. The 1922 league is also referred to as the Southwestern Association. The Sapulpa Sappers captured the 1922 Southwestern Association Championship. Playing under Manager Barney Cleveland, Sapulpa finished with a regular season record 81–58, placing 3rd overall, 4.0 games behind the Muskogee Mets in the eight–team league. In the 1922 Playoffs, Sapulpa defeated the Muskogee Mets 4 games to 2 to claim the 1922 Southwestern Association Championship.

The 1923 season was Sapulpa's final minor league season. Playing in the 1923 Class C level Southwestern League, the Sapulpa Yankees finished 2nd overall in the Southwestern League standings. The Sapulpa Yankees ended the season with a record of 76–55 under manager Barney Cleveland, finishing 6.5 games behind the 1st place Hutchinson Wheat Shockers. After the season, the Southwestern League returned only three of the eight franchises in 1924, adding five new franchises to the 1924 league.

Sapulpa, Oklahoma has not hosted another minor league team.

== The ballparks ==
From 1909 to 1911, the Sapulpa Oilers played home games at Athletic Park. The ballpark was reportedly built in 1905.

The Sapulpa minor league teams from 1921 to 1923 hosted home games at League Park. League Park was located at the intersection of West Taft Avenue & South Hickory Street, Sapulpa, Oklahoma.

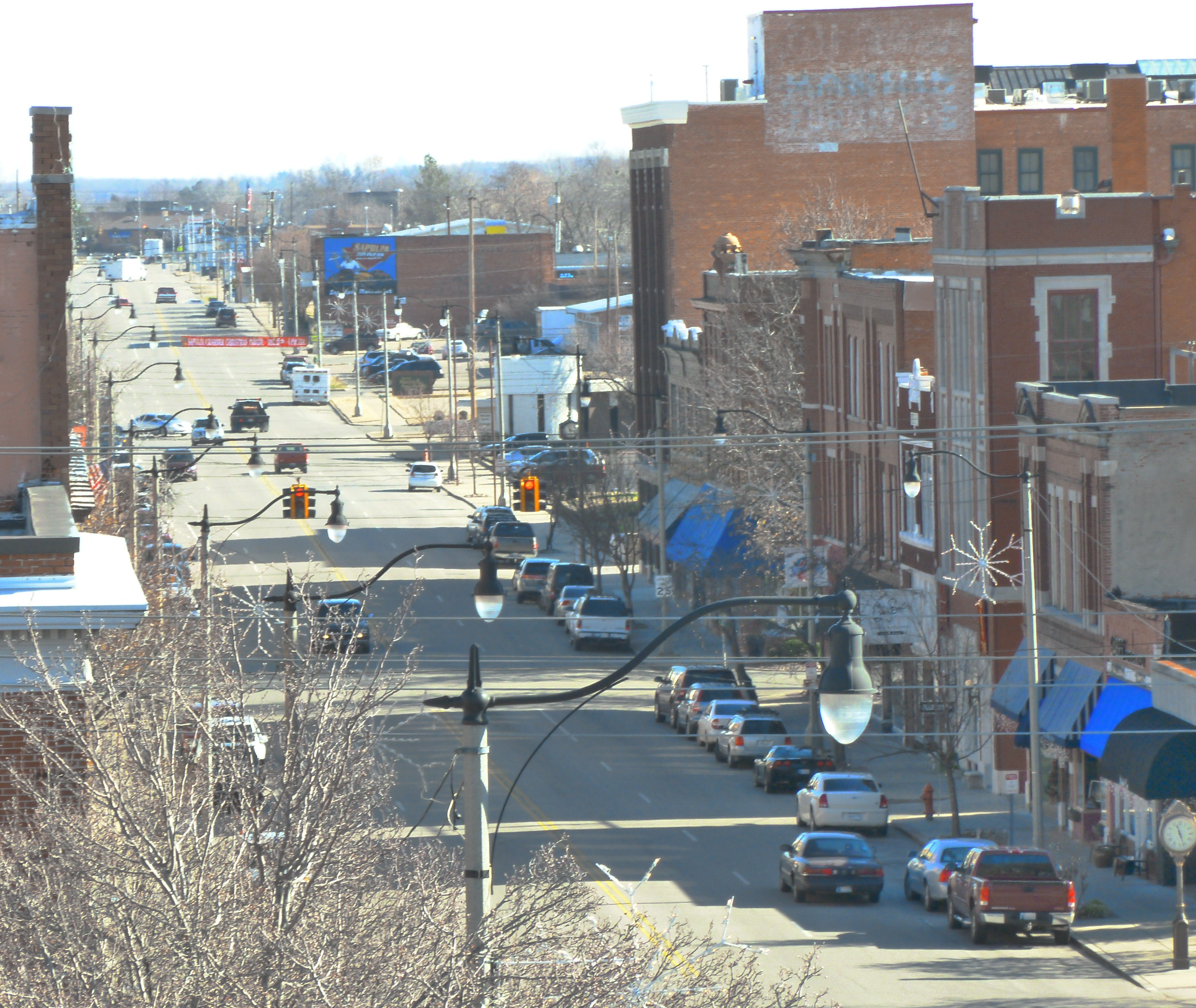
(2011) Main Street. National Register of Historic Places. Sapulpa, Oklahoma

== Timeline ==
Year(s)	# Yrs.	Team	Level	League
1909–1910	2	Sapulpa Oilers	Class C	Western Association
1911	1	Sapulpa Oilers	Class D	Western Association
1921	1	Sapulpa Sappers	Class D	Southwestern League
1922	1	Sapulpa Sappers	Class C	Southwestern League
1923	1	Sapulpa Yanks	Class C	Southwestern League

== Season–by–season ==
Year	Record	Manager	Finish	Playoffs/Notes
1909	64–59	Perry Parker / Frank Everhart	5th	Moved from Webb City July 18, 1909
1910	65–61	Larry Milton	3rd	No playoffs held
1911	23–21	George McAvoy / Harry Bradbury	3rd	League disbanded June 18, 1911
1921	68–76	Jerry Jones / Larry Quigley	5th	No playoffs held
1922	81–58	Barney Cleveland	3rd	League champions
1923	76–55	Barney Cleveland	2nd	No playoffs held

== Notable alumni ==
- Uke Clanton (1921)
- Dick Crutcher (1909)
- Denver Grigsby (1921-1922)
- George McAvoy (1910) (1911, MGR)
- George Milstead (1923)
- Larry Milton (1910, MGR)
- Skinny O'Neal (1923)

== See also ==
- Sapulpa Oilers players
- Sapulpa Yanks players
