= Purtell =

Surname

Purtell is a surname. Notable people with the surname include:

- Adrian Purtell (born 1985), Australian rugby league footballer
- Billy Purtell (1886–1962), third baseman who played five seasons in Major League Baseball
- Marty Purtell (1889–1970), long-time minor league baseball player and manager
- William A. Purtell (1897–1978), American politician from Connecticut

== See also ==
- Purtell Park, rugby league ground in Bardon, a suburb in Brisbane's west
