= Lawrence Jayhawks =

- 1893; Lawrence, Kansas

Minor league affiliations
- Class: Class A (1893)
- League: Western Association (1893)

Major league affiliations
- Team: None

Minor league titles
- League titles (0): None

Team data
- Name: Lawrence Jayhawks (1893)
- Ballpark: South Massachusetts Street Ballpark (1893)

The Lawrence Jayhawks were a minor league baseball team based in Lawrence, Kansas. In 1893, the Lawrence Jayhawks played briefly as members of the Class A level Western Association, which folded during the season. The Jayhawks hosted home minor league games at the South Massachusetts Street Ballpark.

== History ==
In 1893, the Lawrence Jayhawks began minor league play as members of the four–team Class A level Western Association, the highest level of minor league play in the era. The Jayhawks began 1893 play with the Kansas City Cowboys, St. Joseph Saints and Topeka Populists teams joining Lawrence in the Western Association.

The "Jayhawks" moniker corresponds with the mascot of the University of Kansas athletic teams, beginning in 1890. The University of Kansas is located in Lawrence, Kansas.

The Lawrence Jayhawks began Western Association play on May 1, 1893. The Western Association folded during the season. When the league folded on June 20, 1893, Lawrence was in fourth place, 4.5 games behind the first place Kansas City Cowboys. The Jayhawks finished the season with a record of 7–12, playing under managers John Rodemaker and John Hayden. Lawrence finished behind the Kansas City Cowboys (12–8), St. Joseph Saints (11–8) and Topeka Populists (8–12) in the final standings.

Lawrence, Kansas has not hosted another minor league team.}

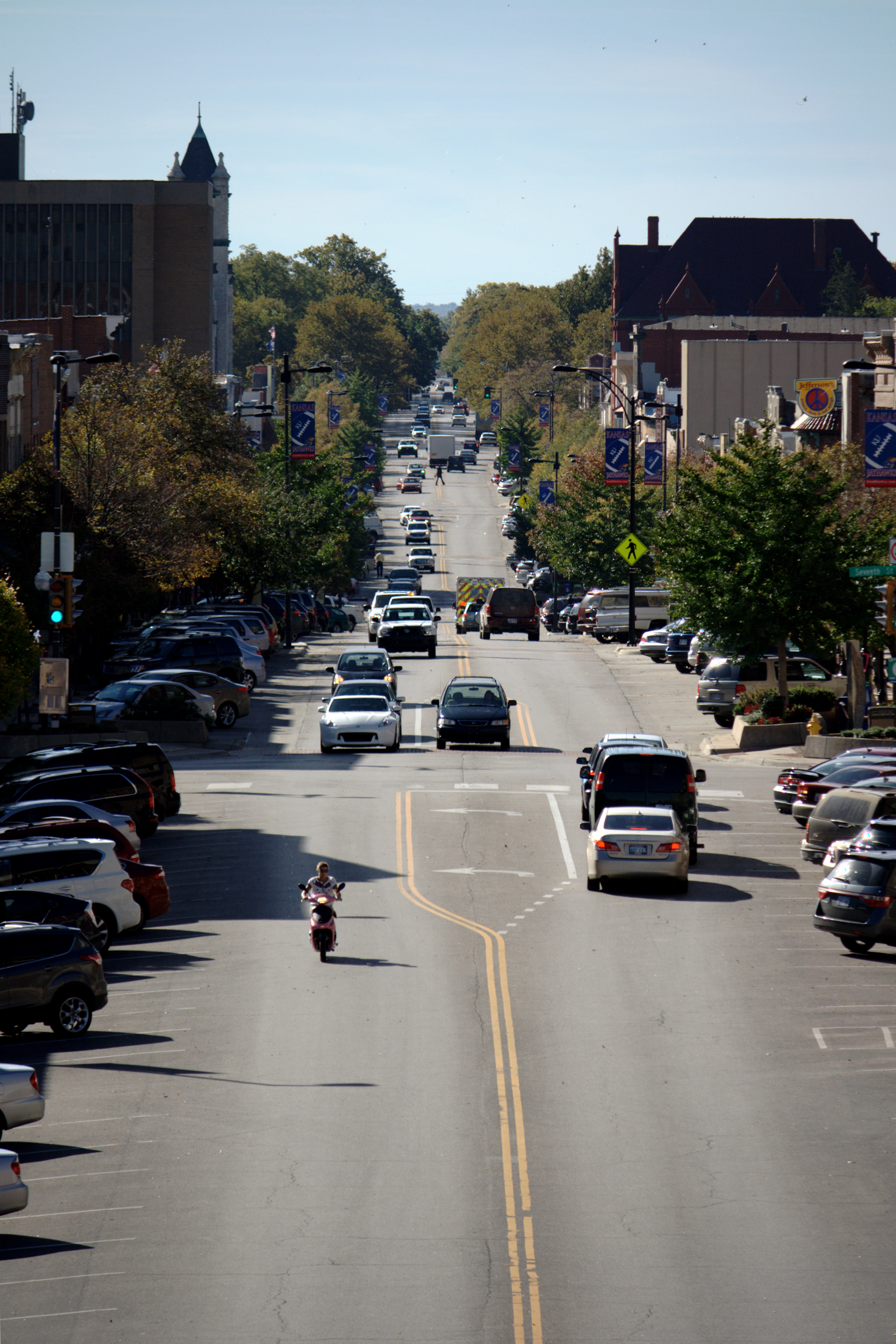
(2014) Massachusetts Street. Lawrence, Kansas

== The ballpark ==
The Lawrence Jayhawks played minor league home games at the South Massachusetts Street Ballpark. Opened in 1886, the ballpark was also referred to as "League Park" when the Jayhawks played there in 1893. The ballpark was located between Massachusetts and New Hampshire Streets (on the west and east) and between 14th and 15th Streets. Today, the site hosts Liberty Memorial Central Middle School at 1400 Massachusetts Street, Lawrence, Kansas.

== Year–by–year record ==
Year	Record	Finish	Manager	Playoffs/Notes
1893	7–12	4th	John Rodemaker / John Hayden	League folded June 20

== Notable alumni ==
- Pearce Chiles (1893)
- Bill Kemmer (1893)
- Charlie Krehmeyer (1893)

== See also ==
- Lawrence Jayhawks players
