= Hobart–Detter Field =

Baseball park in Hutchinson, Kansas

Hobart-Detter Field
- Location within Kansas
- Former names: Carey Park Diamond (1928-1961); Bud Detter Field (1962-1990)
- Address: 9 Emerson Loop East, Hutchinson, Kansas 67505, United States
- Location: Bounded by the Arkansas River (west side), Emmerson Loop (east side), within Carey Park
- Coordinates: 38°01′42″N 97°55′31″W
- Capacity: 600
- Field size: Left field: 330 ft (100 m); Left Center: 380 ft (120 m); Right field: 330 ft (100 m)

Construction
- Opened: 1928
- Renovated: 1932, 1949, 1980, 1991, 2015

Tenants
- Hutchinson Miners 1932; Hutchinson Wheatshockers 1932-1933; Hutchinson Larks 1934-1938; Hutchinson Pirates 1939-1942; Hutchinson Cubs 1946-1948; Hutchinson Elks 1949-1954; Hutchinson Broncos 1970-1984; Hutchinson Cardinals 1985-1989; Kansas State Wildcats 1999; Hutchinson Blue Dragons 1975-present Hutchinson High School Salt Hawks; NBC World Series 1977-1984, 2003, 2021-present Hutchinson Monarchs 2019-present

Hobart-Detter Field is an amateur baseball park in Hutchinson, Kansas, which hosted minor league teams in the Western Association from 1932 to 1959 and teams in the Jayhawk League from 1970 to 1989. The ballpark currently hosts part of the National Baseball Congress World Series, Hutchinson Community College Blue Dragons, Hutchinson High School Salt Hawks, American Legion, and other amateur baseball tournaments. The ballpark was built in 1928 as Carey Park Diamond and has been renovated many times over the years. The field was renamed Detter Field in 1962 in honor of Wilbur "Bud" Detter.

== History ==
In 1932, the first summer of the new stadium, Carey Park Diamond hosted two unaffiliated minor league teams in the Western Association: the Hutchinson Miners, who moved from Muskogee, Oklahoma June 8 and disbanded July 18, and the Hutchinson Wheat Shockers, who moved from Independence, Kansas July 20. The Hutchinson Wheat Shockers played the 1933 season in the Western League, as an affiliate of the Detroit Tigers, and disbanded at the end of the season. Carey Park Diamond was home the home of the Hutchinson Larks from 1934 to 1938, who were affiliated with the St. Louis Cardinals in 1934 and the Pittsburgh Pirates starting in 1935. The team was renamed the Hutchinson Pirates in 1939, and played in Hutchinson through the 1942 season. The Chicago Cubs brought Western Association baseball back with the Hutchinson Cubs who played from 1946 to 1948. A storm damaged the park after the 1948 season, but the Elks Club helped sponsor the renamed Hutchinson Elks, affiliate of the Pirates, who would be the last minor league baseball team to play in Hutchinson, playing from 1949 to 1954.

Nelson Hobart brought summer collegiate baseball to Bud Detter Field in 1970, in the form of the Hutchinson Broncos of the Jayhawk League. The Broncos played at then Detter Field from 1970 to 1984, when they moved to Wichita. In 1980, Hobart renovated the stadium with new light towers, 90 feet of new bleachers, a press box, and a new scoreboard. In 1990, Detter Field was renovated again and renamed Hobart-Detter Field. Bill Canfield brought summer collegiate baseball back to Detter Field with the Hutchinson Cardinals, who played in the Jayhawk League from 1985 to 1989.

In 1999, the Kansas State Wildcats played a series against the Texas Pan-American Broncs and their series against the Wichita State Shockers at Hobart-Detter Field, as renovations of their on-campus stadium were still being made when the Wildcat's season started, bring NCAA Division 1 baseball to Hutchinson for the first time.

Since 2020, Hobart-Detter Field, along with Wichita State's Eck Stadium, have hosted the National Baseball Congress World Series. Hobart-Detter Field had previously served as a secondary site for the NBC World Series over the years, including 2003.
