= Muskogee Navigators =

The Muskogee Navigators were a Western Association baseball team based in Muskogee, Oklahoma, United States that played from 1909 to 1910. Multiple major league baseball players played for them, including Pug Cavet, Dick Crutcher, Bert Graham and Paddy Mayes. They were managed by George Dalrymple in 1909 and Peck Harrington and Ed Nichols in 1910.
