= Marty Purtell =

American baseball player and manager

L. Mark Purtell (July 23, 1889 – 1970) was a long-time minor league baseball player and manager. He was also a scout for the New York Giants, Boston Braves, and Pittsburgh Pirates.

He is the brother of Billy Purtell.

A shortstop and third baseman, Purtell played from 1908 to 1939, with occasional interruptions in-between. For example, he did not play in 1914, 1918, 1919, 1925, 1927, 1932, 1935 or 1937. He was never a strong hitter, hitting near the Mendoza Line multiple times and never hitting more than six home runs in a season. His statistical record is incomplete, however it is known that he had at least 1,541 hits, of which at least 190 were doubles, 40 were triples and 12 were home runs. As some say, "Marty was seemingly non-existent in the 1937 season" that also happened to be his last affiliation with baseball until he became manager of the Paris Lakers of the Midwest League.

== Managerial career ==
Purtell managed for 18 seasons. He skippered the Hutchinson Wheat Shockers (1923–1924, 1933), Springfield Midgets (1925–1926), St. Joseph Saints (1927), Joplin Miners (1927–1928, 1932), Independence Producers (1929–1932), Hutchinson Miners (1932), Bartlesville Broncos (1933), Bartlesville Reds (1934–1935), Fremont Reds (1936), Mobile Shippers (1937–1939) and Paris Lakers (1956).

=== League championships ===
As a manager, Purtell led six teams to league championship victories.

Team, Year

- Springfield Midgets, 1926
- Joplin Miners, 1928
- Independence Producers, 1930
- Mobile Shippers, 1937
- Mobile Shippers, 1938
- Paris Lakers, 1956
