= Lou Mahaffey =

American baseball player (1874–1949)

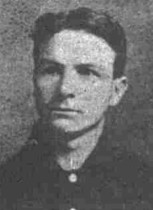
- Pitcher/First basemen
- Born: January 3, 1874; Madison, Wisconsin, US
- Died: October 26, 1949 (aged 75); Torrance, California, US
- Batted: Right Threw: Right

MLB debut
- April 12, 1898, for the Louisville Colonels

Last MLB appearance
- April 12, 1898, for the Louisville Colonels

MLB statistics
- Win–loss record: 0–1
- Earned run average: 3.00
- Strikeouts: 1
- Stats at Baseball Reference

Teams
- Louisville Colonels (1898)

Louis Wood Mahaffey (January 3, 1874 – October 26, 1949) was an American Major League Baseball pitcher who played one season with the Louisville Colonels. He played eight professional teams but only played one game at the major league level.

== Professional career ==
=== Early career ===
Mahaffey's early career was spent playing in many minor leagues in the Midwest from 1895 to 1897. He played in the Western Interstate League, the Western Association and the Western League before he got a chance to play with Louisville in the Major Leagues.

=== Louisville Colonels ===
In his only game with the Louisville Colonels of the National League in 1898, Mahaffey took the loss surrendering three earned runs in nine full innings pitched. Mahaffey made five plate appearances, walking once and failed to get on base the other four times.

=== Portland Webfoots ===
Mahaffey signed with the Portland Webfoots of the Pacific Northwest League in 1901. A few weeks into the season he was forced to change his position from pitcher to first base by manager Jack Grim. He hit .197 with 62 hits in 315 at bats. On the fielding side he committed 32 errors in 80 games. In 1902, Mahaffey returned to Portland where he hit .230 with 26 hits in 113 at bats. After Lou Mahaffey's brother and teammate Joe injured his arm after pitching a 16 inning game for the Webfoots, manager Sammy Vigneux announced he was releasing Joe. Lou Mahaffey quit the team in response.

=== Umpire career ===
After retiring from playing, Mahaffey was hired to umpire in the Northwestern League in 1905. He joined the Pacific Coast League as an umpire in 1906. In 1907 Mahaffey got into a dispute with league president J. Cal Ewing over wages which led to Mahaffey's resignation. Mahaffey claimed other league umpires received $50 to $100 more and was quoted by the Morning Oregonian as saying, "I have never yet worked for less than the other fellows and it's too late to begin now."

== Personal life ==
The Morning Oregonian reported in 1911 that Mahaffey was managing a cafe in Los Angeles, California. In November 1913 Mahaffey's wife went to the San Francisco Police Department to report her husband had abandoned her without material support. According to Mrs. Mahaffey she planned to meet her husband on a train to Los Angeles, but it departed before she arrived to the station. She telegraphed ahead, but received no reply.
