= Otis Brannan =

American football player (1899-1967)

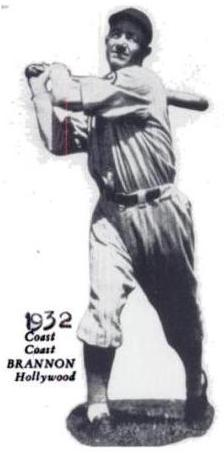
- Second baseman
- Born: March 13, 1899; Greenbrier, Arkansas, U.S.
- Died: June 6, 1967 (aged 68); Little Rock, Arkansas, U.S.
- Batted: Left Threw: Right

MLB debut
- April 11, 1928, for the St. Louis Browns

Last MLB appearance
- October 5, 1929, for the St. Louis Browns

MLB statistics
- Batting average: .249
- Home runs: 11
- Runs batted in: 74
- Stats at Baseball Reference

Teams
- St. Louis Browns (1928–1929)

Otis Owen Brannan (March 13, 1899 – June 6, 1967), sometimes misspelled Otis Brannon, was an American professional baseball player whose playing career spanned 13 seasons, including two in Major League Baseball. Over his major league career, Brannan played for the St. Louis Browns (1928–1929) and batted .249 with 72 runs, 133 hits, 19 doubles, three triples, 11 home runs and 74 runs batted in (RBIs) in 158 games played. Brannan also played in the minor leagues. In the minors, he played for the Class-C Muskogee Athletics (1926), Class-A Tulsa Oilers (1926–1927), the Double-A Hollywood Stars (1930–1933), the Class-D Osceola Indians (1936), the Class-C Hot Springs Bathers (1938), the Class-C Clarksdale Red Sox (1939), the Class-D Lake Charles Skippers (1940), the Class-C Clarksdale Ginners (1941) and the Class-D Lafayette White Sox (1941). Brannan also managed for two seasons in the minor leagues.

== Professional career ==
=== Early career ===
Brannan began his professional career in 1926, split between the Class-C Muskogee Athletics and the Class-A Tulsa Oilers. With the Athletics, Brannan batted .326 with 70 hits, 14 doubles, one triples and nine home runs in 50 games played. Brannan then played with the Tulsa Oilers where he batted .304 with 80 hits, 22 doubles, one triple and five home runs in 69 games played. During the 1927 season, Brannan played with the Tulsa Oilers. In 155 games, Brannan batted .320 with 206 hits, 38 doubles, 11 triples and 12 home runs.

=== St. Louis Browns ===
In 1928, Brannan joined the St. Louis Browns Major League Baseball franchise. He made his major league debut on April 11, 1928. In that game against the Detroit Tigers he did not get a hit in four at-bats. Brannan became the first attendee of Arkansas State University to play in the major leagues when he made his debut. Brannan got his first hit during the next game on April 12 against the Tigers. On May 17, in a game against the New York Yankees, Brannan hit his first major league home run. On the season, Brannan batted .244 with 68 runs, 118 hits, 18 doubles, three triples, ten home runs and 66 RBIs in 135 games played. Brannan spent his last season in the majors with the Browns in 1929. He batted .294 with four runs, 15 hits, one double and one RBI in 23 games. Over his two years with the Browns, Brannan played 154 games at second base and committed 28 errors in 812 total chances.

=== Hollywood Stars ===
Brannan began his tenure with the Double-A Hollywood Stars of the Pacific Coast League in 1930 after he signed in February of that year. During his first season, 1930, he batted .307 with 228 hits, 38 doubles, seven triples and 18 home runs in 191 games played. Brannan led the stars in games played, at-bats (742) and hits on the season. During his second season with the Stars, 1931, Brannan batted .283 with 157 hits, 26 doubles, four triples and seven home runs. At the end of the season, the Stars reportedly contemplated a trade involving Brannan to the Cleveland Indians, but nothing was ever finalized. In 1933, Brannan batted .311 with 217 with 30 doubles, six triples and 17 home runs in 177 games. He led the Stars in at-bats (697) and home runs. Brannan played his final season with the Stars in 1933. With Hollywood that season, he batted .303 with 217 hits, 44 doubles, two triples and 14 home runs in 188 games. Brannan led the Stars in doubles that season. After the 1933 season, Brannan suffered a mental breakdown at his home in Arkansas and was forced to retire.

=== Later career ===
Brannan returned from retirement in 1936 to join the Class-D Osceola Indians of the Northeast Arkansas League. With the Indians, Brannan batted .391 with 27 hits, seven doubles, one triple and one home run in 17 games. After a one-year absence from professional baseball, Brannan returned in 1938 with the Class-C Hot Springs Bathers of the Cotton States League. The Bathers were affiliated with the Detroit Tigers during Brannan's tenure. With Hot Springs, Brannan batted .325 with 151 hits, 24 doubles, one triple and eight home runs in 116 games. He led the Bathers in batting average, at-bats (465) and hits. Brannan played for the Class-C Clarksdale Red Sox in the Boston Red Sox organization. He batted .306 with 118 hits, 16 doubles, one triple and three home runs in 100 games. In 1940, Brannan began his managerial career as a player-manager with the Class-D Lake Charles Skippers of the Evangeline League. With Lake Charles, he batted .261 with 71 hits, 10 doubles, one triple and three home runs in 83 games. In 1941, Brannan played for two teams and managed one. With the Clarksdale Ginners, he batted .242 with 44 hits, 12 doubles and one home run in 46 games. Brannan only played one game with the Class-D Lafayette White Sox, who were affiliated with the St. Louis Browns. In that game, he got one hit in two at-bats. He also managed the Class-D Lima Pandas that season.
