= Martin Duke =

American baseball player (1867–1898)

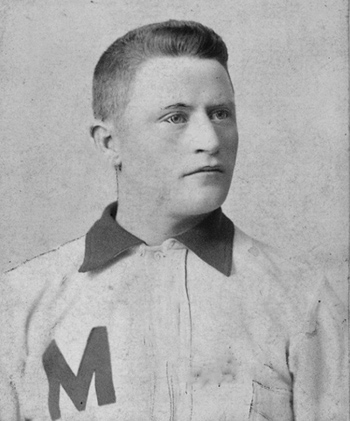
- Pitcher
- Born: 1867; Zanesville, Ohio, U.S.
- Died: December 31, 1898 (aged 31); Minneapolis, Minnesota, U.S.
- Batted: Unknown Threw: Right

MLB debut
- August 24, 1891, for the Washington Statesmen

Last MLB appearance
- September 7, 1891, for the Washington Statesmen

MLB statistics
- Win–loss record: 0–3
- Strikeouts: 5
- Earned run average: 7.43
- Stats at Baseball Reference

Teams
- Washington Statesmen (1891)

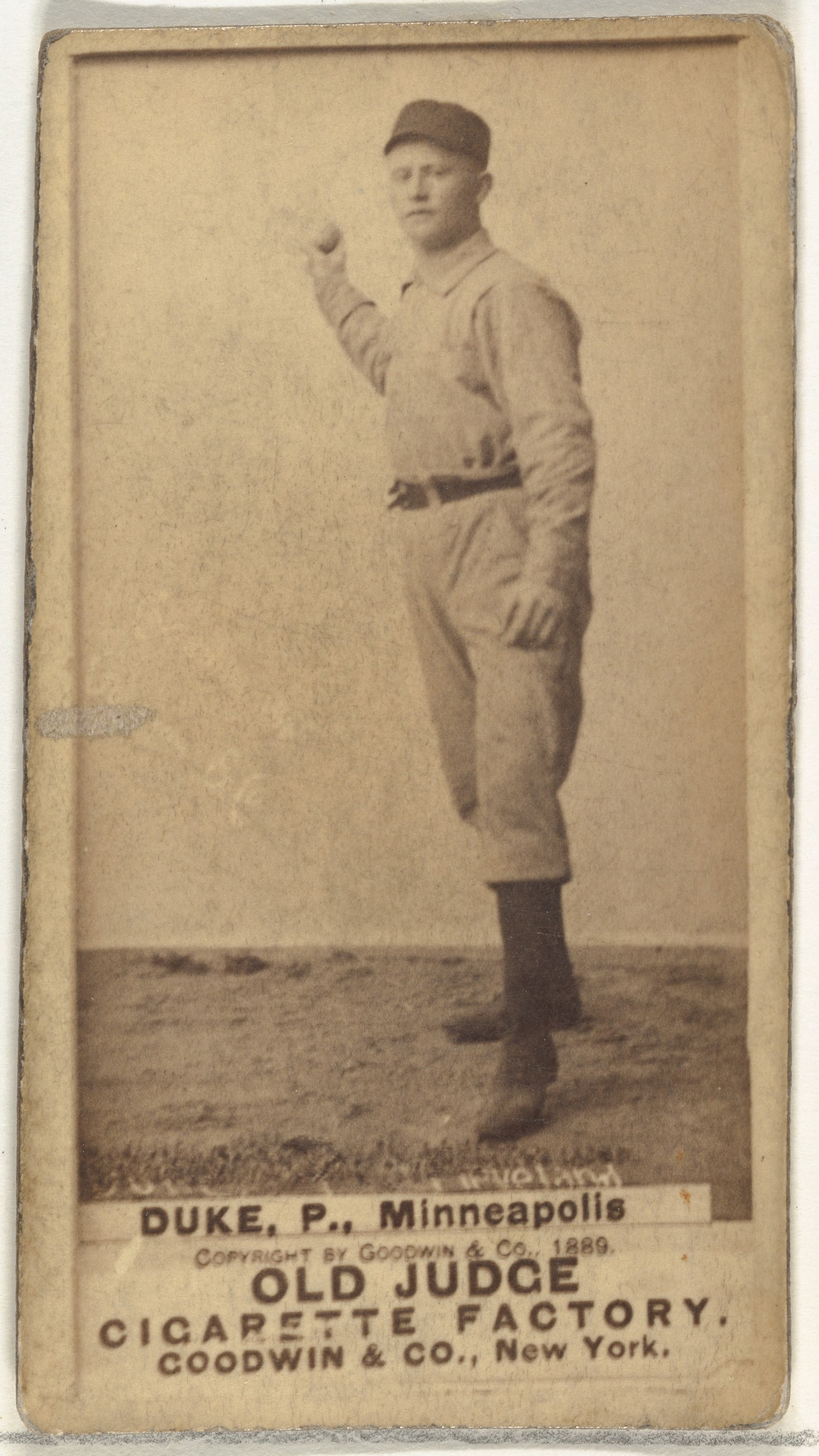
Martin F. "Duck" Duke, 1889

Martin F. Duke (1867 – December 31, 1898) was an American pitcher in Major League Baseball for the 1891 Washington Statesmen.

Duke was born as Martin Duck in 1867.
