= Ernie Smith (shortstop) =

American baseball player (1899–1973)

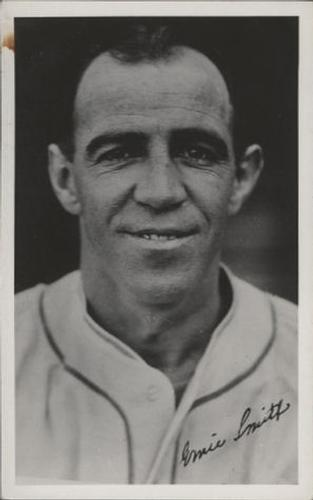
- Shortstop
- Born: October 11, 1899; Totowa, New Jersey, U.S.
- Died: April 6, 1973 (aged 73); Brooklyn, New York, U.S.
- Batted: Right Threw: Right

MLB debut
- April 17, 1930, for the Chicago White Sox

Last MLB appearance
- May 22, 1930, for the Chicago White Sox

MLB statistics
- Batting average: .241
- Home runs: 0
- Runs batted in: 3
- Stats at Baseball Reference

Teams
- Chicago White Sox (1930)

Ernest Henry Smith (October 11, 1899 – April 6, 1973) was an American Major League Baseball shortstop who played in 1930 with the Chicago White Sox. He batted and threw right-handed. Smith had a .241 batting average in 24 games, 19 hits in 79 at-bats, in his one-year career.

He was born in Totowa, New Jersey and died in Brooklyn, New York. His birth name was Ernest Henry Schmidt.
