= Belden Hill =

American baseball player (1864–1934)

- Third baseman
- Born: August 24, 1864; Kewanee, Illinois, U.S.
- Died: October 22, 1934 (aged 70); Cedar Rapids, Iowa, U.S.
- Batted: Right Threw: Right

MLB debut
- August 27, 1890, for the Baltimore Orioles

Last MLB appearance
- September 4, 1890, for the Baltimore Orioles

MLB statistics
- Batting average: .167
- Hits: 5
- Runs: 2
- Stats at Baseball Reference

Teams
- Baltimore Orioles (1890)

Belden L. Hill (August 24, 1864 – October 22, 1934) was an American third baseman in Major League Baseball who played for the Baltimore Orioles of the American Association in nine games in 1890. He remained active as a player in minor league baseball through 1905.

Hill helped found the Cedar Rapids Bunnies minor league team and managed the club from 1896–1908 and 1913-1914. He won league championships with Cedar Rapids in 1897 and 1906 and served as President of the Mississippi Valley League from 1926–1931.
