= Topeka Owls =

- 1886–1961; (1886–1961); Topeka, Kansas

Minor league affiliations
- Previous classes: Class-D; Class-C; Class-A
- Previous leagues: Illinois–Indiana–Iowa League (1959–1961); Western League (1956–1958, 1933–1934, 1929–1931, 1909–1916, 1886–1887); Western Association (1946–1954, 1939–1942, 1932, 1927–1928, 1924, 1905–1908, 1893); Southwestern League (1925–1926, 1922–1923); Kansas State League (1895, 1897–1898)

Major league affiliations
- Previous teams: Cincinnati Reds (1959–1961, 1933–1934); Milwaukee Braves (1956–1958); Chicago White Sox (1953–1954); Chicago Cubs (1951–1952); St. Louis Browns (1939–1940, 1930); St. Louis Cardinals (1927–1928)

Minor league titles
- League titles: 1961, 1951, 1925, 1887

Team data
- Previous names: Topeka Reds (1960–1961); Topeka Hawks (1956–1959); Topeka Owls (1946–1954, 1939–1942); Topeka Senators (1933–1934, 1930–1931, 1924–1926); Topeka Jayhawks (1932, 1927–1929, 1909–1915); Topeka Kaws (1922–1923); Topeka Savages (1916); Topeka White Sox (1905–1908); Topeka Saints (1904); Topeka Colts (1897); Topeka Populists (1893); Topeka Giants (1895, 1898); Topeka Capitals (1886, 1893)
- Previous parks: Topeka Baseball Park; Freefair Park; Owl Ballpark (1939–1961)

The Topeka Owls was the primary name of the minor league baseball franchise based in Topeka, Kansas, USA.

== History ==
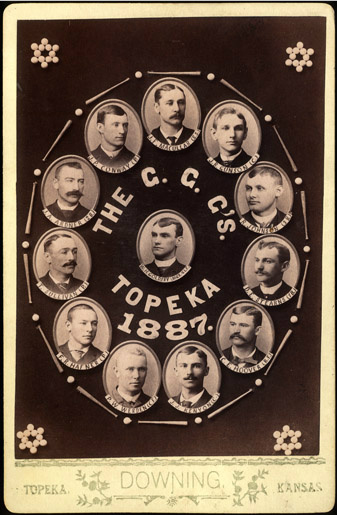
1887 Topeka "Golden" Giants

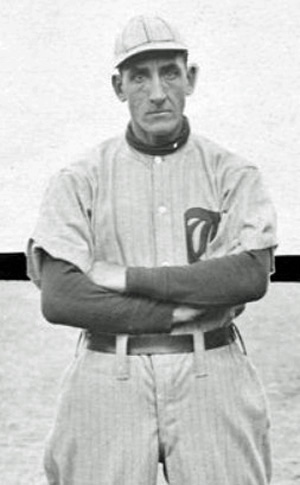
Joe Rickert, Topeka 1912

Topeka first began professional play in 1886 as the Topeka Capitals and had numerous names throughout their existence as a minor league team. Topeka was called the Topeka Reds (1960–1961), Topeka Hawks (1956–1959), Topeka Owls (1946–1954, 1939–1942), Topeka Senators (1933–1934, 1930–1931, 1924–1926), Topeka Jayhawks (1932, 1927–1929, 1909–1915), Topeka Kaws (1922–1923), Topeka Savages (1916), Topeka White Sox (1905–1908), Topeka Saints (1904), Topeka Colts (1897), Topeka Populists (1893), Topeka Giants (1895, 1898) and the Topeka Capitals (1886, 1893).

Topeka competed in various leagues with various Major League Baseball affiliations. Topeka competed as a member the Illinois–Indiana–Iowa League (1959–1961), Western League (1956–1958, 1933–1934, 1929–1931, 1909–1916, 1886–1887), Western Association (1946–1954, 1939–1942, 1932, 1927–1928, 1924, 1905–1908, 1893), Southwestern League (1925–1926, 1922–1923), and the Kansas State League (1895, 1897–1898).

The Owls and their other namesakes were affiliates of the Cincinnati Reds (1959–1961, 1933–1934), Milwaukee Braves (1956–1958), Chicago White Sox (1953–1954), Chicago Cubs (1951–1952), St. Louis Browns (1939–1940, 1930) and St. Louis Cardinals (1927–1928).

== Ballparks ==
The Topeka teams played at the Topeka Baseball Park, located at 15th and Adams. They later played at Freefair Park. Beginning in 1940 they played at Owl Ballpark located at North Topeka Boulevard and Lyman Road, at the address of 225 NW. Lyman. The park was expanded from 2750 seats to 4700 seats during its existence with dimensions of (Left, Center, Right): 335-410-315 (1939) and 316-403-309 (1961). Owl Ballpark was demolished in 1963.

== Notable alumni ==
Baseball Hall of Fame Alumni

- Jake Beckley (1910) Inducted, 1971

Notable alumni

- Jack Baldschun (1959)
- Ted Blankenship (1931)
- Dave Bristol (1961)
- Duff Cooley (1908–1909, 1911)
- Vic Davalillo (1960–1961) MLB All-Star
- Debs Garms (1930) 1940 NL Batting Title
- Charlie Gelbert (1927)
- Tommy Harper (1960–1961) MLB All-Star
- Tommy Helms (1961) 2× MLB All-Star; 1966 NL Rookie of the Year
- Joe Heving (1926)
- Bug Holliday (1887)
- Tom Hughes (1905)
- Jim Maloney (1959) MLB All-Star
- George McQuinn (1958) 7× MLB All-Star
- Willie Mitchell (1924)
- Fritz Ostermueller (1928)
- Bill Rigney (1940) MLB All-Star
- Ray Starr (1928) MLB All-Star
- Art Shamsky (1961)
- Gus Suhr (1923) MLB All-Star
- Jesse Tannehill (1924) 1901 NL ERA Title
- Johnny Vander Meer (1959–1960) 4× MLB All-Star
