= Topeka Senators =

The Topeka Senators were a minor league baseball team based in Topeka, Kansas United States that played on-and-off from 1924 to 1934 that played in the Western Association (1924), Southwestern League (1925–1926) and Western League (1930–1931 and 1933–1934). In 1925, under the guidance of managers Bill Meyer and Dutch Wetzel, they won their league's championship.
