= Hutchinson Elks =

- (1934–1942, 1946–1948, 1949–1954); Hutchinson, Kansas

Minor league affiliations
- Class: Class-C
- Previous leagues: Western Association

Major league affiliations
- Previous teams: Pittsburgh Pirates (1935–42, 1949–54); Chicago Cubs (1946–48); St. Louis Cardinals (1934)

Minor league titles
- League titles: 3 (1946, 1950, 1953)

Team data
- Previous names: Hutchinson Elks (1949–1954); Hutchinson Cubs (1946–1948); Hutchinson Pirates (1939–1942); Hutchinson Larks (1934–1938)
- Ballpark: Hutchinson High School (Kansas)

The Hutchinson Elks were a minor league baseball team based in Hutchinson, Kansas. Between 1934 and 1954 the team played in the Western Association. The team first began in 1934 as the Hutchinson Larks. The following year the club came a minor league affiliate of the St. Louis Cardinals before spending the next 7 seasons affiliated with the Pittsburgh Pirates. In 1939 the team's name changed to the Hutchinson Pirates. After World War II, the club became and affiliate of the Chicago Cubs and became the Hutchinson Cubs, winning their first league title in 1946. On July 21, 1948, club then moved to Springfield, Missouri and became the Springfield Cubs.

The following year the Pirates reestablished a franchise in Hutchinson which existed until 1954. Under the Pirates, Hutchinson won two more league championships, in 1950 and 1953, both under manager Wes Griffin.

== Season-by-season ==
Year	Record	Finish	Manager	Playoffs
1934	66–68	4th	Boyce Morrow	
1935	68–61	3rd	Boyce Morrow	
1936	79–65	3rd	Dick Goldberg	
1937	78–64	2nd	Dick Goldberg / Dick Klinger / Hugh McMullen	Lost in 1st round
1938	70–67	4th	Hugh McMullen	Lost League Finals
1939	49–86	8th	Jimmy Jordan	
1940	50–86	8th	Jimmy Jordan / Adolph Arlitt	
1941	53–81	6th	Johnny Gooch	
1942	50–76	6th	Walter Holke	
1946	73–56	2nd	Dickie Kerr	League Champs
1947	63–76	6th	Morrie Arnovich / Dickie Kerr	
1948	25–52	–	Frank Piet	Moved to Springfield, MO on July 21
1949	41–93	7th	Russ Sehon / Howard McCormick / Burl Storie	
1950	77–60	2nd	Wes Griffin	League Champs
1951	57–66	6th	Wes Griffin	
1952	70–66	3rd	Wes Griffin	
1953	80–60	2nd	Wes Griffin	League Champs
1954	72–67	5th	George Genovese / Larry Dorton	
