= Muskogee Athletics =

Baseball team

The Muskogee Athletics was a Western Association baseball team based in Muskogee, Oklahoma, United States, that played from 1924 to 1926. Under the guidance of the manager, Gabby Street, the Athletics finished third in the league in 1924, going 97–65. In 1925, they finished in fourth place, going 79–72. They made the playoffs in 1925 under Street, losing in the league finals. They were managed by Walt Kreuger, Connie Fields and George Armstrong in 1926, and went 51–45 before withdrawing from the league on July 20.

Several major league players played for the Athletics, including Red Bennett, John Bogart, Clyde Day, Street, Dixie Parker, Guy Sturdy, Max West, Otis Brannan, Bill Dickey and Earl Grace.
