= Fort Smith Twins =

- 1887–1953; (1887, 1897, 1905–1907, 1909, 1911, 1914–1917, 1920–1932, 1938–1942, 1946–1949, 1951–1953); Fort Smith, Arkansas

Minor league affiliations
- Previous classes: Class C (1922–1932, 1938–1942, 1946–1949, 1951–1953); Class D (1906–1907, 1909, 1911, 1914–1917, 1920–1921); Class C (1905)
- League: Western Association (1911, 1914–1917, 1920–1932, 1938–1942, 1946–1953)
- Previous leagues: Arkansas State League (1909); Oklahoma–Arkansas–Kansas League (1907); South Central League (1906); Missouri Valley League (1905); Arkansas State League (1897); Southwestern League (1887)

Major league affiliations
- Previous teams: Cleveland Indians (1951–1952); New York Giants (1938–1942, 1946–1949); St. Louis Browns (1932); Detroit Tigers (1930); St. Louis Cardinals (1926)

Minor league titles
- League titles: 1927, 1929, 1942

Team data
- Previous names: Fort Smith-Van Buren Twins (1953); Fort Smith Indians (1951–1952); Fort Smith Giants (1938–1942, 1946–1949); Fort Smith Twins (1914–1917, 1920–1932); Fort Smith Scouts (1911); Fort Smith Soldiers (1907, 1909); Fort Smith Razorbacks (1906); Fort Smith Giants (1905); Fort Smith Indians (1887, 1897)
- Previous parks: Andrews Field

The Fort Smith Twins (later known as the Fort Smith Giants) were a minor league baseball team in Fort Smith, Arkansas that existed in various incarnations from 1887 through 1953, playing a total of 36 seasons. From 1911 onward, the teams played in the Western Association.

Beginning in 1921, the teams played most of their home games at Andrews Field in downtown Fort Smith on land now owned by the Fort Smith National Cemetery.

Baseball Hall of Fame inductee Chick Hafey played for Fort Smith in 1923. Hugo Bezdek managed the Fort Smith Soldiers for part of the 1909 season.

== Notable Fort Smith alumni ==
Hall of Fame Alumni

- Chick Hafey (1923) Inducted, 1971

Notable alumni

- Mickey Doolin (1923)
- Harry Feldman (1938)
- Jake Flowers (1924)
- Ival Goodman (1931) 2 x MLB All-Star
- Luke Hamlin (1929)
- Ducky Holmes (1922)
- Buddy Kerr (1941) MLB All-Star
- Pepper Martin (1925) 4 x MLB All-Star
- Gus Mancuso (1926) 2 x MLB All-Star
- Heinie Mueller (1920)
- Flint Rhem (1924)
- Earl Smith (1916)
- Al Todd (1929)
- Gee Walker (1928) MLB All-Star
- Jo-Jo White (1929-1930)
