= Muskogee Reds =

Muskogee Reds refers to three baseball teams based in Muskogee, Oklahoma, United States. The first team played in the Missouri Valley League in 1905. The next played in the Western Association in 1917, and the third played in the Western Association from 1937 to 1942, and from 1946 to 1950. They were affiliated with the Cincinnati Reds from 1937 to 1939, the Chicago Cubs in 1941, the Detroit Tigers in 1946 and the St. Louis Cardinals from 1947 to 1949.

== Notable managers ==
- Jack Mealey (born 1899) -- minor league baseball catcher, who also managed in the minor leagues and served as president of the Sooner State League
