= Springfield Midgets =

Minor league baseball team

The Springfield Midgets were a minor league baseball team that played from 1903 to 1904 in the Missouri Valley League and from 1906 to 1909 and 1921 to 1930 in the Western Association. Based in Springfield, Missouri, they were affiliated with the St. Louis Browns in 1930.

== Year-by-year record ==
Year	Record	Finish	Manager	Playoffs
1903	82–48	2nd	Frank Hurlburt	none
1904	77–46	2nd	F. Smith / John Perrine	none
1906	72–67	4th	G. Bennett / J.W. Seabaugh / John Shinn	none
1907	46–92	7th	F.R. Pierce	none
1908	48–85	7th	D.C. "Dad" Risley / Tony Vanderhill	none
1909	56–70	6th	Frank Hurlburt	none
1921	85–60	1st	Charley Stis / Wilson White	
1922	68–69	4th	Wilson White	
1923	70–74	5th	Runt Marr	
1924	47–112	8th	Charles Schmidt / Alvin Maline / Pete Adams	none
1925	67–82	5th	Marty Purtell	
1926	92–66	1st	Marty Purtell	League Champs
1927	63–69	4th	Harold "Chuck" Funk	none
1928	61–66	5th	Bob Wells	
1929	71–77	3rd	Joe Mathes	
1930	64–73	5th	Kid Elberfeld	
