= Skinny O'Neal =

American baseball player

- Pitcher
- Born: May 2, 1899; Gatewood, Missouri, U.S.
- Died: June 2, 1981 (aged 82); Springfield, Missouri, U.S.
- Batted: Right Threw: Right

MLB debut
- April 18, 1925, for the Philadelphia Phillies

Last MLB appearance
- May 27, 1927, for the Philadelphia Phillies

MLB statistics
- Win–loss record: 0–0
- Earned run average: 9.24
- Strikeouts: 8
- Stats at Baseball Reference

Teams
- Philadelphia Phillies (1925, 1927)

Oran Herbert "Skinny" O'Neal (May 2, 1899 – June 2, 1981) was an American Major League Baseball pitcher who played for the Philadelphia Phillies in 1925 and 1927.

In April 1936, he was hired as manager of the Seminole Oilers.
