= Dick Crutcher =

American baseball player (1889–1952)

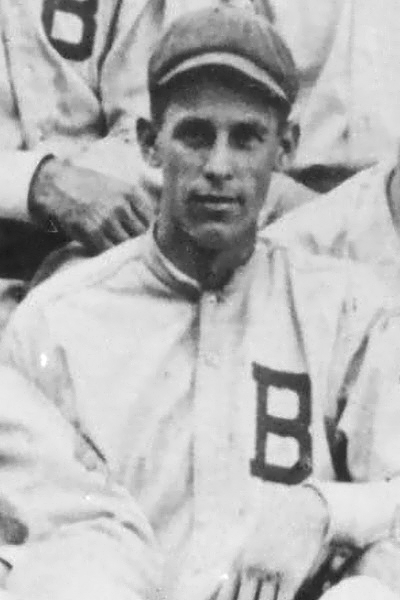
- Pitcher
- Born: November 25, 1889; Frankfort, Kentucky, U.S.
- Died: June 19, 1952 (aged 62); Frankfort, Kentucky, U.S.
- Batted: Right Threw: Right

MLB debut
- April 14, 1914, for the Boston Braves

Last MLB appearance
- June 25, 1915, for the Boston Braves

MLB statistics
- Win–loss record: 7–9
- Strikeouts: 65
- Earned run average: 3.65
- Stats at Baseball Reference

Teams
- Boston Braves (1914–1915)

Richard Luther Crutcher (November 25, 1889 – June 19, 1952) was an American former Major League Baseball pitcher. He played two seasons with the Boston Braves from 1914 to 1915.
