= Southwestern League =

Group of Minor League Baseball leagues (1887–1957)

- Formerly: Longhorn League
- Classification: Independent (1887); Class D (1904, 1921); Class C (1922–1923); Class D (1924–1926); Class B (1956–1957)
- Sport: Minor League Baseball
- First season: 1887
- Folded: 1957
- Replaced by: Sophomore League
- President: Will Kimmel (1904); D.F. Smith (1904); Ensley Barbour (1921–1923); J.W. Harris (1924); Dale Gear (1925–1926); W. J. Green (1956–1957)
- No. of teams: 42
- Country: United States of America
- Most titles: 2 Hobbs Sports

The Southwestern League was the name of four former minor league baseball leagues that operated in the Southwestern United States. The second league, also known as the Oklahoma State League, was in operation for the 1904 season. The third league operated from 1921 to 1926. The fourth league, formerly the Longhorn League, operated from 1956 to 1957 before changing its name to the Sophomore League.

== Southwestern League (1889) ==
Southwestern League
- Sport: Baseball
- First season: 1889
- Country: United States

=== Member teams ===
==== Former ====
The following teams were members of the first Southwestern League (in alphabetical order):

- Shreveport Grays – 1889

== Southwestern League (1904) ==
Southwestern League
- Sport: Baseball
- First season: 1904
- Folded: 1904
- Country: United States

=== Member teams ===
==== Former ====
The following teams were members of the second Southwestern League (in alphabetical order):

- Chickasha Indians – 1904
- El Reno Indians – 1904
- Enid Evangelists – 1904
- Guthrie Blues – 1904
- Oklahoma City Mets – 1904
- Shawnee Browns – 1904
- Tulsa Indians (later renamed Tulsa Redmen) – 1904

== Southwestern League (1921-26) ==
Southwestern League
- Sport: Baseball
- First season: 1921
- Folded: 1926
- Country: United States

In 1923, Mose Solomon hit 49 home runs for Hutchinson, according to Topps and the 1977 card back of Paul Blair.

=== Member teams ===
==== Former ====
The following teams were members of the third Southwestern League (in alphabetical order):

- Arkansas City Osages - 1924–26
- Bartlesville Bearcats - 1923; Bartlesville Braves - 1921; Bartlesville Grays - 1922
- Blackwell Blues - 1924; Blackwell Gassers - 1925–26
- Coffeyville Refiners - 1921–24
- Cushing Oilers - 1921; Cushing Refiners - 1925
- Emporia Traders - 1924
- Enid Harvesters - 1924; Enid Boosters - 1925–26
- Eureka Oilers - 1924; 1926
- Hutchinson Wheat Shockers - 1922–23
- Independence Producers - 1921–24
- Miami Indians - 1921
- Muskogee Mets - 1921–23
- Newton Railroaders - 1924
- Ottawa Chiefs- 1924
- Parsons Parsons - 1921
- Pittsburg (KS) Pirates - 1921
- Ponca City Poncans - 1926
- Salina Millers - 1922–26
- Sapulpa Sappers - 1921–22; Sapulpa Yanks - 1923
- Shawnee Braves - 1925
- Topeka Kaws - 1922–23; Topeka Senators - 1925–26

== Southwestern League (1956-57) ==
Southwestern League
- Sport: Baseball
- First season: 1956
- Folded: 1957
- Country: United States

=== History ===
In 1947 the Longhorn League began play with teams in New Mexico and Texas. In 1956 the league changed its name to the Southwestern League, played for two seasons, and then changed its name again (to the Sophomore League). The 1957 season ended with only four teams.

=== Member teams ===
==== Former ====
The following teams were members of the fourth Southwestern League (in alphabetical order):

- Ballinger Westerners - 1956–1957
- Carlsbad Potashers - 1956–1957
- Clovis Pioneers - 1956/ Clovis Redlegs - 1957
- El Paso Texans - 1956–1957
- Hobbs Sports - 1956–1957
- Midland Indians - 1956, then the Midland/Lamesa Indians - 1957
- Pampa Oilers - 1956–1957
- Plainview Ponies - 1956–1957
- Pueblo Braves - 1956–1957
- Roswell Rockets - 1956
- San Angelo Colts - 1956–1957
