= Hutchinson Wheat Shockers =

American minor league baseball team

Information
- League: Class A Western League 1917-1918; Class C Southwestern League (1922-23); Class C Western Association (1924-1932); Class A Western League (1933)
- Location: Hutchinson, Kansas
- Ballpark: Hobart–Detter Field (1932-1933)
- Founded: 1922
- Folded: 1932

The Hutchinson Wheat Shockers were a minor league baseball team based in Hutchinson, Kansas, in the United States. It played from 1917 to 1918 in the Class A Western League, from 1922 to 1923 in the Class C Southwestern League, and from 1924 to 1932 in the Class C Western Association before a final season in the Western League in 1933. The team ultimately disbanded due to a combination of the Great Depression and dust storms.

Marty Purtell managed the team from 1923–24, and in 1933. Dusty Boggess managed the team in 1932.

== Notable players ==
- Bill Bagwell (1895–1976), nicknamed "Big Bill", left fielder.
- Eddie Pick (1899–1967), third baseman.
- Mose Solomon (1900–1966), nicknamed the "Rabbi of Swat" and "the Jewish Babe Ruth," in 1923 hit 49 home runs (a new minor league record) and led the league with a .421 batting average, while he playing primarily first base and right field.
