= Independence Producers =

American professional baseball team

Information
- League: Southwestern League (1921–1924); Western Association (1925, 1928–1932)
- Location: Independence, Kansas, United States
- Founded: 1921
- Folded: 1932

The Independence Producers were a minor league baseball team based in Independence, Kansas, United States, that played from 1921 to 1925 and from 1928 to 1932. From 1921 to 1924, they played in the Southwestern League, and in 1925 they played in the Western Association. They played in the Western Association from 1928 to 1932 as well. The 1921 Producers were recognized as one of the 100 greatest minor league teams of all time. Perhaps their most notable alumnus was Cy Blanton. Glenn Wright, another notable Producer, made an unassisted triple play when playing Major League Baseball in 1925.

== History ==
According to a historical marker, the first night game in organized baseball was played in Independence on April 28, 1930, between the Independence Producers and the Muskogee Chiefs. Since there are some people that are not familiar with the term Organized Baseball, it is important to explain the term. It is a specific group of baseball teams, those that are part of Major League Baseball, and the minor league teams associated with Major League Baseball. Organized Baseball games must follow specific rules in order to be Organized Baseball games. The commissioner of Baseball has authority over Organized Baseball. An Organized Baseball game is an official Organized Baseball game.

Prior to Independence playing night baseball, there was a baseball game played at night in 1880. It was an experimental game between two department store teams, and it would take another fifty years before Organized Baseball would sanction night baseball. There were a couple of exhibition night baseball games in the early 1900s between Organized Baseball teams. One was in 1909, and the other in 1927, but the games did not count in league standings. In 1929, the president of the Des Moines, Iowa baseball club announced to the National Association convention his intent to play night baseball in 1930. However, the first official minor league game actually took place in Independence, Kansas on April 28, 1930.

There was also a novel, incomplete night baseball game on July 4, 1896 between the Wilmington, Delaware and Paterson, New Jersey clubs. Doc Amole pitched an explosive device instead of a baseball to Honus Wagner, which exploded when Wagner hit it. That ended the game in the sixth inning, with many fans demanding their money back. It was an exhibition game played during the regular season, and the firecracker pitched to Wagner ended the game after it went off.

An article in the April 1931 edition of Baseball Magazine stated that Independence was the first team in America to play a league night baseball game. In addition to that, in 1935, The Sporting News pointed out that Des Moines was not the first to install permanent lights, but it was in fact Independence that did so.

The Independence Producers were a Class C minor league baseball team. They had purchased lights from the Giant Manufacturing Company and installed them on light towers constructed on their field, making Independence the birthplace of professional night baseball. By the end of the 1930 season there were thirty-eight minor league teams with lights installed on their fields. Independence was not the first team to play night baseball, or the first professional team to play night baseball. Independence was the first to play an official minor league or major league night baseball game, and they were also the first minor or major league team to install permanent lights on their field.

There are many stories about the night baseball game in Independence. Some claim the lights used were portable, temporary, or borrowed. What Larry Bowman did differently in his research was to look at the actual historic documents for his sources. Bowman found the 1930 newspapers documented the planning, purchasing, construction, and game information as it played out at the time. Many more historic documents and photos are referenced in the National Register of Historic Places Registration Form for the baseball stadium. All fifty-five night baseball games played in Independence in 1930 were documented at the time.

Bob Rives, in his research article, states that Independence "was the world leader in baseball field lighting". Rives also mentioned that the pitcher for the Producers made the first pitch ever under the lights in a regular season Organized Baseball game. Jan Sumner stated that "The first night baseball game in Organized Baseball took place in Independence on the night of April 28, 1930". Sumner visited Independence in 2014 for researching his planned book. He said the lights Independence used were permanent lights, and they played fifty-five night baseball games at home in 1930. Sumner adds that Organized Baseball is Major League Baseball and the minor leagues.

The National Baseball Hall of Fame has recognized Independence as playing the first night game in the history of Organized Baseball. The Smithsonian displays an art gallery label that gives credit to Independence for playing the first official minor league at night. There have even been newspapers, like the Chicago Tribune, that have stated that Independence played the first Organized Baseball game under lights.

The Sporting News disputes this claim, citing earlier professional examples going back to an 1896 game in which Honus Wagner played. It is, however, true that in 1930 Negro league teams, including the Independence Producers, were carrying portable light setups with them and playing night games on a regular basis.
