= Bill Rapps =

American baseball player

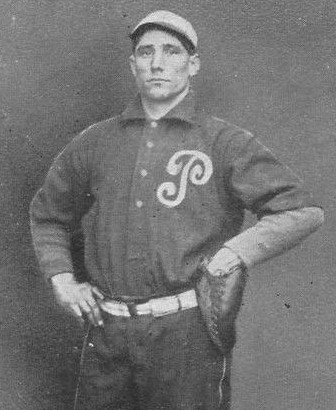
- Rapps in 1911
- Outfielder / First baseman / Utility player
- Born: February 1, 1881; Papinville, Missouri, U.S.
- Died: April 20, 1965 (aged 84); Iola, Kansas, U.S.
- Batted: Right Threw: Right

Minor League Baseball debut
- 1903

Last Minor League Baseball appearance
- 1917, for the Charles City Tractorites

Minor League Baseball, Class A statistics
- Batting average: .269
- Doubles: 160
- Home runs: 21

Teams
- Nevada Lunatics (1903); Webb City Goldbugs (1903); Joplin Miners (1903); Leavenworth Orioles / Old Soldiers (1904–1906); Wichita Jobbers (1906); Oklahoma City Mets / Indians (1907–1909); Kansas City Blues (1909); Portland Beavers (1910–1912); Topeka Jayhawks (1913–1915); Wichita Witches (1916); Colorado Springs Millionaires (1916); Dubuque Dubs (1917); Charles City Tractorites (1917)

William Herman Rapps (February 1, 1881 – April 20, 1965) was an American professional baseball player whose career spanned 15 consecutive seasons, from 1903 to 1917, in Minor League Baseball. He was known by several nicknames over his career, the most frequent being "Roaring Bill" for his boisterous on-field performance. Over his career, he played a number of positions, the most frequent being outfield and first base. In 1907, he was moved to second base and in 1914 became a backup catcher.

Rapps never made it to the highest level of professional baseball, which several sources throughout his career attributed to his behavior and lackadaisical play. In 1906, the Leavenworth Post wrote that Rapps had a "sulking disposition" and shortly thereafter he was sold from the team. The Topeka State Journal noted in 1907 that Rapps was often "accused of being a follower of a vaudeville circuit". He briefly tempered his clownish behavior, but in 1908 he started up again.

Rapps joined the Portland Beavers in 1910, but was sold after three seasons. The end of his tenure in Portland culminated in a public feud with team manager Walt McCredie, who accused Rapps of under-performing in 1912 because he was not made team captain. Rapps was sold by Portland to the Topeka Jayhawks in 1913 and the following year he was awarded the House Cup, which was given to the most valuable Topeka player. Rapps retired in 1917 after last playing for the Charles City Tractorites. Following his retirement, Rapps worked on his farm and operated grocery and feed stores in Schell City, Missouri, and Iola, Kansas.

== Biography ==
William Herman "Bill" Rapps was born on February 1, 1881, in Papinville, Missouri, and was raised on his family's farm. He taught himself how to play baseball as a child by throwing rocks on his farm. Around 1900, Rapps was employed by W. H. Drumheller in Centerville, Missouri, and played shortstop for an amateur town baseball team in Erie from 1900–01.

=== Early career (1903–1906) ===
Rapps began his professional career in the Class D Missouri Valley League in 1903. He played for three teams that season, the Nevada Lunatics, Webb City Goldbugs and the Joplin Miners. Stats for that season were not complete, but he was recorded to have at least 135 hits in 505 at bats. By 1904, Rapps had begun antics that would become a staple throughout his baseball career; his loud shouting and noise-making — which earned him the nickname "Noisy Bill". He was also given the nickname "Lucky" Bill Rapps.

Rapps joined the Leavenworth Orioles of the Missouri Valley League in 1904. By July, he had requested his release, but it was denied. He was moved defensively from the outfield to the infield, which The Topeka State Journal noted improved Rapps' fielding percentage. Rapps was acting as third base coach during a game on May 3, 1904, when his actions caused a Leavenworth baserunner to be called out due to a league rule against "foolishness". Rapps was attempting to confuse the opposing players and cause an error by pretending to be a baserunner. Later that month, Rapps broke his finger sliding into second base, which sidelined him for several games. On September 2, 1904, Rapps, along with Topeka Saints player Nick Carter, were forced to act as umpires when umpire Harry LaFrance stormed off the field following an argument in the fifth inning. Rapps later told The Topeka State Journal that he would never umpire again in Topeka, Kansas, due to the abuse he faced from spectators.

In September 1904, Rapps was given a tryout with the Columbus Senators of the Class A American Association. He was offered a contract from Columbus general manager Bob Quinn for the 1905 season, but chose to stay with the Leavenworth Orioles, who also extended Rapps a contract offer for the upcoming season. Leavenworth joined the Class C Western Association in 1905. Rapps was late reporting to the Orioles, but eventually joined the team in June 1905 after the Leavenworth management increased his salary.

The Topeka State Journal asserted in their August 10, 1905, edition that Rapps' "idiosyncrasies" kept him from being promoted to a higher minor league. Rapps curbed his antics in 1905 as The Topeka State Journal noted on August 19, 1905, "Then there was Bill Rapps [...] But he is not the same Bill of yore. Perhaps he is getting dignified. No more we hear him yell like an Apache Indian when he makes a hit: 'Noisy Bill Rapps, you lucky dog.' No more his: 'Vaaal saaay!' caroms from fence to fence. No longer does he paw the earth and howl himself hoarse. [...] This year he is quiet and says little in comparison to his welcome mouthings last summer." The newspaper gave him a new nickname, "Silent" Bill Rapps. Rapps was fined $15 for assaulting for a Western Association umpire in September. Rapps finished the 1905 season with a .264 batting average. He led all Western Association first basemen in fielding percentage and putouts. After the season, Rapps joined the Sedalia Goldbugs on a month-long tour of Oklahoma where they played local amateur and semi-pro teams.

The Leavenworth Old Soldiers (formerly the Orioles) and the Joplin Miners, both of the Western Association, offered contracts to Rapps for the 1906 season. He chose Leavenworth, but he was late reporting to the team because he was recovering from a broken jaw. Rapps got a $27 bonus (equivalent to $967 in 2025) for hitting a home run in May 1906. The Leavenworth Post accused Rapps of purposefully playing under his ability, writing, "It is too bad that Rapps cannot reach the conclusion that in order to reach the top he must play ball at all time and cast off that sulking disposition which shows itself occasionally." His last game with Leavenworth was on July 26, 1906. The Old Soldiers sold Rapps to the Wichita Jobbers, who also played in the Western Association, for $175. Statistics during the 1906 season were incomplete, but he had at least 122 hits, 19 of which were doubles.

=== Oklahoma City Mets / Indians (1907–1909) ===
In April 1907, Rapps was traded by the Wichita Jobbers to the Oklahoma City Mets in exchange for Affy Wilson. Rapps, who before 1907 primarily played the outfield and first base, played second base at various times throughout the season. In May 1907, the Joplin Miners made an unsuccessful attempt to acquire Rapps. The Topeka State Journal noted continued changes in Rapps' attitude in 1907. They wrote on June 20, 1907, "One of the great changes which has been brought about in the Western Association [...] is the great transformation of Bill Rapps [...] His stunts on the sidelines, those of the comedian order always amused the crowd greatly and Bill was really accused of being a follower of a vaudeville circuit in the winter time. [...] He was nicknamed 'Noisy Bill' by the fans all over the circuit. Now everything is changed. He is no longer Noisy Bill and seldom opens his mouth. [...] The fans who used to know him, in his palmy days as a comedian would recognize but little of the former Bill Rapps in his playing." In July 1907, Rapps developed a carbuncle on the side of his body which prohibited him from playing. He had a .266 batting average with 139 hits in 523 at bats in 1907.

The Topeka State Journal reported in 1908 that Rapps' clownish antics had returned. He was sidelined in August 1908 due to an unspecified illness. Rapps finished the 1908 season with a .265 batting average with 22 doubles, two triples and four home runs in 136 games played. During the off-season, Rapps and his wife, Pearl, resided in Rich Hill, Missouri. Rapps continued playing for Oklahoma City (now renamed the Indians) in 1909, who had joined the Class C Texas League. Along with Indians player Doc Andrews, Rapps completed a triple play in July 1909. On August 3, 1909, Pearl Rapps gave birth to the couple's first child, Rita B. Rapps, in Yukon, Oklahoma. Oklahoma City players pooled their money and purchased the couple a new baby carriage as a gift. Bill Rapps had a .278 batting average for Oklahoma City in 1909, with 30 doubles, four triples and five home runs in 136 games. Rapps was second in the Texas League in doubles that season. He was sold to the Kansas City Blues of the Class A American Association in September 1909. With Kansas City, Rapps played 22 games and compiled a .254 batting average with one double, one triple and three runs batted in.

=== Portland Beavers (1910–1912) ===
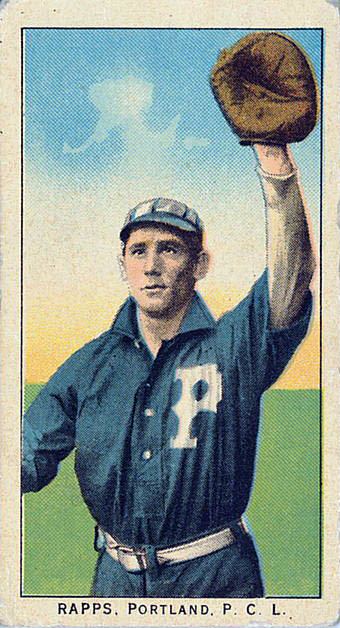
A 1910 baseball card of Rapps

Before the 1910 season, Rapps was drafted from the Kansas City Blues by the Portland Beavers of the Class A Pacific Coast League. Rules prohibited drafting players from equally or lower classed leagues (Kansas City was also a Class A team), however, it was discovered Blues owner George Tebeau never officially registered the purchase of Rapps from the Oklahoma Indians in September 1909. As a result, Rapps was awarded to Portland. Rapps would later admit to sending a positive scouting report of himself via telegram to Portland manager Walt McCredie under a false name. The Oregonian's W. J. Petrain wrote on March 17, 1910, "Billy Rapps, the lanky, dark complexioned first baseman, will win the hearts of the Portland fans from the very start. [...] In the Texas League, Western and American Associations Rapps is known as "Roaring Bill". In March 1910, The Oregonian reported that Charles Comiskey, owner of the Chicago White Sox, contacted McCredie to purchase Rapps contract, but McCredie declined the offer. Rapps did not play for a week at the end of April 1910 due to severe cold. Rapps finished the season with a .236 batting average, 32 doubles, nine triples and three home runs in 207 games played. He was third in the Pacific Coast League in triples.

Following the 1910 season, Beavers' manager Walt McCredie announced Rapps would be returning as the team's first baseman. He stayed in Portland with his family during the off-season. Rapps executed a hidden ball trick putout on Clarence McDonnell during the sixth inning of a game against the Vernon Tigers on September 17, 1911. During the tenth inning of a game against the Oakland Oaks on September 21, 1911, Rapps was struck on the top of the head by a pitch from Jack Flater. The following day, Rapps was called on to pinch hit in a tied 3–3 contest against Oakland in the ninth inning and drove in the winning run. During the 1911 season, Rapps had a .279 batting average with 35 doubles and six triples. The Beavers won the Pacific Coast League pennant in 1911. Following the season, Rapps played on an indoor baseball team in Portland with Beavers teammates Bill Steen, Nick Williams and Art Kruger.

According to The Oregonian, Rapps was sought after by several Major League Baseball clubs following the 1911 season. Walt McCredie planned to meet with St. Louis Browns owner Robert Lee Hedges about a possible trade involving Rapps. In the meantime, McCredie gave Rapps a job working in his Downtown Portland pool hall. McCredie told The Oregonian in October 1911 that he planned to have Rapps on his 1912 roster.

McCredie offered Rapps an increased salary for the upcoming season and he signed his contract in February 1912. That season the Pacific Coast League adopted jersey numbers. Rapps selected one as his number. In August 1912, Rapps was unable to play due to a broken rib. In a game against the Oakland Oaks on September 14, 1912, Rapps completed an unassisted triple play, the third in the history of the Pacific Coast League. On September 27, 1912, Rapps sprained his left ankle during a game against the San Francisco Seals. His batting average in 1912 was .244 with 23 doubles, three triples and five home runs in 144 games. He played in the California Winter League after the conclusion of the PCL season.

Walt McCredie announced in November 1912 that he intended to trade Rapps in order to make room on the Beavers' roster for the upcoming season. McCredie explained his reasoning for putting Rapps on the trade bloc to The Oregonian, telling them, "Fans ask me why I let Bill Rapps go [...] I carried Bill a couple of seasons when he did only fair work. [...] I made up my mind to get rid of Bill, and this is what I intend to do." McCredie also said he thought Rapps was upset he was not made team captain, which caused him to play under his ability. No offers were made on Rapps before 1913 Spring training, so McCredie extended a contract to Rapps for the upcoming season, but heard no reply. On February 12, 1913, The Oregonian reported that McCredie was working out a deal to send Rapps to the Waterbury Spuds of the Class B Connecticut State League.

At the last second, the Topeka Jayhawks of the Class A Western League stepped in and made an offer of $600 for Rapps, which McCredie accepted. He would later say that Rapps lied about his age. According to McCredie, when Rapps joined the Beavers he claimed to be 23 years old, but was actually 29. McCredie told the Oregon Daily Journal, "Rapps better not pull the stuff on [Jayhawks manager] Gear that he pulled on me, or he will be looking for a job somewhere else."

=== Topeka Jayhawks and later career (1913–1917) ===
Rapps signed a contract to play for the Topeka Jayhawks in 1913 and was named team captain. Rapps arrived with his wife in Topeka, Kansas, on March 14, 1913. Instead of joining the team on their final road trip of the 1913 season, Rapps was permitted to join his family at his winter home in Schell City, Missouri. Rapps finished the season with a .261 batting average with 30 doubles, five triples and ten home runs in 148 games played. In 1914, Rapps was asked to be Topeka's backup catcher. Early in the season, Rapps splintered a bone in his right hand. During one of the final games of the season in late September 1914, The Topeka State Journal wrote, "About the only highlights in the gloomy picture was furnished by Willie Rapps with his polite vaudeville."

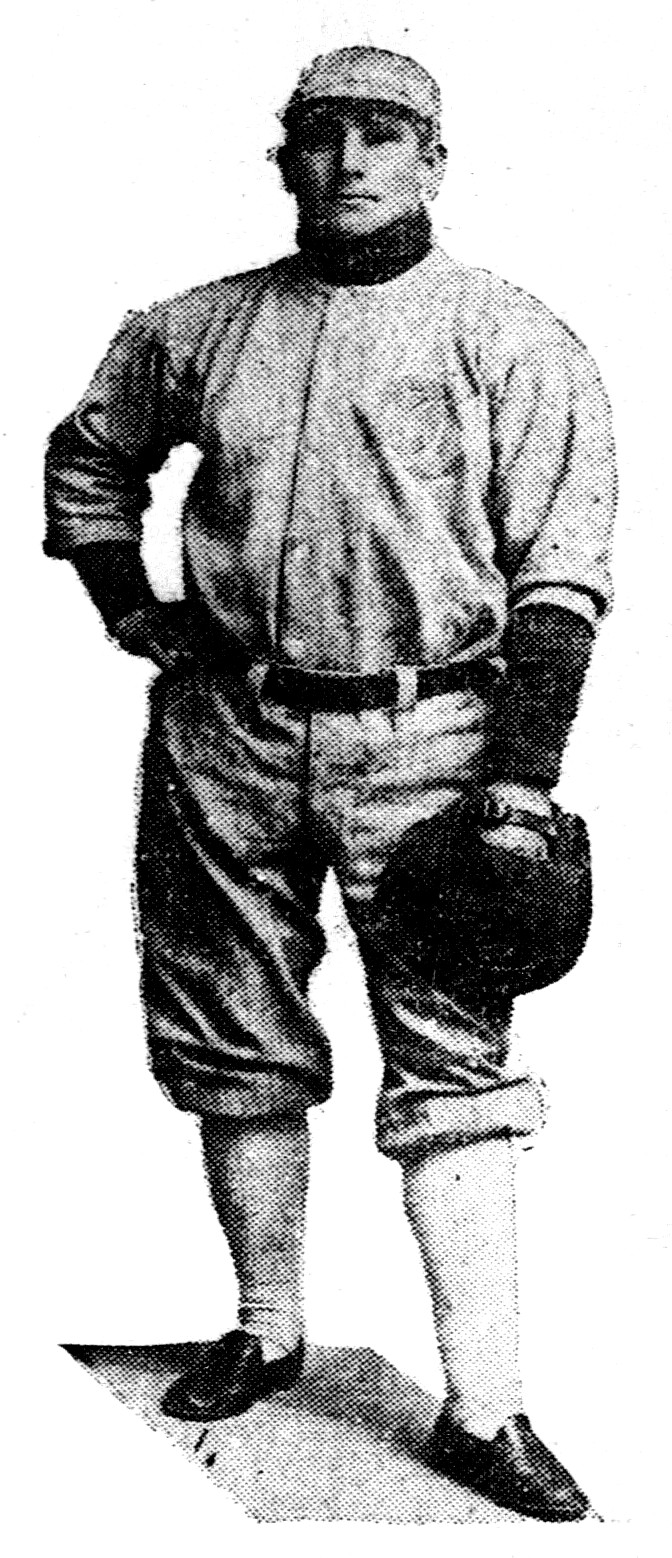
Rapps, circa 1915

After the 1914 season, Rapps was awarded the House Cup, which was bestowed upon the most useful player on the Topeka roster. The cup was donated by and named for Topeka Mayor Jay E. House, who was a teammate of Rapps when they played for the Erie, Missouri town team in 1900. Rapps finished the season with a .307 batting average with 29 doubles, six triples and six home runs in 132 games played. He returned to the Jayhawks in 1915. In the last game of the season, on September 6, Rapps was Topeka's starting pitcher. He walked on his hands upside-down to the pitchers mound and did a handspring to start the game. The game was called by the umpire in the fifth inning with the score tied at 1–1. The Topeka State Journal wrote the game was called for "quality". Rapps struck out four batters in five innings of work. He finished the season with a .253 batting average with 13 doubles, five triples and one home run in 100 games played. Rapps was the subject of a poem entitled Who? written by Topeka sports fan Carl Edwards. Rapps returned to his farm in Missouri during the off-season. On Christmas Eve, Rapps dressed as Santa Claus and distributed gifts to the children of his town.

Rapps announced he was looking to take a managerial position for the upcoming 1916 season. Jayhawks general manager John Savage assisted Rapps in trying to secure a managerial job, and gave him permission to seek out deals and negotiate on his own behalf. In March 1916, Rapps was given his release from Topeka. The Omaha Daily Bee reported on Rapps release, writing, "Topeka will be minus one of its drawing cards this year. Roaring Bill Rapps, human windbag and comedian extraordinary, has been given his unconditional release. Roaring Bill was always popular in Omaha because of his pep and ginger on the field and his comedy. [...] This is one city that will miss him." On April 4, 1916, Rapps signed with the Wichita Witches. The team was managed by Jim Jackson, who was Rapps' manager in Topeka the prior season.

In the Spring of 1916, a tornado went through Rapps' property is Missouri and did considerable damage. His farm was covered by a tornado insurance policy. During the 1916 season, Rapps batted .289 with 20 doubles, three triples and one home run in 134 games played. He re-signed with Wichita in 1917, but on April 30 was sold to the Dubuque Dubs of the Class D Central Association. That season was Rapps' final in professional baseball. He finished with a .274 batting average with 83 hits in 303 at bats.

=== Later life ===
Following his professional career, Rapps continued playing baseball on the amateur and semi-pro circuits. He played for the Rich Hill baseball team in 1919. Rapps was a Republican election judge for Butler County, Missouri, during the 1918 general election. By 1920, he was living with his wife Lillie Pearl and two children on his farm in Missouri. Rapps worked as a manager for the agricultural cooperative Missouri Farmers Association (now known as MFA Incorporated).

The Rapps sued the Missouri–Kansas–Texas Railroad in 1943 for $2,500 in property damage after a fire from their railyard in Schell City, Missouri, spread to the Rapps' adjacent grocery and feed store. They rebuilt their store in Iola, Kansas, in 1946. By 1955, the couple were living in a cottage on the north end of Colony, Kansas.

Bill and Lillie Pearl Rapps celebrated their 57^{th} wedding anniversary on April 7, 1965, at the McAtee Nursing Home in Iola. Bill Rapps died on April 20, 1965, in Iola and was interred at Green Lawn Cemetery in Schell City, Missouri. Lillie Rapps' death followed the following year on July 18. They were survived by their son, Eldon Rapps.
