= Nevada Lunatics =

Baseball team

- 1901–1903; Nevada, Missouri

Minor league affiliations
- Class: Independent (1901); Class D (1902–1903)
- League: Missouri Valley League (1901–1903)

Major league affiliations
- Team: None

Minor league titles
- League titles (1): 1902

Team data
- Name: Nevada Reds (1901); Nevada Lunatics (1902–1903)
- Ballpark: Centennial Park (1901–1903)

The Nevada Lunatics were a minor league baseball team based in Nevada, Missouri. Preceded by the 1901 Nevada "Reds," the Nevada teams played exclusively as members of the Missouri Valley League, with the "Lunatics" winning the 1902 league championship.

The team being known by the unique "Lunatics" nickname corresponded to Nevada serving as home to the Missouri State Hospital for the Insane in the era.

The Nevada teams hosted home minor league games at Centennial Park in Nevada.

== History ==
Nevada, Missouri, first hosted minor league baseball in 1901. The Nevada Reds became founding members of the Independent level Missouri Valley League.

The Nevada team became the Nevada "Lunatics" in 1902. The team moniker of "Lunatics" reflected local industry, as Nevada was then home to the Missouri State Hospital for the Insane. The building was the largest building in Missouri when it was constructed in 1885. The Nevada State Hospital closed in 1991 and the majority of the complex was demolished in 1999.

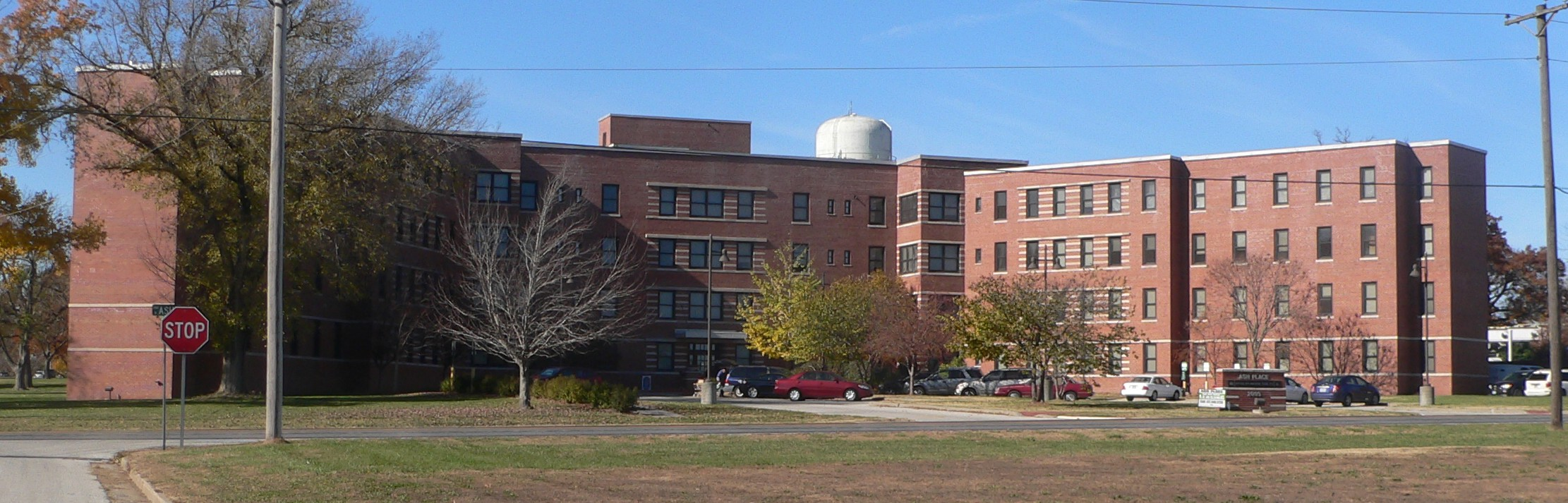
(2017) Ash Place. Former Infirmary Building, Missouri State Hospital. Nevada, Missouri

The Missouri Valley League was designated as a Class D league in 1902, and the newly renamed Nevada Lunatics were the Missouri Valley League champions. With a record of 86–38, the Lunatics placed first in the 1902 Missouri Valley League standings under Manager James Driscoll. The league had no playoffs. Nevada finished 2.5 games ahead of the second-place Springfield Reds (83–40), who were followed by the Fort Scott Giants (80–44), Sedalia Goldbugs (72–48), Joplin Miners (56–66), Coffeyville Indians/ Chanute Oilers (41–81), Jefferson City Convicts (40–85) and Iola Gasbags (34–90) in the final standings.

On August 10, 1902, the Nevada Lunatics and Jefferson City Convicts played a game that featured a double no-hitter. Both Jefferson City's Jim Courtwright and Eli Cates of Nevada pitched no–hit games. The game ended with a 1–0 Jefferson City victory. The rare occurrence has never happened at the Major League baseball level, and it has happened just 10 times within the minor league levels.

The 1903 season was the final season for minor league baseball in Nevada, as the franchise relocated during the season. On July 16, 1903, the Nevada Lunatics relocated from Nevada to Webb City, Missouri. The franchise continued play members of the Missouri Valley League, becoming the Webb City Goldbugs. Shortly after the relocation, the Webb City Goldbugs franchise disbanded on July 19, 1903, after playing four total games while based in Webb City. When the team folded, the Nevada/Webb City team had an overall record of 21–43 under manager A. B. Cockerill.

Nevada, Missouri has not hosted another minor league team since the Lunatics relocated. However, the Nevada Griffons play in the summer collegiate baseball MINK League as of 2024. The Griffons started play in 1985.

== The ballpark ==
Nevada minor league teams hosted minor league home games at Centennial Park. Centennial Park was located at North Centennial Boulevard & East Ashland Street in Nevada, Missouri. Today, the site is still in use as a park grounds and is referred to as the Centennial Park Fairgrounds.

== Timeline ==
| Year(s) | # Yrs. | Team | Level | League | Ballpark |
|---|---|---|---|---|---|
| 1901 | 1 | Nevada Reds | Independent | Missouri Valley League | Centennial Park |
| 1902–1903 | 2 | Nevada Lunatics | Class D | Missouri Valley League | Centennial Park |

== Year–by–year records ==
| Year | Record | Finish | Manager | Playoffs/Notes |
|---|---|---|---|---|
| 1901 | NA | NA | NA | 1901 league records unknown |
| 1902 | 86–38 | 1st | James Driscoll | League champions |
| 1903 | 21–43 | NA | A. B. Cockerill | Team relocated to Webb City July 16; Team disbanded July 19 |

== Notable alumni ==
- Eli Cates (1902)
- Harry Cheek (1901–1902)
- Nick Kahl (1902)
- Bill Rapps (1902)
- Mike Welday (1902)

== See also ==
- Nevada Lunatics players
