= Leavenworth, Kansas minor league baseball history =

Leavenworth, Kansas minor league teams
- 1886–1949; (1886–1888, 1895, 1903–1907, 1946–1949); Leavenworth, Kansas

Minor league affiliations
- Class: Class D (1903); Class C (1904–1907, 1946–1949)
- League: Western League (1886–1888); Kansas State League (1895); Missouri Valley League (1903–1904); Western Association (1905–1907, 1946–1949)

Major league affiliations
- Team: Boston Braves (1946–1948)

Minor league titles
- League titles (1): 1946

Team data
- Name: Leavenworth Soldiers (1886–1888, 1895); Leavenworth White Sox (1903); Leavenworth Orioles(1904–1905); Leavenworth Old Soldiers (1906); Leavenworth Convicts (1907); Leavenworth Braves(1946–1949)
- Ballpark: Central Ball Park (1904–1907); Wadsworth Park (1946–1949)

Minor league baseball teams were based in Leavenworth, Kansas in various seasons between 1886 and 1949. Leavenworth teams played as members of the Western League (1886–1888), Kansas State League (1895), Missouri Valley League (1903–1904) and Western Association (1905–1907, 1946–1949).

The Leavenworth Braves were an affiliate of the Boston Braves from 1946 to 1948.

Baseball Hall of Fame member Jake Beckley played for the Leavenworth Soldiers in 1886 and 1887.

== History ==
Minor league baseball began in Leavenworth with the 1886 Leavenworth Soldiers. Leavenworth played in the Western League from 1886 to 1888. Baseball Hall of Fame member Jake Beckley played for the Soldiers.

The Leavenworth Soldiers next played in the 1895 Kansas State League. The franchise folded on July 22, 1895, with a 7–10 record.

The Leavenworth White Sox began play as members of the 1903 Missouri Valley League. The Leavenworth White Sox folded on July 16, 1903, with a 15–53 record.

Leavenworth returned to the Missouri Valley League in 1904. The Leavenworth Orioles finished with a record of 48–74, placing sixth in the eight–team league.

In 1905, the Missouri Valley League reformed as the Western Association. The Leavenworth Orioles joined fellow members Guthrie Senators, Joplin Miners, Oklahoma City Mets, Sedalia Gold Bugs, Springfield Highlanders, Topeka White Sox and Wichita Jobbers in the 1905 Western Association.

The 1905 Leavenworth Orioles finished with a 75–59 record, placing third in the Western Association.

Leavenworth continued play in the 1906 Western Association as the Leavenworth Old Soldiers. The Old Soldiers finished with a record of 68–72, placing sixth in the 1906 Western Association. The team "Ole Soldiers" nickname corresponds to Leavenworth being home to the Wadsworth Old Soldiers home in the era.

Leavenworth played in the 1907 Western Association as the Leavenworth Convicts. The moniker corresponds to Leavenworth being home of the United States Penitentiary, Leavenworth, which opened in 1903. The 1907 Leavenworth Convicts finished 29–108, placing a distant eighth in the Western Association, 71.0 games out of first place. The team folded following the 1907 season.

The 1946 Leavenworth Braves began play in the Class C level Western Association as an affiliate of the Boston Braves. The Western League reformed in 1946, after missing the 1943, 1944 and 1945 seasons due to World War II. Leavenworth joined the eight–team league, along with fellow members Fort Smith Giants, Hutchinson Cubs, Joplin Miners, Muskogee Reds, Salina Blue Jays, St. Joseph Cardinals and Topeka Owls.

The first home game for the Leavenworth Braves was on May 2, 1946. Before the game there was parade to the ballpark. Students were released from school to attend. The game drew 2,800, despite the fact that seating hadn't even been installed yet at Wadsworth Park.

The 1946 Leavenworth Braves won the Western Association championship. Leavenworth finished with a 76–57 record to finish 1.0 game ahead of the Hutchinson Cubs in the final standings. The season home attendance was 56,176, an average of 845 per game.

Playing as a Boston Braves affiliate, the 1947 Leavenworth Braves had a record of 50–88, finishing eighth and last in the standings, drawing 28,419 fans. The Braves finished with a record of 62–75 in 1948, placing sixth in the standings, with season attendance of 40,639.

The 1949 season was the final season for the Leavenworth Braves, who were without an affiliate. The 1949 Leavenworth Braves finished with a record of 25–112, placing eighth and last in the Western Association, 70.5 games out of first place. The Braves' attendance of 33,132 was last in the league, with the seventh-place attendance at 50,145. Leavenworth folded after the 1949 season and was replaced in the 1950 Western Association by the Springfield Cubs.

Leavenworth has not hosted another minor league team.

== The ballparks ==
From 1904 to 1907, Leavenworth teams were noted to have played minor league home games at Central Ball Park. The ballpark was located at Shawnee Street & North 10th Street, Leavenworth, Kansas. Today, the site is "Wollman Park" and is a public park with an aquatic center. Today's address of Wollman Park is 1300 Shawnee Street, Leavenworth, Kansas.

The Leavenworth Braves teams were referenced to have played home games at Wadsworth Park. The ballpark seated 4,000. At the time, the ballpark was on Federal property that was part of the Dwight D. Eisenhower Veteran's Affairs Medical Center. Today, the park is called "Ray Miller Park." The address for Ray Miller Park is 4103 South 4th Street, Leavenworth, Kansas.

== Notable alumni ==
- Jake Beckley (1886–1887) Inducted Baseball Hall of Fame, 1971
- Raleigh Aitchison (1906)
- Joe Bowman (1947, MGR)
- Eli Cates (1904, MGR)
- Del Crandall (1948) 11× MLB All-Star; Braves Hall of Fame
- Gus Creely (1888)
- Jim Curtiss (1887)
- Billy Hart (1886)
- Mortimer Hogan (1886)
- Harry Huston (1904–1906)
- Virgil Jester (1907)
- Bill Joyce (1887)
- Nick Kahl (1906)
- Patrick Larkins (1888)
- Jack Killilay (1904)
- Charlie Levis (1887)
- Bill McGill (baseball) (1907)
- Edgar McNabb (1888)
- Jess Orndorff (1904)
- George Proeser (1887)
- Harry Raymond (1887)
- Charlie Reynolds (1886–1887)
- Jack Rowan (1906)
- Kid Speer (1905–1906)
- Park Swartzel (1886–1887)
- Art Twineham (1886–1887)
- Tub Welch (1886–1887)
- Milt Whitehead (1887)

== See also ==
- Leavenworth Braves players
- Leavenworth Convicts players
- Leavenworth Old Soldiers players
- Leavenworth Orioles players
