= Jefferson City Convicts =

Baseball team

- 1902–1911; (1902, 1911); Jefferson City, Missouri

Minor league affiliations
- Class: Class D (1902, 1911)
- League: Missouri Valley League (1902); Missouri State League (1911)

Major league affiliations
- Team: None

Minor league titles
- League titles (0): None

Team data
- Name: Jefferson City Convicts (1902); Jefferson City Senators (1911)
- Ballpark: Unknown (1902, 1911)

The Jefferson City Convicts were a minor league baseball teams based in Jefferson City, Missouri in 1902. In 1911, the Convicts were succeeded by the Jefferson City Senators. Jefferson City teams played as members of the 1902 Class D level Missouri Valley League and 1911 Missouri State League.

== History ==
Jefferson City, Missouri first hosted minor league baseball in 1902. The Jefferson City "Convicts" became members of the Missouri Valley League. The Missouri Valley League formed in 1901 as an Independent league.

The Jefferson City use of the "Convicts" moniker corresponds to Jefferson City being home to the Missouri State Penitentiary in the era. The penitentiary held 2,200 prisoners in 1900.

The 1902 Missouri Valley League was designated as a Class D league and had eight teams. With a record of 40–85, the Jefferson City Convicts placed seventh in the 1902 Missouri Valley League standings, playing under managers A.B. Carey and E.J. Miller. In the final standings, the Nevada Lunatics finished first with a 86–38 record, ahead of the second place Springfield Reds (83–40), followed by the Fort Scott Giants (80–44), Sedalia Goldbugs (72–48), Joplin Miners (56–66), Coffeyville Indians / Chanute Oilers (41–81), Jefferson City Convicts (40–85) and Iola Gasbags (34–90). The Jefferson City franchise folded after the 1902 season and were replaced by the Leavenworth White Sox in the 1903 Missouri Valley League.

On August 10, 1902, the Nevada Lunatics and Jefferson City Convicts played a game that resulted in a double no-hitter. Both Jefferson City's Jim Courtwright and Eli Cates of the Nevada Lunatics pitched no–hit games in a 1–0 Jefferson City victory. Nevada committed 5 errors in the contest. The rare occurrence has happened just 10 times in baseball history, all at the minor league level.

Minor league baseball returned to Jefferson City in 1911, with the team folding during the season. The Jefferson City Senators played as charter members of the Class D level Missouri State League. The "Senators" moniker was a aligns to Jefferson City being the state capitol of Missouri and the home of the legislative Missouri State Capitol building.

The 1911 Missouri State League began their first season as five–team league, with the Brookfield Hustlers, Kirksville Osteopaths, Macon Athletics and Sedalia Cubs joining Jefferson City as charter members. The Brookfield Hustlers franchise folded on May 19, 1911. Shortly after Brookfield folded, the Sedalia Cubs moved to Brookfield on May 24, 1911. The Jefferson City Senators folded from the four–team league on June 2, 1911 and the Missouri State League then folded on June 5, 1911. Jefferson City was in third place with an 11–9 record under manager Jack Meyers when the franchise permanently folded.

The 1911 Senators were the last minor league team hosted in Jefferson City, Missouri.

Today, the Jefferson City Renegades play as members of the summer collegiate baseball M.I.N.K. League, beginning play in 2017.

== The ballpark ==
The name of the ballpark for the Jefferson City minor league teams is unknown.

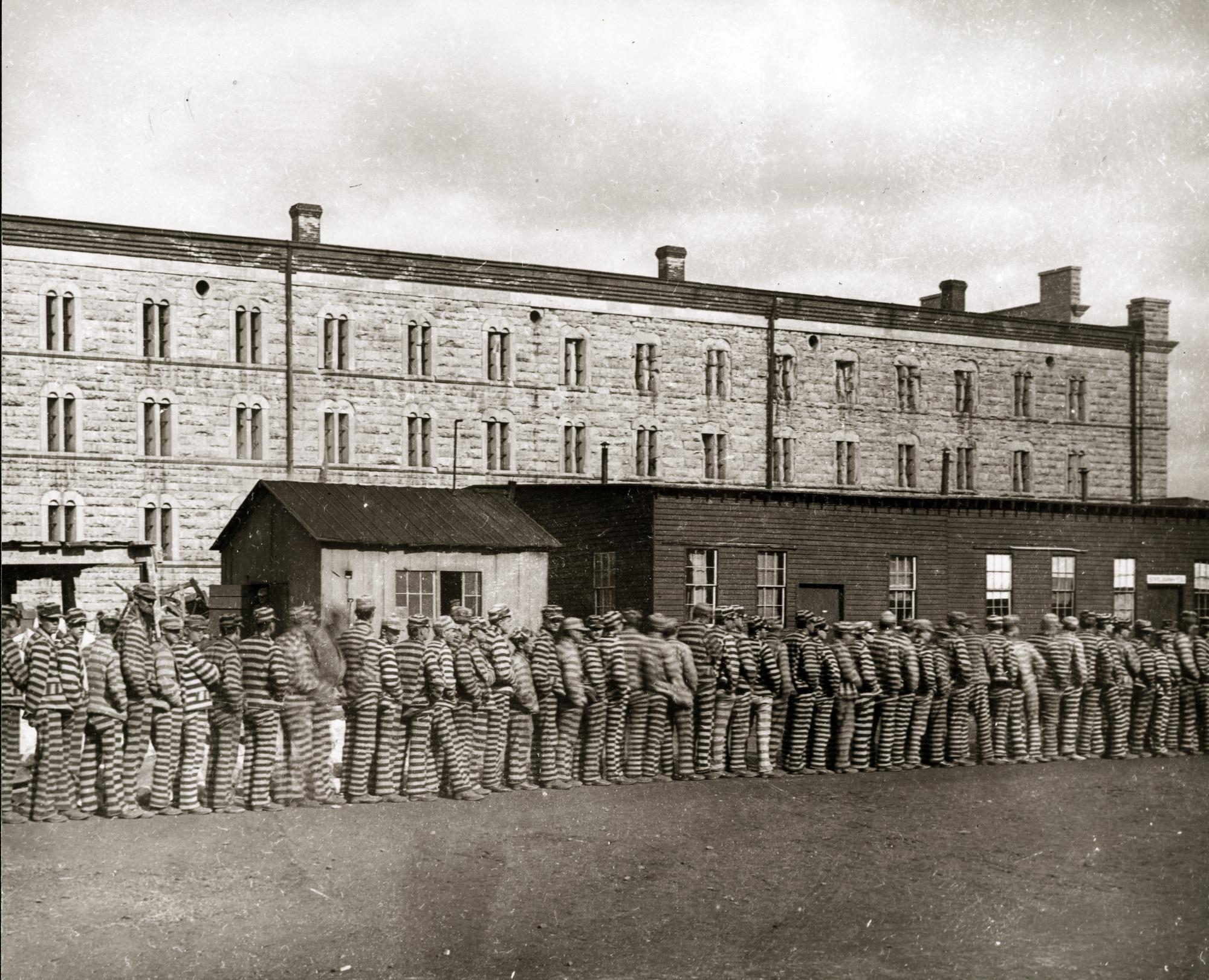
(1925) Missouri State Penitentiary prisoners. Jefferson City, Missouri

== Timeline ==
Year(s)	# Yrs.	Team	Level	League
1902	1	Jefferson City Convicts	Class D	Missouri Valley League
1911	1	Jefferson City Senators	Class D	Missouri State League

== Year–by–year records ==
Year	Record	Finish	Manager	Playoffs
1902	40–85	7th	A.B. Carey / E.J. Miller	No playoffs held
1911	11–9	3rd	Jack Meyers	Team folded June 2 League folded June 5

== Notable alumni ==
- John Halla (1902)
- Jefferson City Convicts players
