= Vinita Cherokees =

- 1905–1906; Vinita, Oklahoma

Minor league affiliations
- Class: Class C (1905); Class D (1906)
- League: Missouri Valley League (1905); Kansas State League (1906)

Major league affiliations
- Team: None

Minor league titles
- League titles (0): None

Team data
- Name: Vinita Cherokees (1905); Vinita (1906)
- Ballpark: Sportsman Park (1905–1906)

The Vinita Cherokees were a minor league baseball team based in Vinita, Oklahoma. In 1905 and 1906, Vinita teams played as members of the 1905 Missouri Valley League and 1906 Kansas State League. Vinita hosted minor league home games at Sportsman Park in both seasons of minor league play.

== History ==
Vinita, Oklahoma first hosted minor league baseball in 1905, when the Vinita "Cherokees" became members of the Class C level Missouri Valley League. The Cherokees joined the Fort Scott Giants, McAlester Miners/Fort Smith Giants, Muskogee Reds, Parsons Preachers, Pittsburg Miners, Tulsa Oilers and Webb City Gold Bugs teams as members in the eight–team league.

The Vinita Cherokees began league play on May 14, 1905. The Cherokees finished the 1905 season with a 41–63 record to place seventh in the final standings. The Muskogee Reds folded on August 31, 1905, causing the season schedule to be shortened to September 5. Vinita was managed by Ed Finney as the Cherokees finished 35.5 games behind the first place Pittsburgh Miners in the final standings. The Missouri Valley League permanently folded following the 1905 season.

Vinita gained a team during the 1906 season, in what proved to be their final season of minor league play. On June 6, 1906, the Pittsburg Champs franchise of the Class D level Kansas State League moved from Pittsburg, Kansas to Vinita. Pittsburg had a 16–15 record at the time of the move. After resuming play in Vinita, the Pittsburg/Vinita team folded during the season and ended their 1906 season with an overall record of 30–25, playing under managers Henry Bartley and William Burns. The team folded on July 5, 1906.

Vinita, Oklahoma has not hosted another minor league team.

== The ballpark ==
The Vinita teams hosted home minor league games at Sportsman Park. Henry E. Ridenhour was referenced as the "proprietor" of the ballpark.

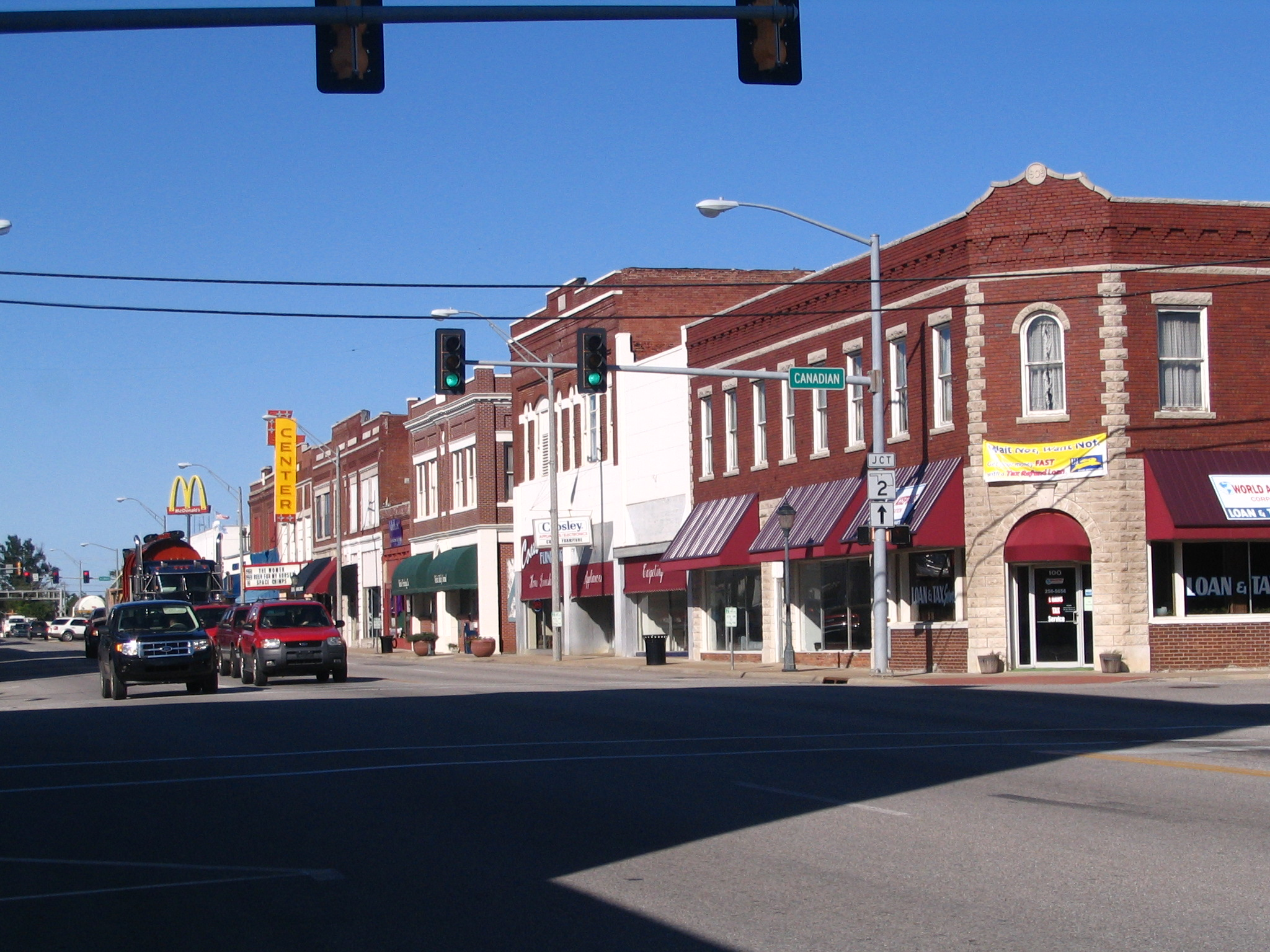
(2008) Route 66. Downtown Vinita, Oklahoma

== Timeline ==
Year(s)	# Yrs.	Team	Level	League	Ballpark
1905	1	Vinita Cherokees	Class C	Missouri Valley League	Sportsman Park
1906	1	Vinita	Class D	Kansas State League	Sportsman Park

== Year–by–year records ==
Year	Record	Finish	Manager	Playoffs/Notes
1905	41–63	7th	Ed Finney	No playoffs held
1906	30–25	NA	Henry Bartley / William Burns	Pittsburg Champs (16–15) relocated to Vinita June 6 Team disbanded July 5

== Notable alumni ==
- Raleigh Aitchison (1905)
- Chick Brandom (1906)
- Harley Young (1906)

=== See also ===
Vinita Cherokees players
