= Dutch Schliebner =

German-American baseball player (1891-1975)

- First baseman
- Born: May 19, 1891; Berlin, German Empire
- Died: April 15, 1975 (aged 83); Toledo, Ohio, U.S.
- Batted: Right Threw: Right

MLB debut
- April 17, 1923, for the Brooklyn Robins

Last MLB appearance
- October 7, 1923, for the St. Louis Browns

MLB statistics
- Batting average: .271
- Home runs: 4
- Runs batted in: 56
- Stats at Baseball Reference

Former teams
- Springfield Senators (minor league) (1912); Monmouth Browns (minor league) (1913)

Teams
- Brooklyn Robins (1923); St. Louis Browns (1923)

Frederick Paul "Dutch" Schliebner (May 19, 1891 – April 15, 1975) was a German-born American professional baseball first baseman. He played for one season in Major League Baseball (MLB) for the Brooklyn Robins and St. Louis Browns.

== Career ==
Schliebner was born in Berlin, Germany, in 1891. He started his professional baseball career in 1912 with the Illinois–Indiana–Iowa League's Springfield Senators. Schlieber bounced around the minor leagues for the rest of the decade, also playing in the Central Association (Monmouth Browns) in 1913, Western League, Texas League, and American Association. During that time, he had a batting average under .300 in every season except 1916, when he batted .310 with 16 home runs.

In 1922, Schliebner went to the Southern Association's Little Rock Travelers and batted a career-high .354. He led the league in hits (194) and was second in batting average. The following season, Schliebner made it to the major leagues with the Brooklyn Robins. He played 19 games for them in April and May before being traded to the St. Louis Browns, in exchange for Dutch Henry and cash. The Browns' Hall of Fame first baseman, George Sisler, was out the entire season with sinusitis which affected his vision, and Schliebner was his replacement. He batted .275 in his next 127 games.

Sisler returned to the team in 1924, and Schliebner returned to the minors. He played five more seasons in the American Association and Texas League before his professional baseball career ended in 1928. In 15 minor league seasons, he batted .286 and accumulated 2,053 hits.

Schliebner died in Toledo, Ohio, in 1975 and was buried in Toledo Memorial Park Cemetery.
