= Brookfield Hustlers =

- 1911; Brookfield, Missouri

Minor league affiliations
- Class: Class D (1911)
- League: Missouri State League (1911)

Major league affiliations
- Team: None

Minor league titles
- League titles (1): 1911

Team data
- Name: Brookfield Hustlers (1911); Brookfield Cubs (1911)
- Ballpark: Twin Parks* (1911)

The Brookfield Hustlers were a minor league baseball team based in Brookfield, Missouri. In 1911, the Hustlers were the first of two Brookfield teams that played as members of the Class D level Missouri State League. After the Brookfield Hustlers folded early in the 1911 season, the Sedalia franchise moved to Brookfield. The Sedalia/Brookfield Cubs team was in 1st place when the Missouri State League folded during the season.

== History ==
Minor league baseball began in Brookfield, Missouri in 1911. The Brookfield Hustlers began the season joined with the Jefferson City Senators, Kirksville Osteopaths, Macon Athletics and Sedalia Cubs as charter teams, beginning Missouri State League play on May 11, 1911.

On May 19, 1911, the Brookfield Hustlers folded with an 0–4 record, playing under manager Ginger Lyons.

Shortly after the Hustlers folded, minor league baseball returned to Brookfield. On May 24, 1911, the Sedalia Cubs were in 1st place with a 7–3 record, when the franchise moved to Brookfield, Missouri and became the Brookfield Cubs. The manager was J.T. Easley. After the Hustlers had folded, the Missouri State League continued play as a four–team league until it permanently folded on June 5, 1911. The Sedalia/Brookfield Cubs had a record of 11–8 and were in 1st place when the Missouri State League folded.

Photographs of the 1911 Brookfield Cubs listed players on the roster. Those listed were: S. Duvenick Pitcher, W. Shadwell 1st Base, C. Hall 2nd Base, L. McGurren Pitcher, H. Norman 2nd Base, E. Armstrong Short Stop, I. Shepard Middle Field, F. Miller Pitcher, P. Acock Pitcher, B. Stewart Left Field, R. Williams Right Field, B. Senior Pitcher, C. McLin Catcher, W. Owens Right Field, T. Duvenick Pitcher, J. Miller 3rd Base, H. Wilkinson Catcher and G.W. Buohl.

Brookfield has not hosted another minor league team.

== The ballpark ==
The name of the home ballpark for the 1911 Brookfield minor league teams is not directly referenced. The East & West "Twin Parks" were in use in the era, having been established in 1859. Still in use today, they are located at the intersections of Main Street, John Street, Linn Street and Park Street in Brookfield.

== Timeline ==
Year(s)	# Yrs.	Team	Level	League
1911 (1)	2	Brookfield Hustlers	Class D	Missouri State League
1911 (2)	1	Brookfield Cubs	Class D	Missouri State League

== Year–by–year record ==
Year	Record	Finish	Manager	Playoffs/Notes
1911 (1)	0–4	NA	Ginger Lyons	Brookfield Hustlers folded May 19
1911	11–8	1st	R.T. Easley	Sedalia (7–3) moved to Brookfield May 24; League champions League folded June 5
