= Macon Athletics =

- 1911; Macon, Missouri

Minor league affiliations
- Class: Class D (1911)
- League: Missouri State League (1911)

Major league affiliations
- Team: None

Minor league titles
- League titles (0): None

Team data
- Name: Macon Athletics (1911)
- Ballpark: Stephens Park (1911)

The Macon Athletics were a minor league baseball team based in Macon, Missouri. In 1911, the Macon Athletics played as members of the short–lived 1911 Class D level Missouri State League.

The Macon Athletics hosted their minor league home games at Stephens Park in Macon, which is still in use today.

== History ==
Minor league baseball began in Macon, Missouri in 1911. The Macon Athletics played as charter members of the Class D level Missouri State League. The 1911 Missouri State League began play in its first season as a five–team league. The Brookfield Hustlers, Jefferson City Senators, Kirksville Osteopaths and Sedalia Cubs joined Macon as charter members.

Macon began play as the league opened on May 11, 1911. The Missouri State League had immediate issues as the Brookfield Hustlers franchise folded on May 19, 1911. Shortly after, the Brookfield Hustlers folded and the Sedalia Cubs franchise moved to Brookfield on May 24, 1911. When the Jefferson City Senators folded from the four–team league on June 2, 1911, their demise caused the Missouri State League to fold on June 5, 1911. Macon was in second place with a 10–8 record, playing under manager Brooks Gordon when the league permanently folded. Macon finished just 0.5 game behind the first place Brookfield Cubs, who finished with an 11–8 record.

On May 25, 1911, the Macon Athletics and Kirksville Osteopaths played a 20–inning game. Kirksville won the game 2–1.

The 1911 Macon Athletics were the only minor league team based in Macon, Missouri to date.

== The ballpark ==
The Macon Athletics were noted to have played 1911 minor league home games at Stephens Park. Still in use today as a public park, Stephens Park is located on Pearl Street in Macon, Missouri.

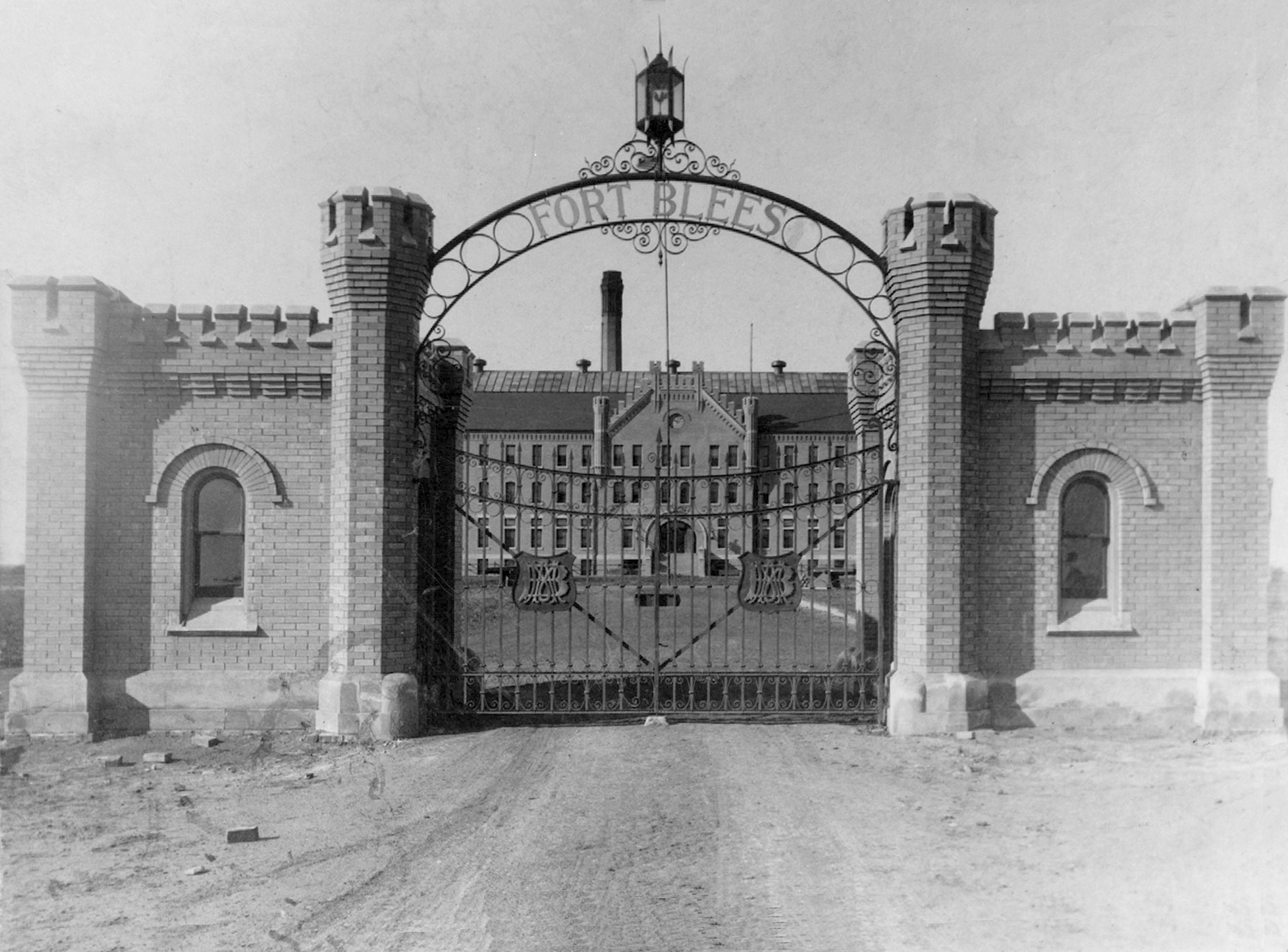
(1900) Blees Military Academy, National Register of Historic Places. Macon, Missouri

== Year–by–year record ==
Year	Record	Finish	Manager	Playoffs
1911	10–8	2nd	Brooks Gordon	League folded June 5

== Notable alumni ==
The roster and statistics for the 1911 Macon Athletics are unknown.
