= Kirksville Osteopaths =

- 1911; Kirksville, Missouri

Minor league affiliations
- Class: Class D (1911)
- League: Missouri State League (1911)

Major league affiliations
- Team: None

Minor league titles
- League titles: None

Team data
- Name: Kirksville Osteopaths (1911)
- Ballpark: Unknown (1911)

The Kirksville Osteopaths were a minor league baseball team based in Kirksville, Missouri. In 1911, the Osteopaths played as members of the short–lived Class D level Missouri State League. Kirksville was home to the Kirksville College of Osteopathic Medicine in the era, reflected in the team name.

== History ==
Minor league baseball began in Kirksville in 1911. The Kirksville Osteopaths played as charter members of the Class D level Missouri State League. The "Osteopaths" moniker was a reflection of Kirksville serving as home to the Kirksville College of Osteopathic Medicine, known today as A.T. Still University.

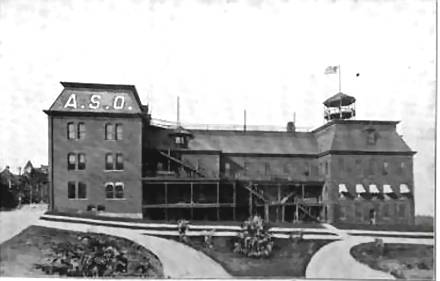
(1911) American School of Osteopathy, Kirksville, Missouri.

The 1911 Missouri State League began play in its first season as a five–team league, with the Brookfield Hustlers, Jefferson City Senators, Macon Athletics and Sedalia Cubs teams joining Kirksville as the charter members. The Missouri State League had immediate issues as the Brookfield Hustlers franchise folded on May 19, 1911. Shortly after Brookfield folded, the Sedalia Cubs moved to Brookfield on May 24, 1911. When the Jefferson City Senators folded from the four–team league on June 2, 1911, its demise caused the Missouri State League to permanently fold on June 5, 1911. Kirksville was in third place with an 9–12 record under manager Senter Reiney when the franchise permanently folded.

During the season, the Kirksville Osteopaths played a 20–inning game against the Macon Athletics on May 25, 1911. Kirksville won the game 2–1.

Kirksville, Missouri has not hosted another minor league baseball team.

A college football team with the same "Kirksville Osteopaths" name played in the same era. The football team lost a game 150–0 to the Missouri School of Mines on November 12, 1914.

== The ballpark ==
The name of the home minor league ballpark for the Kirksville Osteopaths is not directly referenced. As Kirksville was home to two colleges in the era, college baseball was played on the campus of the North Missouri Normal School and Commercial College, known today as Truman State University and at its namesake Kirksville College of Osteopathic Medicine, known today as A.T. Still University, which also fielded a baseball and football team in the same era.

== Year–by–year record ==
Year	Record	Finish	Manager	Playoffs
1911	9–12	4th	Senter Reiney	League folded June 5

== Notable alumni ==
The roster of the 1911 Kirksville Osteopaths is unknown.
