= Carlos Lezcano =

Puerto Rican baseball player (1955–2025)

- Outfielder
- Born: 30 September 1955; Arecibo, Puerto Rico
- Died: 6 September 2025 (aged 69); Arecibo, Puerto Rico
- Batted: Right Threw: Right

MLB debut
- April 10, 1980, for the Chicago Cubs

Last MLB appearance
- June 10, 1981, for the Chicago Cubs

MLB statistics
- Batting average: .186
- Home runs: 3
- Runs batted in: 14
- Stats at Baseball Reference

Teams
- Chicago Cubs (1980–1981)

Carlos Manuel Lezcano (30 September 1955 – 6 September 2025) was a Puerto Rican professional baseball player who appeared as an outfielder in Major League Baseball (MLB) from 1980 to 1981 for the Chicago Cubs. His cousin, Sixto Lezcano, was also a Major League outfielder.

== Early life ==
Lezcano was born in Arecibo, Puerto Rico on 30 September 1955.

== Manager ==
Lezcano managed the Lake Elsinore Storm, a minor league affiliate of the San Diego Padres, from 2007 to 2011. On November 29, 2013, the Cangrejeros de Santurce announced that Lezcano would replace José David Flores as manager of the team.

On January 12, 2015, Lezcano was announced as the manager for the Joplin Blasters as they began American Association play in 2015.

For the 2016 summer Carlos Lezcano was the head coach for the Liberal Bee Jays located in Liberal, Kansas. The Bee Jays play in the Jayhawk League, which involves college players from around the United States.

== Death ==
Lezcano died from cancer on September 6, 2025, at the age of 69.

== See also ==
- List of Major League Baseball players from Puerto Rico
