= Papinville, Missouri =

Unincorporated community in Missouri, U.S.

Coordinates: 38°04′02″N 94°13′37″W

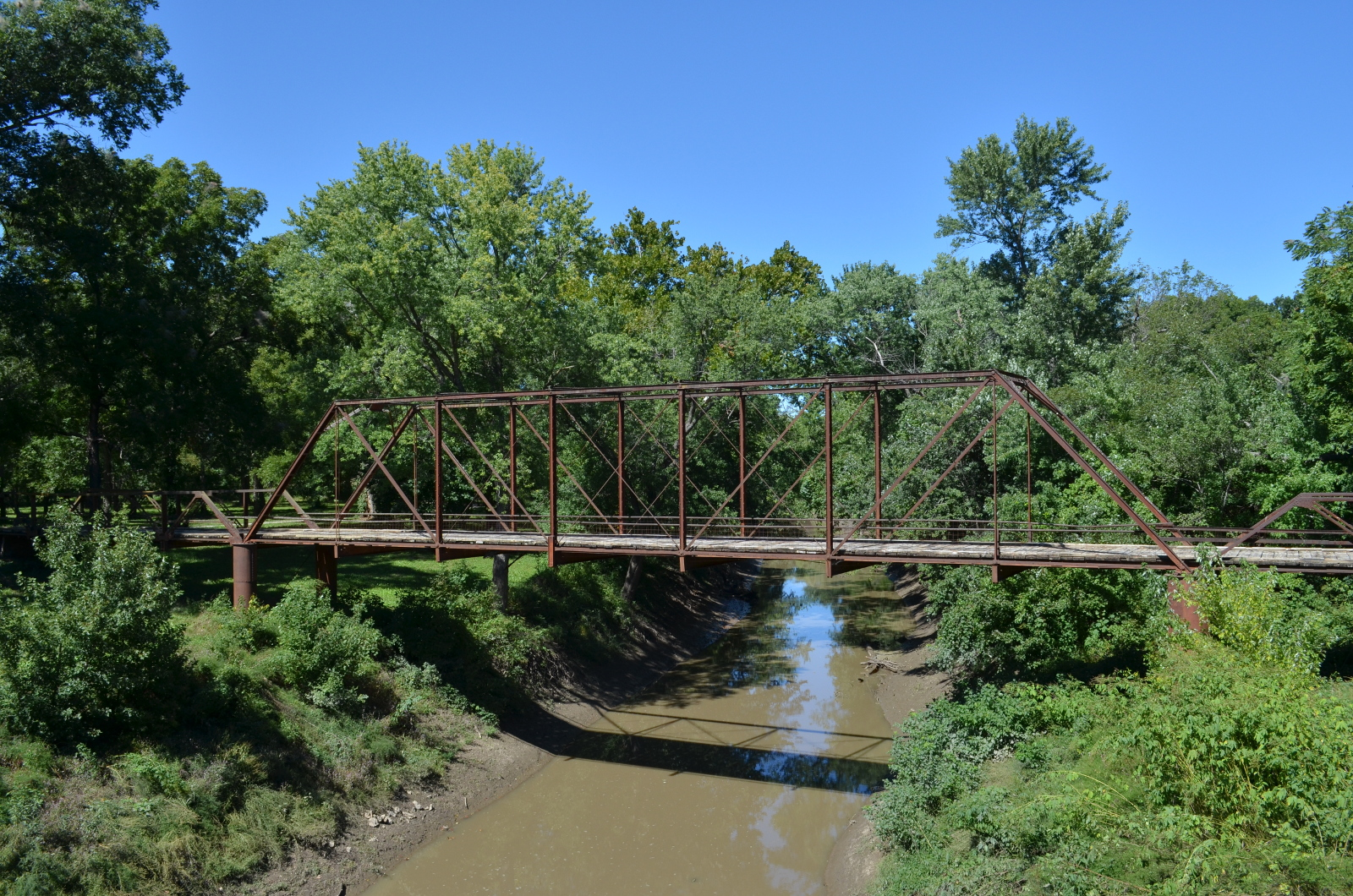
The Papinville Marais des Cygnes River Bridge

Papinville is an unincorporated community in southern Bates County, Missouri.

The community is on the banks of the Marais des Cygnes River within the waters of the Harry S Truman Reservoir. Rich Hill is approximately seven miles to the west via Missouri Routes N and B.

== History ==
Papinville was platted in 1847. The community was named for Melicourt Papin, a French trader. A post office called Papinville was established in 1848, and remained in operation until 1906.

Variant names were Papinsville and Rapinsville.

Professional baseball player Bill Rapps was born in Papinville in 1881.

The Papinville Marais des Cygnes River Bridge was listed on the National Register of Historic Places in 2002.
