= Bill McCarren =

American baseball player (1895-1983)

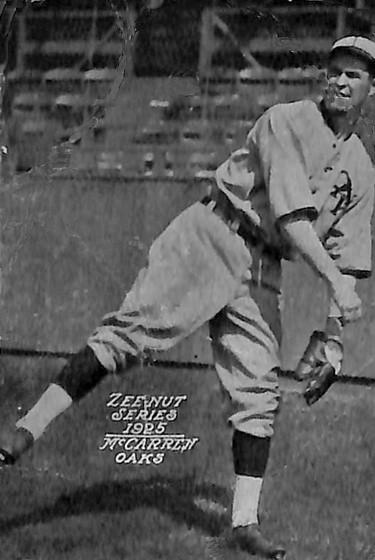
- 1925 Zeenut Baseball Card, Oakland Oaks
- Third baseman
- Born: November 4, 1895; Fortenia, Pennsylvania, U.S.
- Died: September 11, 1983 (aged 87); Denver, Colorado, U.S.
- Batted: Right Threw: Right

MLB debut
- May 4, 1923, for the Brooklyn Robins

Last MLB appearance
- August 23, 1923, for the Brooklyn Robins

MLB statistics
- Batting average: .245
- Home runs: 3
- Runs batted in: 27
- Stats at Baseball Reference

Teams
- Brooklyn Robins (1923)

William Joseph McCarren (November 4, 1895 – September 11, 1983) was an American professional baseball third baseman, who played for the Brooklyn Robins of Major League Baseball (MLB), in 1923. He was later a scout for the Boston Red Sox, from 1944 to 1969.

== Baseball career ==
Born in Fortenia, Pennsylvania, McCarren had a brief big league baseball career, appearing in 69 games — mostly at third base — for the National League (NL) Brooklyn Robins, in 1923. He made his MLB debut on May 4, 1923.

In 1918, McCarren began his pro baseball career, playing Minor League Baseball (MiLB) for Newark of the International League. In 1928, his final MiLB campaign, Mccarren played for Montreal of the International League. He retired from active play, following the season.

After McCarren’s playing days ended, he was employed by Jersey City, New Jersey, serving as the groundskeeper of the high school’s athletic field.

== Professional scouting ==
Some years afterward (1944), McCarren began scouting for the Boston Red Sox. Several of the players he signed made it to MLB; among them are Dick Brodowski, Mickey McDermott, and Leo Kiely. McCarren left baseball for good, following the 1969 season.

== Death ==
McCarren died on September 11, 1983, in Denver, Colorado.
