= George Smith (National League pitcher) =

American baseball player (1892–1965)

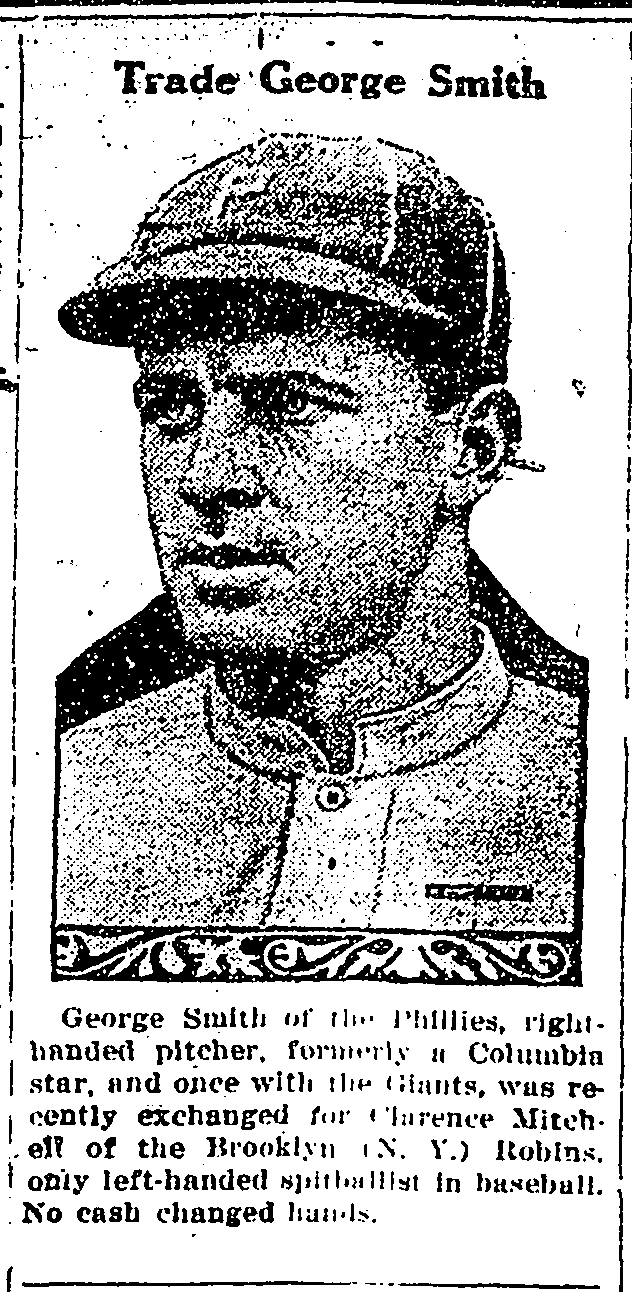
- Pitcher
- Born: May 31, 1892; Byram, Connecticut, U.S.
- Died: January 7, 1965 (aged 72); Greenwich, Connecticut, U.S.
- Batted: Right Threw: Right

MLB debut
- August 9, 1916, for the New York Giants

Last MLB appearance
- September 21, 1923, for the Brooklyn Robins

MLB statistics
- Win–loss record: 41–81
- Earned run average: 3.89
- Strikeouts: 263
- Stats at Baseball Reference

Teams
- New York Giants (1916–1917); Cincinnati Reds (1918); New York Giants (1918); Brooklyn Robins (1918); New York Giants (1919); Philadelphia Phillies (1919–1922); Brooklyn Robins (1923)

George Allen Smith (May 31, 1892 – January 7, 1965) was an American pitcher for the New York Giants (1916–19), Cincinnati Reds (1918), Brooklyn Robins (1918 and 1923) and Philadelphia Phillies (1919–22).

He helped the Giants win the 1917 National League Pennant.

He led the National League in home runs allowed in 1920 (10) and losses in 1921 (20).

He ranks 90th on the MLB Career Walks/9IP List (2.01).

In 8 seasons he had a 41–81 win–loss record, 229 games (118 started), 52 complete games, 5 shutouts, 78 games finished, 4 saves, 1,143 1/3 innings pitched, 1,321 hits allowed, 643 runs allowed, 494 earned runs allowed, 54 home runs allowed, 255 walks, 263 strikeouts, 26 hit batsmen, 23 wild pitches, 4,874 batters faced, 3 balks, a 3.89 ERA and a 1.378 WHIP.

He went to college at Columbia University and died in Greenwich, Connecticut, at the age of 72.

== Sources ==
- Career statistics from Baseball Reference · Baseball Reference (Minors) · Retrosheet · Baseball Almanac
