= Sedalia Goldbugs =

- 1902–1911; (1902–1905, 1911); Sedalia, Missouri

Minor league affiliations
- Class: Class D (1902–1903); Class C (1904–1905); Class D (1911)
- League: Missouri Valley League (1902–1904); Western Association (1905); Missouri State League (1911)

Major league affiliations
- Team: None

Minor league titles
- League titles (2): 1903; 1911

Team data
- Name: Sedalia Goldbugs (1902–1905); Sedalia Cubs (1911)
- Ballpark: Liberty Park Stadium (1902–1905, 1911)

The Sedalia Goldbugs were a minor league baseball team based in Sedalia, Missouri. Between 1904 and 1911, Sedalia teams played as a member of the Missouri Valley League (1902–1904), Western Association (1905) and Missouri State League (1911), winning league championships in 1903 and 1911. Sedalia played as the Sedalia Cubs in 1911. Sedalia hosted minor league home games at Liberty Park Stadium.

== History ==
Minor league baseball began in Sedalia, Missouri in 1902. The Sedalia Goldbugs were charter members of the eight–team Class D level Missouri Valley League in 1902.

In their first season of play, the 1902 Sedalia Gold Bugs finished with a record of 72–48, placing 4th in the Missouri Valley League. Sedalia played home games at Liberty Park in Sedalia. The Gold Bugs were managed by Joe Roe, RL Hawkins, George Allen and Dave Fultz. Sedalia was joined in the 1902 standings by the Coffeyville Indians/Chanute Oilers (40–81), Fort Scott Giants (80–44), Iola Gasbags (34–90), Jefferson City Convicts (40–85), Joplin Miners (56–66), Nevada Lunatics (86–38) and Springfield Reds (83–40).

On July 27, 1902, Sedalia pitcher Paul Curtis threw a no–hitter in a 4–1 victory over the Chanute Oilers.

Sedalia Won the 1903 Missouri Valley League Championship. The Sedalia Goldbugs finished with a record of 86–47, to place 1st in the Missouri Valley League, which had no playoffs. Sedalia finished 2.5 games ahead of the 2nd place Springfield Midgets in the final standings. Sedalia was managed by Jimmie Driscoll, W. J. Ferguson and R. N. Harrison.

In 1904, the Missouri Valley League became a Class C level League. The Sedalia Goldbugs finished with a record of 71–53, to place 4th in the Missouri Valley League. Sedalia was managed by E. E. Codding. Sedalia left the Missouri Valley League after the conclusion of the 1904 season.

The Sedalia Goldbugs joined the reformed Western Association in 1905. The league began the season as a Class D level league and was upgraded to a Class C level league on June 2, 1905. The Gold Bugs finished the season with a 70–64 record, placing 4th in the Western Association standings. They had three managers in Dutch Henry, Billy White and Dick Rohn. The final Western Association standings of 1905 were: Guthrie Senators (66–70), Joplin Miners (65–73), Leavenworth Orioles (75–59), Oklahoma City Mets (77–58), Sedalia Goldbugs (70–64), Springfield Highlanders (54–80), Topeka White Sox (54–80) and Wichita Jobbers (79–56). The Sedalia Goldbugs franchise folded after the 1905 season, as the Webb City Goldbugs began play in the 1906 western Association.

On July 16, 1905, Sedalia pitcher Happy Wescott threw a no–hitter against the Topeka White Sox in a 5–0, 5–inning victory.

In 1911, minor league baseball returned for one partial season in Sedalia. The 1911 Sedalia Cubs became charter members of the Class D level Missouri State League, which folded mid–season. The Missouri State League began the season as a five–team league. The Brookfield Hustlers, Jefferson City Senators, Kirksville Osteopaths and Macon Athletics joined the Sedalia Cubs in beginning league play. On May 19, 1911, the Brookfield Hustlers folded. On May 24, 1911, the Sedalia Cubs were in 1st place with a 7–3 record, when the franchise moved to Brookfield, Missouri and became the Brookfield Cubs. Their manager was J.T. Easley. The Missouri State League played as a four–team league until it permanently folded on June 4, 1911. The Sedalia/Brookfield Cubs had a record of 11–8 and were in 1st place when the Missouri State League folded. Sedalia has not hosted another minor league franchise.

== The ballpark ==
The Sedalia Goldbugs and Sedalia Cubs teams hosted their minor league home games at Liberty Park in Sedalia. Liberty Park had an estimated capacity of 600. Today, the park is still in use as a public park and contains Liberty Park Stadium, the original baseball park and grandstands. The location is 1500 West 3rd Street, Sedalia, Missouri.

== Timeline ==
Year(s)	# Yrs.	Team	Level	League	Ballpark
1902–1903	2	Sedalia Goldbugs	Class D	Missouri Valley League	Liberty Prk
1904	1	Sedalia Goldbugs	Class C	Missouri Valley League	Liberty Prk
1905	1	Sedalia Goldbugs	Class C	Western Association	Liberty Prk
1911	1	Sedalia Cubs	Class D	Missouri State League	Liberty Prk

== Year–by–year record ==
Year	Record	Finish	Manager	Playoffs/Notes
1902	72–48	4th	Joseph Roe / Dave Fultz	No playoffs held
1903	86–47	1st	W.J. Ferguson / R.N. Harrison	League champions
1904	71–53	4th	E.E. Codding	No playoffs held
1905	70–64	4th	Dutch Henry / Richard Rohn	No playoffs held
1911	11–8	1st	R.T. Easley	Team (7–3) moved to Brookfield May 24; League champions League folded June 4

== Notable alumni ==
- George Blackburn (1905)
- Jim Bluejacket (1905)
- Eli Cates (1903)
- Harry Cheek (1905)
- Dave Fultz (1902, MGR)
- Dutch Henry (1905, MGR)
- Larry Milton (1902)
- Ed Reulbach (1902–1904)
- Ray Rolling (1905)
- Frosty Thomas (1902)

== See also ==
Sedalia Goldbugs players
