= Gabe Suárez =

Spanish baseball manager (born 1984)

- Pitcher
- Born: Gabriel O. Suárez; December 14, 1984 (age 41); Denver, Colorado, U.S.
- Bats: Right Throws: Right
- Stats at Baseball Reference

Gabriel O. Suárez (born 14 December 1984) is an American professional baseball manager, former player who played as a pitcher and former owner of the San Rafael Pacifics. Born in the United States, he represented Spain internationally.

== Playing career ==
Suárez was originally drafted by the Montreal Expos in the 33rd round of the 2003 MLB draft out of Arcadia High School in Phoenix, Arizona but did not sign. He was again drafted by the Expos in the 26th round of the 2004 MLB draft after playing with South Mountain Community College.

After playing parts of two seasons with the Expos/Nationals Gulf Coast League team, he was released and finished out the 2005 season with the Lincoln Saltdogs of the Northern League. He signed a minor league contract with the Colorado Rockies in 2006 and then with the Cincinnati Reds in 2007, but did not get past Class-A.

From 2007 to 2010 he played primarily in the Atlantic League of Professional Baseball with several different teams. In 2010, he signed a minor league deal with the Philadelphia Phillies and managed to make it to AA with the Reading Phillies.

In 2011, he played with the Kansas City T-Bones in the American Association and the Atlantic League Road Warriors.

In 2012, he played in the Los Angeles Dodgers farm system with the Great Lakes Loons and Rancho Cucamonga Quakes and was then released. He played in the Mexican League with the Vaqueros Laguna and the Delfines de Ciudad del Carmen and after the season was with the Adelaide Bite in the Australian Baseball League. He signed a minor league contract with the Texas Rangers prior to 2013.

On 2 December 2013 he signed a minor league deal with the San Diego Padres. He was released on 21 March 2014.

== International career ==
Born in the United States, Suárez is of Spanish descent. He played for the Spain national baseball team in the 2013 World Baseball Classic.

== Managing career ==
On 8 March 2017 Suárez was named of the Manager for the Cleburne Railroaders of the American Association of Independent Professional Baseball. Previously he served as the Manager of the defunct Joplin Blasters during the 2016 season.

== Management ==
In December 2018, Suárez purchased the San Rafael Pacifics. He sold the team to the Pecos League in 2020.
