= Papinville Marais des Cygnes River Bridge =

- U.S. National Register of Historic Places
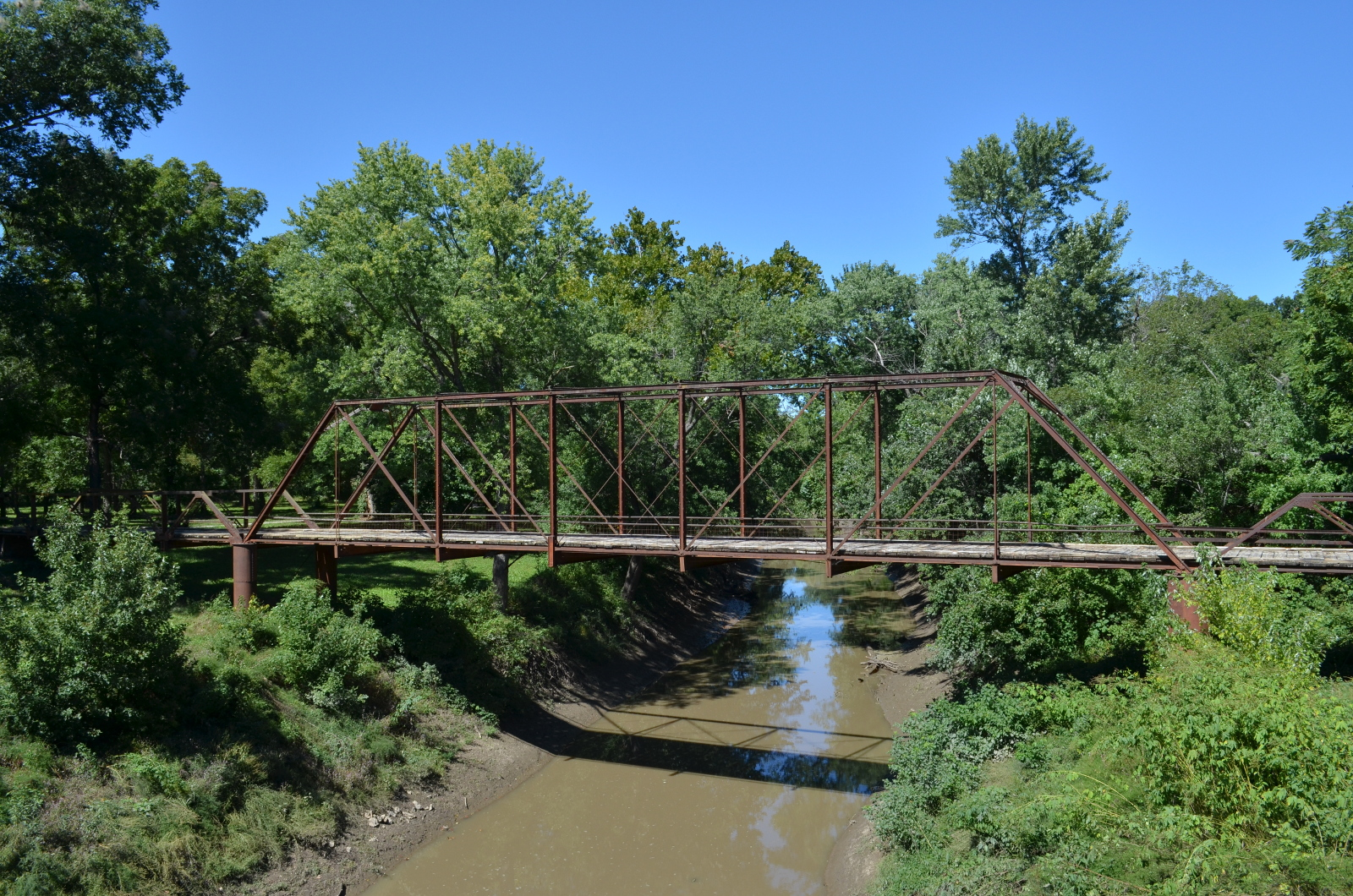
- Papinville Marais des Cygnes River Bridge, September 2014

- Location within Missouri Location within the United States
- Location: Cty. Rd. 648 over the Marais des Cygenes R., Papinville, Missouri
- Coordinates: 38°4′6″N 94°13′54″W
- Area: less than one acre
- Built: 1884
- Built by: Kansas City Bridge and Iron Co.
- Architectural style: Pinned Pratt through truss
- NRHP reference No.: 02001192
- Added to NRHP: October 22, 2002

Papinville Marais des Cygnes River Bridge, is a historic Pinned Pratt through truss located at Papinville, Bates County, Missouri. It was built in 1884 by the Kansas City Bridge and Iron Co. and spans the Marais des Cygnes River. It is a three span bridge with a central Pratt truss measuring 116 feet and two connected Warren-pony truss spans. It rests on stone abutments with concrete and steel piers and it measures a total of 234 feet long.

It was listed as an historic place on the National Register of Historic Places in 2002.
