= Joe Becker Stadium =

Baseball stadium in Joplin, Missouri

- Location within Missouri Location within the United States
- Interactive map of Joe Becker Stadium
- Location: 1301 E. 3rd Street; Joplin, MO 64801
- Coordinates: 37°05′20″N 94°29′56″W
- Owner: City of Joplin
- Capacity: 4,200
- Surface: Infield turf, Outfield grass

Construction
- Opened: 1913

Tenants
- Joplin Outlaws (MINK) (2017–present); Joplin Blasters (AA) (2015–2016); MSSU Lions (college) (1966–2014); Joplin Miners (1917–1954)

Joe Becker Stadium is an American baseball ballpark, built in 1913, located in Joplin, Missouri. The stadium has burned down twice, the first time in 1936 and the second time in 1971. The stadium currently has seating capacity of 4,200 as the home of the Joplin Outlaws of the summer collegiate Mid-America League.

== History ==
The original tenants were the Joplin Miners, a longtime minor league affiliate of the New York Yankees. Whitey Herzog and fellow Hall of Fame inductee Mickey Mantle played for the Miners. Other team monikers have included the Joplin Blasters minor league baseball team and the current Joplin Outlaws collegiate summer baseball team. The Missouri Southern State University baseball team played there through 2014 before relocating to an on-campus stadium in 2015.

In April 1920, Baseball Hall of Fame inductee Ty Cobb and his Detroit Tigers played an exhibition game against the Miners at Joe Becker Stadium.

== Renovations and tenants ==
In January 2014, the El Paso Diablos of the American Association of Independent Professional Baseball relocated to Joplin in exchange for improvements to the stadium's seating, restrooms, lighting, and other infrastructure. They began play in the 2015 season as the Joplin Blasters. A $4.7 million reconstruction of the stadium by Hanson Sports, Corner Greer Architects, and Crossland Construction began in September 2014 which saw the installation of new lighting and fixed seating for 2,400, renovation of restrooms, locker rooms, and team dugouts, plus the addition of concession stands, merchandise sales space, and modern ticket booths.

In 2016, the Blasters closed offices and left Joplin and in 2017, the stadium became home to the Joplin Outlaws of the MINK League, as a collegiate wood-bat team. In 2024, the Outlaws changed leagues, from the MINK League to the Mid-America League.
