= Missouri State League =

- Classification: Class D (1911)
- Sport: Minor League Baseball
- First season: 1911
- Folded: June 4, 1911
- Director: W.G. Lynch (1911); James Lay (1911)
- No. of teams: 5
- Country: United States of America
- Most titles: 1 Brookfield Cubs (1911)
- Related competitions: Missouri-Iowa-Nebraska-Kansas League

The Missouri State League was a short–lived Class D level baseball minor league that played in the 1911 season. The league began play with five teams, all based in Missouri. The Missouri State League folded during the 1911 season.

== History ==
The Missouri State League began the 1911 season as a five–team league with charter franchises based in Brookfield, Missouri, Jefferson City, Missouri, Kirksville, Missouri, Macon, Missouri, and Sedalia, Missouri. The Brookfield Hustlers folded on May 19, 1911 and the Sedalia Cubs moved to Brookfield after the Hustlers folded. On June 2, 1911, the Jefferson City Senators franchise folded. The Missouri State League permanently folded after play on June 4, 1911. The Sedalia/Brookfield Cubs finished in 1st place with a record of 11–8, compiling a 7–3 record based in Sedalia and 4–5 in Brookfield.

The league began play on May 11, 1911, before folding on June 5, 1911.

== 1911 cities represented ==
- Brookfield, MO: Brookfield Hustlers, Brookfield Cubs
- Jefferson City, MO: Jefferson City Senators
- Kirksville, MO: Kirksville Osteopaths
- Macon, MO: Macon Athletics
- Sedalia, MO: Sedalia Cubs

== 1911 Standings and statistics ==
Missouri State League standings
schedule

Team standings	W	L	PCT	GB	Managers
Sedalia Cubs / Brookfield Cubs	11	8	.579	--	R.T. Easley
Macon Athletics	10	8	.566	0.5	Brooks Gordon
Jefferson City Senators	11	9	.550	0.5	Chief Myers
Kirksville Osteopaths	9	12	.429	3.0	Senter Rainey
Brookfield Hustlers	0	4	.000	NA	Ginger Lyons

Brookfield Hustlers disbanded May 19.
Sedalia (7–3) moved to Brookfield May 24.
Jefferson City disbanded June 2
League folded June 5.

1911 player statistics
Player	Team	Stat	Tot	Player	Team	Stat	Tot
John Herman	Macon	BA	.407	Gunder; William Akers; Monegan	Jefferson City; Macon; Kirksville	W W W	2; 2; 2
Bert St. John	Macon	Runs	9	Monegan	Kirksville	SO	44
Kline	Jefferson City	Hits	13	Four tied		PCT	1.000 1–0
David Kraft	Kirksville	HR	3				
