= Joplin Blasters =

- 2015–2016; Joplin, Missouri
Team logo
Cap insignia

Minor league affiliations
- Class: Independent
- League: American Association
- Division: South

Minor league titles
- League titles: none

Team data
- Name: Joplin Blasters
- Colors: Black, gold, yellow, white
- Ballpark: Joe Becker Stadium
- Owner/ Operator: WLD Suarez Baseball LLC
- General manager: Shawn Suarez
- Manager: Gabe Suarez
- Website: joplinblasters.com

The Joplin Blasters were an American professional baseball team based in Joplin, Missouri. The Blasters were members of the South Division of the American Association of Independent Professional Baseball. The team's home games were played at a reconstructed Joe Becker Stadium. The team was managed by former Chicago Cubs player and minor league managing veteran Carlos Lezcano. A home game on May 21, 2015, against the Wichita Wingnuts inaugurated the franchise and its 100-game regular season. The Blasters organization failed to pay the stadium lease during its final season. During the 2016 fall league meetings, it was confirmed by league commissioner Miles Wolff that the Blasters would not be returning for 2017.

== Season-by-season records ==
Joplin Blasters (2015–2016)
Season	Total	Finished	Playoffs
2015	55–45 (3)	.550	Did not qualify
2016	36–64 (3)	.360	Did not qualify
