= Webb City, Missouri minor league baseball history =

Webb City, Missouri minor league baseball teams
- 1887–1912; (1887, 1891, 1903, 1905–1909, 1912); Webb City, Missouri

Minor league affiliations
- Class: Independent (1887, 1891); Class D (1903); Class C (1905, 1906–1909); Class D (1912)
- League: Southwestern League (1887); Southwestern Missouri League (1891); Missouri Valley League (1903, 1905); Western Association (1906–1909); Missouri-Kansas League (1912)

Major league affiliations
- Team: None

Minor league titles
- League titles (0): None

Team data
- Name: Webb City Stars (1887); Webb City (1891); Webb City Goldbugs (1903, 1905–1907); Webb City Webbfeet (1908–1909); Webb City (1912)
- Ballpark: Sunset Park (1887, 1891, 1903, 1905–1909, 1912)

Minor league baseball teams were based in Webb City, Missouri in various seasons between 1887 and 1912. Under numerous nicknames, Webb City teams played as members of the 1887 Southwestern League, 1891 Southwestern Missouri League, the Missouri Valley League in 1903 and 1905, Western Association from 1906 to 1909 and 1912 Missouri-Kansas League. Webb City hosted home minor league games at Sunset Park for the duration of their minor league play.

== History ==
Minor league baseball began in Webb City, Missouri in 1887. The Webb City Stars played as charter members of the 1887 Southwestern League. In their first season of play, Webb City placed 5th in the six–team league. The Stars finished with a record of 10–11, playing under manager James Ellis. The Southwestern League folded after the 1887 season.

Webb City returned to minor league baseball in 1891, when the Webb City team played as member of the Southwestern Missouri League. Webb City ended the 1891 season with a 10–14 record, finishing in fourth place in the seven–team league.

In 1903, Webb City briefly gained a franchise during the season. On July 16, 1903, the Nevada Lunatics of Nevada, Missouri, members of the Independent level Missouri Valley League relocated to Webb City. The team became the Webb City Goldbugs. On July 19, 1903, the Webb City Goldbugs disbanded after playing four games based in Webb City. The Nevada/Webb City team had an overall record of 21–43 under manager A. B. Cockerell when the team folded.

In 1905, Webb City returned to minor league play, rejoining the Class C level Missouri Valley League. The 1905 Webb City Goldbugs ended the season with a record of 47–54, placing fifth in the Missouri Valley League, playing under manager Elmer Meredith. The team played home games at Sunset Park in Webb City. The Missouri Valley League folded after the 1905 season, as the league was renamed to become the Western Association.

Webb City continued play in the 1906 Class C level Western Association. The 1906 Webb City Goldbugs finished with a 57–79 record, placing seventh in the Western Association while playing under manager Dick Rohn.

The 1907 Webb City Goldbugs finished with a record of 65–70, continuing play in the Western Association. The team placed sixth in the Western Association final standings. The 1907 managers were Dick Rohn and George Dalrymple.

Webb City became the Webb City Webbfeet in 1908, continuing play in the Western Association. The 1908 Webb City Webbfeet finished with a record of 66–69 and placed sixth in the Western Association final standings. The manager was Larry Milton.

On August 21, 1908, Fred Burnham of the Webfeet pitched a no–hitter against the Hutchinson Salt Pickers in a 5–0 Webb City victory.

The Webb City Webbfeet continued play in 1909 and relocated during the season. On July 18, 1909, the Webb City franchise moved to Sapulpa, Oklahoma and became the Sapulpa Oilers . The Webb City/Sapulpa team finished the season with an overall record of 64–59. The team placed fifth in the Western Association, playing under managers Perry Reinker and Frank Everhart.

In 1912, minor league baseball returned as the Webb City team played as a charter member of the independent level Missouri-Kansas League. The Webb City team finished with a record of 7–6 and placed third in the four–team league.

In 1914, Webb City partnered with neighboring Joplin, Missouri for a team, which played home games in Joplin. The Joplin-Webb City Miners played as a member of the 1914 Western Association. On July 10, 1914, the Joplin–Webb City Miners' record was 22–46 when the franchise moved to Guthrie, Oklahoma.

Webb City, Missouri has not hosted another minor league team.

== The ballpark ==
Webb City minor league teams hosted home games at Sunset Park for their duration of minor league play. The ballpark was located on West Broadway in Webb, City, Missouri.

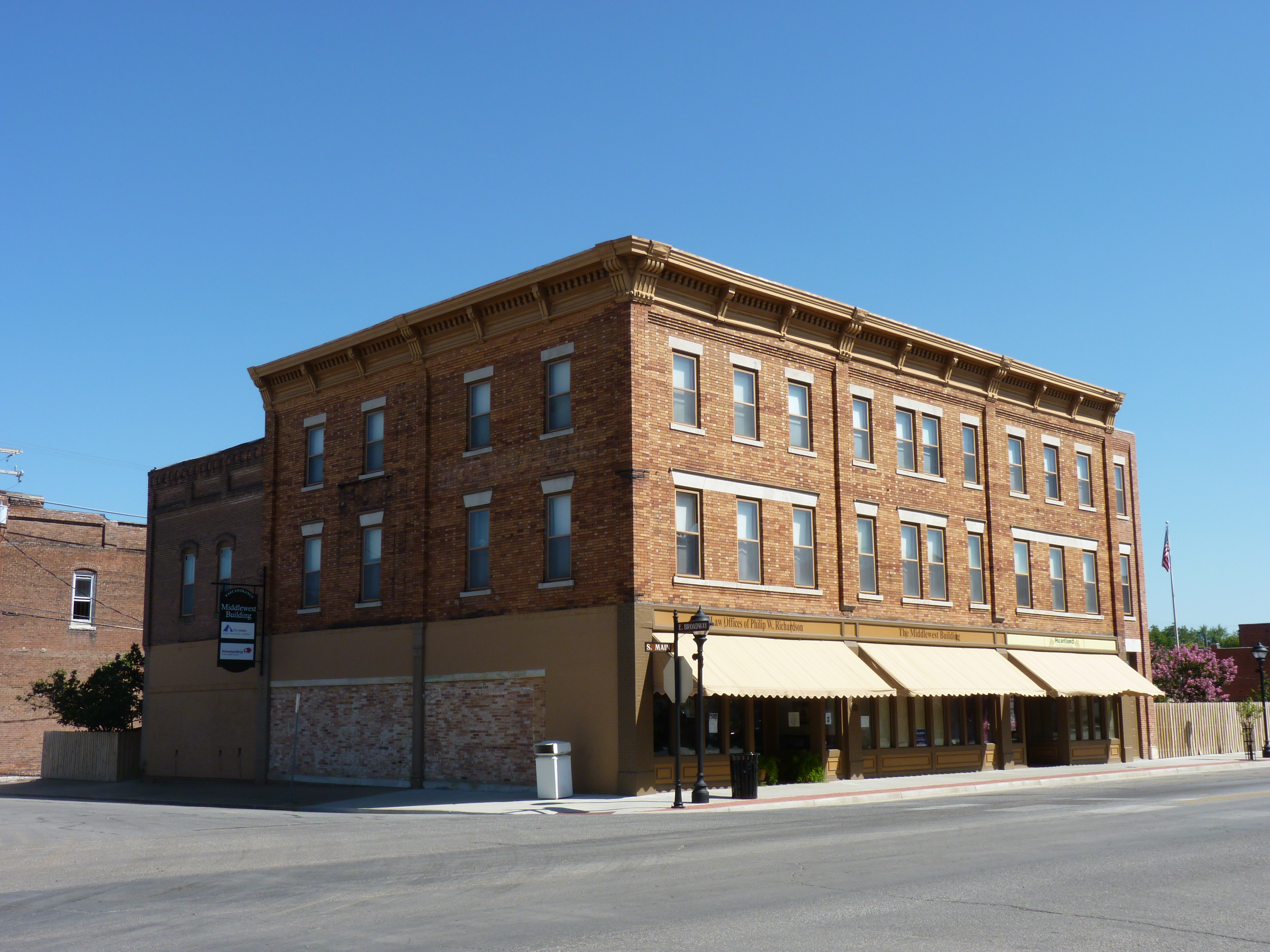
(2010) Downtown. Middle West Hotel. National Register of Historic Places. Webb City, Missouri

== Timeline ==
Year(s)	# Yrs.	Team	Level	League	Ballpark
1887	1	Web City Stars	Independent	Southwestern League	Sunset Park
1891	1	Web City	Independent	Southwestern Missouri League	Sunset Park
1903	1	Webb City Goldbugs	Class D	Missouri Valley League	Sunset Park
1905	1	Webb City Goldbugs	Class C	Missouri Valley League	Sunset Park
1906–1907	2	Webb City Goldbugs	Class C	Western Association	Sunset Park
1908–1909	2	Webb City Webbfeet	Class C	Western Association	Sunset Park
1912	1	Webb City	Class D	Missouri-Kansas League	Sunset Park
1914	1	Joplin-Webb City Miners	Class D	Western Association	Sunset Park

== Year-by-year record ==
Year	Record	Finish	Manager	Playoffs
1887	10–11	NA	James Ellis	Disbanded July 15
1892	10–14	4th	NA	No playoffs held
1903	21–43	NA	A.B. Cockerell	Nevada (21–39) moved to Webb City July 13; Team folded July 16
1905	47–54	5th	Elmer Meredith	No playoffs held
1906	57–79	7th	Tom Hayden / Richard Rohn	No playoffs held
1907	65–70	6th	Richard Rohn / George Dalrymple	No playoffs held
1908	66–69	6th	Larry Milton	No playoffs held
1909	64–59	5th	Perry Parker / Frank Everhart	Webb City moved to Sapulpa July 18
1912	7–6	3rd	NA	No playoffs held
1914	35–92	6th	Claude Marcum	Joplin-Webb City (22–46) moved to Guthrie July 10

== Notable alumni ==
- Chick Autry (1906)
- Harry Cheek (1906–1908)
- Orth Collins (1907)
- Dick Crutcher (1909)
- Red Downey (1908)
- Fred Ketchum (1905)
- Bill Lattimore (1906)
- Con Lucid (1891)
- Tex Jones (1907)
- Larry Milton (1907, 1908)
- Ivy Olson (1906–1907)
- Harrison Peppers (1887, 1891)
- Bill Rapps (1903)
- John Roach (1908)
- Ray Rolling (1906)

=== See also ===
Category:Webb City (minor league baseball) players
Webb City Goldbugs players
Webb City Stars players
Webb City Webfeet players
