= Missouri Valley League =

American minor league baseball league (1901–1905)

- Classification: Independent (1901); Class D (1902–1903); Class C (1904–1905)
- Sport: Minor League Baseball
- First season: 1901
- Folded: 1905
- Replaced by: South Central League
- President: Dr. D.M. Shiveley (1902–1904); Richard Robertson, Jr. (1905)
- No. of teams: 23
- Country: United States of America
- Most titles: 1 Nevada Lunatics (1902); Sedalia Gold Bugs (1903); Iola Gasbags (1904); Pittsburg Miners (1905)
- Related competitions: Western Association

The Missouri Valley League was an American minor league baseball league which operated from 1901 through 1905.

== History ==
The Missouri Valley league formed in 1901 as an Independent league. The league consisted of teams in Kansas and Missouri: Columbus, Kansas, Fort Scott Memphis Route, Galena, Kansas, Joplin Colts, Monett Railroadmen, Nevada Reds, Oswego, Kansas and Pittsburg Coal Barons. 1901 league records and standings are unknown.

In 1902, The teams in Nevada, Missouri, Fort Scott, Kansas and Joplin, Missouri remained. Sedalia, Missouri; Coffeyville, Kansas; Jefferson City, Missouri; Iola, Kansas and Springfield, Missouri joined as the Missouri Valley League became designated as a Class D level league. On June 23, the Coffeyville Indians, with a 9–30 record, relocated to Chanute, Kansas, where they compiled a 32–51 record.

In the 1903 season, the teams in Chanute and Jefferson City folded. New teams in Leavenworth, Kansas, and Pittsburg, Kansas, formed and joined the league. The Nevada team, with a record of 21–39, relocated to Webb City, Missouri, on July 13, where their record was 0–4. The teams from Leavenworth and Webb City folded mid–season on July 16.

In 1904, new teams in Leavenworth, Kansas, and Topeka, Kansas, formed and joined the league. After the 1904 season, the Missouri Valley League essentially reformed under a different name as five member teams formed under a new league. Joplin, Leavenworth, Sedalia, Springfield, and Topeka all joined the new 1905 Western Association. The Iola franchise folded. The Fort Scott and Pittsburg franchises remained in the 1905 Class C level Missouri Valley League. In 1905, South McAlester moved to Ft. Smith on July 6. Muskogee disbanded on August 31, causing the Missouri Valley League to end on September 5.

== Cities represented ==
- Chanute, KS: Chanute Oilers (1902)
- Columbus, KS: Columbus (1901)
- Coffeyville, KS: Coffeyville Indians (1902)
- Fort Scott, KS: Fort Scott Memphis Route (1901); Fort Scott Giants (1902–1905)
- Fort Smith, AR: Fort Smith Giants (1905)
- Galena, KS: Galena (1901)
- Iola, KS: Iola Gasbags (1902); Iola Gaslighters (1903); Iola Gasbags (1904)
- Jefferson City, MO: Jefferson City Convicts (1902)
- Joplin, MO: Joplin Colts (1901); Joplin Miners (1902–1904)
- Leavenworth, KS: Leavenworth White Sox (1903); Leavenworth Orioles (1904)
- McAlester, OK: South McAlester Giants (1905)
- Monett, MO: Monett Railroadmen (1901)
- Muskogee, OK: Muskogee Reds (1905)
- Nevada, MO: Nevada Reds (1901); Nevada Lunatics (1902–1903)
- Oswego, KS: Oswego (1901)
- Parsons, KS: Parsons Preachers (1905)
- Pittsburg, KS: Pittsburg Coal Barons (1901); Pittsburg Coal Diggers (1903–1904); Pittsburg Miners (1905)
- Sedalia, MO: Sedalia Gold Bugs (1902–1904)
- Springfield, MO: Springfield Reds (1902); Springfield Midgets (1903–1904)
- Topeka, KS: Topeka Saints (1904)
- Tulsa, OK: Tulsa Oilers (1905)
- Vinita, OK: Vinita Cherokees (1905)
- Webb City, MO: Webb City Goldbugs (1903, 1905)

== Standings & statistics ==
=== 1902 Missouri Valley League ===
schedule

Team standings	W	L	PCT	GB	Managers
Nevada Lunatics	86	38	.694	--	James Driscoll
Springfield Reds	83	40	.678	2½	Frank Hurlburt
Fort Scott Giants	80	44	.645	6	Fred Hornaday
Sedalia Gold Bugs	72	48	.600	12	Joseph Roe / Fultz
Joplin Miners	56	66	.459	29	Claude Marcum / Wickhizer
Coffeyville Indians / Chanute Oilers	41	81	.336	44	Fred Porter / Larry Powers / Galbreath / Jack Jamieson
Jefferson City Convicts	40	85	.320	46½	A.B. Carey / E.J. Miller
Iola Gasbags	34	90	.274	52	Dan Jenkins

Coffeyville (9–30) moved to Chanute June 23.

=== 1903 Missouri Valley League ===
schedule

Team standings	W	L	PCT	GB	Managers
Sedalia Gold Bugs	86	47	.647	--	W.J. Ferguson / R.N. Harrison
Springfield Midgets	82	48	.631	2½	Frank Hurlburt
Iola Gaslighters	79	52	.603	6	A.H.Harris
Joplin Miners	69	62	.527	16	Dave Joseph
Fort Scott Giants	71	64	.526	16	Fred Hornaday
Pittsburg Coal Diggers	39	95	.291	47½	Claude East
Nevada Lunatics / Webb City Goldbugs	21	43	.328	NA	A.B. Cockerell
Leavenworth White Sox	15	50	.231	NA	Clyde Hughes

Nevada (21–39) moved to Webb City July 13, then disbanded July 16; Leavenworth disbanded July 16.

=== 1904 Missouri Valley League ===
schedule

Team standings	W	L	PCT	GB	Managers
Iola Gasbags	83	41	.669	--	Dad Risley
Springfield Midgets	77	46	.626	5½	F. Smith / John Perrine / Frank Hulburt
Joplin Miners	77	49	.611	7	John Fillman
Sedalia Gold Bugs	71	53	.573	12	E.E. Codding
Pittsburg Coal Diggers	57	64	.471	24½	O.H. Baldwin / John Kane
Leavenworth Orioles	48	74	.393	34	Eli Cates / Elmer Smith
Topeka Saints	45	78	.366	37½	Gus Alberts / C. Cole / John Shrant / Spencer Abbott
Fort Scott Giants	36	89	.288	47½	Jack Bene / Louis Armstrong

Player statistics
Player	Team	Stat	Tot	Player	Team	Stat	Tot
Jacob Bauer	Sedalia	BA	.346	Amos Morgan	Iola	W	32
Jacob Bauer	Sedalia	Hits	178	Ed Craig	Springfield	Pct	.826; 19–4
				John Root	Iola	SO	224

=== 1905 Missouri Valley League ===
schedule

Team standings	W	L	PCT	GB	Managers
Pittsburg Miners	75	26	.743	--	H.O. Baldwin
Parsons Preachers	61	40	.604	14	John Hamilton
Muskogee Reds	52	46	.531	21½	G.A. Sabin / Mel Cooley / Dillard / Alex Sandheimer
Ft. Scott Giants	49	52	.485	26	Harry Chapman
Webb City Gold Bugs	47	54	.465	28	Elmer Meredith
Tulsa Oilers	44	58	.431	31½	Charlie Schafft
Vinita Cherokees	41	63	.394	35½	Ed Finney
South McAlester Giants / Ft. Smith Giants	33	63	.344	39½	Joe B. Roe

South McAlester moved to Ft. Smith July 6.; Muskogee disbanded Aug 31; season to be shortened to September 5.

Player statistics
Player	Team	Stat	Tot	Player	Team	Stat	Tot
Cy Stinson	Pittsburg	W	22	Cy Stinson	Pittsburg	CG	30
Cy Stinson	Pittsburg	IP	279	William Burns	Pittsburg	Pct	.875; 21–3
