= Dutch Henry =

American baseball player (1902–1968)

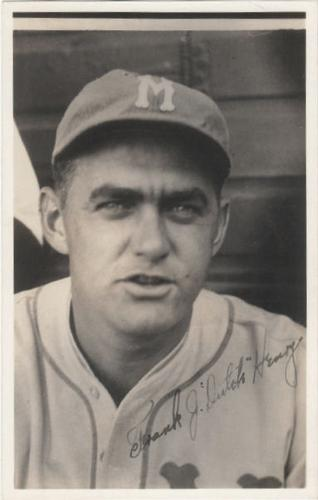
- Pitcher
- Born: May 12, 1902; Cleveland, Ohio, U.S.
- Died: August 23, 1968 (aged 66); Cleveland, Ohio, U.S.
- Batted: Left Threw: Left

MLB debut
- September 16, 1921, for the St. Louis Browns

Last MLB appearance
- September 18, 1930, for the Chicago White Sox

MLB statistics
- Win–loss record: 27–43
- Earned run average: 4.39
- Strikeouts: 170
- Stats at Baseball Reference

Teams
- St. Louis Browns (1921–1922); Brooklyn Robins (1923–1924); New York Giants (1927–1929); Chicago White Sox (1929–1930)

Frank John "Dutch" Henry (May 12, 1902 – August 23, 1968) was an American Major League Baseball pitcher with the St. Louis Browns, Brooklyn Robins, New York Giants and Chicago White Sox between 1921 and 1930. Henry batted and threw left handed. He was born in Cleveland.
