= Nick Kahl (baseball) =

American baseball player (1879-1959)

- Second baseman
- Born: April 10, 1879; Coulterville, Illinois, U.S.
- Died: July 13, 1959 (aged 80); Sparta, Illinois, U.S.
- Batted: Right Threw: Right

MLB debut
- May 2, 1905, for the Cleveland Naps

Last MLB appearance
- August 2, 1905, for the Cleveland Naps

MLB statistics
- Batting average: .215
- Home runs: 0
- Runs batted in: 21
- Stats at Baseball Reference

Teams
- Cleveland Naps (1905)

Nicholas Alexander Kahl (April 10, 1879 – July 13, 1959) was an American Major League Baseball second baseman. He played in 40 games for the Cleveland Naps in 1905. His minor league baseball career spanned fourteen seasons, from 1902 until 1915.

== Sources ==
- Career statistics from Baseball Reference · Baseball Reference (Minors) · Retrosheet · Baseball Almanac
