= Eli Cates =

American baseball player (1877–1964)

- Pitcher
- Born: January 26, 1877; Greens Fork, Indiana, U.S.
- Died: May 29, 1964 (aged 87); Anderson, Indiana, U.S.
- Batted: Right Threw: Right

MLB debut
- April 20, 1908, for the Washington Senators

Last MLB appearance
- September 29, 1908, for the Washington Senators

MLB statistics
- Win–loss record: 4–8
- ERA: 2.53
- Strikeouts: 33
- Stats at Baseball Reference

Teams
- Washington Senators (1908)

Eli Eldo Cates (January 26, 1877 – May 29, 1964) was an American Major League Baseball pitcher. Cates played for the Washington Senators in 1908.

On August 10, 1902, Cates pitched a notable minor league baseball no-hitter. On that date, the Nevada Lunatics and Jefferson City Convicts of the Class D Missouri Valley League played a game that resulted in a double no-hitter. Both Jefferson City's Jim Courtwright and Nevada's Eli Cates pitched no–hit games. Nevada won the game 1–0. A double no-hitter has happened just 10 times in baseball history, all at the minor league level.
