= Raleigh Aitchison =

American baseball player (1887-1958)

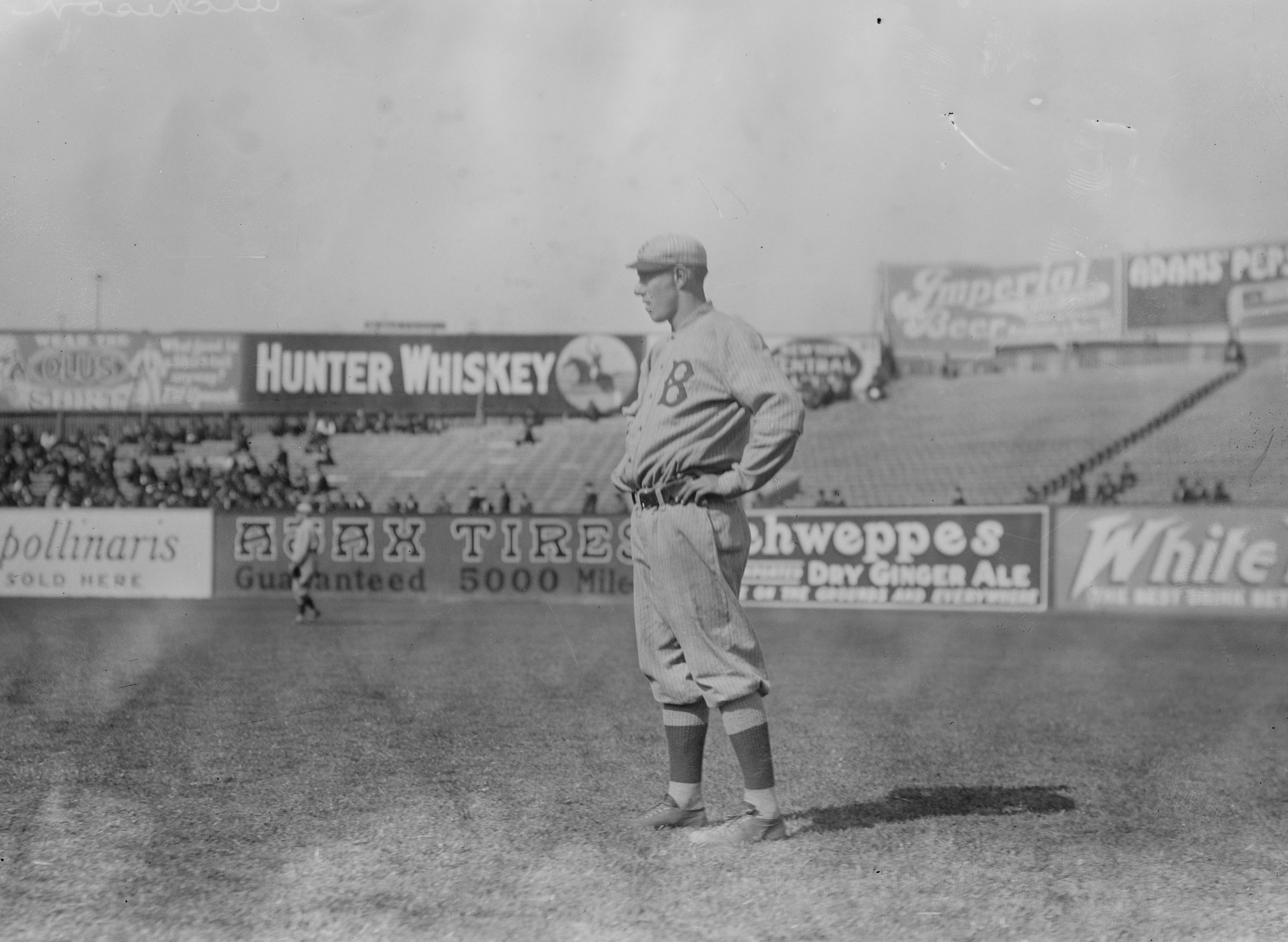
- Pitcher
- Born: December 5, 1887; Tyndall, South Dakota
- Died: September 26, 1958 (aged 70); Columbus, Kansas, U.S.
- Batted: Right Threw: Left

MLB debut
- April 19, 1911, for the Brooklyn Dodgers

Last MLB appearance
- June 20, 1915, for the "Brooklyn Robins".

MLB statistics
- Win–loss record: 12–12
- Earned run average: 3.01
- Strikeouts: 101
- Stats at Baseball Reference

Teams
- Brooklyn Dodgers/Robins (1911, 1914–1915)

Raleigh Leonidas Aitchison (December 5, 1887 – September 26, 1958), nicknamed "Redskin" was an American pitcher in Major League Baseball from 1911 to 1915. He continued to pitch in the minor leagues through 1923 with an assortment of teams.

After his retirement from baseball he worked for 18 years for the Columbus, Kansas police department and was a deputy sheriff for Cherokee County, Kansas.
