= Joplin Miners =

- Founded in 1902; Joplin, Missouri

Minor league affiliations
- Previous classes: Class A (1917–1921, 1933); Class C (1904–1910, 1922–1924, 1926-1932, 1934–1942, 1946–1954); Class D (1902–1903, 1911, 1914)
- Previous leagues: Missouri Valley League (1901–1904); Western Association (1905–1911, 1914); Western League (1917–1921, 1933); Western Association (1922–1932, 1934–1954)

Major league affiliations
- Previous teams: St Louis Browns (1933); Boston Red Sox (1934); New York Yankees (1935–1942, 1946–1953); St. Louis Cardinals (1954)

Minor league titles
- League titles: 2 1910, 1949

Team data
- Previous names: Joplin Colts (1901); Joplin Miners (1902–1903, 1911, 1914, 1917–1925); Joplin Ozarks (1926); Joplin Miners (1927-1932, 1934–1942, 1946–1953); Joplin Cardinals (1954)
- Ballpark: Joe Becker Stadium (1917–present)
- Previous parks: Cox Park (1902–1906); Miners Park (1907–1916)

The Joplin Miners was the primary name of the minor league baseball team in Joplin, Missouri that played for 49 seasons between 1901 and 1954. Baseball Hall of Fame Inductees Mickey Mantle and Whitey Herzog played for Joplin. Professional baseball returned to Joplin and Joe Becker Stadium when the Joplin Blasters began play in 2015.

== Franchise history ==
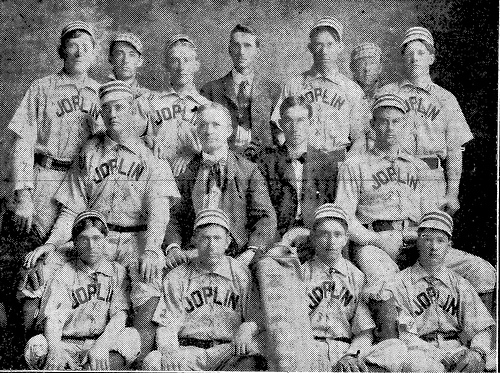
1902 Joplin Miners baseball team

After early Joplin teams played in 1887, 1891 and 1901, the Miners began play in 1902 and were a consistent franchise for the next 50 years. The Miners played in the Western Association (1934–1954, 1922–1932, 1905–1911, 1914), the Western League (1917–21, 1933) and the Missouri Valley League (1902-04).

The Miners were long time affiliates of the New York Yankees (1946–1953; 1935–1942). They were also affiliates of the St. Louis Browns (1933), Boston Red Sox (1934) and the St. Louis Cardinals (1954).

The 1910 Miners finished 90–34 in the Western Association, 22.5 games ahead on second place Enid. The 1910 Miners were recognized as the sixty-sixth greatest minor league team of all time.

In April 1920, Ty Cobb and the Detroit Tigers played an exhibition game against the Miners in Joplin.

The team had some split seasons with other locales. The 1909 Miners also played in El Reno, Oklahoma as the El Reno Packers. The 1914 team played some games in Webb City, Missouri, Guthrie, Oklahoma as the Senators and Henryetta, Oklahoma as the Boosters. The 1932 team played in Hutchinson, Kansas, Independence, Missouri and Topeka, Kansas.

The 1952 Miners finished 87-52. The 1950 squad finished 90-46, with an 18-year-old Mickey Mantle hitting .383 with 199 hits, 30 doubles, 12 triples and 26 homers for the Miners.

On January 24, 2014, it was announced that an independent professional team relocated to Joplin to play in a renovated Joe Becker Stadium. Subsequently, the Joplin Blasters of the Independent American Association began play in 2015. The Blasters played two seasons before disbanding in 2016.

== Ballparks ==
The team played at Cox Park in 1902–1906. it was located at 16th & Main. From 1907 to 1916 the franchise played at Miners Park, located between 2nd and 4th streets off Main Street. The team had multiple home ballparks, including Joe Becker Stadium, and Miners Stadium. In 1917, the team began play in a new Miners Park, now Joe Becker Stadium, located at 1301 East Third Street.

== Notable Joplin alumni ==
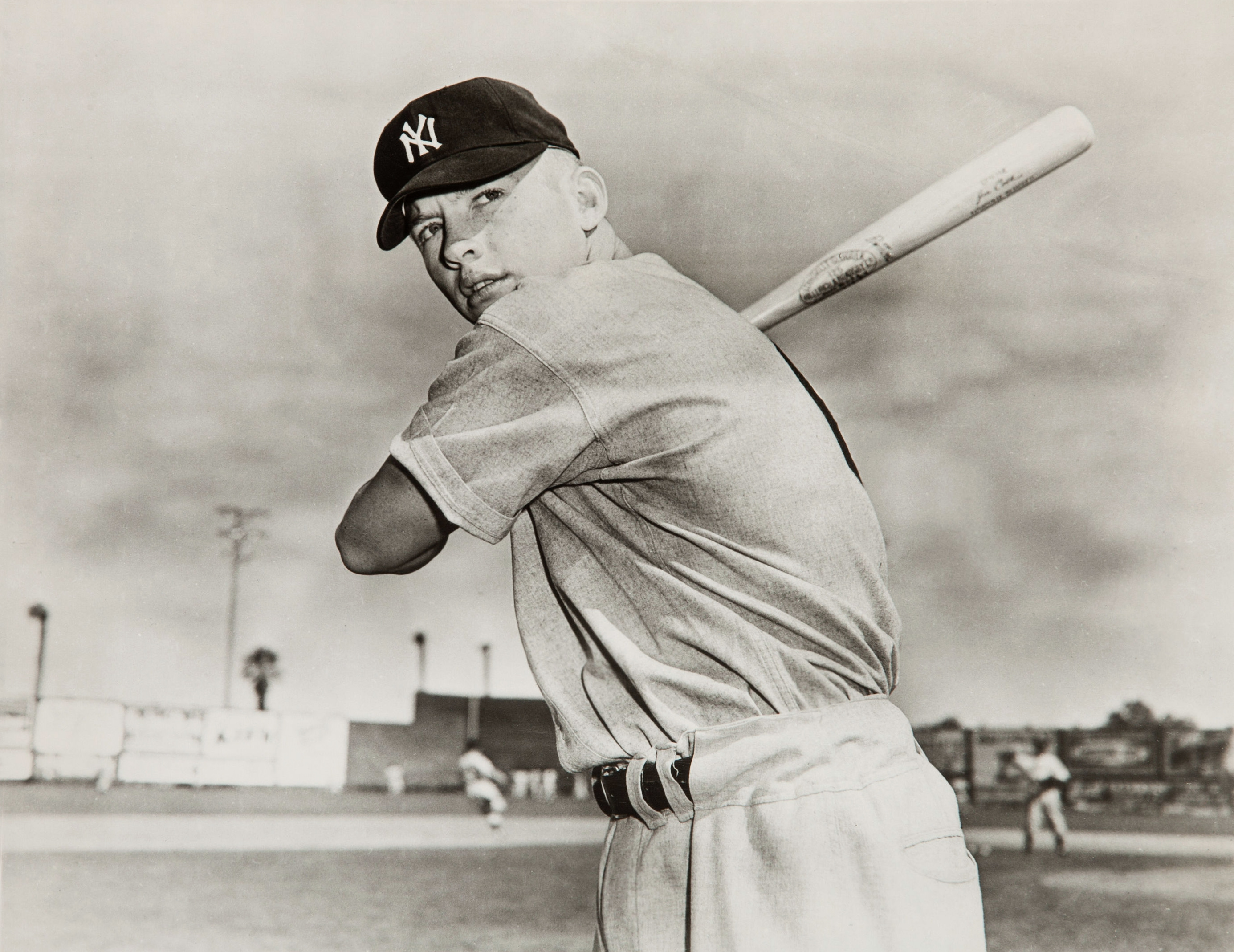
Mickey Mantle, 1951

Baseball Hall of Fame Alumni

- Whitey Herzog (1951) Inducted, 2010
- Mickey Mantle (1950) Inducted, 1972

Notable MLB alumni

- Gene Green (1954)
- Jim Coates (1953) MLB All-Star
- Johnny Blanchard (1952)
- Jerry Lumpe (1952) MLB All-Star
- Norm Siebern (1952) 3 x MLB All-Star
- John Gabler (1951)
- Mel Wright (1951)
- Harry Craft (1950, MGR)
- Lou Skizas (1950)
- Bob Wiesler (1950)
- Cal Neeman (1949–1950)
- Al Pilarcik (1949)
- Jim Finigan (1948–49) 2 x MLB All-Star
- Jerry Snyder (1947)
- Eddie Bockman (1940–41)
- Ralph Houk (1940) Manager: 1961 & 1962 World Series Champion – New York Yankees
- Al Lyons (1940)
- Ferrell Anderson (1939)
- Russ Derry (1938)
- Al Gerheauser (1938)
- Benny Bengough (1936–37, MGR)
- Johnny Lindell (1936) MLB All-Star
- Wally Schang (1934)
- Cy Blanton (1932) 2 x MLB All-Star; 1935 NL ERA Leader
- Tommy Thevenow (1923)
- Pea Ridge Day (1923)
- Gabby Street (1922, MGR) Manager: 1931 World Series Champion – St. Louis Cardinals
- Gene Robertson (1920)
- Paul Strand (1919)
- Dick Crutcher (1918–19)
- Rudy Hulswitt (1918–19)
- George Boehler (1918–20)
- Bill Burwell (1917–19)
- Josh Devore (1917)
- Pat Collins (1917–19)
- Earl Hamilton (1910)
- Joe Kelly (1910)
- Marc Hall (1910)
- Mike Balenti (1909)
- Cy Slapnicka (1908) MLB: Player, GM and Scout; Signed Baseball Hall of Fame pitchers Bob Lemon and Bob Feller
