= Beloit (Kansas baseball) =

Beliot (Kansas baseball)
- 1909–1910; Beloit, Kansas

Minor league affiliations
- Class: Class D (1909–1910)
- League: Central Kansas League (1909–1910)

Minor league titles
- League titles (0): None

Team data
- Name: Beloit (1909-1910)
- Ballpark: Association Park (1909–1910)

The Beloit team was a minor league baseball team based in Beloit, Kansas. Beloit was without a formal nickname, common in the era, as the franchise played the 1909 and 1910 seasons as members of the Class D level Central Kansas League. Beloit hosted minor league home games at the Association Park.

Beloit was home to the semi-professional "Beloit Leaguers" team from 1919 to 1922. In 1920, the Leaguers notably hosted five games against the visiting Kansas City Monarchs of the Negro National League.

== History ==
The 1909 Beloit team was the first hosted minor league baseball team in Beloit, Kansas, beginning play as members of the 1909 Class D level Central Kansas League. The league expanded from six teams to eight teams in 1909, adding the Abilene and Beloit teams. The Abilene Red Sox, Clay Center Cubs, Ellsworth Blues, Junction City Soldiers, Manhattan Maroons, Minneapolis Minnies and Salina Trade Winners teams joined Beloit in beginning league play on June 14, 1909.

In their first season of play, Beloit placed sixth in the eight-team Central Kansas League. Beloit ended the 1909 season with a record of 33–36, as Hi Ebright served as manager. Beloit finished 12.0 games behind the first place Ellsworth Blues in the final league standings, as no playoffs were held. The final standings were led by Ellsworth (44–23), followed by the Salina Trade Winners (40–28), Abilene Red Sox (37–30), Minneapolis Minnies (36–32), Junction City Soldiers (34–32), Beloit (33–36), Clay Center Colts (32–37) and Manhattan Maroons (16–54).

In their final season of minor league play, Beloit relocated during the 1910 season. Continuing play in the 1910 Central Kansas League, Beloit had a record of 11–40 on July 21, 1910, when the team relocated to Chapman, Kansas. After compiling a 7–22 record in Chapman, the team finished the season in last place. Beloit/Chapman ended the regular season with an overall record 18–62, to place eighth, playing the season under manager Ben Dimond in both locations. The dual city team finished 34.5 games behind the first place Ellsworth Blues in the eight-team league final standings. Chapman permanently folded following the 1910 season, as the Central Kansas League was reduced to four teams in 1911.

Beloit, Kansas has not hosted another minor league team.

=== Beloit Leaguers 1919 to 1922 ===
From 1919 to 1922, Beloit hosted a baseball team called the "Beloit Leaguers," an independent semi-professional team, who were not part of any organized league. The team was founded in 1919 by local businessman Ike Sowell, who formed a local Baseball Association that built a new ballpark for the team, named Sowell Park.

On April 22 and 23, 1920, the Leaguers hosted the Negro National League team Kansas City Monarchs for two games. In the first game, Kansas City defeated Beloit 3–2 in 10-innings on a home run by Hurley McNair. In the second game, Beloit defeated Kansas City 5–4. On May 4–5 and 6, the teams met again for three games in Beloit, playing at "Osborne" and "Sowell Park". Beloit swept all three games, by scores of 6–3, 3-1 and 2–0. Beloit defeated Monarchs pitcher John Donalsdon in the second game.

The 1920 team claimed the "independent state championship of Kansas." Besides the Kansas City Monarchs, the Leaguers also played numerous games against the Kansas City Blues and Omaha Rourkes minor league teams.

== The ballpark ==
The 1909 and 1910 Beloit teams hosted minor league home games at the Association Park. The ballpark had general admission of 0.25 and 0.35 for the grandstand. Admission was 0.50 on July 4.

== Timeline ==
Year(s)	# Yrs.	Team	Level	League	Ballpark
1910-1911	2	Beloit	Class D	Central Kansas League	Association Park

== Year–by–year records ==
Year	Record	Finish	Manager	Playoffs/Notes
1909	33–36	6th	Hi Ebright	No playoffs held
1910	18–62	8th	Ben Dimond	Team (11-40) moved to Chapman July 21

== Notable alumni ==
- Hi Ebright (1909, MGR)
