= Ellsworth, Kansas minor league baseball history =

Ellsworth, Kansas minor league baseball teams
- 1905–1910; (1905, 1908–1910); Ellsworth, Kansas

Minor league affiliations
- Class: Class D (1905, 1908–1910)
- League: Kansas State League (1905); Central Kansas League (1908–1910)

Major league affiliations
- Team: None

Minor league titles
- League titles (3): 1905; 1909; 1910

Team data
- Name: Ellsworth (1905); Ellsworth Worthies (1908–1909); Ellsworth Blues (1910)
- Ballpark: Unknown (1905, 1908–1910)

Minor league baseball teams were based in Ellsworth, Kansas in four seasons between 1905 and 1910. Ellsworth teams played as members of the Class D level 1905 Kansas State League and the Central Kansas League from 1908 to 1910. Ellsworth won league championships in 1905, 1909 and 1910.

== History ==
Ellsworth, Kansas first hosted minor league baseball in 1905. Beginning league play on June 15, 1905, the Ellsworth team won the 1905 Kansas State League championship. Playing as charter members of the Class Class D level league, Ellsworth finished with a 34–15 record under manager Arthur Relihan. In the six–team league, Ellsworth finished 4.5 games ahead on the second place Great Bend Millers (19–9) in the final Kansas State League standings. Following in the standings were the Minneapolis Minnies, (24–22), Hutchinson Salt Miners (22–24), Lincoln Center (11–19) and Kingman/Hoisington (13–34). The Ellsworth franchise folded following the 1905 season and did not return to the 1906 Kansas State League.

In 1908, Ellsworth again hosted minor league baseball when the Ellsworth "Worthies" began play. The Worthies began play as charter members of the six–team Class D level Central Kansas League. The Little River team, McPherson Merry Macks, Minneapolis Minnies, Newton Browns and Salina Trade Winners joined Ellsworth as charter members.

Beginning play on June 22, 1908, the Ellsworth Worthies placed second in the 1908 Central Kansas League. Under manager F.S. Foster, the Worthies finished with a final record of 25–22, ending the season in a second-place tie with the Newton Browns. In the final Central Kansas League standings, Ellsworth finished 4.5 games behind the first place Minneapolis Minnies.

The 1909 Ellsworth Worthies won the Central Kansas League championship as the league expanded to eight teams. Ellsworth ended the 1909 season with a record of 44–33, placing 1st in the final league standings. With George Seigle as manager, Ellsworth finished 4.5 games ahead of the second place Salina Trade Winners (40–28) in the eight–team league. Following in the standings were the Abilene Red Sox (37–30), Minneapolis Minnies (36–32), Junction City Soldiers (34–32), Beloit (33–36), Clay Center Cubs (32–37) and Manhattan Maroons (16–54).

The team became the Ellsworth Blues in 1910, winning their second consecutive Central Kansas League championship in their final season. The Blues ended the 1910 season with a record of 53–28, placing first in the final standings. Richard Ford served as manager as the Blues finished 5.0 games ahead of the Clay Center Cubs (48–33) in the eight–team league standings. The Abilene Reds (44–33), Salina Trade Winners (44–34), Concordia Travelers (43–38), Manhattan Maroons (35–43), Junction City Soldiers (34–48) and Beloit/Chapman (18–62) followed in the final standings.

Despite winning the championship, the Ellsworth Blues franchise folded after the 1910 season, as the Central Kansas League reduced to four teams for the 1911 season.

Ellsworth, Kansas has not hosted another minor league team.

== The ballpark ==
The name of the ballpark of the Ellsworth minor league teams is not known. It was noted adult admission at the Ellsworth ballpark was .25 cents. The ballpark was reportedly located Northeast of Ellsworth and had a capacity of 500.

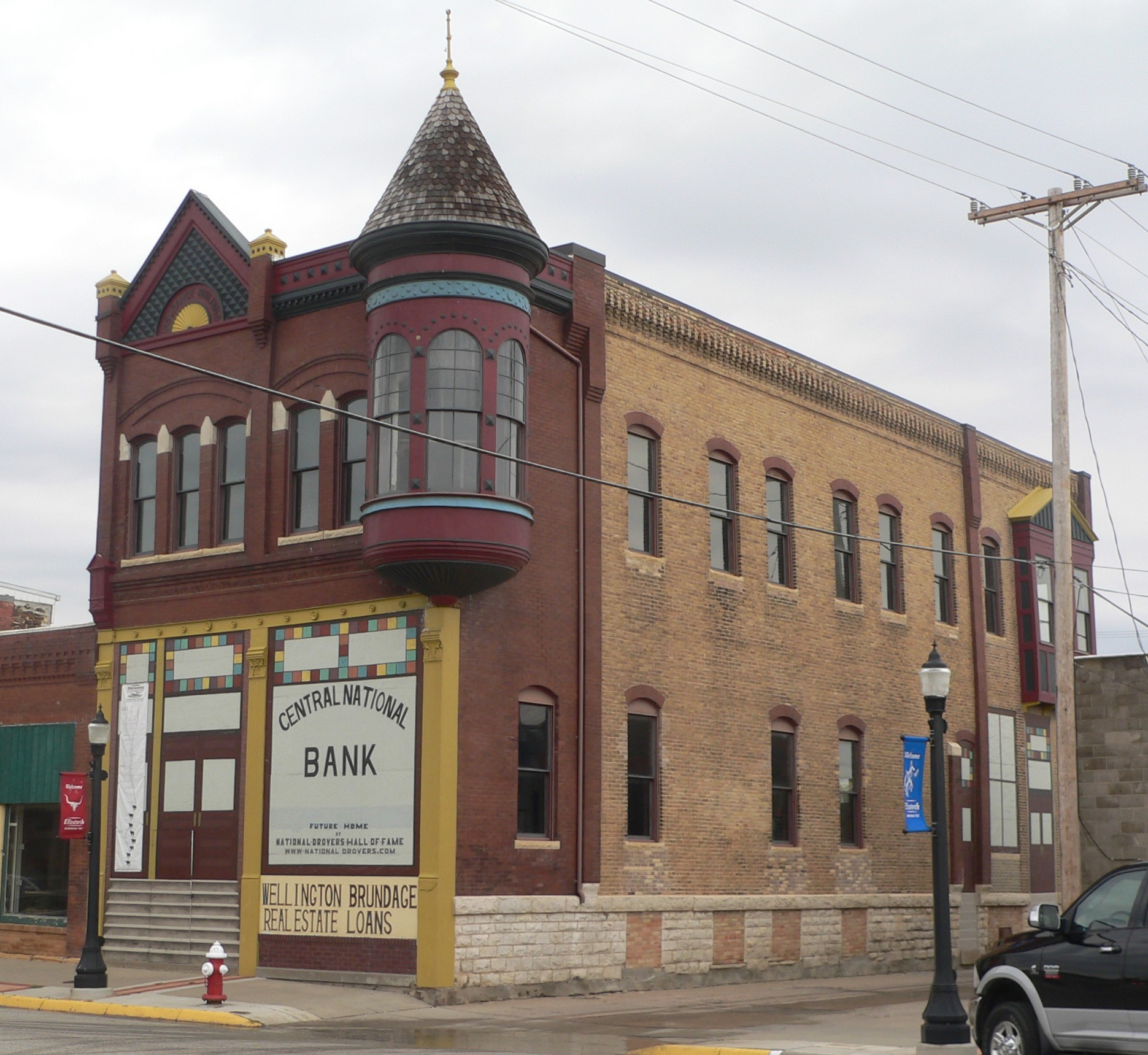
(2014) Downtown Historic District. National Register of Historic Places. Ellsworth, Kansas

== Timeline ==
Year(s)	# Yrs.	Team	Level	League
1905	1	Ellsworth	Class D	Kansas State League
1908–1909	2	Ellsworth Worthies	Class D	Central Kansas League
1910	1	Ellsworth Blues	Class D	Central Kansas League

== Year–by–year records ==
Year	Record	Finish	Manager	Playoffs/Notes
1905	34–15	1st	Arthur Relihan	League champions
1908	25–22	2nd (tie)	F.S. Foster	No playoffs held
1909	44–23	1st	George Seigle	League champions
1910	53–28	1st	Richard Ford	League champions

== Notable alumni ==
- Walt Alexander (1910)
- Fred Blanding (1909)
- Art Griggs (1905)
- Pete Johns (1910)
- Wiley Taylor (1910)

== See also ==
- Ellsworth Worthies players
- Ellsworth Blues players
- Ellsworth (minor league baseball) players
