= Manhattan Maroons =

- 1909–1913; Manhattan, Kansas

Minor league affiliations
- Class: Class D (1919–1913)
- League: Central Kansas League (1909–1912); Kansas State League (1913)

Major league affiliations
- Team: None

Minor league titles
- League titles (0): None

Team data
- Name: Manhattan Maroons (1909–1911); Manhattan Elks (1912–1913)
- Ballpark: Athletic Park (1909–1911); Southside Park (1912–1913)

The Manhattan Maroons were a minor league baseball team based in Manhattan, Kansas. From 1909 to 1911, the Maroons played as members of the Class D level Central Kansas League and were followed in the league by the 1912 Manhattan "Elks," before the franchise joined the 1913 Kansas State League. Manhattan teams hosted minor league home games at Athletic Park from 1909 to 1911, before moving to Southside Park.

== History ==
Manhattan, Kansas first hosted minor league baseball when the Manhattan "Maroons" began play in 1909. The Maroons began play as members of the eight–team Class D level Central Kansas League. The Abilene Red Sox, Beloit, Clay Center Colts, Ellsworth Blues, Junction City Soldiers, Minneapolis Minnies and Salina Trade Winners teams joined Manhattan in beginning league play on June 14, 1909.

In their first season of play, the Maroons ended the 1909 season with a record of 16–54, placing eight and last in the league. Earle Bryant, Joe Bond and Pat Murphy served as managers as the Maroons finished 29.5 games behind the first place Ellsworth Blues in the final standings.

The Manhattan Maroons placed sixth in the 1910 Central Kansas League. Playing the season under managers Frank Gardiner and Al Strong, the Maroons finished with a final record of 35–43, finishing 16.5 games behind the first place Ellsworth Blues.

The 1911 Manhattan Maroons continued play as the Central Kansas League reduced to four teams. Manhattan ended the 1911 season with a record of 28–43, placing fourth in the four–team league. With Dee Poindexter as manager, Manhattan finished 19.0 games behind the champion Concordia Travelers.

The team became known as the Manhattan Elks in 1912, continuing Central Kansas League play. The 1912 team was also referred to as the "Giants." The Elks ended the 1912 season with a record of 52–38, placing second in the six–team league. Manhattan was 2.0 games behind the first place Great Bend Millers in the final standings. Bob Kahl and Fred Moore served as the Manhattan managers in 1912. The Central Kansas League permanently folded following the 1912 season, leaving Manhattan to join a new league in 1913.

In their final season of play, the 1913 Manhattan Elks folded during the season after joining a new league. Manhattan began the season as members of the six–team Class D level Kansas State League. The 1913 team was also referred to as the "Giants." The Clay Center Colts, Great Bend Millers, Junction City Soldiers, Lyons Lions and Salina Insurgents joined with Manhattan in beginning league play on May 16, 1913.

On July 10, 1913, Manhattan folded from the Kansas State League with a record of 27–24. The Junction City Soldiers franchise had disbanded on July 9, 1910, causing Manhattan to be folded from the league on July 10, to keep an even number of teams. Fred Moore served as manager in Manhattan's final season of minor league play.

The Kansas State League played the 1914 season as a four-team league, before folding and never reformed. Manhattan, Kansas has not hosted another minor league team.

== The ballparks ==
From 1909 to 1911, the Manhattan Maroons played minor league home games at Athletic Park. The ballpark had a capacity of 2,000.

In the 1912 and 1913 seasons, the Manhattan Elks teams played home minor league games at Southside Park. The ballpark also was called Eureka Electric Park.

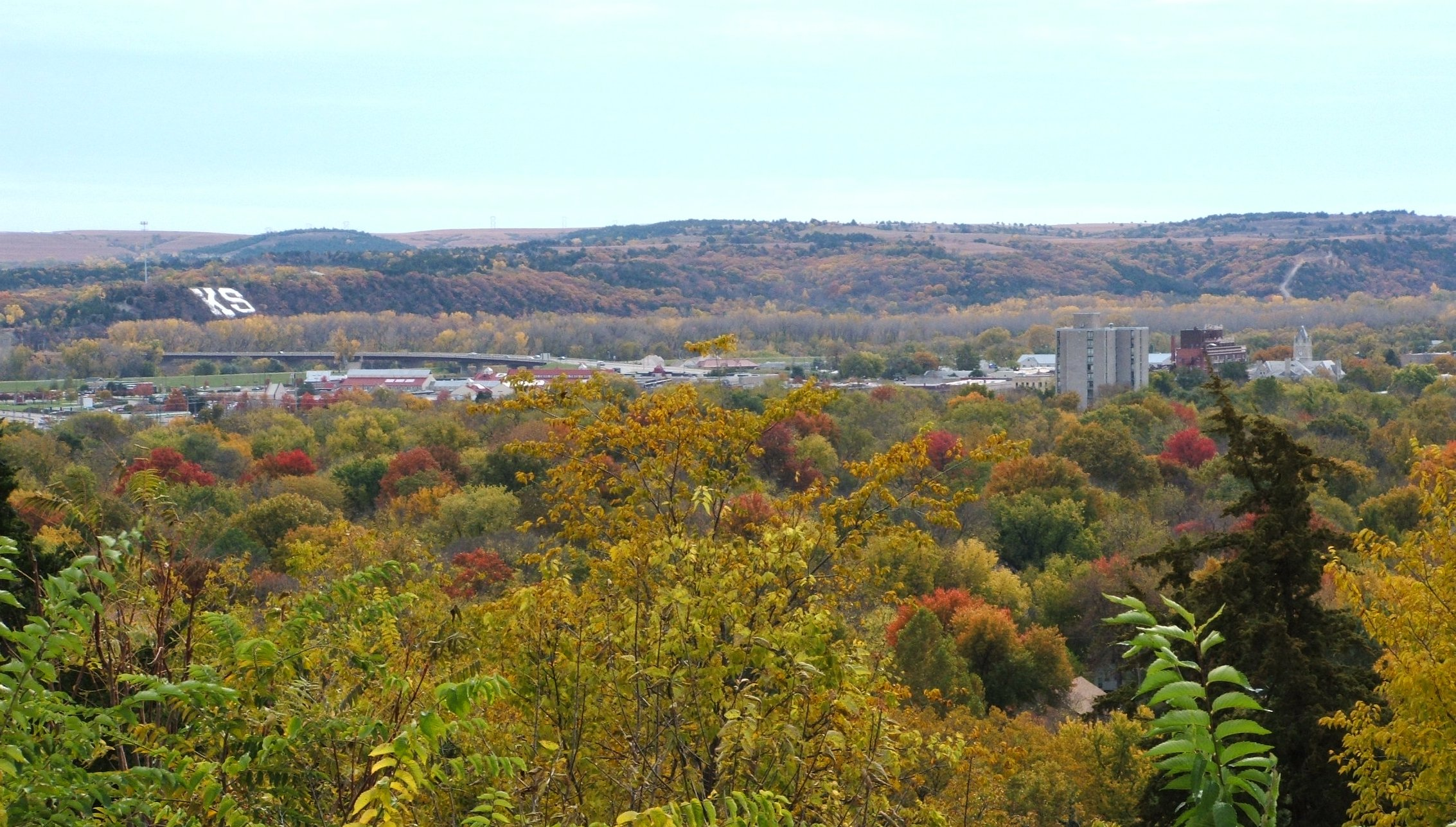
(2005) Downtown view. Manhattan, Kansas

== Timeline ==
Year(s)	# Yrs.	Team	Level	League	Ballpark
1909–1911	3	Manhattan Maroons	Class D	Central Kansas League	Athletic Park
1912	1	Manhattan Elks	Class D	Central Kansas League	Southside Park
1913	1	Manhattan Elks	Class D	Kansas State League	Southside Park

== Year–by–year records ==
Year	Record	Finish	Manager	Playoffs / notes
1909	16–54	8th	Earle Bryant / Joe Bond / Pat Murphy	No playoffs held
1910	35–43	6th	Frank Gardiner / Al Strong	No playoffs held
1911	28–43	4th	Dee Poindexter	No playoffs held
1912	52–38	2nd	Robert Kahl / Fred Moore	No playoffs held
1913	27–24	NA	Fred Moore	Team folded July 10

== Notable alumni ==
- George Aiton (1912)
- Walt Alexander (1911)
- Josh Billings (1912)
- Gene Cocreham (1912)

== See also ==
- Manhattan Maroons players
- Manhattan Elks players
