= Abilene Reds =

- 1909–1910; Abilene, Kansas

Minor league affiliations
- Class: Class D (1909–1910)
- League: Central Kansas League (1909–1910)

Minor league titles
- League titles (0): None

Team data
- Name: Abilene Red Sox (1909); Abilene Reds (1910)
- Ballpark: Abilene Ball Park (1909–1910)

The Abilene Reds were a minor league baseball team based in Abilene, Kansas. Abilene teams played the 1909 and 1910 seasons as members of the Class D level Central Kansas League. The Reds followed the 1909 Abilene "Red Sox," as Abilene hosted minor league home games at the Abilene Ball Park, which is known today as Eisenhower Park and is listed on the National Register of Historic Places.

== History ==
The 1909 Abilene Red Sox first hosted minor league baseball in Abilene, Kansas. The Red Sox began play as members of the 1909 Class D level Central Kansas League, as the league expanded from six teams to eight teams, adding Abilene. Other league members in 1909 were the Beloit team, Clay Center Cubs, Ellsworth Blues, Junction City Soldiers, Manhattan Maroons, Minneapolis Minnies and Salina Trade Winners.

In their first season of play, the Abilene Red Sox placed third in the Central Kansas League. Abilene ended the 1909 season with a record of 37–30, as F.D. Parent and Affie Wilson served as managers. Abilene finished 7.0 games behind the first place Ellsworth Blues in the standings. The final standings were led by Ellsworth (44–23), followed by the Salina Trade Winners (40–28), Abilene (37–30), Minneapolis Minnies (36–32), Junction City Soldiers (34–32), Beloit (33–36), Clay Center Colts (32–37) and Manhattan Maroons (16–54). Abilene pitcher Ora Williams led the Central Kansas League with 19 wins, 178 strikeouts and a winning percentage of .826, with a 19–4 record. Abilene played home games at the Abilene Ball Park and moved the start times from 3:45 PM to night games beginning at 6:00 PM.

In their final season of play, the 1910 Abilene Reds continued play in the 1910 Central Kansas League, finishing in third place for the second consecutive season. The Reds ended the regular season with a record 44–33, to place third under, playing the season under returning manager Affie Wilson. Abilene finished 7.0 games behind the first place Ellsworth Blues in the eight-team league. A.B. Conley of Abilene led the league in batting average with an average of.348. Abilene player Mugsy Monroe led the league with 110 total hits. Abilene permanently folded following the 1910 season, as the Central Kansas reduced to four teams in 1911.

Abilene, Kansas has not hosted a minor league baseball team since the folding of the Reds.

== The ballpark ==
The 1909 and 1910 Abilene teams played home minor league games at the Abilene Ball Park. The ballpark had a capacity of 1,000 and was located at the fairgrounds on NW Third Street. Today, the site is listed on the National Register of Historic Places. The public park is now named Eisenhower Park and is adjacent to the fairgrounds hosting the Central Kansas Free Fair. The location of Eisenhower Park is 500 Pine Street, Abilene, Kansas.

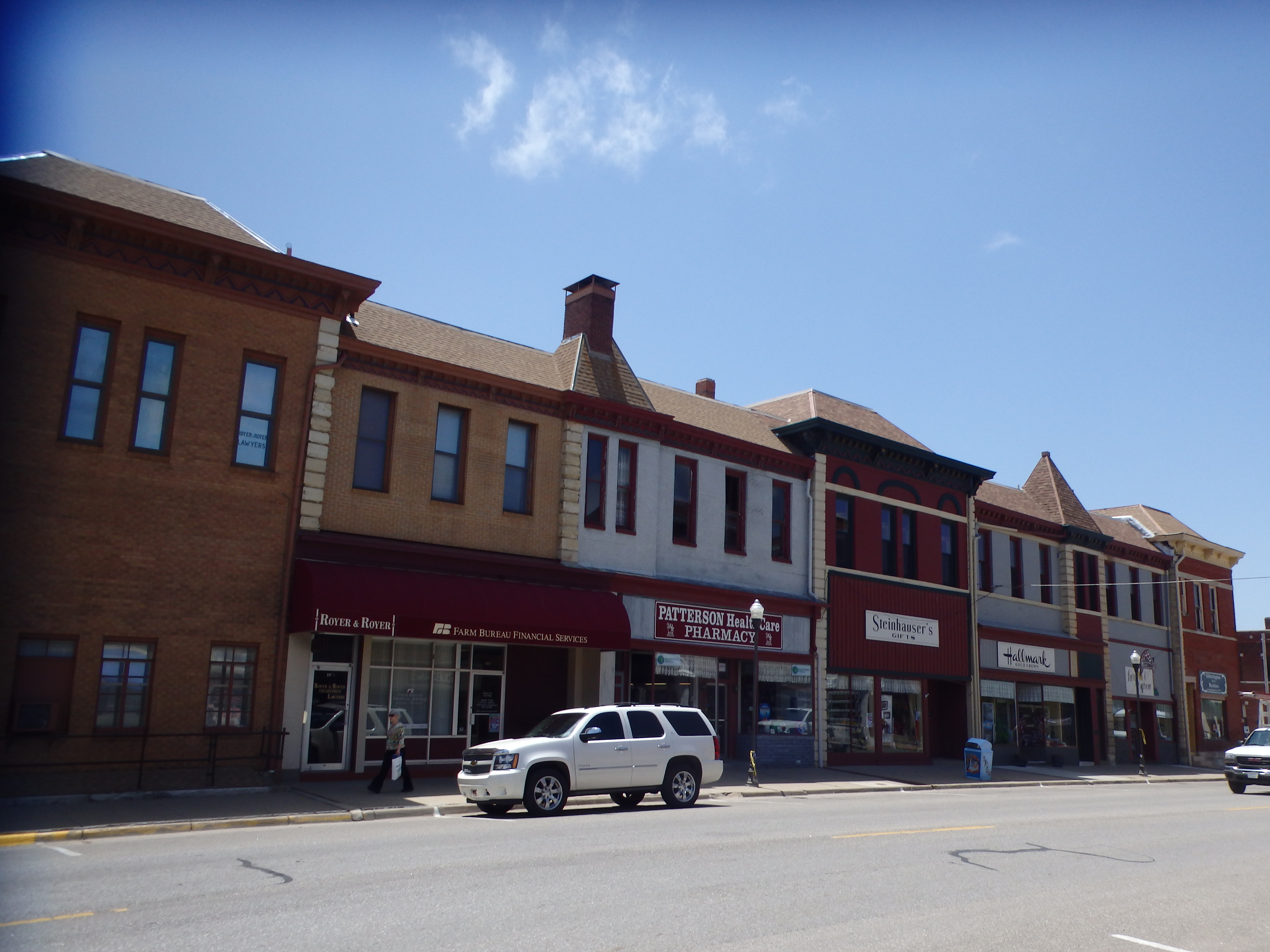
(2014) Downtown Abilene. National Register of Historic Places. Abilene, Kansas

== Timeline ==
Year(s)	# Yrs.	Team	Level	League	Ballpark
1910	1	Abilene Red Sox	Class D	Central Kansas League	Abilene Ball Park
1911	1	Abilene Reds	Class D	Central Kansas League	Abilene Ball Park

== Year–by–year records ==
Year	Record	Finish	Manager	Playoffs/Notes
1909	37–30	3rd	F.D. Parent / Affie Wilson	No playoffs held
1910	44–33	3rd	Affie Wilson	No playoffs held

== Notable alumni ==
- Gil Britton (1909–1910)
- Joe Riggert (1909)
- Charlie Wheatley (1910)

== See also ==
Abilene Red Sox players
Abilene Reds players
