= Harry Short (baseball) =

American baseball player and manager

Harry H. Short
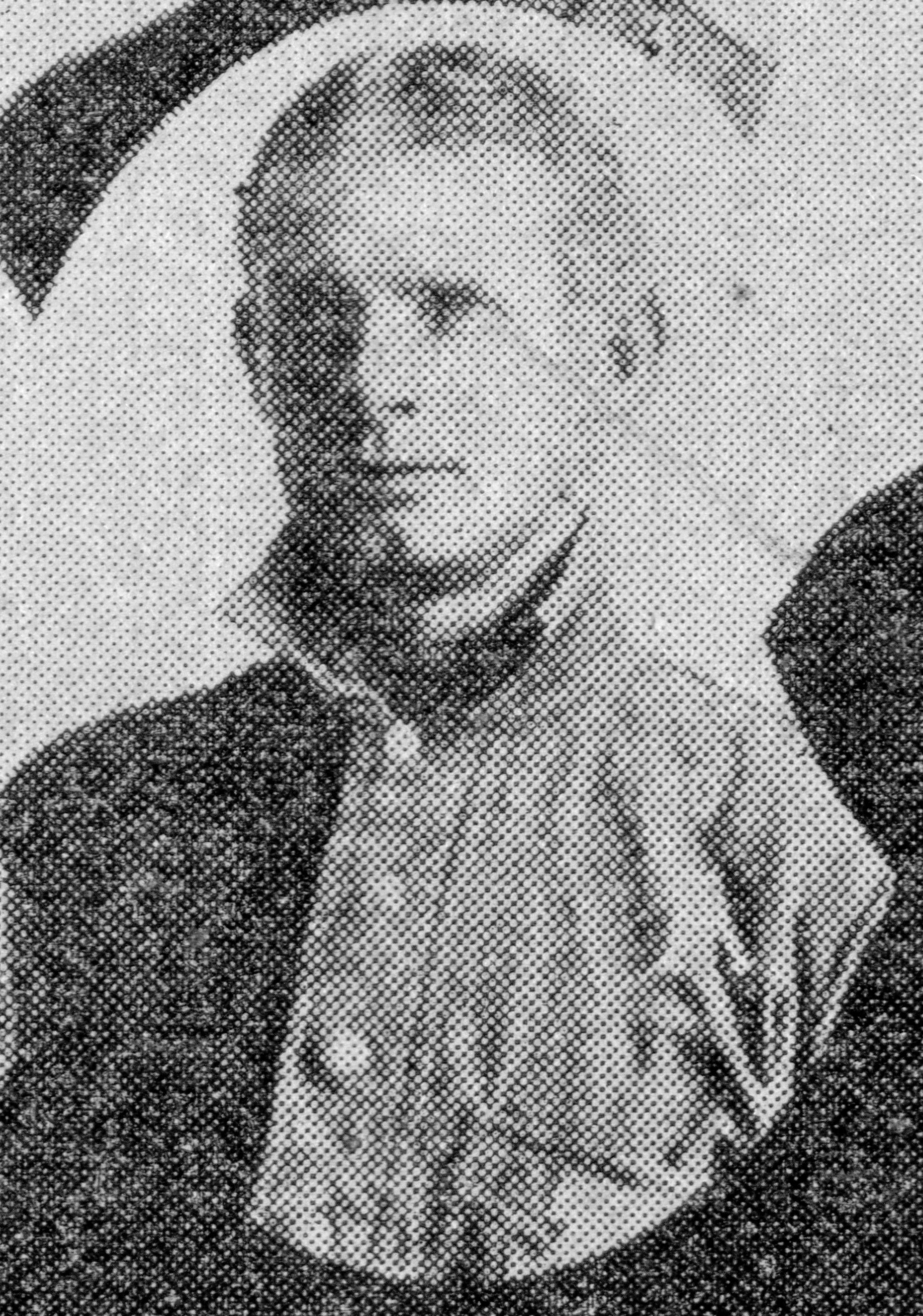
- Second baseman / Third baseman / Shortstop / Outfielder
- Born: April 16, 1878; Plymouth, Indiana, U.S.
- Died: November 20, 1954 (aged 76); Garden City, Kansas, U.S.
- Batted: Right Threw: Right

Kansas State League debut
- 1905, for the Minneapolis Minnies

Last Central Kansas League appearance
- 1911, for the Concordia Travelers

Career statistics
- Batting average: .254
- Stolen bases: 210

Teams
- Playing career: Minneapolis Minnies (1905); Austin Senators (1906–1908); Houston Buffaloes/Waco Navigators (1909); Concordia Travelers (1910–1911); Managerial career: Concordia Travelers (1910–1911)

Career highlights and awards
- League leader stolen bases, 1907; League championships 1906, 1907, 1910, 1911

Harry H. Short (April 16, 1878 in Plymouth, Indiana – November 20, 1954 in Garden City, Kansas) was an American minor league baseball player and manager. He played on two Texas League championship Austin Senators teams (in 1906 and 1907), and led the league in stolen bases in 1907 with 78.

== Playing career ==
Short grew up in Concordia, Kansas; his younger brother was Clyde Short who would go on to become Chairman of the Kansas Democratic Party.

Harry Short attended Kansas State Normal College and played shortstop on the college team. After subsequently playing on semi-professional teams in Concordia, where he became known for his strong fielding and speed, he entered minor league baseball in 1904 with a team in New Bern, North Carolina. In 1905 he played for the Minneapolis Minnies of the Kansas State League. In 1906, he was recruited by, and played third base (and other positions) for, the Austin Senators, who were part of the South Texas League that year. The 1906 Senators won their league championship by default when the Houston Buffaloes refused to stop using non-league players. He remained with the Senators in 1907, a year in which he led the league in stolen bases with 78 and won another league championship.

During 1907, the Senators would post one of the most lopsided victories in baseball history, by defeating the San Antonio Bronchos in the second game of a doubleheader 44–0. During this game, Short scored seven runs on five hits, stole four bases and hit a double and a triple. He was referred to in articles as "one of the fastest baserunners and best base-stealers in Texas", and was also a fan-favorite that year to take over managing the Senators team.

Short played again for Austin in 1908, then began 1909 with the Houston Buffaloes before being traded to the Waco Navigators for Hub Northen (who would go on to play for the Cincinnati Reds, Brooklyn Dodgers, and St. Louis Browns). In 1910, he left the Texas League for the Central Kansas League, where he became player-manager of the Concordia Travelers. The Travelers won league championships in 1910 and 1911, and during the latter season, the Travelers and Short were accused by the Clay Center Cubs of "throwing games" to the Junction City Soldiers, which was hotly debated in opposing newspapers columns in both towns. After the Central Kansas League folded, he continued to play for local Kansas teams until at least 1915.

== Managerial career ==
=== Year-by-year managerial record ===
Year	Team	League	Finish
1910	Concordia Travelers	Central Kansas League	1st
1911	Concordia Travelers	Central Kansas League	1st

During his early career as a player-manager, Short's teams were often referred to as "Short's Boosters" or "Short's Travelers". In his first two managing seasons, he played with and coached Chick Smith and the Travelers won their league championship. After the Central Kansas League folded, Short went on to manage and play for a number of other teams for other baseball leagues throughout Kansas.
