= Minneapolis High School =

Location
- 602 Woodland Avenue; Minneapolis, Ottawa County, Kansas 67467; United States
- 39.1464°N 97.6991°W

Information
- School type: Public
- School district: North Ottawa County USD 239
- NCES District ID: 2721240
- Superintendent: Curtis Stevens
- Principal: Jay Macy
- Grades: 7-12
- Enrollment: 307
- Colors: Red, White
- Mascot: Lion
- Website: https://www.usd239.org/page/mjshs

Minneapolis High School (MHS), also known as Minneapolis Jr/Sr High School (MJSHS), is in Minneapolis, Kansas. It serves grades 7 to 12. It is in North Ottawa County USD 239. The school is in a remote rural area and in 2025 90 percent of students were white and five percent Hispanic.

George W. Carver attended the school when he lived in rural Kansas in the early 1880s. A graduate of the school attended Lawrence Scientific School at Harvard University circa 1895. A manager of athletics at Salina High School wrote about the area's high school football teams in 1909.

Lions are the school mascot. Its football team competes in District 7 of Class 2A. The school has a sports hall of fame. In 2025 Garrett Galanski was announced as the school's football coach.

A historical marker commemorates George W. Carver attending school in Minneapolis from 1880 to 1884.

== Notable alumni ==
- George Washington Carver was an alumnus.

== See also ==
- List of high schools in Kansas
- Minneapolis Minnies (Kansas)
