= Salina Coyotes =

- 1898–1952; (1898, 1908–1910, 1912–1914); Salina, Kansas

Minor league affiliations
- Class: Class D (1898, 1908–1910, 1912–1914)
- League: Kansas State League (1898); Central Kansas League (1908–1910, 1912)

Major league affiliations
- Team: None

Minor league titles
- League titles (1): 1898

Team data
- Name: Salina Blues (1898); Salina Trade Winners (1908–1910); Salina Insurgents (1912–1913); Salina Coyotes (1914)
- Ballpark: Athletic Park (1898–1914)

The Salina Coyotes was the final moniker of minor league baseball teams based in Salina, Kansas between 1898 and 1914. In that span, Salina teams played as members of the Class D level Kansas State League (1898), Central Kansas League (1908–1910, 1912), and Kansas State League (1913–1914), winning the 1898 league championship. The early Salina teams hosted minor league games at Athletic Park. The Coyotes were succeeded by the 1922 Salina Millers of the Southwestern League.

== History ==
Minor league baseball began in 1898 with the Salina Blues, who moved twice and played championship baseball as members of the Class D level Kansas State League. The Blues won the league championship with a 9–5 record, having the best overall record when the league folded. The franchise moved to Junction City, Kansas on August 4, 1989 and back to Salina on August 8, 1898 before the league disbanded on Aug 19, 1898.

The Salina Trade Winners joined the 1908 Class D level Central Kansas League as charter members in the new league. Other 1908 charter members were the Ellsworth Blues, Little River, Kansas, McPherson Merry Macks, Minneapolis Minnies and Newton Browns.

Playing in the Central Kansas League, Salina placed 4th with a 24–23 record in 1908, playing under managers Bobby Cassell and Dick Brown. Salina placed 2nd in the league standings with a 40–28 record in 1909. Salina placed 4th in the standings with 44–34 record in 1910. The league had expanded to an eight–team league in 1909. After the 1910 season, four teams in the Central Kansas League folded, including Salina.

The Salina Insurgents returned to membership in the six–team Central Kansas League in 1912. The Salina Insurgents finished last with a 31–59 record, to place 6th under manager Burt Lamb in the final season of the league. The Central Kansas League folded permanently after the 1912 season.

In 1913, the Salina Insurgents continued play and joined the six–team Class D level Kansas State League. The Manhattan Giants and Junction City Soldiers folded from the league mid–season. The Salina Insurgents completed the season and finished with a 26–63 record, placing 4th in the Kansas State League. The managers were Mike Welday and Lon Ury.

Continuing play in the four–team Class D level Kansas State League in 1914, Salina renamed as the Salina Coyotes. The Salina Coyotes placed 2nd, with a 47–41 record in 1914, finishing 8.0 games behind the 1st place Emporia Bidwells, playing the season under manager Richard Rohn. The Kansas State League folded permanently after the completion of the 1914 season.

Salina was without a team until the Salina Millers began play as members of the 1922 Class C level Southwestern League.

== The ballparks ==
Early Salina minor league teams hosted home minor league games at Athletic Park between 1898 and 1914.

== Timeline ==
Year(s)	# Yrs.	Team	Level	League	Ballpark
1898	1	Salina Blues	Class D	Kansas State League	Athletic Park
1908–1910	3	Salina Trade Winners	Class D	Central Kansas League	Athletic Park
1912	1	Salina Insurgents	Class D	Central Kansas League	Athletic Park
1913	1	Salina Insurgents	Class D	Kansas State League	Athletic Park
1914	1	Salina Coyotes	Class D	Kansas State League	Athletic Park

== Year–by–year records ==
Year	Record	Finish	Manager	Playoffs/notes
1898	9-5	1st	Judge R. L. Head	League folded August 19; League champions
1908	24-23	4th	Frank Everhart	No playoffs held
1909	40-28	2nd	Ernie Quigley	No playoffs held
1910	44-34	4th	Elmer Meredith	No playoffs held
1912	31–59	6th	Bert Lamb	No playoffs held
1913	26–63	4th	Lon Ury / Mike Welday	No playoffs held
1914	47–41	2nd	Richard Rohn	No playoffs held

== Notable alumni ==
- George Aiton (1913)
- Claude Hendrix (1909)
- Fred Liese (1913)
- John Misse (1908-1910)
- Ernie Quigley (1909, MGR) Inducted, Naismith Memorial Basketball Hall of Fame
- Elmer Stricklett (1898)
- Lon Ury (1913, MGR)
- Mike Welday (1913, MGR)

== See also ==
- Salina Blues players
- Salina Insurgents players
- Salina Trade Winners players

== External references ==
- Salina - Baseball Reference
