= Central Kansas League =

- Formerly: Kansas State League
- Classification: Class D (1908–1912)
- Sport: Minor League Baseball
- First season: 1908
- Folded: 1912
- Replaced by: Kansas State League
- President: Ralph W. Hoffman (1909–1910); H. Cramer(1910); C.A. Case (1911); Roy C. Gafford (1911–1912)
- No. of teams: 15
- Country: United States of America
- Most titles: 2 Ellsworth Blues (1909–1910)

The Central Kansas League was a Class D level baseball league established in 1908, playing through 1912. Member teams were based exclusively in Kansas. The Central Kansas League evolved from and into the Kansas State League.

== History ==
The original Kansas State League ceased independent operations in 1911, combined with the Central Kansas League. After five seasons of play, the Central Kansas League subsequently changed its name to back to the Kansas State League for the 1913 and 1914 seasons before disestablishing. The league champions in 1909 and 1910 were the Ellsworth Blues.

There is an ongoing debate about whether former US President Dwight Eisenhower played professional baseball in 1911 for the Junction City Soldiers prior to attending West Point.

== Cities represented ==
This is a complete list of the teams which played under the Central Kansas League.

- Abilene, KS: Abilene Red Sox (1909); Abilene Reds (1910)
- Beloit, KS: Beloit (1909–1910)
- Chapman, KS: Chapman (1910)
- Clay Center, KS: Clay Center Cubs (1909–1911)
- Concordia, KS: Concordia Travelers (1910–1911)
- Ellsworth, KS: Ellsworth Worthies (1908–1910)
- Great Bend, KS: Great Bend Millers (1912)
- Junction City, KS: Junction City Soldiers (1909–1912)
- Little River, KS: Little River (1908)
- Lyons, KS: Lyons Lions (1912)
- Manhattan, KS: Manhattan Maroons (1909–1911); Manhattan Giants (1912)
- McPherson, KS: McPherson Merry Macks (1908)
- Minneapolis, KS: Minneapolis Minnies (1908–1909, 1912)
- Newton, KS: Newton Browns (1908); Newton Railroaders (1912)
- Salina, KS: Salina Trade Winners (1908–1910); Salina Insurgents (1912)

== Standings & statistics ==
1908 Central Kansas League - schedule

| Team standings | W | L | PCT | GB | Managers |
|---|---|---|---|---|---|
| Minneapolis Minnies | 31 | 19 | .620 | - | Ben Young |
| Newton Browns | 25 | 22 | .532 | 4½ | Carl Becker |
| Ellsworth Blues | 25 | 22 | .532 | 4½ | F.S. Foster |
| Salina Trade Winners | 24 | 23 | .511 | 5½ | Frank Everhart |
| McPherson Merry Macks | 20 | 27 | .426 | 9½ | Davis |
| Little River | 18 | 30 | .375 | 12 | G.W. Hamilton / I.C. Meyer |

1909 Central Kansas League

| Team standings | W | L | PCT | GB | Managers |
|---|---|---|---|---|---|
| Ellsworth Blues | 44 | 23 | .657 | - | George Seigle |
| Salina Trade Winners | 40 | 28 | .588 | 4½ | Ernie Quigley |
| Abilene Red Sox | 37 | 30 | .552 | 7 | F.D. Parent / Affie Wilson |
| Minneapolis Minnies | 36 | 32 | .529 | ½ | Roy Gafford / Harry Short |
| Junction City Soldiers | 34 | 32 | .515 | 9½ | Lewis Armstrong / Tom Campbell |
| Beloit | 33 | 36 | .478 | 12 | Hi Ebright |
| Clay Center Cubs | 32 | 37 | .464 | 13 | Lee Gramley |
| Manhattan Maroons | 16 | 54 | .229 | 29½ | Earle Bryant / Murphy |

No Playoffs held

Player statistics
| Player | Team | Stat | Tot | Player | Team | Stat | Tot |
|---|---|---|---|---|---|---|---|
| Tom Campbell | Junction City | BA | .335 | Ora Williams | Abilene | W | 19 |
| James Whalen | Junction City | Runs | 49 | Ora Williams | Abilene | SO | 178 |
| Claude Jennings | Minneapolis | Hits | 72 | Ora Williams | Abilene | Pct | .826; 19-4 |

1910 Central Kansas League - schedule

| Team standings | W | L | PCT | GB | Managers |
|---|---|---|---|---|---|
| Ellsworth Blues | 53 | 28 | .654 | - | Dick Ford |
| Clay Center Cubs | 48 | 33 | .593 | 5 | Lee Gramley |
| Abilene Reds | 44 | 33 | .571 | 7 | Affie Wilson |
| Salina Trade Winners | 44 | 34 | .564 | 7½ | Elmer Meredith |
| Concordia Travelers | 43 | 38 | .531 | 10 | Harry Short |
| Manhattan Maroons | 35 | 43 | .449 | 16½ | Jim Gardiner |
| Junction City Soldiers | 34 | 48 | .415 | 19½ | Ernie Quigley / Thomas Dugan / Cecil Bankhead |
| Beloit / Chapman | 18 | 62 | .225 | 34½ | Ben Dimond / Jim Green |

Beloit moved to Chapman July 20.

Player statistics
| Player | Team | Stat | Tot | Player | Team | Stat | Tot |
|---|---|---|---|---|---|---|---|
| A.B. Conley | Abilene | BA | .348 | Paul Stokesberry | Clay Center | W | 19 |
| Walter Wentz | Clay Center | Runs | 53 | Otis Peebles | Ellsworth | Pct | .769; 10-3 |
| Mugsy Monroe | Abilene | Hits | 110 | | | | |

1911 Central Kansas League

| Team standings | W | L | PCT | GB | Managers |
|---|---|---|---|---|---|
| Concordia Travelers | 44 | 27 | .620 | - | Harry Short / Roy Gafford |
| Junction City Soldiers | 40 | 31 | .563 | 4 | Cecil Bankhead |
| Clay Center Cubs | 33 | 38 | .465 | 11 | Lee Gramley |
| Manhattan Maroons | 25 | 46 | .352 | 19 | Dee Poindexter |

:eague disbanded July 21.
Playoff: Concordia 4 games, Junction City 3.

Player statistics
| Player | Team | Stat | Tot | Player | Team | Stat | Tot |
|---|---|---|---|---|---|---|---|
| Gilbert Britton | Clay Center | BA | .347 | G.H. Jepson | Junction City | W | 21 |
| Claude Jennings | Clay Center | Runs | 53 | G.H. Jepson | Junction City | Pct | .724; 21-8 |
| Gilbert Britton | Clay Center | Hits | 90 | | | | |
| Claude Jennings | Clay Center | SB | 30 | | | | |

1912 Central Kansas League - schedule

| Team standings | W | L | PCT | GB | Managers |
|---|---|---|---|---|---|
| Great Bend Millers | 54 | 36 | .600 | - | Affie Wilson |
| Manhattan Giants | 52 | 38 | .578 | 2 | Robert Kahl / Fred Moore / Nick Kohl |
| Newton Railroaders/ Minneapolis Minnies | 50 | 40 | .555 | 4 | A. Stillwell |
| Junction City Soldiers | 47 | 43 | .522 | 7 | Cecil Bankhead |
| Lyons Lions | 36 | 54 | .400 | 18 | Fred Wilson |
| Salina Insurgents | 31 | 59 | .344 | 23 | Bert Lamb |

Newton moved to Minneapolis July 12.
No Playoffs held

Player statistics
| Player | Team | Stat | Tot | Player | Team | Stat | Tot |
|---|---|---|---|---|---|---|---|
| Muggsy Monroe | Newt/Minn | BA | .352 | Fred Hagg | Manhattan | W | 18 |
| Burnham Smith | Manhattan | Runs | 88 | Elmer Brown | Great Bend | W | 18 |
| Muggsy Monroe | Newt/Minn | Hits | 118 | Fred Hagg | Manhattan | Pct | .750; 18-6 |

== Notable players ==
- Fred Blanding (played under a pseudonym)
- Harry Chapman
- John Misse
- Ross Reynolds
- Harry Short
- Chick Smith
