= Ada, Kansas =

Unincorporated community in Ottawa County, Kansas

- Unincorporated community and CDP
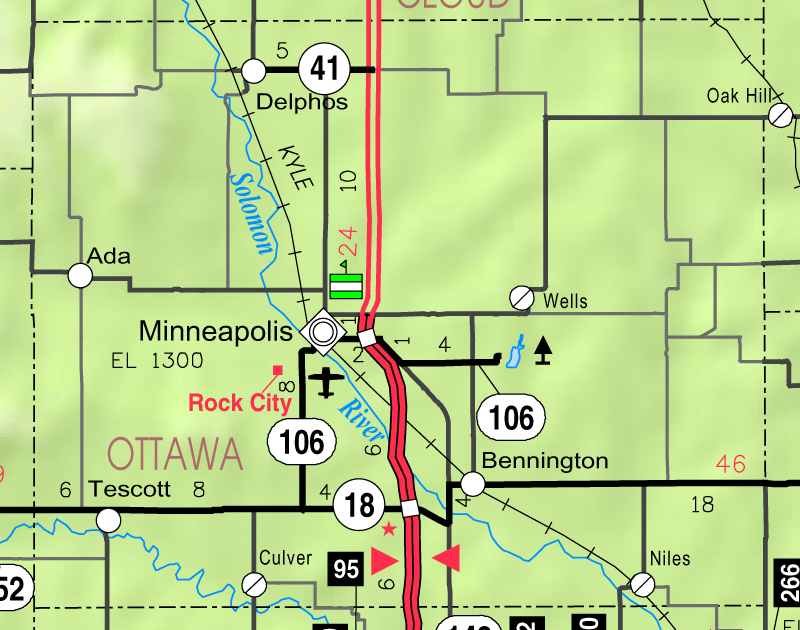
- KDOT map of Ottawa County (legend)

- Location within Kansas Location within the United States
- Coordinates: 39°09′42″N 97°53′00″W
- Country: United States
- State: Kansas
- County: Ottawa
- Township: Fountain
- Elevation: 1,322 ft (403 m)

Population (2020)
  - Total: 86
- Time zone: UTC-6 (CST)
  - Summer (DST): UTC-5 (CDT)
- Area code: 785
- FIPS code: 20-00225
- GNIS ID: 2583496

Ada is an unincorporated community and census-designated place (CDP) in Ottawa County, Kansas, United States. As of the 2020 census, the population was 86. It is located approximately 12 miles west of Minneapolis.

== History ==
Ottawa County was formed in 1860 and organized in 1866. A post office was opened in Ada in 1872, and remained in operation until it was discontinued in 1998.

In 1888, a rail line of the Chicago, Kansas and Western Railroad opened from Manchester, Kansas in the east to Barnard in the west, a 43 mi (69 km) line, with a depot in Ada. The Atchison, Topeka and Santa Fe Railway acquired this railroad in 1901. An application was filed in 1983 to abandon this "Minneapolis District" line.

== Demographics ==
Historical population
Census	Pop.	Note	%±
2010	100		—
2020	86		−14.0%
U.S. Decennial Census

The 2020 United States census counted 86 people, 34 households, and 20 families in Ada. The population density was 33.8 per square mile (13.1/km^{2}). There were 54 housing units at an average density of 21.3 per square mile (8.2/km^{2}). The racial makeup was 84.88% (73) white or European American (84.88% non-Hispanic white), 2.33% (2) black or African-American, 0.0% (0) Native American or Alaska Native, 0.0% (0) Asian, 0.0% (0) Pacific Islander or Native Hawaiian, 0.0% (0) from other races, and 12.79% (11) from two or more races. Hispanic or Latino of any race was 6.98% (6) of the population.

Of the 34 households, 20.6% had children under the age of 18; 41.2% were married couples living together; 23.5% had a female householder with no spouse or partner present. 38.2% of households consisted of individuals and 17.6% had someone living alone who was 65 years of age or older. The average household size was 2.7 and the average family size was 3.1. The percent of those with a bachelor's degree or higher was estimated to be 2.3% of the population.

24.4% of the population was under the age of 18, 8.1% from 18 to 24, 17.4% from 25 to 44, 23.3% from 45 to 64, and 26.7% who were 65 years of age or older. The median age was 46.5 years. For every 100 females, there were 75.5 males. For every 100 females ages 18 and older, there were 80.6 males.

The 2016–2020 5-year American Community Survey estimates show that the median household income was $33,798 (with a margin of error of +/- $143) and the median family income was $33,808 (+/- $208).

== Education ==
The community is served by North Ottawa County USD 239 public school district.

Ada High School was closed through school unification in 1965. The Ada High School mascot was the Wildcat.
