= Sumnerville, Kansas =

Unincorporated community in Ottawa County, Kansas

Coordinates: 39°11′51″N 97°44′11″W

Sumnerville is an unincorporated community in Ottawa County, Kansas, United States. It is located north of Minneapolis.

== History ==
A post office was opened in Sumnerville in 1867, and remained in operation until it was discontinued in 1895.

== Education ==
The community is served by North Ottawa County USD 239 public school district.
