= Ross Reynolds =

American baseball player (1887–1970)

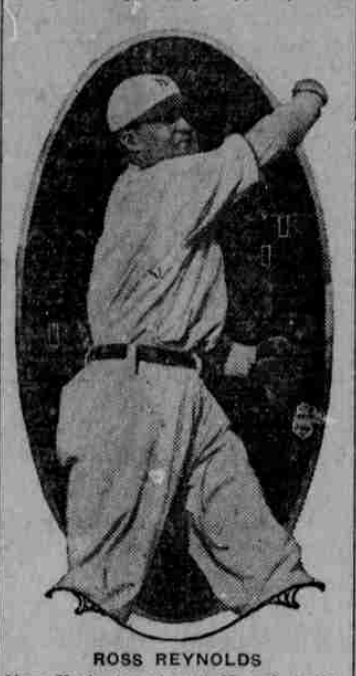
- Pitcher
- Born: August 20, 1887; Barksdale, Texas, U.S.
- Died: June 23, 1970 (aged 82); Ada, Oklahoma, U.S.
- Batted: Unknown Threw: Right

MLB debut
- May 2, 1914, for the Detroit Tigers

Last MLB appearance
- May 1, 1915, for the Detroit Tigers

MLB statistics
- Win–loss record: 5–4
- Strikeouts: 33
- Earned run average: 2.62
- Stats at Baseball Reference

Teams
- Detroit Tigers (1914–1915)

Ross Ernest Reynolds (August 20, 1887 – June 23, 1970), nicknamed "Doc", was a right-handed American professional baseball pitcher.

He played professional baseball for five years from 1912 to 1916, including two seasons in Major League Baseball for the Detroit Tigers in 1914 and 1915. Known for his ability to throw a spitball with control, he appeared in 30 games, nine as a starter, and compiled a 5–4 win–loss record and a 2.62 earned run average. As a rookie in 1914, he compiled a 2.08 ERA and defeated Walter Johnson in a 2–1 decision on August 25, 1914.

Reynolds also played in the minor leagues for a team in Minneapolis, Kansas (1912) and for the Topeka Kaws (1912–1913), the Louisville Colonels (1915), and the Denver Bears. Arm troubles ended his career in 1916 at age 29.

== Early years ==
Reynolds was born in Barksdale, Texas, in 1887. He grew up and made his home in Wetumka, Oklahoma. He was six feet, two inches tall, weighed 185 pounds, and threw and batted right-handed.

== Professional baseball ==
=== Minneapolis and Topeka ===
Reynold began his professional baseball career in 1912 at age 25, playing for the Minneapolis Minnies in the Central Kansas League. He compiled a 17–11 record in 30 games for Minneapolis.

In August 1912, Reynolds was purchased from Minneapolis by the Topeka Kaws of the Western League for $300 down and another $300 if Reynolds "made good." In September 1912, the Cincinnati Reds drafted Reynolds, but they drafted him from Minneapolis rather than Topeka. On that basis, Topeka was able to nullify the draft in proceedings before the national commission, and Reynolds remained with Topeka for the 1913 season. On July 21, 1913, he pitched a no-hitter into the eighth inning and shut out Wichita by a 5–0 score.

=== Detroit Tigers ===
On August 1, 1913, the Detroit Tigers purchased Reynolds from Topeka for $5,000, consisting of $4,000 in cash and two players. The sum was the highest price ever received by the Topeka club for the sale of a player. The agreement allowed Reynolds to remain with Topeka through the end of the 1913 season. At the time of the sale, Reynolds was described as "a big fellow and has just as much stuff left in the ninth inning as he starts out with in the first."

At the end of spring training in 1914, manager Hughie Jennings had decided to send Reynolds to the minor leagues, but pitcher Jean Dubuc persuaded team owner Frank Navin to keep Reynolds on the Tigers' lineup. Dubuc opined that Reynolds had the best control of a spitball he had ever seen. Dubuc added: "If you want a 'Walsh in the bud,' keep this fellow. He has a fine spit-ball, good control, holds men on the sacks and has plenty of nerve. He's a comer or I don't know anything about pitching." Detroit sports writer E. A. Batchelor had this to say about Reynolds: "He is well over six feet, broad-shouldered and deep chested and has one of those square jaws which denotes courage under fire."

The Tigers followed Dubuc's advice and used Reynolds principally as a relief pitcher during the 1914 season. Reynolds appeared in 26 games for the Tigers in 1914, seven as a starter, compiling a 5–3 record with a 2.08 earned run average (ERA). His ERA was ninth best in the American League.

on August 25, 1914, Reynolds allowed only five hits and won a pitching duel with Walter Johnson, as the Tigers defeated the Washington Senators, 2–1. Reynolds scored the winning run after Johnson misplayed his bunt, allowing it to roll through his legs. After advancing to second base, Ty Cobb got a base hit to right field, and Johnson deflected the throw to the plate allowing Reynolds to score.

In 1915, Reynolds appeared in only four games for the Tigers, two as a starter, all early in the season. His ERA soared to 6.35 as he gave up eight earned runs, 17 hits and five bases on balls in 11-1/3 innings pitched. He appeared in his last major league game on May 1, 1915. According to one account, his "old fault of wildness" bothered Reynolds in early games for the Tigers.

=== Louisville and Denver ===
On May 16, 1915, Reynolds was sold to the Louisville Colonels and appeared in 15 games for the Colonels during the 1915 season. On August 9, 1915, Reynolds was fined and suspended for the remainder of the season for failing to observe the club's training rules. He was reportedly not "in condition to play good base ball."

In March 1916, the Louisville club sold Reynolds to the Denver Bears of the Western League. His release was a surprise to Louisville fans given the progress Reynolds had made during spring practice. He had reportedly shown up in "superb condition" and had been "one of the hardest workers in the training camp." Reynolds appeared in 18 games for Denver and compiled a 4–7 record with a 3.03 ERA. On July 8, 1916, having suffered from "a bad arm," Reynolds was released by the Denver club.

== Later years ==
Reynolds died in Ada, Oklahoma, in 1970, at age 82.
