= Lindsey, Kansas =

Unincorporated community in Ottawa County, Kansas

- Unincorporated community
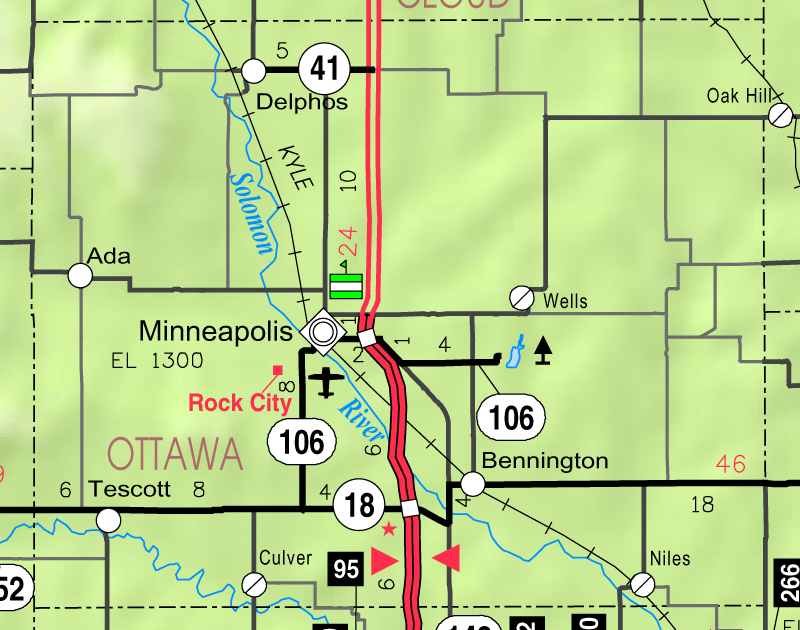
- KDOT map of Ottawa County (legend)

- Location within Kansas Location within the United States
- Coordinates: 39°5′37″N 97°40′41″W
- Country: United States
- State: Kansas
- County: Ottawa
- Elevation: 1,240 ft (380 m)
- Time zone: UTC-6 (CST)
  - Summer (DST): UTC-5 (CDT)
- ZIP Code: 67467
- Area code: 785
- FIPS code: 20-41400
- GNIS ID: 476462

Lindsey is an unincorporated community in Ottawa County, Kansas, United States, less than 1 mile (1.6 km) southeast of Minneapolis. A railroad line belonging to Kyle Railroad runs through the center of the community, but does not have a siding or stop in Lindsey. Only one road (which is paved with asphalt), North 135th Road, runs through the community. Lindsey consists of about a half dozen residences.

== History ==
Lindsey was settled in 1864, shortly after Fort Solomon was constructed a bit less than 0.5 miles (0.80 km) west of the Lindsey townsite. Lindsey was named for Lindsey Creek, approximately 1 mile (1.6 km) to the north. Lindsey Creek was named after a trapper named Lindsey, who had trapped in the area since 1857. Lindsey was the first county seat of Ottawa County. It was built in proximity to Fort Solomon, so the town could take advantage of the protection the fort offered.

By the late 1860s the use of Fort Solomon was coming to an end, as problems between the white settlers and the Indians disappeared. By 1871, the fort had only a few cabins left. Lindsey was in decline as well, and by this time was no longer the county seat.

Today Lindsey consists of about a half-dozen residences and no businesses.

== Education ==
The community is served by North Ottawa County USD 239 public school district.
