= Eisenhower baseball controversy =

Allegations that D.D. Eisenhower played minor league baseball before attending the USMA

The Eisenhower baseball controversy refers to the allegations that the general and President of the United States, Dwight Eisenhower, played minor league baseball for pay under an alias before he attended the United States Military Academy at West Point. If so, he would not have been considered an amateur athlete under the rules of the time and would have been ineligible to play football for the academy. The evidence of Eisenhower playing minor league baseball is circumstantial and poorly documented, and is subject to a range of interpretations.

Evidence in favor of the allegations include Eisenhower's stories alluding to playing semi-professional baseball. However, Eisenhower's stories contain contradictions, and there are no contemporary news stories or box scores mentioning Eisenhower during the years that he might have played. It is possible that Eisenhower may have played under an alias, with some specifically identifying a 1911 potential phantom player named "Wilson", who played 10 games for a Junction City, Kansas team as a possibility.

== Controversy ==
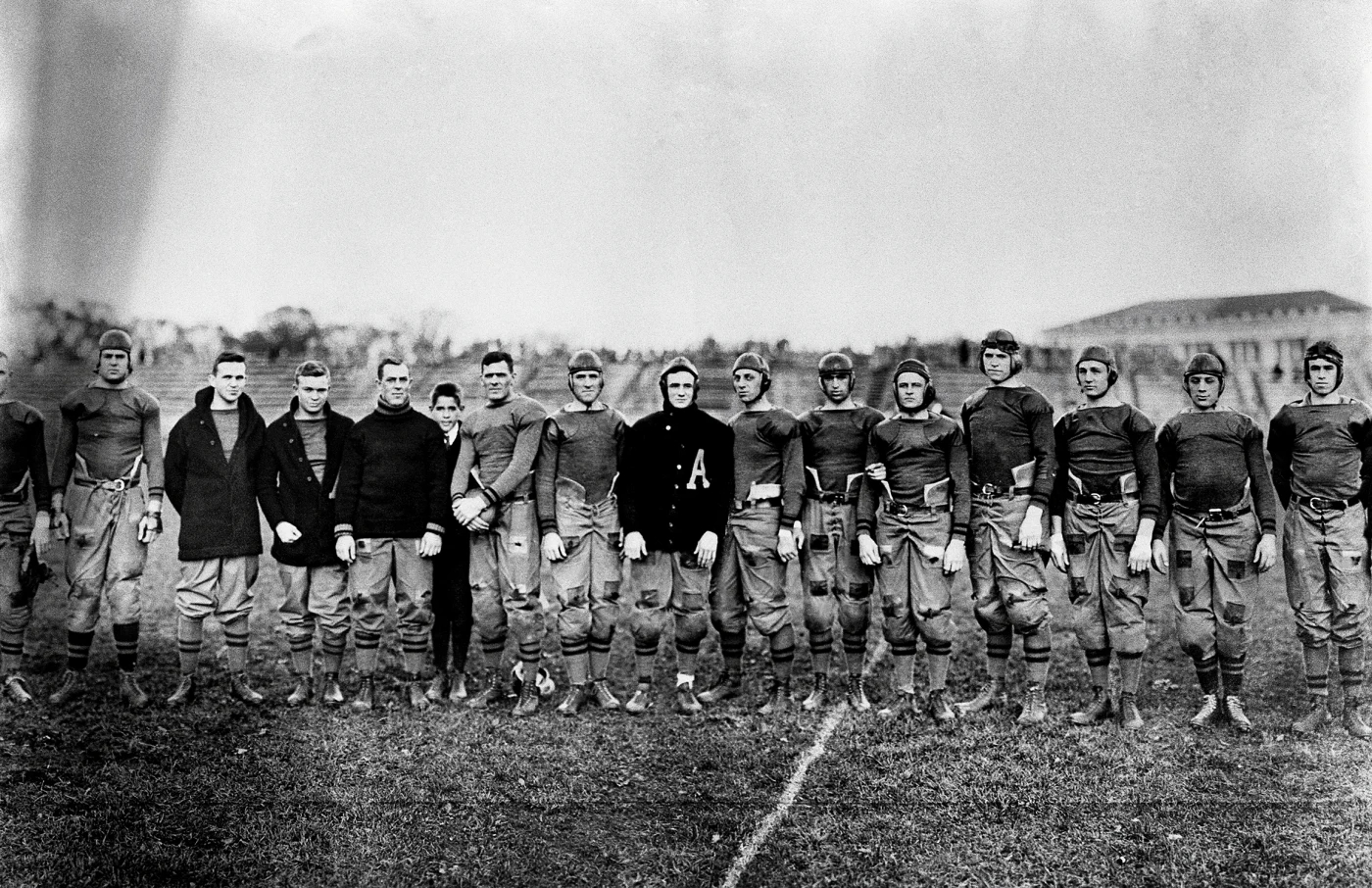
Part of the 1912 West Point football team. Cadet Eisenhower 3rd (whole person) from left; Cadet Omar Bradley 2nd from right

While at the academy, Eisenhower played college football for West Point. This would not be an issue except that in order to play college football, one must have never played a sport for money, because doing so causes forfeiture of an athlete's amateur status. If Eisenhower did in fact play baseball for money, it would have been in violation of the Cadet Honor Code. One source contends that Eisenhower even signed a voucher claiming that he had never played sports for money.

== Cadet Honor Code ==
The Cadet Honor Code, formalized in the 1920s, states simply that:

A Cadet will not lie, cheat, steal, or tolerate those who do.

Though Eisenhower graduated in 1915, before the formalization of the Honor Code, playing amateur football while having formerly been a professional athlete would constitute either lying, cheating, or both. In the early, informal, sometimes characterized as vigilante justice, phase of the Honor System, it is unclear if Eisenhower would have graduated to become an officer in the United States Army had he been found to have played for pay.

== Eisenhower's love for baseball ==
Eisenhower long had aspirations of being a professional baseball player. He is quoted as saying:

When I was a small boy in Kansas, a friend of mine and I went fishing and as we sat there in the warmth of the summer afternoon on a river bank, we talked about what we wanted to do when we grew up. I told him that I wanted to be a real major league baseball player, a genuine professional like Honus Wagner. My friend said that he'd like to be President of the United States. Neither of us got our wish.

At West Point, Eisenhower tried out for the baseball team but did not make it. He would later be quoted as saying, "Not making the baseball team at West Point was one of the greatest disappointments of my life, maybe my greatest."

== Evidence ==
The evidence that exists on the subject of Eisenhower's playing semi-pro baseball consists of quotes and later statements which can be contradictory. In June 1945 during his homecoming trip to the United States at the end of World War II in Europe, General Eisenhower attended a New York Giants game in New York City. According to articles in The New York Times (June 20, 1945) and Life (July 2, 1945), he acknowledged in a meeting with the two teams' managers that he had briefly played semi-pro ball in Kansas. He was again quoted as referring to this incident during his visit to Abilene, Kansas, a few days later (The New York Times, June 23, 1945; The Wichita Eagle, June 23, 1945). The Times quoted him as saying:

I was a center fielder. I went into baseball deliberately to make money, and with no idea of making it a career. I wanted to go to college that fall, and we didn't have money. But I wasn't a very good center fielder, and didn't do too well at it.

The Eisenhower Foundation biography includes that "he may or may have not played semi-professional baseball" upon a summer return to Abilene after his sophomore term in 1913.

Eisenhower never made it clear what years he played ball and for what teams. His naval aide's wartime diary, My Three Years with Eisenhower: The Personal Diary of Captain Harry C. Butcher, USNR (Simon & Schuster, 1946), mentions that during the war General Eisenhower told his staff and colleagues stories about playing semi-pro baseball.

Eisenhower's early biographer, Kenneth S. Davis (Soldier of Democracy, Doubleday, 1945), relates that it was common for temporary "town teams" to be organized to play teams from other towns and that players would split up the gate money at the end of the game. Quite often this would amount to only a few dollars per player.

Charlie Wheatley claimed that he played professional baseball with Eisenhower with the Abilene Reds of the Class D Central Kansas League in 1910. Mel Ott was quoted as saying that "The General admitted that as a youth he had done so (played semi-pro ball), under the assumed name of Wilson." An outfield player by the name "Wilson" is listed among the 1911 roster of the Junction City Soldiers minor league team of Junction City, Kansas. He was said to have played in 9 games with 31 at bats and 11 hits for a batting average of .355. He also had 10 putouts in 10 chances for a perfect 1.000 fielding percentage.
