= Clyde Short =

American politician

Clyde Lorraine Short

Chairman of the Kansas State Democratic Party
- In office 1934–1936
- Governor: Alf Landon
- Preceded by: Guy T. Helvering

Personal details
- Born: January 30, 1883 Rochester, Indiana, U.S.
- Died: February 27, 1936 (aged 53) Concordia, Kansas, U.S.
- Cause of death: Pneumonia
- Party: Kansas Democratic Party
- Occupation: Attorney

Clyde Lorraine Short (January 30, 1883 – February 27, 1936) was a Democratic politician from the U.S. state of Kansas, best known as a former two-time candidate for the U.S. House of Representatives and the Chairman of the Kansas Democratic Party from 1934 to 1936.

== Biography ==
Short was born in Rochester, Indiana in 1883. He grew up in Concordia, Kansas, where, as a youth, he became known for his public speaking skill. Upon graduation, he read law in the offices of Pulsiver and Alexander, passed the bar in 1916, and was eventually elected Concordia City Attorney. He was a Democratic candidate for the U. S. House of Representatives for Kansas, in 1930, against incumbent James G. Strong, who narrowly defeated Short in a close race. He ran again in 1932, and was defeated in the Democratic primary by Kathryn O'Loughlin McCarthy, who would go on to become the first female U. S. Representative from Kansas. Despite these setbacks, he remained active in the Democratic party, and was elected Party Chairman in 1934, directing the effort to unseat incumbent Governor Alf Landon. Although Landon won re-election, Short presided over two first-time Democratic victories in Kansas, the offices of State Auditor and State Superintendent of Public Instruction.

Short died in 1936, of pneumonia. His brother was American baseball player Harry Short.
