= Fred Blanding =

American baseball player (1888-1950)

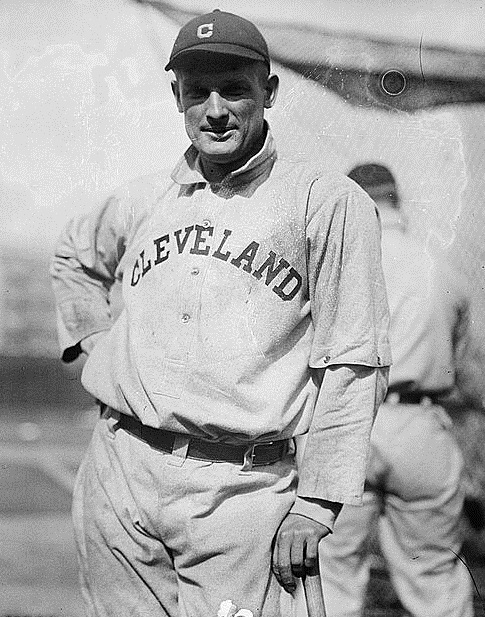
- Fred Blanding in Cleveland, ca. 1912
- Pitcher
- Born: February 8, 1888; Redlands, California, U.S.
- Died: July 16, 1950 (aged 62); Salem, Virginia, U.S.
- Batted: Right Threw: Right

MLB debut
- September 15, 1910, for the Cleveland Naps

Last MLB appearance
- September 30, 1914, for the Cleveland Naps

MLB statistics
- Win–loss record: 46–46
- Earned run average: 3.13
- Strikeouts: 278
- Stats at Baseball Reference

Teams
- Cleveland Naps (1910–1914)

Frederick James Blanding (February 8, 1888 – July 16, 1950), nicknamed "Fritz," was an American baseball player. He played five seasons as a right-handed pitcher in Major League Baseball for the Cleveland Naps from 1910 to 1914. He pitched a six-hit shutout against Walter Johnson in his Major League debut in September 1910. His best seasons were 1912 and 1913, during which time he compiled a record of 33–24. His career record with Cleveland was 46-46.

Before playing for Cleveland, Blanding was the ace on a pitching staff that led the 1909 Michigan Wolverines baseball team to an 18-3-1 record. Blanding also played amateur baseball for the Detroit Athletic Club and won 20 games for the San Antonio Bronchos of the Texas League in 1910.

In 1914, Blanding was placed into the middle of a baseball war between the established leagues and the outlaw Federal League. After signing a three-year contract with the Kansas City Packers of the Federal League, Blanding opted to return to the American League after Cleveland offered to pay him a salary reported to be in excess of $10,000. Blanding was sued by the Kansas City team, and the Cleveland team argued that Blanding remained bound to play for them under the reserve clause in his 1913 contract. Blanding was allowed to play for Cleveland in 1914, which proved to be his last season in professional baseball.

After retiring from baseball, Blanding operated an early Ford Motor Company dealership and service center in Lansing, Michigan. He later operated an automobile business in Roanoke, Virginia, during the 1930s and 1940s.

== Early years ==
Blanding was born in Redlands, California, in 1888. His father, Fred J. Blanding, Sr., died while Blanding was a child. Blanding moved to Michigan with his mother, who was a Michigan native. At the time of the 1900 United States Census, Blanding was 12 years old and living on a farm in Bloomfield Township, Oakland County, Michigan, with his mother Emma Blanding, grandparents George W. and Jane (Clendenning) Sly, and sister Charlotte. His mother was listed in the 1900 Census as a widow. Blanding attended Detroit Central High School where he played baseball.

== Amateur baseball ==
After graduating from high school, Blanding enrolled at the University of Michigan as an engineering student. He attended the university from 1907 to 1909. During the spring of 1909, he played college baseball as a pitcher for the Michigan Wolverines baseball team. Blanding was the ace on a pitching staff that led the 1909 Wolverines to an 18-3-1 record. Blanding struck out 64 batters in 13 games for Michigan.

After graduating from Michigan, Blanding played amateur baseball for the Detroit Athletic Club team during the last half of the 1909 season. A newspaper article in September 1909 noted: "Fred Blanding, the human catapult from the University of Michigan, was on the firing line for the DAC. To most clubs, Fred's very name breathes terror."

== Professional baseball ==
=== Minor leagues ===
Although Blanding was officially an amateur for the Michigan Wolverines and D.A.C. in 1909, he confessed in March 1911 that he had also played professional baseball that summer in the Central Kansas League under an assumed name, though he refused to disclose the identify of the club. According to Baseball-Reference.com, Blanding played for the Ellsworth Worthies in the Central Kansas League.

Blanding began the 1910 baseball season with a team in Aberdeen, but the franchise folded. Blanding next joined the San Antonio Bronchos in the Texas League. Blanding appeared in 30 games for San Antionio and compiled a record of 20 wins and 9 losses while pitching 230 innings.

=== Cleveland Naps ===
After his strong showing in the Texas League, Blanding was drafted by the Cleveland Naps and joined the team late in the 1910 season. On September 15, 1910, Blanding appeared in his first game in Major League Baseball. With Walter Johnson as the opposing pitcher, Blanding threw a six-hit shutout and led the Indians to a 3–0 victory. Four days later, Blanding secured his second victory against the Philadelphia Athletics and surviving a Philadelphia rally in the ninth inning: "This made Blanding's second start in the big show ... The big fellow needed all his nerve in the ninth, when a double and a single after one man had died gave the foe a run ..." In October 1910, Blanding also won the tying game in the post-season series between Cleveland and the Cincinnati Reds.

In 1911, Blanding spent the season with Cleveland and compiled a 7–11 record in 29 games. In July 1922, Blanding was praised in the press for his "manly qualities in makeup" after he asked the Cleveland team president Somers to allow him to return to the minor leagues. Blanding told Somers that "he felt that he was not giving value received for his salary and that in justice to the team he thought he had better go back to a minor league." Somers declined the offer, told Blanding to put the defeats behind him and expressed confidence that Blanding would "shake off his hoo-doo."

In 1912, he posted a record of 18–14 with 23 complete games in 262 innings pitched. His earned run average in 1912 was 2.92 — well below the league average of 3.44. His Adjusted ERA+ was 118.

Blanding had another strong season in 1913, going 15–10 with an ERA of 2.55 and an Adjusted ERA+ of 118. He opened the 1913 season with a 12–4 record. After Blanding pitched a complete-game shutout against the Detroit Tigers in April 1913, E. A. Batchelor wrote in the Detroit Free Press that Blanding was "not so brilliant in his display of speed and curves," but "he had one of those dinky curves," that, with control, was enough to beat the Tigers. At the end of the 1913 season, Sporting Life editor Ed Bang wrote of Blanding: "Fritz has always proved himself a willing worker and game to the core."

=== Federal League ===
In January 1914, Blanding signed with the Kansas City Packers of the inaugural season of play in the new Federal League. The Packers were co-owned by Charles A. Baird, who had been the athletic director at the University of Michigan while Blanding was a student. However, one week after signing with the Packers, Blanding opted to return to Cleveland after the Naps offered a higher salary. The Sporting Life reported in March 1914 that Cleveland had agreed to pay Blanding more than $10,000 for the 1914 season.

As the American and National Leagues fought to prevent the new league from signing or retaining established stars, officials of the Federal League, referred to as "the outlaw organization," threatened a "baseball war." In March 1914, after learning that Blanding had returned to Cleveland, the president of the Federal League sent an ultimatum to the American and National Leagues "to keep their hands off players already under contract to Federal league clubs." In April 1914, Blanding became a poster child for the developing baseball war as the Kansas City team filed a lawsuit seeking $10,000 and an injunction prohibiting Blanding from playing for Cleveland or any club other than Kansas City. The Kansas City team alleged that Blanding had signed a three-year contract at an annual salary of $5,833 and that Blanding had been paid a $2,500 advance. According to the suit, Blanding "jumped" his contract to return to Cleveland. Attorneys for the Cleveland baseball team appeared at the injunction hearing and sought to justify their claim over Blanding "by the plea that the reserve clause in his 1913 contract with the Naps held him legally to that club and maintained that he had no right to sign the Kansas City contract."

=== 1914 season ===
Blanding returned to Cleveland for the 1914 season. Although the team included Nap Lajoie and Shoeless Joe Jackson, manager Joe Birmingham was in a feud with Lajoie and the 1914 Naps finished with the worst record in franchise history, 51 wins and 102 losses for a .333 winning percentage. Blanding was used principally as a reliever in 1914 and compiled a record of 4–9. According to one press report, some of the blame for Blanding's 1914 performance lay with the manager:

According to Frederick [Blanding], Birmingham used him badly last season. When Fred was ready and anxious to pitch and warmed up with enough speed to throw the ball through a brick wall, Birmingham wouldn't let him work. Other days when he didn't even have a glove and had to borrow one, Joe sent him to the mound and let him stay there until the humane society got an injunction.

Although Blanding had previously been a supporter of Birmingham, Blanding wrote in December 1914 that he would not return to Cleveland in 1915 if Birmingham remained the manager. The Detroit Free Press reported:

The blond flinger ... does not threaten to leap to the Federals nor does he demand more salary. He just says that he and Birmingham can't get along, and that one of them will cease to be a Nap. As he has no authority to oust the manager, he solves the perplexing problem by quitting himself.

=== Retirement from baseball ===
In February 1915, Blanding announced that he would not report for spring training. He said that he was quitting baseball because of "excessive weight." He stated that he intended to remain at his farm in Birmingham, Michigan. Blanding noted that he believed he could "make just as much money and have a heap more of fun" devoting himself to agricultural pursuits on his farm.

In five seasons with Cleveland, Blanding compiled a career record of 46–46 with a 3.13 ERA in 144 games, including 86 as a starter. He also compiled a respectable .258 batting average with one home run and 24 RBIs.

During the summer of 1915, Blanding did return to baseball as a player for Detroit's Palestine Lodge team in the Masonic League. In a game against the Cleveland Masonic League champions on October 22, 1915, Blanding allowed only five hits against the Halcyon Lodge. The Detroit Free Press wrote that "Blanding was in splendid form, allowing five hits and fanning nine men."

== Family and automotive business ==
On 28 November 1914 in Cuyahoga County, Ohio, Blanding married Clara M. Shields of Cleveland.

After retiring from baseball, Blanding owned and operated the Ford Motor Company agency, sales office, and service facility for Lansing, Michigan, and adjacent territory. The business was originally a partnership with J. C. Clarkson, but Blanding purchased Clarkson's interest in the business in 1917. According to Rich Adler's history of baseball at the University of Michigan, Blanding's operation was one of the early Ford dealerships. In 1920, Blanding announced that, due to growth in the business, he would build a new facility at Lansing that would include a large garage and show room in a building with three stories and 5,400 square feet of floor space.

In the early 1920s, Blanding also served as the president of the Lansing Senators, a baseball team that played in the Central League in 1921 and 1922. In May 1921, The Sporting News reported that Blanding "has announced on various and sundry occasions he intends leaving his auto sales-rooms and going out to the lot, where he is going to take off his coat and put the young pitchers of the Lansing team through a course of sprouts."

At the time of the 1920 and 1930 United States Censuses, Blanding was living in Lansing, Michigan, with his wife Clara, three children (George, Robert and Katherine) and a live-in maid or servant. His occupation was listed in 1920 as the manager of a garage and in 1930 as the president of a Ford and Lincoln distributorship.

In 1935, Blanding entered the automobile business in Roanoke, Virginia. He continued in that business for 15 years with the exception of a period during World War II when he worked at the Radford Arsenal. In a draft registration card completed in April 1942, Blanding noted that he was living in Roanoke and employed by the Hercules Powder Co. in Radford, Virginia.

In July 1950, Blanding died at age 62 from a heart attack at his home in Salem, Virginia. Blanding was survived by his wife and three children. He was buried at the Franklin Cemetery in Franklin, Michigan.
