= James G. Strong =

American politician

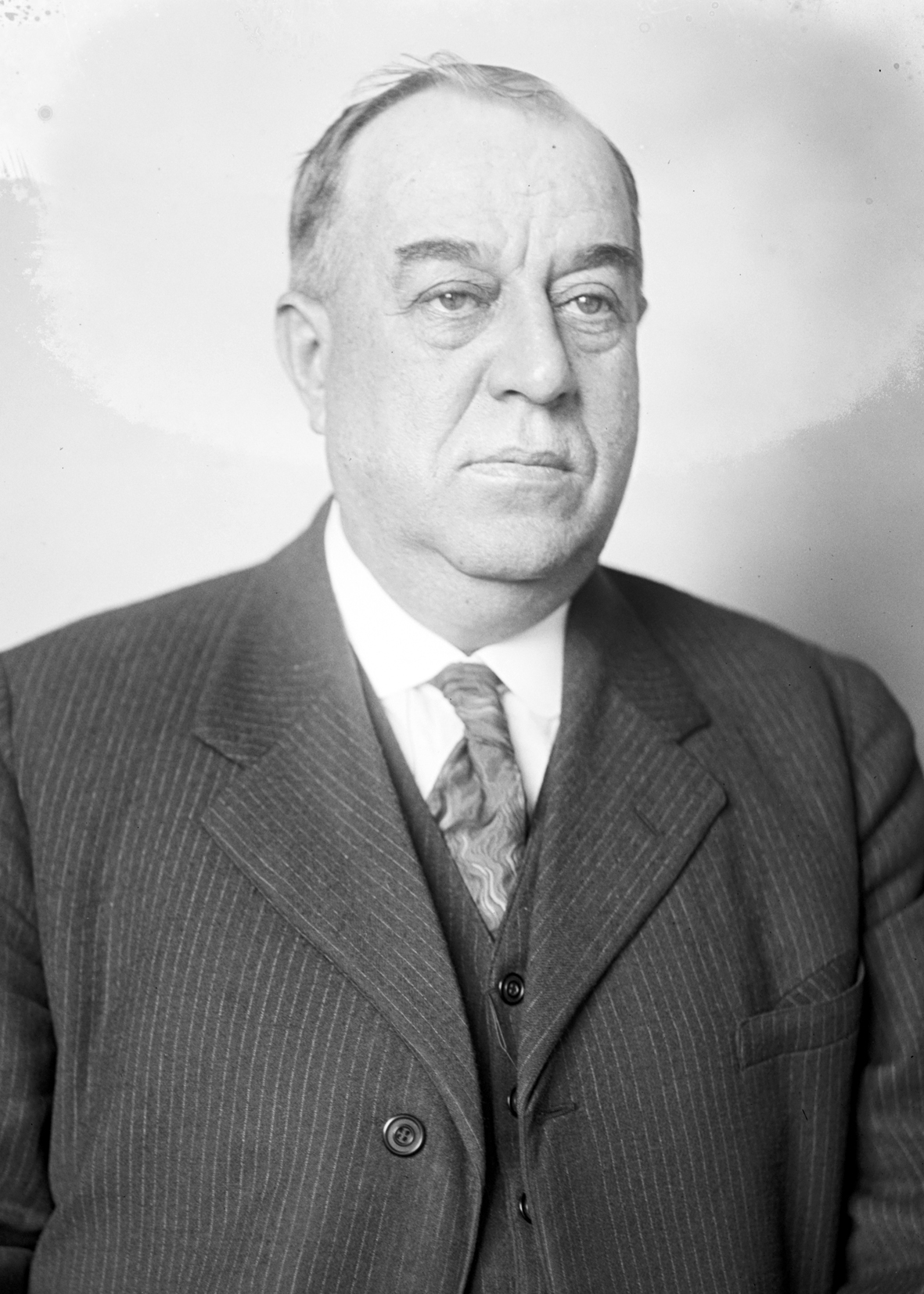

Member of the U.S. House of Representatives from Kansas's 5th district
- In office March 4, 1919 – March 3, 1933
- Preceded by: Guy T. Helvering
- Succeeded by: William Augustus Ayres

Personal details
- Born: April 23, 1870 Dwight, Illinois, U.S.
- Died: January 11, 1938 (aged 67) Washington, D.C., U.S.
- Party: Republican

James George Strong (April 23, 1870 – January 11, 1938) was a U.S. representative from Kansas.

Born in Dwight, Illinois, Strong attended the public schools of Dwight, Illinois, from 1876 to 1879, the Episcopal Mission of Greenwood Agency, S.Dak. from 1879 to 1880, the public school at St. Marys, Kansas from 1882 to 1887, and Baker University, Baldwin, Kansas from 1887 to 1889. He moved to Blue Rapids, Kansas, in 1891. He engaged in the real estate, loan, and insurance businesses. He also studied law. He was admitted to the bar in 1895 and commenced practice in Blue Rapids. He was also interested in mercantile and agricultural pursuits. City attorney 1896–1911. Organized the Blue Rapids Telephone Co. in 1905. He served as assistant attorney general of Marshall County in 1911 and 1912. He served as delegate to the Republican National Conventions in 1912 and 1928. Organized and developed the Marshall County Power &amp. Light Co. in 1912. He served as member of the school board 1913–1916. He served as prosecuting attorney of Marshall County in 1916 and 1917.

Strong was elected as a Republican to the Sixty-sixth and to the six succeeding Congresses (March 4, 1919 – March 3, 1933), narrowly defeating Clyde Short in 1930. He served as chairman of the Committee on War Claims (Sixty-eighth through Seventy-first Congresses). He was an unsuccessful for renomination in 1932. He was appointed first assistant treasurer of the Home Owners' Loan Corporation in 1933 and served until his death in Washington, D.C., on January 11, 1938. He was interred in Fairmount Cemetery, Blue Rapids, Kansas.

U.S. House of Representatives
Preceded by Guy T. Helvering	Member of the U.S. House of Representatives from Kansas's 5th congressional district 1919 – 1933	Succeeded by William A. Ayres
