= Gil Britton =

American baseball player (1891–1983)

- Shortstop
- Born: September 21, 1891; Parsons, Kansas, U.S.
- Died: June 20, 1983 (aged 91); Parsons, Kansas, U.S.
- Batted: Right Threw: Right

MLB debut
- September 20, 1913, for the Pittsburgh Pirates

Last MLB appearance
- September 23, 1913, for the Pittsburgh Pirates

MLB statistics
- Games played: 3
- At bats: 12
- Hits: 0
- Stats at Baseball Reference

Teams
- Pittsburgh Pirates (1913)

Stephen Gilbert Britton (September 21, 1891 – June 20, 1983) was an American shortstop in Major League Baseball who played in three games for the Pittsburgh Pirates in 1913. He played minor league baseball for the Clay Center Cubs of the Central Kansas League.
