= Chapman's Dugout =

In the early 1860s Stephen B. Chapman and his family lived on a farm near the town of Black Jack, south of Lawrence, Kansas. In summer 1863 Bushwhackers began traveling through the area, terrorizing the citizens. After William C. Quantrill's Lawrence Massacre on August 21, 1863, the family in September moved west, since the guerrillas passed within sight of their farm.

They arrived in Ottawa County, Kansas, in October, settling on the Solomon River. They and some of their new neighbors built them a dugout, a single room measuring fourteen by sixteen feet. The dugout had a fireplace and probably logs and/or sod were used for the roof and some of the walls. After the structure was completed, the family moved into it and Mr. Chapman built a rough wood floor for it.

Very quickly the Chapman home started to serve the growing numbers of settlers as a fort during Indian disturbances. During this time relations between the settlers and the Indians were hostile and many Indian raids transpired. Sometimes large numbers of settlers took refuge in the Chapman dugout. The largest number was fifty-two men, women and children. In the nights of refuge, the men would keep watch for Indians and the women and children would sleep on quilts on the floor.

One time the Indians set a grass fire in an apparent attempt to burn out the white settlers. The native prairie grass was six feet high and burned well in the wind that accompanied the fire. The result was many buffalo died in the fire.

When the Chapman dugout was used as the area fortress, it served as the community Sunday school. About ten persons met there every Sunday.

The dugout's use as a refuge pretty much ended by summer 1864. At that time Fort Solomon was built about a mile to the north. The town of Lindsey developed around Fort Solomon. The majority of the county's population lived in log cabins inside Fort Solomon from summer 1864 to spring 1865.

Even the Chapmans had a cabin inside the fort, but apparently they never took refuge in it. They preferred to remain in their dugout. Capt. Elisha Hammer took a troop detachment from Salina to visit Ottawa County and begged the Chapmans to leave their dugout. They still stayed, enduring near starvation.

Eventually the raids ceased. In 1868 or 1869 the Chapmans completed a brick house and left their dugout, which fell into disrepair.
