= North Ottawa County USD 239 =

Public school district in Minneapolis, Kansas

Address
- 716 E. 7th St. Minneapolis, Kansas, 67467; United States
- Coordinates: 39°7′39″N 97°41′55″W

District information
- Type: Public
- Grades: K to 12
- Schools: 2

Other information
- Website: usd239.org

North Ottawa County USD 239 is a public unified school district headquartered in Minneapolis, Kansas, United States. The district includes the communities of Minneapolis, Delphos, Ada, Lindsey, Sumnerville, Wells, and nearby rural areas.

== Schools ==
The school district operates the following schools:

- Minneapolis High School
- Minneapolis Elementary School

== See also ==
- Kansas State Department of Education
- Kansas State High School Activities Association
- List of high schools in Kansas
- List of unified school districts in Kansas
