= Fort Solomon =

In early 1864 settlers in Ottawa County, Kansas, began building Fort Solomon and completed it by the spring or summer. This structure replaced the much smaller dugout owned by the Chapman family and used as a refuge in times of trouble (see Chapman's Dugout). The Chapman dugout was about a mile south of Fort Solomon. The new white settlers and the Indians in the area quickly developed a hostile relationship and many Indian raids followed.

Fort Solomon was built on the east side of a reverse S-shaped bend on the Solomon River. It was built on level ground and the west side was bordered by a deeply cut bank along the river. The view in all directions from the fort was good. Once completed in spring or summer 1864, the fort contained about twenty log houses arranged in a square and enclosed by a log stockade. About fourteen families lived inside the fort.

Accounts from those present at the completed fort all vary, so it is not possible to determine the exact layout of Fort Solomon. A store may have operated from one of the log cabins. The fort contained a well and a schoolhouse, although there is disagreement as to the school's location. The fort had at least three gated entrances.

A dugout was within the walls of the fort. It was well protected, being five feet deep and built of heavy timbers. The structure's walls and roof were covered with two or three feet of earth. It may have had gun ports. While the fort was being constructed, the Solomon Valley Militia was organized, attracting about thirty men. They were armed with aging guns and a small cannon, probably a mountain howitzer. All or most of the weapons came from Fort Riley.

From summer 1864 to spring 1865 most of the area's settlers lived inside the fort. The town of Lindsey, Kansas, grew just outside Fort Solomon, taking advantage of the protection provided by it. For a time Lindsey was the county seat of Ottawa County. By the late 1860s the Indian raids ceased and Fort Solomon was abandoned. Eventually the structures of the fort collapsed from lack of maintenance.
