= George Aiton =

American baseball player (1890-1976)

- Outfielder
- Born: December 29, 1890; Kingman, Kansas
- Died: August 16, 1976 (aged 85); North Hollywood, California
- Batted: Both Threw: Right

MLB debut
- June 29, 1912, for the St. Louis Browns

Last MLB appearance
- July 28, 1902, for the St. Louis Browns

MLB statistics
- Games played: 10
- At bats: 21
- Hits: 4
- Stats at Baseball Reference

Teams
- St. Louis Browns (1912)

George Wilson Aiton (December 29, 1890 – August 16, 1976) was a Major League Baseball player. Aiton played for the St. Louis Browns in the 1912 season. He only played in ten games for the Browns, having four hits in seventeen at-bats. He played minor league baseball for the Clay Center Cubs of the Central Kansas League

Aiton was born in Kingman, Kansas and died in North Hollywood, California.
