= Concordia Travelers =

- 1910–1911; Concordia, Kansas

Minor league affiliations
- Previous classes: Class D
- League: Central Kansas League

Minor league titles
- League titles (2): 1910; 1911

The Concordia Travelers were an American minor league baseball team. The club was founded in 1910 in the Central Kansas League and was managed by player-manager Harry Short. The Travelers also featured notable players Chick Smith, Harry Chapman, and John Misse.

The team won their league championships in 1910 and 1911.
