= John Misse =

American baseball player (1885-1970)

- Second baseman/Shortstop
- Born: May 30, 1885; Highland, Kansas
- Died: March 18, 1970 (aged 84); St. Joseph, Missouri
- Batted: Right Threw: Right

Central Kansas League debut
- May 26, 1910, for the Concordia Travelers

Last MLB appearance
- October 8, 1914, for the St. Louis Terriers

MLB statistics
- Batting average: .196
- Home runs: 0
- Runs batted in: 22
- Stats at Baseball Reference

Teams
- St. Louis Terriers (1914)

John Beverly Misse (May 30, 1885 – March 18, 1970) was a Major League Baseball second baseman and shortstop who played for the St. Louis Terriers of the Federal League in 1914. Previously, he played Minor league baseball with the Concordia Travelers as early as 1910.
