= Hi Ebright =

American baseball player (1859–1916)

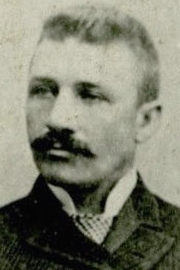
- Utility player
- Born: June 12, 1859; Lancaster County, Pennsylvania, U.S.
- Died: October 24, 1916 (aged 57); Milwaukee, Wisconsin, U.S.
- Batted: Right Threw: Right

MLB debut
- April 24, 1889, for the Washington Nationals

Last MLB appearance
- June 11, 1889, for the Washington Nationals

MLB statistics
- Batting average: .254
- Home runs: 1
- Runs batted in: 6
- Stats at Baseball Reference

Teams
- Washington Nationals (1889)

Hiram C. Ebright (June 12, 1859 – October 24, 1916) was an American baseball player. He played in 16 games for the 1889 Washington Nationals of the National League, hitting .254 in 59 at-bats. He played catcher, outfield and shortstop. He also played minor league baseball in the California League from 1888 to 1893 and the Western Association from 1894 to 1898. He finished his career with the Sioux City Cornhuskers of the Western League in 1900. He was a player/manager from 1894 to 1897 in minor league baseball as well.
