= Chick Smith =

American baseball player (1892–1935)

- Pitcher
- Born: December 2, 1892; Dayton, Kentucky
- Died: October 11, 1935 (aged 42); Dayton, Kentucky
- Batted: Left Threw: Left

MLB debut
- April 12, 1913, for the Cincinnati Reds

Last MLB appearance
- May 21, 1913, for the Cincinnati Reds

MLB statistics
- Win–loss record: 0-1
- Earned run average: 3.57
- Strikeouts: 11
- Stats at Baseball Reference

Teams
- Cincinnati Reds (1913)

John William "Chick" Smith (December 2, 1892 – October 11, 1935) was a pitcher in Minor and Major League Baseball. He played for the Cincinnati Reds in 1913. In 1910 and 1911, he played minor league baseball with the Concordia Travelers coached by Harry Short.
