= Minneapolis, Kansas =

City in Ottawa County, Kansas

- City and County seat
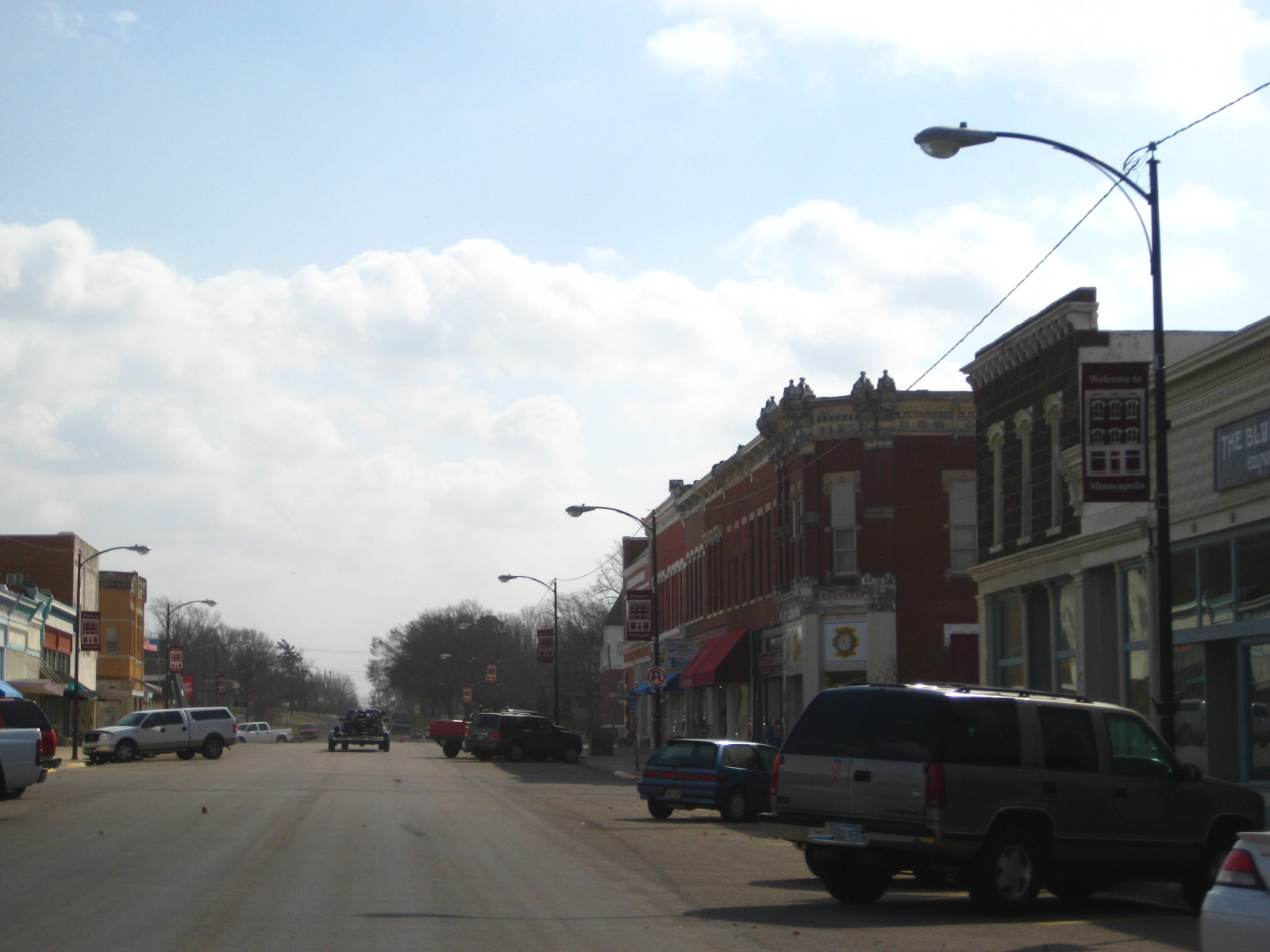
- Business District (2009)

- Location within Ottawa County and Kansas

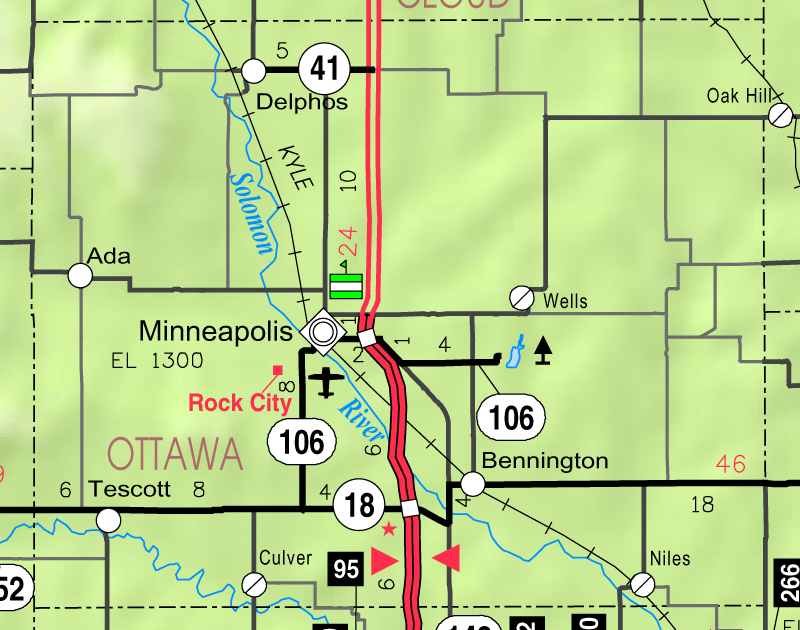
- KDOT map of Ottawa County (legend)
- Coordinates: 39°07′29″N 97°41′55″W
- Country: United States
- State: Kansas
- County: Ottawa
- Founded: 1860s
- Platted: 1866
- Incorporated: 1871
- Named for: Minneapolis, Minnesota

Area
  - Total: 1.83 sq mi (4.75 km^{2})
  - Land: 1.83 sq mi (4.75 km^{2})
  - Water: 0 sq mi (0.00 km^{2})
- Elevation: 1,276 ft (389 m)

Population (2020)
  - Total: 1,946
  - Density: 1,060/sq mi (410/km^{2})
- Time zone: UTC-6 (CST)
  - Summer (DST): UTC-5 (CDT)
- ZIP Code: 67467
- Area code: 785
- FIPS code: 20-47075
- GNIS ID: 485622
- Website: minneapolis-ks.com

Minneapolis is a city in and the county seat of Ottawa County, United States. As of the 2020 census, the population of the city was 1,946.

== History ==
The community was originally called Markley's Mills, and under the latter name was laid out in 1866. It was renamed Minneapolis about 1871, after Minneapolis, Minnesota. The railroad was built through Minneapolis in 1878.

Minneapolis had its own minor league baseball team called the Minnies in 1905, then from 1908 to 1909, and again in 1912, alternately as part of the Kansas State League or Central Kansas League.

== Geography ==
According to the United States Census Bureau, the city has a total area of 1.76 square miles (4.56 km^{2}), all land.

=== Climate ===
Climate data for Minneapolis, Kansas (1991–2020 normals, extremes 1892–present)
Month	Jan	Feb	Mar	Apr	May	Jun	Jul	Aug	Sep	Oct	Nov	Dec	Year
Record high °F (°C)	80 (27)	87 (31)	95 (35)	101 (38)	104 (40)	113 (45)	117 (47)	119 (48)	115 (46)	102 (39)	87 (31)	82 (28)	119 (48)
Mean maximum °F (°C)	64.5 (18.1)	71.1 (21.7)	80.8 (27.1)	87.8 (31.0)	92.8 (33.8)	99.3 (37.4)	104.9 (40.5)	102.9 (39.4)	97.5 (36.4)	89.6 (32.0)	75.6 (24.2)	64.4 (18.0)	105.9 (41.1)
Mean daily maximum °F (°C)	40.4 (4.7)	45.8 (7.7)	57.0 (13.9)	67.1 (19.5)	76.7 (24.8)	87.7 (30.9)	93.3 (34.1)	90.6 (32.6)	82.6 (28.1)	69.6 (20.9)	55.0 (12.8)	42.6 (5.9)	67.4 (19.7)
Daily mean °F (°C)	29.3 (−1.5)	33.5 (0.8)	43.8 (6.6)	53.9 (12.2)	64.7 (18.2)	75.4 (24.1)	80.8 (27.1)	78.1 (25.6)	69.7 (20.9)	56.5 (13.6)	42.8 (6.0)	31.9 (−0.1)	55.0 (12.8)
Mean daily minimum °F (°C)	18.2 (−7.7)	21.3 (−5.9)	30.6 (−0.8)	40.7 (4.8)	52.7 (11.5)	63.2 (17.3)	68.2 (20.1)	65.6 (18.7)	56.8 (13.8)	43.4 (6.3)	30.6 (−0.8)	21.3 (−5.9)	42.7 (5.9)
Mean minimum °F (°C)	1.0 (−17.2)	4.8 (−15.1)	13.4 (−10.3)	26.2 (−3.2)	38.3 (3.5)	51.0 (10.6)	58.0 (14.4)	56.2 (13.4)	41.8 (5.4)	27.6 (−2.4)	15.4 (−9.2)	5.2 (−14.9)	−3.3 (−19.6)
Record low °F (°C)	−22 (−30)	−29 (−34)	−13 (−25)	8 (−13)	21 (−6)	40 (4)	48 (9)	41 (5)	28 (−2)	10 (−12)	−4 (−20)	−24 (−31)	−29 (−34)
Average precipitation inches (mm)	0.86 (22)	1.16 (29)	1.92 (49)	2.42 (61)	5.17 (131)	3.98 (101)	4.40 (112)	4.20 (107)	2.69 (68)	2.39 (61)	1.24 (31)	1.29 (33)	31.72 (806)
Average snowfall inches (cm)	4.7 (12)	3.4 (8.6)	2.2 (5.6)	0.9 (2.3)	0.0 (0.0)	0.0 (0.0)	0.0 (0.0)	0.0 (0.0)	0.0 (0.0)	0.3 (0.76)	1.6 (4.1)	4.5 (11)	17.6 (45)
Average precipitation days (≥ 0.01 in)	5.3	5.8	7.7	8.9	11.3	9.3	9.8	10.0	7.3	6.9	6.0	5.6	93.9
Average snowy days (≥ 0.1 in)	3.8	2.8	1.9	0.5	0.0	0.0	0.0	0.0	0.0	0.3	1.4	3.0	13.7
Source: NOAA

== Demographics ==
Historical population
Census	Pop.	Note	%±
1880	1,084		—
1890	1,756		62.0%
1900	1,727		−1.7%
1910	1,895		9.7%
1920	1,842		−2.8%
1930	1,741		−5.5%
1940	2,087		19.9%
1950	1,801		−13.7%
1960	2,024		12.4%
1970	1,971		−2.6%
1980	2,075		5.3%
1990	1,983		−4.4%
2000	2,046		3.2%
2010	2,032		−0.7%
2020	1,946		−4.2%
U.S. Decennial Census

Minneapolis is part of the Salina Micropolitan Statistical Area.

=== 2020 census ===
As of the 2020 census, Minneapolis had a population of 1,946, with 785 households and 473 families. The population density was 1,061.6 per square mile (409.9/km^{2}). There were 905 housing units at an average density of 493.7 per square mile (190.6/km^{2}).

The median age was 42.2 years. 23.9% of residents were under the age of 18 and 22.4% were 65 years of age or older. For every 100 females, there were 95.6 males, and for every 100 females age 18 and older, there were 101.2 males. 0.0% of residents lived in urban areas, while 100.0% lived in rural areas.

Among households, 27.6% had children under the age of 18 living in them. Of all households, 49.7% were married-couple households, 19.4% were households with a male householder and no spouse or partner present, and 26.8% were households with a female householder and no spouse or partner present. About 35.7% of all households were made up of individuals and 16.3% had someone living alone who was 65 years of age or older.

Of the housing units, 13.3% were vacant. The homeowner vacancy rate was 3.5% and the rental vacancy rate was 14.9%.

Racial composition as of the 2020 census
Race	Number	Percent
White	1,795	92.2%
Black or African American	17	0.9%
American Indian and Alaska Native	5	0.3%
Asian	5	0.3%
Native Hawaiian and Other Pacific Islander	0	0.0%
Some other race	9	0.5%
Two or more races	115	5.9%
Hispanic or Latino (of any race)	57	2.9%

White residents who were not Hispanic or Latino made up 90.44% of the population.

Demographic estimates

The average household size was 2.1 and the average family size was 2.6. The percent of those with a bachelor's degree or higher was estimated to be 17.4% of the population.

Income and poverty

The 2016–2020 5-year American Community Survey estimates show that the median household income was $52,578 (with a margin of error of +/- $4,294) and the median family income was $76,719 (+/- $7,674). Males had a median income of $40,694 (+/- $8,244) versus $27,212 (+/- $7,010) for females. The median income for those above 16 years old was $33,711 (+/- $4,343). Approximately, 10.0% of families and 11.6% of the population were below the poverty line, including 12.8% of those under the age of 18 and 9.9% of those ages 65 or over.

=== 2010 census ===
As of the census of 2010, there were 2,032 people, 832 households, and 528 families living in the city. The population density was 1,154.5 inhabitants per square mile (445.8/km^{2}). There were 919 housing units at an average density of 522.2 per square mile (201.6/km^{2}). The racial makeup of the city was 96.1% White, 1.2% African American, 0.2% Native American, 0.1% Asian, 0.6% from other races, and 1.8% from two or more races. Hispanic or Latino of any race were 2.7% of the population.

There were 832 households, of which 32.1% had children under the age of 18 living with them, 48.8% were married couples living together, 10.2% had a female householder with no husband present, 4.4% had a male householder with no wife present, and 36.5% were non-families. 33.2% of all households were made up of individuals, and 16.7% had someone living alone who was 65 years of age or older. The average household size was 2.32 and the average family size was 2.94.

The median age in the city was 40 years. 26.4% of residents were under the age of 18; 5% were between the ages of 18 and 24; 23.6% were from 25 to 44; 24.3% were from 45 to 64; and 20.7% were 65 years of age or older. The gender makeup of the city was 50.4% male and 49.6% female.

== Area attractions ==
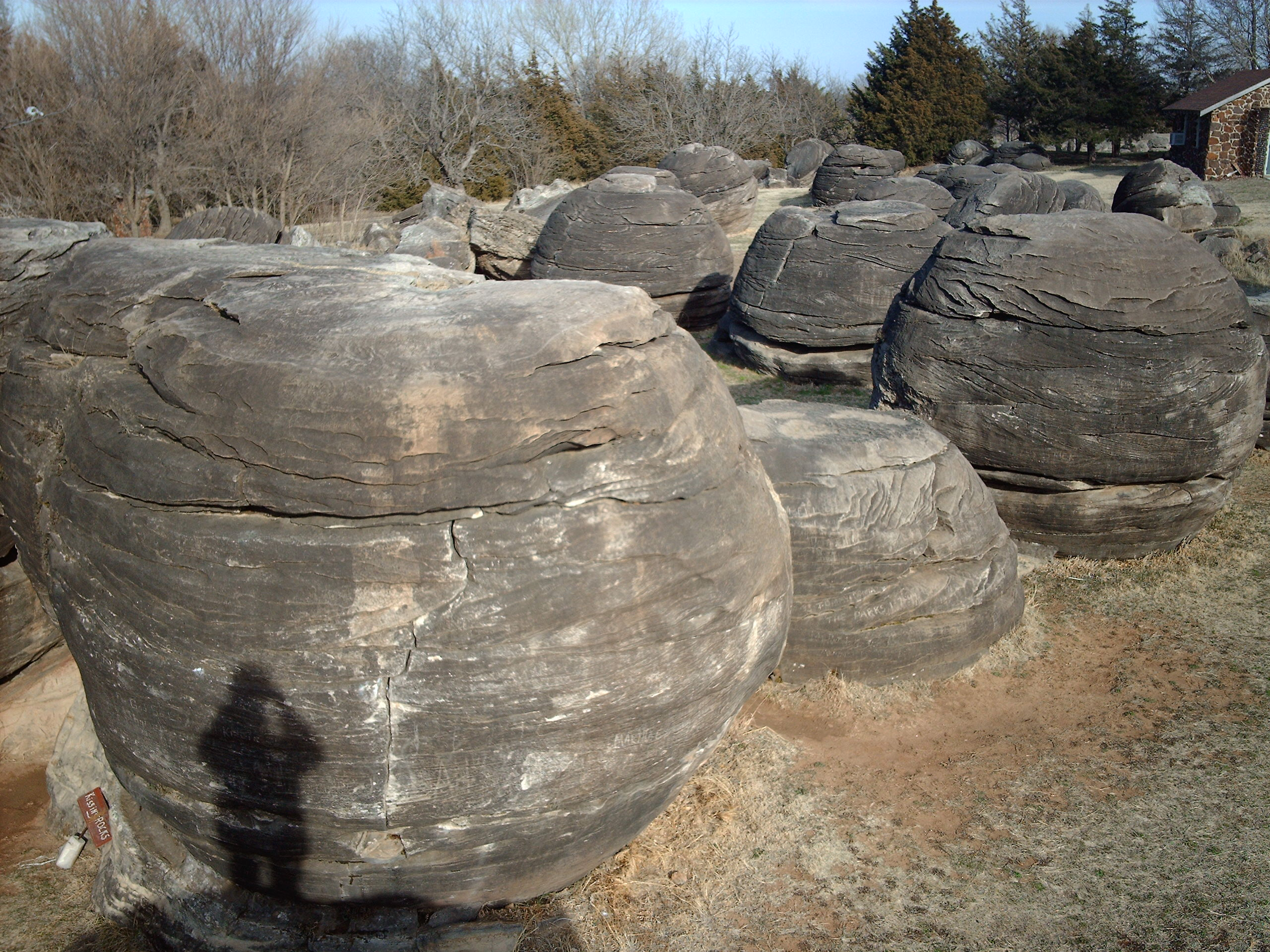
Rock City park, southwest of Minneapolis (2006)

Rock City park is located 3 miles southwest of Minneapolis.

== Education ==
The community is served by North Ottawa County USD 239 public school district.

== Notable people ==
- George Washington Carver, who lived in the vicinity for a brief period.
- Bessie S. McColgin, Oklahoma businesswoman and politician
- Rollin Rees, former U.S. Representative from Kansas
- Frank "Cannonball" Richards, vaudeville and sideshow performer known for his acts involving hits to the gut, most famously getting shot with a cannonball
- Alexander Riddle, 11th Lieutenant Governor of Kansas and publisher of the Minneapolis Messenger newspaper
