= Clay Center Cubs =

Minor league baseball team in Clay Center, Kansas

- 1909–1913; Clay Center, Kansas

Minor league affiliations
- Previous classes: Class D (1909-1911, 1913)
- League: Kansas State League (1913); Central Kansas League (1909-1911)

The Clay Center Cubs were an American minor league baseball team based in Clay Center, Kansas.

They were founded in 1909, and played two and a half seasons in the Central Kansas League, until the league folded midway through the 1911 season. The team re-formed for the 1913 season and joined the Kansas State League. They finished 1½ games out of first place but folded again after the season.

Three major league players are known to have played for Clay Center: Clyde Southwick (1910-1911), George Aiton (1911), and Gil Britton (1911). All three of them played for the 1911 team.
