= Junction City Soldiers =

- 1909–1913; Junction City, Kansas

Minor league affiliations
- Previous classes: Class D
- League: Kansas State League (1909–1912); Central Kansas League (1913)

The Junction City Soldiers were an American minor league baseball team founded in 1909 in the Central Kansas League. After the 1912 season, the Central Kansas League was renamed the Kansas State League. The team ceased operations in 1913.

Notable former players include Al Bashang and Jimmy Whelan.

There is a longstanding controversy regarding whether former US President Dwight D. Eisenhower played professional baseball for the Soldiers.

The Junction City Soldiers were preceded by the 1897 Junction City Parrots, who played as members of the Kansas State League.
