= Minneapolis Minnies (Kansas) =

- 1905–1912; (1905, 1908, 1909, 1912); Minneapolis, Kansas

Minor league affiliations
- Previous classes: Class D (1905, 1908, 1909, 1912)
- League: Kansas State League; Central Kansas League

The Minneapolis Minnies were an American minor league baseball team founded in 1905 in the Kansas State League. After the 1905 season, the team ceased operations until 1908, when they reformed and joined the Central Kansas League. The team ceased operations once again after 1909, and then returned for their final season in 1912.

Notable former players include Ross Reynolds and Harry Short.
