= San Angelo Colts (1948–1957) =

- 1922–1956; (1921-1922, 1928-1929, 1948-1956, 1958-1959); San Angelo, Texas

Minor league affiliations
- Previous classes: Class-D (1958-1961); Class-C (1951-1955)
- Previous leagues: Sophomore League (1958) southwestern League (1956); Longhorn League (1948-1955); West Texas League (1921-1922, 1928-1929)

Major league affiliations
- Previous teams: Pittsburgh Pirates (1958-1959)

Minor league titles
- League titles: 2 1928, 1955

Team data
- Previous names: San Angelo Colts (1922, 1948-1956); San Angelo Pirates (1958-1959); San Angelo Sheep Herders (1929); San Angelo Red Snappers (1928); San Angelo Bronchos (1921)

The San Angelo Colts was the primary name of the minor league baseball team based in San Angelo, Texas, United States in various seasons between 1921 and 1959.

== History ==
The 1955 Colts won the Longhorn League championship under manager Pat McLaughlin.

The 1928 Red Snappers won the West Texas League Championship, finishing 69-47 under manager Earl "Red" Snapp, the teams namesake.

Notable players and managers include McLaughlin, Sam Harshaney, Mark Christman and Hillis Layne.

The first Colts team by that name also played in the West Texas League in 1922.

The 1957 Pampa Oilers moved to San Angelo partway through the season. The 1959 San Angelo Pirates moved to Rosewell, NM on June 9, 1959.

== Notable alumni ==
- Willie Stargell (1959) Inducted Baseball Hall of Fame, 1988
- Mark Christman (1952)
- Red Snapp (1928, MGR)
