= Virgil Donald Richardson =

American baseball player (1917–2014)

Virgil Donald Richardson (December 25, 1917 – December 21, 2014) was an American minor league baseball player in the 1940s and 1950s who hit over 260 home runs in his professional career. He was born in South Bend, Nebraska.

Richardson began his career playing for the Mitchell Kernels and Salina Millers in 1939, hitting .308 in 120 games. He played for four teams in 1940 – the Worthington Cardinals, Opelousas Indians, Rayne Rice Birds and Oklahoma City Indians – and in 1941 and 1942, he was with the Topeka Owls. He reached double digit home runs the first time that year, hitting 11.

After not playing from 1943 to 1945 due to serving in the United States Navy during World War II, he resumed his professional career in 1946 and spent the majority of the remainder of his playing days in the West Texas–New Mexico League. He played for the Pampa Oilers in 1946, hitting .339 with 26 home runs, 41 doubles and a .603 slugging percentage in 136 games. In 1947, Richardson hit .323 with 33 home runs and 46 doubles in 142 games between the Lubbock Hubbers and Montgomery Rebels of the Southeastern League. He also had 113 RBI, 92 walks and only 35 strikeouts with Lubbock. Back with Lubbock in 1948, Richardson hit .397 with 38 home runs, 48 doubles, 201 hits and a .741 slugging mark and in 1949, he hit .305 with 19 home runs and 35 doubles for Pampa. He had 33 home runs and 39 doubles for Pampa in 1950, while batting .330, and in 1951, he hit .324 with 25 home runs and 46 doubles for the same club.

In 1952, he joined the Clovis Pioneers, with whom he remained until the end of his career. He had 21 home runs and 36 doubles his first year with the club, 27 home runs, 38 doubles and a .330 batting average his second campaign and in 1954, his final season, he had 12 home runs and 35 doubles.

Overall, he at least 262 home runs and 440 doubles in his 13-year career. He set numerous West Texas–New Mexico League records. He also managed Pampa for part of the 1951 campaign, replacing Grover Seitz.

Richardson died in Fairbury, Nebraska on December 21, 2014.
