= Gordon Nell =

American baseball player

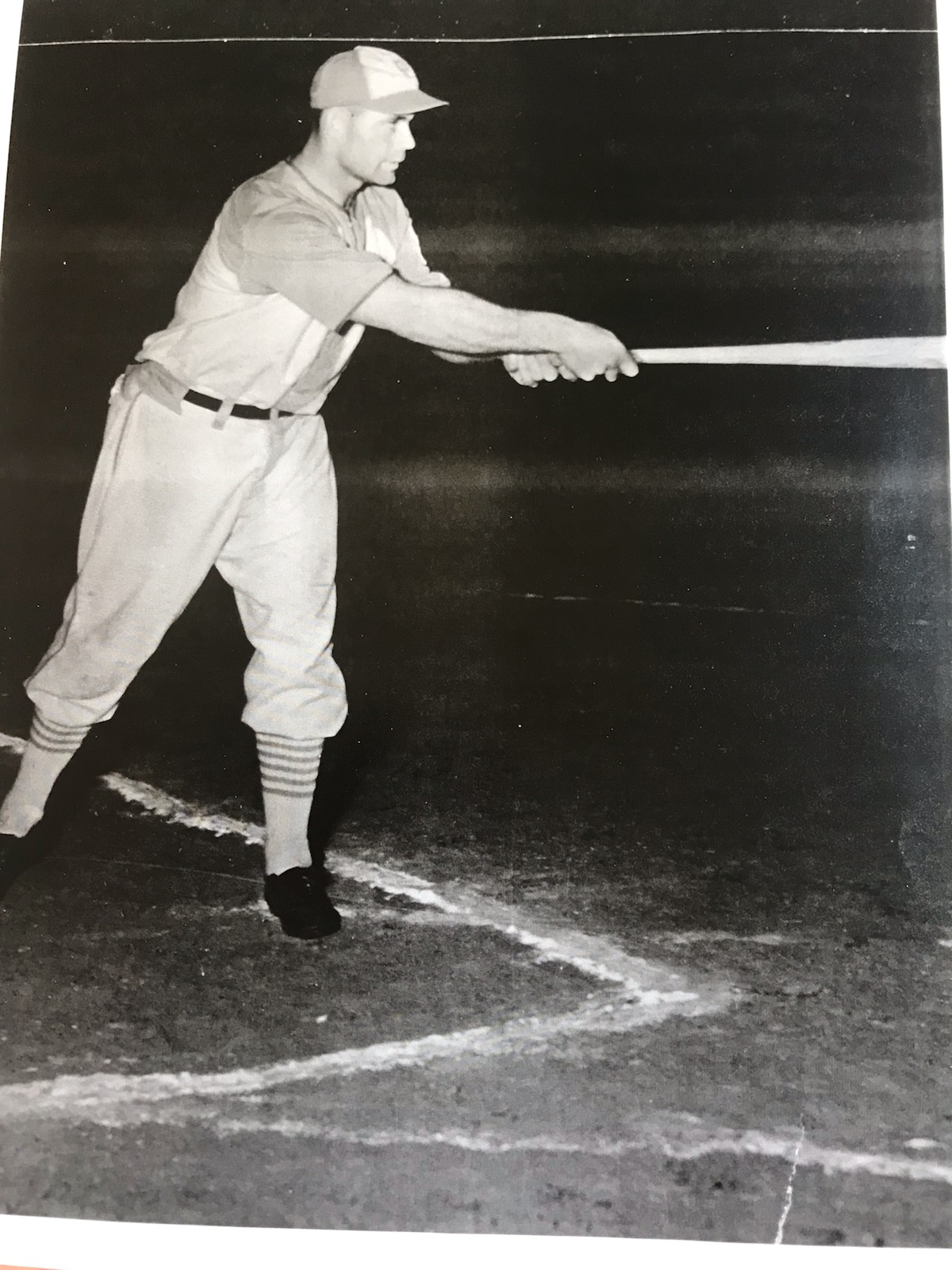
- Nell with the Borger Gassers
- Outfielder
- Born: August 17, 1907; Hollis, Oklahoma Territory
- Died: May 22, 1986 (aged 78); Texas, U.S.
- Batted: Right Threw: Unknown
- Stats at Baseball Reference

Gordon Nell (August 17, 1907 – May 22, 1986) was a minor league baseball player who hit over 350 career home runs. He won five home run titles and a Triple Crown.

He was born in Hollis, Oklahoma Territory. His professional career began in either 1929 or 1930, when he played for the Joplin Miners and Muskogee Chiefs; he led the Western Association with 27 home runs and also hit .351 with 107 runs scored. He hit 38 home runs with the Chiefs in 1931, again leading the league in homers. He also hit a home run in a brief stay with the Minneapolis Millers. After hitting 23 home runs between 1932 and 1933, Nell left professional baseball, not playing from 1934 to 1938.

In 1939, the outfielder returned, playing for the Pampa Oilers of the West Texas–New Mexico League. He would spend most of the rest of his career in the WTNML. In his first year back, he hit .392 with 44 home runs, 60 doubles, 207 hits, a .786 slugging percentage and 415 total bases in 135 games. He led the league in hits, doubles, home runs, runs scored (152), RBI (189), total bases and slugging percentage and he tied Sammy Hale for the league lead in batting average to win the Triple Crown. His hitting was so prodigious that he was considered the "bane of pitchers the league over" and "one of the most feared hitters in the country." Joining the Borger Gassers in 1940, Nell hit .389 with 40 home runs, 48 doubles, 15 triples, 206 hits, a .764 slugging percentage and 404 total bases. He won another home run title, led the league in RBI (175), total bases and slugging and — after taking over for Pete Susko as team manager partway through the season — led the team to a league championship victory. Back with Borger in 1941, Nell hit .316 with 28 home runs in 121 games, winning another home run title. He again served as the club's manager.

After not playing in 1942, 1943 and 1945 — and making only a handful of appearances in 1944 — Nell returned to Borger in 1946 and played for them until the end of his career in 1949. In 1946, the 38-year-old hit .335 with 43 home runs, 47 doubles, a .660 slugging mark and 374 total bases in 136 games to lead the league in doubles, RBI (175) and total bases. In 1947, Nell hit .344 with 49 home runs, 173 RBI and a .710 slugging percentage and was also the team manager; the next year, he hit .357 with 37 home runs, 48 doubles, 164 RBI, 133 runs scored and a .674 slugging percentage. At 41 years old, the slugger played his final season in 1949, hitting .319 with 29 home runs and 39 doubles.

Overall, Nell hit around .335 with 359 home runs, 403 doubles, 1,416 RBI, 1,183 runs, 1,803 hits and a .635 slugging percentage in his 12-year career.

He died in Borger, Texas.

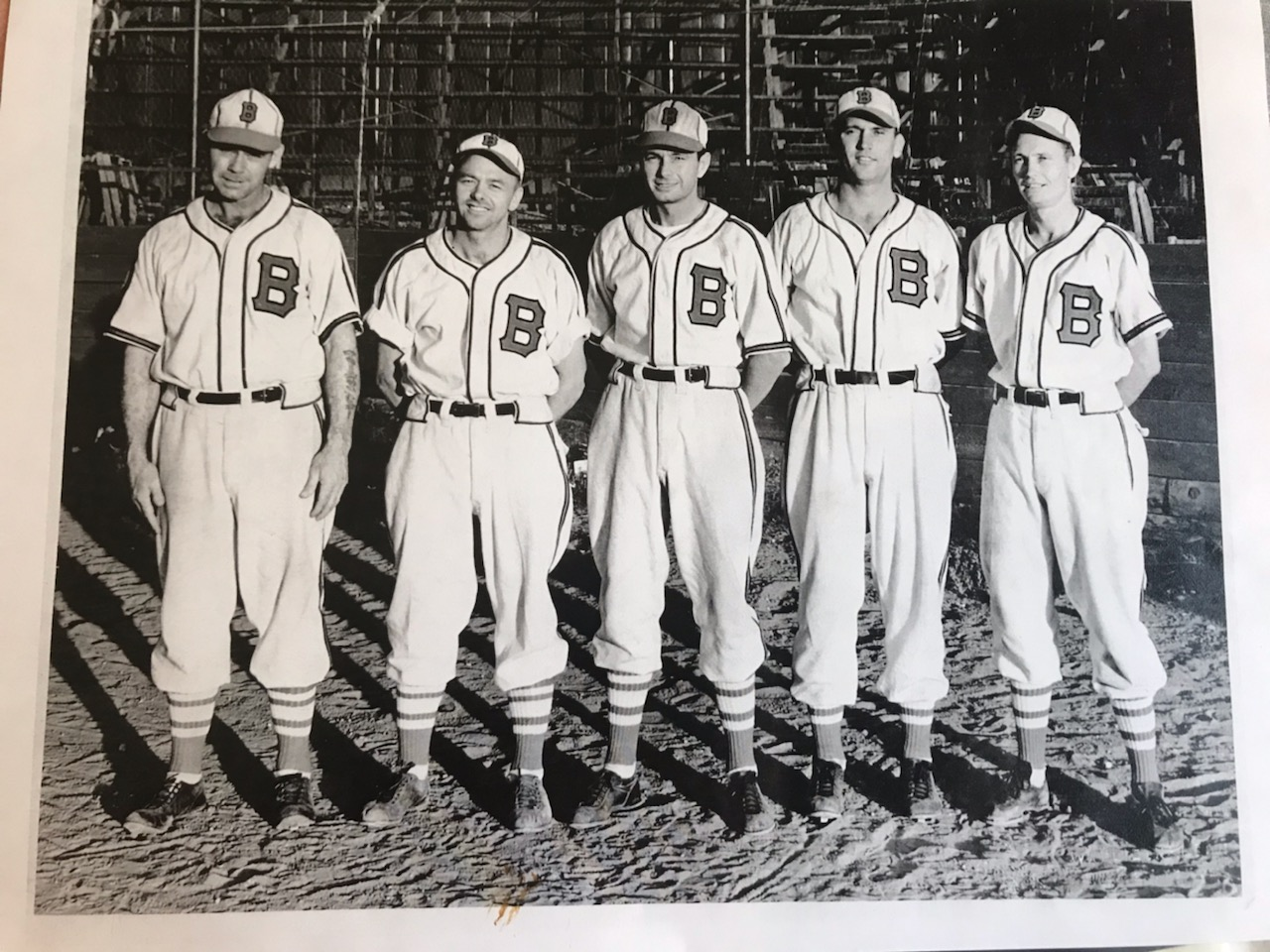
Gordon Nell (far left) of the Borger Gassers
