= Frank Evans (baseball) =

- Catcher / First baseman / Outfielder
- Born: December 1, 1921; Linden, Alabama, U.S.
- Died: August 3, 2012 (aged 90); Opelika, Alabama, U.S.
- Batted: Left Threw: Right

Frank Evans (December 1, 1921 – August 3, 2012) was an American professional baseball player in the Negro leagues.

He played for multiple Negro league teams in his career, which began in 1937. He played for the Memphis Red Sox, Kansas City Monarchs, Detroit Stars, Cleveland Buckeyes, Birmingham Black Barons and Philadelphia Stars. He manned multiple positions, including catcher, first base, outfield and occasionally pitcher.

In 1954, he played for the Port Arthur Sea Hawks and Borger Gassers of the Evangeline League and West Texas–New Mexico League, respectively, hitting .313 in 19 games.

He later served as a manager in the Negro Leagues and an instructor for multiple major league teams, coached for the Louisville Redbirds and served as a major league scout.
