= Ballinger Bearcats =

Minor League baseball team in Texas

The Ballinger Bearcats were a West Texas League baseball team based in Ballinger, Texas, United States that played in both incarnations of the league, in 1921 and in 1929. In 1921, they began as the Mineral Wells Resorters, moving to Ballinger partway through the season.

Major League Baseball players who either played or managed for the team include Roy Brashear, Pop-Boy Smith and Sam Langford.
