= Albuquerque Cardinals =

- 1937–1941; (1932, 1937–1941); Albuquerque, New Mexico

Minor league affiliations
- Class: Class D (1932, 1937–1939); Class C (1940–1941)
- League: Arizona-Texas League (1932, 1937–1941)

Major league affiliations
- Team: St. Louis Cardinals (1937–1941)

Minor league titles
- League titles (3): 1932; 1937; 1939
- Wild card berths (2): 1937; 1939

Team data
- Name: Albuquerque Dons (1932); Albuquerque Cardinals (1937–1941)
- Ballpark: Tingley Field (1932, 1937–1941)

The Albuquerque Cardinals were a minor league baseball team based in Albuquerque, New Mexico. Albuquerque teams played exclusively as a member of the Arizona-Texas League in 1932 and from 1937 to 1941, winning three league championships. The team played as the Albuquerque "Dons" in 1932 before the league folded, resuming play in 1937. The franchise became known as the Albuquerque "Cardinals" while serving as a minor league affiliate of the St Louis Cardinals from 1937 to 1941. The Dons and Cardinals hosted home minor league games at Tingley Field

== History ==
Minor league baseball first began in Albuquerque in 1915, when the Albuquerque Dukes played one season in the Rio Grande Association. The Albuquerque Dons returned minor league baseball to the city, joining the 1932 Class D level Arizona-Texas League

In 1932, Albuquerque Dons had a record of 57–42 and were in first place under Manager Bobby Coltrin when the five–team league disbanded on July 24, 1932. The Arizona-Texas League did not play for the next four seasons.

In 1937, the Arizona-Texas League reformed. The Albuquerque "Cardinals" took the moniker of their major league affiliate as they joined the Class D level league and won the league championship. The Albuquerque Cardinals played as an affiliate of the St. Louis Cardinals in 1937, the first of a five–year partnership. The Cardinals placed third with an overall record of 56–59, playing the season under manager Bill DeLancey. The 1937 regular season standings were led by the El Paso Texans with a 73–49 record, followed by Albuquerque (56–59), the Bisbee Bees (51–71), and Tucson Cowboys (57–58). Albuquerque won the second–half championship, after the Cardinals defeated El Paso in a one–game playoff for second–half championship to force a final series. El Paso had won the first–half championship. In the 1937 Finals, the Albuquerque defeated the El Paso 4 games to 3 to capture the 1937 championship. Total home attendance for the Cardinals was 30,110.

The 1938 Albuquerque Cardinals placed third in the four–team Arizona–Texas League regular season standings. The Cardinals ended the season with a 67–65 record, playing under returning manager Bill DeLancey and did not qualify for the playoff, won by El Paso. Albuquerque had season home attendance of 60,000, averaging 909 per home game. Albuquerque finished 6.0 games behind first place Bisbee in the final standings.

The 1939 Albuquerque Cardinals won their second Arizona–Texas League Championship. The Cardinals finished the regular season with a record of 70–60, placing second in the overall standings under manager Bill DeLancey, winning the second half–standings of the split–season schedule. In the playoff final, the Cardinals defeated the Bisbee-Douglas Bees 4 games to 2 to claim the 1939 championship. The Cardinals had home season attendance of 100,000.

The 1940 four-team Arizona–Texas League became a Class C level league. The Albuquerque Cardinals finished with a record of 60–64, placing third in the league, playing the season under manager Jack Farmer. The Cardinals did not play in the post season, won by El Paso over Tucson. The Cardinals finished 6.5 games behind 1st place Tucson in the final overall standings.

1941 was the final season for the Albuquerque Cardinals. The Arizona-Texas League continued as a four–team, Class C level league. The 1941 Cardinals manager was Jimmy Zinn. Under Zinn, the Cardinals finished 63–65, placing second in the league and finishing 21.0 games behind the first place Tucson Cowboys (86–46). No playoffs were held. The Arizona–Texas League folded after the 1941 season.

In 1942, Albuquerque continued play as the Albuquerque Dukes, joining the West Texas-New Mexico League. Today, Albuquerque is home to the Class AAA Albuquerque Isotopes.

== The ballpark ==
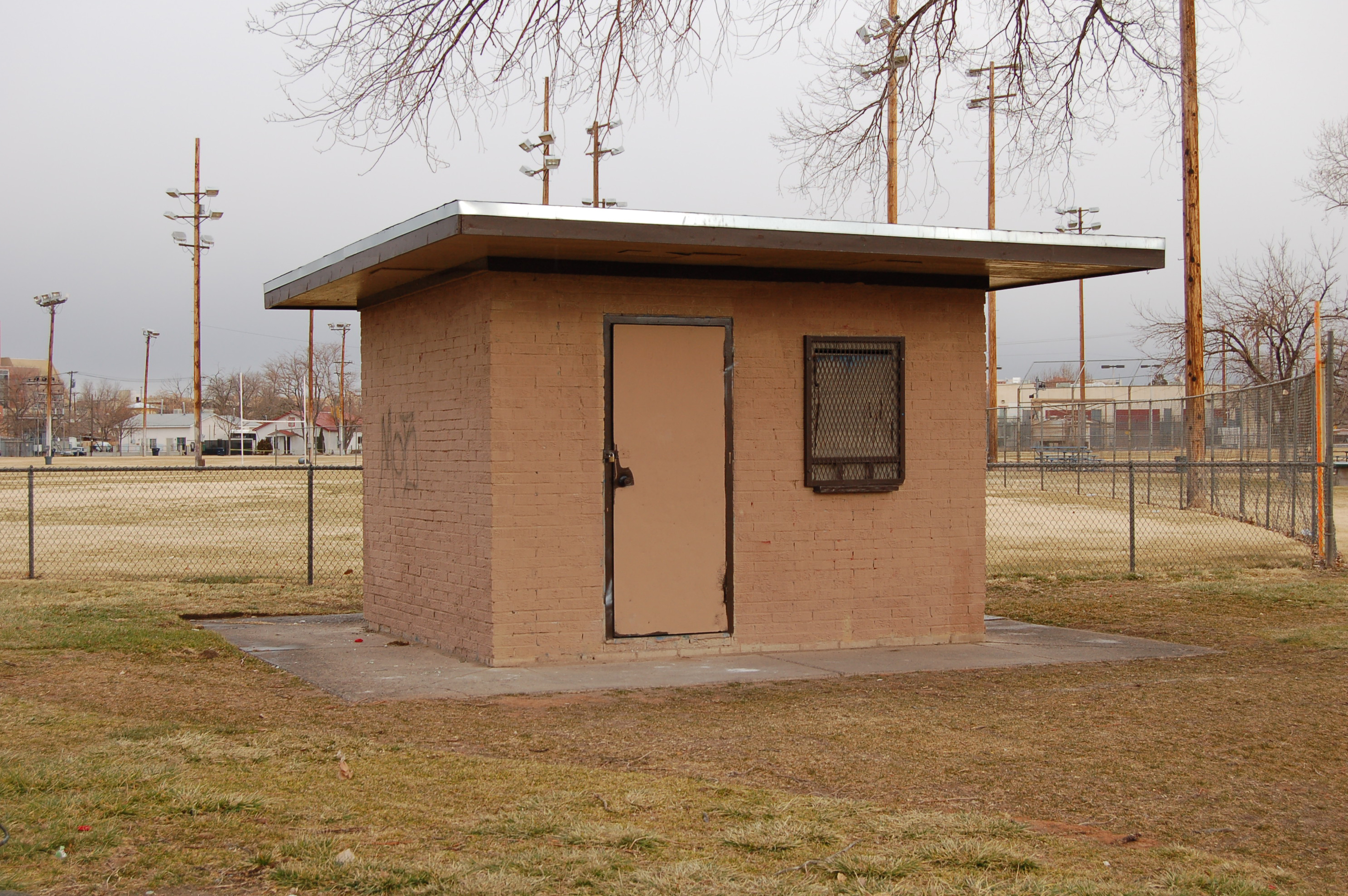
(2006) Tingley Field Ticket Office, Albuquerque, New Mexico.

The Albuquerque Dons and Albuquerque Cardinals played minor league home games at Tingley Field. Also called "Apprentice Field," the stadium was upgraded in 1937 with a $10,900 Works Progress Administration grant. The ballpark officially opened April 6, 1932. Tingley Field, was named for Mayor Clyde Tingley. St. Louis Cardinals general manager Branch Rickey was present for first game in 1937 and called Tingley Field "one of the finest minor league parks in America". Tingley Field was demolished in 1969. Today, the old ticket booth remains and the site is called Tingley Park, a public park with baseball and softball fields.

== Timeline ==
Year(s)	# Yrs.	Team	Level	League	Affiliate	Ballpark
1932	1	Albuquerque Dons	Class D	Arizona-Texas League	None	Tingley Field
1937–1939	3	Albuquerque Cardinals	Class D	Arizona-Texas League	St. Louis Cardinals	Tingley Field
1940–1941	2	Albuquerque Cardinals	Class C	Arizona-Texas League	St. Louis Cardinals	Tingley Field

== Season–by–season ==
Year	Record	Manager	Finish	Playoffs/Notes
1932	57–42	Bobby Coltrin	1st	League champions League Disbanded July 24
1937	56–59	Bill DeLancey	3rd	League champions
1938	67–65	Bill DeLancey	3rd	Did not qualify
1939	70–60	Bill DeLancey	2nd	League champions
1940	60–64	Jack Farmer	3rd	Did not qualify
1941	63–65	Jimmy Zinn	2nd	No playoffs held

== Notable alumni ==
- Dick Adams (1940)
- Italo Chelini (1932)
- Bill DeLancey (1937–1939, MGR)
- Bill Endicott (1937)
- Jack Farmer (1940, MGR)
- Dick Gyselman (1932)
- Johnny Hetki (1941)
- Lloyd Johnson (1932)
- Eddie Malone (1938)
- Dave Odom (1937)
- Warren Sandel (1939)
- Bobby Sturgeon (1937–1938)
- Jimmy Zinn (1941, MGR)

== See also ==
- Albuquerque Cardinals players
