= Tom Gee =

American baseball player (1900–1984)

- Catcher
- Born: February 9, 1900; Cleburne, Texas, U.S.
- Died: August 15, 1984 (aged 84); Phoenix, Arizona, U.S.
- Batted: Right Threw: Right

Negro league baseball debut
- 1925, for the Lincoln Giants

Last appearance
- 1926, for the Lincoln Giants
- Stats at Baseball Reference

Teams
- Lincoln Giants (1925–1926); Newark Stars (1926)

Thomas Henry Gee, Jr. (February 9, 1900 – August 15, 1984) was an American professional baseball catcher in the Negro leagues.

== Biography ==
Gee was born in Cleburne, Texas. He played for the minor league Abilene Eagles of the West Texas League from 1920 to 1922. He then played for the Lincoln Giants in 1925. In 1926, he started the year with the Newark Stars, but returned to the Giants after Newark disbanded midseason.

He died on August 15, 1984, in Phoenix, Arizona.

== Family life ==
Gee's brother, Rich Gee, also played in the Negro leagues, and was Tom's teammate with the Giants in 1925 and 1926.
