= Rich Gee =

American baseball player (1894–1968)

- Catcher
- Born: July 16, 1894; Cleburne, Texas, U.S.
- Died: January 3, 1968 (aged 73); Cleburne, Texas, U.S.
- Batted: Right Threw: Right

MLB debut
- 1923, for the New York Lincoln Giants

Last MLB appearance
- 1929, for the New York Lincoln Giants

MLB statistics
- Batting average: .288
- Home runs: 5
- Runs batted in: 60
- Stats at Baseball Reference

Teams
- New York Lincoln Giants (1923–1926); Brooklyn Royal Giants (1927); New York Lincoln Giants (1929)

Richard Raymond Gee (July 16, 1894 – January 3, 1968) was an American professional baseball catcher in the Negro leagues.

== Biography ==
Gee was born in Cleburne, Texas. He played for the minor league Abilene Eagles of the West Texas League from 1920-1922. He played for the Lincoln Giants from 1923 to 1926.

== Family life ==
Gee's brother, Tom Gee, also played in the Negro leagues, and was Rich's teammate with the Giants in 1925 and 1926.
