= Sweetwater Swatters =

The Sweetwater Swatters were a West Texas League (1920-1922) and Longhorn League (1949-1951) baseball team based in Sweetwater, Texas, United States. They began as the Gorman Buddies in 1920, however they moved to Sweetwater partway through the season.

Multiple major league baseball players spent time either player for or managing the team, including Guy Sturdy, Dick Gyselman, John Bottarini, Fred Besana, Pop-Boy Smith and Joe Bratcher.
