= Albuquerque Isotopes =

Minor league baseball team in New Mexico, US

- Founded in 2003; Albuquerque, New Mexico
Team logo
Cap insignia

Minor league affiliations
- Class: Triple-A (2003–present)
- League: Pacific Coast League (2003–present)
- Division: East Division

Major league affiliations
- Team: Colorado Rockies (2015–present)
- Previous teams: Los Angeles Dodgers (2009–2014); Florida Marlins (2003–2008)

Minor league titles
- League titles (0): None
- Division titles (3): 2003; 2009; 2012

Team data
- Name: Albuquerque Isotopes (2003–present)
- Colors: Black, red, white
- Mascot: Orbit
- Ballpark: Rio Grande Credit Union Field at Isotopes Park (2003–present)
- Owner/ Operator: Diamond Baseball Holdings
- General manager: John Traub
- Manager: Pedro Lopez
- Website: milb.com/albuquerque

The Albuquerque Isotopes are a Minor League Baseball team of the Pacific Coast League and the Triple-A affiliate of the Colorado Rockies. They play home games at Rio Grande Credit Union Field at Isotopes Park in Albuquerque, New Mexico, at an elevation of 5,100 feet (1,555 m) above sea level.

In 2003, the Calgary Cannons moved from Alberta to Albuquerque and became the Isotopes playing in the Pacific Coast League. Their name is a reference to an episode of The Simpsons as well as the nuclear technology industry in New Mexico. The team was affiliated with the Florida Marlins until 2008, the Los Angeles Dodgers from 2009 to 2014 and the Colorado Rockies since 2015. In conjunction with Major League Baseball's restructuring of Minor League Baseball in 2021, the Isotopes were organized into the Triple-A West, which was renamed the Pacific Coast League in 2022. The team won division titles in 2003, 2009, and 2012; it has never won a league championship.

The Isotopes' mascot is Orbit, a yellow, orange, and red alien (similar to the Houston Astros' mascot of the same name). In 2016, Forbes listed the team as the 14th-most valuable Minor League Baseball team with a value of $34 million. They are owned by Diamond Baseball Holdings.

== Background ==
The Isotopes were preceded in minor league baseball play by the Albuquerque Dukes of the 1915 Rio Grande Association, followed by the Albuquerque Dons and Albuquerque Cardinals, who played as members of the Arizona-Texas League from 1932 to 1941. In 1946, the Albuquerque Dukes began a long era of play as members of the West Texas-New Mexico League.

Albuquerque's previous minor-league team was the Los Angeles Dodgers-affiliated Albuquerque Dukes, which won several PCL championships in the 1970s and 1980s. The team was sold to Marshall Glickman and Mike Higgins, who moved it to Oregon in March 2000 and renamed it the Portland Beavers.

In January 2001, a group of businessmen led by Ken Young and Mike Koldyke agreed to buy the Calgary Cannons with the intention of bringing the team to Albuquerque for the 2003 season. But Young and Koldyke told the city of Albuquerque that they would only buy the team if the city would fund a new stadium or renovate the existing Albuquerque Sports Stadium. In May 2001, the city approved a vote to spend $25 million on a renovation. Ken Young and Mike Koldyke then bought the Cannons, moved the team to Albuquerque, and renamed it the Isotopes.

=== Name origins ===
The team's name recalls the fictional 'Springfield Isotopes' from the long-running TV series The Simpsons, first appearing in the season 2 episode "Dancin' Homer" (aired in 1990) in which the main character Homer Simpson temporarily becomes his local baseball team's mascot. In the season 12 episode "Hungry, Hungry Homer", which first aired on March 4, 2001, Homer attempts to thwart the team's plan to move to Albuquerque by going on a hunger strike. Subsequently, when the Albuquerque Tribune asked its online readers to help choose a new name for the Cannons, "Isotopes" received 67 percent of the 120,000 votes cast. "Dancin' Homer" writer Ken Levine said he was surprised when many Albuquerque journalists started calling him regarding the team name, as Isotopes had been chosen as "the funniest, goofiest name we could come up with" and he never thought it had potential for a real team, while adding that he had always liked the city's previous minor league team, the Albuquerque Dukes, as it was the farm team of the Los Angeles Dodgers he supported.

Though team president Ken Young admitted that the name came from the series, he said at the name's unveiling, "We picked it because over the past year it has become a popular name, and it does have something to do with Albuquerque." The "Isotopes" name was deemed appropriate, since New Mexico has a number of well-known scientific and military facilities dealing with nuclear technology, such as Los Alamos National Laboratory, Sandia National Laboratories, and the Waste Isolation Pilot Project (WIPP), as well as the site of the Trinity test. In addition, uranium mining was a significant industry in the state during the Cold War.

In the three months after the team's name was announced in September 2002, before the team ever took the field, the team sold more merchandise than the previous Albuquerque Dukes had sold in any single season, and led minor league baseball in merchandising revenue in 2003. The team said they were able to tell when episodes featuring the Springfield Isotopes would air in different markets based on clusters of orders from different viewing areas. The team has no working agreements with the rightsholders of The Simpsons. However, statues of Homer, Bart, Lisa, and Marge Simpson (originally created as a promotional item for the 2007 film) are located at RGCU Field at Isotopes Park.

== Team history ==
The planned renovation eventually turned into the construction of a new baseball facility, Isotopes Park, around the old playing field.

The Isotopes played their first official game in Albuquerque on April 11, 2003, three years after the Dukes left for Portland. At Isotopes Park, the baseball team was greeted by over 12,000 fans in their opening day game. In the Isotopes' opening season, the baseball team saw over 575,000 fans enter their stadium to watch their newly acquired team perform. During the 2003 season, Albuquerque saw immediate success as their new team won the 2003 Central Division Title and in addition to that, entered the 2003 Pacific Coast League Playoffs.

In 2008, the Albuquerque Isotopes achieved a new feat when they reached a new franchise record in attendance with over 590,000 fans.

In July 2009, Albuquerque received an unusual amount of nationwide attention following the arrival of Manny Ramirez. The outfielder at the time was under intense scrutiny for a suspension he received after testing positive for performance-enhancing drugs, more commonly known as PEDs, and was slated to play a total of three games with the Albuquerque Isotopes before returning to the major league. The Albuquerque Isotopes ran multiple promotions for the arrival of Manny Ramirez including advertisements, wigs bearing an extreme similarity to the hair of Manny Ramirez, etc. which ultimately led to a then-attendance record with over 15,000 fans attending the outfielder's opening game with the Isotopes. In addition to this, there was a large amount of harsh criticism towards the team from numerous sports media outlets including ESPN and sports commentators such as Bob Costas.

In conjunction with Major League Baseball's restructuring of Minor League Baseball in 2021, the Isotopes were organized into the Triple-A West. Albuquerque ended the season in fourth place in the Eastern Division with a 52–68 record. No playoffs were held to determine a league champion; instead, the team with the best regular-season record was declared the winner. However, 10 games that had been postponed from the start of the season were reinserted into the schedule as a postseason tournament called the Triple-A Final Stretch in which all 30 Triple-A clubs competed for the highest winning percentage. Albuquerque finished the tournament tied for seventh place with a 6–4 record. In 2022, the Triple-A West became known as the Pacific Coast League, the name historically used by the regional circuit prior to the 2021 reorganization.

The franchise was purchased by Diamond Baseball Holdings following the 2023 season.

In January 2026, Chrissy Baines became general manager of the Isotopes, which made her the first woman general manager in the history of Albuquerque professional baseball.

== Season-by-season records ==
Table key
| League | The team's final position in the league standings |
| Division | The team's final position in the divisional standings |
| GB | Games behind the team that finished in first place in the division that season |
| ‡ | Class champions (2003–present) |
| † | League champions (2003–present) |
| § | Conference champions (2003–2020) |
| * | Division champions (2003–2022) |

Season-by-season records
| Season | League | Regular-season | | | | | Postseason | | | MLB affiliate | Ref. |
| Season | League | Record | Win % | League | Division | GB | Record | Win % | Result | MLB affiliate | Ref. |
|---|---|---|---|---|---|---|---|---|---|---|---|
| 2003 * | PCL | 74–70 | .514 | 4th (tie) | 1st | — | 1–3 | .250 | Result | Won American Conference Central Division title Lost American Conference title vs. Nashville Sounds, 3–1 | Florida Marlins |
| 2004 | PCL | 67–77 | .465 | 12th | 4th | 12 1/2 | — | — | — | Florida Marlins | |
| 2005 | PCL | 78–66 | .542 | 5th | 2nd | 2 1/2 | — | — | — | Florida Marlins | |
| 2006 | PCL | 70–72 | .493 | 10th | 4th | 14 | — | — | — | Florida Marlins | |
| 2007 | PCL | 72–70 | .507 | 8th (tie) | 2nd | 2 | — | — | — | Florida Marlins | |
| 2008 | PCL | 68–75 | .476 | 10th | 2nd | 7 1/2 | — | — | — | Florida Marlins | |
| 2009 * | PCL | 80–64 | .556 | 2nd | 1st | — | 0–3 | .000 | Won American Conference Southern Division title Lost American Conference title vs. Memphis Redbirds, 3–0 | Los Angeles Dodgers | |
| 2010 | PCL | 72–71 | .503 | 10th | 2nd | 1 | — | — | — | Los Angeles Dodgers | |
| 2011 | PCL | 70–74 | .486 | 8th (tie) | 2nd | 17 | — | — | — | Los Angeles Dodgers | |
| 2012 * | PCL | 80–64 | .556 | 4th | 1st | — | 2–3 | .400 | Won American Conference Southern Division title Lost American Conference title vs. Omaha Storm Chasers, 3–2 | Los Angeles Dodgers | |
| 2013 | PCL | 76–68 | .528 | 6th (tie) | 2nd | 6 | — | — | — | Los Angeles Dodgers | |
| 2014 | PCL | 62–80 | .437 | 14th | 3rd | 18 | — | — | — | Los Angeles Dodgers | |
| 2015 | PCL | 62–82 | .431 | 14th | 3rd | 16 | — | — | — | Colorado Rockies | |
| 2016 | PCL | 71–72 | .497 | 7th (tie) | 2nd | 2 | — | — | — | Colorado Rockies | |
| 2017 | PCL | 68–73 | .482 | 10th (tie) | 3rd | 4 1/2 | — | — | — | Colorado Rockies | |
| 2018 | PCL | 63–77 | .450 | 14th | 4th | 19 1/2 | — | — | — | Colorado Rockies | |
| 2019 | PCL | 60–80 | .429 | 15th | 4th | 23 | — | — | — | Colorado Rockies | |
| 2020 | PCL | Season cancelled (COVID-19 pandemic) | | | | | | | | Colorado Rockies | |
| 2021 | AAAW | 58–72 (Note: In 2021, the team with the best record at the end of the regular-season was declared the Triple-A West champion. Albuquerque had a 52–68 (.433) record, 21 games behind first place, which put them 8th in the league and 4th in their division. The regular-season was followed by the Triple-A Final Stretch, a 10-game postseason tournament in which all 30 Triple-A clubs competed for the highest winning percentage. Albuquerque finished the tournament tied for 7th place with a 6–4 (.600) record.) | .446 | 7th | 4th | 17 | — | — | — | Colorado Rockies | |
| 2022 | PCL | 62–86 | .419 | 10th | 5th | 22 | — | — | — | Colorado Rockies | |
| 2023 | PCL | 68–82 | .453 | 7th | 3rd | 23 | — | — | — | Colorado Rockies | |
| 2024 | PCL | 58–92 | .387 | 10th | 5th | 35 1/2 | — | — | — | Colorado Rockies | |
| 2025 | PCL | 62–87 | .416 | 10th | 5th | 21 1/2 | — | — | — | Colorado Rockies | |
| 2026 | PCL | 73–77 | .487 | 5th (tie) | 3rd (tie) | 16 1/2 | — | — | — | Colorado Rockies | |
| Totals | — | 1,574–1,731 | .476 | — | — | — | 3–9 | .250 | — | — | — |

== Roster ==
Albuquerque Isotopes roster
| Players | Coaches/Other |
|---|---|
| Pitchers: 44 Domingo Acevedo ‡; 31 Blake Adams *; 63 Andrew Baker; 56 Valente Bellozo * ~; 36 Jake Brooks; 40 Jarrod Cande; 62 Blas Castano *; 55 Eiberson Castellano *; 23 Jeff Criswell *; 50 Ryan Feltner * #; 26 Tanner Gordon * #; 51 Hayden Harris *; 44 Jaden Hill * #; 43 Gabriel Hughes * #; 43 Mason Green; 22 Jack Mahoney; 53 Ryan Miller; 65 Parker Mushinski *; 37 Jose Quintana * #; 61 Evan Shawver; 27 TJ Shook *; 57 Sean Sullivan *; 35 Keegan Thompson *; 38 Patrick Weigel; 60 Case Williams; Catchers: 4 Bryant Betancourt; 30 Jose Cordova; Infielders: 18 Blaine Crim *; 9 Edouard Julien *; 25 Nic Kent; 12 Vimael Machin *; 6 Roc Riggio; 47 Ryan Ritter *; 39 Chad Stevens *; Outfielders: 11 Drew Avans; 14 Connor Capel; 24 Charlie Condon; 20 Tyler Freeman *; 8 Sterlin Thompson * | Manager: 16 Pedro Lopez; Coaches: 54 Craig Bjornson (pitching); 3 Luis Lopez (bench); 29 Matt Snyder (hitting); 60-day injured list: 31 Mason Albright; -- Jarrod Cande; -- Evan Justice; 60 Adam Laskey; 7-day injured list; * On Colorado Rockies 40-man roster; ~ Development list; # Rehab assignment; ∞ Reserve list; ‡ Restricted list; § Suspended list; † Temporarily inactive list; Roster updated September 19, 2026; Transactions; → More rosters: MiLB • Pacific Coast League; → Colorado Rockies minor league players |

== Awards ==
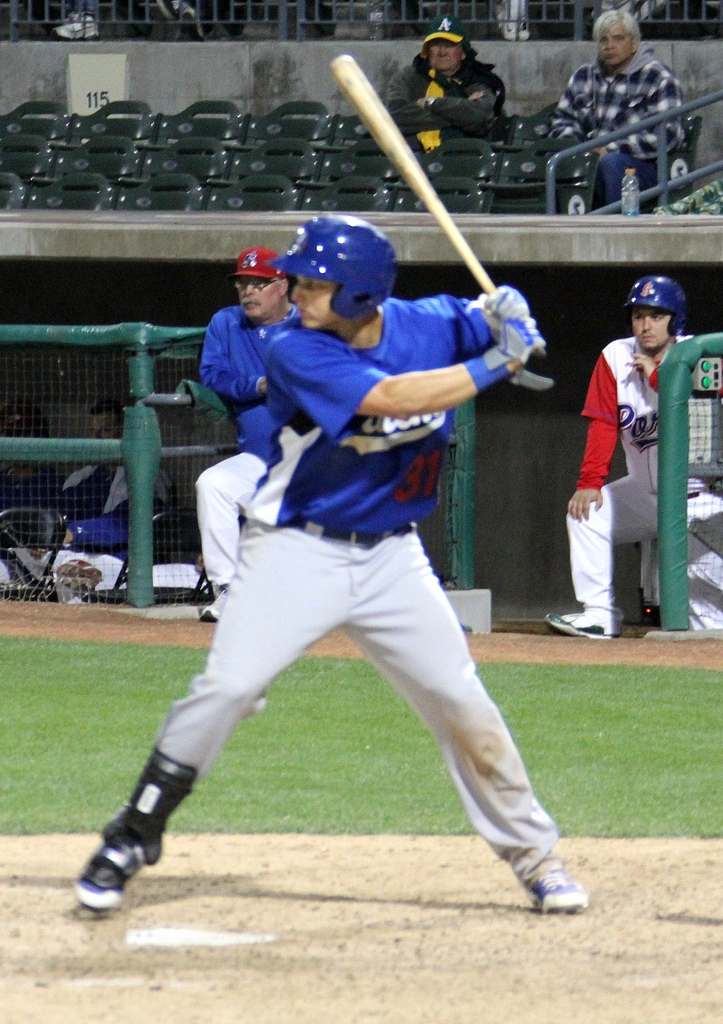
Joc Pederson

- In September 2009, Mitch Jones was named the winner of the Joe Bauman Home Run Award, for the most home runs, 35, in minor league baseball.
- In 2014, Joc Pederson, after leading the league in OBP (.435), runs (106), home runs (33), walks (100), and OPS (1.017), and setting Isotopes single-season records for walks and runs scored, was voted the 2014 PCL Most Valuable Player, named to the post-season All-PCL team, and named the PCL Rookie of the Year, which is awarded to a player in his first year at the Triple-A level. He was also selected to Baseball America's 2014 Minor League All-Star team.

== Notable broadcasters ==
- Mike Roberts, longtime (1966–2013) Albuquerque sports announcer on TV and radio for local news, professional baseball, college football and basketball, and high school sports broadcasts
- Bob Socci, 2003–2006
- Russ Langer 1996–2000, former Montreal Expos and Baltimore Orioles fill-in broadcaster

== Cultural references ==
- In the USA Network series In Plain Sight, the character Raphael Ramirez (Cristián de la Fuente) plays for the Isotopes.
- In the AMC series Breaking Bad, which is set in Albuquerque, Walter White can be seen wearing an Isotopes hat. In the Breaking Bad prequel series Better Call Saul, Mike Ehrmantraut watches an Isotopes game on TV in the opening episode of Season 4 (set in 2003). Additionally, in a flashforward the same episode, an Isotopes air freshener can be seen hanging in Jeff's cab when he picks up "Gene Takavic" in Omaha, Nebraska.
- In the NBC series The Voice, music producer Adam Blackstone wore an Albuquerque Isotopes hat during Season One Battle Rounds preparations.
