= Monahans Trojans =

- 1937; Monahans, Texas

Minor league affiliations
- Class: Class D (1937)
- League: West Texas-New Mexico League (1937)

Major league affiliations
- Team: None

Minor league titles
- Wild card berths (1): 1937

Team data
- Name: Monahans Trojans (1937)
- Ballpark: Allen Park (1937)

The Monahans Trojans were a minor league baseball team based in Monahans, Texas for one season. In 1937, the "Trojans" played as charter members of the Class D level West Texas-New Mexico League, qualifying for the league playoffs.

The Monahans Trojans hosted minor league home games at Allen Park, which is still in use today as a public park. The Allen Park ballpark had a distance of 600 feet to the outfield fence in left field.

== History ==
Minor league baseball began in Monahans, Texas in 1937. The "Trojans" became charter members of the six–team, Class D level West Texas-New Mexico League. The Hobbs Drillers, Midland Cardinals, Odessa Oilers, Roswell Sunshiners and Wink Spudders joined Monahans in beginning league play on May 4, 1937.

In their only season of play, Monahans qualified for the West Texas-New Mexico League playoffs. The Trojans ended the regular season in third place with a record of 55–64, after two other league teams folded during the season. Playing the season under managers Paul Trammell and Charles Bryan, Monahans finished 13½ games ahead the first place Wink Spudders. The final overall regular season standings were led Wink, followed by the Roswell Sunshiners (55–62), Monahans (55–64) and Hobbs Drillers (45–74). The Odessa Oilers (28–17) and Midland Cardinals (41–25) franchises both folded before the end of the season. In the first round of the playoffs, the Roswell Sunshiners defeated the Monahans Trojans three games to two in the final games for the Monahans franchise.

In 1938, The six–team West Texas-New Mexico League continued play without the Monahans franchise. Roswell was also folded as Midland reformed in 1938. Midland joined Hobbs and Wink in continuing West Texas-New Mexico League play with three new teams, as the Big Spring Barons, Clovis Pioneers and Lubbock Hubbers teams joined the league.

Monahans, Texas has not hosted another minor league team.

== The ballpark ==
The Monahans Trojans teams hosted minor league home games at Allen Park. The ballpark had unique dimensions of (Left, Center, Right): 600-480-390. the Allen Park ballpark was located at East C Street & Harry Avenue. Allen Park is still in use today as a public park, located as 200 South Harry Avenue.

== Year–by–year record ==
Year	Record	Finish	Manager	Playoffs/Notes
1937	55–64	3rd	Paul Trammell / Charles Bryan	Lost in 1st round

== Notable alumni ==
- Jess Pike (1937)
- Monahans Trojans players
