= Ed Kallina =

American baseball and football player (1901–1963)

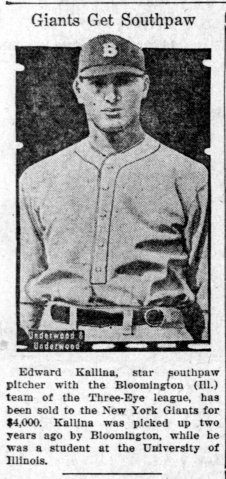
- newspaper photo
- First Baseman / Pitcher
- Born: October 27, 1901; Nada, Texas, U.S.
- Died: May 15, 1963 (aged 61); Houston, Texas, U.S.
- Batted: Right Threw: Left

Baseball debut
- 1925, for the Bloomington Bloomers

Career statistics
- Games: 354
- Plate Appearances: 1160
- Hits/Hits Allowed: 407
- Home Runs Hit/Allowed: 80

Teams
- Bloomington Bloomers (1925-1927); Des Moines Demons (1927); Tulsa Oilers (1928); Abilene Aces (1928); Sherman Snappers (1929); Midland Colts (1929); Joplin Miners (1930)
Football career
Profile
Position	Offensive Lineman
Personal information
Listed height	6 ft 0 in (1.83 m)
Listed weight	205 lb (93 kg)
Career information
High school	Sam Marcos (TX)
College	Sam Houston State, Texas State
Career history
Chicago Bears (1928)
Stats at Pro Football Reference

Edward James Kallina (October 27, 1901 – May 15, 1963) was an American minor league baseball player and football offensive lineman. He played baseball from 1925 to 1930 and football in 1928.

== Early life and education ==
Ed Kallina was born on October 27, 1901, in Nada, Texas. He went to college at Sam Houston State and at Texas State

== Baseball career ==
=== Bloomington Bloomers ===
He started his baseball career as a minor league player for the Bloomington Bloomers. They were in the Illinois-Indiana-Iowa League. He played with them from 1925 to 1927. In 1925 he played in 31 games and had 79 plate appearances. As a pitcher he had a 3–7 record. In 1926 he played in 56 games and had 144 plate appearances. He had a 7–14 record when he was a pitcher. In 1927 he played for two teams. With the Bloomers he pitched a 3–3 record.

=== Des Moines Demons ===
For part of 1927, he played for the Des Moines Demons. He played in 25 games for them. When pitching he had a 2–3 record.

=== Tulsa Oilers ===
In 1928, he played for the Tulsa Oilers. He played in 13 games for them. He had 29 plate appearances.

=== Abilene Aces ===
He also played for the Abilene Aces in 1928. No statistics were recorded for when he played with them.

=== Sherman Snappers ===
In 1929 he played for the Sherman Snappers. He played in 17 games for them.

=== Midland Colts ===
He also played with the Midland Colts in 1929. He played in 94 games with them. He had 44 Home Runs Hit/Allowed in 1929.

=== Joplin Miners ===
His final season was in 1930 with the Joplin Miners. He played in 118 games with them.

== Football career ==
=== Chicago Bears ===
In 1928 he played one season for the Chicago Bears of the NFL. He played in 4 games as an offensive lineman for them.

== Later life ==
He died on May 15, 1963, in Houston, Texas.
