= Amarillo Gassers =

Baseball team based in Amarillo, Texas

The Amarillo Gassers were a West Texas League (1922) and Panhandle-Pecos Valley League (1923) baseball team based in Amarillo, Texas, United States. They won the 1922 West Texas League championship under manager Jack Meanor, beating the Clovis Buzzers five games to one. They were on pace to finish first in 1923, however the Panhandle-Pecos League folded before the end of the season.
