= Cisco Scouts =

Defunct West Texas League baseball team

The Cisco Scouts were a West Texas League baseball team based in Cisco, Texas, United States that played from 1920 to 1921. In 1921, they changed their name to the Cisco Orphans, but eventually disbanded.

Major league players Joe Bratcher and Tim Griesenbeck played for them.
