= Virgil Richardson =

Virgil Richardson may refer to:

- Virgil Donald Richardson (1917–2014), American minor league baseball player
- Virgil J. Richardson (1916–2004), Tuskegee Airman and actor
