= Tom Lovelace =

American baseball player (1897–1979)

- Pinch hitter
- Born: October 19, 1897; Wolfe City, Texas, U.S.
- Died: July 12, 1979 (aged 81); Dallas, Texas, U.S.
- Batted: Right Threw: Right

MLB debut
- September 23, 1922, for the Pittsburgh Pirates

Last MLB appearance
- September 23, 1922, for the Pittsburgh Pirates

MLB statistics
- Games played: 1
- At bats: 1
- Hits: 0
- Stats at Baseball Reference

Teams
- Pittsburgh Pirates (1922)

Thomas Rivers Lovelace (October 19, 1897 – July 12, 1979) was an American professional baseball player. Lovelace played in the minor leagues for 11 years, from 1920 to 1932, and played in one Major League Baseball game with the Pittsburgh Pirates in 1922.

Lovelace was born in Wolfe City, Texas, on October 19, 1897. He made his Minor League debut in 1920 as an outfielder for the Ranger Nitros of the West Texas League. He had a .267 batting average in 102 games for the Nitros. In 1922, Lovelace split time with the Greenville Togs and the Dallas Steers. He hit .332 for both teams in 146 games. On September 5, 1922, while playing for Dallas, Lovelace was sold to the Pittsburgh Pirates of the National League.

On September 23, 1922, the Pirates were playing the Brooklyn Robins in the first game of a doubleheader at Ebbets Field in Brooklyn and Lovelace made his major league debut. In the top of the 9th inning, with the Pirates down 9–5, Lovelace pinch hit for pitcher Hal Carlson. With a runner, Charlie Grimm, on first, Lovelace lined out to the Robins' second baseman Ivy Olson. Lovelace broke his leg sliding in to first base, making the Brooklyn game the first, and only major league game of his career.

Lovelace continued to play with various minor league teams until 1932. He finished with a career .309 batting average in the minors in 914 games. He died on July 12, 1979, in Dallas, Texas, and was cremated.
