= Eastland Judges =

Minor league baseball team in Texas

- 1920; Eastland, TX

Minor league affiliations
- League: West Texas League, 1920

Team data
- Manager: James Maloney

The Eastland Judges were a West Texas League baseball team based in Eastland, Texas, United States that played in 1920. Managed by James Maloney, they featured two players who would go on to play major league baseball: Joe Bratcher and Virgil Cheeves.

They are the only professional team to ever come out of Eastland, Texas.
