= Fred Besana (baseball) =

American baseball player (1931–2015)

- Pitcher
- Born: April 5, 1931; Lincoln, California, U.S.
- Died: November 7, 2015 (aged 84); Lincoln, California, U.S.
- Batted: Right Threw: Left

MLB debut
- April 18, 1956, for the Baltimore Orioles

Last MLB appearance
- May 13, 1956, for the Baltimore Orioles

MLB statistics
- Win–loss record: 1–0
- Earned run average: 5.60
- Strikeouts: 7
- Stats at Baseball Reference

Teams
- Baltimore Orioles (1956)

Frederick Cyril Besana (April 5, 1931 – November 7, 2015) was an American professional baseball pitched who played in Major League Baseball (MLB) for the Baltimore Orioles in 1956. He also played in the minor leagues for eight seasons.

== Playing career ==
Besana made his Major League debut on April 18, 1956, at the age of 25. In his first appearance, he pitched two innings, allowing two walks while striking out one batter (Don Buddin) and allowing no runs to score. In total, he appeared in seven games in his sole big league season and posted a 1–0 record with a 5.60 ERA. On April 22, he made the first of two career starts, picking up the victory against the Washington Senators. He appeared in his final big league game on May 13.

Besana pitched in the minor leagues in 1950, from 1954 to 1959 and in 1960. In his first professional season, he won 18 games for the Sweetwater Swatters and Albuquerque Dukes, despite posting a 5.14 ERA. With the Vancouver Mounties in 1959, he posted a 2.77 ERA in 32 games. Overall, Besana went 58–67 with a 4.33 ERA in 254 minor league games.

== Post-playing career ==
Besana also coached at the high-school level (Oakmont High School and Roseville High School) and at the American River College.

== Personal life ==
His son, Fred Besana, played in the National Football League and United States Football League.
