= Panhandle-Pecos Valley League =

Class D level baseball minor league

Panhandle–Pecos Valley League
- Formerly: West Texas League
- Classification: Class D (1923)
- Sport: Minor League Baseball
- First season: 1923
- Folded: August 15, 1923
- President: S.D. Hunter (1923)
- No. of teams: 4
- Country: United States of America
- Most titles: 1 Lubbock Hubbers (1923)

The Panhandle–Pecos Valley League was a minor league baseball league that played in the 1923 season. The Class D level Panhandle–Pecos Valley League featured four teams based in New Mexico and Texas. The league permanently folded during its first season of play, with the Lubbock Hubbers capturing the only championship of the short–lived league.

== History ==
The Panhandle–Pecos Valley League was formed for the 1923 season as a Class D level minor league. The league president was S.D. Hunter. The Panhandle–Pecos Valley League evolved from the 1922 eight–team West Texas League, as three members became the foundation of the Panhandle-Pecos Valley League. The 1923 Panhandle–Pecos Valley League began play as a four–team league, hosting franchises from Amarillo, Texas (Amarillo Gassers), Clovis, New Mexico (Clovis Cubs), Lubbock, Texas (Lubbock Hubbers) and Roswell, New Mexico (Roswell Giants). Amarillo, Colvis and Lubbock had played in the 1922 West Texas League.

The Panhandle–Pecos Valley League began play on May 8, 1923, with a split–season schedule. The league permanently disbanded on August 15, 1923. The overall standings were led by the Amarillo Gassers (62–42), followed by the Lubbock Hubbers (57–47), Clovis Cubs (48–56) and Roswell Giants (41–63). Lubbock won the first half pennant and Clovis won the second half pennant. Amarillo was also named a playoff qualifier and the league did hold a nine–game playoff, which was won by the Lubbock Hubbers 5 games to 4 over the Amarillo Gassers.

== Panhandle–Pecos Valley League teams ==
Team name(s)	City represented	Ballpark	Year(s) active
Amarillo Gassers	Amarillo, Texas	Glenwood ballpark	1923
Clovis Cubs	Clovis, New Mexico	League Park	1923
Lubbock Hubbers	Lubbock, Texas	Merrill Base Ball Park	1923
Roswell Giants	Roswell, New Mexico	League Park	1923

== Standings & statistics ==
1923 Panhandle–Pecos Valley League

Team standings	W	L	PCT	GB	Managers
Amarillo Gassers	62	42	.596	–	Clyde Anheier / O.R. Moore
Lubbock Hubbers	57	47	.548	5	Sled Allen
Clovis Cubs	48	56	.461	14	Pop-Boy Smith / Frank Fuller
Roseburg Shamrocks	41	63	.394	21	Charley O'Day

Player statistics
Player	Team	Stat	Tot	Player	Team	Stat	Tot
Ben Bedford	Roswell	BA	.354	Dick Morgan	Lubbock	W	17
Robert Clary	Clovis	Runs	83	Mike File	Clovis	W	17
Ben Bedford	Roswell	Hits	134	Harry Swenson	Lubbock	SO	162
Ed Shaw	Amarillo	HR	19	Dick Morgan	Lubbock	PCT	.654 17–9
