= Tingley Field =

Baseball stadium in Albuquerque, New Mexico

Coordinates: 35.078°N 106.659°W

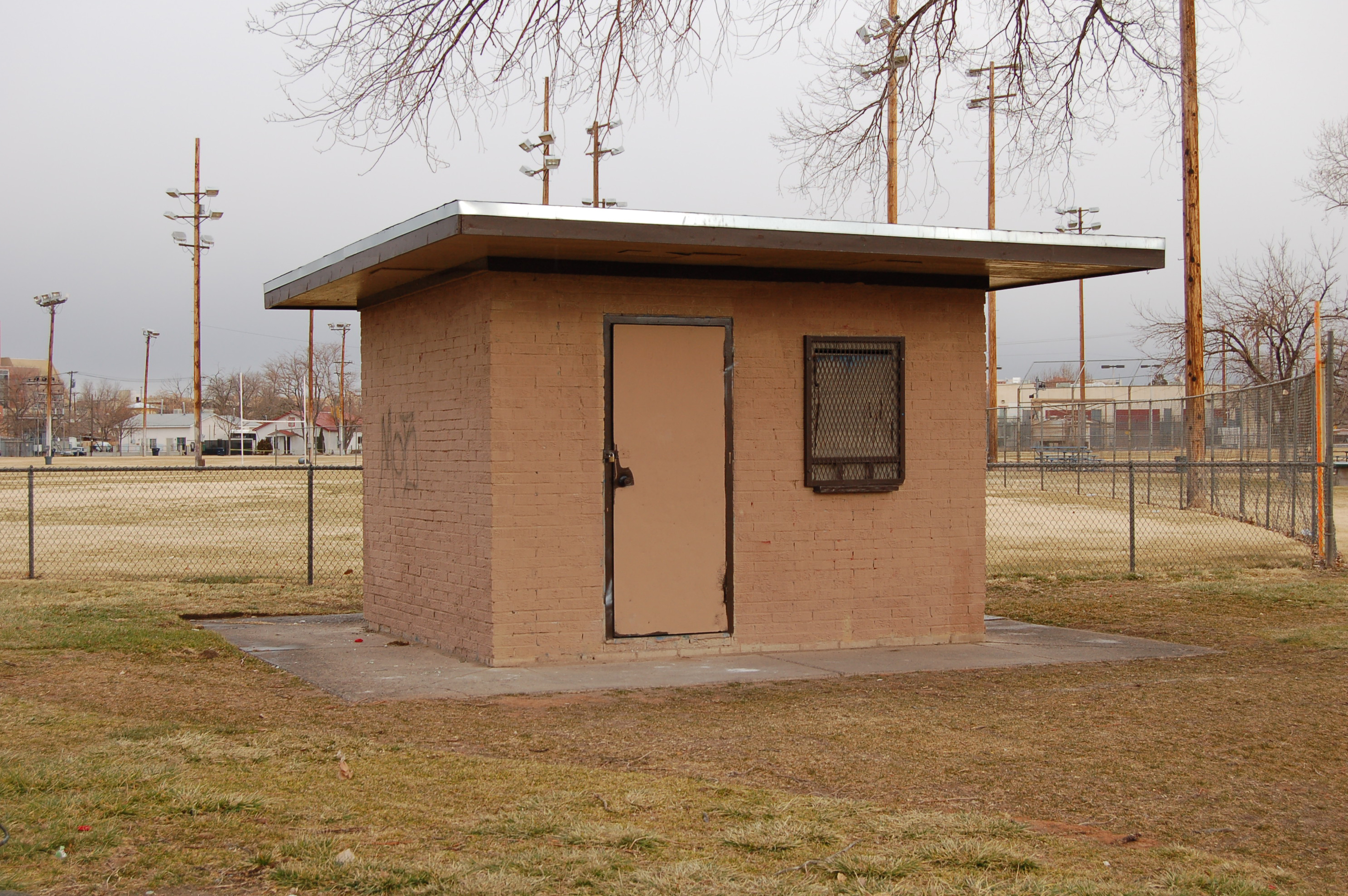
The former ticket office is the only surviving part of Tingley Field

Tingley Field (originally named Rio Grande Park) was a baseball stadium in Albuquerque, New Mexico, which served as the home of professional baseball in Albuquerque from 1932 to 1968. It could accommodate 5000 fans, with seating for 3000.

The stadium was located on the northeast corner of 10th Street and Atlantic Avenue, across the street from the Rio Grande Zoo.

== Design ==
Tingley Field had a 3000-seat concrete grandstand with a small pressbox which could accommodate only a few people. The outfield wall was built out of adobe. There were several light standards and telephone poles within the stadium itself, which occasionally caused problems for outfielders or interfered with potential home runs. The park was roughly the same size as Albuquerque Sports Stadium (360 feet to left field, 350 feet to right field, and 425 feet to center), though the exact dimensions vary by source.

== History ==
The site of Tingley Field was originally one of several public baseball fields used by Albuquerque's various semi-professional teams in the early 20th century. One of these teams was the Apprentices, made up of Santa Fe Railroad employees. In the late 1920s the Apprentices leased the field and built a fence and wooden grandstand with a capacity of roughly 1,000. The stadium was initially called Apprentice Field but was renamed Rio Grande Park a few years later.

In 1932, the Albuquerque Dons began play in the Class D Arizona–Texas League. The Dons' business manager, Marty Fiedler, oversaw an expansion of the stadium that added two new grandstands along with bleachers, box seats, and lights for night games. The project cost around $10,000, most of which was spent on the lighting system. The finished stadium had around 3,200 seats. Shortly after the beginning of the season, the stadium was renamed Tingley Field after Clyde Tingley. The Dons compiled a league-best 57–42 record, but their success was short-lived as the Arizona–Texas League folded in July.

Professional baseball returned to Albuquerque in 1937 when the Albuquerque Cardinals, an affiliate of the St. Louis Cardinals, began play in the reorganized Arizona–Texas League. The stadium was upgraded by the Works Progress Administration and reopened on April 7, 1937 with an exhibition game against the Pittsburgh Pirates, who defeated the home team 12–5. St. Louis Cardinals general manager Branch Rickey was present for the game and praised the stadium as "one of the finest minor league parks in America". The Cardinals won the league pennant that year and again in 1939, but the league disbanded a second time in 1941.

During World War II, the stadium was used for Army ballgames. In 1946, the Albuquerque Dukes were established and began play in the Class C West Texas–New Mexico League. Apart from a brief hiatus in 1959, the stadium remained the home of various incarnations of the Dukes until 1968, when voters approved the construction of a new stadium in southeast Albuquerque. Tingley Field had begun to show its age, and city officials hoped a larger and more modern ballpark would help the city attract a Triple-A team.

Tingley Field was demolished in 1969 and redeveloped into a public park with softball and football fields. The only remaining parts of the former stadium are the light standards and ticket office. A large concrete baseball that originally sat outside Tingley was moved to Albuquerque Sports Stadium in 1969 and remains on display in front of Isotopes Park.
