= Gorman Buddies =

Minor league baseball team from Texas

The Gorman Buddies were a West Texas League baseball team based in Gorman, Texas, United States that played for part of the 1920 season. Before the season ended, they moved to Sweetwater, Texas to become the Sweetwater Swatters. They are the only professional team to come out of Gorman, Texas.

Major league baseball player Guy Sturdy played for them.
