= Wink Spudders =

- 1937–1938; Wink, Texas

Minor league affiliations
- Class: Class D (1937–1938)
- League: West Texas-New Mexico League (1937–1938)

Major league affiliations
- Team: None

Minor league titles
- League titles (1): 1937
- Conference titles (1): 1937
- Wild card berths (1): 1938

Team data
- Name: Wink Spudders (1937–1938)
- Ballpark: Spudder Park (1937–1938)

The Wink Spudders were a minor league baseball team based in Wink, Texas. In 1937 and 1938, the Spudders played exclusively as members of the Class D level West Texas-New Mexico League, winning the 1937 league championship. Wink hosted minor league home games at Spudder Park.

== History ==
Minor league baseball began in Wink, Texas in 1937. The Wink "Spudders" became charter members of the six–team Class D level West Texas-New Mexico League. The Hobbs Drillers, Midland Cardinals, Monahans Trojans, Odessa Oilers and Roswell Sunshiners teams joined with Wink as charter league members.

The Wink use "Spudders" moniker corresponds to local potato industry and agriculture in Wink, Texas in the era.

In their first season of play, the Wink Spudders won the West Texas-New Mexico League pennant and championship. Wink began play in the West Texas-New Mexico League on May 4, 1937 and finished the season with a record of 68–50, playing under managers D.E. Perry and Joe Tate. Wink placed first overall in the league regular season standings, finishing 12.5 games ahead the second place Roswell Sunshiners. The final overall regular season standings were led Wink, followed by the Roswell Sunshiners (55–62), Monahans Trojans (55–64) and Hobbs Drillers (45–74). The Odessa Oilers (28–17) and Midland Cardinals (41–25) franchises both folded before the end of the season. In the first round of the playoffs, Wink swept the Hobbs Drillers in 3 games to advance. In the Finals, Wink defeated the Roswell Sunshiners 3 games to 0 to win the championship. Robert Hood of Wink had a Triple Crown season, leading the West Texas-New Mexico League with a .372 average, 30 home runs and 140 RBI. Teammate Red Hay led the league with 18 wins and a 3.97 ERA.

In 1938, the Wink Spudders played their final minor league season. Continuing play in the six–team West Texas-New Mexico League, Wink placed fourth in the final regular season standings and qualified for the playoffs. The Spudders finished the season with a record of 63–65, playing under returning manager Joe Tate. Wink finished 16.0 games behind the first place Lubbock Hubbers in the final standings. In the 1st round of the playoffs, Lubbock swept Wink in 3 games. Pitcher Red Roberts of Wink led the West Texas-New Mexico League with a 3.08 ERA.

After the 1938 season, the Wink Spudders franchise permanently folded as the 1939 West Texas-New Mexico League expanded to eight teams without Wink. Wink, Texas has not hosted another minor league team.

== The ballpark ==
The Wink Spudders teams hosted minor league home games at Spudder Park. The ballpark site is still in use today as a public park called Winkler County Park. Winkler Park is located on NW 2nd Street, Wink, Texas.

== Timeline ==
| Year(s) | # Yrs. | Team | Level | League | Ballpark |
|---|---|---|---|---|---|
| 1937–1938 | 2 | Wink Spudders | Class D | West Texas-New Mexico League | Spudder Park |

== Year–by–year records ==
| Year | Record | Finish | Manager | Playoffs/Notes |
|---|---|---|---|---|
| 1937 | 68–50 | 1st | D.E. Perry / Joe Tate | League champions |
| 1938 | 63–65 | 4th | Joe Tate | Lost 1st round |

== Notable alumni ==
- Dick Adkins (1937)
- Cal Dorsett (1937)
