= Sled Allen =

American baseball player and manager

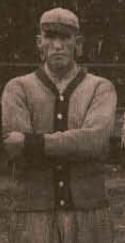
- Catcher / Manager
- Born: August 23, 1886; West Plains, Missouri, U.S.
- Died: October 16, 1959 (aged 72); Lubbock, Texas, U.S.
- Batted: Right Threw: Right

MLB debut
- May 4, 1910, for the St. Louis Browns

Last MLB appearance
- August 5, 1910, for the St. Louis Browns

MLB statistics
- Batting average: .130
- Hits: 3
- Runs batted in: 1
- Stats at Baseball Reference

Teams
- St. Louis Browns (1910)

Fletcher Manson "Sled" Allen (August 23, 1886 – October 16, 1959) was an American professional baseball catcher and manager. Allen was also a sports promoter after retiring from baseball. Allen played a total of nine seasons in professional baseball, including a part of one in Major League Baseball with the St. Louis Browns (1910). Over his major league career, Allen batted .130 with three hits in 14 games played. Allen also played in the minor leagues with the Class-C Enid Railroaders (1908–1909), the Class-A Louisville Colonels (1910) and the Class-B Houston Buffaloes (1912–1916). During his minor league career, Allen compiled a .210 batting average with 465 hits, 63 doubles, 15 triples and five home runs in 748 games. Allen was a manager in the minor leagues for the Class-B Houston Buffaloes (1911), the Class-D Ranger Nitros (1921), the Class-D Lubbock Hubbers (1923) and the Class-A Amarillo Texans (1928). Allen is the father of country music singer Terry Allen.

== Professional career ==
Allen with the St. Louis Browns in 1910.

=== Early career ===
In 1908, Allen began his professional baseball career with the Class-C Enid Railroaders of the Western Association. With the Railroaders that season, Allen batted .147 with 47 hits, five doubles, one triple and one home run in 109 games played. During the 1909 season, Allen continued playing for the Enid Railroaders. He batted .257 with 94 hits, 15 doubles, one triple and two home runs in 108 games.

=== St. Louis Browns ===
On September 1, 1909, Allen was drafted by the St. Louis Browns from the Enid Railroaders in Major League Baseball's Rule 5 draft. Allen made his major league debut on May 4, 1910. His final major league appearance was on August 5, 1910. During his time with the Browns, Allen batted .130 with three runs, three hits, one double and one walk in 14 games played. Allen played 12 total games on defense. Allen played all of his 12 games at the catcher position and spent a part of a game at first base. He committed three errors, and seven assists and made 21 putouts in 31 total chances. After leaving the Browns, Allen joined the minor league Class-A Louisville Colonels for the rest of the 1910 season. In 30 games with the Colonels, Allen batted .227 with 22 hits, one double and one triple.

=== Houston Buffaloes ===
Allen joined the Class-B Houston Buffaloes of the Texas League in 1911. That season, Allen was a player-manager, making it his debut as a manager in professional baseball. He batted .187 with 69 hits, 11 doubles, two triples and two home runs in 155 games that season. Allen also led the Buffaloes to a 71–75 record in 1911. In 1912, Allen continued his tenure with the Buffaloes as a player, but not a manager. In 92 games that season, Allen batted .243 with 75 hits, nine doubles and three triples. Allen continued playing with the Houston team in 1913 and batted .208 with 51 hits, one double and two triples in 80 games played. In 1914, Allen batted .218 with 48 hits, seven doubles and two triples in 68 games that season with Houston. Allen played 92 games with the Houston team in 1915. In those games, Allen batted .215 with 61 hits, 10 doubles and four triples. Allen spent hit final season as a professional baseball player in 1916. With Houston, Allen batted .185 with 28 hits and four doubles in 54 games played.

=== Managerial career ===
In 1921, Allen joined the Class-D Ranger Nitros of the West Texas League as a manager. At the helm of the Nitros, Allen led them to a 37–43 record. Allen was hired as the manager of the Class-D Lubbock Hubbers of the Panhandle-Pecos Valley League during their inaugural season in 1922. That season, the Hubbers went 79–59. In 1923, still at the helm of the Lubbock team, Allen led them to a league championship after they finished with a 57–47 record. In 1928, Allen was one of three managers who led the Class-A Amarillo Texans of the Western League.

== Later life ==
After his professional career, Allen was a sports promoter. Allen, who resided in Lubbock, Texas, in the 1940s, converted a church into a nightclub where he promoted boxing and wrestling events. Allen spent several years at the aforementioned nightclub before opening the "Sled Allen Arena". The arena was host to many events, including an interracial dancing event featuring Ray Charles in the 1950s. The "Cosmopolitan Dance" as it was called was an event that was aimed at bringing Hispanics, African-Americans and Caucasians together. Allen also promoted shows for Little Richard and Elvis Presley.

== Personal ==
Allen was born on August 23, 1886, in West Plains, Missouri. He is the father of country music singer Terry Allen. After his baseball career, Allen resided in Lubbock, Texas. Allen died in Lubbock on October 16, 1959, and was buried in City of Lubbock Cemetery. Allen's wife, Pauline, was a pianist.
