= Grover Seitz =

American baseball player and manager

Grover P. Seitz
- Born: Amarillo, Texas
- Occupation(s): Baseball player and manager
- Known for: Long and storied tenure in Minor League Baseball

Grover Pinckney Seitz (1907 – February 1, 1957) was a Minor League Baseball player well known for his long and storied tenure.

He played from 1929 to 1933, from 1939 to 1942, from 1945 to 1947 and in 1953, when he was 45 years old. He spent a large portion of his career in the West Texas–New Mexico League, where he served as a player-manager. Seven seasons he hit over .300, with a high of .395 with the Clovis Pioneers in 1942. Overall, he appeared in 1,148 games, hitting around .315.

He managed from 1939 to 1942 and from 1946 to 1956, skippering the Pampa Plainsmen (1939), Pampa Oilers (1940, 1946–1951, 1955–1956) and Clovis Pioneers (1941–1942, 1951–1954). He led his teams to 10 playoff appearances in his 15-year career, including three league championships. He also served as part-owner of the Pampa club.

He was known as "one of the most vivid personalities ever found in organized baseball." A colorful individual, local reporters called him the "wild bull of the Pampans."

He and his wife died in 1957 after colliding with a train while driving his vehicle.
