= Warren Sandel =

American baseball player

- Pitcher
- Born: May 16, 1921; St. Louis, Missouri, U.S.
- Died: June 12, 1993 (aged 72)
- Batted: Left Threw: Left

Minor League statistics
- Win–loss record: 87-76
- W-L%: .534
- Earned run average: 3.93
- Stats at Baseball Reference

Teams
- Albuquerque Cardinals (1939); Pocatello Cardinals (1939–1940); Sacramento Solons (1940); Fresno Cardinals (1941); Jacksonville Tars (1942); Jersey City Giants (1942); Spokane Indians (1942); Jersey City Giants (1946); Hollywood Stars (1946); Stockton Ports (1949); Los Angeles Angels (Pacific Coast League) (1949); Fresno Cardinals (1950–1951); Hollywood Stars (1952)

Warren Sandel (May 16, 1921 – June 12, 1993) was an American professional baseball player from 1938 to 1952. Most of his playing time was spent at the minor league level. A pitcher, Sandel is best remembered for giving up the first base hit to Jackie Robinson who broke professional baseball's color barrier in 1946 while playing under a minor league contract for the Brooklyn Dodgers.

== Professional career ==
Sandel signed a professional contract with the St. Louis Cardinals while he was in high school. He subsequently entered the minor leagues in 1938 as pitcher for the Albuquerque Cardinals, which at the time was a member of the Class D Arizona–Texas League. Sandel enjoyed success in his early years. In 1942 he was offered a contract by the Sacramento Solons of the AAA Pacific Coast League. Despite being offered a contract that paid him $350 a month, the most he had ever made, and being given a chance to play just one step below the major league level, Sandel was unable to pitch for Sacramento because like many other ball players of his era, his career was interrupted by World War II. Instead of pitching professionally, Sandel served in the Coast Guard from 1943 to 1945. For Sandel, the time was not wasted because the Coast Guard placed him on its San Diego baseball team, where he not only continued pitching but, with the help of fellow players and coaches, finally mastered the curveball.

After his release from military service, Sandel returned to professional baseball and was invited to the New York Giants' 1946 spring training camp. Sandel soon found himself at odds with Mel Ott the Giant's manager, primarily because of Sandel's failure to work hard and take the game seriously.

"I always wanted to have fun and was pretty much a comedian when I pitched. I did a lot of crazy things. One time I went up to bat without a bat ... I always wanted to have fun playing baseball [and] that got me into trouble with Mel Ott ... I knew I wasn't going to last long with him. [Once] Ott came out to the mound and said "When are you going to get serious? When I sent you out here I wanted you to work." I told him the only way I would work [was with] a rake and a shovel [because] I came out here to play ... I was in the minor leagues soon after that." – Interview with Rick Van Blair

Sandel spent the remainder of the 1946 season playing for the minor league Jersey City Giants. After the season was completed, he returned to California to play for the Hollywood Stars of the Pacific Coast League, which played a longer schedule than other baseball leagues. In 1947, Sandel was promoted to the major leagues and spent the next two seasons as relief pitcher for the New York Giants. Because relief pitchers were not used regularly in games back in the 1940s, Sandel was often rotated back to the Jersey City team during the season to keep his arm in shape.

== Jackie Robinson's first hit ==
Warren Sandel's contribution to baseball would have been largely lost to history if it was not for the fact that he gave up Jackie Robinson's first base hit as a professional player in 1946 when Robinson was a member of the Montreal Royals, a minor league team associated with the Brooklyn Dodgers. The hit occurred on April 18, 1946, opening day for both the Jersey City Giants and the Royals. Both teams were members of the AAA International League. The Jersey City stadium was filled to capacity by fans who were well aware that the game would feature the first black professional baseball player playing with, and against, a team of white players.

During Robinson's spring training with the Dodgers, he had been hit repeatedly by white pitchers when he stepped to the plate. Many expected the same to occur in Jersey City. But Sandel had played against Robinson, also a Californian, in baseball games on the west coast and harbored no ill feelings toward him. After the first several pitches were thrown and the count ran to 2–1, Dick Bouknight, the Giants catcher, walked to the mound and demanded to know if Sandell was going to throw at Robinson. Sandel refused. After running up a 3-2 count, Robinson ground out harmlessly to the shortstop.

Robinson's next at bat came in the third inning with two runners on base. After Sandel detected a sign that Robinson was likely to bunt, Sandel placed the ball over the plate and moved forward expecting to field the ball. But Robinson swung away and hit a line drive that easily cleared the left field wall resulting in his first professional base hit: a three-run home run.

For both professional baseball as well as society it was a historic moment when Robinson crossed the plate and reached out to the offered handshake of white teammate George Shuba. The event was captured in photos that have been frequently published over the years.

"When he crossed the plate, he was warmly greeted by his teammates. Suddenly, color was no longer important in the Montreal dugout. The cloud that had enveloped the Canadian team for two months suddenly vanished. Now it was only skill that counted."

== Looking back on his career ==
After Sandel was released by the Giants, he returned to the minor leagues and pitched in California until 1952 when he retired from baseball.

"I liked to say that I had a million dollar arm and a ten cent head. As I look back on my career I do regret that I wasn't more serious. I wish I had taken the game more serious because I know I could have done a lot better. But I do have the memories. A lot of guys I played with and against are now scouts for major league teams and we stay in touch from time to time. I made a lot of friends and had a lot of fun." - Interview with Rick Van Blair
