= Ranger Nitros =

Baseball team

The Ranger Nitros were a West Texas League baseball team based in Ranger, Texas, United States that existed from 1920 to 1922. Major league baseball players Tom Lovelace and Jim Galloway played for them (Galloway also managed them in 1920). In 1921, they were managed by Sled Allen. They played their home games at Nitro Park.

The Nitros were the only professional baseball team to ever come out of Ranger, Texas.
