= Charley Stis =

American baseball player, manager, scout, and umpire (1884-1979)

- Second baseman / Manager / Scout / Umpire
- Born: November 3, 1884
- Died: January 9, 1979 (aged 94); Festus, Missouri, U.S.
- Batted: Unknown Threw: Unknown

Charles C. Stis [Pepper] (November 3, 1884 – January 9, 1979) was an American baseball infielder, manager, scout and umpire.

Little is known about this man who spent more than six decades in professional baseball.

Stis began his baseball career as a Minor league second baseman in 1906, playing or managing for thirteen teams in nine different leagues through 1935.

Stis worked as an umpire in the minors and played with the St. Louis Terriers of the original Federal League in 1913. He also managed the Racine Belles of the All-American Girls Professional Baseball League for part of the 1945 season.

In addition, Stis scouted during 23 years for several Major League Baseball organizations, including the Boston Braves, Chicago White Sox, Detroit Tigers, Philadelphia Phillies, St. Louis Browns and St. Louis Cardinals.

Stis died in Festus, Missouri, at the age of 94. Nine years after his death, he became part of Women in Baseball, a permanent display at the Baseball Hall of Fame and Museum at Cooperstown, New York, which was unveiled in 1988 to honor the entire AAGPBL rather than individual baseball personalities.

== Career timeline ==
Year	Club	Level	Position
1906	Springfield Midgets; St. Joseph Packers/Hutchinson Salt Packers	WA	Second base
1907	Butte Miners; Seattle Siwashes	NWES	Second base
1908	Butte Miners	NWES	Second base
1910	Holyoke Papermakers; New Haven Prairie Hens	CSL	Second base
1911	Peoria Distillers	IIIL	Second base/Manager
1912	Peoria Distillers	IIIL	Second base/Manager
1913	St. Louis Terriers	FBL	Second base
1914	Regina Red Sox	WCAN	Second base
1915	Aberdeen Black Cats	NWES	Manager
1917	Fort Dodge Dodgers	CENA	Second base/Manager
1920	Mineral Wells Resorters	WTXL	Manager
1921	Springfield Midgets	WA	Manager
1935	Beatrice Blues	NESL	Manager
1945	Racine Belles	AAGPBL	Manager
