= Mineral Wells Resorters =

The Mineral Wells Resorters were a West Texas League (1920–1921) and Texas–Oklahoma League (1921) baseball team based in Mineral Wells, Texas, USA. In 1920, they were managed by Bill Burns and Charley Stis and had Bunny Roser on the team. In 1921, they began as the Resorters but moved to Ballinger, Texas to become the Ballinger Bearcats. After they moved to Ballinger, the Graham Highjackers team of the Texas–Oklahoma League moved to Mineral Wells, becoming the Mineral Wells Resorters.

They were the only professional baseball team to ever come out of Mineral Wells, Texas.
