= San Angelo Red Snappers =

The San Angelo Red Snappers were a West Texas League baseball team based in San Angelo, Texas, United States that played in 1928, winning the league championship that year under manager Red Snapp. The team became the San Angelo Sheep Herders in 1929.

In its only year of existence, the Snappers finished in first place and won the league championship.
