= Nitro Park =

Former baseball and football stadium in Ranger, Texas

Nitro Park was a baseball park located in Ranger, TX. It was the home of the Ranger Nitros in the West Texas League from 1920 to 1922. The field was also used for high school football. The venue was constructed during the economic boom of the early 1920s.
