= Stamford Colonels =

The Stamford Colonels were a West Texas League baseball team based in Stamford, Texas, United States that played in 1922. They are the only professional baseball team to ever come out of Stamford.

In their only year of existence, they went 56-76, finishing seventh in the league.
