= Coleman Bobcats =

Minor league baseball team

The Coleman Bobcats were a West Texas League baseball team based in Coleman, Texas, United States that played from 1928 to 1929. In 1929, they won the league championship under managers Honus Mitze and Jack Holloway. They are the only professional baseball team to ever come out of Coleman, Texas.

Notable players include Jo-Jo Moore and Fabian Kowalik.
