= Albuquerque Sports Stadium =

Former baseball stadium in New Mexico

Coordinates: 35.069494°N 106.629535°W

- Interactive map of Albuquerque Sports Stadium
- Location: 1340 University Boulevard SE; Albuquerque, NM 87106
- Owner: City of Albuquerque
- Operator: Albuquerque Dukes
- Capacity: 10,510
- Surface: Grass
- Field size: Left field: 360 feet Center field: 410 feet Right field: 340 feet

Construction
- Groundbreaking: 1968
- Opened: March 31, 1969
- Closed: 2000
- Demolished: 2001
- Cost: $1.4 million ($12.3 million in 2025 dollars)
- Architect: Max Flatow

Tenants
- Albuquerque Dodgers (TL) (1969–1971); Albuquerque Dukes (PCL) (1972–2000)

Albuquerque Sports Stadium was a baseball stadium in Albuquerque, New Mexico, USA, which was built in 1969 as a modern replacement for the aging Tingley Field. The ballpark had a seating capacity of 10,510, though it occasionally accommodated much larger crowds.

The stadium was located at the northeast corner of University Boulevard and Avenida Cesar Chavez. It was closed in 2000 and demolished in 2001 to make way for Isotopes Park, which occupies the old stadium's footprint.

== Design ==
Albuquerque Sports Stadium was built in a bowl excavated out of a large hill, so the playing field was significantly below grade level. The dimensions of the park were 360 feet to left field, 350 feet to right field, and 410 feet to center, approximately the same size as Tingley Field. The stadium was a fairly basic facility with a central concessions area, offices, and ticketing behind a single-level grandstand. One of the park's most unusual features was a "drive in" area in right field where fans could watch the game from their cars.

== History ==
Tingley Field had been the home of Albuquerque's professional baseball teams since the Depression, and it was starting to show its age by the 1960s. City officials hoped a large new stadium located near the other sports venues in southeast Albuquerque would have a major economic impact and help the city attract a Triple-A team in the near future. Support was widespread, and in a 1968 special election voters approved $1 million in bonds for the project. This included $100,000 for the renovation of Tingley Field, with the rest going towards the new stadium.

Albuquerque Sports Stadium was designed by Albuquerque architect Max Flatow and cost just $1.4 million. It opened on March 31, 1969, with an exhibition game between the San Francisco Giants and the Cleveland Indians played in front of an overflow crowd of 13,767. The first batter to step up to the plate in the new stadium was Willie Mays.

The ballpark's first tenants were the Albuquerque Dodgers of the Double-A Texas League. In 1972 the city succeeded in acquiring a Triple-A team, the Pacific Coast League Albuquerque Dukes. The Dukes remained at Albuquerque Sports Stadium for the next 28 years. The 1993 Triple-A All-Star Game was held at Albuquerque Sports Stadium, with the National League defeating the American League, 14–3. The attendance was 10,541, and the game was broadcast on radio. Albuquerque's Billy Ashley was selected as the PCL MVP.

By the late 1990s, however, the stadium had become the second oldest in the league and was in disrepair. Dukes owner Bob Lozinak sold the team franchise to Portland in 2000, and Albuquerque Sports Stadium was torn down shortly thereafter. Isotopes Park was built on the old stadium's footprint. Although initially billed as a renovation of Albuquerque Sports Stadium, Isotopes Park was built almost entirely from scratch; little of the old ballpark remains apart from the playing field.

Many Dodger greats, including much of the championship teams of the Dodgers from the 1970s skippered by Tommy Lasorda played at the Albuquerque Sports Stadium, including Orel Hershiser, Pedro Martínez, Steve Garvey, Mike Piazza, and Paul Lo Duca.
