= Jack Farmer =

American baseball player (1892–1970)

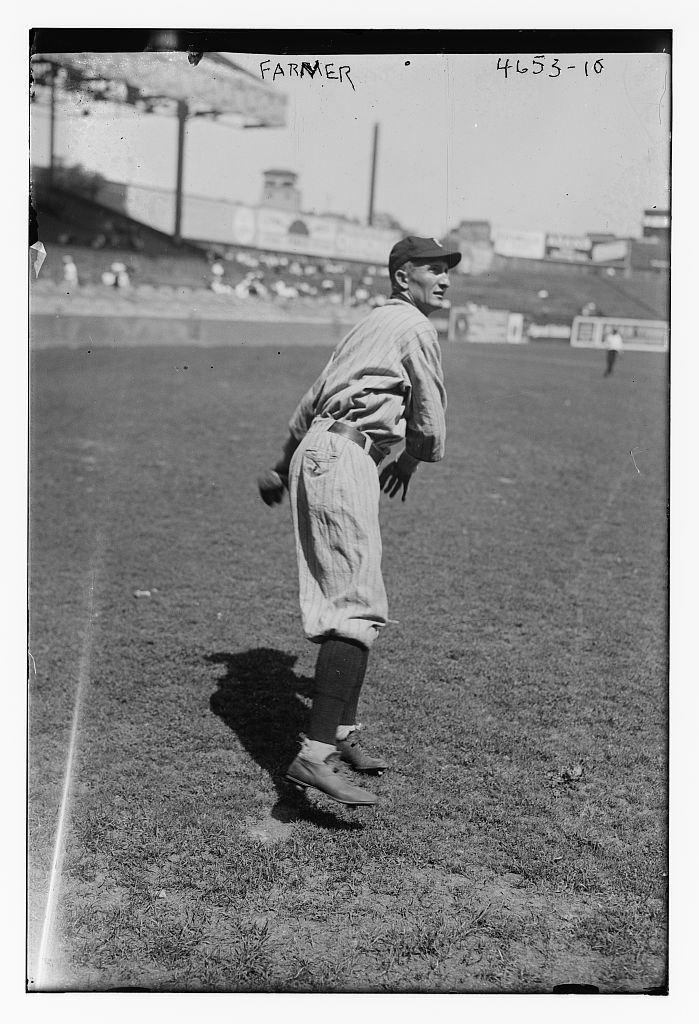
- Second baseman / Outfielder
- Born: July 14, 1892; Granville, Tennessee, U.S.
- Died: May 21, 1970 (aged 77); Columbia, Louisiana, U.S.
- Batted: Right Threw: Right

MLB debut
- July 8, 1916, for the Pittsburgh Pirates

Last MLB appearance
- August 4, 1918, for the Cleveland Indians

MLB statistics
- Batting average: .269
- Home runs: 0
- Runs batted in: 15
- Stats at Baseball Reference

Teams
- Pittsburgh Pirates (1916); Cleveland Indians (1918)

Floyd Haskell "Jack" Farmer (July 14, 1892 – May 21, 1970) was an American Major League Baseball second baseman who played for two seasons. He played for the Pittsburgh Pirates in 1916 and the Cleveland Indians in 1918. He attended Cumberland University in Lebanon, Tennessee.
