= Borger Gassers =

- 1939–1954; (1939–1942, 1946–1954); Borger, Texas

Minor league affiliations
- Class: Class C (1946–1954); Class D (1939–1942)
- League: West Texas–New Mexico League (1939–1954)

Minor league titles
- League titles (1): 1940

Team data
- Name: Borger Gassers (1939–1954)
- Ballpark: Huber Ball Park

The Borger Gassers were a minor league baseball team that operated in the West Texas–New Mexico League between 1939 and 1954 with a break from 1943 to 1945 due to World War II. The Borger Gassers disbanded on July 16, 1954.

== Players ==
=== Pitchers & Catchers ===
- (P) Howard Parks - 1939
- (C) Floyd Franklin Smith - 1939
- (P) Robert Fulton "Bob" Crues - 1940
- (C) Littleton Pierson Henry (Ish) - 1946
- (P) William Hair, 1947
- (P) Eddie Carnett, 1948–1952, 1948; batted .409 with 33 home runs and 161 RBIs; other years he batted over .300; from the mound 13-6 in 1950 and 10-6 in 1952
- (P) Robert Garrett, 1953
- (P) Claude Gerald "Lefty" Blair (dates unknown)

=== Infielders ===
- Verdun Gilchrist, 1946-1950; shortstop, second baseman
- Tommy Fox, 1946-1954; 3rd base; hit 4 home runs off of Bobby Lane, one of which went into the Huber swimming pool
- Luis Sanchez, 1951, shortstop

=== Outfielders ===
- Gordon Nell, .389-40-175 season in 1940; led the league in home runs and drove in over 160 runs five times

=== Unknown position ===
- Jim Cain
- Pat Lorenzo
- Leon Cato
- Frank Warren
- Stewart Williams
- Udell Moore
- William Scopetone
- Joseph Kilkuskie

== Owners ==
- Abe Latman
- Dr. Melvin C Kimball

== Managers ==
- F.K. Withers, 1939
- Pete Susko / Gordon Neil, 1940
- Gordon Nell, 1941
- Hugh Willingham, 1942
- Ted Clawitter, 1946
- Gordon Nell / Stu Williams, 1947
- Eddie Carnett, 1948
- Eddie Carnett / Kenneth Sears, 1949
- Mickey Burnett, 1950
- Eddie Carnett /Lloyd Brown, 1951
- Lloyd Brown, 1952
- Lloyd Brown / Herschel Martin, 1953
- Herschel Martin / Tommy Warren, 1954
