= Clovis Buzzers =

Minor league baseball team

The Clovis Buzzers were a West Texas League baseball team based in Clovis, New Mexico, United States that played in 1922. They played their home games at League Park. They were the only non-Texas based team to ever play in the West Texas League. In addition, they were the first professional baseball team to ever come out of Clovis, New Mexico.

The 1923 Clovis team was the Clovis Cubs who played one season, and it would be until 1938 when the Clovis Pioneers began play that minor league baseball returned to Clovis.

Managed by Dutch Wetzel, they finished third in the league with a 75-57 record.
