= Sammy Hale =

American baseball player (1896–1974)

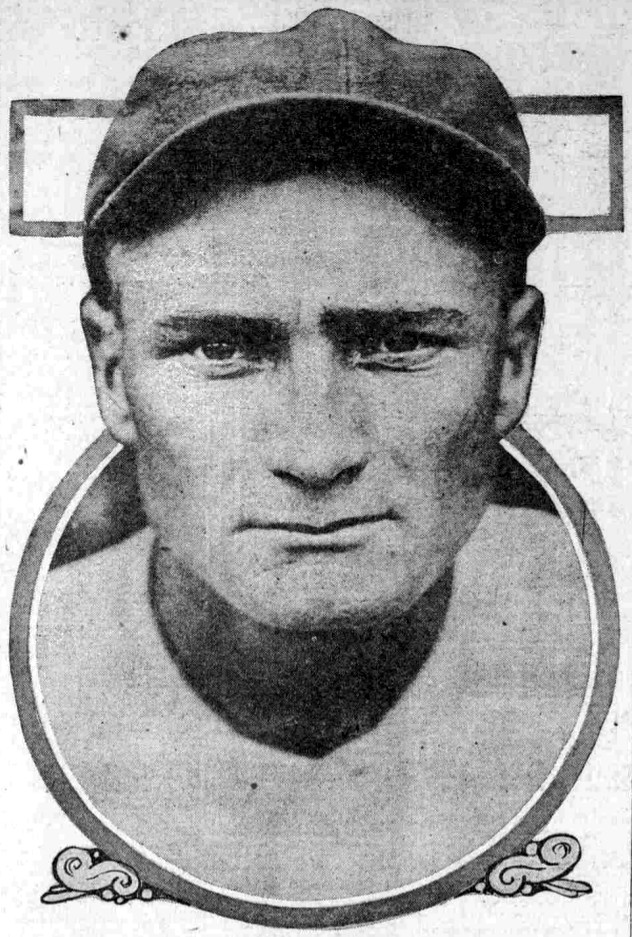
- Third baseman
- Born: September 10, 1896; Glen Rose, Texas, U.S.
- Died: September 6, 1974 (aged 77); Wheeler, Texas, U.S.
- Batted: Right Threw: Right

MLB debut
- April 20, 1920, for the Detroit Tigers

Last MLB appearance
- August 23, 1930, for the St. Louis Browns

MLB statistics
- Batting average: .302
- Home runs: 30
- Runs batted in: 393
- Stats at Baseball Reference

Teams
- Detroit Tigers (1920–1921); Philadelphia Athletics (1923–1929); St. Louis Browns (1930)

Samuel Douglas Hale (September 10, 1896 – September 6, 1974) was an American baseball player and manager. He played professional baseball from 1917 to 1941, including 10 years in Major League Baseball as a third baseman for the Detroit Tigers (1920–1921), Philadelphia Athletics (1923–1929), and St. Louis Browns (1930). Hale compiled a lifetime batting average of .302 with 30 home runs and 393 runs batted in and was a member of the Philadelphia Athletics team that won the 1929 World Series. He also served as a player-manager in the West Texas–New Mexico League with the Midland Cowboys (1939–1940), Pampa Oilers (1941), and Wichita Falls Spudders (1941).

== Early years ==
Hale was born in Glen Rose, the county seat of Somervell County, Texas, in 1896. He later moved to Estelline in the Texas Panhandle. Hale worked "picking cotton and stringing telephone wires" as a young man in Texas.

== Professional baseball ==
=== Muskogee and San Antonio ===
In April 1917, Hale began his professional baseball career with the Muskogee Reds of the Western Association. Less than one week after joining the club, Hale was nearly killed by an elevator in the Baltimore Hotel. The elevator began descending unexpectedly, "crushing Hale between the wall and the top of the car," leaving Hale hanging by his finger tips from the fifth floor landing. The impact tore the muscles above Hale's left knee and "mashed" the right leg below the knee "so that the skin rested against the bone." Hale went on to appear in 116 games, mostly at shortstop, for Muskogee. He hit 32 doubles, eight triples, 17 home runs, and compiled a .284 batting average.

In August 1917, Hale was "recalled" by the San Antonio Bronchos of the Texas League. He appeared in 235 games for the Bronchos between 1917 and 1919. In 1919, he compiled a .346 batting average and a .515 slugging percentage while playing at third base for the Bronchos.

=== Detroit Tigers ===
At the end of the 1919 season, the Bronchos sold Hale to the Detroit Tigers. Prior to reporting to spring practice with the Tigers in Macon, Georgia, Hale "had never been outside the Lone Star State before." Hale made his major league debut on April 20, 1920, and appeared in 76 games for the 1920 Tigers, mostly as a pinch-hitter but also in 16 games at third base and five games in center field. He compiled a .293 batting average, and he led the American League in 1920 in both pinch hits and at bats as a pinch hitter, tallying 17 hits in 52 pinch-hit at bats.

In 1921, following a change of managers in Detroit, and with Ty Cobb becoming the team's player-manager, Hale appeared in only nine games for the Tigers and was limited to two plate appearances with no hits. Published reports later claimed that Cobb disfavored Hale because he wore a small fielding glove. The story later evolved with reports that he had unusually small hands that handicapped him as a fielder. One report from 1923 noted:

"[S]ome gloom-bird circulated the report that Hale's hands were too small to enable him to field grounders cleanly. Sammy's fins were said to be second cousin to a humming bird's in point of minuteness, and grave doubts were expressed as to his chance to make the grade in big league company."

Bothered by the recurring reports, Hale later had his hands examined by a doctor who "pronounced his hands a trifle smaller than average, but not unusually undersized."

=== Portland Beavers ===
On May 20, 1921, Hale was waived by Detroit to the Portland Beavers in the Pacific Coast League. He remained with the Beavers for two years, compiling a .342 batting average in 1921 and .358 in 1922.

=== Philadelphia Athletics ===
On December 5, 1922, the Philadelphia Athletics purchased Hale from the Beavers in exchange for players and cash totaling $75,000. Hale spent seven seasons with Connie Mack's Athletics from 1923 to 1929, playing in at least 80 games every year and in over 110 games five times. Hale's best season was 1925, when he was among the American League leaders with a .345 batting average (10th), .540 slugging percentage (10th), and 11 triples (10th). He also had career highs with 49 extra base hits and 63 RBIs in 1925.

Hale was credited with 46 double plays in 1927 — the most in the American League among third basemen. He also led the league's third basemen with 20 errors in 1928. In 1925, Hale had a career-high 24 errors at third base for a .919 fielding percentage.

=== St. Louis Browns ===
On December 11, 1929, the Athletics traded Hale and $2,500 to the St. Louis Browns in exchange for Wally Schang. He appeared in 62 games for the Browns, 47 as a third baseman, and compiled a .274 batting average. He played his last major league game with the Browns on August 23, 1930.

=== Minor leagues ===
Hale continued to play in the minor leagues, including stints with the Portland Beavers (1930–1931), Indianapolis Indians (1932), Oklahoma City Indians (1934), and Tulsa Oilers (1933–1934).

In 1935, Hale was the player-manager for a team from Coltexo, an oil camp in the Texas Panhandle. He also served as a player-manager in the West Texas–New Mexico League with the Midland Cowboys (1939–1940), Pampa Oilers (1941), and Wichita Falls Spudders (1941). In 1940, at age 43, he appeared in 111 games for Midland and compiled a .357 batting average and a .917 fielding percentage as a third baseman. The Brownsville Herald that year opined: "Hale is popular with both players and fans and if good will can put him back up the ladder he's on his way."

== Family and later years ==
In September 1917, Hale married Alma Charlotte Richerson in Estelline, Texas. Hale reportedly accumulated a fortune during the 1920s only to lose it in the Wall Street Crash of 1929.

After retiring from baseball, Hale took up golf and worked as a professional or greens keeper in Phillips, Shamrock, Vernon, and Memphis, all located in or near the Texas Panhandle. In 1966, he was inducted into the Panhandle Sports Hall of Fame. In 1967, he moved to Wheeler, Texas, and his wife died there in 1970. Hale died four years after his wife, in 1974, at Parkview Hospital in Wheeler after a long illness. He was age 77.
