= West Texas League =

Baseball league

- Classification: Class D (1920–1922, 1928–1929)
- Sport: Minor League Baseball
- First season: 1920
- Folded: 1929
- President: Walter Morris (1920–1921); Gordon W. Northern (1922); Lloyd B. Thomas (1922); J. McCallister Stevenson (1928); E.E. Lowrie (1928); D.L. Snodgrass (1929)
- No. of teams: 17
- Country: United States of America
- Most titles: 1 Abilene Eagles (1920); Sweetwater Swatters (1921); Amarillo Gassers (1922); San Angelo Red Snappers (1928); Midland Colts (1929)
- Related competitions: Panhandle-Pecos Valley League

The West Texas League was a Class D level minor league baseball league that existed from 1920 to 1922 and from 1928 to 1929.

== 1920-1922 ==
The following teams played in 1920: Abilene Eagles, Ranger Nitros, Mineral Wells Resorters, Cisco Scouts, Gorman Buddies/Sweetwater Swatters and Eastland Judges.

The Abilene Eagles beat the Ranger Nitros in the playoffs to win the league championship.

For the 1921 season, the Swatters, Eagles, Resorters, Nitros and Scouts returned to the league. The Resorters moved to Ballinger to become the Ballinger Bearcats. The Cisco Scouts changed their name to the Cisco Orphans. The Eastland Judges left the league and a new team, the San Angelo Bronchos, joined. The Abilene Eagles won their second championship in a row, beating the Swatters.

There were multiple new teams in 1922: the Amarillo Gassers, Lubbock Hubbers, Clovis Buzzers and Stamford Colonels. No team represented Ballinger, Cisco or Mineral Wells. Amarillo won the league championship, beating the Buzzers.

The league ceased play following the 1922 season.

== 1928-1929 ==
The league began play again in 1928, lasting until 1929. The following teams played in 1928: San Angelo Red Snappers, Coleman Bobcats, Abilene Aces, Midland Colts, Lubbock Hubbers and Hamlin Pied Pipers/Big Spring Springers.

The Lubbock Hubbers were the only returning team from the 1922 season. The Red Snappers beat the Aces to take the league championship.

New teams for the 1929 season included the San Angelo Sheep Herders and Big Spring Cowboys. The Ballinger Bearcats returned to the league. Coleman won the league championship.

== Cities represented ==
- Abilene, TX: Abilene Eagles 1920–1922; Abilene Aces 1928–1929
- Amarillo, TX: Amarillo Gassers 1922
- Ballinger, TX: Ballinger Bearcats 1921, 1929
- Big Spring, TX: Big Spring Springers 1928; Big Spring Cowboys 1929
- Cisco, TX: Cisco Scouts 1920–1921
- Clovis, NM: Clovis Buzzers 1922
- Coleman, TX: Coleman Bobcats 1928–1929
- Eastland, TX: Eastland Judges 1920
- Gorman, TX: Gorman Buddies 1920
- Hamlin, TX: Hamlin Pied Pipers 1928
- Lubbock, TX: Lubbock Hubbers 1922, 1928
- Midland, TX: Midland Colts 1928–1929
- Mineral Wells, TX: Mineral Wells Resorters 1920–1921
- Ranger, TX: Ranger Nitros 1920–1922
- San Angelo, TX: San Angelo Bronchos 1921–1922; San Angelo Red Snappers 1928; San Angelo Sheep Herders 1929
- Stamford, TX: Stamford Colonels 1922
- Sweetwater, TX: Sweetwater Swatters 1920–1922

== Standings & statistics ==
1920 West Texas League schedule

Team Standings	W	L	PCT	GB	Managers
Abilene Eagles	70	50	.583	--	Bugs Young / Ed Kizziar
Ranger Nitros	66	60	.524	7.0	Jim Galloway
Mineral Wells Resorters	60	60	.500	10.0	Charley Stis / Bill Burns
Cisco Scouts	55	61	.474	13.0	Jack York / Tom Carson
Gorman Buddies / Sweetwater Swatters	51	58	.467	13.5	Bert Hise
Eastland Judges	54	67	.446	16.5	Jimmy Maloney

Gorman (36–44) moved to Sweetwater August 7, first home game August 15.
Playoff: Abilene 4 games, Ranger 3.

Player statistics
Player	Team	Stat	Tot	Player	Team	Stat	Tot
Jim Galloway	Ranger	BA	.341	Henry Meade	Mineral Wells	W	20
Charles Gressett	Gorm/Sweet	Runs	77	John Kolzelnick	Cisco	S0	200
Joe Bratcher	Cisco/East	Hits	126	Carl Hill	Abilene	PCT	.778 14–4
Jim Galloway	Ranger	HR	9				

1921 West Texas League schedule

Team Standings	W	L	PCT	GB	Managers
Sweetwater Swatters	72	55	.567	--	Pop-Boy Smith / Earl Fleharty
Abilene Eagles	70	57	.551	2.0	Grady White / Hub Northen
San Angelo Bronchos	69	59	.539	2.5	Luke Robinson
Mineral Wells Resorters / Ballinger Bearcats	57	72	.442	15.5	Roy Brashear / Vernon Brown / Albert Briscoe / Jim Flagg / Pop-Boy Smith
Ranger Nitros	37	43	.463	NA	Fletcher "Sled" Allen
Cisco Scouts	27	47	.365	NA	Joshua L. Billings / Jimmy Flagg

Mineral Wells moved to Ballinger May 20; Cisco disbanded July 6; Ranger disbanded July 9
Playoffs: Sweetwater defeated San Angelo in a one game playoff for the first half title
Finals: Abilene 4 games, Sweetwater 2.

Player statistics
Player	Team	Stat	Tot	Player	Team	Stat	Tot
Sam Langford	Min Wel/Bal	BA	.381	Murray Richburg	Sweetwater	W	31
Warwick Comstock	Abilene	Runs	93	Murray Richburg]	Sweetwater	S0	226
Sam Langford	Min Wel/Bal	Hits	166	Murray Richburg	Sweetwater	Pct	.721 31–12
Ed Conkrite	San Angelo	HR	17				

1922 West Texas League schedule

Team standings	W	L	PCT	GB	Managers
Amarillo Gassers	86	52	.623	--	Billy Smith / Jack Meanor
Lubbock Hubbers	79	56	.585	5.5	Sled Allen
Clovis Buzzers	75	57	.568	8.0	Dutch Wetzel
Sweetwater Swatters	62	72	.463	22.0	Pop-Boy Smith
Abilene Eagles	61	72	.459	22.5	Charles Anderson
San Angelo Bronchos	61	73	.455	23.0	Walt Alexander / Luke Robinson
Stamford Colonels	56	76	.424	27.0	Tom Price / Poston Baker
Ranger Nitros	56	78	.418	28.0	Bob Allen / Joe Clayton

Playoff: Amarillo 5 games, Clovis 1.

Player statistics
Player	Team	Stat	Tot	Player	Team	Stat	Tot
Tom Pyle	Ranger	BA	.377	F. J. Smith	Amarillo	W	21
John King	Lubbock/Abiline	Runs	116	F.J Smith	Amarillo	S0	223
Tom Pyle	Ranger	Hits	183	Jim Sewell	Clovis	PCT	.778 14–4
Sam Langford	Lubbock	HR	21				

1928 West Texas League schedule 1st half - 2nd half

Team standings	W	L	PCT	GB	Managers
San Angelo Red Snappers	69	47	.595	--	Red Snapp
Coleman Bobcats	67	49	.578	2.0	Bob Couchman
Abilene Aces	61	54	.530	7.5	Les Tullos / Carl Williams
Midland Colts	52	64	.448	17.0	Curley Maloney / Snipe Conley
Lubbock Hubbers	48	63	.432	18.5	Bennie Brownlow / Ray Hill
Hamlin Pied Pipers / Big Spring Springers	46	66	.411	21.0	Army Magness / Poston Baker / J.L. Thornton

Hamlin moved to Big Spring July 3.
Playoff: San Angelo 3 games, Abilene 2.

Player statistics
Player	Team	Stat	Tot	Player	Team	Stat	Tot
Bob Sanguinette	Midland	BA	.394	Jubilo Clements	San Angelo	W	20
Garland Orr	Abilene	Runs	121	J.H. "Hokey" Garcia	San Angelo	S0	178
Garland Orr	Abilene	Hits	171	Clarence Williams	San Angelo	PCT	.737 14–5
Bob Sanguinette	Midland	HR	35				

1929 West Texas League schedule

Team standings	W	L	PCT	GB	Attend	Managers
Midland Colts	67	52	.563	--	14,687	Kal Segrist, Sr. / John King
Coleman Bobcats	62	56	.525	4.5	12,922	Honus Mitze / Jack Holloway
Ballinger Bearcats	62	56	.525	4.5	17,632	Bill Bean / Ray Hill
San Angelo Sheep Herders	55	61	.474	10.5	15,288	Walt Alexander
Abilene Aces	55	64	.462	12.0	7,604	Carl Williams
Big Spring Cowboys	54	66	.450	13.5	15,288	Jim Payne / Ralph Rose / Nick Carter

Playoff: Coleman 3 games, Midland 3. Coleman won the title when Midland failed to appear for the seventh game.

Player statistics
Player	Team	Stat	Tot	Player	Team	Stat	Tot
Ed Kallina	Midland	BA	.433	Jimmie Parker	Ballinger	W	18
Julian Flowers	Midland	Runs	136	Gene Moore	Midland	S0	147
Ed Kallina	Midland	Hits	159	Tom Vaughn	Ballinger	ERA	2.11
Ed Kallina	Midland	HR	44	T. Baker	Midland	PCT	.867 13–2
