= Red Snapp =

American baseball player

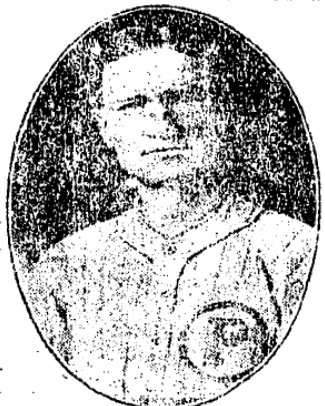
- Snapp, c. 1923, from The Sporting News
- Infielder / Manager
- Born: December 8, 1888; Stephenville, Texas, U.S.
- Died: January 3, 1974 (aged 85); Dallas, Texas, U.S.
- Stats at Baseball Reference

Earl Elmer "Red" Snapp (December 8, 1888 – January 3, 1974) was an American minor league baseball player and manager who led seven teams to pennants in their respective leagues.

== Early years ==
Snapp attended Texas Christian University, but left the school in 1908 to play professional baseball. He made his professional debut in 1909 for the Fort Worth Panthers in the Texas League. He was an infielder for Fort Worth until the middle of the 1912 season. After leaving Fort Worth, he played for the Houston Buffaloes. He then served as a player-manager for teams in Topeka, Kansas, Manhattan, Kansas, and York, Nebraska during the 1913 season.

In 1914, Snapp joined the Paris, Texas, team in the Texas–Oklahoma League. In 1915, he served as a player-manager for the Paris team, which was renamed the "Snappers" in his honor. During the 1916 season, he served as the player-manager of the Oklahoma City Senators in the same league.

An infielder, Snapp played from 1909 to 1916, appearing in more than 600 games. His best season was perhaps 1911, when he hit .255 with two home runs and 157 total bases for Fort Worth.

== First retirement from baseball ==
After the 1916 season, Snapp retired from baseball for five years. In June 1917, Snapp was living in Paris, Texas, working as a shoe salesman. At the time of the 1920 United States census, Snapp was still living in Paris and working as a salesman in a shoe store. He was living with his wife, Maude H. Snapp, and two daughters, ages six and two years. In November 1920, the Oklahoma City team tried to lure Snapp back to baseball. At the time, The Sporting News noted that, while coaching in the Western Association, Snapp had developed a reputation as "a smart manager, a strict disciplinarian," and someone who could also "give a good account of himself on the playing field."

== "King of the minors" in Texas ==
In 1921, Snapp rejoined the Paris Snappers and served as the team's president and manager for two years. He also played at second base for the Paris Snappers in 1921, but he was hit in the arm by a pitch early in the 1921 season, and a broken arm prevented him from playing for the remainder of the season. He led the team to two league titles in 1921 and 1922.

In December 1922, Snapp signed a contract to manage the Ardmore Proudecers team in the Texas–Oklahoma League during the 1923 season. In March 1923, The Galveston Daily News reported, "Earl Snapp seems to be carrying nearly the entire Paris personnel with him to Ardmore." In his first and only season at Ardmore, he led the team to the Western Association pennant, solidifying Snapp's reputation as one of the best baseball managers in Texas. The Sporting News profiled Snapp in April 1923 and noted:

"[H]is engagement is almost assurance of a pennant for the club that employs him. ... Whenever Snapp manages a team the nickname of that team immediately and invariably becomes the 'Snappers,' which is itself a tribute to the personality of the leader, for they don't name a ball club after a manager unless he has outstanding qualities."

In 1924, he moved to the Okmulgee Drillers in Oklahoma. While at Okmulgee, Snapp earned a reputation as one of the leading developers of baseball talent. In February 1925, The Sporting News published a profile on Snapp, noting that he had "the knack of digging up live, young fellows and then developing them."

In 1927, Snapp returned to Paris in the East Texas League and began acquiring new talent for his team. Snapp succeeded in leading his teams in Ardmore, Okmulgee and Paris to pennants in their Class D leagues.

In 1928, Snapp founded the West Texas League and became the manager, president, and co-owner of the team in San Angelo, Texas. Interviewed in January 1928, Snapp described the prospects for the new league: "Cities out there are in much better condition than they were in the days of the old West Texas League, and I believer the new West Texas League not only will be organized but also will be a big success." The San Angelo team, called the San Angelo Red Snappers, won the 1928 West Texas League pennant. In September 1928, The Sporting News wrote:

"They call him the king of the minors down in certain sections of Texas, and he has done a great deal to earn the title. ... Red Snapp might be called a one-man board of directors. He has often served as club president, secretary of whatnot while also acting in the role of manager, and the secrets of the bushes are known to him from start to finish. ... 'Where I go, pennants go,' is one of Red's expressions, and it isn't said in a boastful manner. He can back it up."

In 1929, Snapp concluded his managerial career at Sherman, Texas, with the Sherman Snappers.

He managed for ten seasons, skippering the Paris Red Snappers (1915), Oklahoma City Senators (1916), Paris Snappers (1921–1922, 1927), Ardmore Snappers (1923), Okmulgee Drillers (1925), Marshall Snappers (1926), Paris Bearcats (1926), San Angelo Red Snappers (1928) and Sherman Snappers (1929).

He led the Paris Snappers to a de facto Texas–Oklahoma League championship in 1922 (the team finished in first, there was no league championship series), the Ardmore Snappers to a Western Association championship in 1923 and the San Angelo Red Snappers to a West Texas League championship in 1928.

== Later years ==
After the 1929 season, Snapp retired from baseball to open a filling station in Dallas. At the time of the 1930 United States census, Snapp was living in Dallas with his wife, Maude, and their two daughters, Elizabeth and Mary Nell. His occupation was listed as the proprietor of a service station. Snapp also helped run a Dallas baseball school in the 1930s.
