= Abilene Aces =

The Abilene Aces were a West Texas League baseball team based in Abilene, Texas, United States that played from 1928 to 1929. They reached the league finals in 1928, ultimately losing the playoff. Notable players include Debs Garms and Euel Moore.
