= San Angelo Sheep Herders =

American baseball team

The San Angelo Sheep Herders were a West Texas League baseball team based in San Angelo, Texas, United States that played in 1929. They were the last team to play in San Angelo until the San Angelo Colts came about in 1948.

Notable players include Walt Alexander and Uel Eubanks.
