= Albuquerque Dukes =

- 1915–2000; (1915, 1942, 1946–1958, 1960–1964, 1972–2000); Albuquerque, New Mexico

Minor league affiliations
- Previous classes: Triple-A (1972–2000); Double-A (1962–1971); Class D (1960–1961); Class A (1956–1958); Class B (1955); Class C (1946–1954); Class D (1915), (1942)
- League: Pacific Coast League (1972–2000)
- Previous leagues: Texas League (1962–1971); Sophomore League (1960–1961); Western League (1956–1958); W. Texas-N. Mex. League (1942), (1946–1955); Rio Grande Association (1915)

Major league affiliations
- Previous teams: Los Angeles Dodgers (1963–2000); Kansas City Athletics (1960–1962); Cincinnati Reds (1958); New York Giants (1956)

Minor league titles
- League titles: 1949, 1950, 1953, 1965, 1967, 1970, 1972, 1978, 1980, 1981, 1982, 1987, 1990, 1994
- Division titles: 1965, 1970, 1972, 1974, 1978, 1980, 1981, 1982, 1983, 1987, 1989, 1990, 1994, 2000

Team data
- Previous names: Albuquerque Dukes (1946–64, 1972–2000); Albuquerque Dodgers (1965–71)
- Previous parks: Albuquerque Sports Stadium (1969–2000); Tingley Field (1946–1964)

The Albuquerque Dukes were a minor league baseball team based in Albuquerque, New Mexico.

== History ==
The first Dukes team was formed in 1915 as part of the Class D Rio Grande Association. The team finished in third place with a 32–25 record. Frank Huelman was the league leader in home runs, hitting 10 dingers for the season. These Dukes folded that same year.

Albuquerque was host to two other Class D minor-league teams (the Dons and the Albuquerque Cardinals, the latter for which Tingley Field was built) before the Dukes returned in 1942, this time with the Class D West Texas–New Mexico League. The Dukes went 24–30, but withdrew from competition in June of that year. The league was silent from 1943 to 1945 due to World War II, but play resumed in 1946 with the Dukes returning to the league, which was reclassified as Class C. In 1955 the West Texas–New Mexico League stepped up one more level, to Class B.

In 1956 the Dukes began play in the Class A Western League as an affiliate of the New York Giants (now San Francisco Giants). In 1958 they switched to being the Cincinnati Reds affiliate, but the Western League folded at the end of the season. The Dukes returned to Albuquerque in 1960, playing as an affiliate for the Kansas City Athletics (now Oakland Athletics) in the Class D Sophomore League.

=== Double-A ===
In 1962 Kansas City management moved the team to the Double-A Texas League, but dropped the team at the end of the season. The Los Angeles Dodgers began what would be a 47-year relationship with the club in 1963, and changed the name to the Albuquerque Dodgers in 1965. In 1969, the team moved from Tingley Field to the Albuquerque Sports Stadium, a fully modern facility on the south edge of town, near the UNM area.

=== Triple-A ===
In 1972, the Dukes name was revived and the team moved up to the Triple-A Pacific Coast League. The Dodgers transferred the Spokane Indians to Albuquerque after the 1971 season. Ironically, that franchise was a charter member of the PCL in 1903 as the original Los Angeles Angels, who had been displaced by the Dodgers in 1958 to spend the next 14 years in Spokane.

With future Dodgers manager Tommy Lasorda at the helm, the Dukes amassed a 92–58 record and won the PCL championship, the first of eight for the franchise. That 1972 team, featuring future big leaguers Charlie Hough, Davey Lopes, Ron Cey, Larry Hisle, Tom Paciorek, and Von Joshua (among others). Much of that team, including Lasorda, helped the Dodgers win pennants in 1977, 1978 and 1981, and a World Series in 1981.

The 1981 club, powered by sluggers Mike Marshall and Candy Maldonado and managed by Del Crandall, was also a dominant team, winning both halves of the South Division with a 94–38 record and sweeping the Tacoma Rainiers to win their third league title. Their .712 winning percentage was the second-best in PCL history at the time. The 1981 Dukes were recognized as the eleventh best minor league baseball team of all time, and the only team in the top 20 to play after 1943. During that season, KTLA, a Los Angeles-area television station, broadcast several games live from Albuquerque Sports Stadium during the players' strike that disrupted the season. The station even brought along Don Drysdale to be the announcer. In addition, when the 1981 players strike ended, the Dukes played an exhibition game against the Dodgers at Dodger stadium as a tune-up for the Dodgers, the Dukes won the game, 1–0. The game was televised in Albuquerque on KNAT-TV23.

In the early 1990s, future stars such as Mike Piazza, Pedro Martínez, John Wetteland, Raúl Mondesí, Paul Konerko, and many more came through on their way to 'The Show.' The team won PCL titles in 1990 and 1994, and posted the PCL's best overall record in 1991.

By then, however, the Dukes were growing dissatisfied with their longtime home, Albuquerque Sports Stadium. It was the oldest facility in the PCL, and was increasingly in disrepair. In 2000, the Lozinak family, absentee owners who resided in Maryland, sold the franchise to an interest group in Portland, Oregon. Following that season, the Dukes were moved to become the third incarnation of the Portland Beavers. The Dodgers traded Triple-A franchises with the San Diego Padres, whose affiliate, the Las Vegas Stars, had begun as the first incarnation of the Beavers. San Diego took over the Beavers/Dukes, and Los Angeles took Las Vegas, renaming the team the Las Vegas 51s for the famed alleged UFO spaceport, Area 51, near Las Vegas.

== Team name and logo ==
The Dukes' logo depicted a smiling cartoon version of a Spanish conquistador. That, and the team name reflecting Spanish nobility, likely reflect New Mexico's history as the earliest center of Spanish colonization in the present-day United States. It is generally believed that the city of Albuquerque was named in honor of Don Francisco Fernández de la Cueva, viceroy of New Spain from 1653 to 1660. One of de la Cueva's aristocratic titles was Duke of Alburquerque, referring to the Spanish town of Alburquerque. Thus, the moniker "Dukes" commemorated the original Duke of Alburquerque, for whom the city of Albuquerque is named.

== Notable players ==
Among the well-known players to have served with the Dukes are Mike Piazza, Paul Konerko, Pedro Martínez, Orel Hershiser, Kirk Gibson (on major league rehab assignment), Mike Marshall, John Wetteland, Darryl Strawberry (on major league rehab assignment), Eric Karros, Mike Maddux, Raúl Mondesí, Chan Ho Park, Mike Scioscia, Dave Stewart, Rick Sutcliffe, Fernando Valenzuela, José Vizcaíno, Sid Bream, Rick Rhoden, Steve Sax, Greg Gagne, Eric Young, Mickey Hatcher, Tim Wallach (on major league rehab assignment), Davey Lopes, Steve Yeager, Tom Paciorek, José Offerman, Larry Hisle, Éric Gagné, Todd Hollandsworth, and Paul Lo Duca. One of the most popular players in Dukes history was Brian Traxler, who only played 14 games in the major leagues. In 1954, Albuquerque native and future United States Senator Peter V. Domenici earned an education degree at New Mexico State University and signed on with the Dukes for whom he pitched for one year.

Among the managers of the Dukes were Lasorda, Del Crandall, Bill Russell, Kevin Kennedy, Rick Dempsey, Terry Collins and Mike Scioscia.

== Replacement ==
When the Dukes left Albuquerque in 2000, no replacement team had been found. In 2003, the Calgary Cannons were moved to Albuquerque as the Albuquerque Isotopes, a Triple-A affiliate of the Florida Marlins at the time. In 2009, the Isotopes became an affiliate of the Los Angeles Dodgers, reuniting Albuquerque's relationship with the Dodgers from 2009 until 2014. Since 2015, they have been the Triple-A affiliate of the Colorado Rockies.

The Isotopes play at Isotopes Park, the completely renovated stadium that now stands at the site of the Dukes former home field, Albuquerque Sports Stadium. This award-winning stadium opened in 2003 and is shared with the University of New Mexico Lobos baseball team, hosting approximately 100 home games each year, as well as New Mexico United soccer team.
