= San Angelo Bronchos =

Former West Texas League baseball team

The San Angelo Bronchos were a West Texas League baseball team based in San Angelo, Texas, United States that played in 1921 and 1922. They were the first professional baseball team to ever come out of San Angelo, Texas.

In 1921, they went 69-59, finishing third in the league. They finished sixth in the league in 1922.
