= Midland Colts =

Texas minor league baseball team

The Midland Colts were a West Texas League baseball team based in Midland, Texas, United States that played from 1928 to 1929. They were the first of many professional baseball teams to come out of Midland, Texas.

Notable players include Bob Boken and Gene Moore.
