= Pete Susko =

American baseball player (1904-1978)

- First baseman
- Born: July 2, 1904; Laura, Ohio, U.S.
- Died: May 22, 1978 (aged 73); Jacksonville, Florida, U.S.
- Batted: Left Threw: Left

MLB debut
- August 1, 1934, for the Washington Senators

Last MLB appearance
- September 30, 1934, for the Washington Senators

MLB statistics
- Batting average: .286
- Home runs: 2
- Runs batted in: 25
- Stats at Baseball Reference

Teams
- Washington Senators (1934)

Peter John Susko (July 2, 1904 – May 22, 1978) was an American professional baseball player. He was a first baseman for one season (1934) with the Washington Senators. For his career, he compiled a .286 batting average and two home runs in 224 at-bats, with 25 runs batted in.

He was born in Laura, Ohio and died in Jacksonville, Florida at the age of 73.
