= Abilene Eagles =

The Abilene Eagles were a West Texas League minor league baseball team based in Abilene, Texas, United States. They existed from 1920 to 1922, winning the league championship in both 1920 and 1921 under managers Bugs Young and Ed Kizziar (1920) and Grady White and Hub Northen (1921). They finished in sixth place in 1922. The league folded following the 1922 season, and the Eagles followed suit.

Future major leaguer Fred Johnson played for the Eagles.
