= Lubbock Hubbers =

Texas minor league baseball team

The Lubbock Hubbers were a minor league baseball team based in Lubbock, Texas, USA that existed on-and-off from 1922 to 1956. They played in the West Texas League (1922, 1928), Panhandle-Pecos Valley League (1923), West Texas–New Mexico League (1938–1942, 1946–1955) and Big State League (1956). They were affiliated with the Chicago White Sox (1938–1941), Detroit Tigers (1946–1947), Denver Bears (1954) and Baltimore Orioles (1956).

Over the course of their existence, they won multiple league championships. Their first came in 1923 under manager Sled Allen. In 1938 and 1939, they won back-to-back championships under Hack Miller and Salty Parker, respectively. They won their final league championship in 1947 under manager Jackie Sullivan. The 1934 team was recognized as one of the 100 greatest minor league teams of all time.

The Hubbers were a proposed team for the 2013 season in the Pecos League.
