= Sam Langford (baseball) =

American baseball player (1900–1993)

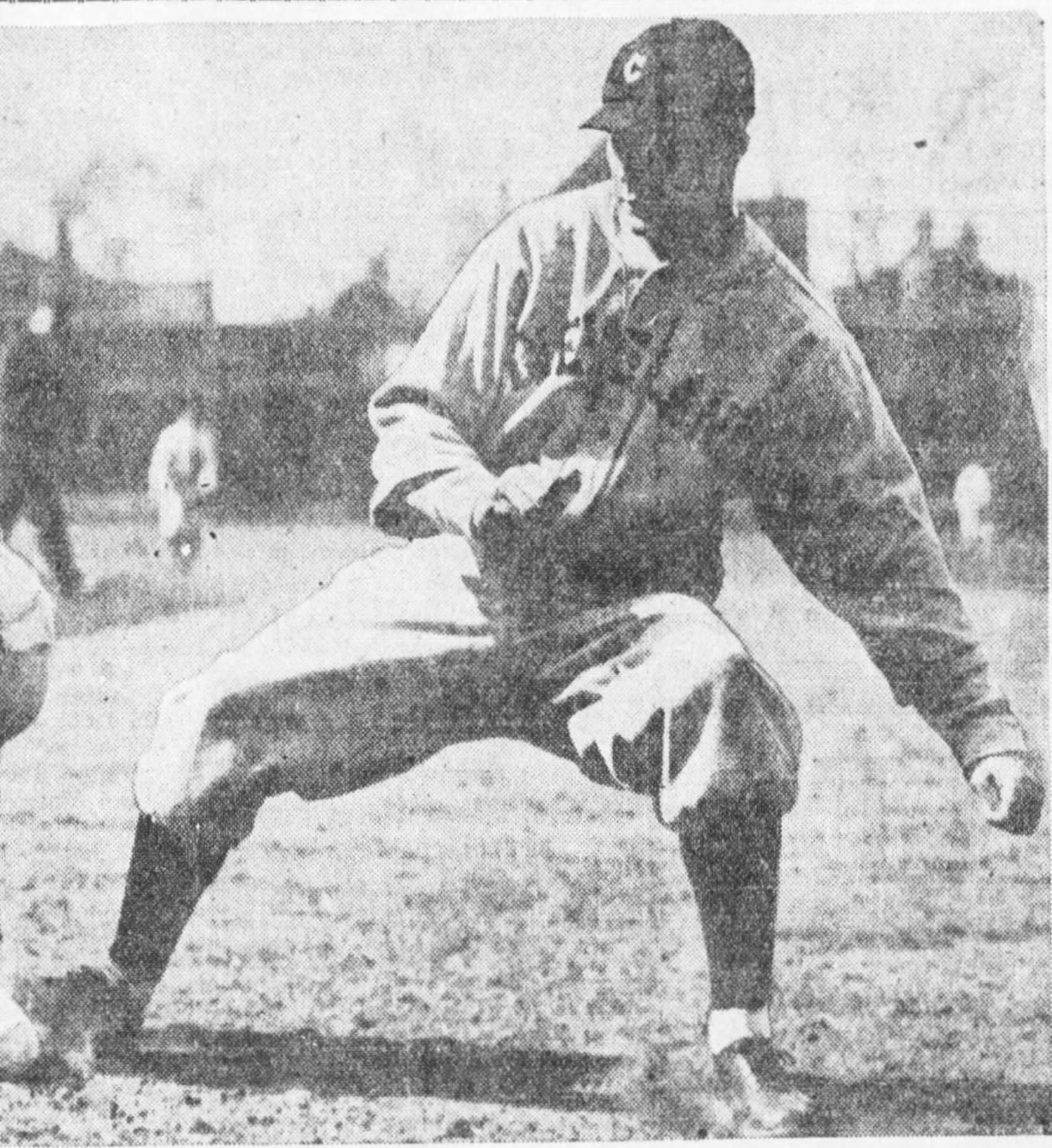
- Langford safe at first base during a 1928 game vs. the Tigers in Detroit
- Center fielder
- Born: May 21, 1900; Briggs, Texas, U.S.
- Died: July 31, 1993 (aged 93); Plainview, Texas, U.S.
- Batted: Left Threw: Right

MLB debut
- April 13, 1926, for the Boston Red Sox

Last MLB appearance
- September 21, 1928, for the Cleveland Indians

MLB statistics
- Batting average: .275
- Hits: 136
- RBI: 57
- Stats at Baseball Reference

Teams
- Boston Red Sox (1926); Cleveland Indians (1927–1928)

Elton "Sam" Langford (May 21, 1900 – July 31, 1993) was an American Major League Baseball center fielder who played three seasons of professional baseball for the Boston Red Sox and the Cleveland Indians.
