= Clovis Pioneers =

- (1922-1923, 1938-1942, 1946-1957); Clovis, New Mexico

Minor league affiliations
- Previous classes: Class-D (1922-1923, 1938-1942); Class-B (1955–1957); Class-C (1946-1954)
- Previous leagues: Southwestern League (1956–1957); West Texas-New Mexico League (1938-1942, 1946-1955); Panhandle-Pecos Valley League (1923); West Texas League (1922)

Major league affiliations
- Previous teams: Cleveland Indians (1946); Chicago Cubs (1950-1951); Cincinnati Reds (1956-1957)

Minor league titles
- League titles: 0

Team data
- Name: Pioneers (1938-1942, 1946-1956)
- Previous names: Clovis Redlegs (1957); Clovis Cubs (1923); Clovis Buzzers (1922)
- Previous parks: League Park, Calvary Park/Bell Park

The Clovis Pioneers was the primary name of the minor league baseball team that played in Clovis, New Mexico in various seasons from 1922 to 1957. The team was an affiliate of the Cleveland Indians (1946), Chicago Cubs (1950-1951) and Cincinnati Reds (1956-1957).

== History ==
Minor league baseball in Clovis began in 1922 and 1923 as the Clovis Buzzers and Cubs played in the Panhandle-Pecos Valley League and the West Texas League. Clovis was the first non-Texas team to play in the West Texas League.

After a 15 year hiatus, the Clovis Pioneers played in the West Texas–New Mexico League (1938-1942, 1946-1955) and in the Southwestern League (1956). They were affiliated with the Cleveland Indians in 1946, the Chicago Cubs in 1950 and 1951 and the Cincinnati Reds in 1956.

The final season was 1957 as the Clovis Redlegs disbanded on June 16 with a record of 36-12.

In 2011, a new Clovis Pioneers team was proposed as member of the Pecos League, an independent baseball league.

== Dean Brothers ==
Legendary baseball brothers Paul "Daffy" Dean and Baseball Hall of Fame member Dizzy Dean co-owned the team in 1949-1950, with Paul serving as manager. Dizzy had a pinch-hitting appearance in a game on July 8, 1949.

== The ballparks ==
The 1922 and 1923 Clovis teams hosted home games at League Park, which was located on North Pile Street.

Later Clovis teams played at Bell Park, first called Calvary Park, with the name changed in 1938 to honor a local baseball supporter who had died. Bell Park is still in use today by Clovis High School and is located at 610 Ash Street Clovis, New Mexico 88101.

== Notable alumni ==
=== Baseball Hall of Fame alumni ===
- Dizzy Dean (1949–50, owner) Inducted, 1953

=== Notable alumni ===
- Harry Bright (1950)
- Russ Christopher (1938) MLB All-Star
- Paul Dean (1949-1950, MGR) MLB All-Star
- Jesse Gonder (1957)
- Glenn McQuillen (1956)
- Tex Shirley (1940)
