= Pampa Oilers =

The Pampa Oilers were a West Texas–New Mexico League (1940–1942, 1946–1955) and Southwestern League (1956–1957) minor league baseball team based in Pampa, Texas, USA. They were affiliated with the Oklahoma City Indians in 1953 and 1954.

They won league championships in 1946, 1954 and 1955, under managers Grover Seitz, Hersh Martin and Seitz, respectively.

Notable players and managers include Sammy Hale, George Milstead, Warren Hacker, John Bottarini, Luis Suarez, Ted Pawelek, Tommy Thompson Lou Johnson, and Deck Woldt.

They were the only minor league team to ever come out of Pampa.
