= Pop-Boy Smith =

American baseball player (1892–1924)

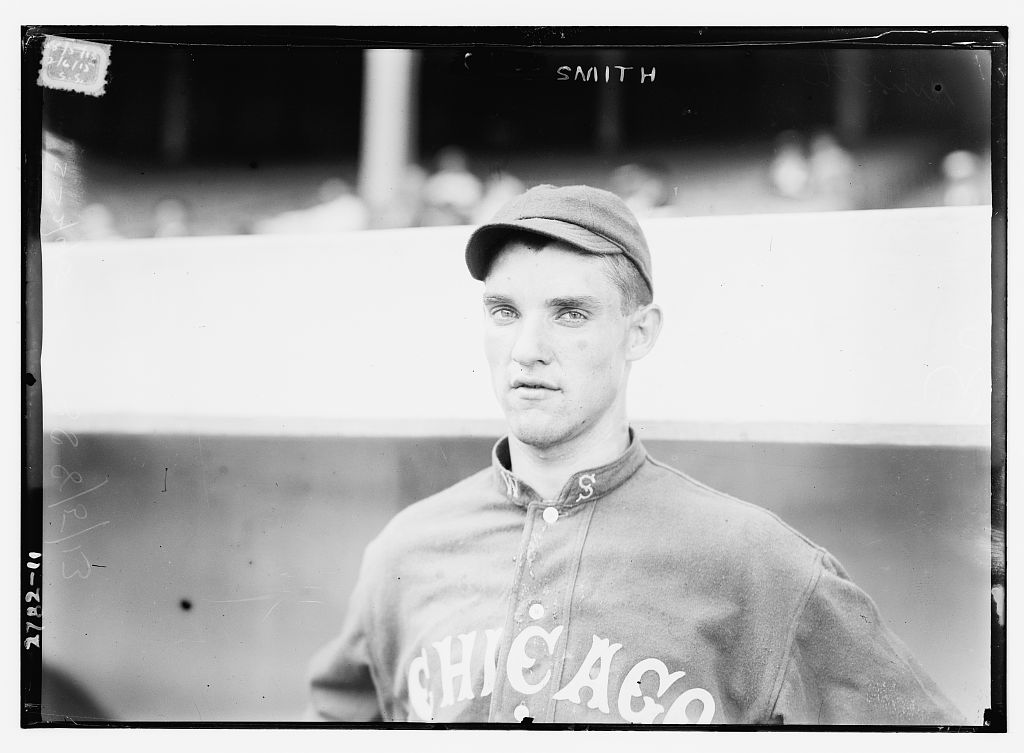
- Pitcher
- Born: May 23, 1892; Newport, Tennessee, U.S.
- Died: February 16, 1924 (aged 31); Sweetwater, Texas, U.S.
- Batted: Right Threw: Right

MLB debut
- April 19, 1913, for the Chicago White Sox

Last MLB appearance
- May 2, 1917, for the Cleveland Indians

MLB statistics
- Win–loss record: 1–4
- Earned run average: 4.21
- Strikeouts: 20
- Stats at Baseball Reference

Teams
- Chicago White Sox (1913); Cleveland Indians (1916–1917)

Clarence Ossie "Pop-Boy" Smith (May 23, 1892 – February 16, 1924) was an American Major League Baseball pitcher who played for three seasons. He played for the Chicago White Sox in 1913 and the Cleveland Indians from 1916 to 1917.
