= Joe Bratcher =

American baseball player (1898–1977)

- Outfielder
- Born: July 22, 1898; Grand Saline, Texas, U.S.
- Died: October 13, 1977 (aged 79); Fort Worth, Texas, U.S.
- Batted: Left Threw: Right

MLB debut
- August 26, 1924, for the St. Louis Cardinals

Last MLB appearance
- August 29, 1924, for the St. Louis Cardinals

MLB statistics
- Games played: 4
- At bats: 1
- Hits: 0
- Stats at Baseball Reference

Teams
- St. Louis Cardinals (1924)

Joe Warlick Bratcher Sr. (July 22, 1898 – October 13, 1977), nicknamed "Goobers", was an American outfielder in Major League Baseball. He played for the St. Louis Cardinals in 1924.
