= West Texas–New Mexico League =

- Most recent season or competition: 1955 West Texas-New Mexico League
- Classification: Class D (1937–1942); Class C (1946–1954); Class B (1955)
- Sport: Minor League Baseball
- First season: 1937
- Folded: 1955
- President: Milton Price (1937–1942, 1946–1951); Ray Winkler (1952); Hal Sayles (1953–1955)
- No. of teams: 18
- Country: United States of America
- Most titles: 3 Lubbock Hubbers (1938, 1939, 1947); Albuquerque Dukes (1949, 1950, 1953); Pampa Oilers (1946, 1954, 1955)
- Related competitions: Western League; Southwestern League; Big State League

The West Texas–New Mexico League was a minor league baseball league that operated from 1937 through 1955, with a hiatus from 1943 to 1945 during World War II. The league started as a Class D level league, upgraded to Class C in 1946 and then a final advancement to Class B level status in 1955. League franchises were based exclusively in New Mexico and Texas.

== History ==
The West Texas–New Mexico League began play in 1937 as a Class D level league, with Milton Price serving as president. The Hobbs Drillers, Midland Cardinals, Monahans Trojans, Odessa Oilers, Roswell Sunshiners and Wink Spudders were the charter members in beginning league play on May 4, 1937.

The Lubbock Hubbers (1938, 1939, 1947), Albuquerque Dukes (1949, 1950, 1953) and Pampa Oilers (1946, 1954, 1955) each won three league championships.

== Cities represented ==
- Abilene, Texas: Abilene Apaches 1939; Abilene Blue Sox 1946–1955
- Albuquerque, New Mexico: Albuquerque Dukes 1942, 1946–1955, moved to Western League 1956–1958
- Amarillo, Texas: Amarillo Gold Sox 1939–1942; Amarillo Gold Sox 1946–1955, moved to Western League 1956–1958
- Big Spring, Texas: Big Spring Barons 1938–1940; Big Spring Bombers 1941; Big Spring Pirates 1942
- Borger, Texas: Borger Gassers 1939–1942, 1946–1954
- Clovis, New Mexico: Clovis Pioneers 1938–1942, 1946–1955, moved to Southwestern League 1956
- El Paso, Texas: El Paso Texans 1955, moved to Southwestern League 1956–1957, moved from Arizona–Texas League 1952–1954
- Hobbs, New Mexico: Hobbs Drillers 1937; Hobbs Boosters 1938
- Lamesa, Texas: Lamesa Lobos 1939–1941; Lamesa Dodgers1942; Lamesa Lobos 1946–1952
- Lubbock, Texas: Lubbock Hubbers 1938–1942, 1946–1955, moved to Big State League 1956–1958
- Midland, Texas: Midland Cardinals 1937–1938; Midland Cowboys 1939–1940
- Monahans, Texas: Monahans Trojans 1937
- Odessa, Texas: Odessa Oilers 1937, 1940
- Pampa, Texas: Pampa Oilers 1939–1942, 1946–1955, moved to Southwestern League 1956–1957
- Plainview, Texas: Plainview Ponies 1953–1955, moved to Southwestern League 1956–1957
- Roswell, New Mexico: Roswell Sunshiners1937
- Wichita Falls, Texas: Wichita Falls Spudders 1941–1942
- Wink, Texas: Wink Spudders 1937–1938

== Standings & statistics ==
=== 1937 to 1942 ===
1937 West Texas–New Mexico League - schedule

Team standings	W	L	PCT	GB	Managers
Wink Spudders	68	50	.576	-	D.E. Perry / Joe Tate
Roswell Sunshiners	55	62	.470	12½	Neal Rabe
Monahans Trojans	55	64	.462	13½	Paul Trammel / Charles Bryan
Hobbs Drillers	45	74	.378	23½	Ned Pettigrew / Fincher Withers
Odessa Oilers	28	17	.622	NA	Charles Bryan
Midland Cardinals	41	25	.621	NA	Wray Query / Joe Davis

Odessa withdrew June 17; Midland withdrew July 9.
Playoffs: Wink 3 games, Hobbs 0: Roswell 3 games, Monahans 2;
Finals: Wink 3 games, Roswell 0.

Player statistics
Player	Team	Stat	Tot	Player	Team	Stat	Tot
Robert Hood	Wink	BA	.372	Red Hay	Wink	W	18
Robert Hood	Wink	Runs	137	Marshall Scott	Roswell	W	18
Mel Reist	Odes/Mona	Hits	182	Gene Devine	Roswell	SO	218
Robert Hood	Wink	RBI	145	Red Hay	Wink	ERA	3.97
Robert Hood	Wink	HR	30	Marshall Scott	Roswell	PCT	.750 18-6

1938 West Texas–New Mexico League - schedule

Team standings	W	L	PCT	GB	Managers
Lubbock Hubbers	80	49	.620	-	Hack Miller
Clovis Pioneers	71	58	.550	9	William Ratliff
Midland Cardinals	67	62	.519	13	Fincher Withers
Wink Spudders	63	65	.492	16½	Joe Tate
Big Spring Barons	58	71	.450	22	Charlie Barnabee
Hobbs Boosters	48	82	.369	32½	Neal Rabe

Playoffs: Lubbock 3 games, Wink 0: Clovis 3 games, Midland 1.
Finals: Lubbock 4 games, Clovis 1.
Total league attendance, 108,342

Player statistics
Player	Team	Stat	Tot	Player	Team	Stat	Tot
Cecil Smyly	Hobbs	BA	.367	Ernest Nelson	Clovis	W	20
Cecil Smyly	Hobbs	Runs	182	Jerry Blanchard	Lubbock	SO	265
Cecil Smyly	Hobbs	Hits	194	Red Roberts	Wink	ERA	3.08
Mal Stevens	Lubbock	RBI	132	George Bryan	Lubbock	PCT	.688 11-5
Mal Stevens	Lubbock	HR	31				
Jake Suytar	Midland	HR	31				

1939 West Texas–New Mexico League - schedule

Team standings	W	L	PCT	GB	Managers
Lubbock Hubbers	90	48	.652	-	Salty Parker
Pampa Oilers	78	59	.569	11½	Grover Seitz
Big Spring Barons	74	64	.536	16	Tony Rego
Lamesa Lobos	65	73	.471	25	Joe Tate
Midland Cowboys	62	75	.453	27½	Jimmy Kerr/ Charley Smith / Joe Piet
Clovis Pioneers	60	73	.451	27½	Dick Ratliff
Abilene Apaches / Borger Gassers	61	76	.445	28½	Fincher Withers / Charles Bryan
Amarillo Gold Sox	57	79	.419	32	Neal Rabe

Total league attendance, 273,374
Abilene moved to Borger July 9.
Playoffs: Lubbock 3 games, Big Spring 0: Pampa 3 games, Lamesa 2.
Finals: Lubbock 4 games, Pampa 1.

Player statistics
Player	Team	Stat	Tot	Player	Team	Stat	Tot
Gordon Nell	Pampa	BA	.392	Jodie Marek	Big Spring	W	23
Gordon Nell	Pampa	Runs	152	Howard Parks	Abil/Borg	SO	202
Gordon Nell	Pampa	Hits	207	Lee Harris	Lubbock	ERA	2.97
Gordon Nell	Pampa	RBI	189	Lee Harris	Lubbock	PCT	.818 18-4
Gordon Nell	Pampa	HR	44				

1940 West Texas–New Mexico League - schedule

Team standings	W	L	PCT	GB	Managers
Pampa Oilers	83	56	.601	-	Grover Seitz
Amarillo Gold Sox	82	58	.586	1½	Claude Jonnard
Lubbock Hubbers	81	59	.579	2½	Charlie Engle
Borger Gassers	79	60	.568	4	Pete Susko / Gordon Nell
Lamesa Lobos	71	69	.507	12½	Joe Tate
Midland Cowboys	59	81	.421	24½	Sammy Hale
Clovis Pioneers	58	80	.420	24½	Howard Taylor
Big Spring Barons / Odessa Oilers	45	95	.321	38½	Tony Rego / Stanley Bolton

Total league attendance, 240,679
Big Spring moved to Odessa June 20.
Playoffs: Borger 3 games, Pampa 0: Lubbock 3 games, Amarillo 0.
Finals: Borger 4 games, Lubbock 3.

Player statistics
Player	Team	Stat	Tot	Player	Team	Stat	Tot
Edwin Schweda	Lubbock	BA	.422	Rex Dilbeck	Pampa	W	23
Grover Seitz	Pampa	Runs	163	Willie Ramsdell	Big Spring/Odessa	W	23
William Scopetone	Big Spring/Borger	Hits	217	Russell Crider	Amarillo	SO	266
Gordon Nell	Borger	RBI	175	Pat Ralsh	Lubbock	ERA	3.25
Gordon Nell	Borger	HR	40	Pat Ralsh	Lubbock	PCT	.833 20-4

1941 West Texas–New Mexico League - schedule

Team standings	W	L	PCT	GB	Managers
Big Spring Bombers	91	45	.669	-	Joe Tate
Borger Gassers	89	47	.654	2	Gordon Nell
Clovis Pioneers	76	58	.567	14	Howard Taylor / Grover Seitz
Amarillo Gold Sox	72	64	.529	19	Claude Jonnard
Lubbock Hubbers	61	78	.439	31½	Charlie Engle
Lamesa Lobos	59	80	.424	33½	Sam Scaling
Pampa Oilers	55	79	.410	35	Dutch Prather / Sammy Hale
Wichita Falls Spudders	43	95	.312	49	Sammy Hale / Neal Rabe

Total Attendance, 183,395.
Playoffs: Big Spring 3 games, Amarillo 0: Clovis 3 games, Borger 2.
Finals: Clovis 4 games, Big Spring 3.

Player statistics
Player	Team	Stat	Tot	Player	Team	Stat	Tot
Frank Hargrove	Amarillo	BA	.388	Willie Ramsdell	Big Spring	W	25
James Haney	Big Spring	Runs	143	Russell Crider	Amarillo	SO	232
Stuart Williams	Borger	Hits	210	John McParland	Pampa	ERA	2.03
Dutch Prather	Pam/Ama	RBI	142	Udell Moore	Borger	PCT	.824 14-3
Gordon Nell	Borger	HR	28				

1942 West Texas–New Mexico League - schedule

Team standings	W	L	PCT	GB	Managers
Clovis Pioneers	52	19	.732	-	Grover Seitz
Lamesa Dodgers	43	27	.614	8½	Joe Tate
Amarillo Gold Sox	38	29	.567	12	Claude Jonnard
Pampa Oilers	36	32	.529	14½	William Ratliff
Borger Gassers	33	39	.458	19½	Hugh Willingham
Lubbock Hubbers	30	42	.417	22½	Monty Stratton
Albuquerque Dukes	25	30	.455	NA	Dixie Howell / E. Miller
Wichita Falls Spudders / Big Spring Pirates	8	47	.145	NA	George Milstead

Wichita Falls moved to Big Spring May 22. Big Spring withdrew June 20.; Albuquerque withdrew June 23.
League disbanded July 25.

Player statistics
Player	Team	Stat	Tot	Player	Team	Stat	Tot
Frank Warren	Borger	BA	.402	Kenneth Wyatt	Clovis	W	17
Leroy Koenig	Lubbock	Runs	88	Kenneth Wyatt	Clovis	SO	129
Vincent Castino	Lubbock	Hits	106	Kenneth Wyatt	Clovis	ERA	2.09
Frank Hargrove	Amarillo	RBI	84	Kenneth Wyatt	Clovis	PCT	1.000 17-0
Frank Hargrove	Amarillo	HR	22				

== Sources ==
The Encyclopedia of Minor League Baseball, Second Edition.
