= 1966 in baseball =

The following are the baseball events of the year 1966 throughout the world.

== Champions ==
=== Major League Baseball ===
- World Series: Baltimore Orioles over Los Angeles Dodgers (4–0); Frank Robinson, MVP
- All-Star Game, July 12 at Busch Stadium: National League, 2–1 (10 innings); Brooks Robinson, MVP

=== Other champions ===
- College World Series: Ohio State
- Japan Series: Yomiuri Giants over Nankai Hawks (4–2)
- Little League World Series: Westbury American, Houston, Texas
- Senior League World Series: East Rochester, New York

== Awards and honors ==
- Baseball Hall of Fame
  - Ted Williams
  - Casey Stengel (manager)

Baseball Writers' Association of America Awards
| BBWAA Award | National League | American League |
|---|---|---|
| Rookie of the Year | Tommy Helms (CHC) | Tommie Agee (CWS) |
| Cy Young Award | Sandy Koufax (LAD) | — |
| Most Valuable Player | Roberto Clemente (PIT) | Frank Robinson (BAL) |
Gold Glove Awards
| Position | National League | American League |
| Pitcher | Bob Gibson (STL) | Jim Kaat (MIN) |
| Catcher | John Roseboro (LAD) | Bill Freehan (DET) |
| 1st Base | Bill White (PHI) | Joe Pepitone (NYY) |
| 2nd Base | Bill Mazeroski (PIT) | Bobby Knoop (CAL) |
| 3rd Base | Ron Santo (CHC) | Brooks Robinson (BAL) |
| Shortstop | Gene Alley (PIT) | Luis Aparicio (BAL) |
| Outfield | Roberto Clemente (PIT) | Tommie Agee (CWS) |
| Outfield | Curt Flood (STL) | Al Kaline (DET) |
| Outfield | Willie Mays (SF) | Tony Oliva (MIN) |

== Statistical leaders ==
Hall of Famer Sandy Koufax

| | American League | | National League | |
| Stat | Player | Total | Player | Total |
|---|---|---|---|---|
| AVG | Frank Robinson^{1} (BAL) | .316 | Matty Alou (PIT) | .342 |
| HR | Frank Robinson^{1} (BAL) | 49 | Hank Aaron (ATL) | 44 |
| RBI | Frank Robinson^{1} (BAL) | 122 | Hank Aaron (ATL) | 127 |
| W | Jim Kaat (MIN) | 25 | Sandy Koufax^{2} (LAD) | 27 |
| ERA | Gary Peters (CWS) | 1.98 | Sandy Koufax^{2} (LAD) | 1.73 |
| K | Sam McDowell (CLE) | 225 | Sandy Koufax^{2} (LAD) | 317 |

^{1} American League Triple Crown batting winner
^{2} Major league Triple Crown pitching winner

== Major league baseball final standings ==
=== American League final standings ===
American League
| Team | W | L | Pct. | GB | Home | Road |
|---|---|---|---|---|---|---|
| Baltimore Orioles | 97 | 63 | .606 | — | 48‍–‍31 | 49‍–‍32 |
| Minnesota Twins | 89 | 73 | .549 | 9 | 49‍–‍32 | 40‍–‍41 |
| Detroit Tigers | 88 | 74 | .543 | 10 | 42‍–‍39 | 46‍–‍35 |
| Chicago White Sox | 83 | 79 | .512 | 15 | 45‍–‍36 | 38‍–‍43 |
| Cleveland Indians | 81 | 81 | .500 | 17 | 41‍–‍40 | 40‍–‍41 |
| California Angels | 80 | 82 | .494 | 18 | 42‍–‍39 | 38‍–‍43 |
| Kansas City Athletics | 74 | 86 | .463 | 23 | 42‍–‍39 | 32‍–‍47 |
| Washington Senators | 71 | 88 | .447 | 25½ | 42‍–‍36 | 29‍–‍52 |
| Boston Red Sox | 72 | 90 | .444 | 26 | 40‍–‍41 | 32‍–‍49 |
| New York Yankees | 70 | 89 | .440 | 26½ | 35‍–‍46 | 35‍–‍43 |

Locations of teams for the 1966–1967 American League seasons
American League

=== National League final standings ===
National League
| Team | W | L | Pct. | GB | Home | Road |
|---|---|---|---|---|---|---|
| Los Angeles Dodgers | 95 | 67 | .586 | — | 53‍–‍28 | 42‍–‍39 |
| San Francisco Giants | 93 | 68 | .578 | 1½ | 47‍–‍34 | 46‍–‍34 |
| Pittsburgh Pirates | 92 | 70 | .568 | 3 | 46‍–‍35 | 46‍–‍35 |
| Philadelphia Phillies | 87 | 75 | .537 | 8 | 48‍–‍33 | 39‍–‍42 |
| Atlanta Braves | 85 | 77 | .525 | 10 | 43‍–‍38 | 42‍–‍39 |
| St. Louis Cardinals | 83 | 79 | .512 | 12 | 43‍–‍38 | 40‍–‍41 |
| Cincinnati Reds | 76 | 84 | .475 | 18 | 46‍–‍33 | 30‍–‍51 |
| Houston Astros | 72 | 90 | .444 | 23 | 45‍–‍36 | 27‍–‍54 |
| New York Mets | 66 | 95 | .410 | 28½ | 32‍–‍49 | 34‍–‍46 |
| Chicago Cubs | 59 | 103 | .364 | 36 | 32‍–‍49 | 27‍–‍54 |

Locations of teams for the 1966–1968 National League seasons
National League

== Nippon Professional Baseball final standings ==
=== Central League final standings ===
| Central League | G | W | L | T | Pct. | GB |
|---|---|---|---|---|---|---|
| Yomiuri Giants | 134 | 89 | 41 | 4 | .685 | — |
| Chunichi Dragons | 132 | 76 | 54 | 2 | .585 | 13.0 |
| Hanshin Tigers | 135 | 64 | 66 | 5 | .492 | 25.0 |
| Hiroshima Carp | 136 | 57 | 73 | 6 | .438 | 32.0 |
| Taiyo Whales | 130 | 52 | 78 | 0 | .400 | 37.0 |
| Sankei Atoms | 135 | 52 | 78 | 5 | .400 | 37.0 |

=== Pacific League final standings ===
| Pacific League | G | W | L | T | Pct. | GB |
|---|---|---|---|---|---|---|
| Nankai Hawks | 133 | 79 | 51 | 3 | .608 | — |
| Nishitetsu Lions | 138 | 75 | 55 | 8 | .577 | 4.0 |
| Toei Flyers | 136 | 70 | 60 | 6 | .538 | 9.0 |
| Tokyo Orions | 134 | 61 | 69 | 4 | .469 | 18.0 |
| Hankyu Braves | 134 | 57 | 73 | 4 | .438 | 22.0 |
| Kintetsu Buffaloes | 133 | 48 | 62 | 3 | .369 | 31.0 |

== Events ==
=== January ===
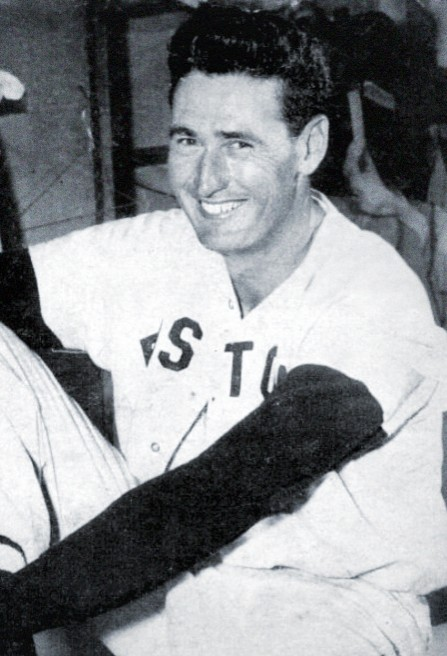
Ted Williams in 1949

- January 3 – The Baltimore Orioles release veteran left-hander Harvey Haddix. The 40-year-old hurler, famed for throwing 12 perfect innings (before giving up a baserunner, a hit, and the game itself in the 13th) on May 26, 1959, is beginning a new career as a pitching coach for the 1966 New York Mets.
- January 10 – The Philadelphia Phillies send Wes Covington to the Chicago Cubs for fellow outfielder Doug Clemens.
- January 14 – The New York Yankees trade backup catcher Doc Edwards to the Cleveland Indians for outfielder Lou Clinton.
- January 15 – The California Angels purchase the contract of veteran catcher Ed Bailey from the Chicago Cubs.
- January 20 – The Baseball Writers' Association of America voters elect Ted Williams to the Hall of Fame. Williams receives 282 of a possible 302 votes.

=== February ===
- February 22 – Slugger Dick Stuart's tenure in Philadelphia ends after only one season when the Phillies deal the indifferent-fielding first baseman to the New York Mets for catcher Jimmie Schaffer, second baseman Bobby Klaus and third baseman Wayne Graham.
- February 24 – The Orioles fly their starting catcher, Dick Brown, from their spring training camp to Baltimore to undergo tests to determine the cause of his severe headaches. Two weeks later, the 31-year-old Brown undergoes surgery to remove a brain tumor. Although he recovers from the operation, Brown's career is ended and he will ultimately succumb to the malady in April 1970.
- February 28 – Seeking an unprecedented three-year $1.05 million to be divided evenly, the Los Angeles Dodgers pitchers Sandy Koufax and Don Drysdale begin a joint holdout.

=== March ===
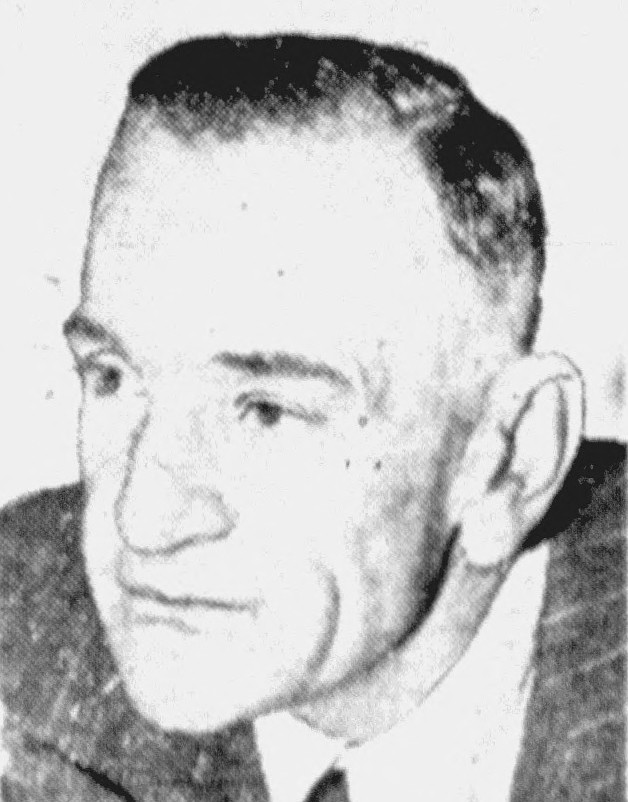
Casey Stengel

- March 5 – In what will prove to be one of the more influential off-the-field events in Major League history, United Steelworkers union official Marvin Miller is elected the Executive Director of the Major League Baseball Players Association (MLBPA). Under Miller's guidance, the players' union will make major gains such as salary increases, improvements in pension benefits, and the advent of free agency and salary arbitration. Miller will occupy his position from 1966 to 1982, as the players' union is transformed into one of the strongest unions in the United States.
- March 8 – The Special Veterans Committee waives Hall of Fame election rules and inducts Casey Stengel, 75, who managed the New York Yankees to ten American League pennants and seven World Series titles between 1949 and 1960. Stengel had retired from the New York Mets on August 30, 1965.
- March 10 – The Cleveland Indians trade backup catcher Cam Carreon to the Baltimore Orioles for minor-league outfielder Lou Piniella, coming off a .249, 11-homer season with Double-A Elmira (where he is managed by Earl Weaver). At this point in his career, the 22-year-old Piniella has been given only one at bat in the major leagues.
- March 17 – Sandy Koufax and Don Drysdale escalate their threat of retirement by signing movie contracts. On March 30, they will end their 32-day holdout, signing for $130,000 and $105,000 respectively.
- March 30
  - The Houston Astros activate veteran right-hander Robin Roberts. The 39-year-old future Hall-of-Famer had signed a coach's contract after the 1965 season, and he'd been given the opportunity to pitch himself back onto the Houston mound staff over spring training.
  - The Baltimore Orioles pick up left-handed-hitting backup catcher Vic Roznovsky from the Chicago Cubs in exchange for outfielder Carl Warwick. Roznovsky, Cam Carreon and Larry Haney will play behind rookie Andy Etchebarren, elevated to first-string catcher by Dick Brown's career-ending brain surgery.

=== April ===
- April 3
  - University of Southern California pitcher Tom Seaver signs with the New York Mets. He had been drafted by the Atlanta Braves in the January 1966 Major League Baseball draft, but Atlanta signed him to a minor league contract while he was still in college and rendered him ineligible to play for the Trojans. Commissioner of Baseball William Eckert voids the contract, with the Mets winning a special lottery over Cleveland and Philadelphia to win the right to sign him.
  - The Houston Astros and Boston Red Sox swap veteran infielders, with the Astros getting former AL All-Star Félix Mantilla for Eddie Kasko.
- April 6 – The Kansas City Athletics trade left-hander John O'Donoghue to the Cleveland Indians for righty Ralph Terry, a former 20-game winner (23–12) and World Series MVP for the 1962 New York Yankees.
- April 7 – The St. Louis Cardinals sell the contract of veteran pitcher Bob Purkey to his original team, the Pittsburgh Pirates. Purkey, too, won 20+ games (23–5) in 1962 when he was with the Cincinnati Reds.
- April 11 – At the traditional Presidential Opener at D.C. Stadium, Emmett Ashford officiates at third base in the Washington Senators' 5–2 win over the Cleveland Indians to become the first African-American umpire in MLB history. Ashford, 51, spent 12 years in the Pacific Coast League before being promoted to the American League umpiring staff over the winter. Vice President Hubert Humphrey throws out the first ball of the season.
- April 12
  - MLB officially enters the Southeastern U.S., as 50,671 fans show up at Atlanta Stadium to watch the Braves' first home game. In 13 innings, the Braves fall to the Pittsburgh Pirates, 3–2. Atlanta's Joe Torre hits the first homer in the ballpark, but the decisive blow is Willie Stargell's two-run blast off starting pitcher Tony Cloninger in the top of the 13th. Torre's second homer of the day, a solo shot in the home half, narrows the margin of defeat to one run.
  - On Opening Day at Fenway Park, the Baltimore Orioles' Frank Robinson and Brooks Robinson go a combined five for ten, score three runs and collect four RBI to spearhead a 13-inning 5–4 triumph over the Boston Red Sox. Each "Robby" hits a home run off Boston starter Earl Wilson. It's Frank Robinson's first American League game after ten seasons in Cincinnati and by the end of 1966, he'll be a Triple Crown winner, an AL MVP, and World Series champion.
- April 19 – The California Angels play their first regular-season game in their new ballpark, Anaheim Stadium, in front of 31,660 fans. The Angels' Rick Reichardt scores the first run, with a one-out solo home run in the bottom of the second inning. The Angels fall to the Chicago White Sox and Tommy John, 3–1, with Marcelino Lopez taking the loss for the home side.
- April 21 – The Chicago Cubs make one of the most successful trades of the 1960s, acquiring 23-year-old rookie right-hander Ferguson Jenkins from the Philadelphia Phillies, along with first baseman John Herrnstein and centerfielder Adolfo Phillips, for veteran pitchers Bob Buhl, 37, and Larry Jackson, 34. The trade helps transform the Cubs into a first division team in 1967, when Jenkins will begin a skein of six consecutive seasons of 20 or more victories, earning the 1971 National League Cy Young Award along the way. In two stints as a Cub, Jenkins will go 167–132 over ten seasons, and in 1991 he will be elected to the Baseball Hall of Fame.
- April 26 – The Los Angeles Dodgers place coach and veteran infielder Jim Gilliam on their 28-man roster. Gilliam will start 52 games at third base during the 1966 season and help the Dodgers win the NL pennant in his last year as an active player.
- April 28
  - Sonny Siebert and reliever Bob Allen scatter five hits and Leon Wagner hits a game-deciding sacrifice fly in the eighth inning to lead the Cleveland Indians to their tenth consecutive victory of 1966 (without a loss), 2–1 over the California Angels.
  - The Chicago Cubs trade minor-league third baseman Bobby Cox to the Atlanta Braves for spare outfielder Billy Cowan. Cox, 24, never plays for the MLB Braves but he will return to the team to become their Hall-of-Fame manager over 25 seasons between 1978 and 2010.
- April 30 – The California Angels erase a 9–3, eighth-inning deficit by scoring 12 runs, as they defeat the Boston Red Sox, 16–9 at Fenway Park. During the 11-hit, late-game uprising, Rick Reichardt hits two home runs and drives in four.

=== May ===
- May 1 – "Sudden Sam" McDowell, the Cleveland Indians' fireballing, 23-year-old left-hander, one-hits the visiting Chicago White Sox and earns his fourth win of the year (without a loss) with a 1–0 victory. Don Buford's third-inning double spoils the no no. McDowell himself singles twice in his three at bats off hard-luck loser Tommy John. Cleveland's record improves to 11–1, but, incredibly, the Indians are a half game behind the first-place, 12–1 Baltimore Orioles.
- May 4
  - At Yankee Stadium, Indians shortstop Larry Brown and left-fielder Leon Wagner collide while chasing a fourth-inning pop fly hit by Roger Maris. Wagner sustains a concussion but misses only one game of action; however, Brown suffers a broken nose and fractured skull and he doesn't return to the Cleveland lineup until June 16. Maris's popup lands for a double, but Sonny Siebert fires a complete-game, 2–1 Tribe victory.
  - The San Francisco Giants' Willie Mays hits his 512th career home run, breaking the existing National League and topping another Giant, the late Mel Ott. San Francisco beats the Los Angeles Dodgers, 6–1, at Candlestick Park.
- May 6 – In a head-to-head matchup between the Indians (now 14–1 and back in first place) and Orioles (who've fallen to 12–3) at Memorial Stadium, it takes 15 innings for Baltimore to outlast Cleveland, 3–2. The Tribe take a 2–1 lead in the visitors' half of the 15th, but the Orioles tie the game on rookie Davey Johnson's home run and win it on a "walk-off," RBI single by Boog Powell.
- May 7 – One day after the New York Yankees' record falls to 4–16, general manager Ralph Houk fires Johnny Keane as manager and returns to manage the team himself. Dan Topping, Jr. replaces Houk as general manager. Houk had managed the Yankees to three consecutive American League pennants from 1961 to 1963 and a World Series title during the first two of those years, but his second stint will have a far less than successful beginning. Their talent and farm system both depleted, the Yankees, after finishing in sixth place in 1965, will finish dead last—their first time doing so since 1912.
- May 8
  - The San Francisco Giants trade first baseman/outfielder Orlando Cepeda to the St. Louis Cardinals for pitcher Ray Sadecki. Cepeda will go on to win the National League Most Valuable Player award in 1967 on the Cardinals' World Championship team. That same day, the Giants defeat the Cardinals 10–5 in the final game at the old Busch Stadium.
  - Frank Robinson of the Baltimore Orioles hits what will be the only home run hit out of Memorial Stadium. The shot comes against Luis Tiant in the first inning of the Orioles' 8–3 victory in the second game of a doubleheader against the Cleveland Indians.
- May 10
  - In a clash of the National League's two top teams at Forbes Field, the visiting San Francisco Giants edge the Pittsburgh Pirates 2–1 in 15 innings. The winning run scores on a fielder's choice. With the victory, the Giants improve to 19–7 on the year, and the Bucs fall to 14–9, 3½ games behind.
  - The Los Angeles Dodgers send left-hander Johnny Podres to the Detroit Tigers for "future considerations." Podres, 33, is a Dodger immortal thanks to his Game 7 shutout victory in the 1955 World Series that delivered Brooklyn's only world championship. He went 136–104 (3.66) in 13 seasons with the club, led the National League in ERA (2.66) (1957) and winning percentage (18–5, .783) (1961), was a four-time NL All-Star, and a 4x World Series champion, going 4–1 (2.11 ERA) in six World Series games spanning 11 seasons (1953, 1955, 1959, 1963).
- May 12 – With 46,048 spectators in attendance for the first game at the new Busch Memorial Stadium, the St. Louis Cardinals defeat the Atlanta Braves in 12 innings, 4–3, behind a single RBI by Lou Brock. Braves outfielder Felipe Alou delivers a pair of home runs.
- May 13 – At Shea Stadium, Jim Davenport's 17th-inning home run is the difference as the San Francisco Giants defeat the New York Mets, 5–4.
- May 14 – The San Francisco Giants' Willie Mays hits his then National League record 512th home run – topping another Giant, Mel Ott. The Giants beat the Los Angeles Dodgers 6–1 at San Francisco's Candlestick Park.
- May 16 – Detroit Tigers manager Chuck Dressen is hospitalized with his second heart attack in as many seasons. Third-base coach Bob Swift takes over as interim manager for the second consecutive year while Dressen recuperates.
- May 18 – Boston Red Sox right-hander Earl Wilson, one of the best-hitting pitchers in the American League, homers off Jim Palmer to give himself a ten-inning, 2–1 victory over the Baltimore Orioles at Memorial Stadium.
- May 27 – The Kansas City Athletics trade infielder Wayne Causey to the Chicago White Sox for first baseman Danny Cater.

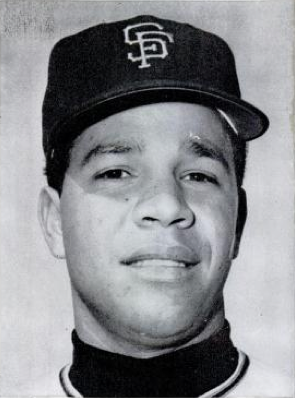
Juan Marichal in 1962

- May 31
  - San Francisco Giants' staff ace and future Hall-of-Famer Juan Marichal improves to 10–0 in 11 starts with a 5–3 victory over the Cincinnati Reds at Crosley Field. Marichal has thrown nine complete games and four shutouts—including a 14-inning, complete game blanking of the Philadelphia Phillies May 26—and the three earned runs he allows today "balloon" his ERA from 0.59 to 0.80.
  - The Cleveland Indians (28–14) maintain their three-game lead in the American League with a 17-inning, 7–5 victory over the California Angels at Anaheim Stadium. Steve Hargan throws ten innings of one-run relief to get the win, and Luis Tiant gets the save.

=== June ===
- June 2 – The Cleveland Indians acquire former two-time All-Star and American League saves leader Dick Radatz from the Boston Red Sox for fellow hurlers Don McMahon and Lee Stange. The hulking 6 ft 6 in (1.98 m), 230 lb (100 kg) Radatz, 29, known as "The Monster," is struggling unsuccessfully to regain his form since his effectiveness began to diminish in 1965.
- June 4 – The once-proud New York Yankees and Boston Red Sox, lodged in eighth and ninth place in the ten-team American League, use 11 pitchers in all and battle for 16 innings at Fenway Park before the Red Sox' Jim Gosger blasts a walk-off home run with two men on base off Dooley Womack, giving Boston a 6–3 win.
- June 7 – In the second annual MLB June amateur draft, the Kansas City Athletics use the second overall pick to draft Arizona State outfielder Reggie Jackson. With the first pick overall, the New York Mets select high-school catcher Steve Chilcott, whose career will be derailed by injuries before he can reach the major leagues.
- June 9 – At Metropolitan Stadium, the Minnesota Twins rock the Kansas City Athletics, 9–4, with five home runs off the bats of Rich Rollins, Zoilo Versalles, Tony Oliva, Don Mincher and Harmon Killebrew in the seventh inning. These five home runs still stand as a Major League record for the most home runs batted in a single inning (tied several times since then), and were hit off starter Catfish Hunter (two), reliever Paul Lindblad (two), and reliever John Wyatt.
- June 10
  - Sonny Siebert of the Cleveland Indians no-hits the Washington Senators 2–0 at Cleveland Stadium. The no-hitter is the first by an Indian since Bob Feller's third career no-hitter, in 1951.
  - The New York Yankees trade pitchers Bill Stafford and Gil Blanco and outfielder Roger Repoz to the Kansas City Athletics for pitcher Fred Talbot and backup catcher Billy Bryan.
- June 13
  - The Baltimore Orioles bolster their bullpen by picking up knuckleballer Eddie Fisher from the Chicago White Sox for infielder Jerry Adair and minor-league outfielder John Riddle.
  - The Kansas City Athletics keep dealing, sending pitchers Rollie Sheldon and John Wyatt and outfielder José Tartabull to the Boston Red Sox for pitchers Guido Grilli and Ken Sanders and outfielder Jim Gosger. Wyatt and Tartabull will play key roles for the Red Sox in their 1967 "Impossible Dream" season.
- June 14
  - The Baltimore Orioles (38–20) defeat the New York Yankees 2–1, while the Cleveland Indians (35–19) split a double-header, enabling the Orioles to take sole possession of first place in the American League standings by one game. They will remain the AL front-runner through the rest of the season.
  - The Detroit Tigers acquire starting pitcher Earl Wilson from the Red Sox, along with backup outfielder Joe Christopher, for outfielder Don Demeter and pitcher Julio Navarro "(PTBNL)." Wilson will win 60 games for the Tigers over the next 3½ seasons, including a 22-win campaign in 1967.
- June 15 – The scuffling (28–35) Atlanta Braves shake up their pitching staff through two trades, sending Hank Fischer to the Cincinnati Reds for former 2x 20-game-winner Joey Jay, and southpaw Billy O'Dell to the Pittsburgh Pirates for right-hander Don Schwall.
- June 22 – The St. Louis Cardinals sell the contract of 37-year-old lefty Curt Simmons, an erstwhile "Whiz Kid," to the Chicago Cubs.
- June 30 – Gaylord Perry of the San Francisco Giants improves his record to 11–1 by defeating the Atlanta Braves 3–1 at Candlestick Park, striking out 12 men. Perry and Juan Marichal have combined for a 24–4 won–lost record and account for 50% of the first-place Giants' 48 wins.

=== July ===
- July 3 – At Candlestick Park, Atlanta Braves pitcher Tony Cloninger hits two grand slams in a game against the Giants; he thus becomes the first National League player and only pitcher in major league history to do so. His nine RBI in a game also is a record for pitchers. The Braves win 17–3 and Cloninger improves his record to 9–7.
- July 4 – After a doubleheader split, the San Francisco Giants (50–31) continue to hold first place in the National League standings at the season's customary half-way point, leading the Pittsburgh Pirates (46–32) by 2½ games. The Los Angeles Dodgers (43–34) are third, five games out. In the American League, the Baltimore Orioles (55–26) have opened up a seven-game lead, over the Detroit Tigers (46–31).
- July 5 – Sandy Koufax wins his 15th game of 1966 (against three losses), shutting out the Cincinnati Reds at Dodger Stadium 1–0, with third baseman John Kennedy knocking in the winning run. Searching for right-handed thump off their bench, Los Angeles today also signs veteran slugger Dick Stuart, 33, released by the New York Mets on June 15.
- July 9 – Astroturf is finally installed in the Astrodome outfield.
- July 12 – At St. Louis, Maury Wills' tenth-inning single scores Tim McCarver, as the National League wins 2–1 over the American League in the All-Star Game, but the Americans' Brooks Robinson's stellar game (three hits, eight fielding chances) earns him the MVP honors.
- July 13
  - Struggling at 37–46, the Cincinnati Reds replace first-year manager Don Heffner with third-base coach Dave Bristol. At 33, Bristol becomes the youngest manager in the majors.
  - The last-place Chicago Cubs sign free-agent future Hall-of-Famer Robin Roberts, released July 4 by the Houston Astros. Roberts, 39, joins fellow ex-"Whiz Kid" Curt Simmons, 37, on the Cubbies' roster.
- July 14 – Detroit Tigers' interim manager Bob Swift, at the helm since May 16 when Chuck Dressen took a medical leave for treatment of a heart attack, is hospitalized with inoperable lung cancer; Frank Skaff, a Tiger coach, becomes the club's second interim manager of the 1966 season. The 51-year-old Swift, a former Tiger catcher, succumbs to cancer October 17.
- July 21 – Against the Washington Senators in D.C., Minnesota Twins pitcher Jim Merritt strikes out 12 in a 1–0 shutout win. Seven of the dozen strikeouts are consecutive, in the middle innings, to set an American League record. The final out in Merritt's string is his mound opponent Jim Hannan, who ironically had struck out Merritt just prior to the strikeout streak beginning.
- July 25 – During his Hall of Fame induction speech, Ted Williams publicly calls on baseball to induct former great players from the Negro leagues. He specifically calls for the induction of Josh Gibson and Satchel Paige. Williams' wish becomes true five years later when Paige is inducted into the Hall of Fame.
- July 27 – At Dodger Stadium, Sandy Koufax of the Los Angeles Dodgers faces Jim Bunning of the Philadelphia Phillies in the first matchup of perfect-game pitchers. The Dodgers defeat the Phillies 2–1 in 12 innings with neither pitcher involved in the decision; both pitchers had worked 11 innings, with Koufax giving up four hits and striking out 16 and Bunning six hits and striking out 12.
- July 28 – Rick Reichardt, the hard-hitting, 23-year-old California Angels left-fielder, is forced to the sidelines by kidney disease. After having one kidney removed in August, Reichardt misses all but one game for the rest of 1966—returning to pinch hit in the Halos' final regular season game on October 2. Fully recovered by 1967, he goes on to play in the majors through April 9, 1974, bashing 116 home runs in 997 career games.
- July 29 – When Mickey Mantle homers against Bruce Howard of the Chicago White Sox, it is his 494th career home run, enabling him to pass Lou Gehrig for sixth place on the all-time list. The Yankees and Al Downing beat the White Sox, 2–1.

=== August ===
- August 1 – Jimmy Wynn, the Houston Astros' standout young centerfielder, breaks his arm crashing into the Connie Mack Stadium outfield wall chasing a long drive hit by the Philadelphia Phillies' Dick Allen. The drive stays in the yard, but Allen legs out an inside-the-park home run, delivering a "walk-off," ten-inning 6–5 Philadelphia victory. Worse yet, Wynn is sidelined for the remainder of the season and the Astros drop 35 of their last 58 games.
- August 4 – The Pittsburgh Pirates thrash the Los Angeles Dodgers at Forbes Field 8–1 behind veteran hurler Vern Law to take the lead in the National League from the San Francisco Giants, who fall to the lowly New York Mets. The Giants have led the NL since early May, but have been playing only .500 ball since July 1.
- August 9 – With the Atlanta Braves sitting at 52–59, seventh in the ten-team National league, fourth-year skipper Bobby Bragan is replaced by coach Billy Hitchcock at the team's helm. Under Hitchcock, the Braves recover to win 33 of their last 51 games and squeak into fifth place and the first division in their debut season in Georgia.
- August 10 – Chuck Dressen, the Detroit Tigers' manager on medical leave since May 16 after suffering a heart attack, dies in a Detroit hospital at age 71.
- August 11 – Because of air-travel plans, both the visiting Houston Astros and home-side Chicago Cubs agree that—in today's doubleheader at Wrigley Field—no inning can begin after 5:30 p.m. The teams play seven full innings of the second game, and Houston leads 8–5, when the game is suspended. Because the Astros will not visit Chicago again during the 1966 season, the game will be resumed in the eighth inning at the Astrodome on August 26 with new umpires, and the Astros the "visiting" team. Houston will hold on to win, 9–8.
- August 12
  - At Crosley Field, the Cincinnati Reds' Art Shamsky bashes three home runs, but the Pittsburgh Pirates prevail in 13 innings, 14–11. The teams combine to hit 11 long balls in the contest.
  - Gaylord Perry of the San Francisco Giants wins his 18th game (against two losses) and Willie Mays provides the game's only scoring with a solo home run off Mike Cuellar (Mays' 27th of the year), enabling the Giants to defeat the visiting Houston Astros 1–0. The Giants trail the Pirates by two games in the National League pennant race, with the Los Angeles Dodgers now four games back.
- August 15 – The Baltimore Orioles' left-handed slugger Boog Powell hits three opposite-field homers over the left-field Green Monster at Fenway Park. Powell has 13 total bases in the game, won by Baltimore, 4–2, in 11 innings.
- August 19 – Birdie Tebbetts resigns as manager of the Cleveland Indians and coach George Strickland finishes the year as interim skipper. Cleveland had started the season by winning 14 of its first 15 games, but had gone only 52–56 under Tebbetts since May 5. The book closes on the former catcher's MLB managerial career with a record of 748–705 (.515) for three teams over 11 seasons between 1954 and 1966.
- August 23 – The San Francisco Giants retake first place in the National League behind Juan Marichal (18–5) with a 7–3 victory over the Cincinnati Reds at Candlestick Park. The Pittsburgh Pirates, with whom the Giants have been lodged in a virtual tie for the past week, lose at home to the Philadelphia Phillies 5–4. The Los Angeles Dodgers remain in third, three games behind San Francisco.
- August 28 – Kansas City Athletics rookie right-hander Jim Nash throws a complete game, 2–1 victory over the California Angels at Anaheim Stadium, improving his won–lost mark to 9–1 (2.50) since his MLB debut July 3. The 21-year-old will finish the year 12–1 (2.06 ERA) and help lead the Athletics to a seventh-place record and 74 wins, the team's best since moving to Kansas City in 1955. Nash will finish second to Tommie Agee in American League Rookie of the Year voting.
- August 29 – The Detroit Tigers' Denny McLain wins his 16th start of the season, even though he doesn't do it the easy way. He throws 229 pitches, walks nine, and allows eight hits. However, he strikes out 11 in a 6–3 win over the Baltimore Orioles.
- August 31 – Veteran baseball man Paul Richards, 57, is named director of player personnel of the Atlanta Braves, effectively supplanting John McHale as general manager. McHale remains as club president, but will depart for the Commissioner's office early in 1967.

=== September ===
- September 5 – Labor Day action concludes with the National League endowed with another pennant race. The Pittsburgh Pirates (82–57) hold the top spot, but the surging Los Angeles Dodgers (79–57) are now the runners-up by 1½ games and the San Francisco Giants (79–59) are third, 2½ back. There is no pennant suspense in the American League, however, with the Baltimore Orioles (87–51) 10½ games ahead of the Detroit Tigers, and rampaging towards the second AL title in franchise history and first ever representing Baltimore.
- September 9 – Billy Herman is fired as manager of the 64–82 Boston Red Sox with his club in ninth place. Coach Pete Runnels will serve as interim pilot over the season's final 16 games. Herman, 57, a future inductee into the Baseball Hall of Fame for his stellar career as a second baseman, has compiled a 128–182 record as the Bosox' skipper since October 3, 1964.
- September 11
  - The Los Angeles Dodgers jump into first place in the National League race by a full game when they sweep the Houston Astros in a Sunday doubleheader at Dodger Stadium with two shutout wins, 4–0 and 1–0. In Game 1, Sandy Koufax improves to 23–8 by throwing a six-hitter; in the nightcap, three Los Angeles hurlers hold Houston scoreless, while the only run of the game comes on John Roseboro's seventh-inning RBI single. Meanwhile, both the Pittsburgh Pirates and San Francisco Giants drop one-run games.
  - Atlanta Braves pitcher Pat Jarvis becomes the first strikeout victim of Nolan Ryan's MLB career in Ryan's debut game. The 19-year-old Texan has been recalled by the New York Mets after going 17–4 (2.36 ERA) with 307 strikeouts in 202 minor league innings.
- September 12 – Dodgers reliever Ron Perranoski fans the first six batters he faces and earns a 3–2 win over the New York Mets. With the help of second baseman Ron Hunt, Mets rookie shortstop Bud Harrelson picks off Lou Johnson with the hidden ball trick in the sixth.
- September 16 – A Friday night game between the Kansas City Athletics and Washington Senators at District of Columbia Stadium is suspended in the third inning when the arc lights shut down at the five-year-old facility. The game is scoreless at the time; when it's resumed on Sunday, September 18, Athletics' starting pitcher Lew Krausse Jr. returns to the mound and pitches into the eighth inning to secure his 14th victory of 1966, 3–0.
- September 18 – At Yankee Stadium, the New York Yankees fall to last place after losing to the Minnesota Twins 5–3 in ten innings on pinch-hitter Bob Allison's three-run home run. The Yankees will stay in the cellar for the remainder of the season, finishing there for the first time since 1912.
- September 22
  - The Baltimore Orioles beat the host Kansas City Athletics, 6–1, to clinch their first American League pennant since the St. Louis Browns moved to Baltimore in 1954. Both Brooks Robinson and Frank Robinson have two runs batted in. Frank Robinson will end the year as the Triple Crown winner, the first to achieve the feat since Mickey Mantle in 1956, after hitting a .316 batting average with 49 home runs and 122 RBI.
  - In a one-game series delayed two days by rain, the New York Yankees lose to the Chicago White Sox 4–1. The game is played in front of just 413 fans in Yankee Stadium I, the smallest crowd in the history of any version of the stadium and the fifth-smallest crowd in Major League Baseball history. Four days later, on September 26, broadcast pioneer Red Barber, who telecast the infamous game, is told his contract will not be renewed by then-Yankees owner CBS. Barber and others believe that his firing is caused by his reporting the small crowd. Only 58, he will never broadcast another major-league game. Barber will be honored (with Mel Allen) as one of the first two winners of the Ford C. Frick Award in Cooperstown in 1978.
- September 23 – Phil Regan, ace short reliever of the Los Angeles Dodgers, improves his won–lost record to 14–1, throwing 22/3 perfect innings and enabling his first-place club to improve its NL lead to 2½ games over the Pittsburgh Pirates by sweeping a doubleheader against the last-place Chicago Cubs at Wrigley Field. Although he's been jokingly given the nickname of "The Vulture" by Sandy Koufax for picking up "easy wins" during 1966, Regan will have an almost-flawless stretch run starting September 1, appearing in 15 games, and going 2–0 with seven saves, 20 strikeouts, and an earned run average of 1.46 over 242/3 innings.
- September 25 – In a battle of Jewish-American left-handers, Ken Holtzman of the Cubs has a no-hitter against the Dodgers' Sandy Koufax broken up on a Dick Schofield single leading off the ninth. Schofield later scores on a Maury Wills single; the two hits are all Holtzman allows in a 2–1 victory in what will be Koufax's final regular-season loss. The Cubs score their runs in the first when lead-off man Don Kessinger walks and scores on Glenn Beckert's triple one batter later, then Beckert scores when Jim Lefebvre drops Ernie Banks' pop-up for what would have been the third out.
- September 26 – Willie McCovey hits his 200th career home run, helping the San Francisco Giants beat the Atlanta Braves, 8–2.
- September 28
  - Left-hander Larry Jaster, in his first full season with the St. Louis Cardinals, throws his fifth consecutive shutout victory over the pennant-bound Los Angeles Dodgers. In those 45 innings pitched, he permits 24 hits and eight walks. They are the only shutouts he tosses during 1966, and the five blankings tie him with five other hurlers for the NL lead.
  - The Boston Red Sox, ninth-place finishers in the American League, sign 37-year-old Dick Williams to a one-year contract as manager for 1967. The former MLB outfielder had led their Triple-A club, the Toronto Maple Leafs of the International League, to two straight playoff championships. Williams will manage the "Impossible Dream" 1967 Red Sox to their first pennant in 21 years, kicking off a 21-year Hall of Fame career that includes two World Series titles as skipper of the 1972 and 1973 Oakland Athletics.
- September 30 – Three teams remain in the running for the National League pennant. The Dodgers, who have gone 20–9 on the month to take the lead, are 1½ games ahead of the Pittsburgh Pirates and three in front of the San Francisco Giants, who play each other in a three-game weekend series at Forbes Field.

=== October ===
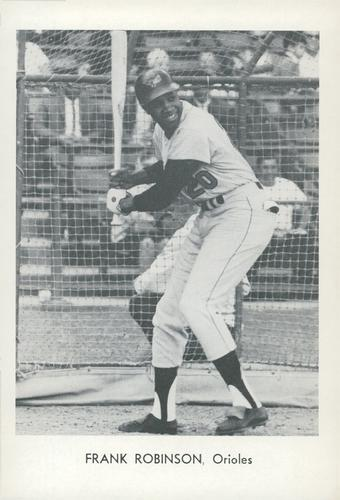
Frank Robinson in 1966

- October 2 – In the second game of a doubleheader at Connie Mack Stadium, the Los Angeles Dodgers defeat the Philadelphia Phillies 6–3 to clinch the National League pennant in their final regular-season game. In a battle of future Hall-of-Famers, Sandy Koufax bests Jim Bunning. The last victory of Koufax's career enables him to win his 27th game of 1966, the third time in four seasons in which he's won 25 or more games. Despite giving up three runs in the ninth, Koufax goes the distance and strikes out Jackie Brandt for the final out.
- October 3 – Mayo Smith, 51, former skipper of the Philadelphia Phillies (1955–1958) and Cincinnati Reds (1959), is named the Detroit Tigers' manager for 1967, becoming the Bengals' fourth pilot of calendar year 1966; Smith will lead Detroit to the 1968 World Series championship.
- October 4 – Veteran first baseman Joe Adcock, 38, of the California Angels ends his 17-year playing career to become manager of the Cleveland Indians for 1967.
- October 9
  - In Game 4 of the World Series, Dave McNally wraps up a brilliant pitching display, and the first World Series championship for the Baltimore Orioles, with a four-hit, 1–0 shutout against the Los Angeles Dodgers. Series MVP Frank Robinson hits a home run off Don Drysdale for the only run of the game and gave Baltimore a sweep of the defending World Series champions.
  - The shutout completes a World Series record 332/3 scoreless innings pitched by Oriole hurlers, beginning with Moe Drabowsky throwing 62/3 innings in relief of McNally in Game 1, followed by shutouts by Jim Palmer and Wally Bunker—neither of whom had pitched a shutout during the regular season. The Orioles (who played from 1902–1953 as the St. Louis Browns) are the last of the original eight American League franchises to win their first World Series.
  - The Dodgers collect only 17 hits in the four games, and bat .142 as a team.
- October 12 – The Chicago White Sox obtain southpaw knuckleballer Wilbur Wood from the Pittsburgh Pirates for a player to be named later (fellow lefty hurler Juan Pizarro, added to the deal November 28). Wood will flourish in Chicago, winning 163 games for the ChiSox over the next dozen seasons.
- October 14 – Lee MacPhail leaves his high-ranking job in the Office of the Commissioner of Baseball to become the New York Yankees' executive vice president/general manager. MacPhail will head the Yanks' front office until December 31, 1973, when he becomes the fifth president of the American League en route to a plaque in the Baseball Hall of Fame (elected 1998).

=== November ===
- November 8 – Frank Robinson of the world-champion Baltimore Orioles wins the American League Most Valuable Player Award, becoming the first man to gain MVP recognition by the BBWAA in each major league; he had won the NL award in 1961.
- November 12 – The Los Angeles Dodgers complete an 18-game tour of Japan with a 9–8–1 record. The eight losses are the most for an MLB club touring the Far East.
- November 14 – George Weiss retires as president of the New York Mets and is succeeded by his top aide, Bing Devine. Weiss will be elected to the Hall of Fame in 1971 for his prior accomplishments as an executive with the New York Yankees, while Devine makes significant contributions to the 1969 "Miracle Mets" during his brief term as president/GM.
- November 16 – Roberto Clemente of the Pittsburgh Pirates (202 hits, 29 HR, 119 RBI, and a Gold Glove right fielder in 1966) is selected the Most Valuable Player of the National League by the BBWAA. The future Hall-of-Famer is the first Puerto Rican and second Latin American to capture an MLB MVP award.
- November 18 – Sandy Koufax announces his retirement from baseball due to arthritis in his left elbow. Six years later he will become the youngest player elected to the Hall of Fame.
- November 23 – Chicago White Sox outfielder Tommie Agee is voted American League Rookie of the Year, gathering 16 of the 18 votes. Kansas City Athletics pitcher Jim Nash gets the other two votes. Agee had been brought up briefly the past four seasons before finding a permanent spot in 1966.
- November 25 – Cincinnati Reds infielder Tommy Helms is voted National League Rookie of the Year with 12 of 20 first place votes, with the others going to Sonny Jackson (3), Tito Fuentes (2), Randy Hundley (1), Larry Jaster (1) and Cleon Jones (1).
- November 28 – Veteran reliever Ted Abernathy, 33, who had a poor 1966 as a member of the Chicago Cubs and Atlanta Braves, is selected by the Cincinnati Reds in the Rule 5 draft. In 1967, the "submariner" will lead the National League in games pitched (70) and saves (28), while posting a microscopic 1.27 earned run average.
- November 29
  - The New York Yankees deal veteran, slick-fielding third baseman Clete Boyer to the Atlanta Braves for relief pitcher Chi-Chi Olivo and outfielder Bill Robinson.
  - The New York Mets trade outfielder Jim Hickman and second baseman Ron Hunt to the Los Angeles Dodgers for outfielders Tommy Davis and Derrell Griffith. Hickman had been the last of the Original Mets. Davis, 27, is a three-time All-Star and two-time National League batting champion.
- November 30 – The Washington Senators trade centerfielder Don Lock to the Philadelphia Phillies for left-hander Darold Knowles and cash.

=== December ===
- December 1 – The Los Angeles Dodgers send six-time National League stolen base king Maury Wills to the Pittsburgh Pirates in exchange for third baseman Bob Bailey and shortstop Gene Michael. Wills, 34, holds the MLB record for stolen bases in a season (104 in 1962 and 165 games played), but he angered Dodger management when he left the team during its recent tour of Japan.
- December 2 – The Minnesota Twins acquire 1964 MLB Cy Young Award-winning right-hander Dean Chance, along with shortstop Jackie Hernández ("PTBNL"), from the California Angels for pitcher Pete Cimino, first baseman Don Mincher and centerfielder Jimmie Hall. Chance will win 20 games for the 1967 Twins.
- December 3 – Camilo Pascual, ace starting pitcher during the final years of the pre-1961, "old" Washington Senators, returns to the U.S. capital when he's obtained by the "new" Senators from the Minnesota Twins, with second baseman Bernie Allen, for pitcher Ron Kline. Pascual, 32, is a six-time AL All-Star who twice won 20 games after the old Senators moved to Minnesota.
- December 5 – Bill DeWitt Sr. sells the Cincinnati Reds to a local consortium of businessmen led by Francis L. Dale, an attorney and the publisher of The Cincinnati Enquirer newspaper. The reported sale price is $8 million. Members of the new ownership group will guide the fortunes of the team through its "Big Red Machine" 1970s dynasty.
- December 6 – The New York Mets trade pitcher Dennis Ribant and outfielder Gary Kolb to the Pittsburgh Pirates for right-hander Don Cardwell and outfielder Don Bosch.
- December 7 – The Philadelphia Phillies trade right-hander Ray Culp to the Chicago Cubs for lefty Dick Ellsworth.
- December 8 – The St. Louis Cardinals acquire right fielder Roger Maris, holder of MLB's single-season home run record, from the New York Yankees for third baseman Charley Smith. Maris, 32, a seven-time All-Star, two-time American League Most Valuable Player, five-time AL champion, and two-time World Series champion, will play two seasons for the Redbirds, winning a 1967 World Series ring and two National League titles.
- December 13 – The San Francisco Giants reacquire southpaw Mike McCormick in a trade with the Washington Senators for right-hander Bob Priddy and outfielder Cap Peterson. McCormick, a former Giants' "bonus baby" who's now 28 years old, will win 22 games and the NL Cy Young Award in 1967.
- December 14 – The Chicago White Sox send veteran catcher Johnny Romano and minor league pitcher Lee White to the St. Louis Cardinals for pitcher Don Dennis and outfielder Walt Williams.
- December 15
  - The White Sox acquire left-hander Jim O'Toole, a native Chicagoan, from the Cincinnati Reds for outfielder Floyd Robinson. O'Toole is a former 19-game-winner and NL All-Star, and Robinson batted over .300 three times during the early 1960s.
  - The world-champion Baltimore Orioles trade veteran relief pitcher Dick Hall to the Philadelphia Phillies for left-hander John Morris.
- December 20 – The Cleveland Indians trade shortstop Dick Howser to the New York Yankees for minor-league hurler Gil Downs and cash. Howser, 30, will spend over a dozen seasons with the Yanks as a player (1967–1968), third-base coach (1969–1978) and manager (1980).
- December 31 – The Atlanta Braves make a trade with the Houston Astros. The Braves send Houston infielder Sandy Alomar Sr., pitcher Arnie Umbach and third baseman Eddie Mathews in exchange for outfielder Dave Nicholson and pitcher Bob Bruce. The trade ends Mathews' 15-year tenure as the Braves' third baseman; he is the only man who played for the franchise in Boston, Milwaukee and Atlanta.

== Births ==
=== January ===
- January 5 – Steve Shifflett
- January 16 – Jack McDowell
- January 19 – Anthony Young
- January 21 – Chris Hammond
- January 25 – Richie Lewis

=== February ===
- February 1
  - Darrin Chapin
  - Eduardo Zambrano
- February 3 – Paul McClellan
- February 5 – Ray Giannelli
- February 7 – Stu Cole
- February 12 – Jeff Pico
- February 13 – Jerry Browne
- February 15 – Mélido Pérez
- February 20 – Derek Lilliquist
- February 24
  - René Arocha
  - Rod Brewer
- February 27
  - Chris Howard
  - Pete Smith

=== March ===
- March 2 – Leo Gómez
- March 3 – Francisco de la Rosa
- March 4 – Andy Mota
- March 5 – Kevin L. Brown
- March 6
  - Joe Hall
  - Anthony Telford
- March 7 – Mauro Gozzo
- March 10 – Mike Timlin
- March 12 – Mike Ignasiak
- March 19 – Tony Scruggs
- March 20
  - Dino Ebel
  - Blas Minor
- March 21 – Roger Smithberg
- March 22 – Sean Berry
- March 23 – Mike Remlinger
- March 25 – Tom Glavine
- March 29 – Eric Gunderson
- March 30 – Terry Bross

=== April ===
- April 7 – Freddie Benavides
- April 8 – Alex Sanchez
- April 11 – Steve Scarsone
- April 13 – Wes Chamberlain
- April 14
  - David Justice
  - Greg Maddux
  - Greg Myers
- April 20 – Tony Perezchica
- April 21 – Chris Donnels
- April 22 – Mickey Morandini
- April 25
  - Darren Holmes
  - Erik Pappas
- April 27
  - Bob Ayrault
  - Eric Hillman
- April 28 – Jim Poole
- April 29
  - Ed Correa
  - John Vander Wal

=== May ===
- May 1 – Armando Reynoso
- May 5 – Reggie Williams
- May 12 – Rafael Bournigal
- May 13 – Chris Nichting
- May 17 – Jack Voigt
- May 19 – Jim Campbell
- May 22 – José Mesa
- May 25
  - Bill Haselman
  - Dave Hollins
- May 27 – John Jaha
- May 28 – Mike Maksudian

=== June ===
- June 5 – Bill Spiers
- June 7
  - Heathcliff Slocumb
  - Trevor Wilson
- June 13 – Scott Coolbaugh
- June 14 – Randy Tomlin
- June 15 – Dave Liddell
- June 17 – Shawn Abner
- June 18 – Sandy Alomar Jr.
- June 22 – Jorge Brito
- June 27 – Jeff Conine
- June 28
  - Frank Bolick
  - Shawn Jeter
- June 29 – Peter Hoy
- June 30 – Paul Schrieber

=== July ===
- July 2 – Tim Spehr
- July 3 – Moisés Alou
- July 5 – Dave Eiland
- July 6
  - Jeremy Hernandez
  - Darrin Winston
- July 7
  - Dave Burba
  - Jeff Shaw
- July 11 – Efraín Valdez
- July 15 – Brett Merriman
- July 19
  - Tim Leiper
  - David Segui
- July 28 – Derek Lee
- July 30 – Mike Anderson

=== August ===
- August 2 – Tim Wakefield
- August 4 – Jeff Johnson
- August 5 – Jerry Nielsen
- August 6 – Stan Belinda
- August 8 – John Hudek
- August 9 – Bob Scanlan
- August 10 – Gerald Williams
- August 12 – Dean Hartgraves
- August 14 – Dana Allison
- August 15
  - Scott Brosius
  - Dan Walters
- August 16
  - Steve Foster
  - Terry Shumpert
- August 17 – Tony Barron
- August 18 – Bob Zupcic
- August 19 – Woody Williams
- August 21 – John Wetteland
- August 22 – Scott Chiamparino
- August 24 – Dean Wilkins
- August 25 – Albert Belle
- August 26 – Víctor Rosario
- August 31 – Jeff Frye

=== September ===
- September 2 – Terry Jorgensen
- September 8 – Mike Dyer
- September 10 – Riccardo Ingram
- September 14 – Mike Draper
- September 15 – Doug Simons
- September 23 – Pete Harnisch
- September 24
  - Chris George
  - Bernard Gilkey
  - Kevin Koslofski
- September 28 – César Hernández

=== October ===
- October 3
  - Darrin Fletcher
  - Scott Taylor
- October 4
  - Tim Mauser
  - Mike Walker
- October 6 – Archi Cianfrocco
- October 8 – Jay Gainer
- October 10 – Francisco Cabrera
- October 11 – Gregg Olson
- October 12 – Jorge Pedre
- October 18
  - Carlos Maldonado
  - Alan Mills
- October 19 – Dave Veres
- October 20 – Jonathan Hurst
- October 21 – Kevin Batiste
- October 25 – Mike Harkey
- October 28
  - Tim Bogar
  - Juan Guzmán
- October 29 – Pat Combs
- October 30 – Mark Ettles
- October 31 – Brian Keyser

=== November ===
- November 1 – Bob Wells
- November 2 – Orlando Merced
- November 4 – Brian Drahman
- November 7
  - William Suero
  - Andy Tomberlin
- November 11 – Dave Telgheder
- November 14 – Curt Schilling
- November 16 – Tim Scott
- November 17
  - Andy Fletcher
  - Jeff Nelson
- November 18
  - Ron Coomer
  - Howard Farmer
  - Eddie Tucker
- November 19 – Jeff Hartsock
- November 25 – Mark Whiten

=== December ===
- December 1
  - Greg McMichael
  - Larry Walker
- December 4 – Darrell Sherman
- December 5 – Tony Beasley
- December 6 – Terry McDaniel
- December 10
  - Norberto Martin
  - Mel Rojas
- December 18 – Eric Cooper
- December 19 – Joe Slusarski
- December 20 – Jeff Mutis
- December 21 – Paul Swingle
- December 24 – Mo Sanford
- December 29 – Luis de los Santos
- December 30 – Kevin Long

== Deaths ==
=== January ===
- January 1 – Oscar Dugey, 78, light-hitting infielder who appeared in 193 games for the Boston Braves and Philadelphia Phillies between 1913 and 1920; member of 1914 world-champion "Miracle Braves" and 1915 Phillies, who captured their first National League pennant.
- January 3 – Luther Bonin, 77, outfielder for St. Louis of the American League and Buffalo of the "outlaw" Federal League who played 21 games in 1913–1914.
- January 10 – Andy Reese, 61, played every position but pitcher and catcher—although primarily a left fielder and third baseman—over the course of his 331-game career with the New York Giants of 1927–1930.
- January 14
  - John "Tacks" Neuer, 88, left-handed pitcher who won four of six decisions, with three shutouts and a 2.17 earned run average, in his lone MLB trial as a member of the 1907 New York Highlanders.
  - Sidney Weil, 74, owner of the Cincinnati Reds from 1929 to 1933.
- January 15
  - Stover McIlwain, 26, pitcher who appeared in two games as a teenager for the Chicago White Sox in 1957 and 1958.
  - Walt Walsh, 68, pinch runner for two games with the 1920 Philadelphia Phillies.
- January 20 – Leslie O'Connor, 76, lawyer and baseball executive; assistant to Commissioners of Baseball K. M. Landis (1921–1944) and Happy Chandler (1945); in between, acting commissioner as chairman of the MLB Advisory Council (1944–1945); subsequently general manager of Chicago White Sox (1945–1948) and president of Pacific Coast League (1956–1959).
- January 22 – Joel Newkirk, 69, pitcher who appeared in three games with the 1919–1920 Chicago Cubs.
- January 29 – Homer Summa, 67, right fielder who collected a .302 average over ten seasons with the Pittsburgh Pirates (1920), Cleveland Indians (1922–1928) and Philadelphia Athletics (1929–1930); member of two-time world champion Athletics.
- January 31 – Pat Donahue, 81, catcher who got into 119 games between 1908 and 1910 for the Boston Red Sox, Philadelphia Athletics and Cleveland Naps.

=== February ===
- February 2 – Ted Shaw, 59, left-hander who pitched for the Detroit Stars of the Negro National League from 1928 to 1930.
- February 4
  - Irvin Brooks, 74, outfielder for the Brooklyn Royal Giants of the Eastern Colored League from 1923 to 1927.
  - Mike Milosevich, 51, shortstop in 124 games for the 1944–1945 New York Yankees.
- February 8 – Gene Paulette, 74, who played in 500 big-league games, primarily as a first baseman, for the New York Giants, St. Louis Browns, St. Louis Cardinals and Philadelphia Phillies over six seasons between 1911 and 1920.
- February 10 – Willie Burns, 50, pitcher who hurled for seven different clubs over five seasons in the Negro leagues between 1935 and 1945.
- February 14
  - Jack Coffey, 79, infielder who played from 1909 to 1918 for the Boston Doves, Detroit Tigers and Boston Red Sox who was also a longtime baseball head coach at Fordham University.
  - Bill Stumpf, 73, infielder for New York of the American League, playing in 54 career games during 1912 and 1913.
- February 17 – Finners Quinlan, 78, outfielder who played 13 games for the 1913 St. Louis Cardinals and 42 more for the 1915 Chicago White Sox.
- February 18 – Marty McManus, 65, second baseman and third baseman who played 1,831 games from 1920 through 1934 for the St. Louis Browns, Detroit Tigers, Boston Red Sox and Boston Braves; player-manager of the Red Sox in 1932 and 1933.
- February 19 – Ed Mayweather, 56, two-time All-Star first baseman who played for three Negro leagues clubs, principally the Kansas City Monarchs and St. Louis Stars, between 1937 and 1942.
- February 20 – Harry Geisel, 77, American League umpire from 1925 to 1942 who worked in 2,554 regular-season games, two MLB All-Star Games (1935, 1938), and three World Series (1930, 1934, 1936).
- February 25 – Garland Braxton, 65, left-handed pitcher in 282 games for the Boston Braves, New York Yankees, Washington Senators, Chicago White Sox and St. Louis Browns between 1921 and 1933; led American League in earned run average (2.51) in 1928.

=== March ===
- March 4 – Jack Niemes, 46, southpaw relief pitcher who worked in three games for the 1943 Cincinnati Reds.
- March 6 – Dick Whitworth, 70, pitcher for the Chicago American Giants of the Negro National League in 1922 and 1924.
- March 9
  - Aaron Robinson, 50, All-Star catcher (1947) for the New York Yankees who succeeded Bill Dickey, then was replaced by Yogi Berra as the Bombers' starting receiver in 1948; played for the Chicago White Sox, Detroit Tigers and Boston Red Sox from 1948 through 1951.
  - Elmer Steele, 81, pitcher in 75 games for Boston of the American League and Pittsburgh and Brooklyn of the National League between 1907 and 1911.
- March 14 – Lee Magee, 76, outfielder-second baseman for seven big-league teams, principally the St. Louis Cardinals and New York Yankees, in the nine seasons of 1911–1919, appearing in 1,015 games; player-manager of Brooklyn Tip-Tops of the "outlaw" Federal League for most of 1915; known for bitter battles with owners, and accused them of "blackballing" him after 1919 season; implicated, with Hal Chase, in gambling allegations investigated by Cook County grand jury called in 1920 to probe the "Black Sox" scandal.
- March 15 – Chappie Geygan, 62, shortstop and third baseman who played in 40 games for the Boston Red Sox between 1924 and 1926.
- March 18 – Frank Bennett, 61, pitcher in five games for the Boston Red Sox (1927–1928).
- March 19 – Army Cooper, 66, pitcher who went 27–10 (3.98 ERA) for the Kansas City Monarchs of the Negro National League between 1928 and 1930.
- March 20 – "Jughandle Johnny" Morrison, 70, pitcher who won 103 career games for the Pittsburgh Pirates (1920–1927) and Brooklyn Robins (1929–1930); member of 1925 world champions.
- March 23 – Fred T. Long, 70, outfielder who played for Detroit (1920–1921, 1926) and Indianapolis (1925) of the Negro National League, then became a longtime and legendary head football coach at four historically black colleges in Texas and member of multiple college football and coaches halls of fame.
- March 24 – George O'Brien, 76, catcher who played in two games for the 1915 St. Louis Browns; later a football coach and athletic director of Mount Union College in Ohio.
- March 25 – Bill Morrisette, 71, pitcher who worked in 13 total games for the 1915–1916 Philadelphia Athletics and 1920 Detroit Tigers.
- March 29 – Ted Waters, 63, outfielder who played for Atlantic City, the Hilldale Club, and Philadelphia of the Eastern Colored League between 1925 and 1928.
- March 31 – Grady Adkins, 68, pitcher in 67 games for the 1928–1929 Chicago White Sox.

=== April ===
- April 1
  - John Sullivan, 76, outfielder who got into 162 total games for the Boston Braves (1920–1921) and Chicago Cubs (1921).
  - Sam B. Taylor, 68, first baseman for the 1926 Dayton Marcos of the Negro National League; known as a longtime (1924 to 1961) head football coach at historically black U.S. colleges.
- April 4 – Herb McQuaid, 67, relief pitcher for 1923 Cincinnati Reds and 1926 New York Yankees who made 29 career mound appearances.
- April 5 – Sam Dodge, 76, pitcher in four games for the 1921–1922 Boston Red Sox.
- April 6 – Rolla Mapel, 76, left-handed pitcher in four games for 1919 St. Louis Browns.
- April 7 – Ambrose Reid, 67, outfielder, second baseman and third baseman in the Negro leagues between 1921 and 1932 who played primarily for the Atlantic City Bacharach Giants of the Eastern Colored circuit.
- April 12
  - Gussie Gannon, 92, southpaw who hurled in one game for the 1895 Pittsburgh Pirates.
  - Joe Harris, 84, pitcher with the Boston Americans from 1905 to 1907; posted a 2–21 won–lost record in 1906, and followed that in 1907 by going 0–7; his career mark was 3–30 (.091 winning percentage) with a 3.35 earned run average.
- April 19 – Maury Kent, 80, pitcher in 23 games during 1912–1913 for Brooklyn of the National League; coached multiple sports (especially baseball) in U.S. colleges (notably Northwestern University) until 1943.
- April 22 – Lou Finney, 55, outfielder-first baseman who played in 1,270 games between 1931 and 1947 for the Philadelphia Athletics, Boston Red Sox, St. Louis Browns and Philadelphia Phillies.
- April 24 – Rinaldo Williams, 72, third baseman who played in four games for the 1914 Brooklyn Tip-Tops of the Federal League.
- April 25 – Art Decatur, 72, pitcher who appeared in 153 games between 1922 and 1927 for the Brooklyn Robins and Philadelphia Phillies.

=== May ===
- May 4 – Bob Elliott, 49, seven-time National League All-Star third baseman and 1947 NL Most Valuable Player whose 15-year MLB career (1939–1953) was primarily spent with the Pittsburgh Pirates and Boston Braves; manager of 1960 Kansas City Athletics.
- May 7 – Bing Miller, 71, outfielder who batted .311 in 1,820 games between 1921 and 1936 for the Washington Senators, Philadelphia Athletics, St. Louis Browns and Boston Red Sox, who won two World Series with the Athletics in 1929 and 1930; later a longtime coach.
- May 9 – Flame Delhi, 73, pitcher who worked in one game for the 1915 Chicago White Sox.
- May 14 – Tom Connolly, 73, third baseman/outfielder who appeared in 50 games for the 1915 Washington Senators.
- May 18 – Lee Gooch, 76, outfielder/pinch hitter in 19 total games played for the 1915 Cleveland Indians and 1917 Philadelphia Athletics.
- May 22 – Peewee Hauser, 77, 5 ft 6 in (1.68 m)-tall shortstop for the 1910–1913 St. Louis Cardinals and 1915 Chicago Whales (Federal League).
- May 26 – Bill Rumler, 75, catcher, outfielder and frequent pinch hitter who appeared in 139 games for the St. Louis Browns in 1914 and 1916–1917.
- May 29 – Hippo Vaughn, 78, left-handed pitcher who won 178 games for the New York Highlanders (1908; 1910–1912), Washington Senators (1912) and Chicago Cubs (1913–1921), including five 20-win-or-more seasons for the Cubs; known for the May 2, 1917, game in which he and Cincinnati pitcher Fred Toney each threw nine innings of no-hit ball; the "double no-hitter" ended in the tenth when Vaughn surrendered two hits and an unearned run, and Toney notched a 1–0 no-hit victory.
- May 30 – Dick Ward, 57, right-hander who hurled in four games for the 1934 Cubs and 1935 St. Louis Cardinals; posted a 25–9 won–lost mark for the 1934 Los Angeles Angels of the Pacific Coast League, one of the greatest minor league teams of all time.

=== June ===
- June 1 – Dick Cox, 70, outfielder who hit .314 with 261 hits in 246 games for the 1925–1926 Brooklyn Robins, his only two MLB campaigns.
- June 2 – Joe Casey, 78, reserve catcher/center fielder who appeared in 50 big-league games for the 1909–1911 Detroit Tigers and 1918 Washington Senators.
- June 4
  - Bernie Henderson, 67, who got into three games—two as a pitcher, one as a pinch hitter—for the 1921 Cleveland Indians.
  - Ralph McConnaughey, 76, pitcher who worked in seven games for the 1914 Indianapolis Hoosiers of the Federal League.
- June 8 – Jake Munch, 75, outfielder-first baseman in eight games for the 1918 Philadelphia Athletics.
- June 9 – Wilmer Ewell, 70, catcher who played 32 games from 1925 to 1926 for Indianapolis of the Negro National League.
- June 11 – Rube Curry, 67, pitcher who hurled in the Negro leagues between 1920 and 1933, notably for the Kansas City Monarchs, and member of three Negro World Series championship teams.
- June 14 – Bill Walker, 62, left-handed pitcher for the New York Giants (1927–1932) and St. Louis Cardinals (1933–1936); member of 1934 world champion "Gashouse Gang"; two-time National League earned-run average champion, 1929 (3.09) and 1931 (2.26).
- June 18 – Rollie Naylor, 74, pitcher for a succession of execrable Philadelphia Athletics teams, in 1917 and from 1919 through June 1924; lost 23 games in 1920.
- June 20 – Denney Wilie, 75, outfielder/pinch hitter for the 1911–1912 St. Louis Cardinals and 1915 Cleveland Indians.
- June 25 – Mose Solomon, 65, first baseman in two games for the 1923 New York Giants; minor-league slugger nicknamed "The Rabbi of Swat" and "The Jewish Babe Ruth".
- June 26 – Lil Stoner, 67, pitcher in 229 games in the majors, 217 of them with the Detroit Tigers, between 1922 and 1931.
- June 27 – Marty Krug, 77, third baseman who played for the Boston Red Sox (1912) and Chicago Cubs (1922); later, an MLB scout and minor-league manager.

=== July ===
- July 1 – Goldie Rapp, 72, third baseman who appeared in 276 games for the New York Giants and Philadelphia Phillies from 1921 to 1923.
- July 2 – Ormond Sampson, 56, Bahamian-born shortstop/outfielder for four Negro leagues clubs between 1932 and 1941.
- July 4 – Jesse Purnell, 85, third baseman who played seven games for the 1904 Philadelphia Phillies.
- July 5 – Pete Fox, 57, outfielder for the Detroit Tigers and Boston Red Sox who batted .298 lifetime in 1,461 games between 1933 and 1945; hit .327 for Tigers with 18 hits in 14 World Series games (1934, 1935, 1940), winning a ring in 1935.
- July 6 – Sad Sam Jones, 73, pitcher who enjoyed a 22-year career (1914–1935) in the majors, posting a 229–217 record in 647 games for the Cleveland Indians, Boston Red Sox, New York Yankees, Washington Senators, St. Louis Browns and Chicago White Sox; member of 1918 world champion Boston and 1923 world champion New York clubs.
- July 8 – George Branigan, 60, pitcher for the 1926 Cleveland Elites of the Negro National League.
- July 9 – Mule Suttles, 66, All-Star first baseman of the Negro leagues who hit the first home run in the East-West All-Star game.
- July 11 – Barney Lutz, 50, former minor league outfielder and manager; died while scouting a New York–Penn League game for the Baltimore Orioles.
- July 12 – Edgar Wesley, 75, first baseman for three Negro National League clubs, principally the Detroit Stars, between 1920 and 1927; led NNL in home runs (11) in 1920 and batting average (.404) in 1925.
- July 13 – Rip Vowinkel, 81, pitcher who worked in five games for the 1905 Cincinnati Reds.
- July 15 – Tommy McMillan, 78, shortstop for the Brooklyn Superbas, Cincinnati Reds and New York Highlanders between 1908 and 1912; played 22 years in minor leagues.
- July 16 – Elmer Yoter, 66, third baseman for the Philadelphia Athletics, Cleveland Indians and Chicago Cubs in 36 games over four seasons between 1921 and 1928; longtime minor league manager and MLB scout.
- July 18 – Roy Moran, 81, Washington Senators outfielder who played in seven games in September 1912.
- July 22 – Frank Delahanty, 83, light-hitting outfielder for New York (1905–1906) and Cleveland (1907) of the American League and Buffalo (1914) and Pittsburgh (1914–1915) of the "outlaw" Federal League; one of five Delahanty brothers to appear in the major leagues.
- July 28 – Hal Dixon, 46, National League umpire from 1953 through 1959; in his final season, led NL in ejections (13) and worked in 1959 World Series; during career, he officiated in 989 league games and 1957 All-Star tilt.
- July 30 – Harry Hedgpeth, 77, southpaw who threw one inning of one game for the Washington Senators on October 3, 1913.

=== August ===
- August 1 – Hank Gowdy, 76, catcher who appeared in 1,050 games in the National League, 852 with Boston and remaining 198 with New York, over 17 seasons spanning 1910 to 1930; member of 1914 "Miracle Braves", when he helped win the World Series by batting .545 with six hits (five for extra bases) in four games; later a longtime coach; the only MLB player to have served in both World Wars.
- August 3 – Earl Blackburn, 73, spare catcher for four NL teams, chiefly the Boston Braves, who got into 71 games over five seasons spanning 1912 to 1917.
- August 4 – Pug Cavet, 76, left-handed pitcher whose 23-year professional career included 49 games for the Detroit Tigers (1911 and 1914–1915); won 290 games (and lost 244) in minor leagues.
- August 8 – Taylor Sanford, 57, former minor-league infielder and manager and successful college baseball coach, who won 1955 NCAA baseball championship at the helm of the Wake Forest Demon Deacons.
- August 10 – Chuck Dressen, 71, incumbent manager of the Detroit Tigers since June 18, 1963, and pilot of four other MLB clubs dating to 1934; led the Brooklyn Dodgers to pennants in 1952–1953; in his playing days, a third baseman who appeared in 646 games for the Cincinnati Reds and New York Giants between 1925 and 1933; also a coach for a dozen seasons between 1939 and 1959; member of three World Series champions (1933, 1947, 1959).
- August 11 – Ellis Ryan, 62, principal owner of the Cleveland Indians from 1949 to 1952.
- August 15 – George J. Burns, 76, outfielder who played in 1,844 games between 1911 and 1925, primarily with the New York Giants; led the National League in runs and walks five times each.
- August 17 – Bill Allington, 62, manager who won four Championship Titles in the All-American Girls Professional Baseball League.
- August 24 – Wheezer Dell, 80, pitcher who appeared in 92 career games for the 1912 St. Louis Cardinals and 1915–1917 Brooklyn Robins.
- August 25
  - Ray Rolling, 79, second baseman in five games for 1912 St. Louis Cardinals.
  - Sam Zoldak, 47, left-handed pitcher who appeared in 250 games for the St. Louis Browns, Cleveland Indians and Philadelphia Athletics between 1944 and 1952.
- August 29
  - Al DeVormer, 75, catcher for the Chicago White Sox, New York Yankees, Boston Red Sox and New York Giants between 1918 and 1927.
  - Bobby Schang, 79, catcher whose 17-year pro career (1912–1928) was punctuated by getting into 82 major-league games with the Pittsburgh Pirates (1914–1915), New York Giants (1915) and St. Louis Cardinals (1927); brother of Wally Schang.

=== September ===
- September 2 – Bill McCabe, 73, reserve outfielder and frequent pinch runner who appeared in 106 games for the 1918–1920 Chicago Cubs and 1920 Brooklyn Robins; appeared in 1918 and 1920 World Series.
- September 5 – Frank Withrow, 75, backup catcher for the 1920 and 1922 Philadelphia Phillies.
- September 9 – Bob Kelley, 49, Los Angeles sportscaster and voice of the expansion Angels during their maiden 1961 season in the American League; longtime voice of NFL Rams.
- September 11 – Bill Cramer, 75, relief pitcher who allowed six hits and six runs—all of them unearned—in three innings pitched in his lone big-league appearance as a member of the Cincinnati Reds on June 25, 1912.
- September 12
  - Parson Perryman, 77, pitcher in 24 games for the 1915 St. Louis Browns.
  - Bill Summers, 70, American League umpire from 1933 to 1959 who worked in eight World Series and a record seven All-Star games.
- September 13 – Ralph Comstock, 78, pitched in the 1910s for the Detroit Tigers, Boston Red Sox, Pittsburgh Rebels (of the "outlaw" Federal League) and Pittsburgh Pirates.
- September 29 – Jack Rowan, 80, pitcher for four MLB teams over seven seasons between 1906 and 1914, chiefly as a member of the Cincinnati Reds.

=== October ===
- October 2 – Jumbo Brown, 59, a 295 lb (134 kg) pitcher who worked in 249 games, 226 in relief, for five MLB teams between 1925 and 1941; led National League in saves (not then an official statistic) in 1940 and 1941.
- October 4 – Mike Tresh, 52, catcher for the Chicago White Sox and Cleveland Indians from 1938 to 1949 and the father of New York Yankees' Tom Tresh.
- October 5
  - Harry Hanson, 70, catcher who played a single game, at age 17, for the Yankees on July 14, 1913.
  - John Reese, 71, outfielder who played in the Negro National League between 1920 and 1931, chiefly for the St. Louis Stars and Chicago American Giants.
- October 6 – Bill Henderson, 64, pitcher in three games for the 1930 New York Yankees.
- October 7 – George Magerkurth, 77, colorful and pugnacious National League umpire from 1929 to 1947 who worked in 2,814 NL games, four World Series and two All-Star games; ejected 101 men over the course of his career.
- October 10 – Patsy Gharrity, 74, catcher who appeared in 676 big-leagues games for the Washington Senators (1916–1923; 1929–1930); longtime batterymate of Hall of Fame pitcher Walter Johnson.
- October 11 – Red Smith, 76, solid third baseman for Brooklyn and Boston of the National League from 1911 through 1919; in his only year with Boston, he was a member of the 1914 World Series champion "Miracle Braves".
- October 17 – Bob Swift, 51, MLB catcher (1940–1953) for the St. Louis Browns, Philadelphia Athletics and Detroit Tigers who was behind the plate when the diminutive Eddie Gaedel made his famous appearance as a pinch hitter on August 19, 1951; later, a coach for three MLB teams and acting manager of the Tigers for parts of the 1965 and 1966 seasons.
- October 23
  - Fred Fussell, 71, left-handed pitcher who worked in 80 games for the Chicago Cubs (1922–1923) and Pittsburgh Pirates (1928–1929).
  - Jack Peerson, 56, shortstop/pinch hitter who batted .321 in 55 plate appearances for the 1935–1936 Philadelphia Athletics.
- October 26 – Bill "Crungy" Cronin, 63, catcher in 126 games for 1928–1931 Boston Braves, who played professionally for 23 seasons.
- October 29 – Al Grabowski, 65, pitcher who appeared in 39 total games for 1929–1930 St. Louis Cardinals.
- October 30
  - "Kewpie Dick" Barrett, 60, pitcher who appeared in 141 MLB games between 1933 and 1945 for four teams; legendary minor-league hurler, where he won 317 career games; seven-time 20-game winner for Seattle of the Pacific Coast League; The Sporting News' Minor League Player of the Year in 1942.
  - Rex Cecil, 50, pitcher in 18 games for the 1944–1945 Boston Red Sox, including the Bosox' starting assignment on Opening Day 1945.
  - Alex Pearson, 89, pitcher in 15 career games for the St. Louis Cardinals (1902) and Cleveland Naps (1903).
- October 31 – Elmer Johnson, 82, backup catcher for the 1914 New York Giants.

=== November ===
- November 2 – Lew Moren, 83, pitcher who worked in 141 games for the Pittsburgh Pirates (two total appearances in 1903–1904) and Philadelphia Phillies (139 games between 1907 and 1910).
- November 7 – Rube Bressler, 72, one of only a few players in major league baseball history to successfully convert from a pitcher to a position player as a first baseman/outfielder, who played for the Philadelphia Athletics and Phillies, Brooklyn Dodgers, Cincinnati Reds, and St. Louis Cardinals between 1914 and 1931.
- November 8 – James Buford, 59, infielder for three Negro National League clubs, principally the Nashville Elite Giants, between 1930 and 1933.
- November 12 – Mike Loan, 72, catcher who got into one MLB game on September 18, 1912, for his hometown Philadelphia Phillies.
- November 21 – Hack Miller, 53, catcher who appeared in only seven total games for the 1944–1945 Detroit Tigers, but homered in his first major-league at bat.
- November 24 – Tom Gulley, 66, outfielder who played briefly with 1923–1924 Cleveland Indians and 1926 Chicago White Sox.
- November 29 – Richard King, 62, first baseman who saw infrequent action as a member of the Cincinnati and Indianapolis Clowns of the Negro American League in 1943, 1945 and 1948.

=== December ===
- December 4 – Joe Willis, 76, left-hander who hurled for two of St. Louis' MLB teams, appearing in one game for the American League Browns (1911) and in 40 contests for the National League Cardinals (1911–1913).
- December 8 – Bill Bolden, 73, pitcher who made three appearances for the 1919 St. Louis Cardinals.
- December 10 – Emanuel Sampson, 56, outfielder with Cleveland (1940), Jacksonville (1941) and Birmingham (1941, 1946) of the Negro American League.
- December 11 – Cliff Fannin, 42, pitcher in 164 games for the St. Louis Browns between 1945 and 1952.
- December 12 – Herman Young, 80, third baseman/shortstop who played nine games for Boston of the National League in 1911.
- December 16 – Morrow Massey, 66, outfielder who batted .310 in his brief, 17-game tenure with the 1930 Louisville Black Caps of the Negro National League.
- December 20 – Doc Farrell, 64, utility infielder for six different teams between 1925 and 1935, including the Yankees' 1932 World Series champions.
