= Mel Rojas =

Dominican baseball player (born 1966)

- Pitcher
- Born: December 10, 1966 (age 59); Haina, Dominican Republic
- Batted: Right Threw: Right

MLB debut
- August 1, 1990, for the Montreal Expos

Last MLB appearance
- July 1, 1999, for the Montreal Expos

MLB statistics
- Won–loss record: 34–31
- Earned run average: 3.82
- Strikeouts: 562
- Saves: 126
- Stats at Baseball Reference

Teams
- Montreal Expos (1990–1996); Chicago Cubs (1997); New York Mets (1997–1998); Los Angeles Dodgers (1999); Detroit Tigers (1999); Montreal Expos (1999)

Melquíades Rojas Medrano (born December 10, 1966) is a Dominican former Major League Baseball (MLB) relief pitcher. From 1990 to 1999, he played for the Montreal Expos, Chicago Cubs, New York Mets and Los Angeles Dodgers of the National League and the Detroit Tigers of the American League.

== Career ==
His best season was in 1992, when he posted a 7-1 record in 68 relief appearances. Rojas had an amazing 1.43 ERA in 100.2 innings, and a WHIP of 1.043. He primarily was the set up man for closer John Wetteland (37 saves in 1992), but Rojas was able to accumulate 10 saves that season.

On May 11, 1994, Rojas struck out three batters on nine pitches in the ninth inning of a 4-3 win over the New York Mets. Rojas became the 19th National League pitcher and the 28th pitcher in major-league history to accomplish an immaculate inning.

Mel Rojas joined the Sinon Bulls of the Chinese Professional Baseball League in Taiwan in 2004, played 11 games, posted 3 saves with 1.20 ERA and 14 strikeouts in 15 innings, but then was released by the team after the season ended.

== Personal life ==
Mel Rojas is the nephew of Felipe, Jesús, and Matty Alou and the cousin of Moisés Alou.

Mel Rojas' son, Mel Rojas Jr. was selected 84th overall in the 2010 Major League Baseball draft by the Pittsburgh Pirates. He played for the KT Wiz of the KBO League from 2017 until 2020, winning the league MVP in 2020. He is currently again playing for the KT Wiz after playing for the Hanshin Tigers of the NPB.

== See also ==
- Alou family
