= Moisés Alou =

American baseball player (born 1966)

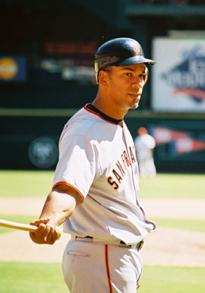
- Alou with the San Francisco Giants in 2005
- Outfielder
- Born: July 3, 1966 (age 60); Atlanta, Georgia, U.S.
- Batted: Right Threw: Right

MLB debut
- July 26, 1990, for the Pittsburgh Pirates

Last MLB appearance
- June 10, 2008, for the New York Mets

MLB statistics
- Batting average: .303
- Hits: 2,134
- Home runs: 332
- Runs batted in: 1,287
- Stats at Baseball Reference

Teams
- Pittsburgh Pirates (1990); Montreal Expos (1990, 1992–1996); Florida Marlins (1997); Houston Astros (1998, 2000–2001); Chicago Cubs (2002–2004); San Francisco Giants (2005–2006); New York Mets (2007–2008)

Career highlights and awards
- 6× All-Star (1994, 1997, 1998, 2001, 2004, 2005); World Series champion (1997); 2× Silver Slugger Award (1994, 1998)

Moisés Alou (/ˈmɔɪzɪs əˈluː/; Spanish: [mojˈses aˈlow]; born July 3, 1966) is an American former professional baseball outfielder who has played 17 seasons in Major League Baseball (MLB) from 1990 to 2008. He played in MLB for the Pittsburgh Pirates, Montreal Expos, Florida Marlins, Houston Astros, Chicago Cubs, San Francisco Giants, and New York Mets.

He is a member of one of the sport's most notable families of the late 20th century, being the son of famed first baseman and manager Felipe Alou. Known mainly for his offensive abilities, Alou was a six-time All-Star, a two-time Silver Slugger Award winner, and a 1997 World Series champion.

== Baseball career ==
Alou was more interested in playing basketball during his youth and did not play organized baseball until he attended Cañada College in Redwood City, California, at the age of 18. It was there that baseball scouts noticed his bat speed and speed on the base paths. In 1986, Alou was the second overall pick in the MLB January Draft, chosen by the Pittsburgh Pirates.

Alou is one of the few modern baseball players who hit without batting gloves. Instead, he would urinate on his hands to toughen them up.

=== Montreal Expos ===
In 1990, he was traded to the Montreal Expos where he would later play under his father while he managed the Expos.

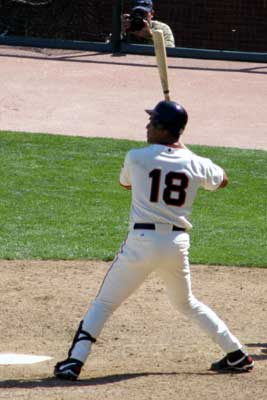
Alou's unusual batting stance

Alou suffered a severe ankle injury in 1993 that would rob him of his speed and force him to become strictly a corner outfielder. He recovered in 1994, hitting .339 and had the game-winning hit in that year's All-Star Game. For the next two seasons, he would enjoy success at the plate in Montreal, although surgery to both shoulders prematurely ended his 1995 season.

=== Florida Marlins ===
Prior to the 1997 season, Alou signed as a free agent with the Florida Marlins, where he led the team with 23 home runs and 115 RBIs. The Marlins made the playoffs as a wild card team and defeated the San Francisco Giants in the National League Divisional Series. The Marlins then defeated the Atlanta Braves in the National League Championship Series before going to the World Series, which Florida won in seven games over the then Cleveland Indians. Alou led the team by hitting .321 with 3 home runs and 9 RBI in the World Series (although, pitcher Liván Hernández, by virtue of his wins in Games 1 and 5, was named the Series Most Valuable Player instead).

=== Houston Astros ===
Before the 1998 season, the Marlins traded Alou to the Houston Astros. In his first season with the team, Alou hit a career-high 38 home runs and drove in 124 runs while leading the Astros to a then-franchise record 102 wins. However, he tore his anterior cruciate ligament (ACL) in a treadmill accident in the offseason and missed the entire 1999 season. Once recovered, he returned to the Astros lineup to hit .355 in 2000 and .331 in 2001, while driving in at least 108 runs in each season. After the 2001 season, the Astros did not offer Alou a new contract due to budget constraints, making him a free agent.

=== Chicago Cubs ===
In December 2001, he signed a three-year, $27 million contract with the Chicago Cubs.

At the start of the 2002 season Alou again ended up on the disabled list, and once healthy, he hit .275 and 15 home runs. After the 2002 season, Alou hired a personal trainer and dedicated himself to returning to his old form. In the 2003 season, Alou batted over .300 for most of the season before a late-season slump dropped his season batting average to .280, with 22 home runs and 91 RBI. Alou went on to lead the team in batting average in its two series against the Atlanta Braves and Florida Marlins.

In Game 6 of the National League Championship Series against the Florida Marlins that year, Alou was involved in the Steve Bartman incident, in which Cubs fan Steve Bartman deflected a foul ball landing one row into the Wrigley Field seats, where Bartman's deflection prevented Alou, who reached into the stands, from attempting to catch the ball for an out that could have been the second out of the 8th Inning. However, the Marlins went on to score eight runs in the inning, in which the Cubs had been ahead 3–0. The Cubs, who had led the series 3–2, lost the game 8–3 and eventually lost the series in 7 games. Alou openly admitted later in interviews that while he was frustrated at the moment, he would not have been able to make the catch anyway. Later, Alou denied making such a statement and said if he had, it was only to make Bartman feel better.

In 2004, Alou set new career highs in home runs (39) and doubles (36), while driving in 106 runs. However, the Cubs missed the playoffs after losing seven of their last nine games. The Cubs refused to offer arbitration and let him go, citing numerous fights with umpires who, he claimed, had a vendetta against him.

=== San Francisco Giants and New York Mets ===
In October 2004, Alou announced he had talked to his father, Felipe, about possibly playing for him and the Giants next season. In December 2004, he signed a one-year deal with the Giants worth $13.5 million, with a player option for a second year. Alou was expected to regularly play in right field for the first time since 2001, although due to injuries to left fielder Barry Bonds, he started most games in left field. Alou had stated he would retire if the Giants won the World Series in 2005. They did not, and Alou exercised his option to stay with San Francisco in the 2006 season, hitting 22 home runs to go with 74 RBI.

On November 20, 2006, the New York Mets signed Alou to a one-year contract worth $7.5 million with a club option for 2008. After hitting .318 in his first month as the regular left fielder, Alou suffered a torn quadriceps muscle and was forced out until August. Upon his return, Alou led the Mets with a .345 batting average and had a 30-game hitting streak. The streak was the longest streak of the 2007 season, was the longest hitting streak by a player over age 40, and broke the Mets' overall and single-season hitting streak records. On October 31, 2007, the Mets exercised their option on Alou's contract for the 2008 season.

On March 5, 2008, Alou underwent hernia surgery and missed the start of the 2008 season. On July 9, Alou suffered a torn right hamstring playing in the outfield for Double-A Binghamton in Norwich, Connecticut. Mets general manager Omar Minaya stated in a press conference the following day Alou would likely need surgery and miss the remainder of the 2008 season, which ended his MLB career.

On March 5, 2009, Alou announced he would retire after that year's World Baseball Classic.

=== Post-playing career ===
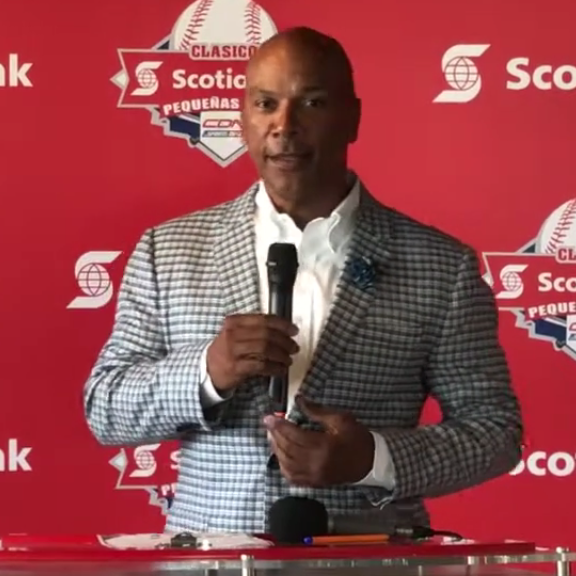
Alou in 2019

In 2009, Alou was hired as the general manager of the Leones del Escogido of LIDOM. In his first four seasons, his team won three LIDOM championships and two Caribbean Series titles. In 2013, he was general manager of the Dominican Republic national team that won the 2013 World Baseball Classic.

In 2014, in his first year of Hall of Fame eligibility, Alou received six votes (1.1%) and was dropped from subsequent ballots.

== Personal life ==
He is the youngest of three sons born to Felipe and his first wife Maria Beltre, who raised him in the Dominican Republic after his parents divorced when he was two.

His father Felipe, who managed Moises with the Expos from 1992 to 1996 and the Giants from 2005 to 2006, as well as uncles Matty and Jesús, and cousin Mel Rojas, all had long careers in Major League Baseball. In 2008, he was one of four active major leaguers (along with Prince Fielder, Ken Griffey Jr., and Daryle Ward) to hit 20 home runs in a season whose fathers had also hit 20 home runs in an MLB season.

His half-brother, Luis Rojas, was the manager of the New York Mets in 2020 and 2021.

== See also ==
- Alou family
- Houston Astros award winners and league leaders
- List of Dominican Americans
- List of Houston Astros team records
- List of Major League Baseball career doubles leaders
- List of Major League Baseball career games played as a left fielder leaders
- List of Major League Baseball career hits leaders
- List of Major League Baseball career home run leaders
- List of Major League Baseball career putouts as a left fielder leaders
- List of Major League Baseball career runs scored leaders
- List of Major League Baseball career runs batted in leaders
- List of Major League Baseball career slugging percentage leaders
- List of Major League Baseball players from the Dominican Republic
- List of second-generation Major League Baseball players
