= Luis Rojas (baseball) =

Dominican baseball coach and manager (born 1981)

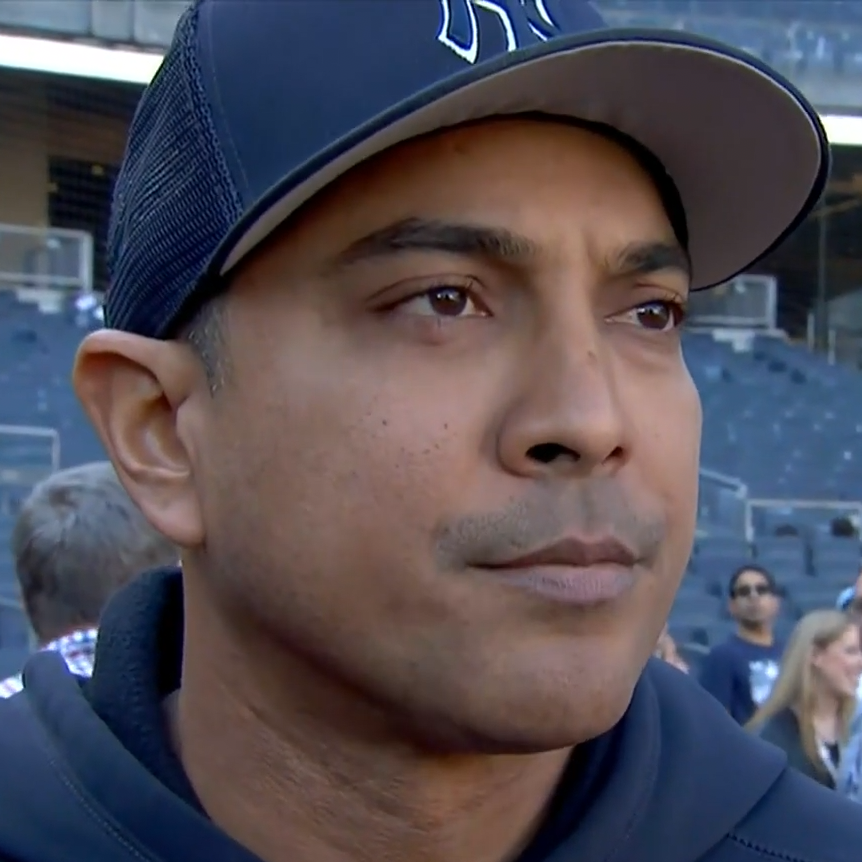
- Rojas with the Yankees in 2022

New York Yankees – No. 67
- Coach
- Born: September 1, 1981 (age 45); Santo Domingo, Dominican Republic
- Bats: Right Throws: Right

Career statistics
- Managerial record: 103–119
- Winning %: .464
- Stats at Baseball Reference

Teams
- As manager: New York Mets (2020–2021); As coach: New York Mets (2019); New York Yankees (2022–present)

Luis E. Rojas (born September 1, 1981) is a Dominican professional baseball coach and manager. After coaching for the New York Mets of Major League Baseball (MLB) in 2019, he managed the Mets from 2020 to 2021. Rojas joined the New York Yankees as third base coach after the 2021 season. He is the son of Felipe Alou, a former MLB player and manager.

== Playing career ==
Rojas grew up shagging fly balls, taking batting practice and running bases in Montreal as his father, Felipe Alou, managed the Montreal Expos. After graduating from a Catholic high school, Rojas was signed in 1999 as a third baseman by the Baltimore Orioles for $300,000. He spent time in the Miami Marlins system and then the Montreal Expos/Washington Nationals system. He spent the 2004 season as an infielder/outfielder with the Gulf Coast League Expos of minor league baseball. "Luis had talent," said his father, Felipe Alou. "He was a good-looking prospect, but he got hurt and had shoulder problems and he was never the player they thought he was gonna be."

== Coaching career ==
=== Early coaching career ===
Rojas began his coaching career with the Dominican Summer League Nationals in 2006. The New York Mets hired him as a coach for the Dominican Summer League Mets in 2007 and for the Gulf Coast League Mets in 2008. He became a coach for the Savannah Sand Gnats in 2010 but transferred back to manage the Gulf Coast League Mets in 2011. On his return to Savannah from 2012 through 2014, Rojas won the 2013 South Atlantic League championship and was named Manager of the Year the following season. Afterwards, Rojas became the manager for the St. Lucie Mets and led them to the top of their division.

Rojas managed in the Dominican Professional Baseball League team Leones del Escogido. He led the team to a league championship in the following 2015–16 season. Rojas managed the Binghamton Rumble Ponies in 2017 and 2018. The Mets named him to their major league coaching staff as the quality control coach for the 2019 season.

=== New York Mets manager ===
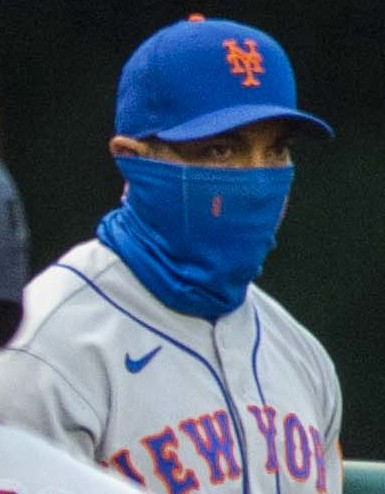
Rojas with the Mets in 2020

Rojas was promoted to manager by Mets general manager Brodie Van Wagenen on January 22, 2020, after the Mets mutually parted ways with Carlos Beltrán due to his involvement in the Houston Astros sign stealing scandal. In his first year as manager, the Mets finished the regular season 26–34, tied for last place in their division. Van Wagenen lost his job at the end of the pandemic-shortened season and was replaced by Sandy Alderson, who had a long relationship with Rojas and kept him on.

On April 20, 2021, Rojas was ejected from a game for the first time in his Major League career after arguing balls and strikes with home plate umpire John Libka. On July 18, Rojas was ejected and subsequently suspended for two games by Major League Baseball for "excessive arguing" over a fair-foul call in the first inning of a game at PNC Park. It was the first time in his career that he had been suspended at any level of baseball.

The Mets declined the option on Rojas's contract on October 4, 2021, after concluding the season with a record of 77–85. The Mets were the first team in major league history to sit atop a division for more than 100 days in a season and finish with a losing record.

=== New York Yankees ===
On November 15, 2021, the New York Yankees hired Rojas as their third base coach. Rojas was a member of the staff that guided the Yankees to the 2024 World Series.

=== Managerial record ===
Team	Year	Regular season					Postseason			
Team	Year	Games	Won	Lost	Win %	Finish	Won	Lost	Win %	Result
NYM	2020	60	26	34	.433	4th in NL East				
NYM	2021	162	77	85	.475	3rd in NL East				
Total		222	103	119	.464					

== Personal life ==
Rojas is the son of former professional baseball player and manager Felipe Rojas Alou, as well as the half-brother of former outfielder Moisés Alou. Rojas is the ninth of 11 children Alou had via four marriages. Rojas' mother is Elsa Brens, Alou's third wife, a secretary for owners of the Dominican summer league. When Rojas was 3, his parents divorced.

In June 2021, he said: “Oh man, my father's been my university of life, not only of baseball. He's taught me a lot of things about baseball and life. He taught me how to be a good son. He taught me how to be a good father. He taught me how to be a good baseball man." The reason Luis and Felipe have different surnames is that when the San Francisco Giants' scout registered Felipe Rojas Alou's name, he used Felipe's mother's name, Alou, instead of his father's, Rojas.

Rojas and his wife, Laura, have one son, Luis Felipe.

He has been described as a "deeply religious, workout-obsessed, wine-sipping, dominoes-playing, baseball lifer."

== See also ==
- Alou family
