= Alou family =

Major League Baseball family

The Rojas family, more commonly known in English-speaking America by their matronym, Alou, is a prominent Major League Baseball family from the Dominican Republic. The family name in the Dominican Republic is the paternal family name of Rojas, but Felipe Alou and his brothers became known by the name Alou when the Giants' scout who signed Felipe mistakenly thought his matronym (Alou) was his surname. The Rojas Alou brothers' maternal grandfather, Mateu Alou, was an immigrant from Felanitx, Spain, who immigrated to the Dominican Republic in 1898.

Felipe Alou, the oldest of three brothers, was the first Dominican to play regularly in the Major Leagues. From 1958 to 1974, he played for the San Francisco Giants, Atlanta Braves, Oakland A's, and New York Yankees, and subsequently managed the Montreal Expos. He made the All-Star team three times and once finished 5th in the Most Valuable Player (MVP) voting. His younger brothers Matty and Jesús were both longtime National League outfielders. In 1963, while all playing for the San Francisco Giants, Felipe, Matty and Jesus became the first all brother outfield in the Major Leagues.

Felipe's son Moisés also had a long career as a Major League outfielder. Another son of Felipe, Luis Rojas, was the manager of the New York Mets for two years, and has held several other MLB coaching roles. José Sosa was also a member of the Alou family. Mel Rojas, a cousin of Moisés, pitched in MLB for ten seasons. Mel Rojas Jr. won the KBO League Most Valuable Player Award in 2020.
