= Jesús Alou =

Dominican baseball player (1942–2023)

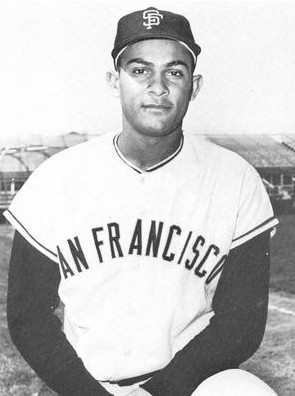
- Alou in 1965
- Outfielder
- Born: March 24, 1942; Bajos de Haina, Dominican Republic
- Died: March 10, 2023 (aged 80); Santo Domingo, Dominican Republic
- Batted: Right Threw: Right

MLB debut
- September 10, 1963, for the San Francisco Giants

Last MLB appearance
- September 29, 1979, for the Houston Astros

MLB statistics
- Batting average: .280
- Home runs: 32
- Runs batted in: 377
- Stats at Baseball Reference

Teams
- San Francisco Giants (1963–1968); Houston Astros (1969–1973); Oakland Athletics (1973–1974); New York Mets (1975); Houston Astros (1978–1979)

Career highlights and awards
- 2× World Series champion (1973, 1974)

Jesús María Rojas Alou (Spanish: [xeˈsus aˈlo], March 24, 1942 – March 10, 2023) was a Dominican professional baseball outfielder. During a 15-year Major League Baseball (MLB) career, he played for the San Francisco Giants (1963–68), the Houston Astros (1969–73; 1978–79), the Oakland Athletics (1973–74), and the New York Mets (1975). He was the youngest of a trio of baseball-playing brothers that included Felipe and Matty.

== Early life ==
Alou was born on March 24, 1942, in Bajos de Haina, Dominican Republic. His father was a carpenter and blacksmith, but the family was poor. Alou had three brothers and two sisters. He attended Santo Domingo Escuela in Santo Domingo, eight miles from his home. At 16-years old, he was scouted by Horacio Martinez for the San Francisco Giants. He signed as an amateur free agent with the Giants on August 25, 1958, for a $1,500 bonus (well under the $4,000 minimum) and $200/month salary. He was originally signed as a pitcher.

At that time, his oldest brother Felipe Alou (23-years old) was a rookie with the Giants, and his 19-year old brother Matty Alou played in the Giants farm system. They also had a younger brother, Juan Alou, four years younger than Jesús, who went on to become an engineer. The Alous' mother originally wanted her sons to choose school over baseball, but when Felipe signed for a $500 bonus and $200/month salary, she saw how this money could help the family to a more stable life. Matty later signed for a $500 bonus and $175/month in salary.

As children, the Alous' father Jose made their baseball bats himself on a wood lathe. The brothers should have been known as Rojas, but when Felipe was erroneously called Alou when entering the Giants organization, he did not correct it. The other two brothers followed suit when they came to the United States and joined the Giants team, which was already calling their oldest brother Alou. The naming error bothered their father for a time.

In addition to his brothers Felipe and Matty, the Alou family in Major League Baseball includes his nephew Moisés Alou, Felipe's son.

== Playing career ==
=== Minor leagues ===
Alou began his professional career in 1959 with the Rookie League Hastings Giants, appearing in four games with three at bats. He had some arm trouble at that time, limiting his play and prospects as a pitcher. In 1960, he played the majority of the season with the Class D Artesia Giants of the Sophomore League. He had a .352 batting average (second best in the Sophomore League), with 11 home runs, 91 runs batted in (RBI) and 102 runs scored. He struck out only 38 times in 534 at bats, and had an .869 OPS (on-base plus slugging). He was converted from a pitcher to an outfielder by manager George Genovese.

In 1961, the Giants assigned Alou to the Class B Eugene Emeralds of the Northwest League. He hit .336, with 10 home runs, 71 RBIs, 82 runs scored and an .841 OPS. He struck out only 19 times in 518 at bats. He was second in the league in batting average for players with over 400 at bats, and in the top 10 players in runs scored and RBIs. His 19 strikeouts were fewest among players with over 170 at bats.

During the 1961 Dominican Winter League season, the three brothers played together, Felipe batting .345 and playing right field, Jesús hitting .332 in centerfield, and Matty hit .313 playing left field.

In 1962, he was assigned to the El Paso Sun Kings of the Double-A Texas League, with Genovese as his manager once again. By mid-July, he had consecutive game hitting streaks of 13, 25 and 23 games, and was selected to play in the Texas League All-Star game. On the season, he hit .343, with 11 home runs, 68 RBI, 97 runs scored and an .893 OPS. He struck out only 20 times in 505 at bats. His batting average was second best in the Texas League among players with more than 330 at bats, and his 20 strikeouts were the fewest of any player with over 278 at bats. He was sixth in runs scored. Genovese said Jesús was faster than his two brothers, and had the potential to be a better hitter because of his ability to hit the ball to all fields. He had also improved over time as an outfielder.

Carl Hubbell, director of the Giants' minor league system, thought it wisest to bring Alou up gradually (especially with Willie Mays ahead of him at the Giants). Alou played for the Triple-A Tacoma Giants of the Pacific Coast League in 1963. He had a .324 batting average, with 11 home runs, 69 RBIs, 102 runs scored and .783 OPS. He struck out 47 times in 648 at bats. He was 6 ft 2 in (1.88 m) 185 lb. (83.9 kg) or 6 ft 3 in (1.91 m) 191 lb. (86.6 kg), and continued to live in the Dominican Republic in the offseason.

=== San Francisco Giants ===
Alou was considered a better prospect than either of his brothers. He made his major league debut with the Giants late in the 1963 season. He appeared in 16 games; hitting .250 in 24 at bats. In his first game, on September 10, all three Alou brothers batted in the same inning (they were retired in order). This was the first time three brothers batted in the same inning in Major League history. Five days later, for the first time, the three played in the outfield for the Giants at the same time. The latter achievement happened in the last two innings of a 13–5 win over the Pittsburgh Pirates at Forbes Field, with starting right fielder Felipe first moving to left in the seventh inning when Jesús entered the game in right and then to center in the eighth when Matty was inserted in left. The brothers would not have an opportunity to play together again for the same team, as the Giants traded Felipe Alou in December 1963 to the Milwaukee Braves.

In 1964, his first full year in the Major Leagues, Alou started 83 games in the outfield for the Giants, mostly in right field. He batted .274 in 376 at bats, with three home runs, 11 doubles, 28 RBI and 42 runs scored. On July 10, he went 6-for-6 with five singles and a home run, getting his six hits against six different Chicago Cubs pitchers. His brother Matty played in the game as well, but was 0–5.

In 1965, Alou had career highs in games (143), at bats (543), hits (162), runs (76), RBIs (52) and home runs (9). He hit .298, with a .715 OPS, and struck out only 40 times. Matty was traded to the Pittsburgh Pirates after the 1965 season ended, where he became one of the best hitters in Major League Baseball for the next five years. Alou was plagued by injuries in 1966 with an injured arm and/or hand early in the Spring that took months to recover; playing in only 110 games that year, with 370 at bats, a .259 batting average and one home run. He was also sent to the Triple-A Phoenix Giants that season, where he played in 10 games. He asked to be traded at one point, but was convinced by the team that he could be a starter again in 1967. Adding to his frustration was the success of Matty, who led all Major League hitters with a .342 batting average, and Felipe who was second in the Major Leagues with a .327 batting average.

In 1967, he started 116 games between left and right field, batting a team-leading .292, in 510 at bats. He had five home runs, 30 RBIs and 55 runs scored. In 1968, he batted .263 in 419 at bats, with no home runs, 39 RBIs and 26 runs. The Giants left him exposed in the October 1968 expansion draft, and Alou was selected with the 13th overall pick by the Montreal Expos for their inaugural season. However, he never played for the Expos, as they traded him and Donn Clendenon in January 1969 to the Houston Astros for Rusty Staub. When Clendenon refused to join the Astros, the Expos replaced him with Jack Billingham, Skip Guinn and $100,000 that April.

=== Houston Astros ===
Alou hit .248 in 115 games for the Astros in 1969. On June 10, 1969, he was involved in one of the most frightening collisions in baseball history, in a game against the Pirates and his brother Matty. The Pirates Al Oliver hit a pop fly into shallow left field and both Alou coming in from the outfield and teammate Hector Torres going out from shortstop ran into each other in a head-to-head collision, both falling to the ground unconscious. The Pirates' athletic trainer Tony Bartirome reached Alou first, and saw Alou had swallowed his own tongue. Bartirome, soon assisted by Astros’ trainer Jim Ewell, pulled out Alou’s tongue and inserted a rubber tube to get him breathing again. Alou, who also had suffered a concussion and fractured jaw, was taken to the hospital and did not play again for a month. Brother Matty Alou came out to be with Alou after the collision, but finished the game before going to the hospital. Astros teammate Denis Menke said Alou looked like he was dead before the trainers’ intervention. Alou next played on July 18, 1969, going 2-for-3 with two runs scored.

Alou rebounded in the 1970 season, batting .306 in at 458 at bats (and 487 plate appearances), with a career-best 21 walks, but little power (only 1 homerun). He had 44 RBIs, 59 runs scored and struck out only 15 times. In 1971, he hit .279 in 433 at bats, with two home runs, 40 RBIs and 41 runs scored. In addition to Alou and the home run hitting Jim Wynn, the Astros 1971 outfield also included 25-year old Bob Watson (.288, nine home runs) and 20-year old Cesar Cedeño, who had led Major League Baseball in doubles (40), while batting .264 with ten home runs, 81 RBIs and 85 runs scored.

With the emergence of the younger Watson and Cedeño, Alou was no longer a regular outfielder after the 1971 season. While Watson (.312, 16 home runs, 86 RBIs) and Cedeño (.320, 55 stolen bases, 22 home runs, 82 RBI, 102 runs) started alongside Wynn in 1972, Alou was a reserve outfielder and pinch-hitter, batting .312 in 52 games and 96 at bats.

=== Oakland Athletics, New York Mets, Mexican League and Astros again ===
On July 31, 1973, the Astros traded Alou to the Oakland Athletics for a player to be named later. At the time of the trade, he had played in only 28 games, batting .236 with eight RBIs. He served as a bench player for the Athletics on two World Series championship teams. He hit .306 in 108 at bats for the A's in 1973, and .268 in 220 at bats in 1974. In the 1973 American League Championship Series against the Baltimore Orioles, he was two-for-six with one RBIs. He appeared in all seven games of the 1973 World Series victory over the New York Mets, batting .158 with a double and three RBIs. He went 3-for-6 with two RBIs in a Game 2 loss to the Mets. He went one-for-one in the 1974 American League Championship Series, and 0-for-1 in the 1974 World Series win over the Los Angeles Dodgers.

Alou was released by the Athletics towards the end of March 1975, before the start of the 1975 season, and he signed with the New York Mets on April 10. He batted .265 in 102 at bats, often as a pinch hitter for the Mets. He played 20 games in the outfield, starting 15. The Mets released Alou before the 1976 season. In 1976, Alou played for Cafeteros de Córdoba of the Mexican League, where he hit .262 in 39 games. Houston once again signed Alou in December 1977, where he played in 1978 and 1979. He responded in 1978 by hitting .324 in part-time action and became a player-coach the following year before retiring.

== Legacy and honors ==
During his 1975 season with the Mets, the Alou brothers' combined total career games played reached over 5,000 games. By that point, Felipe was retired and Matty was playing in Japan. This total surpassed the Waner brothers (Lloyd and Paul), the DiMaggio brothers (Joe, Dominic and Vince) and the Boyer brothers (Ken, Clete and Cloyd), among others. In an April 2025 analysis of brothers' combined WAR (wins above replacement), the Alous were ranked sixth.

Alou attributed his talent for not striking out to a backyard game he played with his brothers as children, involving hitting a rubber ball instead of a baseball. As long as they did not strike out, they could keep batting. Alou only struck out only 267 times in 4,345 at bats (16.27 at bats per strikeout) during his Major League career; and Matty Alou only struck out 377 times in 5,789 at bats (15.36). Felipe, who was more of a power hitter (206 career home runs compared to 31 for Matty and 32 for Jesús), struck out only 706 times in 7,339 at bats (10.40). Alou ranks 237th all time in at bat to strikeout ratio, Matty Alou ranks 287th, and Felipe ranks 627th. By contrast, among their three Hall of Fame 1963 Giants teammates, Orlando Cepeda struck out 1,169 times in 7,927 at bats (6.78); Willie Mays struck out 1,526 times in 10,924 at bats (7.16); and Willie McCovey struck out 1,550 times in 8,197 at bats (5.29).

Alou was awarded the Hispanic Heritage Baseball Museum Hall of Fame Pioneer Award at a pre-game ceremony at Minute Maid Park, on September 23, 2008.

== Post-playing career ==
Alou later served as a scout for the Expos, then moved to the Florida Marlins as the club's director of Dominican operations. He held the same post with the Boston Red Sox from 2002 through 2017, then moved to a part-time role as special assistant and then ambassador to the Red Sox' international scouting and player development department through 2020.

== Personal life and death ==
Alou married Angela Hanley. They had five children and lived in the Dominican Republic.

Alou died on March 10, 2023, at age 80.

== See also ==
- Alou family
- List of Major League Baseball players from the Dominican Republic
- List of Major League Baseball single-game hits leaders
