= Ted Waters =

American baseball player

- Outfielder
- Born: November 17, 1902; Marion, Maryland, U.S.
- Died: March 29, 1966 (aged 63); Philadelphia, Pennsylvania, U.S.

Negro league baseball debut
- 1925, for the Bacharach Giants

Last appearance
- 1928, for the Philadelphia Tigers

Teams
- Bacharach Giants (1925); Hilldale Club (1927); Philadelphia Tigers (1928)

Theodore Francis Mullen Waters (November 17, 1902 – March 29, 1966) was an American Negro league outfielder in the 1920s.

A native of Marion, Maryland, Waters made his Negro leagues debut in 1925 with the Bacharach Giants. He went on to play for the Hilldale Club and the Philadelphia Tigers. Waters died in Philadelphia, Pennsylvania in 1966 at age 63.
