= George Branigan =

American baseball player

- Pitcher
- Born: August 21, 1905; Corona, Alabama, U.S.
- Died: July 8, 1966 (aged 60); Cleveland, Ohio, U.S.
- Batted: Unknown Threw: Right

Negro league baseball debut
- 1926, for the Cleveland Elites

Last appearance
- 1926, for the Cleveland Elites
- Stats at Baseball Reference

Teams
- Cleveland Elites (1926)

Planter George Branigan (August 21, 1905 – July 8, 1966) was an American professional baseball pitcher in the Negro leagues. He played with the Cleveland Elites in 1926.
