= Felipe Alou =

Dominican baseball player and manager (born 1935)

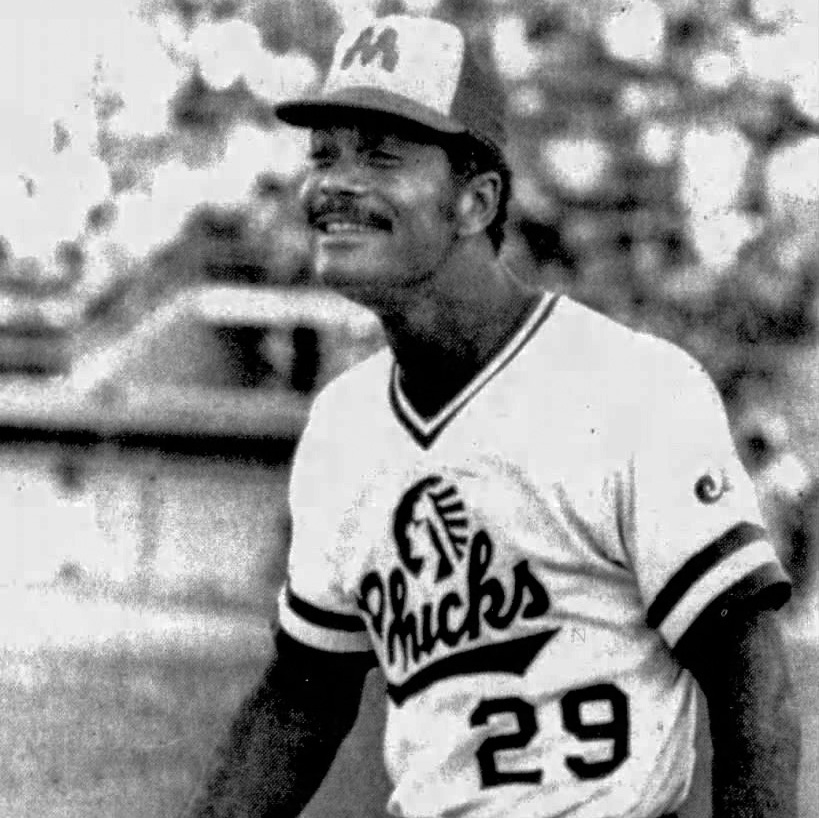
- Alou in 1978
- Outfielder / First baseman / Manager
- Born: May 12, 1935 (age 91); Haina, Dominican Republic
- Batted: Right Threw: Right

MLB debut
- June 8, 1958, for the San Francisco Giants

Last MLB appearance
- April 24, 1974, for the Milwaukee Brewers

MLB statistics
- Batting average: .286
- Hits: 2,101
- Home runs: 206
- Runs batted in: 852
- Managerial record: 1,033–1,021
- Winning %: .503
- Stats at Baseball Reference
- Managerial record at Baseball Reference

Teams
- As player: San Francisco Giants (1958–1963); Milwaukee / Atlanta Braves (1964–1969); Oakland Athletics (1970–1971); New York Yankees (1971–1973); Montreal Expos (1973); Milwaukee Brewers (1974); As manager: Montreal Expos (1992–2001); San Francisco Giants (2003–2006); As coach: Montreal Expos (1979–1980, 1984); Detroit Tigers (2002)

Career highlights and awards
- 3× All-Star (1962, 1966, 1968); NL Manager of the Year (1994); San Francisco Giants Wall of Fame

Member of the Canadian

Baseball Hall of Fame
- Induction: 2015
Medals
Men's baseball
Representing Dominican Republic
Pan American Games
Gold medal – first place	1955 Mexico City	Team

Felipe Rojas Alou (born May 12, 1935) is a Dominican former professional outfielder, first baseman, coach and manager in Major League Baseball (MLB). The first Dominican to play regularly in the major leagues, he is the oldest of the trio of baseball-playing brothers that included Matty and Jesús, who were both primarily outfielders.

During his 17-year career spent with the San Francisco Giants, Milwaukee / Atlanta Braves, Oakland Athletics, New York Yankees, Montreal Expos, and Milwaukee Brewers, Alou played all three outfield positions regularly (736 games in right field, 483 in center, 433 in left), and led the National League twice in hits and once in runs. Batting regularly in the leadoff spot, he hit a home run to begin a game on 20 occasions.

Following his retirement, Alou managed the Montreal Expos (1992–2001) and the San Francisco Giants (2003–2006). On February 4, 2015, Alou was elected to the Canadian Baseball Hall of Fame, and in 2016, he was inducted in the Caribbean Baseball Hall of Fame. He is one of just three men to have 2,000 hits, 200 home runs, and 1,000 managerial wins (the other two are Joe Torre and Frank Robinson).

Alou's son Moisés also played in MLB, primarily as an outfielder. His son Luis, in turn, managed the New York Mets. (Note: The family name in the Dominican Republic is Rojas, but Felipe Alou and his brothers became known by the name Alou when the Giants' scout who signed Felipe mistakenly thought his matronymic was his father's name.)

== Early life ==
Felipe Rojas Alou was born on May 12, 1935, in Haina, Dominican Republic. Born into the Alou family, Alou lived in poverty in the Dominican Republic, but his parents dreamed of his escaping poverty by having him aim to be a doctor. He was proficient in sports from a young age, having run on the track team for the Dominican national team. He entered the University of Santo Domingo in 1954 as a premedical student. He played baseball in college team while getting ready for the 1955 Pan American Games (held in March), aiming for track. However, at the last minute, he was switched to the baseball roster. The Dominican team would win the gold. He planned to stay with his studies, but he attracted interest in baseball due to his university coach, who had served as a scout with the Giants.

== Professional career ==
=== Minor leagues ===
In November 1955, he signed with the New York Giants for $200 due to family financial problems. Alou began his minor league baseball career in the Evangeline Baseball League in 1956. Prior to the season, however, the city of Baton Rouge, Louisiana banned Negroes from playing in its public parks, including the ballpark used by the Baton Rouge Rebels. After initially negotiating a resolution whereby Alou and other Negro Lake Charles Giants players would be held out of games in Baton Rouge in exchange for the Rebels at the same positions also being benched, pressure began to mount for the Lake Charles club to cut Alou and his Negro teammates altogether. Lake Charles was forced to forfeit at least one game and other games were moved from Baton Rouge to Lake Charles. In early May, Alou was reassigned to the Cocoa club of the Florida State League and the Evangeline League achieved total racial segregation.

=== San Francisco Giants (1958–1963) ===
Alou made his major league debut at the age of 23 on June 8, 1958. He went 2-for-3 while driving in a run. He played sparingly in his first three seasons, playing 276 total games (with 199 hits) in his first three combined seasons (primarily in the outfield while spending a bit of time pinch-hitting); he walked 52 times while striking out 114 times. He played in 132 games for the 1961 squad and batted .289 while collecting 120 hits with eighteen home runs.

Felipe was joined by his brothers, Matty in 1960, and Jesús in 1963. All three formed the first and only all-brother outfield in MLB history in the last two innings of a 13–5 win over the Pittsburgh Pirates at Forbes Field on September 15, 1963. Felipe was the starting right fielder but first moved to left in the seventh inning when Jesús entered the game in right and then to center in the eighth when Matty was inserted in left.

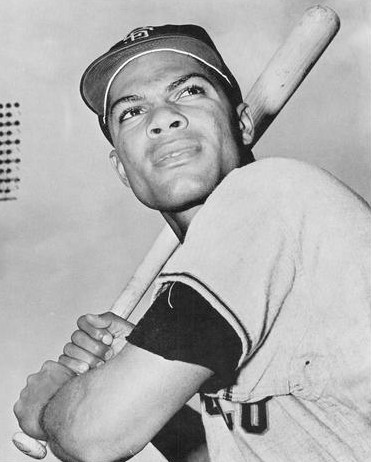
Alou with the Giants in 1961.

1962 was his fifth season with the Giants. It would also be his first All-Star season along with the first time he would reach the postseason. He played 154 games while being named to the 1962 All-Star Game (first game); he batted .316 while slugging 25 home runs with 98 runs batted in (RBI) The Giants won 101 games in the National League to force a tie-breaker series with the Los Angeles Dodgers (a best-of-three series counted as regular season games). In the ninth inning of the third game, the Giants trailed 4–2 with Ed Roebuck pitching. Matty Alou started the inning with a single, and Felipe later came to bat with two on base and one out. Alou would draw a walk on six pitches to load the bases. The next batter, Willie Mays, lined a shot through the pitcher for a run, before Orlando Cepeda drove in a run on a sacrifice fly to tie the game; Jim Davenport would draw a walk with the bases loaded again to score Alou as the third of four runs scored by the Giants in the inning on their way to a 6–4 victory. This meant the Giants had won their first NL pennant since 1954 and first since the move to San Francisco. Alou and his Giants were matched against the New York Yankees (winners of the last World Series). In a seven-game series, he batted .269 (collecting seven hits). However, it was the play that he did not make that "haunted" him. In Game 7, the Giants were trailing 1–0 in the bottom of the ninth inning with a batter on. Alou was instructed to bunt against pitcher Ralph Terry. However, the bunt moved foul on the first base line. He then hit a foul ball on a called hit-and-run play before striking out. This proved key on the final out of the game, when Willie Mays hit a two-out double before Willie McCovey committed the last out with batters on third and second; Alou was quoted as stating “You have to be ready to bunt in a World Series. I was not ready. I drove in 98 runs. I hit 25 home runs [including 15 at Candlestick Park], and Candlestick was big. I saw the bunt sign, and I had my doubts."

Despite playing with a handful of Latino players (such as Orlando Cepeda) on the Giants, manager Alvin Dark did not allow them to speak Spanish in the clubhouse, which displeased Alou, who noted it decades later in his memoirs; the two became friends after Alou retired because of their shared Christian faith. He also had a problem with what he felt was a lack of understanding that Major League Baseball had with its Latino players, stating “We have many friends in this country, our names are in the American papers, and we become well known to many Americans, but though we are in this country, we are not a part of this country. We are strangers.”

=== Milwaukee / Atlanta Braves (1964–1969) ===
Alou was traded to the Braves before the 1964 season with Ed Bailey, Billy Hoeft and a player to be named later (Ernie Bowman) for Del Crandall, Bob Hendley and Bob Shaw. In 1966 Alou batted .327 with 31 home runs and led the league in runs (122), hits (218), at bats (666) and total bases (355); he finished second in the batting race to his brother Matty and fifth in National League MVP voting. In 1968 Alou batted .317 and leading the league in hits (210) and at bats (662); he made the All-Star team both years. While the Braves went to the 1969 National League Championship Series after winning the NL West, Alou appeared just once, doing so as a pinch hitter in Game 3. Facing Nolan Ryan, he lined out in the eighth inning for his last postseason appearance as a player.

=== Oakland Athletics (1970–1971) ===
After the season, the Braves traded Alou to the Oakland Athletics for Jim Nash.

=== New York Yankees (1971–1973) ===
In April 1971, Alou was dealt from the Oakland Athletics to the New York Yankees for Rob Gardner and Ron Klimkowski on April 9, 1971.

He played in 131 games for the Yankees, batting .288 with 135 total hits and eight home runs. He played another two years with the Yankees (playing 120 games in 1972, 93 in 1973), ultimately hitting .271 with 289 combined hits in three years with the team.

=== Montreal Expos (1973) ===
On September 6, 1973, Alou was selected off waivers by the Montreal Expos from the Yankees; he played nineteen games with the Expos, having ten hits.

=== Milwaukee Brewers (1974) ===
Alou was purchased by the Milwaukee Brewers from the Expos after the season. He played three games for the Brewers, striking out twice with no hits before being released on April 29.

In 2,082 games played over eighteen seasons, Alou compiled a .286 batting average (2101-for-7339) with 985 runs, 359 doubles, 49 triples, 206 home runs, 852 RBI, 423 base on balls, .328 on-base percentage and .433 slugging percentage. His career fielding percentage was .986 at all three outfield positions and first base.

== Coaching and managerial career ==
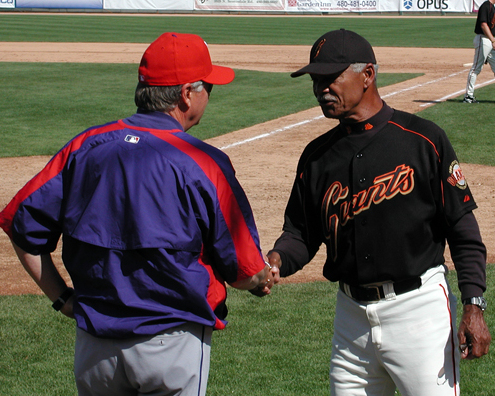
Alou (right) as manager of the Giants in 2005.

=== Montreal Expos (1979–1980, 1984, 1992–2001) ===
After the end of his playing career, Alou joined the Montreal Expos organization in 1976, becoming a batting coach and a minor league manager. The Giants offered him the manager's spot in 1985, but he remained with the Expos out of loyalty.

On May 22, 1992, he was promoted from bench coach to field manager of the Expos, becoming the first Dominican-born manager in MLB history.

The team was developing a core of young talent during this period, including Larry Walker, John Wetteland, Delino DeShields and Alou's own son, Moisés. In 1994 the Expos had the best record in the major leagues until the mid-August strike that ended up cancelling the entire postseason, thereby denying them a chance to get to their first World Series, and ownership soon began dealing all their young talent to cut payroll. Alou was named the NL Manager of the Year. The Los Angeles Dodgers tried to lure him away in 1998, but he declined to leave Montreal and eventually became the most successful manager in team history.

Despite Alou's popularity in Montreal, the Expos' lackluster record after 1994 eventually led to his dismissal by new owner Jeffrey Loria, who replaced him with Jeff Torborg during the 2001 season. Several teams tried to lure him out of retirement, including the Boston Red Sox, but he would not budge.

=== Detroit Tigers (2002) ===
Alou finally agreed to serve a single year as the bench coach for Detroit Tigers rookie manager Luis Pujols (2002).

=== San Francisco Giants (2003–2006) ===
Prior to the 2003 season, Alou was named manager of the Giants, the team where he began his professional baseball career, replacing Dusty Baker who had left to manage the Chicago Cubs. In his first season in San Francisco, he won a hundred games and managed the Giants into the playoffs, but they fell to the Florida Marlins in the NL Division Series in 4 games; the Marlins went on to win their second World Series in seven years.

In 2005, the Giants signed Moisés Alou to a one-year contract with an option for the 2006 season, reuniting him professionally with his father after seven seasons apart. On July 3, 2006, Alou won his 1,000th game as a manager, winning against the Colorado Rockies 9–6. He retired as Giants' manager after the 2006 season. Since 2007, he has remained with the Giants organization as a special assistant to the general manager.

Alou managed the Dominican Republic national team at the 2009 World Baseball Classic. He was hampered by the absence of several star players, such as Alex Rodriguez, Adrián Beltré, and Albert Pujols, who either withdrew or were not given permission to join the team. The Dominican Republic saw a disappointing 1–2 run and was eliminated from the tournament by the Netherlands.

== Managerial record ==
Team	Year	Regular season					Postseason			
Team	Year	Games	Won	Lost	Win %	Finish	Won	Lost	Win %	Result
MTL	1992	125	70	55	.560	2nd in NL East	–	–	–	–
MTL	1993	162	94	68	.580	2nd in NL East	–	–	–	–
MTL	1994	114	74	40	.649	1st in NL East	Postseason cancelled			
MTL	1995	144	66	78	.458	5th in NL East	–	–	–	–
MTL	1996	162	88	74	.543	2nd in NL East	–	–	–	–
MTL	1997	162	78	84	.481	4th in NL East	–	–	–	–
MTL	1998	162	65	97	.401	4th in NL East	–	–	–	–
MTL	1999	162	68	94	.420	4th in NL East	–	–	–	–
MTL	2000	162	67	95	.414	4th in NL East	–	–	–	–
MTL	2001	53	21	32	.396	(fired)	–	–	–	–
MTL total		1,409	691	717	.491		–	–	–	–
SF	2003	161	100	61	.621	1st in NL West	1	3	.250	Lost NLDS (FLA)
SF	2004	162	91	71	.562	2nd in NL West	–	–	–	–
SF	2005	162	75	87	.463	3rd in NL West	–	–	–	–
SF	2006	162	76	85	.472	3rd in NL West	–	–	–	–
SF total		646	342	304	.529		–	–	–	–
Total		2,055	1,033	1,021	.503		1	3	.250	

== Personal life ==
Alou has been married four times, three of which ended in divorce. He met Lucie in 1985 and they reside in Florida. He continues to work in baseball. Alou has eleven children: Maria Rojas Beltre, Felipe Rojas Beltre (who died in a swimming accident at the age of 15), José Rojas Beltre, Moisés Alou, Christia Alou, Cheri Alou, Jennifer Alou, Felipe Rojas Brens, Luis Rojas, Valérie Alou, and Felipe Alou Jr.

In 2018, he released a memoir, titled Alou: My Baseball Journey, which he cowrote with Peter Kerasotis.

After the death of his brothers, he is the oldest living player out of the Alou family.

== See also ==
- List of Major League Baseball annual runs scored leaders
- List of Major League Baseball career hits leaders
- List of Major League Baseball managerial wins and winning percentage leaders
- List of Major League Baseball players from the Dominican Republic
- List of second-generation Major League Baseball players

== Notes ==
Sporting positions
Preceded by Vern Rapp	Montreal Expos First Base Coach; 1984–1985	Succeeded by Ron Hansen
Preceded by Luis Pujols	Detroit Tigers Bench Coach; 2002	Succeeded by Kirk Gibson
