= Bernie Henderson =

American baseball player (1899–1966)

- Pitcher
- Born: April 12, 1899; Douglassville, Texas, U.S.
- Died: June 4, 1966 (aged 67); Linden, Texas, U.S.
- Batted: Right Threw: Right

MLB debut
- September 5, 1921, for the Cleveland Indians

Last MLB appearance
- October 2, 1921, for the Cleveland Indians

MLB statistics
- Win–loss record: 0–1
- Earned run average: 9.00
- Strikeouts: 1
- Stats at Baseball Reference

Teams
- Cleveland Indians (1921)

Bernard Henderson (April 12, 1899 – June 6, 1966), nicknamed "Barnyard", was an American Major League Baseball pitcher who played for one season. He pitched in two games for the Cleveland Indians during the 1921 Cleveland Indians season.
