= Rip Vowinkel =

American baseball player (1884–1966)

- Pitcher
- Born: November 18, 1884; Oswego, New York
- Died: July 13, 1966 (aged 81); Oswego, New York
- Batted: Right Threw: Right

MLB debut
- September 5, 1905, for the Cincinnati Reds

Last MLB appearance
- October 7, 1905, for the Cincinnati Reds

MLB statistics
- Win–loss record: 3–3
- Earned run average: 4.17
- Strikeouts: 7

Teams
- Cincinnati Reds (1905)

John Henry "Rip" Vowinkel (November 18, 1884 – July 13, 1966) was a Major League Baseball pitcher. Vowinkel played for the Cincinnati Reds in 1905. In six career games, he had a 3–3 record with a 4.17 ERA. He batted and threw left-handed.

Vowinkel was born and died in Oswego, New York.
