= Emanuel Sampson =

American baseball player

- Outfielder
- Born: September 17, 1910; Ocala, Florida, U.S.
- Died: December 10, 1966 (aged 56); Columbia County, Florida, U.S.

Negro league baseball debut
- 1940, for the Cleveland Bears

Last appearance
- 1946, for the Birmingham Black Barons

Teams
- Cleveland Bears (1940); Jacksonville Red Caps (1941); Birmingham Black Barons (1941, 1946)

Emanuel "Eddie" Sampson (September 17, 1910 - December 10, 1966) was an American Negro league baseball outfielder who played in the 1940s.

Sampson made his Negro leagues debut with the Cleveland Bears in 1940. He also played for the Jacksonville Red Caps in 1941 and the Birmingham Black Barons in 1941 and again in 1946.
