= Matty Alou =

Dominican baseball player and manager (1938–2011)

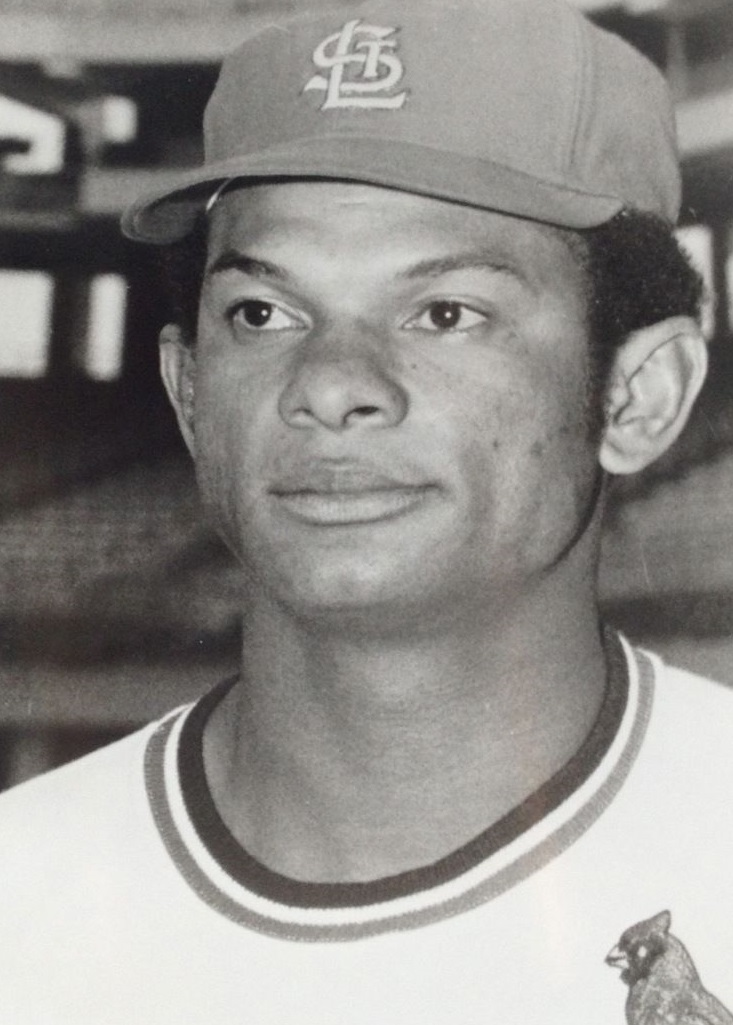
- Alou in 1971
- Outfielder
- Born: December 22, 1938; Haina, Dominican Republic
- Died: November 3, 2011 (aged 72); Santo Domingo, Dominican Republic
- Batted: Left Threw: Left

Professional debut
- MLB: September 26, 1960, for the San Francisco Giants
- NPB: July 26, 1974, for the Taiheiyo Club Lions

Last appearance
- MLB: June 21, 1974, for the San Diego Padres
- NPB: September 5, 1976, for the Taiheiyo Club Lions

MLB statistics
- Batting average: .307
- Home runs: 31
- Runs batted in: 427

NPB statistics
- Batting average: .283
- Home runs: 14
- Runs batted in: 75
- Stats at Baseball Reference

Teams
- San Francisco Giants (1960–1965); Pittsburgh Pirates (1966–1970); St. Louis Cardinals (1971–1972); Oakland Athletics (1972); New York Yankees (1973); St. Louis Cardinals (1973); San Diego Padres (1974); Taiheiyo Club Lions (1974–1976)

Career highlights and awards
- 2× All-Star (1968, 1969); World Series champion (1972); NL batting champion (1966)

Mateo "Matty" Rojas Alou (December 22, 1938 – November 3, 2011) was a Dominican professional baseball player and manager. He played as an outfielder in Major League Baseball from 1960 to 1974. He also played in Nippon Professional Baseball (NPB) with the Taiheiyo Club Lions from 1974 through 1976. Alou was a two-time All-Star and the 1966 National League batting champion.

== Baseball career ==
Alou was the middle of a trio of baseball-playing brothers that included the older Felipe and younger Jesús. They were the first set of three siblings to all bat in the same half-inning in the majors (September 10), and play together in the same outfield (on September 15), accomplishing both with the Giants in 1963. The latter achievement happened in the last two innings of a 13–5 win over the Pittsburgh Pirates at Forbes Field, with starting right fielder Felipe first moving to left in the seventh inning when Jesús entered the game in right and then to center in the eighth when Matty was inserted in left. Matty had been teammates with Felipe during the prior three campaigns, and was likewise with Jesús for the following two. Matty and Felipe later reunited with the Yankees in 1973.

Alou's best years as a player were spent with the Pirates, where he won the National League (NL) batting title in 1966 and was a two-time All-Star in 1968 and 1969. He was a member of a World Series Champion with the Athletics in 1972 and a NL pennant winner with the Giants in 1962.

== Playing career ==
Alou was born in Haina, Dominican Republic. He was a platoon player for the Giants for several years and was mostly unremarkable. His finest moment in San Francisco came in 1962 when his pinch-hit bunt single in the final game of a three-game tie-breaking playoff against the Los Angeles Dodgers began the rally that won the game and the pennant for the Giants. He batted .333 in the Giants' losing effort against the Yankees in the 1962 World Series. While he was primarily an outfielder, Alou also appeared in one game in 1965 as a pitcher, pitching two scoreless innings.

After being traded to the Pittsburgh Pirates before the 1966 season Alou received instruction from expert hitting instructor Harry "the Hat" Walker that helped turn him into a high-average contact hitter. This earned him a starting job as an integral member of a Pirates team which included future Baseball Hall of Fame members Roberto Clemente, Bill Mazeroski and Willie Stargell. The Pirates fought the Los Angeles Dodgers and San Francisco Giants in a tight pennant race and were in first place on September 10, before they faltered to finish the season in third place for a second consecutive year. Alou won the 1966 NL batting title with a .342 average, with his brother Felipe finishing second, and finished in the top five in hitting four more times - in 1967–1969, 1971.

His contract was sold by the St. Louis Cardinals to the San Diego Padres on October 24, 1973,

In 1969 Alou led the major leagues in at-bats (698), doubles (41), and hits (231). His 231 hits in 1969 remain the highest total by any National League player since Joe Medwick's 237 in 1937.

After leaving the Major Leagues following the 1974 season, he played three seasons in Japan (Taiheiyo Club Lions) and managed in the Dominican Professional Baseball League.

== Death and legacy ==
On June 23, 2007, the Hispanic Heritage Baseball Museum Hall of Fame inducted Alou into their Hall of Fame during an on-field, pre-game ceremony at AT&T Park before a game between the San Francisco Giants and the New York Yankees.

Alou died in Santo Domingo, Dominican Republic as the result of diabetic complications, according to his former Dominican team, Leones del Escogido. The Giants confirmed Alou had had variety of health issues for several years.

Alou was honored in New York City by the naming of Matty Alou Way in Upper Manhattan's Inwood Hill Park neighborhood in October 2015.

== See also ==
- Alou family
- List of Major League Baseball batting champions
- List of Major League Baseball annual doubles leaders
- List of Major League Baseball career stolen bases leaders
