= Bajos de Haina =

- Bajos de Haina in the Dominican Republic
- Coordinates: 18°25′12″N 70°01′48″W
- Country: Dominican Republic
- Province: San Cristóbal

Area
  - Total: 38.49 km^{2} (14.86 sq mi)

Population (2022)
  - Total: 188,767
  - Density: 4,904/km^{2} (12,700/sq mi)
  - Urban: 82,691
- Municipal Districts: 1

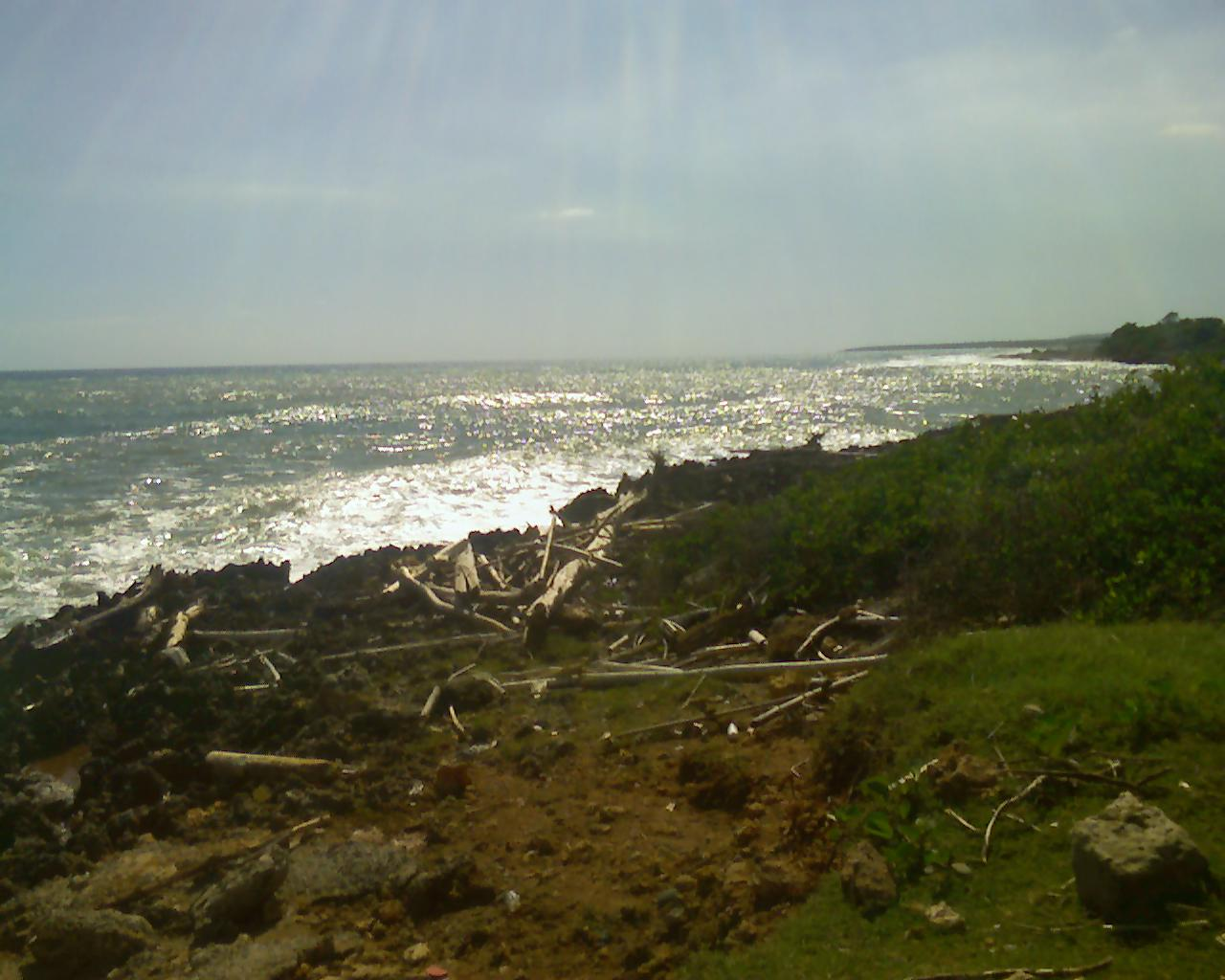
Haina shoreline

Bajos de Haina (Standard Spanish pronunciation: [ˈbaxos ðe ˈajna]), mostly known simply as Haina, is a town and municipality in the San Cristóbal Province, of the Dominican Republic. It is close to the capital Santo Domingo, and may be regarded as part of the metropolitan area of Greater Santo Domingo. The municipality had a population of 188,767 in 2024.

== History ==
According to some versions, Miguel Díaz, who had migrated from La Isabela, arrived in Haina after having injured a man who was intimately related to the Spanish authorities. Once he settled there, he married a native woman named Catalina who told him of a gold deposit in the western bank of the Haina River. After confirming the existence of the precious metal, he returned to La Isabela where he told Christopher Columbus and his brother Bartholomew of his discovery. The Admiral sent his brother to confirm the existence of the deposit, since he had to leave for Europe.

Bartholomew realized that there indeed was gold and decided to build a fort that he named San Cristóbal, which served as lodging for the soldiers that participated in this activity.

A very large gold nugget was found in 1502, at the western bank of the Haina River, eight kilometers from Villa Altagracia, in a place known as Madrigal. The nugget was sent to Spain, but the ship that carried it sank along with Governor Francisco de Bobadilla, cacique Guarionex and dozens of Spaniards.

Most recently the municipality of Haina is known for many years to be one of the fastest growing economies within the Dominican Republic. The refinery and the zona franca or duty-free zone are among the most important sources for employment in the whole province of San Cristobal.

== Pollution ==
Bajos de Haina has been referred to as the 'Dominican Chernobyl'. According to the United Nations, the population of Haina has been considered to have the highest level of lead contamination in the world, and its entire population carries indications of lead poisoning. The contamination is believed to have been caused by the past industrial operations of the nearby Baterías Meteoro, an automobile battery recycling smelter. Although the company has moved to a new site, the contamination still remains.

Bajos de Haina was named as one of the ten most polluted places on earth by the US based environmental group the Blacksmith Institute in 2006.

Between December 2008 and March 2009, Blacksmith conducted cleanup, coordinating the removal of over 6,000 cubic meters of contaminated soil from the site, which has been turned into a local park. Following the remediation and a number of community education campaigns, blood lead levels have significantly dropped and are now at acceptable levels. Haina is no longer on Blacksmith's list of world's worst polluted places.

Haina was one of the locations featured on Team Seas, a project led by American YouTubers MrBeast and Mark Rober. Both of them traveled to the beach and helped clean up the trash, as well as try and help find cleaner ways to dispose of the trash.
