= Roswell, New Mexico, minor league baseball history =

Roswell, New Mexico minor league baseball teams
- 1923–1959; (1923, 1937, 1949–1956, 1959, 2011–Present); Roswell, New Mexico

Minor league affiliations
- Class: Class D (1923, 1937, 1949–1950); Class C (1951–1955); Class B (1956); Class D (1959); Independent (2011–Present)
- League: Panhandle-Pecos Valley League (1923); West Texas–New Mexico League (1937); Longhorn League (1949–1955); Southwestern League (1956); Sophomore League (1959); Pecos League (2011–Present)

Major league affiliations
- Team: Pittsburgh Pirates (1959)

Minor league titles
- League titles (0): None

Team data
- Name: Roswell Giants (1923); Roswell Sunshiners (1937); Roswell Rockets(1949–1956); Roswell Pirates (1959); Roswell Invaders (2011–Present)
- Ballpark: League Park (1937); Fair Park Stadium (1949–1956, 1959)

Minor league baseball teams were based in Roswell, New Mexico, in various seasons between 1923 and 1959, before resuming play in 2011. Roswell teams played as members of the Panhandle-Pecos Valley League in 1923, West Texas–New Mexico League in 1937, Longhorn League from 1949 to 1955, Southwestern League in 1956, Sophomore League in 1959 and Pecos League from 2011 to present. The 1959 Roswell Pirates were a minor league affiliate of the Pittsburgh Pirates. Roswell hosted home games at League Park in 1937 and Fair Park Stadium.

Joe Bauman hit a minor league record 72 home runs playing for the 1954 Roswell Rockets. Baseball Hall of Fame inductee Willie Stargell played for the 1959 Roswell Pirates.

== History ==
Minor league baseball started in Roswell, New Mexico, in 1923. The Roswell Giants began play as charter members the four–team Panhandle-Pecos Valley League, which had evolved from the West Texas League. The Roswell Giants joined the Amarillo Gassers, Clovis Cubs and Lubbock Hubbers as franchises in the new league. On August 15, 1923, Roswell had a record of 41–63 and were in fourth place when the Panhandle-Pecos Valley League permanently folded.

In 1937, the Roswell Sunshiners were charter members of the six–team Class D West Texas-New Mexico League. Roswell joined the Hobbs Drillers, Midland Cardinals, Monahans Trojans, Odessa Oilers and Wink Spudders in the West Texas-New Mexico League.

The Roswell Sunshiners finished with a record of 55–62, placing second in the 1937 West Texas-New Mexico League, as the Odessa and Midland franchises withdrew during the season. In the playoffs, Roswell defeated the Monahans Trojans 3 games to 2. In the Finals, the Wink Spudders swept Roswell in three games. The Roswell Franchise did not return to the league in 1938.

The 1949 Roswell Rockets joined the eight–team Longhorn League, playing with fellow members Ballinger Cats, Big Spring Broncs, Midland Indians, Odessa Oilers, San Angelo Colts, Sweetwater Swatters, and Vernon Dusters.

The Roswell Rockets finished last in their first Longhorn League season, placing eighth with a 57–82 record. The Rockets drew 43,584 fans for the season.

In 1950, the Roswell Rockets finished 89–62, placing second in the Longhorn League regular season standings. In the playoffs, the Big Spring Broncs swept Roswell in four games. The Rockets had home a season attendance total of 82,671, an average of 1,095.

Roswell advanced to the Longhorn League finals in 1951, as the Longhorn League became a Class C level league. The Rockets finished with a 79–61 record to place third in the 1951 regular season. In the playoffs, Roswell defeated the Big Spring Broncs 4 games to 2. In the finals the Odessa Oilers defeated Roswell 4 games to 2. They drew 65,361.

In 1952, Roswell finished 65–75 (6th), followed by 60–70 (5th) in 1953. They missed the playoffs in both seasons.

The 1954 Roswell Rockets finished 87–51, placing second in the regular season. In the playoffs, the Carlsbad Potashers defeated Roswell 4 games to 2. They drew 53,280 for the season. Rockets player Joe Bauman hit 72 home runs for Roswell in 1954, setting a single season minor-league home run record. Bauman also hit .400 with 150 walks, 188 runs and 224 RBI in 1954.

Bauman had been acquired from the Artesia Drillers after the 1953 season. Bauman owned and operated a filling station in Roswell in 1954 and resided there the rest of his life. Besides hitting 72 home runs in 1954, Bauman hit four in one game at home on August 31, 1954, in a 15–4 win over the Sweetwater Spudders. The four home runs gave him 68 on the season and came one night after Bauman hit a home run on "Joe Bauman Night" on August 30. Bauman hit 13 home runs in the last 14 games of the 1954 season to reach 72. As was common in the Longhorn League, fans would push money through the backstop fence to players after home runs. Bauman often made several hundred dollars through the practice.

In 1955, the Rockets were 79–56, placing 2second in the Longhorn League. In the playoffs, they defeated the Artesia Numexers 4 games to 3 to advance. In the Finals, the San Angelo Colts swept the Rockets in 4 games. Joe Bauman followed his record setting season by hitting .336 with 46 home runs and 132 RBI. The Rockets' 1955 attendance was 39,911.

The Roswell Rockets played in a newly named league in 1956. They finished 53–90 in 1956, placing ninth in the ten–team Southwestern League, as the Longhorn League expanded and was renamed. Roswell drew 18,367, an average of 257 per home game. The franchise folded after the 1956 season.

Roswell briefly regained a team on June 9, 1959, when the San Angelo Pirates of the Sophomore League moved to Roswell. The Roswell Pirates finished the season in Roswell. The San Angelo/Roswell Pirates finished with an overall record of 48–77. The franchise folded after the season. Baseball Hall of Fame member Willie Stargell played for the Roswell Pirates in 1959 and hit .274 with 7 home runs and 87 RBI. Joe Bauman managed the 1959 Roswell Pirates for part of the season.

Roswell was without minor league baseball until the 2011 Roswell Invaders began play as members of the independent level Pecos League. The Invaders continue play today.

== The ballparks ==
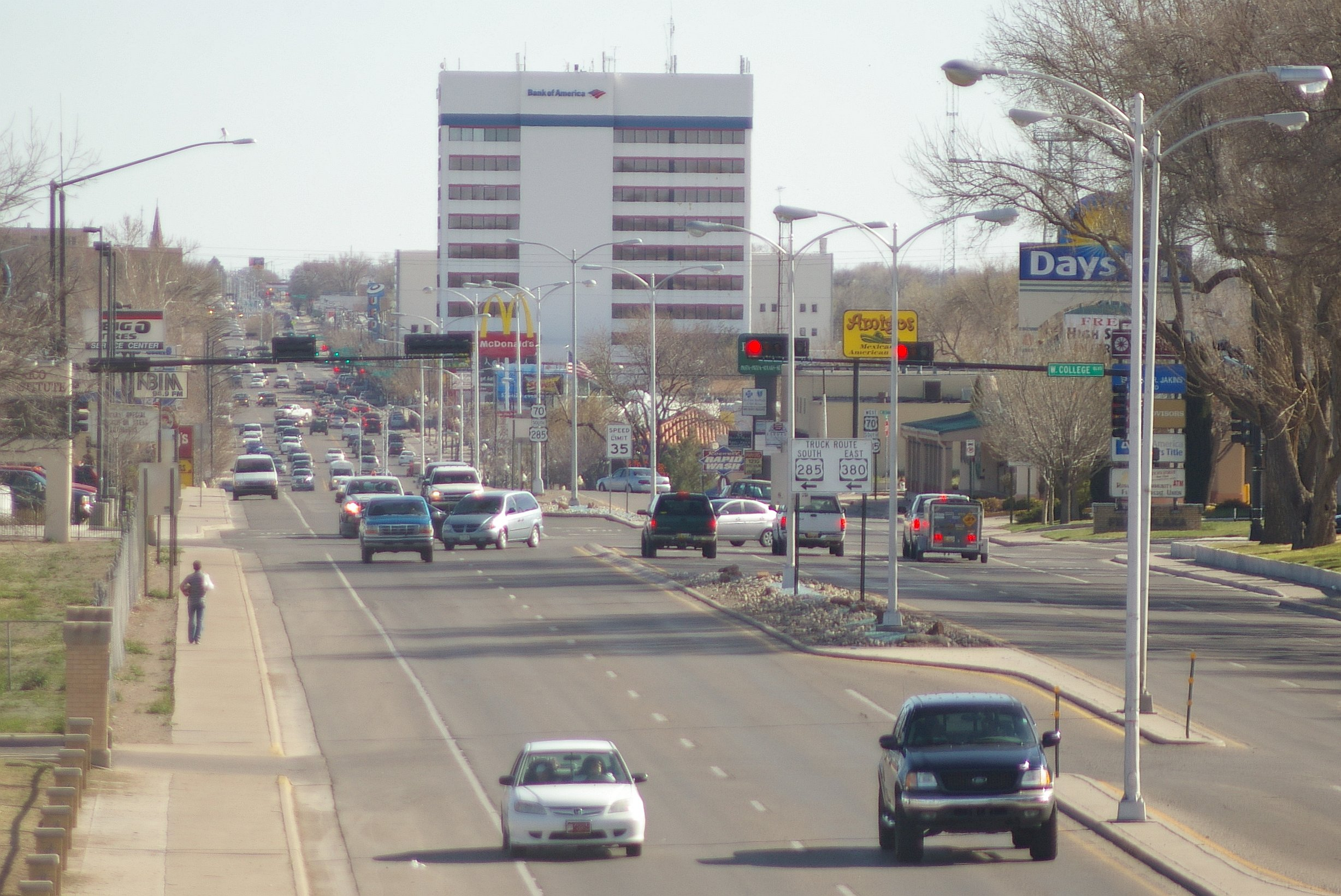
(2010) Main Street. Roswell, New Mexico.

In 1937, the Roswell Sunshiners played home minor league games at League Park. The ballpark had a capacity of 1,200 and dimensions (left, center, right) of 330–500–425.

Beginning in 1949, the Roswell minor league teams were reported to have played home games at Fair Park Stadium. The ballpark was also called "Rocket Park" at times.

The Fair Park Stadium is still in use today under a new name. The ballpark is now called "Joe Bauman Baseball Stadium" and hosts the Roswell Invaders. The ballpark location is 900 Block East Poe in Roswell, New Mexico.

== Notable alumni ==
- Ossie Alvarez (1953-1954)
- Joe Bauman (1954–1955), (1959, MGR), 72 HR - minor league record
- Ron Brand (1959)
- Tom Brookshier (1954)
- Vallie Eaves (1954)
- Evelio Hernandez (1954)
- Stubby Greer (1952, 1954)
- Tom Jordan (1949), (1950, 1956, MGR)
- Lew McCarty (1923)
- Wally Millies (1959, MGR)
- Alex Monchak (1951–1952, MGR)
- Baby Ortiz (1953–1954)
- Bob Priddy (1959)
- Vic Roznovsky (1959)
- Lefty Scott (1937)
- Willie Stargell (1959), inducted into the Baseball Hall of Fame
- Sam West (1923), 4x MLB All-Star

== See also ==
- Roswell Rockets players
- Roswell Pirates players
- Roswell Giants players
