= Ballinger Westerners =

- 1956–1957; Ballinger, Texas

Minor league affiliations
- Class: Class B (1956–1957)
- League: Southwestern League (1956–1957)

Major league affiliations
- Team: None

Minor league titles
- League titles (0): None
- Wild card berths (0): None

Team data
- Name: Ballinger Westerners (1956–1957)
- Ballpark: Cat Park (1956–1957)

The Ballinger Westerners were a minor league baseball team based in Ballinger, Texas. In the 1956 and 1957 seasons, the Westerners played as members of the Class B level Southwestern League in both seasons. The Westerners were the final minor league team hosted in Ballinger, hosting home games at Cat Park.

== History ==
The Westerners were preceded in Ballinger by the 1953 Winters-Ballinger Eagles of the Class D level Longhorn League.

The Ballinger "Westerners" became members of Class B level Southwestern League in 1956. The Westerners played two seasons in the league and the Ballinger franchise folded when the league evolved to become the Class D level Sophomore League in 1958.

In 1956, the Class C level Longhorn League reorganized to become the Southwestern League, while expanding to ten teams. The Ballinger Westerners were a new franchise added to the reformed league. The Westerners joined the Carlsbad Potashers, Clovis Pioneers, El Paso Texans, Hobbs Sports, Midland Indians, Pampa Oilers, Plainview Ponies, Roswell Rockets and San Angelo Colts franchises in league play.

The 1956 Westerners placed sixth in the Southwestern League standings. With a record of 73–69, playing the season under manager Tony York, Ballinger finished 17.0 games behind the first place Hobbs Sports in the regular season standings. Ballinger did not qualify for the four–team playoffs, won by the El Paso Texans. The 1956 Westerners scored 881 total runs and allowed 927 runs. Vince Magi hit 30 home runs for Ballinger, while teammate James Moore drove in 122 runs. Kenny Jones led the team with a .338 average. Edmond McKay and Ralph Mason each had 18 wins, and Eugene Lippold added 17 wins and lead the team with a 3.92 earned run average.

In their final season, the Ballinger Westerners placed second in the 1957 Southwestern League. The league began the season as an eight–team league, with four teams disbanding during the season. Ballinger finished 1957 with a record of 69–56, playing under returning manager Tony York. The Westerners ended the season 4.0 games behind the first place Hobbs Sports, as the Southwestern League did not hold playoffs in 1957. The Westerners scored 741 total runs, while allowing 721 runs. Walter O'Neil led the team with 22 home runs, while Kenny Jones drove in 88 to lead the team. Robert Leach and Eugene Lippold both had 19 wins to lead the league. Lippold also led the league with 179 strikeouts.

Following the 1957 season, the Southwestern League reorganized and became the Class D level Sophomore League. The Ballinger franchise was not included in the newly formed league. Ballinger, Texas hasn't hosted another minor league team.

== The ballpark ==
The Ballinger Westerners played 1956 and 1957 minor league home games at Cat Park. The ballpark was located at the Runnels County Fairgrounds, located at South 8th Street & Ball Avenue in Ballinger.

== Timeline ==
Year(s)	# Yrs.	Team	Level	League	Ballpark
1956–1957	2	Ballinger Westerners	Class B	Southwestern League	Cat Park

== Year–by–year records ==
Year	Record	Finish	Manager	Attend	Playoffs/Notes
1956	73–69	6th	Tony York	24,614	Did not qualify
1957	69–56	2nd	Tony York	16,542	No playoffs held

== Notable alumni ==
- Stubby Greer (1957)
- Tony York (1956–1957, MGR)

=== See also ===
Ballinger Westerners players
