= Longhorn League =

American Minor League Baseball league (1947–1955)

- Most recent season or competition: 1955 Longhorn League season
- Classification: Class D (1947–1950); Class C (1951–1955)
- Sport: Minor League Baseball
- First season: 1947
- Folded: 1955
- Replaced by: Southwestern League
- President: Howard Green (1947–1948); Hal Sayles (1949–1953); Harry A. James (1954); J.C. Cunningham (1955)
- No. of teams: 15
- Country: United States
- Most titles: 2 Odessa Oilers; Midland Indians
- Related competitions: Rio Grande Valley League

The Longhorn League was the name of a Minor league baseball circuit that operated from 1947 through 1955 in the Southwestern United States. In 1956, it was renamed the Southwestern League and operated through 1957 before changing its name to the Sophomore League. Joe Bauman hit 72 home runs in 1954 to set the minor league record, while playing for the Roswell Rockets.

== History ==
The Longhorn League was a high–offense league that operated from 1947 through 1955. In 1956, it was renamed the Southwestern League. A league with only three teams ever affiliated with major league clubs, all for one year only, the league was home to veteran minor leaguers who were no longer of interest to major league teams. In two of the league's nine seasons, a Longhorn League player posted the top average in the minors – Jim Prince in 1947 and Tom Jordan in 1955. A .400 average or .700 slugging in this league was not uncommon. The league is notable for Joe Bauman setting the all–time minor-league home run record in 1954 with 72 home runs.

== Cities represented ==
- Artesia, New Mexico: Artesia Drillers 1951–1953; Artesia Numexers 1954–1955
- Ballinger, Texas: Ballinger Cats 1947–1950
- Big Spring, Texas: Big Spring Broncs 1947–1950; Big Spring Cosden Cops 1955
- Carlsbad, New Mexico: Carlsbad Potashers 1953–1957
- Del Rio, Texas: Del Rio Cowboys 1948
- Hobbs, New Mexico: Hobbs Sports 1955
- Lamesa, Texas: Lamesa Lobos 1953
- Midland, Texas: Midland Indians 1947, 1949–1950, 1954–1955
- Odessa, Texas: Odessa Oilers 1947–1954; Odessa Eagles1955
- Roswell, New Mexico: Roswell Rockets 1949–1955
- San Angelo, Texas: San Angelo Colts 1948–1955
- Sweetwater, Texas: Sweetwater Sports 1947–1948; Sweetwater Swatters 1949–1951; Sweetwater Braves 1952; Sweetwater Spudders 1954
- Vernon, Texas: Vernon Dusters 1947–1952
- Wichita Falls, Texas: Wichita Falls Spudders 1954
- Winters, Texas and Ballinger, Texas: Winters-Ballinger Eagles 1953

== Championship teams ==
- 1947 – Ballinger Cats
- 1948 – Midland Indians
- 1949 – Big Spring Broncs
- 1950 – Odessa Oilers
- 1951 – Odessa Oilers
- 1952 – Midland Indians
- 1953 – Carlsbad Potashers
- 1954 – Artesia NuMexers
- 1955 – San Angelo Colts

== Standings and statistics ==
1947 Longhorn League schedule

Team name	W	L	PCT	GB	Attend	Managers
Big Spring Broncs	81	48	.628	–	43,153	Pat Stasey
Midland Indians	75	55	.577	6.5	34,013	Harold Webb
Ballinger Cats	68	62	.523	13.5	42,662	Stuart Williams
Sweetwater Sports	63	67	.485	18.5	31,631	Rowland Murphy
Odessa Oilers	60	70	.462	21.5	38,415	Howie McFarland
Vernon Dusters	42	87	.326	39.0	30,758	Carl Kott

Playoffs: Big Springs 4 games, Sweetwater 3; Ballinger 4 games, Midland 3.
Finals: Ballinger 4 games, Big Springs 2.

Player statistics
Player	Team	Stat	Tot	Player	Team	Stat	Tot
James Prince	Midland	BA	.429	Jose Cendan	Big Spring	W	24
Orlando Moreno	Big Spring	Runs	186	Nippy Jones	Ballinger	SO	249
Pat Stasey; Bob Cowsar	Big Spring; Sweetwater	Hits	209	Ernie Nelson	Midland	ERA	3.87
Bob Cowsar	Sweetwater	RBI	176	Jose Cendan	Big Spring	PCT	.828 24–5
Bob Cowsar	Sweetwater	HR	37				

1948 Longhorn League schedule

Team name	W	L	PCT	GB	Attend	Managers
Big Spring Broncs	84	53	.613	–	59,503	Pat Stasey
Odessa Oilers	81	58	.583	4.0	61,193	Bill Davis / Merle Coleman
Midland Indians	79	60	.568	6.0	51,865	Harold Webb
Vernon Dusters	76	64	.543	9.5	50,250	Lloyd Rigby
Ballinger Cats	68	71	.489	17.0	34,413	Bill Atwood
Sweetwater Sports	64	76	.457	21.5	35,425	Clarence Gann
San Angelo Colts	63	77	.450	22.5	29,145	Robert Martin / Alvin Leedy
Del Rio Cowboys	42	98	.300	43.5	13,425	John Zanet / Bill Lacy / Sam Harshany

Playoffs: Veron 4 games, Big Spring 2; Midland 4 games, Odessa 0.
Finals: Midland 4 games, Vernon 3.

Player statistics
Player	Team	Stat	Tot	Player	Team	Stat	Tot
Pat Stasey	Big Spring	BA	.389	Edward Jacome	Vernon	W	22
Wilfred Rheingans	Odessa	Runs	134	William Gann	Sweetwater	SO	207
Roberto Fernandez	Big Spring	Hits	203	Jerry Fahr	Vernon	ERA	1.96
Kenneth Peacock	Sweetwater	RBI	162	Eusebio Perez	Big Spring	PCT	.833 15–3
Kenneth Peacock	Sweetwater	HR	34				

1949 Longhorn League schedule

Team name	W	L	PCT	GB	Attend	Managers
Big Spring Broncs	94	45	.676	–	58,559	Pat Stasey
Midland Indians	74	66	.529	20.5	52,078	Harold Webb
Vernon Dusters	72	66	.522	21.5	50,386	Robert Huntley
San Angelo Colts	69	68	.504	24.0	83,245	Sam Harshany
Odessa Oilers	66	74	.471	28.5	60,426	Alex Monchak
Ballinger Cats	64	76	.457	30.5	44,815	Charlie English / Stuart Williams / Lindsay Brown
Sweetwater Swatters	60	79	.432	34.0	33,770	Dick Gyselman / Kermit Lewis
Roswell Rockets	57	82	.410	37.0	43,584	Bob Crues / Potsy Allen

Playoffs: Big Spring 4 games, San Angelo 0; Midland 4 games, Vernon 1; Finals: Big Spring 4 games, Midland 0.

Player statistics
Player	Team	Stat	Tot	Player	Team	Stat	Tot
Pat Stasey	Big Spring	BA	.376	Julio Ramos	Big Spring	W	22
Alex Monchak	Odessa	Runs	147	Julio Ramos	Big Spring	SO	262
Carlos Pascual; Harry Scherting	Big Spring; Vernon	Hits	188	Humberto Garcia	Big Spring	ERA	1.77
Frank Mormino	Odessa	RBI	140	Julio Ramos	Big Spring	PCT	.846 22–4
Alex Monchak	Odessa	HR	35				

1950 Longhorn League schedule

Team name	W	L	PCT	GB	Attend	Managers
Odessa Oilers	97	55	.638	–	73,226	Alex Monchak
Roswell Rockets	89	62	.589	7.5	82,671	Tom Jordan
Big Spring Broncs	84	68	.553	13.0	49,302	Pat Stasey
Vernon Dusters	83	70	.542	14.5	46,099	Joe Berry
San Angelo Colts	82	71	.536	15.5	97,936	James McClure
Sweetwater Swatters	68	84	.447	29.0	39,773	John Bottarini / Dom Chiola
Midland Indians	66	87	.431	31.5	47,042	Harold Webb / Ralph Blair
Ballinger Cats	39	111	.260	57.0	27,902	Dutch Funderburk / Larry Gilchrist

Playoffs: Odessa 4 games, Vernon 1; Big Spring 4 games, Roswell 0.
Finals: Odessa 4 games, Big Spring 3.

Player statistics
Player	Team	Stat	Tot	Player	Team	Stat	Tot
Tom Jordan	Roswell	BA	.391	Billy Russell	Vernon	W	25
Leo Eastham	Odessa	Runs	166	Ray Hill	Roswell	SO	195
Tom Jordan	Roswell	Hits	216	James McClure	San Angelo	ERA	2.54
Tom Jordan	Roswell	RBI	180	Ray Drake	Roswell	PCT	.846 11–2
Tom Jordan	Roswell	HR	44				

1951 Longhorn League schedule

Team name	W	L	PCT	GB	Attend	Managers
San Angelo Colts	93	47	.664	–	115,118	Dutch Funderburk
Big Spring Broncs	82	57	.590	10.5	43,370	Pat Stasey
Roswell Rockets	79	61	.564	14.0	65,361	Alex Monchak
Odessa Oilers	76	63	.547	16.5	58,825	Jackie Sullivan / Robert Martin
Midland Indians	69	70	.497	23.5	52,797	Harold Webb / Zeke Bonura
Vernon Dusters	67	71	.486	25.0	36,686	Joe Berry / Homer Matney
Sweetwater Swatters	46	93	.331	46.5	32,430	Earl Harriman / Warren Sliter / Joe Bratcher / Julian Morgan / Julian Pressley
Artesia Drillers	45	95	.321	48.0	34,545	Hayden Greer

Playoffs: Odessa 4 games, San Angelo 1; Roswell 4 games, Big Spring 2.
Finals: Odessa 4 games, Roswell 2.

Player statistics
Player	Team	Stat	Tot	Player	Team	Stat	Tot
Pat Stasey	Big Spring	BA	.387	Dean Franks	Roswell	W	30
Leo Eastham	Odessa	Runs	157	Marshall Epperson	Vernon	SO	167
John Tayoan	San Angelo	Hits	209	Mike Fornieles	Big Spring	ERA	2.85
Wilbur Cearley	Roswell	RBI	141	Ray Sims	Odessa	PCT	.917 11–1
Wayne Wallace	San Angelo	HR	36				

1952 Longhorn League schedule

Team name	W	L	PCT	GB	Attend	Managers
Odessa Oilers	87	53	.621	–	72,665	Robert Martin
Big Spring Broncs	86	54	.614	1.0	49,652	Pat Stasey
Midland Indians	85	55	.607	2.0	64,188	Zeke Bonura / Jay Haney
Artesia Drillers	75	65	.536	12.0	42,972	Earl Perry
Roswell Rockets	65	75	.464	22.0	52,583	Alex Monchak
San Angelo Colts	65	75	.464	22.0	76,892	Mark Christman
Sweetwater Braves	52	88	.371	35.0	37,060	Alex Carrasquel / John Morris
Vernon Dusters	45	95	.321	42.0	30,105	Chester Fowler / Albert Richardson / Pat McLaughlin

Playoffs: Odessa 4 games, Artesia 1; Midland 4 games, Big Spring 0; Finals: Midland 4 games, Odessa 2.

Player statistics
Player	Team	Stat	Tot	Player	Team	Stat	Tot
Charles Buck	Sweetwater	BA	.382	Gilberto Guerra	Big Spring	W	26
Leo Eastham	Odessa	Runs	157	Gilberto Guerra	Big Spring	SO	225
Charles Buck	Sweetwater	Hits	210	Israel Ten	Midland	ERA	2.51
Joe Bauman	Artesia	RBI	157	Keith Nicholls	Midland	PCT	.750 24–8
Joe Bauman	Artesia	HR	50				

1953 Longhorn League schedule

Team name	W	L	PCT	GB	Attend	Managers
Carlsbad Potashers	80	52	.606	–	83,462	Pat McLaughlin
San Angelo Colts	77	52	.597	1.5	68,146	Rudy Briner
Midland Indians	73	58	.557	6.5	52,035	Jay Haney
Artesia Drillers	72	62	.537	9.0	40,042	Earl Perry / Joe Bauman
Roswell Rockets	60	70	.462	19.0	35,459	Pat Stasey
Odessa Oilers	53	78	.405	26.5	41,931	Robert Martin
Big Spring Broncs	35	57	.380	NA	24,089	Hack Miller / Joe Niedson
Lamesa Lobos / Winters-Ballinger Eagles	10	31	.244	NA	8,314	Harold Webb

Lamesa/Winters–Ballinger disbanded June 7; Big Spring disbanded July 31.
Playoffs: Carlsbad 4 games, Artesia 3; Midland 4 games, San Angelo 3; Finals: Carlsbad 4 games, Midland 2.

Player statistics
Player	Team	Stat	Tot	Player	Team	Stat	Tot
Ike Jackson	Carlsbad	BA	.388	Audie Malone	Carlsbad	W	25
Joe Bauman	Artesia	Runs	135	Marshall Epperson	Carlsbad	SO	214
Ike Jackson	Carlsbad	Hits	190	Mario Saldana	San Angelo	ERA	3.46
Joe Bauman	Artesia	TB	376	Audie Malone	Carlsbad	PCT	.806 25–6
Joe Bauman	Artesia	HR	53				

1954 Longhorn League schedule

Team name	W	L	PCT	GB	Attend	Managers
Artesia Numexers	92	46	.667	–	54,450	John Gibson / Jimmy Adair
Roswell Rockets	87	51	.630	5.0	53,280	Pat Stasey
Carlsbad Potashers	87	52	.626	5.5	60,963	Pat McLaughlin
Midland Indians	80	59	.576	12.5	43,109	Rudy Briner
Big Spring Broncs	70	65	.519	20.5	42,078	Robert Martin
Odessa Oilers	54	82	.397	37.0	26,281	Jack Knight / Wayne Batson
San Angelo Colts	53	86	.381	39.5	72,727	Hillis Layne
Wichita Falls Spudders / Sweetwater Spudders	27	109	.199	64.0	20,101	Red McCarty

Wichita Falls moved to Sweetwater May 6. Playoffs: Artesia 4 games, Midland 2; Carlsbad 4 games, Roswell 2; Finals: Artesia 4 games, Carlsbad 2.

Player statistics
Player	Team	Stat	Tot	Player	Team	Stat	Tot
Joe Bauman	Roswell	BA	.400	Robert Weaver	Carlsbad	W	21
Joe Bauman	Roswell	Runs	188	Julio Ramos	Sweet/Mid	SO	222
Ike Jackson	Carlsbad	Hits	215	Bartolo DiMaggio	Artesia	ERA	3.60
Joe Bauman	Roswell	RBI	224	Wayne Goodell	Artesia	PCT	.720 18–7
Joe Bauman	Roswell	HR	72				
Joe Bauman	Roswell	TB	456				

1955 Longhorn League schedule

Team name	W	L	PCT	GB	Attend	Managers
San Angelo Colts	85	55	.607	–	62,446	Pat McLaughlin
Roswell Rockets	79	56	.585	3.5	39,911	Hayden Greer
Artesia Numexers	80	57	.584	3.5	28,880	Tom Jordan
Carlsbad Potashers	72	67	.518	12.5	46,152	Thurman Tucker
Midland Indians	67	72	.482	17.5	62,602	Bill Capps
Hobbs Sports	62	77	.446	22.5	46,101	Pat Stasey
Big Spring Cosden Cops	57	83	.407	28.0	27,918	Robert Martin
Odessa Eagles	51	86	.372	32.5	34,574	Tony York

Playoffs: San Angelo 4 games, Carlsbad 1; Roswell 4 games, Artesia 3.
Finals: San Angelo 4 games, Roswell 0.

Player statistics
Player	Team	Stat	Tot	Player	Team	Stat	Tot
Tom Jordan	Artesia	BA	.407	Evelio Hernandez	Hobbs	W	23
Elias Osorio	San Angelo	Runs	142	Evelio Hernandez	Hobbs	SO	227
Tom Jordan	Artesia	Hits	221	Red Swanson	Midland	ERA	3.04
Tom Jordan	Artesia	RBI	159	Ed Locke	Artesia	PCT	.741 20–7
Joe Bauman	Roswell	HR	46				
Tom Jordan	Artesia	2B	69				

== League records 1947–1955 ==
Batting
Player	Team	Stat	Tot	Yr	Player	Team	Stat	Tot	Yr
[ William Peeler	Vernon	GA	153	50	Jim Prince	Midland	BA	.429	47
Felix Gomez	Big Spring	AB	642	50	Joe Bauman	Roswell	Runs	188	54
Tom Jordan	Artesia	Hits	221	55	Joe Bauman	Roswell	RBI	224	54
Tom Jordan	Artesia	2B	69	55	Roman Loyko	Odessa	3B	24	52
Joe Bauman	Roswell	HR	72	54	Joe Bauman	Roswell	EBH	110	54
Joe Bauman	Roswell	TB	456	54	Orlando Moreno	Big Spring	HS	43	47
Tony Guerrero	Odes/San Ang	Sac	22	50	Duane White	Roswell	SB	53	55
Leo Eastham	Odessa	BB	170	50	Joe Calderon	Artesia	SO	142	53

Player	Team	Stat	Tot	Yr	Player	Team	Stat	Tot	Yr
Dean Franks	Roswell	W	30	51	Dean Franks	Roswell	CG	30	51
Lee Zamora	Sweetwater	BB	192	50	Julio Ramos	Big Spring	Pct	.846, 22–4	49
Lloyd Wallis	Vernon	L	22	52	Roy Sims	Odessa	Pct	.917, 11–1	51
Humberto Garcia	Big Spring	ERA	1.77	49	Eddie Jacome	Midland	IP	338	51
Billy Russell	Vernon	Sho	7	50	Julio Ramos	Big Spring	SO	262	49

== Sources ==
- Encyclopedia of Minor League Baseball – Lloyd Johnson, Miles Wolff. Publisher: Baseball America, 1993. Language: English. Format: Paperback, 420pp. ISBN 0-9637189-1-6
