= Sweetwater Sports =

- 1947–1948; Sweetwater, Texas

Minor league affiliations
- Class: Class D (1947–1948)
- League: Longhorn League (1947–1948)

Major league affiliations
- Team: None

Minor league titles
- League titles (0): None
- Wild card berths (1): 1947

Team data
- Name: Sweetwater Sports (1947–1948)
- Ballpark: City Park (1947–1948)

The Sweetwater Sports were a minor league baseball team based in Sweetwater, Texas. In 1947 and 1948, the "Sports" played exclusively as members of the Class D level Longhorn League, qualifying for the 1947 playoffs. The Sports evolved to become the Sweetwater Swatters in 1949, continuing the franchise's tenure of play as members of the Longhorn League.

The Sweetwater Sports teams hosted minor league home games at City Park, known today as Newman Park.

== History ==
The Sports were preceded in minor league play by the 1922 Sweetwater Swatters, who ended a tenue of playing as members of the Class D level West Texas League.

Minor league baseball resumed in Sweetwater in 1947, when the Sweetwater "Sports" became charter members of the six-team Class D level Longhorn League. The Ballinger Cats, Big Spring Broncs, Midland Indians, Odessa Oilers and Vernon Dusters joined Sweetwater in beginning Longhorn League play on April 23, 1947.

In their first season of play, the Sports qualified for the Longhorn League playoffs. With a 63–67 record, Sweetwater placed fourth in the Longhorn League regular season, reaching the four-team playoffs. The Big Spring Broncs defeated Sweetwater in seven games in their first round series. Managed by Ronald Murphy, the Sports finished 18½ games behind first place Big Spring in the regular season standings. Sports' player Bob Cowsar led the Longhorn with 37 home runs and 176 RBI, while also topping the league with 209 total hits.

In 1948, the San Angelo Colts and Del Rio Cowboys franchises joined the Longhorn League, as the league expanded from six teams to eight teams. The Sweetwater Sports placed sixth in the eight–team league with a 64–76 record, playing under player/manager Clarence Gann and did not qualify for the four-team playoffs. The Sports finished 22½ games behind the first place Big Spring Broncs in the regular season standings, as the Midland Indians were the eventual league champion. Sweetwater's Kenneth Peacock led the Longhorn League with 34 home runs and 162 RBI. Pitcher Clarence Gann had 207 strikeouts to lead the league.

In 1949, the franchise renamed, as the Sweetwater Swatters and the franchise continued play as members the Longhorn League.

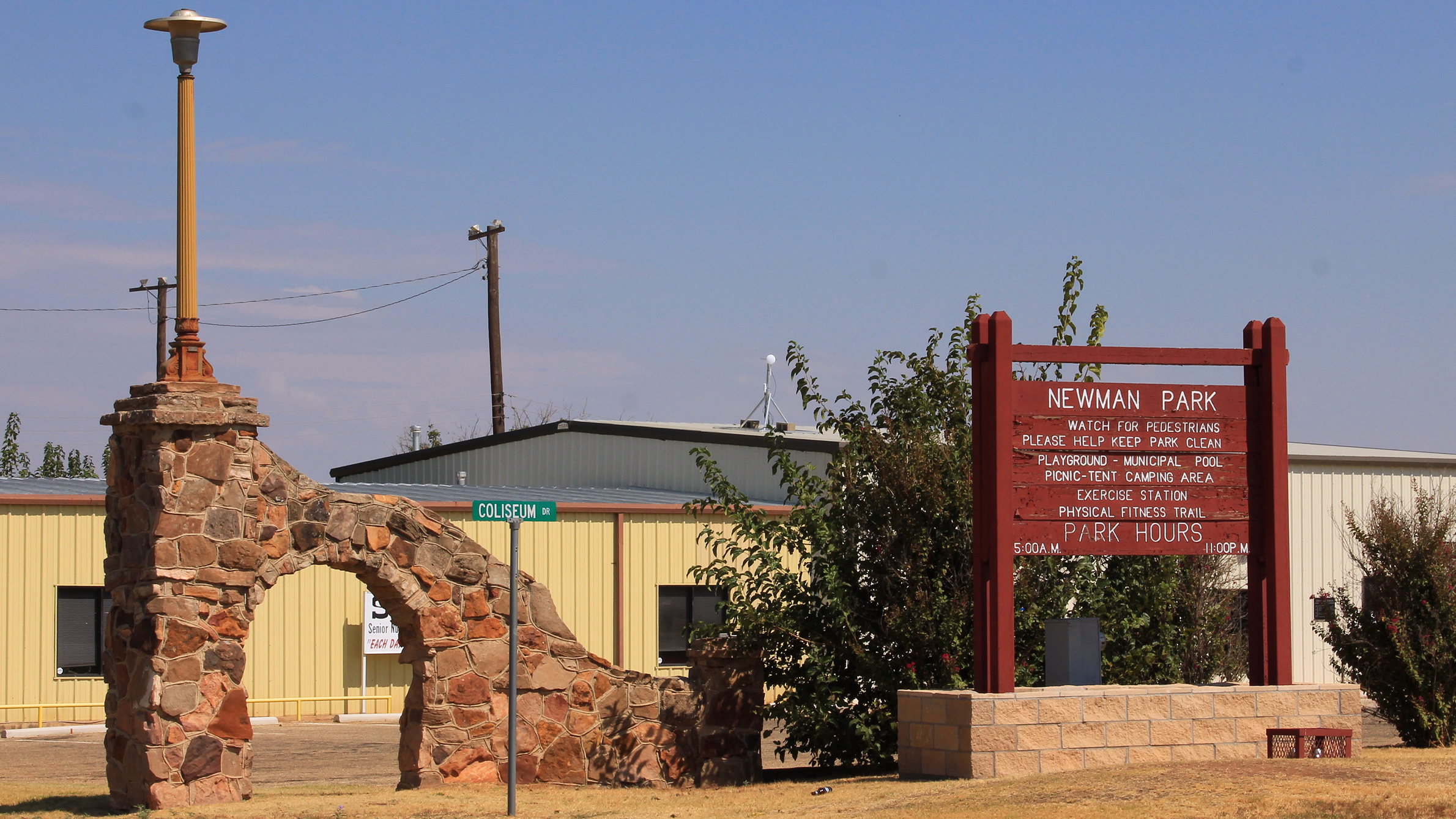
(2015) Newman Park Entrance. Sweetwater, Texas

== The ballpark ==
The Sweetwater Sports hosted minor league home games at City Park. The ballpark was also called "Sportsman's Park". Today, the site is called Newman Park. Newman Park still hosts baseball, along with other amenities and the park is located at 1000 Jack Hazard Drive.

== Timeline ==
Year(s)	# Yrs.	Team	Level	League	Ballpark
1947–1948	2	Sweetwater Sports	Class D	Longhorn League	City Park

== Year–by–year records ==
Year	Record	Finish	Manager	Playoffs/Notes
1947	63–67	4th	Ronald Murphy	Did not qualify
1948	64–76	6th	Clarence Gann	Did not qualify

== Notable alumni ==
- No Sweetwater Sports players advanced to the major leagues.
