= Stubby Greer =

Player, coach and manager in American minor league baseball

William Greer
- Minor league manager
- Born: 1920; Carbon, Texas, U.S.
- Died: September 14, 1994 (aged 73–74)
- Batted: Right Threw: Unknown
- Stats at Baseball Reference

William Hayden "Stubby" Greer (1920 in Carbon, Texas – September 14, 1994) was an American player, coach and manager in Minor League Baseball.

Greer debuted in 1940 with the Midland Cowboys and hit .305/?/.464 with 80 runs in 94 games. In 1941, he moved on to the Big Spring Bombers and batted .335/?/.524 with 99 runs, 30 doubles, 11 triples, 16 homers, 18 steals and 115 RBI.

In 1942, Greer split time between the Santa Barbara Saints (.319/?/.489, 60 R in 68 games) and the Dayton Ducks (.259/?/.393). Overall, he scored 108 runs, hit 45 doubles and stole 22 bases. He led the California League in runs and doubles (26). Stubby then missed the 1943–1945 seasons due to military service, perhaps costing him any shot at the majors.

In 1946, Stubby returned as player-manager of the Abilene Blue Sox. Greer led the West Texas–New Mexico League in hits (202) and steals (38) and his team had a .708 winning percentage. Greer was named MVP and All-Star shortstop. He hit .358/~.430/.577. He was third in the league in total bases (326), 5th in average, fourth in runs (146) and led shortstops in fielding percentage (.956, 20 points ahead of the runner-up). He hit 23 home runs, 39 doubles and 8 triples and drove in 131 in 135 games. He also fielded .962 in 28 games at second base, the best in the league for players with 15+ games there.

Returning to Abilene in 1947, he hit .345/?/.537 and scored 110 runs in 112 games. He hit 16 homers and stole 25 bases. He also spent 24 games with the Mobile Bears, hitting a fine .366/?/.427.

Returning as Mobile's regular third baseman in 1948 for his only full season at AA, he batted .276/?/.382, solid numbers but far from what he had done in the low minors. Returning to Abilene in 1949, Greer hit .326/?/.520 with 19 homers, 106 RBI, 28 steals and 122 runs in 118 games. He also managed the team to a second-place finish.

In his usual role as Abilene's player-manager, the 30-year-old hit .330/~.435/.553 while his team fell to a disappointing last place. In 1951, Greer moved on to the Artesia Drillers and they too finished last. He batted .331/?/.549 with 18 homers and 18 steals. In 1952, Greer joined the Roswell Rockets, but only as player, not manager. He hit .360/~.412/.650 with 15 home runs, 117 RBI and 44 doubles, second in the Longhorn League. He also led the Longhorn League's regular shortstops in fielding percentage (.954) and was named All-Star shortstop.

In 1953, Stubby started the year as player-manager of the Brownsville Charros and held that role until June 10. He hit .310/~.374/.458 in 57 games. He then joined up with the Amarillo Gold Sox and batted .365/~.452/.642 in 32 games there.

Greer returned to Roswell in 1954, just in time to be teammates with Joe Bauman in Bauman's legendary 70-homer campaign. Several sources now list Greer as finishing second to Bauman on Roswell in homers, with 12, but the sources of the time list him with 13, third on the club. He hit .398/~.477/.603 in that hitter-friendly league. He scored 122 runs and drove in 101 in 103 games as a 3B/OF. He was second to Bauman in OBP and average, losing the batting title race to his now-legendary teammate by two points.

In 1955, Greer managed Roswell to a second-place finish, in his final season in the driver's seat. He batted .337/?/.564 with 39 doubles, 8 triples, 22 homers, 111 runs and 113 RBI in 123 games.

In 1956, Stubby moved on to the Victoria Eagles but struggled, only hitting .210/?/.261 in 37 games. The next year, he wrapped up his career with the Ballinger Westerners, batting .314/~.381/.508 with 16 home runs.

Playing in high-offense leagues primarily, Greer hit .330/?/.519 in 1,669 minor league games. He scored 1,348 runs, drove in 1,274, hit 441 doubles, 80 triples and 204 home runs and stole 212 bases.

Sources: 1947, 1951, 1953, 1954, 1955 and 1958 Baseball Guides, The Minor League Register ed. by W. Lloyd Johnson, Minor League Baseball.com profile of the 1946 Abilene Blue Sox

== Year-by-year managerial record ==
Year	Team	League	Record	Finish	Organization	Playoffs	
1946	Abilene Blue Sox	West Texas–New Mexico League	97–40	1st	Brooklyn Dodgers	Lost in 1st round	
1947	Abilene Blue Sox	West Texas–New Mexico League			Brooklyn Dodgers		replaced by Art Bowland
1949	Abilene Blue Sox	West Texas–New Mexico League	73–66	2nd	none	Lost in 1st round	
1950	Abilene Blue Sox	West Texas–New Mexico League	51–92	8th	none		
1951	Artesia Drillers	Longhorn League	45–95	8th	none		
1952							
1953	Brownsville Charros	Gulf Coast League			none		replaced by Walter Sessi
1954							
1955	Roswell Rockets	Longhorn League	79–56	2nd	none	Lost League Finals	
1956	Victoria Eagles	Big State League			none		replaced Lou Fitzgerald
