= Midland Indians =

- 1947–1957; (1937–1940, 1947–1959); Midland, Texas

Minor league affiliations
- Class: Class D (1937–1940, 1947–1950); Class C (1951–1955); Class B (1956–1957); Class D (1958–1959)
- League: West Texas-New Mexico League (1937–1940); Longhorn League (1947–1955); Southwestern League (1956–1957); Sophomore League (1958–1959)

Major league affiliations
- Team: St. Louis Cardinals (1937–1938); Washington Senators (1957); Milwaukee Braves (1958–1959)

Minor league titles
- League titles (3): 1948; 1952; 1958
- Conference titles (1): 1958
- Wild card berths (5): 1947; 1948; 1952; 1953; 1954

Team data
- Name: Midland Cardinals (1937–1938); Midland Cowboys (1939–1940); Midland Indians (1947–1957); Midland Braves (1958–1959)
- Ballpark: City Park (1928–1929, 1937–1940, 1947–1951); Christensen Stadium (1952–1959)

The Midland Indians were a minor league baseball team based in Midland, Texas. Between 1937 and 1959, Midland teams played as members of West Texas-New Mexico League (1937–1940), Longhorn League (1947–1955), Southwestern League (1956–1957) and Sophomore League (1958–1959), while hosting minor league games at City Park and then Christensen Stadium. Midland teams played as a minor league affiliate of the St. Louis Cardinals (1937–1938), Milwaukee Braves (1958–1959) and Washington Senators (1957).

Baseball Hall of Fame member Travis Jackson was manager of the 1958 Midland Indians.

Today, Midland hosts the Midland Rockhounds of the Class AA level Texas League.

== History ==
The Indians were preceded in Midland by the Midland Colts, who played the 1928 and 1929 seasons as members of the West Texas League. The Colts were followed by the Midland Cardinals (1937–1938) and Midland Cowboys (1939–1940), who played as members of the West Texas-New Mexico League. The Midland Cardinals were an affiliate of the St. Louis Cardinals in 1937 and 1938.

The Midland Indians were members of the Class C level Longhorn League from 1947 to 1955 and remained in the league as it evolved into both the Class B level Southwestern League in 1956 and Class D level Sophomore League in 1958. Midland was a minor league affiliate of the Washington Senators in 1957 and the Milwaukee Braves in 1958 and 1959, changing its moniker to match the Braves.

In 1947, the Midland Indians became charter members of the Longhorn League. The Indians joined the new six–team league with fellow members Ballinger Cats, Big Spring Broncs, Odessa Oilers, Sweetwater Sports and Vernon Dusters.

The 1947 Midland Indians finished with a record of 75–55 to place second in the regular season standings. In the playoffs, the Ballinger Cats defeated Midland 4 games to 3.

The 1948 Midland Indians captured the Longhorn League Championship. Midland finished with a record of 79–60 to place third in the regular season standings. In the playoffs, Midland defeated the Odessa Oilers 4 games to 0 in a sweep. In the Finals, the Midland Indians defeated the Vernon Dusters 4 games to 3 and captured the championship. The team drew 51,865 for home games, an average of 746.

Midland finished with a 66–87 record and in seventh place in 1950. The 1951 Midland Indians finished with a record of 69–70, and in fifth place. The Indians missed the playoffs in both seasons.

In 1952, the Midland Indians won their second Longhorn League Championship. In the 1952 regular season, Midland finished in third place with a 85–55 record. In the playoffs, the Midland Indians defeated the Big Spring Broncs 4 games to 0. In the Finals, the Indians defeated the Odessa Oilers 4 games to 2 to secure the championship. The Midland season attendance was 64,188, an average of 917 per game.

The 1953 Indians advanced to the Longhorn State League Finals. Midland finished with a record of 73–58 to place third in the regular season standings. In the playoffs, the Midland Indians defeated the San Angelo Colts 4 games to 3. In the league Finals, the Carlsbad Potashers defeated the Midland Indians 4 games to 2. Season attendance was 52,035, an average of 794.

Midland finished in fourth place in 1954 with a record of 80–59. In the playoffs, the Artesia Numexers, behind Joe Bauman, who hit .400 with 72 home runs and 224 RBI, defeated Midland 4 games to 2. Season home attendance was 43,109 in 1954.

In their final Longhorn State Season, the Midland Indians finished with a record of 62–72 in 1955. Placing fifth, the team did not qualify the four-team playoffs.

Playing in the Class B level Southwestern League in 1956, the Indians placed eighth with a record of 63–81. The Longhorn State League had reorganized to become the Southwestern League, expanding to ten teams. Attendance was 77,601, an average of 1,078.

The Midland Indians became an affiliate of the Washington Senators in 1957, as the Southwestern League played with eight teams. However, near the end of the season, the franchise moved to Lamesa, Texas on August 1, 1957, and finished the 1957 season as the Lamesa Indians. The team drew 19,212, finished 45–79 and were fourth of the remaining teams, as the Clovis Redlegs, El Paso Texans, Pampa Oilers/San Angelo Colts and Plainview Ponies all folded mid-season. There were no 1957 playoffs. The Southwestern League folded after the 1957 season.

The franchise reformed as the Midland Braves in 1958 and captured the league championship in a new league. Midland became an affiliate of the Milwaukee Braves and joined the newly formed six–team Sophomore League. Fellow members were the Artesia Giants, Carlsbad Potashers, Hobbs Cardinals, Plainview Athletics and San Angelo Pirates.

The 1958 Midland Braves finished 72–48, first place in the regular season, as they captured the East Division. In the Finals, the Midland Braves defeated the West Division winner Artesia Giants 3 games to 1 to win the 1958 Sophomore League Championship. Midland had a season attendance of 28,210.

In 1959, Midland finished 56–70, placing second in the South Division, as the Sophomore League expanded to eight teams. In the playoffs, the Carlsbad Potashers defeated the Midland Braves 2 games to 0. Midland drew 17,106, an average of 272. Midland folded after the 1959 season, as the Sophomore League reduced from eight teams to six.

In 1972, the Midland Indians were succeeded by the Midland Cubs, who joined the Class AA Texas League. Midland has since remained as a member of the Texas League without interruption.

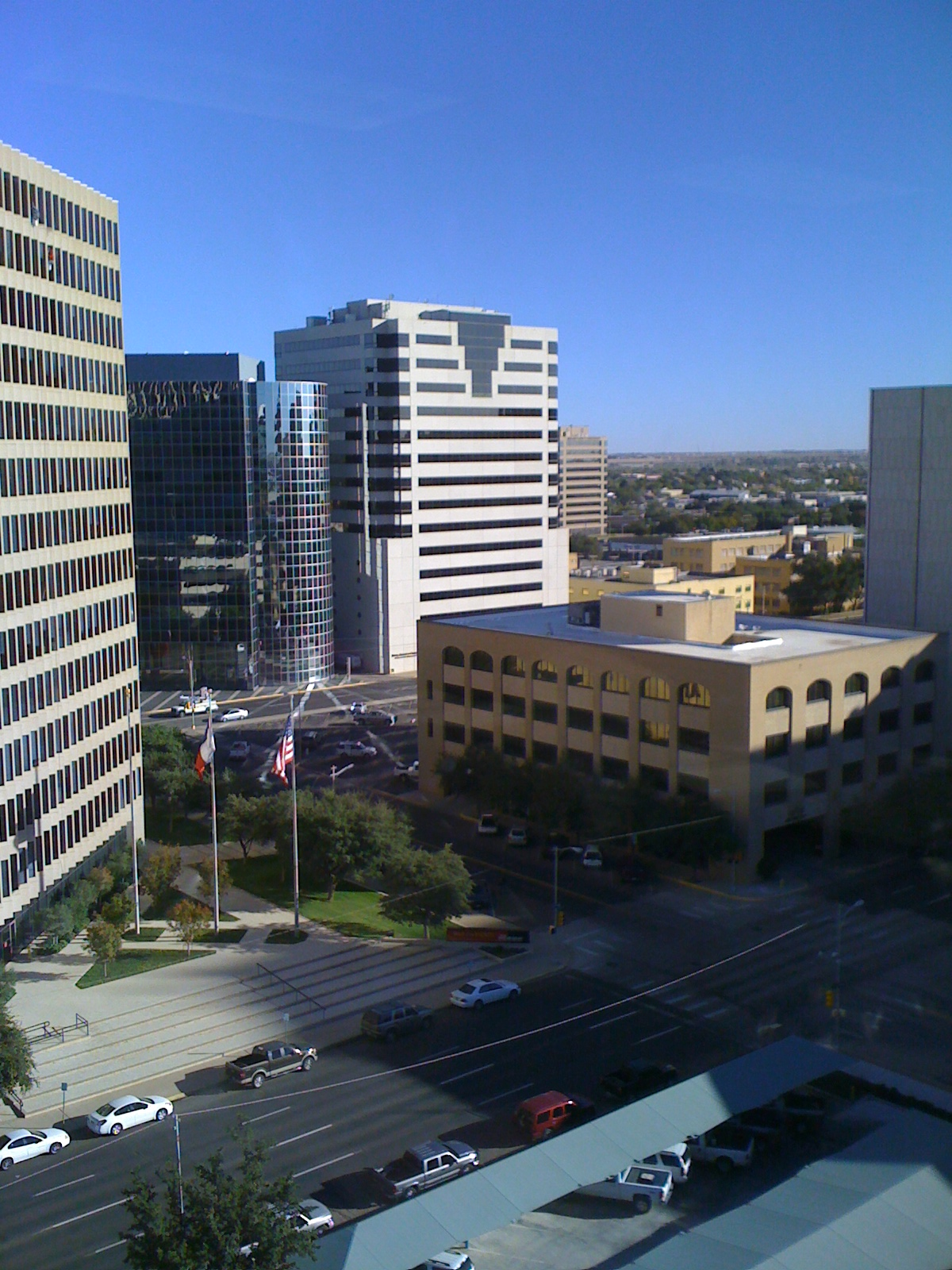
(2011) Midland, Texas

== The ballparks ==
Through 1951, Midland minor league teams hosted minor league home games at City Park.

Beginning in 1952, Midland teams hosted home games at Christensen Stadium in Midland. Christensen Stadium was home to the Midland Indians from 1952 to 1957, the Midland Braves (1958–1959). After a hiatus, the ballpark then served as home to the Midland Cubs (1972–1984), Midland Angels (1985–1998) and the Midland Rockhounds (1999–2001).

Christensen Stadium had a seating capacity of 5,000. Located at 4300 North Lamesa Road in Midland, Texas, the ballpark is still in use today. Today Christensen Stadium is home to the Midland College Chaparral baseball team and is utilized by local high school baseball teams.

== Notable alumni ==
- Travis Jackson (1958, MGR) Inducted Baseball Hall of Fame, 1982
- Zeke Bonura (1951-1952)
- Jimmy Brown (1958, MGR) MLB All–Star
- Tony Cloninger (1958)
- Sammy Hale (1939-1940, MGR)
- Denis Menke (1958) 2x MLB All-Star
- Gene Moore (1929) MLB All–Star
- Phil Roof (1959)

== See also ==
- Midland Braves players
- Midland Cardinals players
- Midland Cowboys players
- Midland Indians players
