= Vernon Dusters =

- 1947–1952; Vernon, Texas

Minor league affiliations
- Class: Class D (1947–1950); Class C (1951–1952)
- League: Longhorn League (1947–1952)

Major league affiliations
- Team: None

Minor league titles
- League titles (0): None
- Wild card berths (3): 1948; 1949; 1950

Team data
- Name: Vernon Dusters (1947–1952)
- Ballpark: Wilbarger Memorial Stadium (1947–1952)

The Vernon Dusters were a minor league baseball team based in Vernon, Texas. From 1947 to 1952, the Dusters played exclusively as members of the Longhorn League, qualifying for the playoffs on three occasions. Hosting home games at Wilbarger Memorial Stadium, the Dusters were the only minor league team based in Vernon, Texas.

== History ==
Minor league baseball started in Vernon in 1947, when the Vernon "Dusters" became charter members of the six-team Class D level Longhorn League. The Ballinger Cats, Big Spring Broncs, Midland Indians, Odessa Oilers and Sweetwater Sports joined Vernon in beginning Longhorn League play on April 23, 1947.

In their first season of play, the Dusters finished in last place. With a 42–87 record, the Vernon Dusters placed sixth in their first season of play Longhorn League play. Vernon drew 30,758 fans at home games for the 1947 season.

In 1948, the San Angelo Colts and Del Rio Cowboys joined the Longhorn League as the league expanded to eight teams. The Vernon Dusters placed fourth in the eight-team league with a 76–64 record, playing under manager Lloyd Rigby, drawing 50,250 fans. In the playoffs, Vernon defeated the Big Spring Broncs four games to two to advance. In the Finals, the Vernon Dusters lost to the Midland Indians in seven games.

The Dusters qualified for the playoffs in 1949. The Dusters finished with a record of 72–66 in 1949, placing third in the Longhorn League. Vernon lost to the Midland Indians four games to one in their playoff series. Vernon drew 50,386 for the season.

In 1949, Monty Stratton pitched briefly for the Vernon Dusters. Stratton had been a major league pitcher, whose career was affected after a 1939 hunting accident that necessitated his right leg being amputated below the knee. Stratton pitched a complete-game shutout for the Vernon Dusters on a wooden right leg. Stratton was the inspiration for the feature film The Stratton Story starring James Stewart. The film opened in theaters in June, 1949.

The 1950 Vernon Dusters finished with a record of 83–70, placing fourth in the Longhorn League final standings. They lost to the Odessa Oilers four games to one in the playoffs. Vernon drew 46,099 fans for the season.

In 1951, the Vernon Dusters did not qualify for the playoffs. Vernon finished with a regular season record of 67–71 and a sixth-place finish. The team drew 36,686 home game fans in 1951.

In 1952, Vernon played their final season and finished last. The Vernon Dusters finished with a record of 45–95, placing last in the Longhorn League. Vernon drew 30,015 total home game fans for the season. The franchise folded after the 1952 season.

Vernon, Texas has not hosted another minor league team.

== The ballpark ==
The Vernon Dusters hosted minor league home games at Wilbarger Memorial Stadium. The ballpark had a capacity of 3,000 in 1947 and 3,500 in 1950. Wilbarger Memorial Stadium was located at 1826 Pease Street, Main Street & Wilbarger Street in Vernon, Texas.

== Timeline ==
Year(s)	# Yrs.	Team	Level	League	Ballpark
1947–1950	4	Vernon Dusters	Class D	Longhorn League	Wilbarger Memorial Stadium
1951–1952	2	Vernon Dusters	Class C	Longhorn League	Wilbarger Memorial Stadium

== Year–by–year records ==
Year	Record	Finish	Manager	Playoffs/Notes
1947	42–87	6th	Carl Kott	Did not qualify
1948	76–64	4th	Lloyd Rigby	Lost league finals
1949	72–66	3rd	Robert Huntley	Lost 1st round
1950	86–70	4th	Joe Berry	Lost 1st round
1951	67–71	6th	Joe Berry / Homer Matney	Did not qualify
1952	45–95	8th	Chester Fowler / Albert Richardson; Pat McLaughlin	Did not qualify

== Notable alumni ==
- Joe Berry (1950–1951, MGR)
- Jerry Fahr (1947–1948)
- Jim King (1950)
- Pat McLaughlin (1952, MGR)
- Monty Stratton (1949) Feature film: The Stratton Story

=== See also ===
Vernon Dusters players
