= Howie McFarland =

American baseball player (1910–1993)

- Outfielder
- Born: March 7, 1910; El Reno, Oklahoma, U.S.
- Died: April 7, 1993 (aged 83); Wichita, Kansas, U.S.
- Batted: Right Threw: Right

MLB debut
- July 16, 1945, for the Washington Senators

Last MLB appearance
- August 16, 1945, for the Washington Senators

MLB statistics
- Games played: 6
- At bats: 11
- Hits: 1
- Stats at Baseball Reference

Teams
- Washington Senators (1945)

Howard Alexander McFarland (March 7, 1910 – April 7, 1993) was an American baseball player in both professional and semi-pro leagues who appeared in six games for the Washington Senators of Major League Baseball in 1945—the last year of MLB's World War II manpower shortage—after a seven-year hiatus from the professional ranks. Born in El Reno, Oklahoma, he was an outfielder who threw and batted right-handed, stood 6 feet (1.8 m) tall and weighed 175 pounds (79 kg).

McFarland had played in the minor leagues from 1932 to 1937, spending the latter season with the Class A1 Chattanooga Lookouts, a Senators' farm system affiliate. He then left pro ball for nearly eight full seasons. In July 1945, the Senators, battling the Detroit Tigers for the American League pennant and "desperate for players," signed McFarland to a big-league contract. He was used by Washington manager Ossie Bluege in six games, with one start in right field against the Boston Red Sox on August 4. Six days later, he collected his only MLB hit, an RBI single off Thornton Lee of the Chicago White Sox at Comiskey Park. His last appearance for Washington came on August 16, when he flied out as a pinch hitter against the Tigers' Hall of Fame left-hander, Hal Newhouser.

In his six games in the majors, McFarland had 11 plate appearances, with one hit, no runs scored, no bases on balls, and two career runs batted in. He batted .091. He didn't play pro ball in 1946, but returned to the minor leagues in 1947 for one last season, batting .362 for Odessa in the Class D Longhorn League.

Howard McFarland died in Wichita, Kansas, aged 83, in 1993.
