= Jaycee Park (Plainview, Texas) =

Ballpark in Plainview, Texas, US

- Interactive map of Jaycee Park
- Full name: Jaycee Park
- Location: Plainview, Texas
- Coordinates: 34.1769°N 101.7016°W

Tenants
- Plainview Ponies (West Texas–New Mexico League) (1953–1955); Plainview Ponies (Southwestern League) (1956–1957); Plainview Athletics (Sophomore League) (1958–1959)

Jaycee Park is a ballpark located in Plainview, Texas, and was the home to the Plainview Ponies and the Plainview Athletics. The field has also been used for UIL games over the years.

== Sources ==
- "Texas Almanac 2008–2009", Dallas Morning News, c. 2008
