= Plainview Athletics =

- 1953–1959; (1953-1959); Plainview, Texas

Minor league affiliations
- Class: Class C (1953–1954); Class B (1955–1957); Class D (1958–1959)
- League: West Texas-New Mexico League (1953–1955); Southwestern League (1956–1957); Sophomore League (1958–1959)

Major league affiliations
- Team: Kansas City Athletics (1958–1959)

Minor league titles
- League titles (0): None

Team data
- Name: Plainview Ponies (1953–1957); Plainview Athletics (1958–1959)
- Ballpark: Jaycee Park (1953–1959)

The Plainview Athletics (or the interchangeable "A's") were a minor league baseball team based in Plainview, Texas. The Plainview Ponies played as members of the West Texas-New Mexico League from 1953 to 1955 and Southwestern League in 1956 and 1957, before the Plainview Athletics, playing as a minor league affiliate of the Kansas City Athletics, became members of the Sophomore League in 1958 and 1959. Plainview hosted minor league home games at Jaycee Park.

== History ==
The 1953 Plainview Ponies began minor league baseball play in Plainview, Texas as members of the Class C level West Texas-New Mexico League.

In 1953 West Texas-New Mexico League play, Plainview finished the regular season with a record of 80–62, playing under manager Jackie Sullivan. The Ponies placed fourth in the standings, finishing 7.0 games behind the first place Albuquerque Dukes and qualifying for the playoffs. In the Playoffs, the Clovis Pioneers defeated the Plainview Ponies 4 games to 2. Playing at Jaycee Park, Plainview had total season home attendance of 79,780, an average of 1,124 per game.

The Plainview Ponies continued play in the 1954 as members of the Class B level West Texas-New Mexico League. The Ponies had a record of 60–73, placing sixth in the West Texas-New Mexico League, finishing 20.0 games behind the champion Pampa Oilers. Season attendance at Jaycee Park was 56,071, an average of 843.

Plainview placed fourth in the 1955 West Texas-New Mexico League standings and qualified for the playoffs. The Ponies ended the 1955 season with a record of 73–67, finishing 7.0 games behind the first place Amarillo Gold Sox. The 1955 managers were Jackie Sullivan and Jodie Beeler. In the 1955 Playoffs, the Amarillo Gold Sox defeated Plainview 4 games to 2. Jaycee Park had home attendance of 63,269, an average of 904.

The 1956 Plainview Ponies became members of the Class B level Southwestern League. Plainview ended the 1956 regular season with a record of 76–68, placing fifth in the Southwestern League, finishing 15.0 games behind the first place Hobbs Sports in the 15–team league. Jodie Beeler and Frank Tornay served as managers. The Ponies hit 238 home runs as a team, led by 60 from Frosty Kennedy. Season attendance was 43,892, an average of 610.

In 1957, the Plainview Ponies folded from the Southwestern League during the season. On June 16. 1957, the Ponies had a record of 16–27 under manager Art Bowland when the franchise folded. At the time of their folding, Plainview had total season attendance of 5,321, an average of 247 per game. The Southwestern League folded after the season.

Plainview regained a franchise in 1958. The Plainview Athletics became members of the newly formed Class D level Sophomore League as an affiliate of the Kansas City Athletics. Plainview ended the 1958 season with a record of 50–57, placing sixth in the Sophomore League standings. The Ponies finished 22.0 games behind the first place Midland Braves playing under manager Vincent Plumbo. Plainview drew total season attendance of 21,640, an average of 361 per game.

In their final season of play, the 1959 Plainview Athletics placed fourth in the Sophomore League. The Athletics ended season with a record of 60–65, finishing 11.5 games behind the first place Carlsbad Potashers, playing under manager Bobby Hofman. Plainview had season attendance of 12,329, an average of 197 per game. The franchise permanently folded after the 1959 season.

The Athletics did not return to the 1960 Sophomore League. Plainview, Texas has not hosted another minor league team.

=== 60 Home Run season ===
In the 1956 season, Frosty Kennedy hit 60 Home Runs and had 184 RBI, playing for the Plainview Ponies.

== The ballpark ==
Plainview teams played minor league home games at Jaycee Park. The ballpark is still in use today, located within Broadway Park. The park is located at 100 South Broadway in Plainview, Texas.

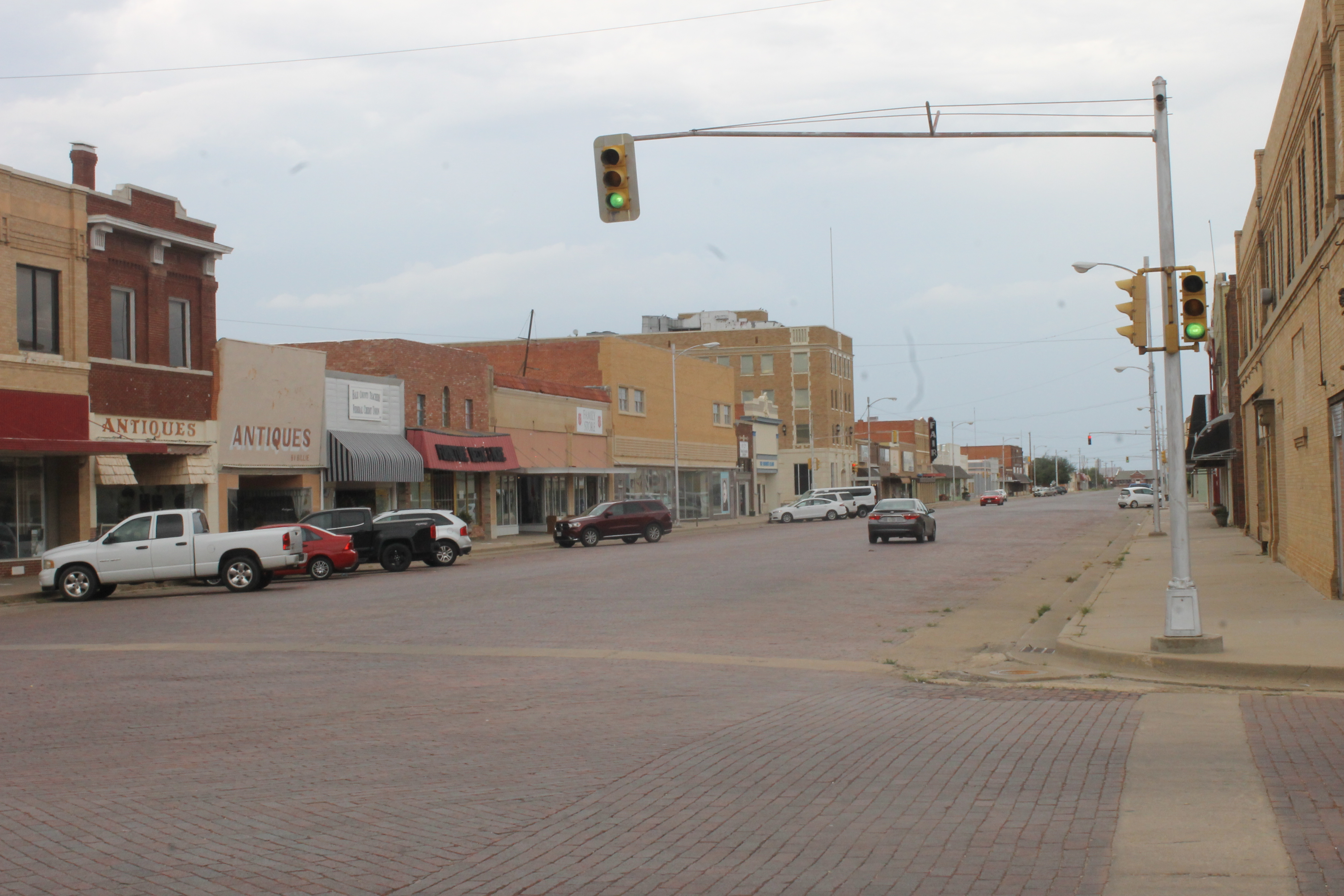
(2018) Downtown. Plainview, Texas

== Notable alumni ==
- Jodie Beeler (1955-1956, MGR)
- Bobby Hofman (1959)
- Cliff Ross (1956)
- Jackie Sullivan (1953-1955, MGR)
- Sam Woods (1957)

=== See also ===
Plainview Ponies players
