= Evelio Hernández (baseball) =

Cuban baseball player (1930-2015)

- Pitcher
- Born: December 24, 1930; Guanabacoa, Cuba
- Died: December 18, 2015 (aged 84); Miami, Florida, U.S.
- Batted: Right Threw: Right

MLB debut
- September 12, 1956, for the Washington Senators

Last MLB appearance
- June 23, 1957, for the Washington Senators

MLB statistics
- Win–loss record: 1–1
- Earned run average: 4.45
- Innings pitched: 58 2/3
- Stats at Baseball Reference

Teams
- Washington Senators (1956–1957)

Gregorio Evelio Hernández López (December 24, 1930 – December 18, 2015) was a Cuban right-handed pitcher who appeared in 18 games for the 1956–1957 Washington Senators of Major League Baseball. He stood 6 feet 1 inch (1.85 m) tall and weighed 195 pounds (88 kg).

Hernández' professional career on the North American mainland spanned 11 seasons (1954–1958; 1961–1964; 1966–1967) and 370 games in United States and Mexican league baseball. His notable seasons included 1955, when he won 23 games and lost 15 while pitching in 55 games and 271 innings for the Hobbs Sports of the Class C Longhorn League, and the following year, 1956, when he won 18 and lost 4, compiling a stellar 2.86 earned run average, for the Charlotte Hornets of the Class A Sally League. That performance earned him a late-season call-up to the Senators, when he appeared in four games.

Hernández split the next season between Charlotte, the Double-A Chattanooga Lookouts, and the Senators, for whom he worked in 14 more games. Altogether, his Major League record included one complete game, a 1–1 won-lost record (with an ERA of 4.45), 28 bases on balls and 24 strikeouts in 58 2/3 innings.
