= George Genovese =

American baseball player (1922-2015)

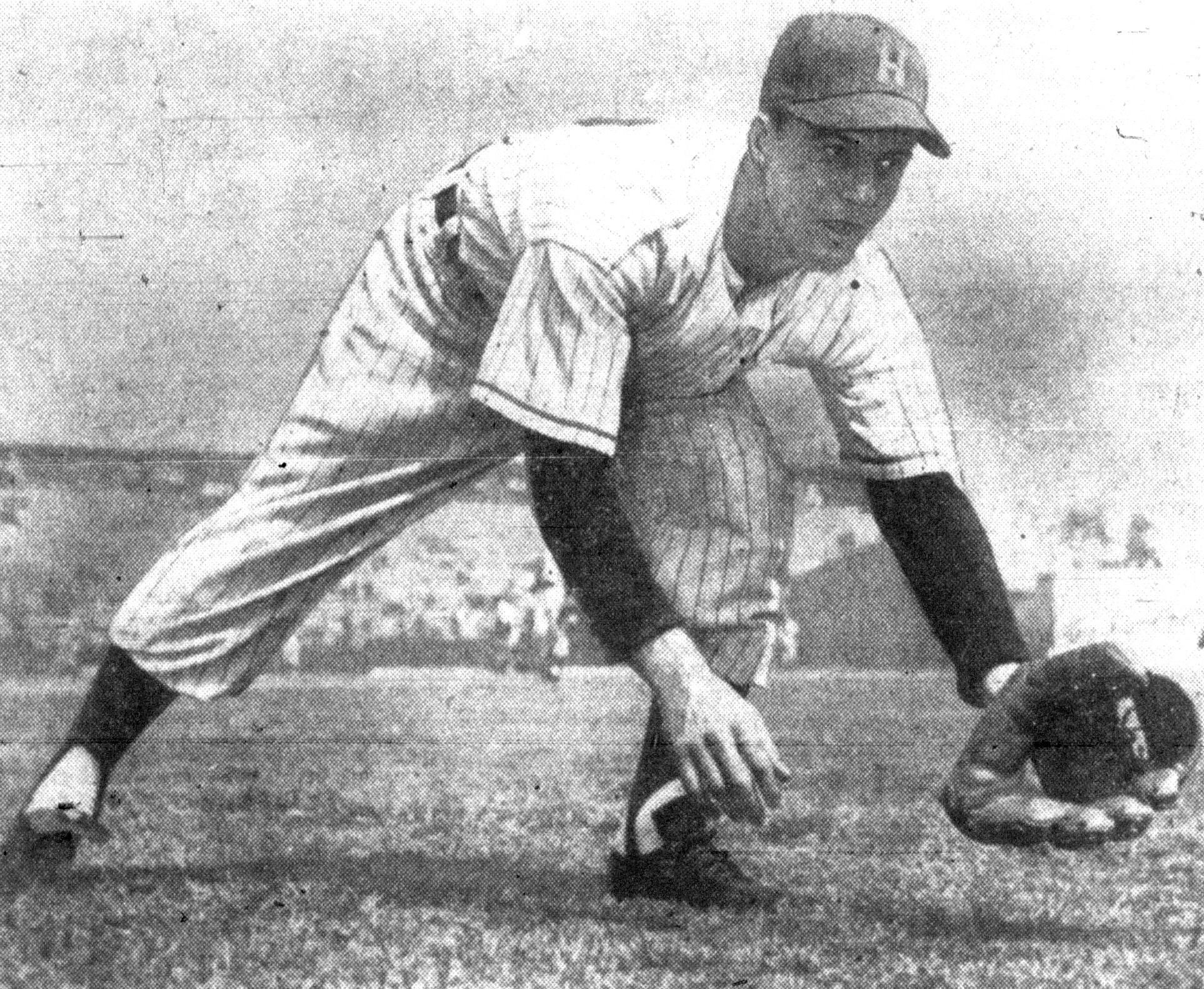
- Genovese, circa 1951
- Pinch hitter
- Born: February 22, 1922; Staten Island, New York, U.S.
- Died: November 15, 2015 (aged 93); Burbank, California, U.S.
- Batted: Left Threw: Right

MLB debut
- April 29, 1950, for the Washington Senators

Last MLB appearance
- May 6, 1950, for the Washington Senators

MLB statistics
- Batting average: .000
- Home runs: 0
- Runs batted in: 0
- Stats at Baseball Reference

Teams
- Washington Senators (1950)

George Genovese (February 22, 1922 – November 15, 2015) was an American Washington Senators baseball player who played for the team in 1950. He also played in the minor leagues for 15 seasons and managed at that level for over a decade. He was born in Staten Island, New York.

== Playing career ==
Genovese began his major league career on April 29, 1950, appearing as a pinch hitter for pitcher Ray Scarborough. He would walk against New York Yankees' pitcher Allie Reynolds in his first career plate appearance. In his next game, May 5, Genovese pinch hit for pitcher Mickey Harris and grounded out. He pinch ran for catcher Al Evans in his third and final game (May 6), scoring a run when Eddie Yost doubled him home two batters later.

He played considerably longer in the minor leagues, beginning his career in 1940 and ending it in 1957, at the age of 35. He did not play from 1943 to 1945, as minor league baseball was interrupted due to World War II, a war in which he served. A shortstop in the minors, Genovese played in at least 1,387 games, collecting at least 1,162 hits (of which at least 241 were for extra bases). His minor league record is incomplete, though it is known he spent the final three seasons of his playing career with the Mexico City Tigers of the Mexican League. His brothers, Frank and Tony Genovese, also played in the minor leagues.

== Professional career ==
Genovese managed the Batavia Clippers (1952), St. Jean Canadians (1953), Hutchinson Elks (1954), Salinas Packers (1954), Tigres del México (1955–1958), Artesia Giants (1960) and El Paso Sun Kings (1961–1963). He led the Tigres to a league championship victory in 1955. In 1957 he led them to the league finals, which they lost. In 1962 and 1963 he led the Sun Kings to the Texas League playoffs, which they lost in the first round.

He was later a scout for the San Francisco Giants, St. Louis Cardinals, Florida Marlins and Los Angeles Dodgers. Covering Southern California for the Giants from 1964 through 1995, he played a major role in the signing of about 40 players who eventually made the major leagues, including Jim Barr, Bobby Bonds, Jack Clark, Chili Davis, Rob Deer, George Foster, Eric King, Dave Kingman, Garry Maddox, Gary Matthews, Randy Moffitt, Matt Nokes, Matt Williams. He also signed future CBS Sportscaster Rich Perez in 86.

George's brother, Frank "Chick" Genovese, was also a successful scout, having signed Juan Marichal and the three Alou brothers; Matty, Felipe, and Jesús.

== Death and legacy ==
Genovese died on November 15, 2015, aged 93. He was interred at Forest Lawn Memorial Park (Hollywood Hills).

Major League Baseball (MLB) annually conducts the George Genovese Lifetime Achievement Awards.

Genovese was inducted into the Staten Island Sports Hall of Fame in 2005.

== See also ==
- List of people from Staten Island § Baseball
