= Fred Caligiuri =

American baseball player (1918-2018)

- Pitcher
- Born: October 22, 1918; West Hickory, Pennsylvania, U.S.
- Died: November 30, 2018 (aged 100); Charlotte, North Carolina, U.S.
- Batted: Right Threw: Right

MLB debut
- September 3, 1941, for the Philadelphia Athletics

Last MLB appearance
- September 20, 1942, for the Philadelphia Athletics

MLB statistics
- Win–loss record: 2-5
- Earned run average: 4.52
- Strikeouts: 27
- Stats at Baseball Reference

Teams
- Philadelphia Athletics (1941–1942)

Frederick John Caligiuri (October 22, 1918 – November 30, 2018) was an American professional baseball pitcher in Major League Baseball (MLB) who played for the Philadelphia Athletics from 1941 to 1942. Listed at 6' 0", 190 lbs., he batted and threw right-handed.

== Biography ==
A native of West Hickory, Pennsylvania, Caligiuri was one of many major leaguers who saw their baseball careers interrupted by a stint with the United States Armed Forces during World War II.

A late-season 1941 call-up from Wilmington of the Interstate League, he entered the baseball record books while starting the last game of the season against the Boston Red Sox at Shibe Park. It was the game in which Ted Williams finished the season with a .406 batting average, the most recent .400 average in the majors. Williams went 2-for-3 against Caligiuri, who did not yield a run until the ninth inning, and finished with a complete game, six-hit, 7–1 victory over Baseball Hall of Fame standout Lefty Grove and his Red Sox, a game which also marked the last start for Grove, who retired before the 1942 season.

Over parts of two seasons, Caligiuri posted a 2–5 record with a 4.52 ERA in 18 appearances, including seven starts, giving up 49 runs (nine unearned) on 90 hits and 32 walks while striking out 27 in 79 2/3 innings of work.

From 1943 to 1945, Caligiuri served in the United States Army during World War II.

His wife of 73 years, Anne, died at the age of 91 on October 11, 2014.

Caligiuri died in Charlotte, North Carolina on November 30, 2018, at the age of 100. Caligiuri was recognized as the oldest living major league ballplayer until his death, with Tom Jordan succeeding him. Caligiuri was the last surviving retired MLB player who made his debut in the majors prior to the Pearl Harbor attack, which led to the United States' involvement in World War II.

On April 20, 2021, his sister Vi died in Florida at the age of 103.

Records
Preceded by Chuck Stevens	Oldest recognized verified living baseball player May 28, 2018 – November 30, 2018	Succeeded by Tom Jordan
