= Sam Woods (baseball) =

American baseball player

- Pitcher
- Born: July 2, 1920; Springfield, Ohio, U.S.
- Died: September 5, 1983 (aged 63); Las Vegas, Nevada, U.S.
- Batted: Right Threw: Right

Negro league baseball debut
- 1946, for the Cleveland Buckeyes

Last appearance
- 1948, for the Memphis Red Sox

Teams
- Cleveland Buckeyes (1946); Memphis Red Sox (1948)

Samuel Nelson Woods (July 2, 1920 – September 5, 1983) was an American Negro league pitcher in the 1940s.

A native of Springfield, Ohio, Woods attended Springfield High School. He made his Negro leagues debut in 1946 with the Cleveland Buckeyes, and played for the Memphis Red Sox in 1948. Woods went on to play minor league baseball in the 1950s with such clubs as the Pampa Oilers and Plainview Ponies. He died in Las Vegas, Nevada in 1983 at age 63.
