= Welch, Oklahoma =

Town in Oklahoma, US

- Town
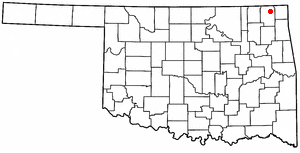
- Location of Welch, Oklahoma
- Coordinates: 36°52′29″N 95°05′38″W
- Country: United States
- State: Oklahoma
- County: Craig

Area
  - Total: 0.51 sq mi (1.33 km^{2})
  - Land: 0.51 sq mi (1.33 km^{2})
  - Water: 0 sq mi (0.00 km^{2})
- Elevation: 827 ft (252 m)

Population (2020)
  - Total: 622
  - Density: 1,213.0/sq mi (468.36/km^{2})
- Time zone: UTC-6 (Central (CST))
  - Summer (DST): UTC-5 (CDT)
- ZIP code: 74369
- Area codes: 539/918
- FIPS code: 40-79750
- GNIS feature ID: 2413462

Welch is a town in northern Craig County, Oklahoma, United States. As of the 2020 census, Welch had a population of 622. It is 8 miles (13 km) south of the Kansas state line, at the intersection of state highways 2 and 10 with U.S. Highway 59.

== History ==
Welch was established in 1888 in the Cherokee Nation on land that D. B. Nigh leased from Frank Craig. The Missouri, Kansas and Texas Railway (Katy) had built a line through the area in 1871, and in 1891 it built a switch on Nigh's property, providing a shipping point for local hay and grain. The town that began to grow around the switch was named for a Katy railroad official, A. L. Welch. A post office was established in 1892. The town plat was approved in 1902, and the town incorporated in 1909. A newspaper called the Welch Watchman began publication in 1902, and continued in business, although later renamed as the Welch American, until the mid 1960s.

A joint stock company established the first school in 1899, then sold it to the city in 1907. The first class graduated in 1911.

In 2003, Welch had two convenience stores, a grocery store, a feed store, Thomas Funeral Home, the Blossom Shoppe, a meat processor, a livestock sale barn, two cafés, a new automotive shop, two saddle shops, an assisted-living retirement home, Graham Equipment Company, and a new medical office, among other enterprises. (Note: Although the source of this information seems to imply that this growth resulted from the formation of the Welch Area Development Authority (WADA), this may not be accurate. Another source says that WADA is a private company with one employee that was formed in 1991 with one employee.)

=== 1999 kidnapping and murders ===
On the night of December 29–30, 1999, firefighters responded to a fire reported at the home of Danny and Kathy Freeman in Welch. After extinguishing the blaze, they found the body of Kathy Freeman in one of the bedrooms, where she had been shot in the head, and also found that the fire had been deliberately set. Initially, they found no other bodies, but noticed that both Danny and their teen-age daughter, Ashley, were missing. The family car was in the driveway, with the keys in the ignition. The local police immediately assumed that the father had killed the mother and kidnapped Ashley.

When Lorene and Jay Bible woke on the morning of December 30, they discovered that their daughter, Lauria, had not come home after spending the previous day with Ashley Freeman, her best friend. They found Dan's body in the rubble. He too, had been shot to death. Later that day, they learned that the two girls and Kathy Freeman had been seen earlier that day in the local pizza parlor, celebrating Ashley's birthday. None of them had been seen since.

Sometime during the following decade, news media reported that two convicts, Tommy Lynn Sells and Jeremy Jones, had confessed to murdering the four victims. Their story did not check out, and they recanted their claims. Convicted murderer, Ronnie Busick, had bragged about killing the two girls. He and two alleged accomplices, Phil Welch and David Pennington (Note: Both Welch and Pennington are now deceased, Welch in 2007 and Pennington in 2015. Basic was still in custody, as of April 2018. The case is still under active investigation.) claimed that the victims owed them money, and that they kept the girls alive for awhile hoping to get the money back. They further claimed that they tortured the girls before killing them and dumping the bodies in an Oklahoma mine shaft.

== Geography ==
Welch is 18 miles (29 km) north of Vinita, the county seat, and 13 miles (21 km) west of Miami, the seat of Ottawa County.

According to the United States Census Bureau, the town has a total area of 0.5 square miles (1.3 km^{2}), all land.

== Demographics ==
Historical population
Census	Pop.	Note	%±
1900	334		—
1910	684		104.8%
1920	696		1.8%
1930	448		−35.6%
1940	498		11.2%
1950	483		−3.0%
1960	557		15.3%
1970	651		16.9%
1980	697		7.1%
1990	499		−28.4%
2000	597		19.6%
2010	619		3.7%
2020	622		0.5%
U.S. Decennial Census

=== 2020 census ===
As of the 2020 census, Welch had a population of 622. The median age was 38.0 years. 28.3% of residents were under the age of 18 and 19.0% of residents were 65 years of age or older. For every 100 females there were 95.6 males, and for every 100 females age 18 and over there were 90.6 males age 18 and over.

0.0% of residents lived in urban areas, while 100.0% lived in rural areas.

There were 237 households in Welch, of which 39.2% had children under the age of 18 living in them. Of all households, 48.1% were married-couple households, 11.4% were households with a male householder and no spouse or partner present, and 30.8% were households with a female householder and no spouse or partner present. About 21.9% of all households were made up of individuals and 11.4% had someone living alone who was 65 years of age or older.

There were 276 housing units, of which 14.1% were vacant. The homeowner vacancy rate was 1.1% and the rental vacancy rate was 9.2%.

Racial composition as of the 2020 census
Race	Number	Percent
White	461	74.1%
Black or African American	5	0.8%
American Indian and Alaska Native	87	14.0%
Asian	0	0.0%
Native Hawaiian and Other Pacific Islander	0	0.0%
Some other race	7	1.1%
Two or more races	62	10.0%
Hispanic or Latino (of any race)	22	3.5%

=== 2000 census ===
As of the census of 2000, there were 597 people, 247 households, and 170 families residing in the town. The population density was 1,308.7 inhabitants per square mile (505.3/km^{2}). There were 295 housing units at an average density of 646.7 per square mile (249.7/km^{2}). The racial makeup of the town was 75.38% White, 0.17% African American, 12.90% Native American, 1.34% from other races, and 10.22% from two or more races. Hispanic or Latino of any race were 2.18% of the population.

There were 247 households, out of which 27.9% had children under the age of 18 living with them, 54.3% were married couples living together, 11.7% had a female householder with no husband present, and 30.8% were non-families. 28.3% of all households were made up of individuals, and 17.4% had someone living alone who was 65 years of age or older. The average household size was 2.35 and the average family size was 2.86.

In the town, the population was spread out, with 22.9% under the age of 18, 9.9% from 18 to 24, 23.1% from 25 to 44, 20.6% from 45 to 64, and 23.5% who were 65 years of age or older. The median age was 39 years. For every 100 females, there were 87.7 males. For every 100 females age 18 and over, there were 84.0 males.

The median income for a household in the town was $31,389, and the median income for a family was $38,482. Males had a median income of $22,063 versus $21,944 for females. The per capita income for the town was $14,358. About 8.9% of families and 14.8% of the population were below the poverty line, including 18.8% of those under age 18 and 9.8% of those age 65 or over.

== Economy ==
Agriculture has been the mainstay of Welch's economy since its founding. Henry Brooks Campbell began buying hay in 1889 for a Kansas City hay dealer, leading to the establishment of Campbell Hay and Grain Company, one of the largest hay and grain businesses in northeastern Indian Territory at that time. In 1928 The Maxson family started a cattle auction business in 1928 and 1967 opened the Maxson Sales Barn in 1967. The business was renamed the Welch Livestock Auction, after the Maxsons sold it in 1977. Charley Neill began a cattle-feeding business on his ranch west of town in the 1930s. He and a son formed the Neill Cattle Company in 1960.

Crop production, ranching, and related businesses remain the area's financial anchor.

Welch is one of three towns in the county that still has a bank. The People's Bank was founded in 1901, and a second bank, Oklahoma State Bank, opened in 1910. The two merged in 1923 to form the Welch State Bank.

== Education ==
It is in Welch Public Schools.

== Notable people ==
- Ma Barker, leader of the 1930s Barker gang, is buried in Welch along with two of her sons, Herman and Fred.
- Joe Bauman, baseball player, was born in Welch.
