= Sophomore League =

American Minor League Baseball league (1958–1961)

- Formerly: Southwestern League (1956–1957)
- Classification: Class D (1958–1961)
- Sport: Minor League Baseball
- First season: 1958
- Folded: 1961
- President: Grady Terry (1958–1960); C.F. Montgomery (1960–1961)
- No. of teams: 12
- Country: United States of America
- Most titles: 2 Hobbs Pirates (1960–1961)

The Sophomore League was a Class D level minor league baseball league that operated from 1958 through 1961. League franchises were located in New Mexico and Texas. The league evolved from the Southwestern League, which played in 1956 and 1957. The name change was part of a systemic change. The circuit went from being one with almost no ties to major league baseball to a league where every team was a minor league affiliate of a major league team.

== History ==
The Sophomore League formed in 1958 as a six–team league, evolving from the Southwestern League. The Class D level Sophomore League began play on April 28, 1958, with the Artesia Giants (San Francisco Giants affiliate), Carlsbad Potashers (Chicago Cubs), Hobbs Cardinals (St. Louis Cardinals), Midland Braves (Milwaukee Braves), Plainview Athletics (Kansas City Athletics and San Angelo Pirates (Pittsburgh Pirates) as charter members.

The Midland Braves won the Sophomore League championship in 1958, managed in part by Baseball Hall of Fame member Travis Jackson.

The Sophomore League expanded to eight teams in 1959, adding the Alpine Cowboys (Boston Red Sox affiliate) and Odessa Dodgers (Los Angeles Dodgers). On June 9, 1959, the San Angelo Pirates moved to Roswell, New Mexico. The Roswell Pirates finished the season in Roswell. The San Angelo/Roswell Pirates finished 48–77 overall and in last place. The franchise folded after the season. The Alpine Cowboys won the 1959 Sophomore League championship.

Baseball Hall of Fame member Willie Stargell played in the Sophomore League in 1959 for the San Angelo Pirates/Roswell Pirates, his first professional season. Stargell spoke of the difficulties he faced in playing in the league, with the region still having segregated restaurants and hotels. Stargell was threatened at gunpoint on one road trip. At age 19, Stargell hit .275 with 7 home runs and 87 RBI.

As reported in The Sporting News, Carlsbad Potashers player Gil Carter hit a home run in 1959 that was noteworthy due to its distance. "On a hot August night in 1959, former heavyweight boxer Gil Carter smashed a pitch through Carlsbad's high-elevated air and out of Montgomery Field. The ball carried over the left field wall, soared past two city streets and landed in a peach tree. A newspaper reporter later took an aerial photo from a plane and used the picture to estimate the ball traveled 733 feet. Carter's hometown paper, The Topeka Capital-Journal, said "the blast is considered the longest home run in baseball history."

The official scorer estimated the home run to have traveled 650 feet. However, aerial photographs measurements put the distance at 700–733 feet, which would make it the longest home run ever hit in professional baseball. The ball itself was signed by Carter and he notes the distance of 733 feet.

The Hobbs Pirates won the last two Sophomore League championships in 1960 and 1961.

The Sophomore League presidents were Grady Terry, from 1958 to 1960 and C.F. Montgomery in 1960 and 1961.

== Cities represented ==
- Albuquerque, NM: Albuquerque Dukes 1960–1961
- Alpine, TX: Alpine Cowboys 1959–1961
- Artesia, NM: Artesia Giants 1958–1960; Artesia Dodgers 1961
- Carlsbad, NM: Carlsbad Potashers 1958–1961
- El Paso, TX: El Paso Sun Kings 1961
- Hobbs, NM: Hobbs Cardinals 1958–1959; Hobbs Pirates 1960–1961
- Midland, TX: Midland Braves 1958–1959
- Odessa, TX : Odessa Dodgers 1959–1960
- Plainview, TX: Plainview Athletics 1958–1959
- Roswell, NM: Roswell Pirates 1959
- San Angelo, TX: San Angelo Pirates 1958–1959

== Yearly standings ==
1958 Sophomore League
schedule

Team standings	W	L	PCT	GB	Managers
East Standings
Midland Braves	72	48	.600	–	Travis Jackson / Earl Halstead / Ernie White
San Angelo Pirates	61	59	.508	11.0	Al Kubski
Plainview Athletics	50	70	.417	22.0	Vincent Plumbo
West Standings
Artesia Giants	63	57	.525	–	Jodie Phipps
Hobbs Cardinals	59	61	.492	4.0	Wayne Wallace
Carlsbad Potashers	55	65	.458	8.0	Tony York

Playoff: Midland 3 games, Artesia 1

Player statistics
Player	Team	Stat	Tot	Player	Team	Stat	Tot
Jim Smith	Hobbs	BA	.372	John Ahrens	Hobbs	W	18
Duncan Campbell; Gary Krupsky	San Angelo; Artesia	Runs	116	Ervin Moore	Plainview	SO	175
James McClain	Artesia	Hits	161	Les Bass	Midland	ERA	3.47
Craig Sorenson	Carlsbad	RBI	114	Les Bass	Midland	Pct	.889; 16–2
Kenneth Clark	Hobbs	HR	27				

1959 Sophomore League
schedule

Team standings	W	L	PCT	GB	Managers
North Standings
Carlsbad Potashers	72	54	.571	–	Walt Dixon
Hobbs Cardinals	70	54	.565	1.0	Thurman Tucker
Plainview Athletics	60	65	.480	11.5	Bobby Hofman
Artesia Giants	50	75	.400	21.5	Jodie Phipps
South Standings
Alpine Cowboys	88	34	.721	–	Eddie Popowski
Midland Braves	56	70	.444	34.0	Jimmy Brown
Odessa Dodgers	54	69	.439	34.5	Roy Hartsfield
San Angelo Pirates / Roswell Pirates	48	77	.384	41.5	Al Kubski / Joe Bauman / Walter Millies

Playoffs: Alpine 2 games, Hobbs 0; Carlsbad 2 games, Midland 0.
Finals: Alpine 2 games, Carlsbad 0.

Player statistics
Player	Team	Stat	Tot	Player	Team	Stat	Tot
Emiliano Telleria	San Angelo/Roswell	BA	.358	Don Schwall	Alpine	W	23
Bob Stotsky	Alpine	Runs	132	Terry Barber	Odessa	SO	214
Bob Stotsky	Alpine	Hits	156	Jack Warner	Carlsbad	ERA	2.41
Bob Carruthers	Plainview	RBI	119	Jack Warner	Carlsbad	Pct	.812; 13–3
Gil Carter	Carlsbad	HR	34				

1960 Sophomore League
schedule

Team standings	W	L	PCT	GB	Managers
Alpine Cowboys	76	52	.594	–	Dick Kinaman
Hobbs Pirates	70	58	.547	6.0	Al Kubski
Carlsbad Potashers	66	64	.508	11.0	Verlon Walker
Artesia Giants	62	68	.477	15.0	George Genovese
Albuquerque Dukes	57	72	.442	19.5	Bert Thiel
Odessa Dodgers	57	74	.435	20.5	Edward Serrano

Alpine won the 1st half. Hobbs won the 2nd half.
Playoff: Hobbs 2 games, Alpine 1.

Player statistics
Player	Team	Stat	Tot	Player	Team	Stat	Tot
Gil Garrido	Artesia	BA	.362	Ken Whitmore	Hobbs	W	16
Roberto Pena	Hobbs	Runs	121	Jose Santiago	Albuquerque	SO	217
Jesus Alou	Artesia	Hits	188	Jose Santiago	Albuquerque	ERA	3.30
Dick McLaughlin	Odessa	RBI	109	Frank Bork	Hobbs	Pct	.789; 15–4
Lewis Bishop	Carlsbad	HR	23				

1961 Sophomore League
schedule

Team standings	W	L	PCT	GB	Managers
Hobbs Pirates	77	48	.616	–	Al Kubski
El Paso Sun Kings	73	57	.562	6.5	George Genovese
Albuquerque Dukes	64	63	.504	14.0	Grady Wilson
Alpine Cowboys	62	63	.496	15.0	Mel Parnell
Carlsbad Potashers	56	71	.441	22.0	Lou Klein / Walt Dixon
Artesia Dodgers	48	78	.381	29.5	Spider Jorgensen

Hobbs won the 1st half. Albuquerque won the 2nd half.
Playoff: Hobbs 3 games, Albuquerque 0.

Player statistics
Player	Team	Stat	Tot	Player	Team	Stat	Tot
Tommie Martz	Hobbs	BA	.387	Jim Little	Hobbs	W	17
Jose Cardenal	El Paso	Runs	159	Fred Hatter	Alpine	SO	201
Jose Calero	El Paso	Hits	180	John Drysdale	Artesia	ERA	3.32
Mike Maloney	Albuquerque	RBI	109	Jim Little	Hobbs	Pct	.850; 17–3
Jose Cardenal	El Paso	HR	35				

== Baseball Hall of Fame alumni ==
- Travis Jackson, MGR, 1958 Midland Braves
- Willie Stargell, 1959 San Angelo Pirates/Roswell Pirates
