= San Angelo/Roswell Pirates =

- 1958–1959; San Angelo, Texas Roswell, New Mexico

Minor league affiliations
- Previous classes: Class D
- Previous leagues: Sophomore League

Major league affiliations
- Previous teams: Pittsburgh Pirates

Team data
- Previous names: Roswell Pirates (June 9, 1959-1959); San Angelo Pirates (1958- June 9, 1959)

The San Angelo Pirates were a class-D minor league baseball, club based in San Angelo, Texas. The team first played in 1958 and partially during the following season. On June 9, 1959, the Pirates moved to Roswell, New Mexico to become the Roswell Pirates. In 1959, the San Angelo/Roswell Pirates was the first professional team to feature Willie Stargell, who was elected to the Hall of Fame in 1988. Stargell hit .274 with 7 homeruns and 87 RBI in 118 games with the team.

== Season-by-season ==
Year	Record	Finish	Manager	Playoffs
1958	61-59	3rd	Al Kubski	
1959	48-77†	8th	Al Kubski / Joe Bauman / Wally Millies	

† San Angelo moved to Roswell on June 9, 1959
