= Jerry Fahr =

American baseball player (1924–2010)

- Pitcher
- Born: December 9, 1924; Marmaduke, Arkansas, U.S.
- Died: February 12, 2010 (aged 85); Duluth, Georgia, U.S.
- Batted: Right Threw: Right

MLB debut
- April 29, 1951, for the Cleveland Indians

Last MLB appearance
- June 15, 1951, for the Cleveland Indians

MLB statistics
- Win–loss record: 0–0
- Earned run average: 4.76
- Innings pitched: 5 2/3
- Stats at Baseball Reference

Teams
- Cleveland Indians (1951)

Gerald Warren Fahr (December 9, 1924 – February 12, 2010) was an American professional baseball player, a right-handed pitcher who played in the minor leagues from 1947 to 1956, with the exception of a five-game Major League trial as a relief pitcher for the Cleveland Indians during the 1951 season.

Born in Marmaduke, Arkansas, Fahr made his professional debut with the Vernon Dusters, and played for them for two seasons. In 1947, he had a win-loss record of 16–18, then had a 21–8 record and a 1.96 earned run average (ERA). After spending 1949 with three teams, Fahr played for the Shreveport Sports in 1950, and had a 10–6 record and a 2.72 ERA. At the end of the season, the Cleveland Indians signed him to a contract and added him to the major league roster.

Fahr made his Major League debut on April 29, 1951, for the Indians, allowing three hits, a base on balls and two earned runs in one inning against the St. Louis Browns. However, in his final four games he had 4 2/3 innings pitched and allowed only one additional run. Fahr gave up eight hits and a walk during those final games, but induced four batters to hit into double plays. He spent the rest of the season with the Ottawa Giants.

In 1952, Fahr spent spring training with the Indians, and while he pitched well, one poor outing against the Chicago White Sox led the Indians to keep him in the minor leagues. He played for the Toronto Maple Leafs from 1952 to 1954; his record in 1952 was 10-13 and his ERA was 3.16. He then spent the rest of the 1954 season with the Charleston Senators and the Minneapolis Millers. He finished his career in 1955 with the Tulsa Oilers and Toronto before retiring.
