= Lamesa Lobos =

- 1939–1957; (1939–1942, 1946–1953, 1957); Lamesa, Texas

Minor league affiliations
- Previous classes: Class B (1957); Class C (1946–1953); Class D (1939–1942)
- Previous leagues: Southwestern League (1957); Longhorn League (1953); West Texas–New Mexico League (1939–1942, 1946–1952)

Major league affiliations
- Previous teams: Washington Senators (1957); Brooklyn Dodgers (1942–1952)

Team data
- Previous names: Lamesa Indians (1957); Winters-Ballinger Eagles (1953); Lamesa Lobos (1946–1953); Lamesa Dodgers (1942); Lamesa Lobos (1939–1941)

The Lamesa Lobos (a.k.a. Lamesa Dodgers and Lamesa Indians) were a minor league baseball team based in Lamesa, Texas. They played in the West Texas–New Mexico League from 1939 to 1942, shut down for World War II, and then resumed from 1946–1952. They moved to the Longhorn League in 1953 and moved on June 3 to become the Winters-Ballinger Eagles (representing both Winters, Texas and Ballinger, Texas). In 1957 the Midland Indians of the Southwestern League moved to town and became the Lamesa Indians for the rest of the season.
