= Carlsbad Potashers =

- 1953–1961; Carlsbad, New Mexico

Minor league affiliations
- Class: Class C (1953–1955); Class B (1956–1957); Class D (1958–1961)
- League: Longhorn League (1953–1955); Southwestern League (1956–1957); Sophomore League (1958–1961)

Major league affiliations
- Team: Chicago Cubs (1958–1961)

Minor league titles
- League titles (1): 1953
- Wild card berths (3): 1954; 1955; 1959

Team data
- Name: Carlsbad Potashers (1953–1961)
- Ballpark: Montgomery Field (1953–1961)

The Carlsbad Potashers were a minor league baseball team based in Carlsbad, New Mexico. Carlsbad teams played as members of the Longhorn League from 1953 to 1955, Southwestern League in 1956 and 1957 and Sophomore League from 1958 to 1961, winning the 1953 league championship. Carlsbad played as a minor league affiliate of the Chicago Cubs from 1958 to 1961 and hosted home games at Montgomery Field.

In 1959, at Montgomery Field in Carlsbad, Potasher player Gil Carter hit a home run claimed have traveled 733 feet, possibly the longest in professional baseball history.

== History ==
The Carlsbad Potashers began minor league play in 1953. Carlsbad teams played as members of the Class C level Longhorn League (1953–1955), the Class B level Southwestern League (1956–1957) and Class D level Sophomore League (1958–1961) during their nine seasons of play.

In their first season, the 1953 Potashers finished with a record of 80–52 and captured the Longhorn League Championship. The 1954 and 1959 teams lost in the league Finals

The Potashers attendance was 83,462 in their first season of 1953, an average of 1,265 per game. In their last season, 1961, they drew 14,974 an average of 236 per game.

=== Gil Carter: Possibly longest home run in history ===
As reported in The Sporting News, Potashers player Gil Carter hit a majestic home run at Montgomery Field in 1959: "On a hot August night in 1959, former heavyweight boxer Gil Carter smashed a pitch through Carlsbad's high-elevated air and out of Montgomery Field. The ball carried over the left field wall, soared past two city streets and landed in a peach tree. A newspaper reporter later took an aerial photo from a plane and used the picture to estimate the ball traveled 733 feet. Carter's hometown paper, The Topeka Capital-Journal, said "the blast is considered the longest home run in baseball history."

The official scorer estimated the home run to have traveled 650 feet. However, aerial photographs measurements put the distance at 700–733 feet, which would make it the longest home run ever hit in professional baseball. The ball itself was signed by Carter and notes the distance of 733 feet.

Gil Carter was inducted into the National Baseball Congress Hall of Fame in 2015.

== The ballpark ==
The Potashers played home minor league games at Montgomery Field. Montgomery Field had a capacity of 2,500 and dimensions of (Left, Center, Right) 340–390–340. The ballpark is no longer in existence.

== Timeline ==
Year(s)	# Yrs.	Team	Level	League	Affiliate	Ballpark
1953–1955	3	Carlsbad Potashers	Class C	Longhorn League	None	Montgomery Field
1956–1957	2	Carlsbad Potashers	Class B	Southwestern League	None	Montgomery Field
1958–1961	4	Carlsbad Potashers	Class D	Sophomore League	Chicago Cubs	Montgomery Field

== Year–by–year records ==
Year	Record	Finish	Manager	Playoffs/Notes
1953	80-52	1st	Pat McLaughlin	League champions
1954	87-52	3rd	Pat McLaughlin	Lost League Finals
1955	72-67	4th	Thurman Tucker	Lost in 1st round
1956	70-74	7th	Thurman Tucker	Did not qualify
1957	65-54	3rd	Jodie Phipps	Did not qualify
1958	55-65	5th	Tony York	Did not qualify
1959	72-54	2nd	Walt Dixon	Lost League Finals
1960	66-64	3rd	Verlon Walker	Did not qualify
1961	56-71	5th	Lou Klein / Walt Dixon	Did not qualify

== Notable alumni ==
- Gil Carter (1957–1959) Inducted National Baseball Congress Hall of Fame (2015)
- Billy Connors (1961)
- Merv Connors (1953)
- Walt Dixon (1959, MGR)
- Jonas Gaines (1956–1957)
- Tom Jordan (1956–1957)
- Lou Klein (1961, MGR)
- Pat McLaughlin (1953–1954, MGR)
- Bob Raudman (1961)
- René Solís (1954)
- Jimmy Stewart (1960)
- Thurman Tucker (1955–1956, MGR) MLB All-Star
- Verlon Walker (1960, MGR)
- Jesse White (1954)
- Tony York (1958, MGR)

== See also ==
- Carlsbad Potashers players
