= Joe Berry (pitcher) =

American baseball pitcher (1904–1958)

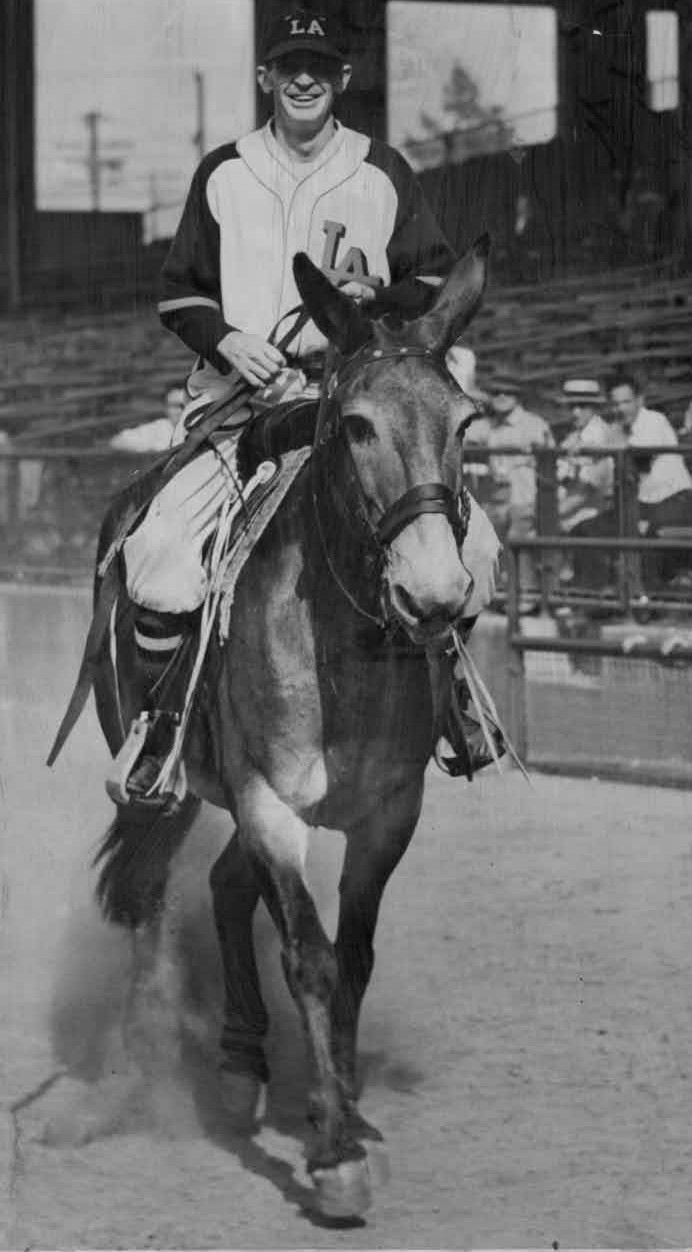
- Pitcher
- Born: December 16, 1904; Huntsville, Arkansas, U.S.
- Died: September 27, 1958 (aged 53); Anaheim, California, U.S.
- Batted: Left Threw: Right

MLB debut
- September 6, 1942, for the Chicago Cubs

Last MLB appearance
- September 21, 1946, for the Cleveland Indians

MLB statistics
- Win–loss record: 21–22
- Earned run average: 2.45
- Strikeouts: 117
- Stats at Baseball Reference

Teams
- Chicago Cubs (1942); Philadelphia Athletics (1944–1946); Cleveland Indians (1946)

Jonas Arthur Berry (December 16, 1904 – September 27, 1958) was a Major League Baseball relief pitcher. The 5 ft 10 1/2 in (1.79 m), 145 lb (66 kg) right-hander played for the Chicago Cubs, Philadelphia Athletics, and Cleveland Indians.

== Career ==
Berry spent 18 seasons in the minor leagues before World War II gave him a chance to pitch regularly in the big leagues. He pitched in two games for the Cubs in 1942, and then made an impact with the Philadelphia A's two years later. The 39-year-old rookie won 10 games in relief and saved 12 more, tying for the league lead in that category. He also led the league with 47 games finished, and his earned run average was 1.94.

In 1945, at age 40, Berry led the league in games pitched (52) and games finished (40), and had another great ERA (2.35). On July 21 of that same year, he pitched eleven scoreless innings of relief in a 24 inning 1–1 tie against the Detroit Tigers.

On July 1, 1946, Berry was purchased from the A's by the Cleveland Indians and continued to be effective, but not as good as he had been the previous two years. He was also 41 then, the fourth oldest player to appear in an American League game that season. In 50 1/3 innings he was 3–7 with a 3.22 ERA.

Career totals include a record of 21–22 in 133 games, 294 innings pitched, 105 games finished, 18 saves, and an ERA of 2.45.

Berry had several types of curveballs, a slider, a fastball, and a screwball used as a changeup.

== Death ==
Berry died in an automobile accident in Anaheim, California.

== See also ==
- List of Major League Baseball annual saves leaders
