= Jackie Sullivan =

American baseball player (1918–1992)

- Second baseman
- Born: February 22, 1918; Princeton, Texas, U.S.
- Died: October 15, 1992 (aged 74); Dallas, Texas, U.S.
- Batted: Right Threw: Right

MLB debut
- July 6, 1944, for the Detroit Tigers

Last MLB appearance
- July 6, 1944, for the Detroit Tigers

MLB statistics
- Games played: 1
- At bats: 1
- Hits: 0
- Stats at Baseball Reference

Teams
- Detroit Tigers (1944)

Carl Mancel Sullivan (February 22, 1918 – October 15, 1992) was an American Major League Baseball second baseman who played in one game for the Detroit Tigers on July 6, 1944. He went hitless in one at bat.
