= Thurman Tucker =

American baseball player (1917–1993)

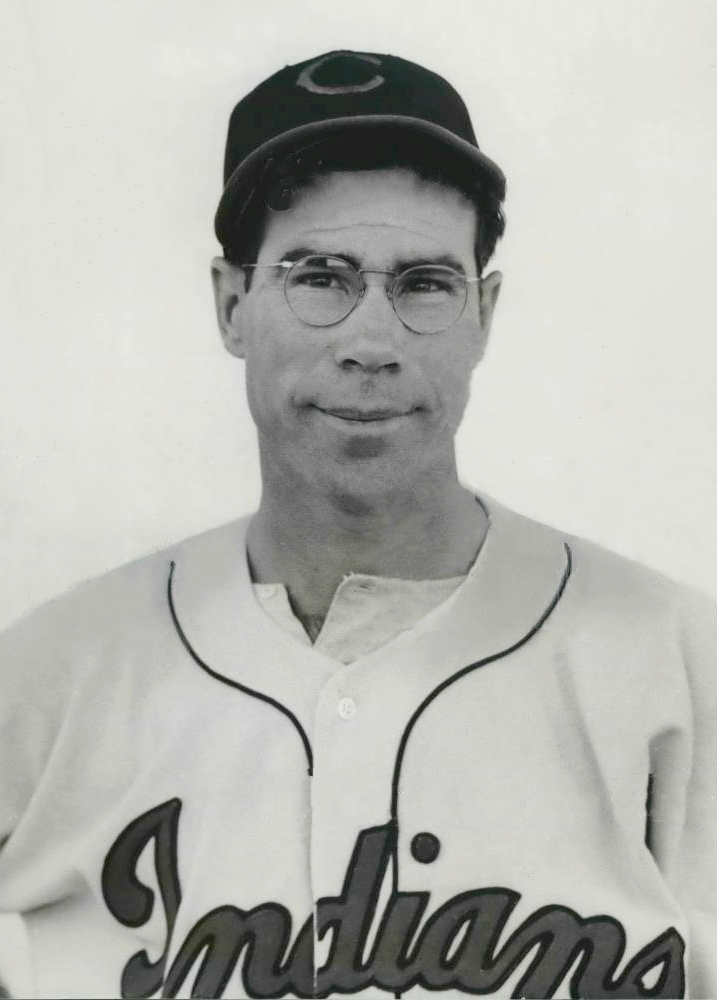
- Tucker in 1950
- Center fielder
- Born: September 26, 1917; Gordon, Texas, U.S.
- Died: May 7, 1993 (aged 75); Oklahoma City, Oklahoma, U.S.
- Batted: Left Threw: Right

MLB debut
- April 14, 1942, for the Chicago White Sox

Last MLB appearance
- April 29, 1951, for the Cleveland Indians

MLB statistics
- Batting average: .255
- Home runs: 9
- Runs batted in: 179
- Stats at Baseball Reference

Teams
- Chicago White Sox (1942–1944, 1946–1947); Cleveland Indians (1948–1951)

Career highlights and awards
- All-Star (1944); World Series champion (1948)

Thurman Lowell Tucker (September 26, 1917 – May 7, 1993) was an American professional baseball player. A center fielder, Tucker played in Major League Baseball for nine seasons in the American League with the Chicago White Sox and Cleveland Indians. In 701 career games, Tucker recorded a batting average of .255 and accumulated 24 triples, nine home runs, and 179 runs batted in (RBI). Due to his resemblance of the film comedian Joe E. Brown, Tucker was nicknamed "Joe E.".

Born and raised in Texas, Tucker first played professionally with the Siloam Springs Travelers. After gradually progressing through minor league baseball, he signed with the Chicago White Sox before the 1941 season. His major league debut came the following year and he spent two years as the White Sox's starting center fielder until he enlisted in the armed forces during World War II. Upon his return, Tucker played two more seasons for the White Sox. Subsequently, he was traded to the Cleveland Indians, for whom he played four years, and continued to play minor league baseball throughout the 1950s. After his retirement, he became a major league scout and insurance agent.

== Early life ==
Thurman Tucker was born on September 26, 1917, and raised in Gordon, Texas. In high school, he was a three-sport athlete, playing baseball (where he was a second baseman), basketball, and track and field. After graduating in 1935, he played semi-professional baseball and enrolled in a baseball school located in Hot Springs, Arkansas. In 1936, at age 18, Tucker signed as a professional with the Fayetteville Bears of the Arkansas–Missouri League, but left the team after only two weeks, without playing a game. Soon after, he was signed by the Siloam Springs Travelers of the same league, where he began his professional career.

== Minor league career ==
In 1936, his first season with the Travelers, Tucker changed fielding positions and became an outfielder. In 117 games, he had a .319 batting average and 25 doubles. The following year, he was to play for the El Dorado Lions of the Cotton States League, but a back injury caused him to miss nearly the entire season. After recovering from the injury, Tucker continued to progress through the minors, spending 1938 with two separate clubs; he played 55 games for the Abbeville A's of the Evangeline Baseball League and 50 games for the Greenville Bucks of the Cotton States League. He remained in the Cotton States League for 1939, playing for the Clarksdale Red Sox, at the time a minor league affiliate of the Boston Red Sox. In 136 games for Clarksdale, Tucker had a .298 batting average and 10 triples. During his first few years in the minor leagues, one manager asked him to take up clowning due to his resemblance to Joe E. Brown and his nickname as a result, Joe E. Tucker objected due to his serious nature and the idea was later dropped.

Tucker's breakthrough minor league year came in 1940, his second with Clarksdale. By the end of June, he was leading the Cotton State League with a batting average of .374. After playing in 97 games, finishing with an average of .390, Tucker was promoted and played in 40 games for the Oklahoma City Indians. At the end of the season, Chicago White Sox farm manager Billy Webb was impressed enough to purchase Tucker's contract from Oklahoma City. At the beginning of the 1941 season, Tucker failed to win the final outfield spot on the White Sox roster from Dave Short, and consequently spent 1941 at Oklahoma City, where he was coached by Rogers Hornsby. In 141 games for the Indians, Tucker had a batting average of .246 and 12 triples.

At spring training for the 1942 season, Tucker competed against Dave Philley for the final outfield spot. White Sox management liked Tucker's defensive abilities, leading to them adding Tucker to their 1942 major league roster; Tucker made his major league debut on April 14, 1942. After playing two games for the White Sox, Tucker was sent down to the Fort Worth Cats of the Texas League, where he spent most of the season and hit .313 in 144 games. When the minor league season ended, Tucker returned to the major league squad, and finished the year having played seven games for the White Sox.

== Chicago White Sox ==
Of the Chicago White Sox outfielders at the beginning of the 1943 season, only Wally Moses was assured of a place on the team. During spring training, manager Jimmy Dykes was impressed by Tucker, who was competing for the starting center fielder position alongside Moose Solters. Consequently, after spring training Tucker became the starting center fielder for 1943, and the team's leadoff hitter. Partway through the season, Tucker's performance caught the eye of American League President Will Harridge, who noted him as someone the public came out to watch in the absence of stars serving in World War II. Among Tucker's achievements during the year were a walk-off home run on July 26 to win a game against the New York Yankees 2–1. Tucker finished the season with a .235 batting average, six triples, and 79 walks in 135 games. He also stole 29 bases, the third best total in the AL, and was caught stealing 17 times, which was second in the league.

Tucker passed a physical examination for the United States Navy before the 1944 season began. Although expected to be called up to serve in the war that year, he was able to play the entire season for the White Sox. Tucker hit very well during the first month of 1944; he had a .403 batting average on May 16, which led the American League. His hitting and fielding abilities impressed critics: sportswriter Fred Lieb noted him as a breakout performer that year, and manager Jimmy Dykes called Tucker the finest defensive outfielder in the American League. Tucker and Dixie Walker led their respective leagues in batting average throughout June; at the end of the month, Tucker had an average of .369 in the American League while Walker had an average of .377 in the National League. Owing to his achievements, Tucker was added to the 1944 All-Star roster for the only time in his career. He was the leadoff hitter in the 1944 Major League Baseball All-Star Game, but went hitless in four at-bats.

Tucker's form faded after the All-Star Game; in early July, he had a hitless streak of 28 at-bats, causing his batting average to shrink from .375 to .327, resulting in losing his status as league leader. When his average fell to .320 after recording one base hit in 35 at-bats, he was removed from the starting lineup for a weekend matchup against the Detroit Tigers in an attempt to halt his decline. Tucker returned to the starting lineup shortly after being removed, and finished the season with a batting average of .287 and six triples. At the end of July that season, both Tucker and George Case participated in a 75-yard dash as part of the White Sox's annual benefit for the war effort; Tucker lost the race to Case by a yard. After the season ended, Tucker formally joined the Navy, and spent the 1945 season serving in the war.

When the players returned to their teams at the end of the war, Tucker was slated to be the starting center fielder for the 1946 season, working alongside Wally Moses and Taffy Wright. Unlike the previous season, he struggled with the bat at first, and was relegated to his original status on the White Sox roster as a good fielder but a poor hitter. At the end of June, Tucker had a batting average of .229, nearly 150 points lower than his average at the same point in 1944. His form recovered in the second half of the season and he finished the year with a batting average of .288 and 20 doubles, both career highs. As the 1947 Chicago White Sox season began, Tucker remained in his center field position after hitting .400 in the last month of the 1946 season, while rookie Dave Philley played in left field and Taffy Wright and Bob Kennedy platooned in right field. However, he started the year by missing some playing time due to a stomach ailment, and did not play regularly for the White Sox until the middle of May. After returning to regular play, Tucker alternated playing time with Philley, and he finished the season with a .236 batting average in 89 games.

== Cleveland Indians ==
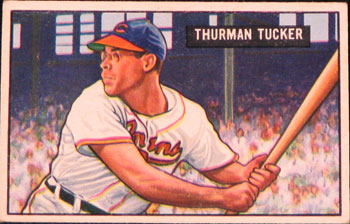
Tucker on a 1951 card

On January 27, 1948, Tucker was traded to the Cleveland Indians for Ralph Weigel; the Indians front office regarded Tucker as "the finest defensive player in baseball." He started off the year as the starting center fielder for the Indians, and in one early matchup against the Detroit Tigers, was the only player not to record a hit in an 8–2 victory. He missed three weeks of playing time in June after breaking a finger when he was hit by a pitch. Upon returning to the lineup, Tucker spent most of the second half of the season as a fourth outfielder, splitting time with Allie Clark and playing in the outfield alongside Larry Doby and Dale Mitchell. He finished the season with a .260 batting average and 52 runs in 83 games, and ended the season with a perfect fielding percentage of 1.000. Tucker participated in game six of the 1948 World Series, scoring a run in the sixth inning on a walk en route to a 4–3 win for the Indians.

The Indians planned to use Tucker as their fourth outfielder for the 1949 season when he served mostly as backup to Doby. He was relegated mostly to pinch hitting duties, and finished the season with a .244 batting average in 20 games and under 200 at-bats. Due to his hitting struggles, Indians manager Lou Boudreau tried converting Tucker to a switch hitter to start off the 1950 season. Tucker was again set to be a backup outfielder in 1950. His performances during the year included hitting a home run, the only one he hit that season, in an 8–5 victory over the Brooklyn Dodgers; the teams raised $60,000 in that game to benefit sandlot teams in Cleveland. Tucker finished the season with a .178 batting average in 54 games, the lowest mark of his career.

Tucker and Allie Clark both attempted to make the Indians roster to begin the 1951 season, as the additions of Harry Simpson and Minnie Miñoso made it likely that one or both of them would be traded or released. Tucker played only one game for the Indians, on April 29 when he recorded a strikeout in his lone at-bat. In early May, the Indians sent him to their Triple-A minor league affiliate, the San Diego Padres of the Pacific Coast League; his last major league game was April 29.

== Later life ==
After being sent to the Padres, Tucker completed the 1951 season with them. In 88 games, Tucker had two triples and a .222 batting average. In the offseason, Tucker operated his own taxicab in Texas, and he contemplated retirement from baseball during a contract dispute in February 1952. He eventually played 47 games for the now-unaffiliated Padres, hitting .225 in the process. In mid-June, the Padres sold his contract to the Oklahoma City Indians. Tucker played in 72 games for the Indians that season, hitting .263. He retired from baseball before the 1953 season, and did not play with any professional team during that time.

Tucker returned to baseball in 1954 to play for the Lubbock Hubbers of the West Texas–New Mexico League. He played part-time for the team, serving as a replacement when players needed time off, whether through injury or to spend time with their families. He hit .360 in 25 games for the Hubbers. The following year, he served as player-manager for the Carlsbad Potashers of the Longhorn League. Tucker hit .275 in 114 games for the Potashers, including 25 doubles and eight home runs. He continued as player-manager for the Potashers in 1956, but the management considered firing him during a 14-game losing streak. He finished the year with a .306 batting average in 128 games. The following season, he was the player-manager of the Hobbs Sports, but only played in 16 games for them, hitting .273. In 1958, he ended his playing career, and became the general manager of the Hobbs team.

After retiring, Tucker became an insurance agent and lived in Oklahoma City. He married and had four children; his son Ronald served in the Vietnam War. In 1962, he also became one of the Houston Astros' first scouts. Tucker died on May 7, 1993, in Oklahoma City and is buried at Gordon Cemetery in his hometown of Gordon, Texas.
