= Joe Bauman =

- First baseman
- Born: April 16, 1922; Welch, Oklahoma, U.S.
- Died: September 20, 2005 (aged 83); Roswell, New Mexico, U.S.
- Batted: Left Threw: Left

Southern Association debut
- 1941, for the Newport Dodgers

Last Northeast Arkansas League appearance
- 1956, for the Roswell Rockets

Career statistics
- Batting average: .337
- Home runs: 337
- Runs batted in: 1,057

Teams
- Newport Dodgers (1941); Little Rock Travelers (1941); Amarillo Gold Sox (1946–47); Hartford Chiefs (1948); Milwaukee Brewers (1948); Artesia Drillers (1952–53); Roswell Rockets (1954–56)

Career highlights and awards
- Single-season minor league home run record (72); Led the West Texas–New Mexico League in home runs (1946); Led the Longhorn League in home runs (1952–55); Led the Longhorn League in batting average (1954)

Joe Willis Bauman (April 16, 1922 – September 20, 2005) was an American first baseman in professional baseball who played primarily in the low minor leagues. He is best remembered for his time with the Roswell Rockets of the Class C Longhorn League, for whom he hit 72 home runs in 1954, setting a professional baseball record that stood until 2001. Born in Welch, Oklahoma, he threw and batted left-handed, stood 6 feet 4 inches (1.93 m) tall and weighed 235 pounds (107 kg).

== Early life ==
Bauman was born in Welch, Oklahoma, in 1922 to his father Joe Sr. and his mother Tennessee. He grew up in Oklahoma City and graduated from Capitol Hill High School in 1941.

== Professional baseball career ==
Bauman debuted in professional baseball with the Newport Dodgers in the Northeast Arkansas League in 1941. Hitting only three home runs in 59 games, he also went 0–10 as a pitcher when he was called up to the Little Rock Travelers in the Southern Association. During the winter of 1942, he played semi-professional ball. He served in the United States Navy from 1943 to 1945, and was stationed at Naval Air Station Norman, where he taught physical fitness and played baseball. During that time, he married his high school sweetheart Dorothy and lived in Oklahoma.

Upon his return in 1946, Bauman settled in with the Amarillo Gold Sox in the West Texas–New Mexico League. He led the circuit with 48 home runs, 159 runs batted in, and a .301 batting average. The following season, his home run totals went down, though his production went up. He hit just 38 homers, but batted .350 and drew 151 walks, and was signed by the Boston Braves.

In 1948, Bauman played in the Braves organization, going 0 for 1 in Class AAA with the Milwaukee Brewers, and posting fair stats with the Class AA Hartford Chiefs (.275, 55 BB, 10 HR in 276 AB), while splitting time with Ray Sanders . It was Bauman's only time outside the low minors, and left it inconclusive as to whether he could play in the majors or not.

The Braves tried to send him to the Atlanta Crackers of the Southern Association but wanted to cut his salary. After four years in the U.S. Navy, Bauman was tired of taking orders and walked away. "I told them that I could make more money selling 24-inch shoestrings on any corner in Oklahoma City", he said. During this era in baseball, most major leaguers did not make much money.

Bauman returned to Oklahoma in 1949, signing on for three seasons with the semi-pro Elk City Elks. He also opened a service station on busy U.S. Highway 66 with business partner Jack Riley. The Elks did well, especially in 1949 and 1950, and Bauman was a crowd favorite, known simply as "Joe." Fans from western Oklahoma and the Texas Panhandle flocked to watch him knock home runs over the unique red rock wall of Ackley Park. By 1951, the oil-boom economy and the team had begun to lag, though, and Bauman decided to move on.

At 30, Bauman joined up with the Class C Longhorn League for 1952, signing with the Artesia Drillers. During that year, his triple crown stats were .375-50-157, good enough to lead the league in homers, RBI, and walks (148). The next year, he led the league in walks (130), runs scored (135), and home runs (53), while maintaining a high average. After the season, he moved to Roswell.

The Roswell Rockets' ballpark had a right field wall that was 329 feet from home. It was a prime target for Bauman, who was a left-handed pull hitter with an uppercut swing. In 1954, Bauman won the triple crown and also led the league in runs and walks for Roswell. In 138 games, he had 199 hits in 498 at bats for a .400 average. He also drove in 228 runs and walked 150 times. He hit 35 doubles, 3 triples, and 72 home runs – the latter, a professional baseball record that stood until Barry Bonds topped it in 2001. The previous record had been 69, and Bauman hit 13 home runs in the last 14 games to break the mark. He also became the first professional player to hit 50 homers in three straight seasons. "That summer the ball looked this big," he later said, circling an area the size of a ripe cantaloupe with his hands.

Roswell was a small town, and Bauman was the biggest local attraction since the 1947 crash and suspected alien landing. After each home run fans pushed dollar bills through the fence at which the game would be stopped for a few minutes to collect all the money.

Bauman could not duplicate his 1954 season in 1955, hitting 46 home runs with a batting average of .336. The following season, he played just 52 games and hit 17 homers. He retired in 1956 at age 34.

For his professional baseball career, Bauman's statistics were: 1,019 games, 982 runs scored, 1,166 hits, 337 home runs, 1,057 runs batted in, 974 walks, and a .337 batting average. Between his contracts, his business, and the cash fans gave him for home runs, Bauman made more money than some major league players. However, he always wondered if he could have made the majors himself if he had not spent three years of his career playing semi-pro ball.

== Later life and legacy ==
After his baseball career, Bauman continued to run the service station which he had started operating during the last years of his playing career. He lived in Roswell and died there on September 20, 2005. He was survived by his wife Dorothy.

The Joe Bauman Home Run Award is given out annually since 2002 to the minor league baseball player with the most home runs. Science fiction writer Harry Turtledove made Bauman the central character of his humorous short story "The Star and the Rockets".

The longtime ballpark in Roswell, in which Bauman played, is now named Joe Bauman Baseball Stadium. The address is 900 Block East Poe Roswell, New Mexico, 88201.
