= Pat McLaughlin (baseball) =

American baseball player (1910–1999)

- Pitcher
- Born: August 17, 1910; Taylor, Texas, U.S.
- Died: November 1, 1999 (aged 89); Houston, Texas, U.S.
- Batted: Right Threw: Right

MLB debut
- April 25, 1937, for the Detroit Tigers

Last MLB appearance
- August 5, 1945, for the Detroit Tigers

MLB statistics
- Win–loss record: 0–2
- Earned run average: 6.88
- Strikeouts: 8
- Stats at Baseball Reference

Teams
- Detroit Tigers (1937); Philadelphia Athletics (1940); Detroit Tigers (1945)

Patrick Elmer McLaughlin (August 17, 1910 – November 1, 1999) was an American pitcher in Major League Baseball. He played for the Detroit Tigers and Philadelphia Athletics.
