= Tom Jordan (baseball) =

American baseball player (1919–2019)

- Catcher
- Born: September 5, 1919; Lawton, Oklahoma, U.S.
- Died: August 26, 2019 (aged 99); Roswell, New Mexico, U.S.
- Batted: Right Threw: Right

MLB debut
- September 4, 1944, for the Chicago White Sox

Last MLB appearance
- April 28, 1948, for the St. Louis Browns

MLB statistics
- Batting average: .240
- Home runs: 1
- Runs batted in: 6
- Stats at Baseball Reference

Teams
- Chicago White Sox (1944; 1946); Cleveland Indians (1946); St. Louis Browns (1948)

Thomas Jefferson Jordan (September 5, 1919 – August 26, 2019) was an American professional baseball player, a catcher who appeared in 39 major league games over three seasons with the Chicago White Sox (1944; 1946), Cleveland Indians (1946), and the St. Louis Browns (1948). Born in Lawton, Oklahoma, Jordan stood 6 feet 1 inch (1.85 m) tall and weighed 195 pounds (88 kg). He threw and batted right-handed.

== Biography ==
Jordan's professional career took place over a twenty-year period, beginning in the minor leagues in 1938 and ending in 1957 after he was a playing manager for a number of unaffiliated teams in the low minors in the Southwestern United States. He spent the entire 1946 campaign in the major leagues, starting with the White Sox before being traded to Cleveland for fellow catcher Frankie Hayes on July 5. As a member of the Indians, on August 25, he hit his only major league home run, a solo shot at Fenway Park off 20-game-winner Boo Ferriss in a 2–1 Boston Red Sox win.

During his big-league career, Jordan collected 23 hits in 96 at bats, including four doubles and two triples. A son, Tom Jr., was winning pitcher of the championship game of the 1956 Little League World Series. After retiring from baseball, Jordan owned a farm in Roswell, New Mexico. Following the death of Fred Caligiuri, Jordan was recognized as the oldest living major league ballplayer at the time of his death, which occurred just 10 days before his 100th birthday. He was also the last known surviving player that was born in the 1910's.

Records
| Preceded by Fred Caligiuri | Oldest recognized verified living baseball player November 30, 2018 – August 26, 2019 | Succeeded by Val Heim |
