= Hobbs Pirates =

- (1937-1938, 1955–1961); Hobbs, New Mexico

Minor league affiliations
- Previous classes: Class-D (1958–1961, 1937-38); Class-B (1956–1957); Class-C (1955)
- Previous leagues: Sophomore League (1958–1961); Southwestern League (1956–1957); Longhorn League (1955); West Texas-New Mexico League (1937–1938)

Major league affiliations
- Previous teams: Pittsburgh Pirates (1960–1961); St. Louis Cardinals (1958–1959); Washington Senators (1956); Detroit Tigers (1938)

Minor league titles
- League titles: 3 (1957, 1960, 1961)

Team data
- Previous names: Hobbs Pirates (1960–1961); Hobbs Cardinals (1958–1959); Hobbs Sports (1955–1957); Hobbs Boosters (1938); Hobbs Drillers (1937)
- Previous parks: Bender Park

The Hobbs Pirates was the final name of a minor league baseball club based in Hobbs, New Mexico from 1955 through 1961. Hobbs teams played as members of the West Texas-New Mexico League (1937–1938), Longhorn League (1955), Southwestern League (1956–1957) and Sophomore League (1958–1961), winning three league championships. Hobbs minor league teams hosted home games at Bender Park.

Hobbs teams were minor league affiliates of the Detroit Tigers in 1938, Washington Senators in 1956, St. Louis Cardinals from 1958 to 1959 and Pittsburgh Pirates from 1960 to 1961.

== History ==
The first team in Hobbs was the 1937 Hobbs Dillers of the West Texas-New Mexico League, who also played in 1938. The franchise revived in 1955 with the Hobbs Sports, an affiliate of the Washington Senators and was a member of the Longhorn League and the Southwestern League. In 1958 the club joined the Sophomore League, became an affiliate with the St. Louis Cardinals and became known as the Hobbs Cardinals. In 1960, the club was finally named the Pirates, after the Pittsburgh Pirates began an affiliation with the team. Under the Pirates, Hobbs won league titles in 1960 and 1961. The Sophomore League folded after the 1961 season.

== The ballpark ==
Hobbs teams played at Bender Park. The site is a now a park located at 1100 West Marland Boulevard Hobbs, NM 88240.

== Season–by–season ==
| Year | Record | Finish | Manager | Playoffs |
|---|---|---|---|---|
| 1955 | 62–77 | 6th | Pat Stasey | Did not qualify |
| 1956 | 90–52 | 1st | Pat Stasey | Lost in 1st round |
| 1957 | 73–52 | 1st | Thurman Tucker | League champions |
| 1958 | 59–61 | 4th | Wayne Wallace | Did not qualify |
| 1959 | 70–54 | 3rd | Thurman Tucker | Lost in 1st round |
| 1960 | 70-58 | 2nd | Al Kubski | League champions |
| 1961 | 77–48 | 1st | Al Kubski | League Champs |

== Notable alumni ==
- Gene Michael (1961)
- Thurman Tucker (1957, 1959) MLB All-Star
- Ron Woods (1961)
- Gary Waslewski (1960–1961)

=== See also ===
Hobbs Boosters Players
Hobbs Cardinals Players
Hobbs Drillers Players
Hobbs Sports Players
Hobbs Pirates Players
