= Tony York =

American baseball player (1912–1970)

- Infielder
- Born: November 27, 1912; Irene, Texas, U.S.
- Died: April 18, 1970 (aged 57); Hillsboro, Texas, U.S.
- Batted: Right Threw: Right

MLB debut
- April 18, 1944, for the Chicago Cubs

Last MLB appearance
- June 25, 1944, for the Chicago Cubs

MLB statistics
- Batting average: .235
- Home runs: 0
- Runs batted in: 7
- Stats at Baseball Reference

Teams
- Chicago Cubs (1944)

Tony Batton York (November 27, 1912 – April 18, 1970) was an American professional baseball player. He played part of one season in Major League Baseball for the Chicago Cubs in 1944 as a shortstop and third baseman. The 31-year-old rookie was measured during his playing career at 5 ft 10 in (1.78 m) and weighing 165 lbs.

== Personal life ==
He was born in Irene, Texas to Theodore York (1888–1942) and his wife Mattie. Tony was the second of their four children, and the only son. His sisters were Juanita M., Lois C., and May W. York. He was married twice, first to Stephanie. They had no children. His second marriage, on January 29, 1941, was to Mariana Norris (November 30, 1915 – July 21, 2009). They had one daughter, Nancy Ann York.

Stephanie born in 1985 was the wife of Tony Batton York's Great Grandson Tony Farmer.

== Playing career ==
York had an extensive career in minor league baseball. He began his career in 1933 with the Baton Rouge Solons in the Dixie League, and continued to play until 1956. In the minors, York was primarily a shortstop, moving to second base full-time in 1947.

York is one of many ballplayers who only appeared in the major leagues during World War II. He made his major league debut on April 18, 1944 (Opening Day) in a road game against the Cincinnati Reds at Crosley Field.

His season and career major league totals for 28 games include a .235 batting average (20-for-85) with 7 runs batted in and 4 runs scored. He was a good fielder for his era, handling 120 out of 125 total chances successfully for a fielding percentage of .960.

In 1952, York became player-manager of the Texarkana Bears in the Big State League. He served as a player-manager for the remainder of his playing career, and continued managing in the minor leagues until 1958.

== Death ==
Tony and his wife are buried in Fairview Cemetery in Hubbard, Texas.
