= Ballinger Cats =

Longhorn League baseball team based in Ballinger, Texas

The Ballinger Cats were a Longhorn League baseball team based in Ballinger, Texas, United States that played from 1947 to 1950. They were affiliated with the Cincinnati Reds in 1948. As well, they played their home games at Ballinger Rec. Park that season. In their first year of existence, 1947, they won the league championship under manager Stuart Williams.

Multiple major league players spent time either playing and/or managing for the team, including Bill Atwood, Lindsay Brown, Charlie English, Buddy Hancken, Roy McMillan and 46-year-old George Milstead.

Ballinger was home of minor league baseball teams from the 1920s to its disbandment in the late 1950s. The Ballinger Browns were affiliated with the bygone St. Louis Browns in the 1930s and early 1940s. Today, the Ballinger Cats name is back but they are members of the Central Texas Collegiate League, a woodbat summer league of collegiate level players.
