= Big Spring Bombers =

Big Spring
- 1928–1955; (1928–1929, 1938–1942, 1947–1955); Big Spring, Texas

Minor league affiliations
- Previous classes: Class C (1951–1955); Class D (1928–1929, 1938–1942, 1947–1950)
- League: Longhorn League (1947–1955)
- Previous leagues: West Texas–New Mexico League (1938–1942); West Texas League (1928–1929)

Major league affiliations
- Previous teams: Washington Senators (1948); Brooklyn Dodgers (1941); New York Yankees (1939)

Minor league titles
- League titles: 1 (1949)

Team data
- Previous names: Big Spring Cosden Cops (1955); Big Spring Broncs (1947–1954); Big Spring Pirates (1942); Big Spring Bombers (1941); Big Spring Barons (1938–1940); Big Spring Cowboys (1929); Big Spring Springers (1928)
- Previous parks: Roberts Field

Big Spring, Texas was home to several minor league baseball teams between 1928 and 1955. The Hamlin Pied Pipers moved from Hamlin, Texas to Big Spring during the 1928 season and became the Big Spring Springers, who finished 6th in the West Texas League that season, 21 games out of first place under manager Armistead "Army" Magness.

The team changed its name to the Big Spring Cowboys the following year and were at one point during the season managed by Nick Carter. They dissolved following the season.

In 1938, the Big Spring Barons joined the West Texas–New Mexico League, before they moved to Odessa, Texas during the 1940 season and became the Odessa Oilers. They were replaced the following season by the Big Spring Bombers, an affiliate of the Brooklyn Dodgers, but that team only lasted one season.

The Wichita Falls Spudders moved to town in 1942 and took on the name of the Big Spring Pirates but only lasted for part of the month of June and only played road games till the league shut them down on June 20.

In 1947, the Big Spring Broncs started playing in the Longhorn League. They were the most successful team from Big Spring as they won the championship in 1949. They became the Big Spring Cosden Cops in 1955, taking their name from the long-time advertising mascot of the Cosden Petroleum Company based in Big Spring. Josh Cosden, Jr., who inherited the company after the death of founder Josh Cosden in 1940, later gained national attention for a brief marriage to Zsa Zsa Gabor.
