= Odessa Dodgers =

- 1937–1960; (1937, 1940, 1947–1955, 1959–1960); Odessa, Texas

Minor league affiliations
- Previous classes: Class D (1959–1960); Class C (1951–1955); Class D (1937, 1940, 1947–1950)
- League: Sophomore League (1959–1960)
- Previous leagues: Longhorn League (1947–1955); West Texas–New Mexico League (1937, 1940)

Major league affiliations
- Previous teams: Los Angeles Dodgers (1959–1960)

Minor league titles
- League titles: 2 (1950, 1951)

Team data
- Previous names: Odessa Dodgers (1959–1960); Odessa Eagles (1955); Odessa Oilers (1937, 1940, 1947–1954)
- Previous parks: Oiler Park

The Odessa Dodgers were a minor league baseball team affiliated with the Los Angeles Dodgers. They played in the Sophomore League from 1959 to 1960 and represented Odessa, Texas. The Dodgers manager was Roy Hartsfield.

Originally, the city of Odessa was home to the Odessa Oilers who played in the West Texas–New Mexico League in 1937. In 1940, the Big Spring Barons moved to town on June 20 and took on the Oilers name for the rest of the season.

The Oilers resumed action in the Longhorn League in 1947 and remained through 1954 when they renamed themselves the Odessa Eagles for 1955.
