= Artesia Dodgers =

- 1961; (1951-1955, 1958-1961); Artesia, New Mexico

Minor league affiliations
- Previous classes: Class-D (1958-1961); Class-C (1951-1955)
- League: Sophomore League (1958-1961)
- Previous leagues: Longhorn League (1951-1955)

Major league affiliations
- Previous teams: Los Angeles Dodgers (1961); San Francisco Giants (1958-1960)

Minor league titles
- League titles: 1 (1954)

Team data
- Previous names: Artesia Dodgers (1961); Artesia Giants (1958-1960); Artesia Numexers (1954-1955); Artesia Drillers (1951-1953)
- Previous parks: Brainard Park (1951-1955, 1958-1961)

The Artesia Dodgers was the final nickname of the minor league baseball team based in Artesia, New Mexico. Artesia teams played from 1951-1955 and 1958-1961 as an affiliate of the San Francisco Giants and Los Angeles Dodgers.

== History ==
The Artesia Drillers (1951-1953) and later the Artesia Numexers(1954-1955) first began play in Artesia as members of the Longhorn League from 1951-1955.

They were later an affiliate of the Los Angeles Dodgers during final season of existence in 1961. They finished 48-78 in the Sophomore League under manager Spider Jorgensen. Before becoming the Dodgers, they were a San Francisco Giants affiliate known as the Artesia Giants from 1958-1960.

The 1954 Numexers were Longhorn League Champions after finishing 92-46 in the regular season. The team moniker was a combination of "New" and "Mexico."

The 1958 team finished 63-57, losing in the league Finals.

== The ballpark ==
Artesia teams hosted home minor league games at Brainard Park. Today, the ballpark is still in use, known as Brainard Baseball Field, and serves as the home to Artesia High School teams. The ballpark is located at 1102 North 13th Street in Artesia, New Mexico.

== Notable alumni ==
- Jesus Alou (1960)
- Dick Dietz (1960) MLB All-Star
- Clarence Jones (1961)
